= List of Asian Games medalists in rowing =

Asian Games medalists

This is the complete list of Asian Games medalists in rowing from 1982 to 2026.

== Men ==
=== Single sculls ===
Games	Gold	Silver	Bronze
1982 New Delhi	Liu Qun (CHN)	Shunsuke Horiuchi (JPN)	(PRK)
1986 Seoul	Liu Qun (CHN)	Shunsuke Horiuchi (JPN)	Go Dong-hi (KOR)
1990 Beijing	Li Zhongping (CHN)	Lim Kyung-suk (KOR)	Han Min-chol (PRK)
1994 Hiroshima	Huang Xiaoping (CHN)	Sergeý Bormotin (TKM)	Georgiy Bartenev (KAZ)
1998 Bangkok	Cai Yukun (CHN)	Lasmin (INA)	Muhammad Akram (PAK)
2002 Busan	Cui Yonghui (CHN)	Law Hiu Fung (HKG)	Muhammad Akram (PAK)
2006 Doha	Shin Eun-chul (KOR)	Bajrang Lal Takhar (IND)	Mikhail Garnik (KAZ)
2010 Guangzhou	Bajrang Lal Takhar (IND)	Wang Ming-hui (TPE)	Haider Nawzad (IRQ)
2014 Incheon	Mohsen Shadi (IRI)	Kim Dong-yong (KOR)	Sawarn Singh (IND)
2018 Jakarta–Palembang	Zhang Liang (CHN)	Kim Dong-yong (KOR)	Ryuta Arakawa (JPN)
2022 Hangzhou	Zhang Liang (CHN)	Ryuta Arakawa (JPN)	Chiu Hin Chun (HKG)
2026 Aichi–Nagoya	Deng Zhiwei (CHN)	Shakhboz Kholmurzaev (UZB)	Tatsuya Sakurama (JPN)

=== Double sculls ===
Games	Gold	Silver	Bronze
1990 Beijing	China (CHN); Chen Aiguo; Huang Xiaoping	Japan (JPN); Tadashi Abe; Masahiro Sakata	North Korea (PRK); Chong Gwang-sok; Pak Mun-chol
1994 Hiroshima	China (CHN); Liang Hongming; Liu Xianbin	Turkmenistan (TKM); Dmitriý Morozow; Sergeý Bormotin	Japan (JPN); Hitoshi Hase; Takehiko Kubo
1998 Bangkok	China (CHN); Cui Yonghui; Li Yang	Japan (JPN); Kazuaki Mimoto; Daisaku Takeda	North Korea (PRK); Kim Sun-yong; Ri Kye-jun
2002 Busan	China (CHN); Wang Jingfeng; Su Hui	Kazakhstan (KAZ); Yevgeniy Latypov; Mikhail Garnik	South Korea (KOR); Kim Jung-kwan; Kim Dal-ho
2006 Doha	Uzbekistan (UZB); Vladimir Chernenko; Ruslan Naurzaliev	South Korea (KOR); Kim Dal-ho; Ham Jung-wook	China (CHN); Su Hui; Cui Yonghui
2010 Guangzhou	China (CHN); Su Hui; Zhang Liang	Uzbekistan (UZB); Vyacheslav Didrih; Ruslan Naurzaliev	South Korea (KOR); Kim Dong-yong; Kim Hwi-gwan
2014 Incheon	China (CHN); Zhang Liang; Dai Jun	Chinese Taipei (TPE); Wang Ming-hui; Yu Tsung-wei	Iran (IRI); Mojtaba Shojaei; Amir Rahnama
2018 Jakarta–Palembang	Uzbekistan (UZB); Shakhboz Kholmurzaev; Shakhboz Abdujabborov	China (CHN); Zhang Zhiyuan; Chen Sensen	Thailand (THA); Prem Nampratueng; Jaruwat Saensuk
2022 Hangzhou	China (CHN); Liu Zhiyu; Zhang Liang	Uzbekistan (UZB); Shakhboz Kholmurzaev; Mekhrojbek Mamatkulov	Indonesia (INA); Ihram; La Memo
2026 Aichi–Nagoya	China (CHN); Yi Xudi; Nie Yide	Uzbekistan (UZB); Mekhrojbek Mamatkulov; Pavel Sorin	India (IND); Satnam Singh; Salman Khan

=== Quadruple sculls ===
Games	Gold	Silver	Bronze
2014 Incheon	China (CHN); Ma Jian; Liu Zhiyu; Liu Dang; Zhang Quan	South Korea (KOR); Kim In-won; Kim Hwi-gwan; Lee Seon-soo; Choi Do-sub	Kazakhstan (KAZ); Vitaliy Vassilyev; Mikhail Taskin; Yevgeniy Vassilyev; Vladislav Yakovlev
2018 Jakarta–Palembang	India (IND); Sawarn Singh; Dattu Baban Bhokanal; Om Prakash; Sukhmeet Singh	Indonesia (INA); Kakan Kusmana; Edwin Ginanjar Rudiana; Sulpianto; La Memo	Thailand (THA); Piyapong Arnunamang; Methasit Phromphoem; Prem Nampratueng; Jaruwat Saensuk
2022 Hangzhou	China (CHN); Han Wei; Yi Xudi; Zang Ha; Adilijiang Sulitan	Uzbekistan (UZB); Shakhzod Nurmatov; Shakhboz Kholmurzaev; Mekhrojbek Mamatkulov; Sobirjon Safaroliev	India (IND); Satnam Singh; Parminder Singh; Jakar Khan; Sukhmeet Singh
2026 Aichi–Nagoya	China (CHN); Mu Xiaolong; Zhang Xiuli; Xue Hao; Ou Zhiwei	Indonesia (INA); Ihram; Rendi Setia Maulana; Febrian; La Memo	Uzbekistan (UZB); Shakhboz Kholmurzaev; Davrjon Davronov; Mekhrojbek Mamatkulov; Pavel Sorin

=== Coxless pair ===
Games	Gold	Silver	Bronze
1982 New Delhi	China (CHN); Ye Binglai; Wang Deping	Japan (JPN)	South Korea (KOR); Chung Jae-soo; Han Young-myong
1986 Seoul	Japan (JPN); Satoru Miyoshi; Tadashi Abe	China (CHN); Gu Jiahong; Tang Hongwei	South Korea (KOR); Lee Sang-gyu; Yoo Seong-joon
1990 Beijing	China (CHN); Feng Feng; Xu Wuling	South Korea (KOR); Jo Jun-hyung; Lee Ki-hyun	India (IND); Surinder Singh; Rajender Singh Bhanwala
1994 Hiroshima	China (CHN); Feng Feng; Xu Wuling	Turkmenistan (TKM); Dmitriý Krupin; Waleriý Gussar	India (IND); Jagjit Singh; Rajender Prahlad Shilke
2018 Jakarta–Palembang	China (CHN); Li Xiaoxiong; Zhao Jingbin	Uzbekistan (UZB); Sardor Tulkinkhujaev; Alisher Turdiev	Japan (JPN); Yoshihiro Otsuka; Yuta Takano
2022 Hangzhou	Hong Kong (HKG); Lam San Tung; Wong Wai Chun	Uzbekistan (UZB); Shekhroz Hakimov; Dilshodjon Khudoyberdiev	India (IND); Babu Lal Yadav; Lekh Ram
2026 Aichi–Nagoya	Kazakhstan (KAZ); Vladislav Yakovlev; Ivan Chernukhin	China (CHN); Cao Chuang; Yang Mengshuai	Uzbekistan (UZB); Maksim Golubev; Alisher Turdiev

=== Coxed pair ===
Games	Gold	Silver	Bronze
1982 New Delhi	China (CHN); Xu Guoliang; Yan Jun; Li Jianxin	Japan (JPN)	India (IND); Pravin Uberoi; Mohammed Amin Naik; Deependra Tomar
1986 Seoul	China (CHN); Chen Lianjia; Wang Hongbing; Yan Jun	Japan (JPN); Hidekazu Hayashi; Hiroyoshi Matsui; Tokuhisa Watai	South Korea (KOR); Chung In-kyo; Sin Seung-ho; Hyun Song-in

=== Coxless four ===
Games	Gold	Silver	Bronze
1990 Beijing	China (CHN); Xu Quan; Wang Xinyue; Yao Jianzhong; Wang Yaodong	South Korea (KOR); Hwang Hee-taek; Lee Hyung-ki; Ha Jin-sik; Yoon Nam-ho	India (IND); Gajendran; Jasbir Singh; Surinder Singh; P. M. Pathak
1994 Hiroshima	China (CHN); Liang Hongming; Li Peilong; Ji Renxu; Liu Xianbin	Japan (JPN); Yasunori Tanabe; Hiroyoshi Matsui; Kenji Hashimoto; Takatoshi Iwatsuki	Turkmenistan (TKM); Dmitriý Krupin; Mihail Baboviç; Roman Napalkow; Waleriý Gussar
1998 Bangkok	China (CHN); Zhang Binggui; Nie Junliang; Sun Jun; Dai Haizhen	Japan (JPN); Shinpei Murai; Yukuo Okamoto; Tatsuya Mizutani; Tatsunori Nishioka	India (IND); Birbal Singh; Tarlochan Singh; Johnson Xavier; Jagjit Singh
2002 Busan	China (CHN); Sun Jian; Chen Zheng; Wang Bo; Chi Huanqi	Uzbekistan (UZB); Nasrullo Nazarov; Bahadir Davletyarov; Vladimir Tremasov; Ruslan Bichurin	India (IND); Jenil Krishnan; Inderpal Singh; Roshan Lal; Paulose Pandari Kunnel
2006 Doha	Japan (JPN); Yu Kataoka; Yuya Higashiyama; Rokuroh Okumura; Yoshinori Sato	India (IND); Dharmesh Sangwan; Jenil Krishnan; Sukhjeet Singh; Satish Joshi	Indonesia (INA); Thomas Hallatu; Sumardi; Jamaluddin; Iswandi
2010 Guangzhou	China (CHN); Liu Kun; Li Dongjian; Wu Lin; Sun Zhaowen	India (IND); Saji Thomas; Jenil Krishnan; Anil Kumar; Ranjit Singh	Uzbekistan (UZB); Efim Kuznetsov; Botir Murodov; Yokub Khamzaev; Sergey Tyan
2022 Hangzhou	Uzbekistan (UZB); Shekhroz Hakimov; Dilshodjon Khudoyberdiev; Davrjon Davronov; Alisher Turdiev	China (CHN); Li Wenlei; Chen Xianfeng; Xu Qiao; Cai Pengpeng	India (IND); Jaswinder Singh; Bheem Singh; Punit Kumar; Ashish
2026 Aichi–Nagoya	China (CHN); Li Chun; Li Zepeng; Shao Zhiqiang; Bian Shihao	Uzbekistan (UZB); Fazliddin Karimov; Dilshodjon Khudoyberdiev; Maksim Golubev; Alisher Turdiev	Vietnam (VIE); Trần Dương Nghĩa; Thái Bảo Toàn; Hoàng Văn Đạt; Nguyễn Phú

=== Coxed four ===
Games	Gold	Silver	Bronze
1982 New Delhi	China (CHN); Liu Weiping; Li Yibin; Wang Hongbing; Zhang Jinyu; Pan Hansheng	North Korea (PRK)	South Korea (KOR); Park Jae-hyun; Ahn Hee-ku; Lee Byung-geun; Lee Jae-won; Jin Han-geun
1986 Seoul	China (CHN); Li Jianxin; Gao Yuhua; Wang Hongbing; Yan Jun; Chen Zhiqiang	South Korea (KOR); Lee Bong-su; Lee Hae-dal; Lee Sung-kyun; Kim Woong-hak; Sun Woo-sang	Japan (JPN); Akihisa Hirata; Hiromitsu Fukagawa; Kunihiko Obayashi; Masahiko Nomura; Tomoyuki Okano

=== Eight ===
Games	Gold	Silver	Bronze
1986 Seoul	China (CHN); Li Jianxin; Gao Yuhua; Chen Zhiqiang; Zheng Kangsheng; Yu Hanqiao; Xu Quan; Wang Xinyue; He Dongjiang; Zhu Ledan	Japan (JPN); Eiichi Tsukinoki; Hideaki Maeguchi; Iwayuki Hirota; Katsuyuki Kato; Motohisa Kyuno; Setsuo Morizane; Toshihiko Yagi; Toshihiro Murakami; Yukiyori Ishita	South Korea (KOR); Chung Boo-young; Kim Gyu-hwan; Lee Hong-keun; Lim Jong-soon; Lee Jung-kwea; Park Seung-deuk; Park Sung-lae; Park Sung-kuk; Jeong Yeon-kil
1990 Beijing	China (CHN); Li Jianxin; Chen Changchuan; Jiang Haiyang; Liang Hong; Chen Jian; Yao Liping; Jia Qingbin; Sun Senlin; Zheng Xianwei	Japan (JPN); Yasunori Tanabe; Hidekazu Hayashi; Hiroyoshi Matsui; Satoru Miyoshi; Hiroshi Mitome; Kazuhiko Kurata; Masateru Kiriyama; Michinori Iwaguro; Yasushi Hori	South Korea (KOR); Kim Woong-hak; Hwang Hee-taek; Lee Hyung-ki; Ha Jin-sik; Lee Ki-hyun; Yoon Nam-ho; An Sang-jin; Hong Seong-kyun; Kim Sung-soo
1994 Hiroshima	China (CHN); Li Jianxin; Cai Yukun; Zhang Binggui; Sun Jun; Tian Qiqiang; Sun Senlin; Zheng Xianwei; Hu Jiaqi; Cao Junwei	Japan (JPN); Tatsuya Mizutani; Hidekazu Hayashi; Masahiko Nomura; Kazuhiko Kurata; Makoto Mura; Shigeyoshi Yanaka; Takamasa Sakai; Tetsuro Tanoue; Yukuo Ishitoya	South Korea (KOR); Lee Ki-hyun; Kim Sung-soo; Kim Chul-won; Suh Dae-mun; Her Hoi-young; Jang Hyun-chul; Lee Kan-ho; Kim Koo-hyun; Kim Tae-wook
2002 Busan	China (CHN); Chen Lingbu; Zhang Ningtao; Dong Wenfeng; Ma Weiguo; Tian Qiqiang; Chi Huanqi; Zhou Qiang; Li Xinghai; Zhang Dechang	Japan (JPN); Daisaku Takeda; Hitoshi Hase; Akio Yano; Yasunori Tanabe; Kazushige Ura; Kazuaki Mimoto; Atsushi Obata; Kenji Miura; Takehiro Kubo	Uzbekistan (UZB); Vitaliy Silayev; Dmitriy Tikhonov; Nasrullo Nazarov; Bahadir Davletyarov; Ruslan Bichurin; Sergey Makshov; Vladimir Tremasov; Dmitriy Krivo; Sergey Yoqubov
2010 Guangzhou	China (CHN); Zhu Ziqiang; Zhang Fangbing; Xue Feng; Zheng Xiaolong; Guo Xiaobing; Zhou Yinan; Qu Xiaoming; Wang Xiangdang; Zhang Dechang	India (IND); Lokesh Kumar; Satish Joshi; Saji Thomas; Jenil Krishnan; Anil Kumar; Ranjit Singh; Rajesh Kumar Yadav; Manjeet Singh; Girraj Singh	Uzbekistan (UZB); Zafar Usmonov; Sergey Tyan; Aleksandr Didrih; Damir Naurzaliev; Efim Kuznetsov; Botir Murodov; Yokub Khamzaev; Abdurasul Muhammadiev; Artyom Kudryashov
2014 Incheon	China (CHN); Cheng Xunman; Yang Dongdong; Zhao Longjie; Feng Jiahui; Ni Xulin; Liu Hang; Yang Zengxin; Li Dongjian; Zhang Shetian	Japan (JPN); Yu Kataoka; Yusuke Imai; Sumito Nakamura; Baku Hiraki; Mitsuo Nishimura; Kiyotaka Ito; Masato Kobayashi; Kenta Tadachi; Hiroki Sasano	India (IND); Kapil Sharma; Ranjit Singh; Bajrang Lal Takhar; P. U. Robin; Sawan Kumar Kalkal; Azad Mohammed; Maninder Singh; Davinder Singh; Ahmed Mohammed
2022 Hangzhou	China (CHN); Li Wenlei; Chen Xianfeng; Xu Qiao; Lü Li; Ji Gaoxing; Cai Pengpeng; Ni Xulin; Nie Yide; Liang Weixiong	India (IND); Neeraj; Naresh Kalwaniya; Neetish Kumar; Charanjeet Singh; Jaswinder Singh; Bheem Singh; Punit Kumar; Ashish; Dhananjay Pande	Indonesia (INA); Rifqi Harits Taufiqurahman; Kakan Kusmana; Sulpianto; Rendi Setia Maulana; Asuhan Pattiha; Ferdiansyah; Denri Maulidzar Al-Ghiffari; Ardi Isadi; Ujang Hasbulloh

=== Lightweight single sculls ===
Games	Gold	Silver	Bronze
1990 Beijing	Shen Hongfei (CHN)	Kim Il-yong (PRK)	Dalbir Singh (IND)
1998 Bangkok	Hua Lingjun (CHN)	Kim Il-yong (PRK)	Muhammad Akram (PAK)
2002 Busan	Zhu Zhifu (CHN)	Hitoshi Hase (JPN)	Law Hiu Fung (HKG)
2006 Doha	Wu Chongkui (CHN)	Daisaku Takeda (JPN)	Ruthtanaphol Theppibal (THA)
2010 Guangzhou	Mohsen Shadi (IRI)	Daisaku Takeda (JPN)	Artyom Kudryashov (UZB)
2014 Incheon	Lok Kwan Hoi (HKG)	Lee Hak-beom (KOR)	Dushyant Chauhan (IND)
2018 Jakarta–Palembang	Park Hyun-su (KOR)	Chiu Hin Chun (HKG)	Dushyant Chauhan (IND)
2026 Aichi–Nagoya	Chiu Hin Chun (HKG)	Amir Hossein Mahmoudpour (IRI)	Park Hyun-su (KOR)

=== Lightweight double sculls ===
Games	Gold	Silver	Bronze
1990 Beijing	China (CHN); Fang Shangiang; Xie Yifan	North Korea (PRK); Kim Gwang-il; Kim In-guk	India (IND); Dalbir Singh; Ramanjit Singh
1994 Hiroshima	Japan (JPN); Hiroshi Sugito; Kenichi Obinata	China (CHN); Cheng Hongzheng; Wu Lizhi	Hong Kong (HKG); Chau Fung Yau; Chiang Wing Hung
1998 Bangkok	China (CHN); Gao Bingrong; Liu Jian	Japan (JPN); Kazuaki Mimoto; Daisaku Takeda	North Korea (PRK); Ri Chol-jin; Kim Song-chol
2002 Busan	Japan (JPN); Daisaku Takeda; Kazushige Ura	China (CHN); Yang Maozong; Chen Hong	Philippines (PHI); Alvin Amposta; Nestor Cordova
2006 Doha	Japan (JPN); Takahiro Suda; Hideki Omoto	Thailand (THA); Ruthtanaphol Theppibal; Anupong Thainjam	India (IND); Kiran Yalamanchi; Bijender Singh
2010 Guangzhou	China (CHN); Zhang Guolin; Sun Jie	Hong Kong (HKG); So Sau Wah; Chow Kwong Wing	Japan (JPN); Kenta Tadachi; Kenta Kotani
2014 Incheon	Japan (JPN); Takahiro Suda; Hideki Omoto	Hong Kong (HKG); Chow Kwong Wing; Tang Chiu Mang	China (CHN); Dong Tianfeng; Kong Deming
2018 Jakarta–Palembang	Japan (JPN); Masayuki Miyaura; Masahiro Takeda	South Korea (KOR); Kim Byung-hoon; Lee Min-hyuk	India (IND); Rohit Kumar; Bhagwan Singh
2022 Hangzhou	China (CHN); Fan Junjie; Sun Man	India (IND); Arjun Lal Jat; Arvind Singh	Uzbekistan (UZB); Shakhzod Nurmatov; Sobirjon Safaroliev
2026 Aichi–Nagoya	Uzbekistan (UZB); Shakhzod Nurmatov; Sobirjon Safaroliev	Indonesia (INA); Rafiq Wijdan Yasir; Ali Mardiansyah	Hong Kong (HKG); Lam San Tung; Chan Tik Lun

=== Lightweight quadruple sculls ===
Games	Gold	Silver	Bronze
2014 Incheon	China (CHN); Yu Chenggang; Li Hui; Fan Junjie; Wang Tiexin	Hong Kong (HKG); Chow Kwong Wing; Tang Chiu Mang; Leung Chun Shek; Kwan Ki Cheong	Indonesia (INA); Ardi Isadi; Tanzil Hadid; Muhad Yakin; Ihram

=== Lightweight coxless four ===
Games	Gold	Silver	Bronze
1990 Beijing	China (CHN); Zheng Bingxue; Zhang Shaoyun; He Yaqiang; Zhao Zedong	Japan (JPN); Katsura Kajihara; Kiyoaki Murata; Masaru Higashitani; Yoshihiro Sogo	South Korea (KOR); Jo Jun-hyung; Jang Hyeon-cheol; Lee In-ki; Choi Kyung-wook
1994 Hiroshima	China (CHN); Shen Hongfei; Sun Guobin; Song Liangyou; Gong Xuhong	Japan (JPN); Michinori Iwaguro; Yoshihiro Sogo; Hiroyuki Ito; Katsuhiko Nakamizo	South Korea (KOR); Choi Kyung-wook; Han Jae-dong; Yoon Sang-jin; Hong Suk-ho
1998 Bangkok	China (CHN); Liu Zewu; Zhou Guoyang; Wang Xutao; Mao Zhixing	Japan (JPN); Yoshitomo Kitanoue; Atsushi Obata; Hiroya Sato; Kazushige Ura	India (IND); B. K. K. Thankachan; Rampal Singh; Pappi Singh; Kasam Khan
2002 Busan	China (CHN); Wang Linfei; Li Haitao; Huang Zhigang; Zhang Guoyang	Japan (JPN); Akio Yano; Kazuaki Mimoto; Takehiro Kubo; Atsushi Obata	Indonesia (INA); Rodiaman; Rahmat; Agus Budi Aji; Aldino Maryandi
2010 Guangzhou	Japan (JPN); Yoshinori Sato; Takahiro Suda; Yu Kataoka; Hideki Omoto	India (IND); Lokesh Kumar; Satish Joshi; Rajesh Kumar Yadav; Manjeet Singh	Hong Kong (HKG); Leung Chun Shek; Liao Shun Yin; Tang Chiu Mang; Kwan Ki Cheong
2018 Jakarta–Palembang	China (CHN); Xiong Xiong; Lü Fanpu; Zhao Chao; Zhou Xuewu	Indonesia (INA); Ali Buton; Ferdiansyah; Ihram; Ardi Isadi	Uzbekistan (UZB); Islambek Mambetnazarov; Shekhroz Hakimov; Otamurod Rakhimov; Zafar Usmonov

=== Lightweight eight ===
Games	Gold	Silver	Bronze
2018 Jakarta–Palembang	Indonesia (INA); Tanzil Hadid; Muhad Yakin; Rio Rizki Darmawan; Jefri Ardianto; Ali Buton; Ferdiansyah; Ihram; Ardi Isadi; Ujang Hasbulloh	Uzbekistan (UZB); Islambek Mambetnazarov; Anatoliy Krasnov; Alisher Yarov; Shekhroz Hakimov; Shokhjakhon Najmiev; Zafar Usmonov; Otamurod Rakhimov; Dostonjon Bahriev; Dostonjon Khursanov	Hong Kong (HKG); Kenneth Liu; Chau Yee Ping; James Wong; Tang Chiu Mang; Lam San Tung; Yuen Yun Lam; Leung Chun Shek; Wong Wai Kin; Cheung Ming Hang

== Women ==
=== Single sculls ===
Games	Gold	Silver	Bronze
1986 Seoul	Chen Changfeng (CHN)	Han Hye-soon (KOR)	Ayuko Tanaka (JPN)
1990 Beijing	Cao Mianying (CHN)	Ro Hong-sun (PRK)	Kang Sin-sook (KOR)
1994 Hiroshima	Cao Mianying (CHN)	Ho Kim Fai (HKG)	Kim Mi-jung (KOR)
1998 Bangkok	Zhang Xiuyun (CHN)	Fenella Ng (HKG)	Junko Kano (JPN)
2002 Busan	Zhang Xiuyun (CHN)	Naoe Harada (JPN)	Lee Eun-hwa (KOR)
2006 Doha	Jin Ziwei (CHN)	Ai Fukuchi (JPN)	Pere Karoba (INA)
2010 Guangzhou	Tang Bin (CHN)	Shin Yeong-eun (KOR)	Zarrina Mihaylova (UZB)
2014 Incheon	Kim Ye-ji (KOR)	Lee Ka Man (HKG)	Tạ Thanh Huyền (VIE)
2018 Jakarta–Palembang	Chen Yunxia (CHN)	Huang Yi-ting (TPE)	Alexandra Opachanova (KAZ)
2022 Hangzhou	Anna Prakaten (UZB)	Liu Ruiqi (CHN)	Shiho Yonekawa (JPN)
2026 Aichi–Nagoya	Zhang Xinyu (CHN)	Anna Prakaten (UZB)	Fatemeh Mojallal (IRI)

=== Double sculls ===
Games	Gold	Silver	Bronze
2002 Busan	China (CHN); Dang Junling; Li Qin	Japan (JPN); Akiko Iwamoto; Atsuko Yamauchi	North Korea (PRK); Ri Ryon-hwa; Kim Mi-sun
2006 Doha	China (CHN); Tian Liang; Li Qin	South Korea (KOR); Kim Ok-kyung; Shin Yeong-eun	Kazakhstan (KAZ); Mariya Filimonova; Inga Dudchenko
2010 Guangzhou	China (CHN); Jin Ziwei; Tian Liang	Vietnam (VIE); Phạm Thị Huệ; Phạm Thị Thảo	South Korea (KOR); Ko Young-eun; Im Eun-ju
2014 Incheon	China (CHN); Duan Jingli; Lü Yang	Kazakhstan (KAZ); Mariya Vassilyeva; Svetlana Germanovich	Thailand (THA); Rojjana Raklao; Phuttharaksa Neegree
2018 Jakarta–Palembang	China (CHN); Jiang Yan; Li Jingjing	South Korea (KOR); Kim Seul-gi; Kim Ye-ji	Iran (IRI); Maryam Karami; Parisa Ahmadi
2022 Hangzhou	China (CHN); Lu Shiyu; Shen Shuangmei	Iran (IRI); Mahsa Javer; Zeinab Norouzi	Thailand (THA); Nuntida Krajangjam; Parisa Chaempudsa
2026 Aichi–Nagoya	China (CHN); Wang Sixuan; Shen Shuangmei	Iran (IRI); Kimia Zareei; Zeinab Norouzi	Vietnam (VIE); Trần Thị Tú Uyên; Phạm Thị Bích Ngọc

=== Quadruple sculls ===
Games	Gold	Silver	Bronze
2014 Incheon	China (CHN); Wang Min; Shen Xiaoxing; Wang Yuwei; Zhang Xinyue	South Korea (KOR); Kim Seul-gi; Ma Se-rom; Jeon Seo-yeong; Kim A-rum	Vietnam (VIE); Lê Thị An; Phạm Thị Huệ; Phạm Thị Thảo; Phạm Thị Hài
2022 Hangzhou	China (CHN); Chen Yunxia; Zhang Ling; Lü Yang; Cui Xiaotong	Iran (IRI); Fatemeh Mojallal; Nazanin Malaei; Mahsa Javer; Zeinab Norouzi	Vietnam (VIE); Lường Thị Thảo; Bùi Thị Thu Hiền; Nguyễn Thị Giang; Phạm Thị Thảo
2026 Aichi–Nagoya	China (CHN); Xu Yixi; Li Yan; Han Mengyao; Jiao Siyu	Iran (IRI); Hengameh Kamyab; Soha Fakhri; Mahsa Javer; Saghi Maleki	Japan (JPN); Miho Ueno; Mao Kamidate; Hinako Ino; Mao Kadoya

=== Coxless pair ===
Games	Gold	Silver	Bronze
1986 Seoul	China (CHN); Yang Xiao; Zhang Xiuying	South Korea (KOR); Kong Jeong-bae; Kim Hae-kyung	Japan (JPN); Yoshiko Kawamori; Yuri Yajima
1990 Beijing	China (CHN); Zhou Shouying; Liu Xirong	South Korea (KOR); Lee Jae-nam; Kim Sung-ok	North Korea (PRK); Un Gum-nyo; Kim Yong-hui
1994 Hiroshima	China (CHN); Pei Jiayun; Jing Yanhua	South Korea (KOR); Kim Chung; Sun Yoo-sun	Japan (JPN); Rimi Kurahara; Shuko Matsumoto
2002 Busan	China (CHN); Zhang Xiuyun; Yang Cuiping	Uzbekistan (UZB); Sevara Ganieva; Anna Kuznetsova	South Korea (KOR); Beak Sun-mi; Kim Kyoung-mi
2010 Guangzhou	China (CHN); Lin Hong; Sun Zhengping	Kazakhstan (KAZ); Oxana Nazarova; Svetlana Germanovich	India (IND); Pramila Prava Minz; Pratima Puhan
2014 Incheon	China (CHN); Zhang Min; Miao Tian	South Korea (KOR); Jeon Seo-yeong; Kim Seo-hee	Kazakhstan (KAZ); Yekaterina Artemyeva; Viktoriya Chepikova
2018 Jakarta–Palembang	China (CHN); Ju Rui; Lin Xinyu	South Korea (KOR); Jeon Seo-yeong; Kim Seo-hee	Indonesia (INA); Julianti; Yayah Rokayah
2022 Hangzhou	China (CHN); Wang Tingting; Zhang Xuan	Hong Kong (HKG); Cheung Hoi Lam; Leung King Wan	South Korea (KOR); Kim Ha-yeong; Lee Soo-bin
2026 Aichi–Nagoya	China (CHN); Ren Wanning; Zhu Hongshan	Uzbekistan (UZB); Anna Aksenova; Aydana Smetullaeva	Vietnam (VIE); Đinh Thị Hảo; Phạm Thị Huệ

=== Coxless four ===
Games	Gold	Silver	Bronze
1990 Beijing	China (CHN); Guo Mei; He Yanwen; Hu Yadong; Zhang Li	Japan (JPN); Mayumi Oku; Miyuki Yamashita; Nobuko Ota; Rumi Sasakawa	South Korea (KOR); Kook In-sook; Kang Min-heung; Lee Jae-nam; Kim Sung-ok
1994 Hiroshima	China (CHN); Wang Shujuan; Liu Xirong; Liang Xiling; Jiang Zhifang	Japan (JPN); Hitomi Yamaguchi; Nami Sakamoto; Naomi Nakanishi; Naomi Wakasa	Chinese Taipei (TPE); Lin Chia-hui; Huang Shu-mei; Lin Ya-ting; Chuang Yen-chun
1998 Bangkok	China (CHN); Liu Lijuan; Yang Limei; Sun Guangxia; Liu Xiaochun	Kazakhstan (KAZ); Irina Dmitriyeva; Natalya Orlova; Vera Nabiyeva; Vera Filimonova	Chinese Taipei (TPE); Chen Li-chao; Yu Chen-chun; Feng Mei-hua; Chiu Hui-chen
2002 Busan	China (CHN); Cong Huanling; Yu Jing; Han Jing; Yan Na	Chinese Taipei (TPE); Chiang Chien-ju; Chi Yao-hsuan; Yu Chen-chun; Su Hui-ching	Uzbekistan (UZB); Sevara Ganieva; Albina Ahmerova; Zarrina Ganieva; Anna Kuznetsova
2006 Doha	China (CHN); Cheng Ran; Yu Chengxi; Gao Yanhua; Mu Suli	North Korea (PRK); Kang Kum-sun; Kim Ok-bun; Kim Ryon-ok; Yu Sun-ok	South Korea (KOR); Kim Soon-rye; Im Eun-seon; Eom Mi-seon; Min Su-hyoun
2010 Guangzhou	China (CHN); Ji Zhen; Li Xin; Liu Jiahuan; Ding Yanjie	South Korea (KOR); Lee Eun-hye; Kim Ka-yeong; Ra Hye-mi; Kim A-rum	Kazakhstan (KAZ); Mariya Filimonova; Yekaterina Artemyeva; Svetlana Germanovich; Oxana Nazarova
2018 Jakarta–Palembang	China (CHN); Yi Liqin; Guo Linlin; Zhang Min; Wang Fei	Vietnam (VIE); Đinh Thị Hảo; Trần Thị An; Lê Thị Hiền; Phạm Thị Huệ	Indonesia (INA); Chelsea Corputty; Wa Ode Fitri Rahmanjani; Julianti; Yayah Rokayah
2022 Hangzhou	China (CHN); Zhang Shuxian; Liu Xiaoxin; Wang Zifeng; Xu Xingye	Japan (JPN); Sahoko Kinota; Akiho Takano; Haruna Sakakibara; Sayaka Chujo	Vietnam (VIE); Phạm Thị Huệ; Đinh Thị Hảo; Hà Thị Vui; Dư Thị Bông
2026 Aichi–Nagoya	China (CHN); Zhang Shuxian; Li Duolei; Zhang Yangjing; Liu Yaqi	Uzbekistan (UZB); Raykhona Sattorova; Mariya Sergeeva; Anna Aksenova; Aydana Smetullaeva	Vietnam (VIE); Phạm Thị Ngọc Anh; Lê Thị Hiền; Hà Thị Vui; Dư Thị Bông

=== Coxed four ===
Games	Gold	Silver	Bronze
1986 Seoul	China (CHN); Li Ronghua; He Li; Zhou Xiuhua; Ma Yumin; Li Hongbing	South Korea (KOR); Lee Byung-in; Kook In-sook; Kang Min-heung; Joung Mong-ock; Nam Sang-lan	Japan (JPN); Kaoru Seki; Mayumi Oku; Mieko Sakurai; Miki Fujiyama; Sayoko Enoki

=== Eight ===
Games	Gold	Silver	Bronze
2022 Hangzhou	China (CHN); Zhang Shuxian; Yu Siyuan; Bao Lijun; Dong Xiya; Zhang Hairong; Liu Xiaoxin; Wang Zifeng; Xu Xingye; Xu Xiaohan	Japan (JPN); Emi Hirouchi; Urara Kakishima; Chiaki Tomita; Akiho Takano; Haruna Sakakibara; Sahoko Kinota; Shiho Yonekawa; Sayaka Chujo; Saki Senda	Vietnam (VIE); Hồ Thị Lý; Trần Thị Kiệt; Phạm Thị Ngọc Anh; Lê Thị Hiền; Hà Thị Vui; Đinh Thị Hảo; Phạm Thị Huệ; Dư Thị Bông; Nguyễn Lâm Kiều Diễm

=== Lightweight single sculls ===
Games	Gold	Silver	Bronze
1990 Beijing	Liang Sanmei (CHN)	Ryoko Orihashi (JPN)	Kim Yeon-hee (KOR)
1998 Bangkok	Ou Shaoyan (CHN)	Fenella Ng (HKG)	Phuttharaksa Neegree (THA)
2002 Busan	Fu Fengjun (CHN)	Phuttharaksa Neegree (THA)	Yung Ka Yan (HKG)
2006 Doha	Xu Dongxiang (CHN)	Lee Ka Man (HKG)	Phuttharaksa Neegree (THA)
2010 Guangzhou	Eri Wakai (JPN)	Ji Yoo-jin (KOR)	Bussayamas Phaengkathok (THA)
2014 Incheon	Ji Yoo-jin (KOR)	Lee Ka Man (HKG)	Soulmaz Abbasi (IRI)
2018 Jakarta–Palembang	Pan Dandan (CHN)	Nazanin Malaei (IRI)	Lee Ka Man (HKG)
2026 Aichi–Nagoya	Fatemeh Mojallal (IRI)	Winne Hung (HKG)	Parisa Chaempudsa (THA)

=== Lightweight double sculls ===
Games	Gold	Silver	Bronze
1990 Beijing	China (CHN); Liao Xiaoli; Huang Jielan	North Korea (PRK); Pae Jong-ae; Sung Ok-sun	Japan (JPN); Kazuyo Urakami; Maki Kurihara
1994 Hiroshima	China (CHN); Zhong Aifang; Ou Shaoyan	Japan (JPN); Eri Nonaka; Rie Saito	Hong Kong (HKG); Tsang Hau Yuk; Malina Ngai
1998 Bangkok	China (CHN); Fan Ruihua; Ou Shaoyan	Japan (JPN); Akiko Iwamoto; Yoshie Sugiyama	North Korea (PRK); Ri Son-yong; Mun Won-ok
2002 Busan	China (CHN); Xu Dongxiang; Wang Yanni	Thailand (THA); Phuttharaksa Neegree; Bussayamas Phaengkathok	Japan (JPN); Kahori Uchiyama; Yumi Uoshita
2006 Doha	Uzbekistan (UZB); Sevara Ganieva; Zarrina Ganieva	Japan (JPN); Akiko Iwamoto; Eri Wakai	Thailand (THA); Phuttharaksa Neegree; Bussayamas Phaengkathok
2010 Guangzhou	China (CHN); Huang Wenyi; Pan Feihong	Japan (JPN); Akiko Iwamoto; Atsumi Fukumoto	South Korea (KOR); Kim Myung-shin; Kim Sol-ji
2014 Incheon	China (CHN); Zhang Huan; Chen Le	Japan (JPN); Eri Wakai; Asumi Suehiro	Thailand (THA); Rojjana Raklao; Phuttharaksa Neegree
2018 Jakarta–Palembang	China (CHN); Liang Guoru; Wu Qiang	Iran (IRI); Nazanin Rahmani; Maryam Omidi Parsa	Thailand (THA); Matinee Raruen; Phuttharaksa Neegree
2022 Hangzhou	China (CHN); Zou Jiaqi; Qiu Xiuping	Uzbekistan (UZB); Luizakhon Islomova; Malika Tagmatova	Indonesia (INA); Chelsea Corputty; Mutiara Rahma Putri
2026 Aichi–Nagoya	Iran (IRI); Kimia Zareei; Zeinab Norouzi	Hong Kong (HKG); Cheung Yuen Shan; Leung Wing Wun	Japan (JPN); Chika Yonezawa; Chiaki Tomita

=== Lightweight quadruple sculls ===
Games	Gold	Silver	Bronze
1998 Bangkok	China (CHN); Fan Ruihua; Shen Senping; Peng Ying; Liu Bili	Japan (JPN); Aiko Asano; Yoshie Sugiyama; Junko Kano; Akiko Iwamoto	North Korea (PRK); Kim Mi-sun; Rim Kum-suk; Mun Won-ok; Ri Son-yong
2010 Guangzhou	China (CHN); Yan Shimin; Wang Xinnan; Liu Jing; Liu Tingting	Vietnam (VIE); Trần Thị Sâm; Nguyễn Thị Hựu; Phạm Thị Hài; Đặng Thị Thắm	Iran (IRI); Nasim Benyaghoub; Maryam Saeidi; Soulmaz Abbasi; Homeira Barzegar
2014 Incheon	China (CHN); Guo Shuai; Pan Dandan; Chen Cuiming; Huang Wenyi	Vietnam (VIE); Lê Thị An; Phạm Thị Huệ; Phạm Thị Thảo; Phạm Thị Hài	Iran (IRI); Homeira Barzegar; Nazanin Malaei; Mahsa Javer; Soulmaz Abbasi
2018 Jakarta–Palembang	Vietnam (VIE); Lường Thị Thảo; Hồ Thị Lý; Tạ Thanh Huyền; Phạm Thị Thảo	Iran (IRI); Maryam Karami; Mahsa Javer; Nazanin Rahmani; Maryam Omidi Parsa	South Korea (KOR); Jung Hye-ri; Ku Bo-yeun; Choi Yu-ri; Ji Yoo-jin

=== Lightweight coxless four ===
Games	Gold	Silver	Bronze
1990 Beijing	China (CHN); Zhang Huajie; Zeng Meilan; Lin Zhiai; Yan Dongling	North Korea (PRK); Chon Gyong-ok; Ro Hyong-suk; Choi Ryong-sun; Kim Yong-ae	Indonesia (INA); Juliati; Nelliewatiy; Tuah; Tutie
1994 Hiroshima	China (CHN); Zhong Aifang; Ou Shaoyan; Wang Fang; Ding Yahong	Japan (JPN); Kazuyo Urakami; Miyuki Yamashita; Michiyo Morishita; Yukiko Ochi	None awarded
