= Rowing at the 1988 Summer Olympics =

Rowing at the Games of the XXIV Olympiad
- Venue: Misari Regatta Course
- Date: 19–25 September 1988
- No. of events: 14
- Competitors: 593 (399 men, 194 women) from 38 nations

Rowing at the 1988 Summer Olympics in Seoul featured 14 events in total, for men and women, held on the Han River Regatta Course.

The women's quadruple sculls event was held without coxswain for the first time at this Olympics (from its debut in 1976 through 1984 it was coxed for women and coxless for men).

== Medal table ==
| Rank | Nation | Gold | Silver | Bronze | Total |
|---|---|---|---|---|---|
| 1 | East Germany | 8 | 1 | 1 | 10 |
| 2 | Italy | 2 | 0 | 0 | 2 |
| 3 | Romania | 1 | 4 | 2 | 7 |
| 4 | West Germany | 1 | 1 | 1 | 3 |
| 5 | Great Britain | 1 | 0 | 1 | 2 |
| 6 | Netherlands | 1 | 0 | 0 | 1 |
| 7 | Soviet Union | 0 | 2 | 1 | 3 |
| 7 | United States | 0 | 2 | 1 | 3 |
| 9 | Bulgaria | 0 | 1 | 2 | 3 |
| 10 | China | 0 | 1 | 1 | 2 |
| 11 | Norway | 0 | 1 | 0 | 1 |
| 11 | Switzerland | 0 | 1 | 0 | 1 |
| 13 | New Zealand | 0 | 0 | 3 | 3 |
| 14 | Yugoslavia | 0 | 0 | 1 | 1 |
| Totals (14 entries) | | 14 | 14 | 14 | 42 |

=== Men's events ===
| Games | Gold | Silver | Bronze |
|---|---|---|---|
| Single sculls (1x) | Thomas Lange; East Germany | Peter-Michael Kolbe; West Germany | Eric Verdonk; New Zealand |
| Double sculls (2x) | Nico Rienks and Ronald Florijn; Netherlands | Beat Schwerzmann and Ueli Bodenmann; Switzerland | Oleksandr Marchenko and Vasil Yakusha; Soviet Union |
| Quadruple sculls (4x) | Italy; Agostino Abbagnale; Davide Tizzano; Gianluca Farina; Piero Poli | Norway; Alf Hansen; Rolf Thorsen; Lars Bjønness; Vetle Vinje | East Germany; Jens Köppen; Steffen Zühlke; Steffen Bogs; Heiko Habermann |
| Coxless pair (2-) | Andy Holmes and Steve Redgrave; Great Britain | Dănuț Dobre and Dragoș Neagu; Romania | Sadik Mujkič and Bojan Prešern; Yugoslavia |
| Coxed pair (2+) | Italy; Carmine Abbagnale; Giuseppe Abbagnale; Giuseppe Di Capua (cox) | East Germany; Mario Streit; Detlef Kirchhoff; René Rensch (cox) | Great Britain; Andy Holmes; Steve Redgrave; Patrick Sweeney (cox) |
| Coxless four (4-) | East Germany; Roland Schröder; Ralf Brudel; Olaf Förster; Thomas Greiner | United States; Raoul Rodriguez; Thomas Bohrer; Richard Kennelly; David Krmpotich | West Germany; Guido Grabow; Volker Grabow; Norbert Keßlau; Jörg Puttlitz |
| Coxed four (4+) | East Germany; Bernd Niesecke; Hendrik Reiher (cox); Karsten Schmeling; Bernd Eichwurzel; Frank Klawonn | Romania; Dimitrie Popescu; Ioan Snep; Vasile Tomoiagă; Ladislau Lovrenschi (cox); Valentin Robu | New Zealand; Chris White; Ian Wright; Andrew Bird (cox); Greg Johnston; George Keys |
| Eight (8+) | West Germany; Bahne Rabe; Eckhardt Schultz; Ansgar Wessling; Wolfgang Maennig; Matthias Mellinghaus; Thomas Möllenkamp; Thomas Domian; Armin Eichholz; Manfred Klein (cox) | Soviet Union; Viktor Omelyanovich; Vasily Tikhonov; Andrey Vasilyev; Pavlo Hurkovskiy; Nikolay Komarov; Veniamin But; Viktor Diduk; Aleksandr Dumchev; Aleksandr Lukyanov (cox) | United States; Mike Teti; Jonathan Smith; Ted Patton; Jack Rusher; Peter Nordell; Jeffrey McLaughlin; Doug Burden; John Pescatore; Seth Bauer (cox) |

=== Women's events ===
| Games | Gold | Silver | Bronze |
|---|---|---|---|
| Single sculls (1x) | Jutta Behrendt; East Germany | Anne Marden; United States | Magdalena Georgieva; Bulgaria |
| Double sculls (2x) | Birgit Peter and Martina Schröter; East Germany | Elisabeta Lipă and Veronica Cogeanu; Romania | Violeta Ninova and Stefka Madina; Bulgaria |
| Quadruple sculls (4x) | East Germany; Kerstin Förster; Kristina Mundt; Beate Schramm; Jana Sorgers | Soviet Union; Irina Kalimbet; Svitlana Maziy; Inna Frolova; Antonina Zelikovich | Romania; Anișoara Bălan; Anişoara Minea; Veronica Cogeanu; Elisabeta Lipă |
| Coxless pair (2-) | Rodica Arba and Olga Homeghi; Romania | Radka Stoyanova and Lalka Berberova; Bulgaria | Nikki Payne and Lynley Hannen; New Zealand |
| Coxed four (4+) | East Germany; Martina Walther; Gerlinde Doberschütz; Carola Hornig; Birte Siech; Sylvia Rose | China; Zhang Xianghua; Hu Yadong; Yang Xiao; Zhou Shouying; Li Ronghua | Romania; Marioara Trașcă; Veronica Necula; Herta Anitaș; Doina Șnep-Bălan; Ecaterina Oancia |
| Eight (8+) | East Germany; Annegret Strauch; Judith Zeidler; Kathrin Haacker; Ute Wild; Anja Kluge; Beatrix Schröer; Ramona Balthasar; Ute Stange; Daniela Neunast | Romania; Doina Șnep-Bălan; Veronica Necula; Herta Anitaș; Marioara Trașcă; Adriana Bazon; Mihaela Armășescu; Rodica Arba; Olga Homeghi; Ecaterina Oancia | China; Zhou Xiuhua; Zhang Yali; He Yanwen; Han Yaqin; Zhang Xianghua; Zhou Shouying; Yang Xiao; Hu Yadong; Li Ronghua |

== See also ==
- Rowers at the 1988 Summer Olympics
