= Rowing at the 1986 Asian Games =

- Venue: Misari Regatta
- Dates: 22–25 September 1986

For the Rowing competition at the 1986 Asian Games in Misari Regatta, South Korea, men's and women's singles, doubles, and fours competed from September 22 to September 25.

== Medalists ==
=== Men ===
Event	Gold	Silver	Bronze
Single sculls	Liu Qun; China	Shunsuke Horiuchi; Japan	Go Dong-hi; South Korea
Coxless pair	Japan; Satoru Miyoshi; Tadashi Abe	China; Gu Jiahong; Tang Hongwei	South Korea; Lee Sang-gyu; Yoo Seong-joon
Coxed pair	China; Chen Lianjia; Wang Hongbing; Yan Jun	Japan; Hidekazu Hayashi; Hiroyoshi Matsui; Tokuhisa Watai	South Korea; Chung In-kyo; Sin Seung-ho; Hyun Song-in
Coxed four	China; Li Jianxin; Gao Yuhua; Wang Hongbing; Yan Jun; Chen Zhiqiang	South Korea; Lee Bong-su; Lee Hae-dal; Lee Sung-kyun; Kim Woong-hak; Sun Woo-sang	Japan; Akihisa Hirata; Hiromitsu Fukagawa; Kunihiko Obayashi; Masahiko Nomura; Tomoyuki Okano
Eight	China; Li Jianxin; Gao Yuhua; Chen Zhiqiang; Zheng Kangsheng; Yu Hanqiao; Xu Quan; Wang Xinyue; He Dongjiang; Zhu Ledan	Japan; Eiichi Tsukinoki; Hideaki Maeguchi; Iwayuki Hirota; Katsuyuki Kato; Motohisa Kyuno; Setsuo Morizane; Toshihiko Yagi; Toshihiro Murakami; Yukiyori Ishita	South Korea; Chung Boo-young; Kim Gyu-hwan; Lee Hong-keun; Lim Jong-soon; Lee Jung-kwea; Park Seung-deuk; Park Sung-lae; Park Sung-kuk; Jeong Yeon-kil

=== Women ===
Event	Gold	Silver	Bronze
Single sculls	Chen Changfeng; China	Han Hye-soon; South Korea	Ayuko Tanaka; Japan
Coxless pair	China; Yang Xiao; Zhang Xiuying	South Korea; Kong Jeong-bae; Kim Hae-kyung	Japan; Yoshiko Kawamori; Yuri Yajima
Coxed four	China; Li Ronghua; He Li; Zhou Xiuhua; Ma Yumin; Li Hongbing	South Korea; Lee Byung-in; Kook In-sook; Kang Min-heung; Joung Mong-ock; Nam Sang-lan	Japan; Kaoru Seki; Mayumi Oku; Mieko Sakurai; Miki Fujiyama; Sayoko Enoki

== Medal table ==
Rank	Nation	Gold	Silver	Bronze	Total
1	China (CHN)	7	1	0	8
2	Japan (JPN)	1	3	4	8
3	South Korea (KOR)	0	4	4	8
Totals (3 entries)		8	8	8	24
