= Rowing at the 1988 Summer Olympics – Men's eight =

Men's eight at the Games of the XXIV Olympiad
- Rowing pictogram
- Venue: Misari Regatta
- Dates: 20–25 September 1988
- Competitors: 90 from 10 nations
- Winning time: 5:46.05

Medalists
1st place, gold medalist(s)		West Germany: Bahne Rabe; Eckhardt Schultz; Ansgar Wessling; Wolfgang Maennig; Matthias Mellinghaus; Thomas Möllenkamp; Thomas Domian; Armin Eichholz; Manfred Klein
2nd place, silver medalist(s)		Soviet Union: Viktor Omelyanovich; Vasily Tikhonov; Andrey Vasilyev; Pavlo Hurkovskiy; Nikolay Komarov; Veniamin But; Viktor Diduk; Aleksandr Dumchev; Aleksandr Lukyanov
3rd place, bronze medalist(s)		United States: Mike Teti; Jonathan Smith; Ted Patton; Jack Rusher; Peter Nordell; Jeffrey McLaughlin; Doug Burden; John Pescatore; Seth Bauer

The men's eight competition at the 1988 Summer Olympics took place at Misari Regatta, South Korea. It was held from 20 to 25 September. There were 10 boats (90 competitors) from 10 nations, with each nation limited to a single boat in the event. The event was won by West Germany, the nation's first victory (and first medal) in the men's eight since 1968. It was West Germany's second gold medal in the event, tying Great Britain and East Germany for second-most, behind the United States with 11. In a photo finish for second place, the Soviet Union took silver over the United States.

== Background ==
This was the 20th appearance of the event. Rowing had been on the programme in 1896 but was cancelled due to bad weather. The men's eight has been held every time that rowing has been contested, beginning in 1900.

The United States had dominated the men's eight for four decades from the 1920s through the 1950s, but had not taken Olympic gold since 1964. A victory in the 1987 World Rowing Championships set up the Americans as favourites to return to the top of the Olympic podium, particularly as the East Germans (a power in the event in the 1970s and 1980s) were not competing for the second straight Games. Other significant contenders were the 1985 World champions the Soviet Union and the 1986 World champions Australia.

No nations made their debut in the event. The United States made its 17th appearance, most among nations to that point.

== Competition format ==
The "eight" event featured nine-person boats, with eight rowers and a coxswain. It was a sweep rowing event, with the rowers each having one oar (and thus each rowing on one side). The course used the 2000 metres distance that became the Olympic standard in 1912 (with the exception of 1948). Races were held in up to six lanes.

The competition consisted of two main rounds (heats and finals) as well as a repechage. The 10 boats were divided into two heats for the first round, with 5 boats in each heat. The winner of each heat (2 boats total) advanced directly to the "A" final. The remaining 8 boats were placed in the repechage. The repechage featured two heats of 4 boats each, with the top two boats in each heat (4 boats total) advancing to the "A" final and the remaining 4 boats (3rd and 4th placers in the repechage heats) being eliminated from medal contention and sent to the "B" final to determine 7th through 10th places.

== Schedule ==
All times are Korea Standard Time adjusted for daylight savings (UTC+10)

Date	Time	Round
Tuesday, 20 September 1988	12:28	Semifinals
Wednesday, 21 September 1988	15:32	Repechage
Friday, 23 September 1988	11:46	Final B
Sunday, 25 September 1988	12:16	Final A

== Results ==
=== Semifinals ===
==== Semifinal 1 ====
Rank	Rowers	Coxswain	Nation	Time	Notes
1	Veniamin But; Viktor Diduk; Aleksandr Dumchev; Pavlo Hurkovskiy; Mykola Komarov; Viktor Omelyanovich; Vasily Tikhonov; Andrey Vasilyev	Aleksandr Lukyanov	Soviet Union	5:34.95	QA
2	Andrew Crosby; Jason Dorland; Grant Main; Kevin Neufeld; Jamie Schaffer; Paul Steele; Don Telfer; John Wallace	Brian McMahon	Canada	5:36.81	R
3	Peter Beaumont; Nicholas Burfitt; Terence Dillon; Salih Hassan; Anton Obholzer; Richard Stanhope; Gavin Stewart; Stephen Turner	Simon Jefferies	Great Britain	5:38.18	R
4	Antonio Baldacci; Ettore Bulgarelli; Piero Carletto; Giuseppe Di Palo; Renato Gaeta; Giovanni Suarez; Annibale Venier; Franco Zucchi	Dino Lucchetta	Italy	5:43.11	R
5	Go Gwang-seon; Ha Jin-sik; Hyeon Seong-in; Im Jae-man; Jeong Bu-yeong; Jeong Gwang-su; Kim Gap-sik; Lee Hong-geun	Jeong In-gyo	South Korea	6:15.40	R

==== Semifinal 2 ====
Rank	Rowers	Coxswain	Nation	Time	Notes
1	Thomas Domian; Armin Eichholz; Wolfgang Maennig; Matthias Mellinghaus; Thomas Möllenkamp; Bahne Rabe; Eckhardt Schultz; Ansgar Wessling	Manfred Klein	West Germany	5:32.36	QA
2	Andrew Cooper; Mark Doyle; Steve Evans; James Galloway; Mike McKay; Hamish McLachlan; Ion Popa; James Tomkins	Dale Caterson	Australia	5:33.94	R
3	Doug Burden; Jeffrey McLaughlin; Peter Nordell; Ted Patton; John Pescatore; Jack Rusher; Jonathan Smith; Mike Teti	Seth Bauer	United States	5:39.26	R
4	Rumen Aleksiev; Emil Bondev; Yuri Dyulgerov; Ivo Gelov; Dimitar Kamburski; Ivan Stanev; Dimitar Tonchev; Nikola Zlatanov	Ventseslav Kanchev	Bulgaria	5:48.25	R
5	Tadashi Abe; Seiji Chihara; Akihisa Hirata; Shunsuke Kawamoto; Hideaki Maeguchi; Masahiko Nomura; Tomoyuki Okano; Eiichi Tsukinoki	Yukiyasu Ishikawa	Japan	5:57.11	R

=== Repechage ===
==== Repechage heat 1 ====
Rank	Rowers	Coxswain	Nation	Time	Notes
1	Doug Burden; Jeffrey McLaughlin; Peter Nordell; Ted Patton; John Pescatore; Jack Rusher; Jonathan Smith; Mike Teti	Seth Bauer	United States	5:35.63	QA
2	Andrew Crosby; Jason Dorland; Grant Main; Kevin Neufeld; Jamie Schaffer; Paul Steele; Don Telfer; John Wallace	Brian McMahon	Canada	5:37.06	QA
3	Antonio Baldacci; Ettore Bulgarelli; Piero Carletto; Giuseppe Di Palo; Renato Gaeta; Giovanni Suarez; Annibale Venier; Franco Zucchi	Dino Lucchetta	Italy	5:39.86	QB
4	Tadashi Abe; Seiji Chihara; Akihisa Hirata; Shunsuke Kawamoto; Hideaki Maeguchi; Masahiko Nomura; Tomoyuki Okano; Eiichi Tsukinoki	Yukiyasu Ishikawa	Japan	5:54.16	QB

==== Repechage heat 2 ====
Rank	Rowers	Coxswain	Nation	Time	Notes
1	Peter Beaumont; Nicholas Burfitt; Terence Dillon; Salih Hassan; Anton Obholzer; Richard Stanhope; Gavin Stewart; Stephen Turner	Simon Jefferies	Great Britain	5:35.15	QA
2	Andrew Cooper; Mark Doyle; Steve Evans; James Galloway; Mike McKay; Hamish McLachlan; Ion Popa; James Tomkins	Dale Caterson	Australia	5:37.75	QA
3	Rumen Aleksiev; Emil Bondev; Yuri Dyulgerov; Ivo Gelov; Dimitar Kamburski; Ivan Stanev; Dimitar Tonchev; Nikola Zlatanov	Ventseslav Kanchev	Bulgaria	5:40.93	QB
4	Go Gwang-seon; Ha Jin-sik; Hyeon Seong-in; Im Jae-man; Jeong Bu-yeong; Jeong Gwang-su; Kim Gap-sik; Lee Hong-geun	Jeong In-gyo	South Korea	6:17.81	QB

=== Finals ===
==== Final B ====
Rank	Rowers	Coxswain	Nation	Time
7	Antonio Baldacci; Ettore Bulgarelli; Piero Carletto; Giuseppe Di Palo; Renato Gaeta; Giovanni Suarez; Annibale Venier; Franco Zucchi	Dino Lucchetta	Italy	5:41.15
8	Rumen Aleksiev; Emil Bondev; Yuri Dyulgerov; Ivo Gelov; Dimitar Kamburski; Ivan Stanev; Dimitar Tonchev; Nikola Zlatanov	Ventseslav Kanchev	Bulgaria	5:49.99
9	Tadashi Abe; Seiji Chihara; Akihisa Hirata; Shunsuke Kawamoto; Hideaki Maeguchi; Masahiko Nomura; Tomoyuki Okano; Eiichi Tsukinoki	Yukiyasu Ishikawa	Japan	5:55.52
10	Go Gwang-seon; Ha Jin-sik; Hyeon Seong-in; Im Jae-man; Jeong Bu-yeong; Jeong Gwang-su; Kim Gap-sik; Lee Hong-geun	Jeong In-gyo	South Korea	6:16.73

==== Final A ====
Rank	Rowers	Coxswain	Nation	Time
1st place, gold medalist(s)	Thomas Domian; Armin Eichholz; Wolfgang Maennig; Matthias Mellinghaus; Thomas Möllenkamp; Bahne Rabe; Eckhardt Schultz; Ansgar Wessling	Manfred Klein	West Germany	5:46.05
2nd place, silver medalist(s)	Veniamin But; Viktor Diduk; Aleksandr Dumchev; Pavlo Hurkovskiy; Mykola Komarov; Viktor Omelyanovich; Vasily Tikhonov; Andrey Vasilyev	Aleksandr Lukyanov	Soviet Union	5:48.01
3rd place, bronze medalist(s)	Doug Burden; Jeffrey McLaughlin; Peter Nordell; Ted Patton; John Pescatore; Jack Rusher; Jonathan Smith; Mike Teti	Seth Bauer	United States	5:48.26
4	Peter Beaumont; Nicholas Burfitt; Terence Dillon; Salih Hassan; Anton Obholzer; Richard Stanhope; Gavin Stewart; Stephen Turner	Simon Jefferies	Great Britain	5:51.59
5	Andrew Cooper; Mark Doyle; Steve Evans; James Galloway; Mike McKay; Hamish McLachlan; Ion Popa; James Tomkins	Dale Caterson	Australia	5:53.73
6	Andrew Crosby; Jason Dorland; Grant Main; Kevin Neufeld; Jamie Schaffer; Paul Steele; Don Telfer; John Wallace	Brian McMahon	Canada	5:54.26

== Final classification ==
Rank	Rowers	Coxswain	Nation
1st place, gold medalist(s)	Bahne Rabe; Eckhardt Schultz; Ansgar Wessling; Wolfgang Maennig; Matthias Mellinghaus; Thomas Möllenkamp; Thomas Domian; Armin Eichholz	Manfred Klein	West Germany
2nd place, silver medalist(s)	Viktor Omelyanovich; Vasily Tikhonov; Andrey Vasilyev; Pavlo Hurkovskiy; Nikolay Komarov; Veniamin But; Viktor Diduk; Aleksandr Dumchev	Aleksandr Lukyanov	Soviet Union
3rd place, bronze medalist(s)	Mike Teti; Jonathan Smith; Ted Patton; Jack Rusher; Peter Nordell; Jeffrey McLaughlin; Doug Burden; John Pescatore	Seth Bauer	United States
4	Richard Stanhope; Anton Obholzer; Peter Beaumont; Gavin Stewart; Terence Dillon; Salih Hassan; Stephen Turner; Nicholas Burfitt	Simon Jefferies (cox)	Great Britain
5	James Galloway; Hamish McLachlan; Andrew Cooper; Mike McKay; Mark Doyle; James Tomkins; Ion Popa; Steve Evans	Dale Caterson	Australia
6	Don Telfer; Kevin Neufeld; Jason Dorland; Andrew Crosby; Paul Steele; Grant Main; Jamie Schaffer; John Wallace	Brian McMahon	Canada
7	Antonio Baldacci; Ettore Bulgarelli; Piero Carletto; Giuseppe Di Palo; Renato Gaeta; Giovanni Suarez; Annibale Venier; Franco Zucchi	Dino Lucchetta	Italy
8	Rumen Aleksiev; Emil Bondev; Yuri Dyulgerov; Ivo Gelov; Dimitar Kamburski; Ventseslav Kanchev; Ivan Stanev; Dimitar Tonchev	Nikola Zlatanov	Bulgaria
9	Tadashi Abe; Seiji Chihara; Akihisa Hirata; Yukiyasu Ishikawa; Shunsuke Kawamoto; Hideaki Maeguchi; Masahiko Nomura; Tomoyuki Okano	Eiichi Tsukinoki	Japan
10	Jeong Bu-yeong; Jeong In-gyo; Jeong Gwang-su; Ha Jin-sik; Hyeon Seong-in; Kim Gap-sik; Go Gwang-seon; Lee Hong-geun	Im Jae-man	South Korea
