= Shunsuke =

- Gender: Male

Origin
- Origin: Japanese
- Meaning: Different meanings depending on the kanji used

Shunsuke (written: 俊介, 俊祐, 俊輔, 駿介, 駿佑, 駿輔, 峻介, 峻佑, 峻輔, 隼輔 or 竣介) is a masculine Japanese given name. Notable people with the name include:

- Shunsuke Andō (安藤 駿介; born 1990), Japanese footballer
- Shunsuke Chijiki (千々木 駿介; born 1989), Japanese volleyball player
- Shunsuke Daito (大東 駿介; born 1986), Japanese actor, talent and fashion model
- Shunsuke Fujikawa (藤川 俊介; born 1987), Japanese baseball player
- Shunsuke Fukuda (footballer, born 1986) (福田 俊介; born 1986), Japanese footballer
- Shunsuke Horiuchi (堀内 俊介; born 1959), Japanese rower
- Shunsuke Ikeda (池田 駿介; 1940–2010), Japanese actor and model
- Shunsuke Inoue (井上 俊輔; born 1985), Japanese volleyball player
- Shunsuke Ishikawa (石川 俊介; born 1985), Japanese baseball player
- Shunsuke Ito (伊藤 俊介; born 1976), Japanese swimmer
- Shunsuke Iwanuma (岩沼 俊介; born 1988), Japanese footballer
- Shunsuke Kaneto (金戸 俊介; born 1940), Japanese diver
- Shunsuke Kawamoto (川本 俊介; born 1962), Japanese rower
- Shunsuke Kazama (風間 俊介; born 1983), Japanese voice actor, actor and singer
- Shunsuke Kikuchi (菊池 俊輔; born 1931), Japanese composer
- Shunsuke Kikuchi (footballer) (菊地 俊介; born 1991), Japanese footballer
- Shunsuke Kiyokiba (清木場 俊介; born 1980), Japanese pop singer
- Shunsuke Komamura (駒村 俊介; born 1979), Japanese cross-country skier
- Shunsuke Kondo (近藤 駿介; 1890–1966), Japanese government official
- Shunsuke Maeda (前田 俊介; born 1986), Japanese footballer
- Shunsuke Matsumoto (松本 竣介; 1912–1948), Japanese painter
- Shunsuke Michieda (道枝 駿佑; born 2002), Japanese idol, singer and actor
- Shunsuke Miki (三木 俊介; born 1944), Japanese rower
- Shunsuke Miyake (三宅 俊輔; 1854–1926), Japanese physician
- Shunsuke Motegi (茂木 駿佑; born 1996), Japanese footballer
- Shunsuke Mutai (務台 俊介; born 1956), Japanese politician
- Shunsuke Nakamura (中村 俊輔; born 1978), Japanese footballer
- Shunsuke Nakatake (中武 駿介; born 1990), Japanese footballer
- Shunsuke Nishikawa (西川 俊介; born 1994), Japanese actor
- Shunsuke Nunomaki (布巻 峻介; born 1992), Japanese rugby union player
- Shunsuke Oyama (大山 俊輔; born 1986), Japanese footballer
- Shunsuke Sakuya (咲野 俊介; born 1965), Japanese actor and voice actor
- Shunsuke Sato (佐藤 俊介; born 1984), Japanese classical violinist and violist
- Shunsuke Shima (嶋 俊介; 1932–2003), Japanese actor and voice actor
- Shunsuke Sonoda (薗田 峻輔; born 1989), Japanese golfer
- Shunsuke Tachino (舘野 俊祐; born 1993), Japanese footballer
- Shunsuke Takeuchi (武内 駿輔; born 1997), Japanese voice actor
- Shunsuke Tsurumi (鶴見 俊輔; 1922–2015), Japanese historian and philosopher
- Shunsuke Tsutsumi (堤 俊輔; born 1987), Japanese footballer
- Shunsuke Ueda (植田 峻佑; born 1988), Japanese footballer
- Shunsuke Watanabe (渡辺 俊介; born 1976), Japanese baseball player

== See also ==
- Shunsuke Aoba (青葉春助), a character in the anime and manga series The Pumpkin Wine
- Shinsuke Nakamura (born 1980), a Japanese professional wrestler
- 29986 Shunsuke, a minor planet named after the footballer Shunsuke Nakamura
