= Rowing at the 1982 Asian Games =

- Venue: Jamwa Ramgarh Lake

For the Rowing competition at the 1982 Asian Games in India, men's singles, doubles, and fours competed. The competition was held at the Jamwa Ramgarh Lake near Jaipur.

== Medalists ==
Event	Gold	Silver	Bronze
Single sculls	Liu Qun; China	Shunsuke Horiuchi; Japan	North Korea
Coxless pair	China; Ye Binglai; Wang Deping	Japan	South Korea; Chung Jae-soo; Han Young-myong
Coxed pair	China; Xu Guoliang; Yan Jun; Li Jianxin	Japan	India; Pravin Uberoi; Mohammed Amin Naik; Deependra Tomar
Coxed four	China; Liu Weiping; Li Yibin; Wang Hongbing; Zhang Jinyu; Pan Hansheng	North Korea	South Korea; Park Jae-hyun; Ahn Hee-ku; Lee Byung-geun; Lee Jae-won; Jin Han-geun

== Medal table ==
Rank	Nation	Gold	Silver	Bronze	Total
1	China (CHN)	4	0	0	4
2	Japan (JPN)	0	3	0	3
3	North Korea (PRK)	0	1	1	2
4	South Korea (KOR)	0	0	2	2
5	India (IND)	0	0	1	1
Totals (5 entries)		4	4	4	12
