= Omelianovych =

Omelianovych (Ukrainian: Омелянович) or Omelyanovich (Ukrainian: Омелянович) is a Ukrainian surname. Notable people with the surname include:

- Ivan Omelianovych-Pavlenko (1881–1962), Ukrainian military officer
- Mariya Omelianovych (born 1960), Ukrainian rower
- Mykhailo Omelianovych-Pavlenko (1878–1952), Ukrainian military officer
- Viktor Omelyanovich (born 1958), Ukrainian rower
