= Antonio Baldacci =

Antonio Baldacci may refer to:

- Antonio Baldacci (rower) (born 1951), Italian rower
- Antonio Baldacci (botanist) (1867–1950), Italian botanist and geographer
