= Peter Beaumont =

Peter Beaumont may refer to:

- Peter Beaumont (archaeologist) (1935–2016), South African archaeologist
- Peter Beaumont (figure skater) (born 2001), ice dancer
- Peter Beaumont (journalist) (born 1961), British journalist
- Peter Beaumont (judge) (born 1944), British judge
- Peter Beaumont (racehorse trainer) (1934–2020), British racehorse trainer
- Peter Beaumont (rower) (born 1965), British Olympic rower

== See also ==
- Pete de Beaumont (1915–2010), American mechanical engineer
