= Akihisa =

- Gender: Male

Origin
- Origin: Japanese
- Meaning: Different meanings depending on the kanji used

Akihisa (written: 明久, 明央, 昭久, 晃久 or 瑛久) is a masculine Japanese given name. Notable people with the name include:

- Akihisa Hirata (平田 明久; born 1963), Japanese rower
- Akihisa Ikeda (池田 晃久; born 1976), Japanese manga artist
- Akihisa Makida (牧田 明久; born 1982), Japanese baseball player
- Akihisa Nagashima (長島 昭久; born 1962), Japanese politician
- Akihisa Nishida (西田 明央; born 1992), Japanese baseball player
- Akihisa Shiono (塩野 瑛久; born 1995), Japanese actor and model

== Fictional characters ==
- Akihisa Yoshii (吉井 明久), a character in the light novel series Baka and Test
