= Andrei Vasilyev =

Andrei Vasilyev may refer to:

- Andrey Vasilyev (born 1962), Russian rower
- Andrei Vasilyev (ice hockey) (born 1972), Russian ice hockey player
- Andrei Vasilyev (footballer) (born 1992), Russian footballer
