= Bulgarelli =

Bulgarelli is an Italian surname. Notable people with the surname include:

- Adelmo Bulgarelli (1932–1984), Italian wrestler
- Emilio Bulgarelli (1917–1993), Italian water polo player
- Ettore Bulgarelli (born 1965), Italian rower
- Giacomo Bulgarelli (1940–2009), Italian football midfielder
- Jason Bulgarelli (born 1976), Australian rugby league player
- Marianna Bulgarelli (c. 1684–1734), Italian soprano
- Otávio Bulgarelli (born 1984 ), Brazilian cyclist
