= Sylvia Schwabe =

East German rower (born 1962)

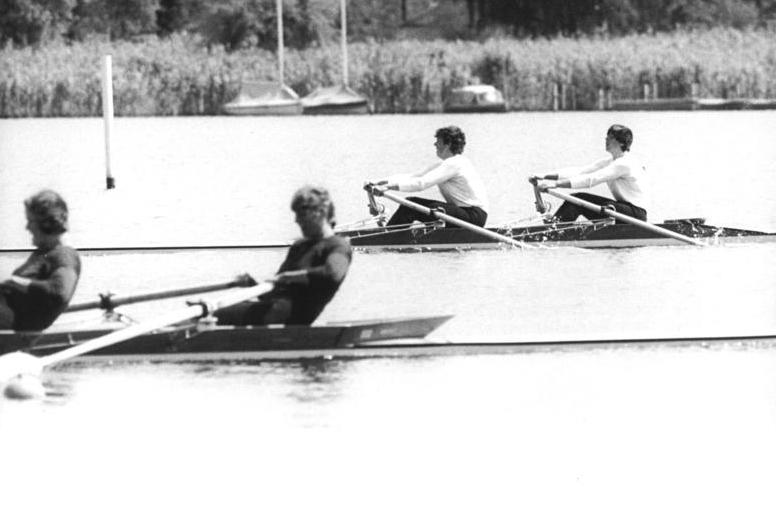
- Schwabe (right) winning the 1985 East German championships in double scull with Martina Schröter, defeating Birgit Peter and Ramona Balthasar

Personal information
- Born: 20 December 1962 (age 63)
- Height: 180 cm (5 ft 11 in)
- Weight: 76 kg (168 lb)

Sport
- Sport: Rowing
- Club: DHfK Leipzig SC
Medal record
Women's rowing
Representing East Germany
World Rowing Championships
Silver medal – second place	1983 Duisburg	Coxed quad sculls
Gold medal – first place	1985 Hazewinkel	Double sculls
Gold medal – first place	1986 Nottingham	Double sculls

Sylvia Schwabe (born 20 December 1962) is a rower who started for East Germany. In October 1986, she was awarded a Star of People's Friendship in gold (second class) for her sporting success.
