= Zlatinov =

Zlatinov (Bulgarian: Златинов) is a Bulgarian surname. Notable people with the surname include:

- Petar Zlatinov (born 1981), Bulgarian footballer
- Vladislav Zlatinov (born 1983), Bulgarian footballer

== See also ==
- Zlatanov
