= Obholzer =

Obholzer is a surname. Notable people with the surname include:

- Anton Obholzer (born 1968), British rower
- Rupert Obholzer (born 1970), British rower
