= Kawamoto =

Kawamoto (川本) (also written 河本 and 川元) is a Japanese surname. Notable people with the surname include:

- Evelyn Kawamoto (1933–2017), an American swimmer and two-time Olympic medalist
- Genshiro Kawamoto (born 1932), Japanese billionaire
- Homura Kawamoto, Japanese manga artist
- Kihachirō Kawamoto (1925–2010), Japanese animator
- Kohei Kawamoto (born 1979), Japanese butterfly swimmer
- Kunihiro Kawamoto (born 1975), Japanese voice actor
- Makoto Kawamoto (born 1974), Japanese singer-songwriter
- Nobuhiko Kawamoto (born 1936), former CEO of Honda Motor
- Shota Kawamoto (born 1996), Japanese para-cyclist
- Shunsuke Kawamoto (川本 俊介; born 1962), Japanese rower
- Taizo Kawamoto (1914–1985), Japanese football player and manager
- Tamayo Kawamoto (河本 圭代), Japanese video game composer
- Toshihiro Kawamoto (born 1963), Japanese animator

== See also ==
- Kawamoto, Saitama, former town located in Saitama, Japan
- Kawamoto, Shimane, town located in Shimane, Japan
