= Hamish McLachlan (rower) =

Australian rower (1967–2020)

Personal information
- Nationality: Australian
- Born: 27 July 1967
- Died: 21 December 2020 (aged 53)

Sport
- Sport: Rowing

Hamish McLachlan (27 July 1967 – 21 December 2020) was an Australian rower. He competed in the men's eight event at the 1988 Summer Olympics, finishing fifth. In 2004, McLachlan was jailed for nine years for stock market fraud.

McLachlan died on 21 December 2020.
