= Jamie Schaffer =

Canadian rower

Personal information
- Born: 24 March 1965 (age 61) St. John's, Newfoundland and Labrador, Canada

Sport
- Sport: Rowing
Medal record
Representing Canada
Pan American Games
Silver medal – second place	1987 Indianapolis	Coxless pairs
Bronze medal – third place	1987 Indianapolis	Eight
Summer Universiade
Bronze medal – third place	1987 Zagreb	Coxed fours

Jamie Schaffer (born 24 March 1965) is a Canadian rower. He competed in the men's eight event at the 1988 Summer Olympics.
