= Jeffrey McLaughlin (rower) =

American rower

Personal information
- Born: October 31, 1965 (age 60) Summit, New Jersey, U.S.
Medal record
Men's rowing
Representing United States
Olympic Games
Silver medal – second place	1992 Barcelona	Coxless four
Bronze medal – third place	1988 Seoul	Eight
World Rowing Championships
Gold medal – first place	1987 Copenhagen	M8+
Silver medal – second place	1991 Vienna	M4-

Jeffrey Dean McLaughlin (born October 31, 1965, in Summit, New Jersey) is an American rower.

== Education ==
After rowing at (and graduating from) the Berkshire School, McLaughlin matriculated at Northeastern University, where he rowed on their varsity team. A 1989 graduate, he is a member of Northeastern's Hall of Fame.

== International competition ==
McLaughlin earned a bronze medal in the Men's 8+ at the 1988 Olympics in Seoul, a silver medal in the Men's 4- at the 1992 Olympics in Barcelona, as well as gold (1987) and silver (1991) medals at the World Rowing Championships.

== Personal life ==
McLaughlin lives in Wexford, Pennsylvania, with his wife and two daughters.
