= Yuri Dyulgerov =

Bulgarian rower

Personal information
- Nationality: Bulgarian
- Born: 8 June 1965 (age 59); Sofia, Bulgaria

Sport
- Sport: Rowing

Yuri Dyulgerov (Bulgarian: Юри Дюлгеров; born 8 June 1965) is a Bulgarian rower. He competed in the men's eight event at the 1988 Summer Olympics.
