= Im Jae-man =

South Korean rower

Personal information
- Nationality: South Korean
- Born: 10 March 1969 (age 56)

Sport
- Sport: Rowing

Im Jae-man (born 10 March 1969) is a South Korean rower. He competed in the men's eight event at the 1988 Summer Olympics.
