= Yukiyasu Ishikawa =

Japanese rower (born 1965)

Personal information
- Full name: 石川 順康 Ishikawa Yukiyasu
- Nationality: Japanese
- Born: 9 May 1965 (age 60)

Sport
- Sport: Rowing

Yukiyasu Ishikawa (born 9 May 1965) is a Japanese rowing coxswain. He competed in the men's eight event at the 1988 Summer Olympics.
