= Sally Andreae =

British rower

Personal information
- Nationality: British
- Born: 16 September 1960 (age 64); Eversley, England

Sport
- Sport: Rowing

Sally J. Andreae (born 16 September 1960) is a British former rower. She competed in the women's double sculls event at the 1988 Summer Olympics.
