= Rowing at the 2022 Asian Games – Women's coxless four =

Women's coxless four at the 2022 Asian Games
- Venue: Fuyang Water Sports Centre
- Date: 20–24 September 2023
- Competitors: 24 from 6 nations

Medalists
gold medal	China; Zhang Shuxian, Liu Xiaoxin, Wang Zifeng, Xu Xingye
silver medal	Japan; Sahoko Kinota, Akiho Takano, Haruna Sakakibara, Sayaka Chujo
bronze medal	Vietnam; Phạm Thị Huệ, Đinh Thị Hảo, Hà Thị Vui, Dư Thị Bông

The women's four competition at the 2022 Asian Games in Hangzhou, China was held on 20 & 24 September 2023 at the Fuyang Water Sports Centre.

== Schedule ==
All times are China Standard Time (UTC+08:00)

Date	Time	Event
Wednesday, 20 September 2023	10:30	Preliminary race
Sunday, 24 September 2023	10:50	Final

== Results ==
=== Preliminary race ===
- Qualification: 1–6 → Final (FA)

Rank	Team	Time	Notes
1	China (CHN); Zhang Shuxian; Liu Xiaoxin; Wang Zifeng; Xu Xingye	6:33.40	FA
2	Japan (JPN); Sahoko Kinota; Akiho Takano; Haruna Sakakibara; Sayaka Chujo	6:38.05	FA
3	Vietnam (VIE); Phạm Thị Huệ; Đinh Thị Hảo; Hà Thị Vui; Dư Thị Bông	6:39.89	FA
4	Hong Kong (HKG); Wong Lok Yiu; Hui Wing Ki; Cheung Hoi Lam; Leung King Wan	6:54.33	FA
5	Thailand (THA); Jirakon Phuetthonglang; Nattariwan Nunchai; Piyamon Toemsuk; Jirakit Phuetthonglang	7:02.38	FA
6	India (IND); Aswathi P. B. Mrunmayee Salgaonkar; Thangjam Priya Devi; Rukmani	7:09.07	FA

=== Final ===
Rank	Team	Time
1st place, gold medalist(s)	China (CHN); Zhang Shuxian; Liu Xiaoxin; Wang Zifeng; Xu Xingye	6:42.03
2nd place, silver medalist(s)	Japan (JPN); Sahoko Kinota; Akiho Takano; Haruna Sakakibara; Sayaka Chujo	6:47.04
3rd place, bronze medalist(s)	Vietnam (VIE); Phạm Thị Huệ; Đinh Thị Hảo; Hà Thị Vui; Dư Thị Bông	6:52.35
4	Hong Kong (HKG); Wong Lok Yiu; Hui Wing Ki; Cheung Hoi Lam; Leung King Wan	7:04.85
5	India (IND); Aswathi P. B. Mrunmayee Salgaonkar; Thangjam Priya Devi; Rukmani	7:12.40
6	Thailand (THA); Jirakon Phuetthonglang; Nattariwan Nunchai; Piyamon Toemsuk; Jirakit Phuetthonglang	7:16.89
