= Dimitar Tonchev =

Bulgarian rower

Personal information
- Nationality: Bulgarian
- Born: 7 October 1970 (age 54); Sofia, Bulgaria

Sport
- Sport: Rowing

Dimitar Tonchev (Bulgarian: Димитър Тончев, born 7 October 1970) is a Bulgarian rower. He competed in the men's eight event at the 1988 Summer Olympics.
