= Seiji Chihara =

Japanese rower (born 1963)

Personal information
- Full name: 千原 誠治 Chihara Seiji
- Nationality: Japanese
- Born: 14 April 1963 (age 62)

Sport
- Sport: Rowing

Seiji Chihara (born 14 April 1963) is a Japanese rower. He competed in the men's eight event at the 1988 Summer Olympics.
