= Chung Kwang-soo =

South Korean rower

Personal information
- Nationality: South Korean
- Born: 12 July 1968 (age 56)

Sport
- Sport: Rowing

Chung Kwang-soo (born 12 July 1968) is a South Korean rower. He competed in the men's eight event at the 1988 Summer Olympics.
