= Rowing at the 1988 Summer Olympics – Women's double sculls =

Women's double sculls at the Games of the XXIV Olympiad
- Date: 19–24 September 1988
- Competitors: 21 from 10 nations

Medalists
| 1st place, gold medalist(s) | | Birgit Peter; Martina Schröter | East Germany |
| 2nd place, silver medalist(s) | | Elisabeta Lipă; Veronica Cogeanu | Romania |
| 3rd place, bronze medalist(s) | | Violeta Ninova; Stefka Madina | Bulgaria |

The women's double sculls competition at the 1988 Summer Olympics took place at took place at Han River Regatta Course, South Korea.

== Competition format ==
The competition consisted of two main rounds (heats and finals) as well as a repechage. The 10 boats were divided into two heats for the first round, with 5 boats in each heat. The winner of each heat (2 boats total) advanced directly to the "A" final (for 1st through 6th place). The remaining 8 boats were placed in the repechage. The repechage featured two heats, with 4 boats in each heat. The top two boats in each repechage heat (4 boats total) advanced to the "A" final. The remaining 4 boats (3rd and 4th placers in the repechage heats) were eliminated from medal contention and competed in the "B" final for 7th through 10th place.

All races were over a 2000 metre course, unlike previous Games in which women used a 1000 metre course.

== Results ==
=== Heats ===
==== Heat 1 ====
| Rank | Rowers | Nation | Time | Notes |
|---|---|---|---|---|
| 1 | Liliana Geneș; Elisabeta Lipă | Romania | 7:30.09 | QA |
| 2 | Mariya Omelianovych; Marina Zhukova | Soviet Union | 7:35.82 | R |
| 3 | Maria Brandin; Carina Gustavsson | Sweden | 7:38.14 | R |
| 4 | Monica Havelka; Cathy Thaxton-Tippett | United States | 7:38.62 | R |
| 5 | Silken Laumann; Kay Worthington | Canada | 7:46.89 | R |

==== Heat 2 ====
| Rank | Rowers | Nation | Time | Notes |
|---|---|---|---|---|
| 1 | Birgit Peter; Martina Schröter | East Germany | 7:25.95 | QA |
| 2 | Stefka Madina; Violeta Ninova | Bulgaria | 7:32.82 | R |
| 3 | Cao Mianying; Guo Mei | China | 7:39.20 | R |
| 4 | Sally Andreae; Alison Gill | Great Britain | 8:01.34 | R |
| 5 | Han Hye-sun; Jang Myeong-hui | South Korea | 8:16.55 | R |

=== Repechage ===
==== Repechage heat 1 ====
| Rank | Rowers | Nation | Time | Notes |
|---|---|---|---|---|
| 1 | Mariya Omelianovych; Marina Zhukova | Soviet Union | 7:30.00 | QA |
| 2 | Cao Mianying; Guo Mei | China | 7:32.39 | QA |
| 3 | Silken Laumann; Kay Worthington | Canada | 7:36.80 | QB |
| 4 | Sally Andreae; Alison Gill | Great Britain | 7:59.75 | QB |

==== Repechage heat 2 ====
| Rank | Rowers | Nation | Time | Notes |
|---|---|---|---|---|
| 1 | Stefka Madina; Violeta Ninova | Bulgaria | 7:24.96 | QA |
| 2 | Monica Havelka; Cathy Thaxton-Tippett | United States | 7:29.52 | QA |
| 3 | Maria Brandin; Carina Gustavsson | Sweden | 7:30.23 | QB |
| 4 | Han Hye-sun; Jang Myeong-hui | South Korea | 8:13.57 | QB |

=== Finals ===
==== Final B ====
| Rank | Rowers | Nation | Time |
|---|---|---|---|
| 7 | Silken Laumann; Kay Worthington | Canada | 8:03.56 |
| 8 | Maria Brandin; Carina Gustavsson | Sweden | 8:09.35 |
| 9 | Sally Andreae; Alison Gill | Great Britain | 8:15.70 |
| 10 | Han Hye-sun; Jang Myeong-hui | South Korea | 8:58.45 |

==== Final A ====
| Rank | Rowers | Nation | Time |
|---|---|---|---|
| 1st place, gold medalist(s) | Birgit Peter; Martina Schröter | East Germany | 7:00.48 |
| 2nd place, silver medalist(s) | Veronica Cochela; Elisabeta Lipă | Romania | 7:04.36 |
| 3rd place, bronze medalist(s) | Stefka Madina; Violeta Ninova | Bulgaria | 7:06.03 |
| 4 | Mariya Omelianovych; Marina Zhukova | Soviet Union | 7:12.67 |
| 5 | Cao Mianying; Guo Mei | China | 7:18.69 |
| 6 | Monica Havelka; Cathy Thaxton-Tippett | United States | 7:21.28 |

== Final classification ==
| Rank | Rowers | Nation |
|---|---|---|
| 1st place, gold medalist(s) | Birgit Peter; Martina Schröter | East Germany |
| 2nd place, silver medalist(s) | Elisabeta Lipă; Veronica Cogeanu; Liliana Geneș | Romania |
| 3rd place, bronze medalist(s) | Violeta Ninova; Stefka Madina | Bulgaria |
| 4 | Marina Zhukova; Mariya Omelianovych | Soviet Union |
| 5 | Guo Mei; Cao Mianying | China |
| 6 | Monica Havelka; Cathy Thaxton-Tippett | United States |
| 7 | Silken Laumann; Kay Worthington | Canada |
| 8 | Maria Brandin; Carina Gustavsson | Sweden |
| 9 | Sally Andreae; Alison Gill | Great Britain |
| 10 | Jang Myeong-hui; Han Hye-sun | South Korea |
