= Giuseppe Di Palo =

Italian rower

Personal information
- Nationality: Italian
- Born: 12 March 1968 (age 58) Naples, Italy

Sport
- Sport: Rowing
Medal record
Representing Italy
World Rowing Championships
Bronze medal – third place	1987 Copenhagen	Eight
Summer Universiade
Gold medal – first place	1987 Zagreb	Eight

Giuseppe Di Palo (born 12 March 1968) is an Italian rower. He competed in the men's eight event at the 1988 Summer Olympics.
