= Simon Jefferies =

British coxswain (born 1955)

Personal information
- Born: 11 July 1955 (age 70) Nottingham, Great Britain
- Height: 170 cm (5 ft 7 in)
- Weight: 50 kg (110 lb)

Sport
- Sport: Rowing
- Club: Leander Club, Henley-on-Thames
Medal record
Men's rowing
Representing Great Britain
World Rowing Championships
Gold medal – first place	1980 Hazewinkel	Lwt eight

Simon H. Jefferies (born 11 July 1955) is a British coxswain. He won a gold medal at the 1980 World Rowing Championships in Hazewinkel with the lightweight men's eight. He was the cox for the British men's eight at the 1988 Summer Olympics where they came fourth. He was part of the British eight at the 1975 World Rowing Championships in Nottingham, the crew finished 9th overall after a third-place finish in the B final.
