= Kim Gap-sik =

South Korean rower

Personal information
- Nationality: South Korean
- Born: 26 January 1968 (age 57)

Sport
- Sport: Rowing

Kim Gap-sik (born 26 January 1968) is a South Korean rower. He competed in the men's eight event at the 1988 Summer Olympics.
