= Rumen Aleksiev =

Bulgarian rower

Personal information
- Nationality: Bulgarian
- Born: 12 May 1967 (age 57); Sofia, Bulgaria

Sport
- Sport: Rowing

Rumen Aleksiev (Bulgarian: Румен Алексиев, born 12 May 1967) is a Bulgarian rower. He competed in the men's eight event at the 1988 Summer Olympics.
