= Dimitar Kamburski =

Bulgarian rower (born 1966)

Personal information
- Nationality: Bulgarian
- Born: 28 January 1966 (age 59); Plovdiv, Bulgaria

Sport
- Sport: Rowing

Dimitar Kamburski (Bulgarian: Димитър Камбурски, born 28 January 1966) is a Bulgarian rower. He competed in the men's eight event at the 1988 Summer Olympics.
