= Rowing at the 2022 Asian Games – Women's eight =

Women's eight at the 2022 Asian Games
- Venue: Fuyang Water Sports Centre
- Date: 20–25 September 2023
- Competitors: 45 from 5 nations

Medalists
gold medal	China; Zhang Shuxian, Yu Siyuan, Bao Lijun, Dong Xiya, Zhang Hairong, Liu Xiaoxin, Wang Zifeng, Xu Xingye, Xu Xiaohan
silver medal	Japan; Emi Hirouchi, Urara Kakishima, Chiaki Tomita, Akiho Takano, Haruna Sakakibara, Sahoko Kinota, Shiho Yonekawa, Sayaka Chujo, Saki Senda
bronze medal	Vietnam; Hồ Thị Lý, Trần Thị Kiệt, Phạm Thị Ngọc Anh, Lê Thị Hiền, Hà Thị Vui, Đinh Thị Hảo, Phạm Thị Huệ, Dư Thị Bông, Nguyễn Lâm Kiều Diễm

The women's eight competition at the 2022 Asian Games in Hangzhou, China was held at 20 & 25 September 2023 at the Fuyang Water Sports Centre.

== Schedule ==
All times are China Standard Time (UTC+08:00)

Date	Time	Event
Wednesday, 20 September 2023	17:00	Preliminary race
Monday, 25 September 2023	11:20	Final

== Results ==
=== Preliminary race ===
- Qualification: 1–5 → Final (FA)

Rank	Team	Time	Notes
1	China (CHN); Zhang Shuxian; Yu Siyuan; Bao Lijun; Dong Xiya; Zhang Hairong; Liu Xiaoxin; Wang Zifeng; Xu Xingye; Xu Xiaohan	6:24.98	FA
2	Vietnam (VIE); Hồ Thị Lý; Trần Thị Kiệt; Phạm Thị Ngọc Anh; Lê Thị Hiền; Hà Thị Vui; Đinh Thị Hảo; Phạm Thị Huệ; Dư Thị Bông; Nguyễn Lâm Kiều Diễm	6:33.28	FA
3	Japan (JPN); Sayaka Chujo; Chiaki Tomita; Urara Kakishima; Emi Hirouchi; Akiho Takano; Sahoko Kinota; Shiho Yonekawa; Haruna Sakakibara; Saki Senda	6:36.42	FA
4	India (IND); Sonali Swain; Ritu Kaudi; Thangjam Priya Devi; Varsha K. B. Aswathi P. B. Mrunmayee Salgaonkar; Haobijam Tendenthoi Devi; Rukmani; Geetanjali Gurugubelli	6:41.37	FA
5	Thailand (THA); Nattariwan Nunchai; Jirakon Phuetthonglang; Jirakit Phuetthonglang; Matinee Raruen; Rawiwan Sukkaew; Piyamon Toemsuk; Nuntida Krajangjam; Parisa Chaempudsa; Phumiphat Hangkasee	7:05.52	FA

=== Final ===
Rank	Team	Time
1st place, gold medalist(s)	China (CHN); Zhang Shuxian; Yu Siyuan; Bao Lijun; Dong Xiya; Zhang Hairong; Liu Xiaoxin; Wang Zifeng; Xu Xingye; Xu Xiaohan	6:33.61
2nd place, silver medalist(s)	Japan (JPN); Emi Hirouchi; Urara Kakishima; Chiaki Tomita; Akiho Takano; Haruna Sakakibara; Sahoko Kinota; Shiho Yonekawa; Sayaka Chujo; Saki Senda	6:44.15
3rd place, bronze medalist(s)	Vietnam (VIE); Hồ Thị Lý; Trần Thị Kiệt; Phạm Thị Ngọc Anh; Lê Thị Hiền; Hà Thị Vui; Đinh Thị Hảo; Phạm Thị Huệ; Dư Thị Bông; Nguyễn Lâm Kiều Diễm	6:48.21
4	Thailand (THA); Nattariwan Nunchai; Jirakon Phuetthonglang; Jirakit Phuetthonglang; Matinee Raruen; Rawiwan Sukkaew; Piyamon Toemsuk; Nuntida Krajangjam; Parisa Chaempudsa; Phumiphat Hangkasee	6:49.85
5	India (IND); Sonali Swain; Ritu Kaudi; Thangjam Priya Devi; Varsha K. B. Aswathi P. B. Mrunmayee Salgaonkar; Haobijam Tendenthoi Devi; Rukmani; Geetanjali Gurugubelli	7:05.71
