= Jason Dorland =

Canadian rower

Personal information
- Born: 26 August 1964 (age 62) St. Catharines, Ontario, Canada

Sport
- Sport: Rowing
Medal record
Representing United States
Summer Universiade
Bronze medal – third place	1993 Buffalo	Lwt single sculls

Jason Dorland (born 26 August 1964) is a Canadian rower. He competed in the men's eight event at the 1988 Summer Olympics.

He studied advertising design at Syracuse University, in Syracuse, New York, but transferred to the University of Victoria in British Columbia to train with the Canadian national rowing team. He was later a rowing coach, returning to Shawnigan Lake School in 1990.

Dorland is the author of two books: Chariots and Horses: Life Lessons from an Olympic Rower (2011), Pulling Together: A Coach's Journey to Uncover the Mindset of True Potential (2017), and Ike: the dog who saved a human (2022).
