= Vasily Tikhonov (rower) =

Soviet rower

Personal information
- Born: Vasily Pavlovich Tikhonov; 19 November 1960 (age 65)
- Height: 194 cm (6 ft 4 in)
- Weight: 96 kg (212 lb)
- Spouse: Irina Kalimbet

Sport
- Sport: Rowing
Medal record
Men's rowing
Representing the Soviet Union
Olympic Games
Silver medal – second place	1988 Seoul	Eight

Vasily Pavlovich Tikhonov (Russian: Василий Тихонов; born 19 November 1960) is a Soviet rower. He is married to Irina Kalimbet who like him competed at the 1988 Summer Olympics in rowing. Their twin daughters Anastasia and Elizaveta are both international rowers.
