= Piero Carletto =

Italian rower (1963–2022)

Personal information
- Nationality: Italian
- Born: 6 March 1963 Padua, Italy
- Died: 14 May 2022 (aged 59) Padua, Italy

Sport
- Sport: Rowing
Medal record
Representing Italy
World Rowing Championships
Bronze medal – third place	1987 Copenhagen	Eight
Summer Universiade
Gold medal – first place	1987 Zagreb	Eight

Piero Carletto (6 March 1963 – 14 May 2022) was an Italian rower. He competed in the men's eight event at the 1988 Summer Olympics.
