= Jang Myeong-hui =

South Korean rower

Personal information
- Nationality: South Korean
- Born: 28 February 1969 (age 56)

Sport
- Sport: Rowing

Jang Myeong-hui (born 28 February 1969) is a South Korean rower. She competed in the women's double sculls event at the 1988 Summer Olympics.
