= Ivan Stanev (rower) =

Bulgarian rower

Personal information
- Nationality: Bulgarian
- Born: 9 July 1968 (age 57) Pirgovo, Bulgaria

Sport
- Sport: Rowing

Ivan Stanev (Bulgarian: Иван Станев, born 9 July 1968) is a Bulgarian rower. He competed in the men's eight event at the 1988 Summer Olympics.
