= Monica Havelka =

American rower

Personal information
- Nationality: American
- Born: April 21, 1956 Santa Ana, California, United States
- Died: July 12, 2009 (aged 53) Redding, California, United States

Sport
- Sport: Rowing

Monica Havelka (April 21, 1956 – July 12, 2009) was an American rower. She competed in the women's double sculls event at the 1988 Summer Olympics. Prior to rowing at the Olympics, she played basketball.
