= Rowing at the 2026 Asian Games – Women's coxless pair =

Women's coxless pair at the 2026 Asian Games
- Venue: Nagaragawa International Regatta Course
- Date: 23–24 September 2026
- Competitors: 20 from 10 nations

Medalists
gold medal	Ren Wanning; Zhu Hongshan	China
silver medal	Anna Aksenova; Aydana Smetullaeva	Uzbekistan
bronze medal	Đinh Thị Hảo; Phạm Thị Huệ	Vietnam

The women's coxless pair competition at the 2026 Asian Games was held from 23 to 24 September 2026 at the Nagaragawa International Regatta Course, Gifu, Japan.

== Schedule ==
All times are Japan Standard Time (UTC+09:00)

Date	Time	Event
Wednesday, 23 September 2026	15:10	Heats
Thursday, 24 September 2026	15:50	Finals

== Results ==
=== Heats ===
- Qualification: 1–2 + next 2 fastest → Final A (FA), Rest → Final B (FB)

==== Heat 1 ====
Rank	Team	Time	Notes
1	China (CHN); Ren Wanning; Zhu Hongshan	7:42.54	FA
2	Vietnam (VIE); Đinh Thị Hảo; Phạm Thị Huệ	7:59.72	FA
3	Thailand (THA); Matinee Raruen; Natticha Kaewhom	8:10.40	FB
4	South Korea (KOR); Kim Chae-yeon; Choi Mi-seo	8:16.54	FB
5	Kazakhstan (KAZ); Tamara Pervushkina; Varvara Belonogova	8:30.80	FB

==== Heat 2 ====
Rank	Team	Time	Notes
1	Uzbekistan (UZB); Anna Aksenova; Aydana Smetullaeva	7:50.79	FA
2	Japan (JPN); Akiho Takano; Shiho Yonekawa	8:00.13	FA
3	Iran (IRI); Hanieh Khorsand; Sara Fakhri	8:05.94	FA
4	Hong Kong (HKG); Wong Sheung Yee; Leung King Wan	8:07.75	FA
5	Indonesia (INA); Issa Behuku; Chelsea Corputty	8:23.12	FB

=== Finals ===
==== Final B ====
Rank	Team	Time
1	Thailand (THA); Matinee Raruen; Natticha Kaewhom	7:32.82
2	Indonesia (INA); Issa Behuku; Chelsea Corputty	7:38.73
3	South Korea (KOR); Kim Chae-yeon; Choi Mi-seo	7:39.28
4	Kazakhstan (KAZ); Tamara Pervushkina; Varvara Belonogova	7:53.99

==== Final A ====
Rank	Team	Time
1st place, gold medalist(s)	China (CHN); Ren Wanning; Zhu Hongshan	7:06.76
2nd place, silver medalist(s)	Uzbekistan (UZB); Anna Aksenova; Aydana Smetullaeva	7:08.08
3rd place, bronze medalist(s)	Vietnam (VIE); Đinh Thị Hảo; Phạm Thị Huệ	7:13.10
4	Iran (IRI); Hanieh Khorsand; Sara Fakhri	7:17.93
5	Japan (JPN); Akiho Takano; Shiho Yonekawa	7:19.88
6	Hong Kong (HKG); Wong Sheung Yee; Leung King Wan	7:28.43
