= Go Gwang-seon =

South Korean rower

Personal information
- Nationality: South Korean
- Born: 1 May 1969 (age 55)

Sport
- Sport: Rowing

Go Gwang-seon (born 1 May 1969) is a South Korean rower. He competed in the men's eight event at the 1988 Summer Olympics.
