= Ivo Gelov =

Bulgarian rower

Personal information
- Nationality: Bulgarian
- Born: 17 June 1968 (age 56); Sofia, Bulgaria

Sport
- Sport: Rowing

Ivo Gelov (Bulgarian: Иво Гелов, born 17 June 1968) is a Bulgarian rower. He competed in the men's eight event at the 1988 Summer Olympics.
