= Emil Bondev =

Bulgarian rower

Personal information
- Nationality: Bulgarian
- Born: 19 August 1962 (age 62); Sofia, Bulgaria

Sport
- Sport: Rowing

Emil Bondev (Bulgarian: Емил Бондев, born 19 August 1962) is a Bulgarian rower. He competed in the men's eight event at the 1988 Summer Olympics.
