= Zlatanov =

Zlatanov (Bulgarian: Златанов) is a Bulgarian surname, with female form Zlatanova. Notable people with the surname include:

- Dimitar Zlatanov (born 1948), Bulgarian volleyball player
- Hristo Zlatanov (born 1976), Bulgarian volleyball player
- Jaklin Zlatanova (born 1988), Bulgarian basketball player
- Nikola Zlatanov (born 1961), Bulgarian rower
- Radoslav Zlatanov (born 1987), visually impaired Bulgarian track and field athlete
- Sisi Zlatanova, Bulgarian researcher in geospatial data
- Smilen Zlatanov (born 1992), Bulgarian footballer
- Zinaida Zlatanova, Bulgarian Minister of Justice in the Oresharski Government
