= Marina Zhukova =

Russian rower

Personal information
- Nationality: Russian
- Born: 15 October 1966 (age 58); Tver, Russian SFSR, Soviet Union

Sport
- Sport: Rowing

Marina Zhukova (born 15 October 1966) is a Russian rower. She competed in the women's double sculls event at the 1988 Summer Olympics.
