= Peter Beaumont (rower) =

British rower

Personal information
- Nationality: British
- Born: 2 January 1965 (age 60) Birmingham, England

Sport
- Sport: Rowing

Peter Beaumont (born 2 January 1965) is a British rower. He competed in the men's eight event at the 1988 Summer Olympics, and finished in fourth place. His son Jack is an Olympic silver medalist at the 2020 Olympic Games.
