= Jack Rusher =

American rower

Personal information
- Full name: John Dunbar Rusher, IV
- Born: April 18, 1967 (age 59) Boston, Massachusetts, U.S.
Medal record
Men's rowing
Representing the United States
Olympic Games
Bronze medal – third place	1988 Seoul	Eight
World Rowing Championships
Silver medal – second place	1989 Bled	Coxless four

John Dunbar Rusher (born April 18, 1967 in Boston, Massachusetts) is an American rower. He graduated from Harvard University in 1989.

== Personal life ==
Rusher is married to Cynthia Eckert; they met while on the national team. They have three children, Kay, Alison, and Nicholas Rusher. Alison and Nicholas are both Olympic rowers.
