= Ted Patton =

American rower

Personal information
- Full name: Edward Bickford Patton
- Born: February 18, 1966 (age 60) New York City, New York, U.S.
Medal record
Men's rowing
Representing United States
Olympic Games
Bronze medal – third place	1988 Seoul	Eight
World Rowing Championships
Gold medal – first place	1987 Copenhagen	M8+

Edward Bickford Patton (born February 18, 1966, in New York City) is an American rower. He graduated from Brown University in 1988, where he helped keep the crew ranked in the top three in the US.
