= Eckhardt Schultz =

West German rower

Personal information
- Born: 12 December 1964 (age 61) Wolfsburg, West Germany
- Height: 1.99 m (6 ft 6 in)
- Weight: 93 kg (205 lb)

Sport
- Sport: Rowing
- Club: RV Rauxel, Castrop-Rauxel
Medal record
Men's rowing
Representing West Germany
Olympic Games
Gold medal – first place	1988 Seoul	Eight

Eckhardt Schultz (born 12 December 1964) is a retired competition rower from West Germany who won a gold medal in the men's eight at the 1988 Summer Olympics.
