= Ettore Bulgarelli =

Italian rower

Personal information
- Nationality: Italian
- Born: 20 April 1965 (age 59)

Sport
- Sport: Rowing

Ettore Bulgarelli (born 20 April 1965) is an Italian rower. He competed in the men's eight event at the 1988 Summer Olympics.
