= Doug Burden =

American rower

Personal information
- Full name: William Douglas Burden
- Born: July 29, 1965 (age 61) Rutland, Vermont, U.S.
Medal record
Men's rowing
Representing United States
Olympic Games
Silver medal – second place	1992 Barcelona	Coxless four
Bronze medal – third place	1988 Seoul	Eight
World Rowing Championships
Gold medal – first place	1987 Copenhagen	M8+
Bronze medal – third place	1986 Nottingham	M4+

William Douglas Burden (born July 29, 1965) is an American rower and descendant of the Vanderbilt family through his great great grandmother Emily Thorn Vanderbilt.

== See also ==
- List of Princeton University Olympians
