= Ivan Omelianovych-Pavlenko =

Ukrainian general (1881–1962)

- Іван Омелянович-Павленко
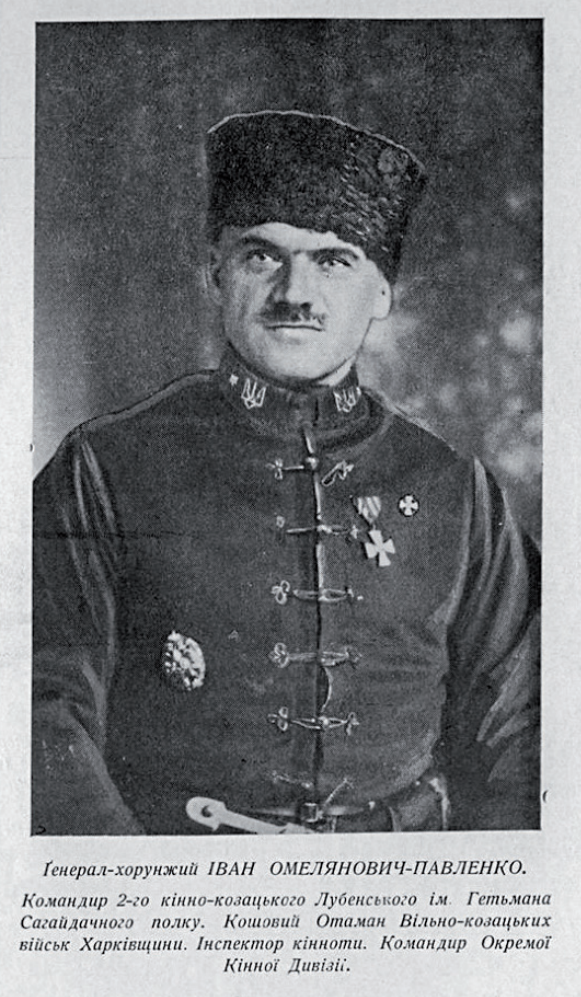
- Omelianovych-Pavlenko in 1921
- Born: August 31, 1881; Baku, Russian Empire (now Azerbaijan)
- Died: September 8, 1962 (aged 81); Chicago, Illinois, U.S.
- Relatives: Mykhailo Omelianovych-Pavlenko (brother)
- Military career
- Allegiance: Russian Empire; Ukrainian People's Republic; Ukrainian State; West Ukrainian People's Republic; Nazi Germany
- Service years: 1901–1921; 1941–1945
- Rank: Colonel general
- Conflicts: Russo-Japanese War; World War I; Ukrainian War of Independence; Polish–Ukrainian War; Battle of Lemberg (1918); World War II; German occupation of Byelorussia

Ivan Volodymyrovych Omelianovych-Pavlenko (Note: Ukrainian: Іван Володимирович Омелянович-Павленко, romanized: Ivan Volodymyrovych Omelianovych-Pavlenko) (August 31, 1881 – September 8, 1962) was a colonel general in the army of the Ukrainian People's Republic.

== Early life and career ==
Ivan Pavlenko was born on 31 August 1881 in the city of Baku, then in the Caucasus Viceroyalty within the Russian Empire. His father was a Bessarabian noble of Georgian descent and a lieutenant general in the Imperial Russian Army. His brother was Mykhailo Omelianovych-Pavlenko, who would himself pursue a military career. On 26 August 1912, his family's surname was changed from Pavlenko to Omelianovych-Pavlenko.

In 1901, Pavlenko joined the Imperial Russian Army as an officer. He was a graduate of the Omsk Cadet Corps, the Yelisavetgrad Equestrial School, and the General Staff Academy, and served in both the Russo-Japanese War and the First World War. From 1917, he commanded the 8th Lubny Hussars' Regiment.

== Ukrainian War of Independence ==
After the declaration of independence of the Ukrainian People's Republic, Omelianovych-Pavlenko followed suit by transferring the 8th Hussar Regiment to the newly-independent Ukrainian People's Army as the 22nd Hetman Sahaidachny Regiment. After the 1918 Ukrainian coup d'état, he was also placed in charge of the Kharkiv Cossack Regiment.

In December 1918, the Pavlenko brothers travelled to the West Ukrainian People's Republic, where they participated in the Battle of Lemberg. Serving until February 1919 in West Ukraine, he returned to Ukraine proper and continued to rise through the ranks, being promoted to colonel general in October 1920.

== World War II ==
After the Ukrainian People's Republic was defeated, Omelianovych-Pavlenko lived in a refugee camp in the Polish city of Kalisz. In 1923, he would move to Prague.

In 1941, Omelianovych-Pavlenko joined the Schutzmannschaft as commander of the 109th Police Battalion. In this capacity, he led the police force of both Bila Tserkva and Vinnytsia. He also fought Soviet partisans on behalf of German forces. Following the war, he emigrated to the United States, where he died in Chicago. He was buried in South Bound Brook, New Jersey.
