= Pavlo Hurkovskiy =

Soviet rower

Medal record

Men's rowing

Representing the Soviet Union

Olympic Games
Silver medal – second place	1988 Seoul	Eight

Friendship Games
Gold medal – first place	1984 Moscow	Eight

World Rowing Championships
Gold medal – first place	1985 Hazewinkel	Eight
Silver medal – second place	1986 Nottingham	Eight

Pavlo Mykolaiovych Hurkovskiy (Ukrainian: Павло Миколайович Гурковський, Russian: Павел Николаевич Гурковский; born 13 September 1960, in Kherson) is a Ukrainian rower who competed for the Soviet Union in the 1988 Summer Olympics.
