= Stephen Turner (rower) =

British rower (born 1964)

Personal information
- Nationality: British
- Born: 17 September 1964 (age 60); Barnstaple, England

Sport
- Sport: Rowing

Stephen Turner (born 17 September 1964) is a British rower. He competed at the 1988 Summer Olympics and the 1992 Summer Olympics.
