= Liu Xiaoxin =

Chinese rower

Personal information
- Nationality: China
- Born: 24 July 1997 (age 28)

Sport
- Sport: Rowing
Medal record
Asian Games
Gold medal – first place	2022 Hangzhou	Coxless four
Gold medal – first place	2022 Hangzhou	Eight
World University Games
Gold medal – first place	2021 Chengdu	Coxless four

Liu Xiaoxin (born 24 July 1997) is a Chinese rower. She competed in the 2020 Summer Olympics.
