= Aleksandr Dumchev =

Soviet Olympic rower

Medal record

Men's rowing

Representing the Soviet Union

Olympic Games
Silver medal – second place	1988 Seoul	Eight

Aleksandr Yuryevich Dumchev (Russian: Александр Юрьевич Думчев; born 27 October 1961) is a Soviet rower. At the 1988 Summer Olympics, he won a silver medal in the eight.
