= Seth Bauer =

American rowing cox (born 1959)

Personal information
- Full name: Seth David Bauer
- Born: September 25, 1959 (age 66) Bridgeport, Connecticut, U.S.
Medal record
Men's rowing
Representing the United States
Olympic Games
Bronze medal – third place	1988 Seoul	Eight
World Championships
Gold medal – first place	1987 Copenhagen	M8+
Bronze medal – third place	1981 Munich	M8+

Seth David Bauer (born September 25, 1959 in Bridgeport, Connecticut) is an American rowing cox. He is Jewish. In 1988, he won a bronze medal at the Olympic Games, and he won a bronze at the 1981 World Championships and a gold at the 1987 World Championships.
