= Veniamin But =

Soviet rower

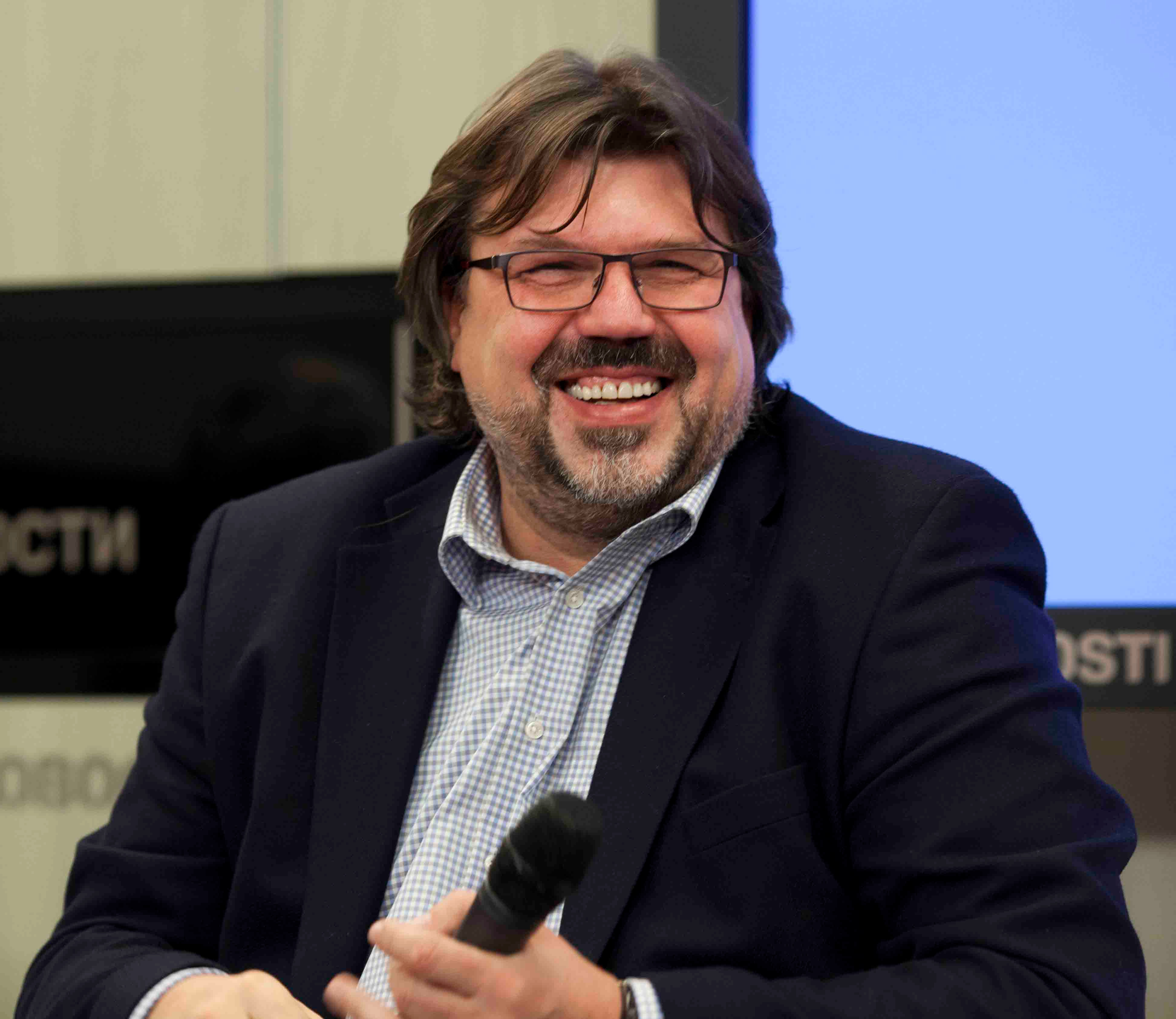
- But in 2013

Personal information
- Full name: Veniamin Yevgenyevich But
- Born: 1 August 1961 (age 64) Leningrad, Russian SFSR, Soviet Union
- Height: 1.91 m (6 ft 3 in)
- Weight: 95 kg (209 lb)

Sport
- Sport: Rowing
- Club: Dynamo St. Petersburg
Medal record
Men's rowing
Representing the Soviet Union
Olympic Games
Silver medal – second place	1988 Seoul	Eight
Friendship Games
Gold medal – first place	1984 Moscow	Eight
World Rowing Championships
Gold medal – first place	1985 Hazewinkel	Eight
Silver medal – second place	1986 Nottingham	Eight
Silver medal – second place	1987 Copenhagen	Coxless four

Veniamin Yevgenyevich But (Russian: Вениамин Евгеньевич Бут; born 1 August 1961) President of Russian rowing Federation (November 2012 – November 2016) is a retired Soviet rower. Competing for the Soviet Union in the men's eight, he won a world title in 1985 and an Olympic silver medal at the 1988 Summer Olympics.
