= Nikola Zlatanov =

Bulgarian rower

Personal information
- Nationality: Bulgarian/French
- Born: 3 September 1961 (age 65) Sofia, Bulgaria

Sport
- Sport: Rowing

Nikola Zlatanov (Bulgarian: Никола Златанов; born 3 September 1961) is a Bulgarian rower. He competed in the men's eight event at the 1988 Summer Olympics.

He moved to France, and now he is a trainer and responsible the "Pôle Espoir des Hauts de France".
