= Mykola Komarov =

Soviet rower

Medal record

Men's rowing

Representing the Soviet Union

Olympic Games
| Silver medal – second place | 1988 Seoul | Eight |

Friendship Games
| Gold medal – first place | 1984 Moscow | Eight |

World Rowing Championships
| Gold medal – first place | 1985 Hazewinkel | Eight |
| Silver medal – second place | 1986 Nottingham | Eight |
| Silver medal – second place | 1987 Copenhagen | Coxed four |

Mykola Anatoliyovych Komarov (Ukrainian: Микола Анатолійович Комаров; born 23 August 1961 in Zaporizhia) is a Ukrainian rower who competed for the Soviet Union in the 1988 Summer Olympics.

At the 1986 World Rowing Championships in Nottingham, he won a silver medal with the eight.
