= Martina Schröter =

East German rower

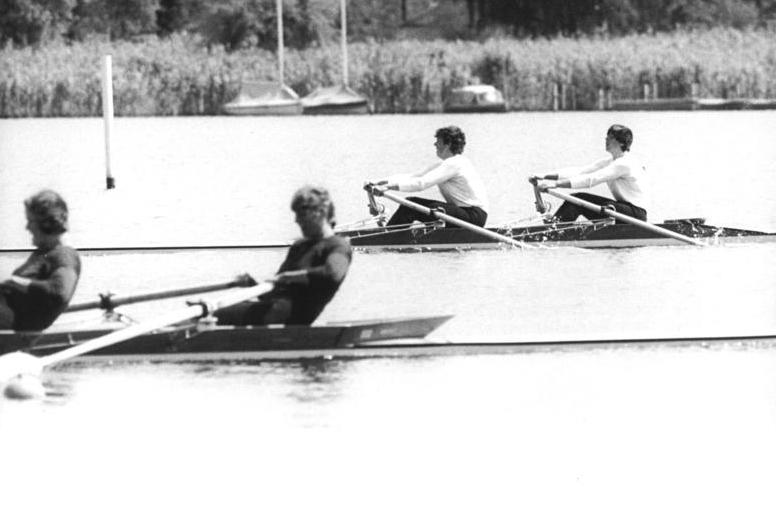
- Schröter (second from right) winning the 1985 East German championships in double scull with Sylvia Schwabe, defeating Birgit Peter and Ramona Balthasar

Personal information
- Born: 16 November 1960 (age 65)

Sport
- Sport: Rowing
Medal record
Women's rowing
Representing East Germany
Olympic Games
Bronze medal – third place	1980 Moscow	Single sculls
Gold medal – first place	1988 Seoul	Double sculls
World Rowing Championships
Gold medal – first place	1983 Duisburg	Double sculls
Gold medal – first place	1985 Hazewinkel	Double sculls
Silver medal – second place	1979 Bled	Single scull
Silver medal – second place	1982 Lucerne	Double sculls
Silver medal – second place	1987 Copenhagen	Single scull

Martina Schröter (born 16 November 1960) is a German rower, who competed for the SG Dynamo Potsdam / Sportvereinigung (SV) Dynamo. She won the medals at the international rowing competitions. In October 1986, she was awarded a Patriotic Order of Merit in gold (first class) for her sporting success. The Olympic gold medal that she won in 1988 in the double sculls teamed up with Birgit Peter was the 500th Olympic medal won by East Germany.
