= Nicholas Burfitt =

British rower

Personal information
- Nationality: British
- Born: 17 December 1966 (age 58); Keynsham, England

Sport
- Sport: Rowing

Nicholas Burfitt (born 17 December 1966) is a British rower. He competed at the 1988 Summer Olympics and the 1992 Summer Olympics.
