= Ha Jin-sik =

South Korean rower (born 1967)

Personal information
- Nationality: South Korean
- Born: 4 September 1967 (age 57)

Sport
- Sport: Rowing

Ha Jin-sik (born 4 September 1967) is a South Korean rower. He competed in the men's eight event at the 1988 Summer Olympics.
