= Anton Obholzer =

British rower

Personal information
- Nationality: British
- Born: 29 June 1968 (age 58) Cape Town, South Africa
- Relative: Rupert Obholzer (brother)

Sport
- Sport: Rowing
- Club: London University Rowing Club
Medal record
Representing Great Britain
Summer Universiade
Bronze medal – third place	1989 Duisburg	Single sculls

Anton Manfred Obholzer (born 29 June 1968) is a British rower. He competed in the men's eight event at the 1988 Summer Olympics.
