= Wolfgang Maennig =

West German economics professor and retired rower

Personal information
- Born: 12 February 1960 (age 66) Berlin, Germany
- Height: 2.04 m (6 ft 8 in)
- Weight: 97 kg (214 lb)

Sport
- Sport: Rowing
- Club: Rudernverein Blankenstein
Medal record
Men's rowing
Representing West Germany
Olympic Games
Gold medal – first place	1988 Seoul	Eight

Wolfgang Maennig (born 12 February 1960) is an economics professor and a retired competition rower from West Germany. He competed in the men's eight at the 1984 and 1988 Olympics and finished in sixth and first place, respectively.

Currently Maennig is professor of economics at the Hamburg University. Before that he was professor at E.A.P. Paris-Oxford-Berlin-Madrid, American University in Dubai, Federal University of Rio, University Stellenbosch, and University of Economics Bratislava. He was also visiting scholar at the International Monetary Fund in Washington and at the Deutsche Bundesbank.

His research concentrates on regional economics, sport economics, and real estate economics and has been published in academic journals. He was part of evaluation committees for several bids of large sport events, including the Olympic bids of Berlin 2000, Leipzig 2012, Munich 2018 and the Athletics World Cup Berlin 2009.
