= Viktor Diduk =

Soviet rower

Medal record

Men's rowing

Representing the Soviet Union

Olympic Games
Silver medal – second place	1988 Seoul	Eight

Friendship Games
Gold medal – first place	1984 Moscow	Eight

World Rowing Championships
Gold medal – first place	1985 Hazewinkel	Eight
Silver medal – second place	1986 Nottingham	Eight
Bronze medal – third place	1982 Lucerne	Eight

Viktor Ivanovich Diduk (Russian: Виктор Иванович Дидук; born 8 July 1957) is a Soviet rower. At the 1988 Summer Olympics, he won a silver medal in the eight.
