= Haruna Sakakibara =

Japanese rower (born 1994)

Personal information
- Nationality: Japan
- Born: 20 August 1993 (age 32)

Sport
- Sport: Rowing
Medal record
Women's rowing
Representing Japan
Asian Games
Silver medal – second place	2022 Hangzhou	Coxless four
Silver medal – second place	2022 Hangzhou	Eight

Haruna Sakakibara (榊原春奈, Sakakibara Haruna) (born 11 March 1994) is a Japanese rower. She competed in the single sculls race at the 2012 Summer Olympics and placed 5th in Final D and 23rd overall.
