= Peter Nordell =

American rower

Personal information
- Born: August 30, 1966 (age 59) DuPage County, Illinois, U.S.
Medal record
Men's rowing
Representing United States
Olympic Games
Bronze medal – third place	1988 Seoul	Eight
World Rowing Championships
Gold medal – first place	1987 Copenhagen	M8+

Peter W. Nordell (born August 30, 1966 in DuPage County, Illinois) is an American rower.
