= Stefka Madina =

Bulgarian rower (born 1963)

Personal information
- Born: 23 January 1963 (age 63) Plovdiv, Bulgaria

Sport
- Sport: Rowing
Medal record
Representing Bulgaria
Olympic Games
Bronze medal – third place	1988 Seoul	Double sculls
World Rowing Championships
Gold medal – first place	1987 Copenhagen	Double sculls
Bronze medal – third place	1983 Duisburg	Coxed quad sculls
Summer Universiade
Silver medal – second place	1987 Zagreb	Quadruple sculls

Stefka Mikhaylova Madina (Bulgarian: Стефка Михайлова Мадина; born 23 January 1963) is a Bulgarian rower. She was a bronze medal with her partner Violeta Ninova in Double sculls at the 1988 Seoul Olympic Games. Madina was born in Plovdiv.
