= Đinh Thị Hảo =

Vietnamese rower (born 1997)

Personal information
- Nationality: Vietnamese
- Born: 15 November 1997 (age 28) Yên Sơn, Tuyên Quang, Vietnam

Sport
- Sport: Rowing
Medal record
Women's rowing
Representing Vietnam
Asian Games
Silver medal – second place	2018 Jakarta–Palembang	Four
Bronze medal – third place	2022 Hangzhou	Four
Bronze medal – third place	2022 Hangzhou	Eight
Bronze medal – third place	2026 Aichi–Nagoya	Pair

Đinh Thị Hảo (born 15 November 1997) is a Vietnamese rower. She competed in the women's lightweight double sculls event at the 2020 Summer Olympics. Partnered with Lường Thị Thảothey achieved finished in the Final C of their event, marking the best result for a Vietnamese rowing team in Olympic history.
