= Shunsuke Miyake =

Japanese physician

- Born: 1854; Tsuwano, Shimane Prefecture, Japan
- Died: 1926 (aged 71–72)
- Occupation: Physician
- Known for: Working for Kaishun Byoin, the leper hospital of Hannah Riddell for 30 years.

Shunsuke Miyake (三宅 俊輔, Miyake Shunsuke; November 29, 1854 – 1926) was a Japanese Christian physician who helped Hannah Riddell at Kaishun Hospital, an important Hansen's disease hospital in Japan in prewar days. The medical care and administration were maintained by his devotion for 30 years (1897-1926).

== Life ==
He was born in 1854 in Tsuwano, Shimane Prefecture and went up to Tokyo. He was qualified as a doctor and went into private practice in Tsuwano, and then Yamaguchi. He was baptized in 1881. He worked in Nagasaki and Taniyama, Kagoshima Prefecture. In 1897, he was asked to work at the Kaishun Hospital, Kumamoto's first leprosy hospital. He lived in the hospital, and was loved by patients. In 1921, he was awarded a prize for unselfish services by the Interior Ministry of Japan.

- Kaishun Hospital was famous for Hannah Riddell, but this was because the hospital had been cared for by a devoted person like Miyake.
- Described by one patient as looking like an undistinguished village schoolmaster, he had a gentle appearance that was in marked contrast to that of the officials of the state leprosaria, many of whom were former policemen and tended to treat their parents imperiously, as if they were criminals. Most nights, Miyake was called from his bed but he never complained. He did the housework for his sick wife, and his modesty and simple dress often caused visitors to mistake him for a servant. Miyake served as a buffer between Hannah Riddell and patients and often sorted out problems when there was a breach of the rules.
