= Mariya Omelianovych =

Ukrainian rower (born 1960)

Personal information
- Born: 21 September 1960 (age 65) Chernivtsi, Ukrainian SSR, Soviet Union
- Height: 189 cm (6 ft 2 in)
- Weight: 80 kg (176 lb)
- Spouse: Viktor Omelyanovich

Sport
- Sport: Rowing
Medal record
Women's rowing
Representing the Soviet Union
World Rowing Championships
Silver medal – second place	1989 Bled	Quad scull
Silver medal – second place	1990 Tasmania	Quad scull
Silver medal – second place	1991 Vienna	Quad scull

Mariya Omelianovych (née Danilyuk, born 21 September 1960) is a Ukrainian rower who represented the Soviet Union.

== Career ==
She had qualified for the 1984 Summer Olympics but did not go due to the boycott led by the Soviet Union. Instead, she competed at the Friendship Games, also dubbed the "alternative Olympics", and won first place in single scull. At the 1985 World Rowing Championships in Hazewinkel, Belgium, she came sixth in the single scull event.

She competed at the 1988 Summer Olympics in Seoul with the women's double sculls where they came fourth. At the 1989 World Rowing Championships in Bled, she won silver with the quad scull. In the same boat class but with different team compositions, she won two further silver medals in 1990 and 1991.
