= John Pescatore =

American rower

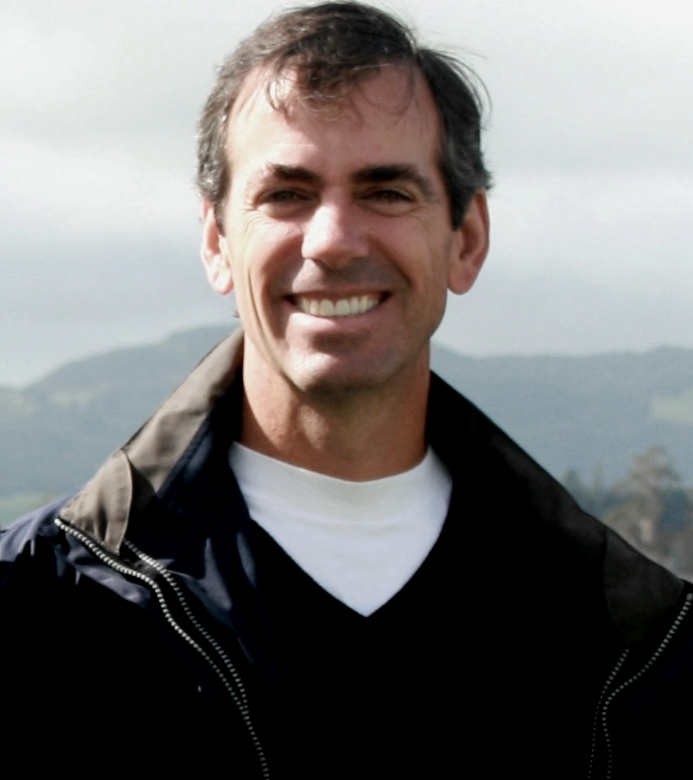

Personal information
- Full name: John Anthony Pescatore
- Born: February 2, 1964 (age 62) Cocoa Beach, Florida, U.S.
Medal record
Men's rowing
Representing the United States
Olympic Games
Bronze medal – third place	1988 Seoul	Eight
World Championships
Gold medal – first place	1987 Copenhagen	Eight

John Anthony Pescatore (born February 2, 1964) is an American rower and rowing coach. He competed in the 1988 Seoul Olympic Games for the United States as stroke of the men's eight which placed third. He later competed at the 1992 Barcelona Olympic Games in the men's coxless pair. Then in 2000 he was placed top coach in America for coaching the coxless pair to silver at the 2000 Sydney Olympic Games. Pescatore was also in the 1987 eight that won the world championships in Copenhagen, Denmark.

Pescatore graduated in 1986 from the University of Pennsylvania where, as captain, he stroked the men's varsity eight to victory at the Eastern Sprints. He was the head coach of rowing at Yale University from 2002 to 2010.

== See also ==
- College Boat Club
