= Nam Sang-lan =

South Korean rower (born 1966)

Personal information
- Nationality: South Korean
- Born: 2 October 1966 (age 59)
- Education: Korea National Sport University

Korean name
- Hangul: 남상란
- Hanja: 南相蘭
- RR: Nam Sangran
- MR: Nam Sangnan

Sport
- Sport: Rowing
Medal record
Women's rowing
Representing South Korea
Asian Games
Silver medal – second place	1986 Seoul	Women's coxed four

Nam Sang-lan (born 2 October 1966) is a South Korean rowing coxswain. She competed in the women's coxed four event at the 1988 Summer Olympics.

Nam attended Korea National Sport University. She won a silver medal in women's coxed four at the 1986 Asian Games with a time of 7:50.57. She later became a teacher at Dalcheon Elementary School in Chungju, South Chungcheong Province. She is a member of the board of directors of the Korean Rowing Association.
