= Guo Mei (rower) =

Chinese rower

Personal information
- Nationality: Chinese
- Born: 24 July 1967 (age 57)

Sport
- Sport: Rowing

Guo Mei (born 24 July 1967) is a Chinese rower. She competed in the women's double sculls event at the 1988 Summer Olympics.
