= Irina Kalimbet =

Soviet rower

Personal information
- Born: 29 February 1968 (age 58) Kaniv, Ukrainian SSR, Soviet Union
- Years active: Irina Volodymyrivna Kalimbet
- Height: 186 cm (6 ft 1 in)
- Weight: 78 kg (172 lb)
- Spouse: Vasily Tikhonov

Sport
- Sport: Rowing
Medal record
Women's rowing
Representing the Soviet Union
Olympic Games
Silver medal – second place	1988 Seoul	Quad sculls
World Rowing Championships
Silver medal – second place	1989 Bled	Quad sculls (W4x)
Bronze medal – third place	1987 Copenhagen	Quad sculls (W4x)

Irina Volodymyrivna Kalimbet (Ukrainian: Ірина Володимирівна Калимбет, later Irina Tikhanova, born 29 February 1968) is a Ukrainian rower who competed for the Soviet Union in the 1988 Summer Olympics. Her husband, Vasily Tikhonov, also competed at the 1988 Olympics in rowing. Their twin daughters Anastasia and Elizaveta are both international rowers.
