= Wang Zifeng =

Chinese rower

Personal information
- Nationality: Chinese
- Born: 12 September 1997 (age 28)

Sport
- Sport: Rowing
Medal record
Women's rowing
Representing China
Olympic Games
Bronze medal – third place	2020 Tokyo	Eight
Asian Games
Gold medal – first place	2022 Hangzhou	Coxless four
Gold medal – first place	2022 Hangzhou	Eight
World University Games
Gold medal – first place	2021 Chengdu	Coxless four
Gold medal – first place	2021 Chengdu	Eight

Wang Zifeng (born 12 September 1997) is a Chinese rower. She competed in the women's eight event at the 2020 Summer Olympics.
