= Matthias Mellinghaus =

German rower (born 1965)

Medal record

Men's rowing

Representing West Germany

Olympic Games
Gold medal – first place	1988 Seoul	Eight

Matthias Mellinghaus (born 10 May 1965 in Iserlohn, North Rhine-Westphalia) is a competition rower and Olympic champion for West Germany.

Mellinghaus won a gold medal in the men's eight at the 1988 Summer Olympics in Seoul, as a member of the rowing team from West Germany.
