= Kook In-sook =

South Korean rower (born 1965)

Personal information
- Nationality: South Korean
- Born: 13 October 1965 (age 59)
- Education: Kyonggi University

Korean name
- Hangul: 국인숙
- Hanja: 鞠仁淑
- RR: Guk Insuk
- MR: Kuk Insuk

Sport
- Sport: Rowing

Kook In-sook (born 13 October 1965) is a South Korean rower. She competed in the women's coxed four event at the 1988 Summer Olympics.

Kook attended Kyonggi University. She represented South Korea in rowing at an international friendly competition in Japan in 1985. She won a silver medal in women's coxed four at the 1986 Asian Games with a time of 7:50.57. She competed at the 1990 Asian Games as well.
