= Thomas Domian =

West German rower

Personal information
- Born: 5 July 1964 (age 62) Gelsenkirchen, North Rhine-Westphalia, West Germany
- Height: 1.98 m (6 ft 6 in)
- Weight: 91 kg (201 lb)

Sport
- Sport: Rowing
- Club: Ruderclub Hansa, Dortmund
Medal record
Men's rowing
Representing West Germany
Olympic Games
Gold medal – first place	1988 Seoul	Eight

Thomas Domian (born 5 July 1964) is a retired West German competition rower who won a gold medal in the coxed eights event at the 1988 Summer Olympics.
