= Ventseslav Kanchev =

Bulgarian rowing cox

Personal information
- Nationality: Bulgarian
- Born: 9 December 1953 (age 71); Plovdiv, Bulgaria
- Height: 168 cm (5 ft 6 in)
- Weight: 55 kg (121 lb)

Sport
- Sport: Rowing

Ventseslav Kanchev (born 9 December 1953) is a Bulgarian rowing coxswain. He competed at the 1980 Summer Olympics and the 1988 Summer Olympics.
