= Aleksandr Lukyanov =

Russian coxswain (born 1949)

Personal information
- Born: 19 August 1949 (age 76) Moscow, Russian SFSR, Soviet Union
Medal record
Men's rowing
Representing the Soviet Union
Olympic Games
Gold medal – first place	1976 Montreal	Coxed four
Silver medal – second place	1980 Moscow	Coxed pair
Silver medal – second place	1988 Seoul	Eight
World Rowing Championships
Gold medal – first place	1974 Lucerne	Coxed pair
Gold medal – first place	1975 Nottingham	Coxed four
Silver medal – second place	1977 Amsterdam	Eight
European Rowing Championships
Gold medal – first place	1973 Moscow	Coxed pair
Bronze medal – third place	1971 Copenhagen	Coxed pair
Representing Russia
Olympic Games
Bronze medal – third place	1996 Atlanta	Eight

Aleksandr Viktorovich Lukyanov (Russian: Александр Викторович Лукьянов, born 19 August 1949) is a Russian coxswain who competed for the Soviet Union in the 1976 Summer Olympics, in the 1980 Summer Olympics, and in the 1988 Summer Olympics and for Russia in the 1996 Summer Olympics and in the 2000 Summer Olympics.

He was born in Moscow.

In 1976 he was the coxswain of the Soviet boat which won the gold medal in the coxed four event.

Four years later he won the silver medal as cox of the Soviet boat in the coxed pair competition.

At the 1988 Games he won his second silver medal when he coxed the Soviet eight.

In Atlanta at the 1996 Olympics he represented Russia and won the bronze medal as part of the Russian boat in the eight contest.

His final Olympic appearance was at the Sydney Games where he finished ninth with the Russian boat in the 2000 eight event.
