= Violeta Ninova =

Bulgarian rower (born 1963)

Personal information
- Born: 19 August 1963 (age 62) Sofia, Bulgaria

Sport
- Sport: Rowing
Medal record
Representing Bulgaria
Olympic Games
Bronze medal – third place	1988 Seoul	Double sculls
World Rowing Championships
Gold medal – first place	1987 Copenhagen	Double sculls
Bronze medal – third place	1983 Duisburg	Coxed quad sculls
Bronze medal – third place	1985 Hazewinkel	Double sculls
Summer Universiade
Silver medal – second place	1987 Zagreb	Quadruple sculls

Violeta Nikolaeva Ninova (Bulgarian: Виолета Николаева Нинова; born 19 August 1963) is a Bulgarian rower.

== Life and career ==
Ninova won a bronze medal in Double sculls with her partner Stefka Madina at the 1988 Seoul Olympic Games. She was born in Sofia.
