= Thomas Möllenkamp =

German rower

Personal information
- Born: 7 October 1961 (age 64) Osnabrück, West Germany
- Height: 1.90 m (6 ft 3 in)
- Weight: 88 kg (194 lb)

Sport
- Sport: Rowing
- Club: Osnabrücker RV
Medal record
Men's rowing
Representing West Germany
Olympic Games
Gold medal – first place	1988 Seoul	Eight

Thomas Möllenkamp (born 7 October 1961) is a retired rower from West Germany who competed at the 1984 Olympics in the coxless pair and at the 1988 Olympics in the eight and finished in fourth and first place, respectively.
