= Viktor Omelyanovich =

Ukrainian rower (born 1958)

Personal information
- Born: 13 April 1958 (age 68) Dnipropetrovsk, Ukrainian SSR, Soviet Union
- Height: 190 cm (6 ft 3 in)
- Weight: 88 kg (194 lb)
- Spouse: Mariya Omelianovych

Sport
- Sport: Rowing
Medal record
Men's rowing
Representing the Soviet Union
Olympic Games
Silver medal – second place	1988 Seoul	Eight
Friendship Games
Gold medal – first place	1984 Moscow	Eight
World Rowing Championships
Gold medal – first place	1985 Hazewinkel	Eight
Silver medal – second place	1986 Nottingham	Eight
Silver medal – second place	1987 Copenhagen	Coxed four
Bronze medal – third place	1981 Munich	Coxed four
Bronze medal – third place	1982 Lucerne	Eight

Viktor Omelyanovich (Ukrainian: Віктор Омелянович; born 13 April 1958 in Dnipropetrovsk) is a Ukrainian rower who competed for the Soviet Union in the 1988 Summer Olympics.
