= Chung In-kyo =

South Korean rower

Personal information
- Nationality: South Korean
- Born: 1 July 1966 (age 58)

Sport
- Sport: Rowing

Chung In-kyo (born 1 July 1966) is a South Korean rowing coxswain. He competed in the men's eight event at the 1988 Summer Olympics.
