= Satoru Miyoshi =

Japanese rower (born 1963)

Personal information
- Nationality: Japanese
- Born: 10 June 1963 (age 62)

Sport
- Sport: Rowing

Satoru Miyoshi (三好 悟, Miyoshi Satoru; born 10 June 1963) is a Japanese rower. He competed at the 1984 Summer Olympics and the 1988 Summer Olympics.
