= Lee Hong-keun =

South Korean rower (born 1965)

Personal information
- Nationality: South Korean
- Born: 28 July 1965 (age 59)

Sport
- Sport: Rowing

Lee Hong-keun (born 28 July 1965) is a South Korean rower. He competed in the men's eight event at the 1988 Summer Olympics.
