= Tomoyuki Okano =

Japanese rower (born 1962)

Personal information
- Full name: 岡野 知幸 Okano Tomoyuki
- Nationality: Japanese
- Born: 4 December 1962 (age 63)

Sport
- Sport: Rowing

Tomoyuki Okano (born 4 December 1962) is a Japanese rower. He competed in the men's eight event at the 1988 Summer Olympics.
