= Antonio Baldacci (rower) =

Italian rower

Personal information
- Nationality: Italian
- Born: 31 May 1951 (age 75)

Sport
- Sport: Rowing

Antonio Baldacci (born 31 May 1951) is an Italian rower. He competed at the 1972 Summer Olympics, 1980 Summer Olympics and the 1988 Summer Olympics.
