= Li Ronghua =

Chinese rowing cox

Olympic medal record

Women's rowing

Representing China
Silver medal – second place	1988 Seoul	Coxed four
Bronze medal – third place	1988 Seoul	Eight

Li Ronghua (Chinese: 李荣华, born 21 September 1956) is a female Chinese rowing cox. She competed at the 1988 Seoul and 1992 Barcelona Summer Olympic Games. Together with her teammates, she won a silver medal in women's coxed four and a bronze medal in women's eight in 1988.
