= Masahiko Nomura =

Japanese rower (born 1963)

Personal information
- Full name: 野村 雅彦 Nomura Masahiko
- Nationality: Japanese
- Born: 11 May 1963 (age 63)

Sport
- Sport: Rowing

Masahiko Nomura (born 11 May 1963) is a Japanese rower. He competed in the men's eight event at the 1988 Summer Olympics.
