= Eiichi Tsukinoki =

Japanese rower (born 1964)

Personal information
- Full name: 槻木 栄一 Tsukinoki Eiichi
- Nationality: Japanese
- Born: 8 April 1964 (age 62)

Sport
- Sport: Rowing

Eiichi Tsukinoki (born 8 April 1964) is a Japanese rower. He competed in the men's eight event at the 1988 Summer Olympics.
