= Kang Min-heung =

South Korean rower (born 1966)

Personal information
- Nationality: South Korean
- Born: 3 October 1966 (age 58)

Sport
- Sport: Rowing

Kang Min-heung (born 3 October 1966) is a South Korean rower. She competed in the women's coxed four event at the 1988 Summer Olympics.
