= Hyun Song-in =

South Korean rower (born 1967)

Personal information
- Nationality: South Korean
- Born: 30 January 1967 (age 58)

Sport
- Sport: Rowing

Hyun Song-in (born 30 January 1967) is a South Korean rower. He competed in the men's eight event at the 1988 Summer Olympics.
