= Andrey Vasilyev =

Soviet rower

Medal record

Men's rowing

Representing the Soviet Union

Olympic Games
Silver medal – second place	1988 Seoul	Eight

World Rowing Championships
Gold medal – first place	1985 Hazewinkel	M8+
Silver medal – second place	1987 Copenhagen	M4-

Andrey Aleksandrovich Vasilyev (Russian: Андрей Васильев; born 27 June 1962) is a Soviet rower.
