= Mohammed Amin Naik =

Indian army general (born 1953)

Major General Mohammed Amin Naik SM (born 25 September 1953) was an Indian Army officer. Major General Naik was commissioned into the Corps of Engineers of the Indian Army in December 1974.

== Early life and education ==
Naik was born in Dadasara village in Pulwama district, Jammu and Kashmir, on 25 September 1953. He studied in Bisco School and attended college at Amar Singh College Srinagar. He joined the Indian Military Academy on 3 January 1973 at the age of 19.

== Military career ==
Naik served as Design Engineer civil and Garrison Engineer with Eastern Naval Command, Visakhapatnam, and was in Army Headquarters as General Staff Officer, DDG PPO, Additional Director General Personals Engineers and was also as Assistant Chief of the Integrated Defense TRIDOC with Headquarters Integrated Defense Staff. He retired on 30 September 2011 from Army HQ's as ADG. In 2008, he became the first Kashmiri Muslim to become a General in the Indian Army.

== Sports career ==
Naik is a champion rower. He has been awarded the highest medal to an Indian sportsman, the Arjuna Award, for his accomplishments in rowing. He won bronze in 1982 Asian Games (coxed pair) and has got 8 gold, one silver, and one bronze in national championships. He has also won two golds, one silver and a bronze in various international championships in rowing.
