= Birgit Peter =

East German rower

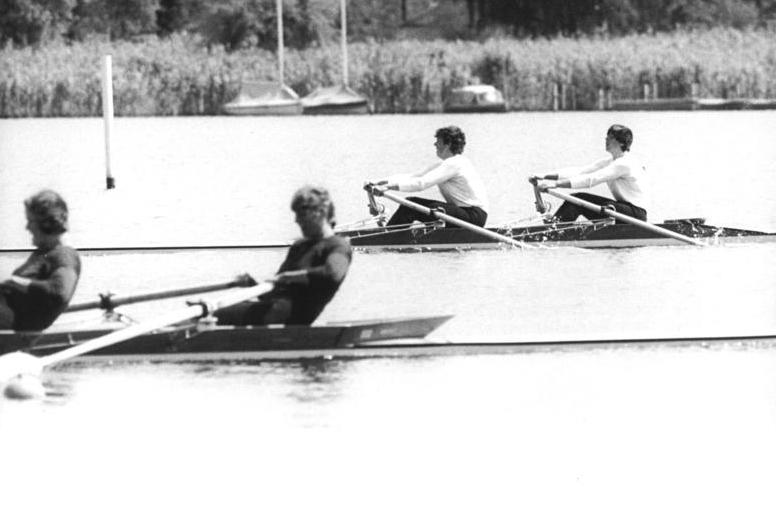
- Birgit Peter (first from left) in 1985

Medal record

Women's rowing

Olympic Games

Representing East Germany
| Gold medal – first place | 1988 Seoul | Double sculls |

Representing Germany
| Gold medal – first place | 1992 Barcelona | Quadruple sculls |

World Rowing Championships

Representing East Germany
| Gold medal – first place | 1985 Hazewinkel | Quadruple sculls |
| Gold medal – first place | 1990 Tasmania | Single scull |
| Silver medal – second place | 1989 Bled | Single scull |

Birgit Peter (born 27 January 1964) is a German rower and double Olympic gold medalist.

== Life and career ==
Peter was born in Potsdam, East Germany. She competed for the SG Dynamo Potsdam / Sportvereinigung (SV) Dynamo, and she won medals at various international rowing competitions. In October 1986, she was awarded a Patriotic Order of Merit in gold (first class) for her sporting success. The Olympic gold medal that she won in 1988 in the double sculls teamed up with Martina Schröter was the 500th Olympic medal won by East Germany.
