= Chung Boo-young =

South Korean rower

Personal information
- Nationality: South Korean
- Born: 1 October 1964 (age 60)

Sport
- Sport: Rowing

Chung Boo-young (born 1 October 1964) is a South Korean rower. He competed in the men's eight event at the 1988 Summer Olympics.
