= Hideaki Maeguchi =

Japanese rower (born 1960)

Personal information
- Nationality: Japanese
- Born: 16 October 1960 (age 65)

Sport
- Sport: Rowing

Hideaki Maeguchi (前口 英明, Maeguchi Hideaki; born 16 October 1960) is a Japanese rower. He competed at the 1984 Summer Olympics and the 1988 Summer Olympics.
