= Shunsuke Kawamoto =

Japanese rower (born 1962)

Personal information
- Nationality: Japanese
- Born: 21 August 1962 (age 62)

Sport
- Sport: Rowing

Shunsuke Kawamoto (川本 俊介, Kawamoto Shunsuke, born 21 August 1962) is a Japanese rower. He competed at the 1984 Summer Olympics and the 1988 Summer Olympics.
