= Tadashi Abe (rower) =

Japanese rower (born 1963)

Personal information
- Nationality: Japanese
- Born: 29 January 1963 (age 63)
- Height: 1.90 m (6 ft 3 in)
- Weight: 80 kg (180 lb)

Sport
- Sport: Rowing

Tadashi Abe (阿部 肇, Abe Tadashi; born 29 January 1963) is a Japanese rower. He competed in the 1984, 1988, and 1992 Summer Olympics. He served as a coach for the Japanese rowing team at the 2012 Summer Olympics, and is currently a professor at Sendai University.
