= Akihisa Hirata =

Japanese rower (born 1963)

Personal information
- Nationality: Japanese
- Born: 13 October 1963 (age 62)

Sport
- Sport: Rowing

Akihisa Hirata (平田 明久, Hirata Akihisa; born 13 October 1963) is a Japanese rower. He competed in the men's eight event at the 1988 Summer Olympics.
