= Wang Hongbing =

Chinese rower

Personal information
- Nationality: Chinese
- Born: 26 November 1962 (age 62)

Sport
- Sport: Rowing

Wang Hongbing (born 26 November 1962) is a Chinese rower. He competed in the men's coxless four event at the 1984 Summer Olympics.
