= Li Jianxin =

Chinese rower

Personal information
- Nationality: Chinese
- Born: 14 January 1957 (age 68)

Sport
- Sport: Rowing

Li Jianxin (born 14 January 1957) is a Chinese rowing cox. He competed in two events at the 1992 Summer Olympics.
