= Yang Xiao (rower) =

Chinese rower

Olympic medal record

Women's rowing
Silver medal – second place	1988 Seoul	Coxed four
Bronze medal – third place	1988 Seoul	Eight

Yang Xiao (Chinese: 楊曉; born 6 March 1964) is a female Chinese rower. Together with her teammates, she won a silver medal in women's coxed four, and a bronze medal in women's eight at the 1988 Seoul Olympic Games.
