= Shunsuke Horiuchi =

Japanese rower (born 1959)

Personal information
- Nationality: Japanese
- Born: 17 December 1959 (age 66)

Sport
- Sport: Rowing

Shunsuke Horiuchi (堀内 俊介, Horiuchi Shunsuke; born 17 December 1959) is a Japanese rower. He competed in the men's single sculls event at the 1984 Summer Olympics.
