= Rowing at the 1992 Summer Olympics – Men's eight =

Men's eight at the Games of the XXV Olympiad
- Venue: Lake of Banyoles
- Dates: 28 July – 2 August 1992
- Competitors: 126 from 14 nations
- Winning time: 5:29.53

Medalists
1st place, gold medalist(s)		Canada: Darren Barber; Andrew Crosby; Michael Forgeron; Robert Marland; Terrence Paul; Derek Porter; Michael Rascher; Bruce Robertson; John Wallace
2nd place, silver medalist(s)		Romania: Iulică Ruican; Viorel Talapan; Vasile Năstase; Gabriel Marin; Dănuț Dobre; Valentin Robu; Vasile Măstăcan; Ioan Vizitiu; Marin Gheorghe
3rd place, bronze medalist(s)		Germany: Roland Baar; Armin Eichholz; Detlef Kirchhoff; Manfred Klein; Bahne Rabe; Frank Richter; Hans Sennewald; Thorsten Streppelhoff; Ansgar Wessling

The men's eight competition at the 1992 Summer Olympics took place at Lake of Banyoles, Spain. It was held from 28 July to 2 August. There were 14 boats (126 competitors) from 14 nations, with each nation limited to a single boat in the event. The event was won by Canada, the nation's second victory (after 1984) to match Great Britain, East Germany, and West Germany for second-most among nations (behind the United States' 11). Romania earned its first medal in the men's eight with silver. A reunited Germany took bronze; West Germany had been the defending champion.

== Background ==
This was the 21st appearance of the event. Rowing had been on the programme in 1896 but was cancelled due to bad weather. The men's eight has been held every time that rowing has been contested, beginning in 1900.

East Germany had been the most successful nation in the men's eight for most of the 1970s and early 1980s; in the latter half of the 1980s, West Germany had risen. The West Germans had won the 1988 Olympics, the 1989 World Rowing Championships, and the 1990 World Rowing Championships; at the 1991 World Rowing Championships, a reunified Germany won again. Germany was thus the favourite in Barcelona. Canada had been the runner-up in the 1990 and 1991 world championships and was the biggest challenger.

The People's Republic of China and South Africa each made their debut in the event; some former Soviet republics competed as the Unified Team. The United States made its 18th appearance, most among nations to that point.

== Competition format ==
The "eight" event featured nine-person boats, with eight rowers and a coxswain. It was a sweep rowing event, with the rowers each having one oar (and thus each rowing on one side). The course used the 2000 metres distance that became the Olympic standard in 1912 (with the exception of 1948). Races were held in up to six lanes.

The competition consisted of three main rounds (heats, semifinals, and finals) as well as a repechage. The 14 boats were divided into three heats for the first round, with 4 or 5 boats in each heat. The top three boats in each heat (9 boats total) advanced directly to the semifinals. The remaining 5 boats were placed in the repechage. The repechage featured a single heat. The top three boats in the repechage advanced to the semifinals. The remaining two boats (4th and 5th place in the repechage) were placed in the "C" final to compete for 13th and 14th places.

The 12 semifinalist boats were divided into two heats of 6 boats each. The top three boats in each semifinal (6 boats total) advanced to the "A" final to compete for medals and 4th through 6th place; the bottom three boats in each semifinal were sent to the "B" final for 7th through 12th.

== Schedule ==
All times are Central European Summer Time (UTC+2)

Date	Time	Round
Tuesday, 28 July 1992	10:50	Quarterfinals
Wednesday, 29 July 1992	18:30	Repechage
Friday, 31 July 1992	12:00	Semifinals
Sunday, 2 August 1992	8:50	Finals

== Results ==
=== Quarterfinals ===
==== Quarterfinal 1 ====
Rank	Rowers	Coxswain	Nation	Time	Notes
1	Darren Barber; Andrew Crosby; Michael Forgeron; Robert Marland; Derek Porter; Michael Rascher; Bruce Robertson; John Wallace	Terrence Paul	Canada	5:32.59	Q
2	Martin Cross; Tim Foster; Richard Phelps; Jim Walker; Ben Hunt-Davis; Stephen Turner; Rupert Obholzer; Jonathan Singfield	Adrian Ellison	Great Britain	5:36.01	Q
3	Martin Walsh; Rogan Clarke; Grant Hillary; Andrew Gordon-Brown; Erich Mauff; Timothy Lahner; Robin McCall; Ivan Pentz	Andrew Lonmon-Davis	South Africa	5:37.83	Q
4	Pavel Menšík; Dušan Businský; Ondřej Holeček; Jiří Šefčík; Pavel Sokol; Petr Blecha; Jan Beneš; Radek Zavadil	Jiří Pták	Czechoslovakia	5:41.85	R
5	Michinori Iwaguro; Hiroyoshi Matsui; Masahiro Sakata; Yasunori Tanabe; Hiroshi Mitome; Kazuhisa Yamani; Takatoshi Iwatsuki; Tadashi Abe	Hidekazu Hayashi	Japan	5:42.97	R

==== Quarterfinal 2 ====
Rank	Rowers	Coxswain	Nation	Time	Notes
1	Iulică Ruican; Viorel Talapan; Vasile Năstase; Gabriel Marin; Dănuț Dobre; Valentin Robu; Vasile Măstăcan; Ioan Vizitiu	Marin Gheorghe	Romania	5:30.21	Q
2	Roland Baar; Armin Eichholz; Detlef Kirchhoff; Bahne Rabe; Frank Richter; Hans Sennewald; Thorsten Streppelhoff; Ansgar Wessling	Manfred Klein	Germany	5:32.98	Q
3	Jens Pørneki; Jørgen Tramm; Thomas Larsen; Lars Christensen; Carsten Hassing; Jesper Thusgård Kristiansen; Martin Haldbo Hansen; Kent Skovsager	Stephen Masters	Denmark	5:34.65	Q
4	Ciro Liguori; Antonio Maurogiovanni; Roberto Blanda; Raffaello Leonardo; Valter Molea; Riccardo Moretti; Giovanni Suarez; Walter Bottega	Dino Lucchetta	Italy	5:46.97	R
5	Josu Andueza; Andreu Canals; José María Claro; Horacio Allegue; Jordi Quer; Garikoitz Azkue; Josép Robert; Juan María Altuna	Carlos Front	Spain	5:48.36	R

==== Quarterfinal 3 ====
Rank	Rowers	Coxswain	Nation	Time	Notes
1	Mike Teti; Chris Sahs; Scott Munn; Jeff Klepacki; Rob Shepherd; Malcolm Baker; Richard Kennelly Jr.; John Parker	Michael Moore	United States	5:33.37	Q
2	Simon Spriggs; Peter Murphy; Wayne Diplock; Jaime Fernandez; Ben Dodwell; Samuel Patten; Bo Hanson; Rob Scott	David Colvin	Australia	5:34.28	Q
3	Vitaliy Raievskiy; Alexandru Britov; Yevgeny Kislyakov; Aleksandr Anikeyev; Sergey Korotkikh; Oleg Sveshnikov; Vasily Tikhonov; Stepan Dmitriyevsky	Igor Shkaberin	Unified Team	5:38.59	Q
4	Yao Jianzhong; Li Zhongping; Feng Feng; Sun Senlin; Huang Xiaoping; Xu Wuling; Zheng Xianwei; Jiang Haiyang	Li Jianxin	China	5:38.98	R

=== Repechage ===
Rank	Rowers	Coxswain	Nation	Time	Notes
1	Ciro Liguori; Antonio Maurogiovanni; Roberto Blanda; Raffaello Leonardo; Valter Molea; Riccardo Moretti; Giovanni Suarez; Walter Bottega	Dino Lucchetta	Italy	5:42.51	Q
2	Yao Jianzhong; Li Zhongping; Feng Feng; Sun Senlin; Huang Xiaoping; Xu Wuling; Zheng Xianwei; Jiang Haiyang	Li Jianxin	China	5:43.55	Q
3	Pavel Menšík; Dušan Businský; Ondřej Holeček; Jiří Šefčík; Pavel Sokol; Petr Blecha; Jan Beneš; Radek Zavadil	Jiří Pták	Czechoslovakia	5:48.18	Q
4	Michinori Iwaguro; Hiroyoshi Matsui; Masahiro Sakata; Yasunori Tanabe; Hiroshi Mitome; Kazuhisa Yamani; Takatoshi Iwatsuki; Tadashi Abe	Hidekazu Hayashi	Japan	5:51.53	QC
5	Josu Andueza; Andreu Canals; José María Claro; Horacio Allegue; Jordi Quer; Garikoitz Azkue; Josép Robert; Juan María Altuna	Carlos Front	Spain	5:53.50	QC

=== Semifinals ===
==== Semifinal 1 ====
Rank	Rowers	Coxswain	Nation	Time	Notes
1	Iulică Ruican; Viorel Talapan; Vasile Năstase; Gabriel Marin; Dănuț Dobre; Valentin Robu; Vasile Măstăcan; Ioan Vizitiu	Marin Gheorghe	Romania	5:33.01	QA
2	Darren Barber; Andrew Crosby; Michael Forgeron; Robert Marland; Derek Porter; Michael Rascher; Bruce Robertson; John Wallace	Terrence Paul	Canada	5:35.11	QA
3	Simon Spriggs; Peter Murphy; Wayne Diplock; Jaime Fernandez; Ben Dodwell; Samuel Patten; Bo Hanson; Rob Scott	David Colvin	Australia	5:35.76	QA
4	Jens Pørneki; Jørgen Tramm; Thomas Larsen; Lars Christensen; Carsten Hassing; Jesper Thusgård Kristiansen; Martin Haldbo Hansen; Kent Skovsager	Stephen Masters	Denmark	5:35.83	QB
5	Martin Walsh; Rogan Clarke; Grant Hillary; Andrew Gordon-Brown; Erich Mauff; Timothy Lahner; Robin McCall; Ivan Pentz	Andrew Lonmon-Davis	South Africa	5:45.13	QB
6	Pavel Menšík; Dušan Businský; Ondřej Holeček; Jiří Šefčík; Pavel Sokol; Petr Blecha; Jan Beneš; Radek Zavadil	Jiří Pták	Czechoslovakia	5:45.32	QB

==== Semifinal 2 ====
Rank	Rowers	Coxswain	Nation	Time	Notes
1	Roland Baar; Armin Eichholz; Detlef Kirchhoff; Bahne Rabe; Frank Richter; Hans Sennewald; Thorsten Streppelhoff; Ansgar Wessling	Manfred Klein	Germany	5:35.60	QA
2	Mike Teti; Chris Sahs; Scott Munn; Jeff Klepacki; Rob Shepherd; Malcolm Baker; Richard Kennelly Jr.; John Parker	Michael Moore	United States	5:37.11	QA
3	Martin Cross; Tim Foster; Richard Phelps; Jim Walker; Ben Hunt-Davis; Stephen Turner; Rupert Obholzer; Jonathan Singfield	Adrian Ellison	Great Britain	5:39.79	QA
4	Ciro Liguori; Antonio Maurogiovanni; Roberto Blanda; Raffaello Leonardo; Valter Molea; Riccardo Moretti; Giovanni Suarez; Walter Bottega	Dino Lucchetta	Italy	5:40.89	QB
5	Yao Jianzhong; Li Zhongping; Feng Feng; Sun Senlin; Huang Xiaoping; Xu Wuling; Zheng Xianwei; Jiang Haiyang	Li Jianxin	China	5:44.82	QB
6	Vitaliy Raievskiy; Alexandru Britov; Yevgeny Kislyakov; Aleksandr Anikeyev; Sergey Korotkikh; Oleg Sveshnikov; Vasily Tikhonov; Stepan Dmitriyevsky	Igor Shkaberin	Unified Team	5:48.41	QB

=== Finals ===
==== Final C ====
Rank	Rowers	Coxswain	Nation	Time
13	Michinori Iwaguro; Hiroyoshi Matsui; Masahiro Sakata; Yasunori Tanabe; Hiroshi Mitome; Kazuhisa Yamani; Takatoshi Iwatsuki; Tadashi Abe	Hidekazu Hayashi	Japan	6:02.44
14	Josu Andueza; Andreu Canals; José María Claro; Horacio Allegue; Jordi Quer; Garikoitz Azkue; Josép Robert; Juan María Altuna	Carlos Front	Spain	6:10.45

==== Final B ====
Rank	Rowers	Coxswain	Nation	Time
7	Jens Pørneki; Jørgen Tramm; Thomas Larsen; Lars Christensen; Carsten Hassing; Jesper Thusgård Kristiansen; Martin Haldbo Hansen; Kent Skovsager	Stephen Masters	Denmark	5:41.61
8	Martin Walsh; Rogan Clarke; Grant Hillary; Andrew Gordon-Brown; Erich Mauff; Timothy Lahner; Robin McCall; Ivan Pentz	Andrew Lonmon-Davis	South Africa	5:42.58
9	Ciro Liguori; Antonio Maurogiovanni; Roberto Blanda; Raffaello Leonardo; Valter Molea; Riccardo Moretti; Giovanni Suarez; Walter Bottega	Dino Lucchetta	Italy	5:43.33
10	Vitaliy Raievskiy; Alexandru Britov; Yevgeny Kislyakov; Aleksandr Anikeyev; Sergey Korotkikh; Oleg Sveshnikov; Vasily Tikhonov; Stepan Dmitriyevsky	Igor Shkaberin	Unified Team	5:43.52
11	Yao Jianzhong; Li Zhongping; Feng Feng; Sun Senlin; Huang Xiaoping; Xu Wuling; Zheng Xianwei; Jiang Haiyang	Li Jianxin	China	5:44.01
12	Pavel Menšík; Dušan Businský; Ondřej Holeček; Jiří Šefčík; Pavel Sokol; Petr Blecha; Jan Beneš; Radek Zavadil	Jiří Pták	Czechoslovakia	5:47.77

==== Final A ====
Rank	Rowers	Coxswain	Nation	Time
1st place, gold medalist(s)	Darren Barber; Andrew Crosby; Michael Forgeron; Robert Marland; Derek Porter; Michael Rascher; Bruce Robertson; John Wallace	Terrence Paul	Canada	5:29.53
2nd place, silver medalist(s)	Iulică Ruican; Viorel Talapan; Vasile Năstase; Gabriel Marin; Dănuț Dobre; Valentin Robu; Vasile Măstăcan; Ioan Vizitiu	Marin Gheorghe	Romania	5:29.67
3rd place, bronze medalist(s)	Roland Baar; Armin Eichholz; Detlef Kirchhoff; Bahne Rabe; Frank Richter; Hans Sennewald; Thorsten Streppelhoff; Ansgar Wessling	Manfred Klein	Germany	5:31.00
4	Mike Teti; Chris Sahs; Scott Munn; Jeff Klepacki; Rob Shepherd; Malcolm Baker; Richard Kennelly Jr.; John Parker	Michael Moore	United States	5:33.18
5	Simon Spriggs; Peter Murphy; Wayne Diplock; Jaime Fernandez; Ben Dodwell; Samuel Patten; Bo Hanson; Rob Scott	David Colvin	Australia	5:33.72
6	Martin Cross; Tim Foster; Richard Phelps; Jim Walker; Ben Hunt-Davis; Stephen Turner; Rupert Obholzer; Jonathan Singfield	Adrian Ellison	Great Britain	5:39.92

== Final classification ==
The following rowers took part:

Rank	Rowers	Coxswain	Nation
1st place, gold medalist(s)	Darren Barber; Andrew Crosby; Michael Forgeron; Robert Marland; Terrence Paul; Derek Porter; Michael Rascher; Bruce Robertson	John Wallace	Canada
2nd place, silver medalist(s)	Iulică Ruican; Viorel Talapan; Vasile Năstase; Gabriel Marin; Dănuț Dobre; Valentin Robu; Vasile Măstăcan; Ioan Vizitiu	Marin Gheorghe	Romania
3rd place, bronze medalist(s)	Roland Baar; Armin Eichholz; Detlef Kirchhoff; Ansgar Wessling; Bahne Rabe; Frank Richter; Hans Sennewald; Thorsten Streppelhoff	Manfred Klein	Germany
	Mike Teti; Chris Sahs; Scott Munn; Jeff Klepacki; Rob Shepherd; Malcolm Baker; Richard Kennelly Jr.; John Parker	Michael Moore	United States
	Simon Spriggs; Peter Murphy; Wayne Diplock; Jaime Fernandez; Ben Dodwell; Samuel Patten; Bo Hanson; Rob Scott	David Colvin	Australia
	Martin Cross; Tim Foster; Richard Phelps; Jim Walker; Ben Hunt-Davis; Stephen Turner; Rupert Obholzer; Jonathan Singfield	Adrian Ellison	Great Britain
	Jens Pørneki; Jørgen Tramm; Thomas Larsen; Lars Christensen; Carsten Hassing; Jesper Thusgård Kristiansen; Martin Haldbo Hansen; Kent Skovsager	Stephen Masters	Denmark
	Martin Walsh; Rogan Clarke; Grant Hillary; Andrew Gordon-Brown; Erich Mauff; Timothy Lahner; Robin McCall; Ivan Pentz	Andrew Lonmon-Davis	South Africa
	Ciro Liguori; Antonio Maurogiovanni; Roberto Blanda; Raffaello Leonardo; Valter Molea; Riccardo Moretti; Giovanni Suarez; Walter Bottega	Dino Lucchetta	Italy
	Vitaliy Raievskiy; Alexandru Britov; Yevgeny Kislyakov; Aleksandr Anikeyev; Sergey Korotkikh; Oleg Sveshnikov; Vasily Tikhonov; Stepan Dmitriyevsky	Igor Shkaberin	Unified Team
	Yao Jianzhong; Li Zhongping; Feng Feng; Sun Senlin; Huang Xiaoping; Xu Wuling; Zheng Xianwei; Jiang Haiyang	Li Jianxin	China
	Pavel Menšík; Dušan Businský; Ondřej Holeček; Jiří Šefčík; Pavel Sokol; Petr Blecha; Jan Beneš; Radek Zavadil	Jiří Pták	Czechoslovakia
	Michinori Iwaguro; Hiroyoshi Matsui; Masahiro Sakata; Yasunori Tanabe; Hiroshi Mitome; Kazuhisa Yamani; Takatoshi Iwatsuki; Tadashi Abe	Hidekazu Hayashi	Japan
	Josu Andueza; Andreu Canals; José María Claro; Horacio Allegue; Jordi Quer; Garikoitz Azkue; Josép Robert; Juan María Altuna	Carlos Front	Spain
