= Rowing at the 1990 Asian Games =

- Venue: Jianhaihu Aquatic Centre
- Dates: 23–26 September 1990

For the Rowing competition at the 1990 Asian Games in Jianhaihu Aquatic Centre, Beijing, China, men's and women's singles, doubles, and fours competed from September 23 to September 26.

== Medalists ==
=== Men ===
Event	Gold	Silver	Bronze
Single sculls	Li Zhongping; China	Lim Kyung-suk; South Korea	Han Min-chol; North Korea
Double sculls	China; Chen Aiguo; Huang Xiaoping	Japan; Tadashi Abe; Masahiro Sakata	North Korea; Chong Gwang-sok; Pak Mun-chol
Coxless pair	China; Feng Feng; Xu Wuling	South Korea; Jo Jun-hyung; Lee Ki-hyun	India; Surinder Singh; Rajender Singh Bhanwala
Coxless four	China; Xu Quan; Wang Xinyue; Yao Jianzhong; Wang Yaodong	South Korea; Hwang Hee-taek; Lee Hyung-ki; Ha Jin-sik; Yoon Nam-ho	India; Gajendran; Jasbir Singh; Surinder Singh; P. M. Pathak
Eight	China; Li Jianxin; Chen Changchuan; Jiang Haiyang; Liang Hong; Chen Jian; Yao Liping; Jia Qingbin; Sun Senlin; Zheng Xianwei	Japan; Yasunori Tanabe; Hidekazu Hayashi; Hiroyoshi Matsui; Satoru Miyoshi; Hiroshi Mitome; Kazuhiko Kurata; Masateru Kiriyama; Michinori Iwaguro; Yasushi Hori	South Korea; Kim Woong-hak; Hwang Hee-taek; Lee Hyung-ki; Ha Jin-sik; Lee Ki-hyun; Yoon Nam-ho; An Sang-jin; Hong Seong-kyun; Kim Sung-soo
Lightweight single sculls	Shen Hongfei; China	Kim Il-yong; North Korea	Dalbir Singh; India
Lightweight double sculls	China; Fang Shangiang; Xie Yifan	North Korea; Kim Gwang-il; Kim In-guk	India; Dalbir Singh; Ramanjit Singh
Lightweight coxless four	China; Zheng Bingxue; Zhang Shaoyun; He Yaqiang; Zhao Zedong	Japan; Katsura Kajihara; Kiyoaki Murata; Masaru Higashitani; Yoshihiro Sogo	South Korea; Jo Jun-hyung; Jang Hyeon-cheol; Lee In-ki; Choi Kyung-wook

=== Women ===
Event	Gold	Silver	Bronze
Single sculls	Cao Mianying; China	Ro Hong-sun; North Korea	Kang Sin-sook; South Korea
Coxless pair	China; Zhou Shouying; Liu Xirong	South Korea; Lee Jae-nam; Kim Sung-ok	North Korea; Un Gum-nyo; Kim Yong-hui
Coxless four	China; Guo Mei; He Yanwen; Hu Yadong; Zhang Li	Japan; Mayumi Oku; Miyuki Yamashita; Nobuko Ota; Rumi Sasakawa	South Korea; Kook In-sook; Kang Min-heung; Lee Jae-nam; Kim Sung-ok
Lightweight single sculls	Liang Sanmei; China	Ryoko Orihashi; Japan	Kim Yeon-hee; South Korea
Lightweight double sculls	China; Liao Xiaoli; Huang Jielan	North Korea; Pae Jong-ae; Sung Ok-sun	Japan; Kazuyo Urakami; Maki Kurihara
Lightweight coxless four	China; Zhang Huajie; Zeng Meilan; Lin Zhiai; Yan Dongling	North Korea; Chon Gyong-ok; Ro Hyong-suk; Choi Ryong-sun; Kim Yong-ae	Indonesia; Juliati; Nelliewatiy; Tuah; Tutie

== Medal table ==
Rank	Nation	Gold	Silver	Bronze	Total
1	China (CHN)	14	0	0	14
2	North Korea (PRK)	0	5	3	8
3	Japan (JPN)	0	5	1	6
4	South Korea (KOR)	0	4	5	9
5	India (IND)	0	0	4	4
6	Indonesia (INA)	0	0	1	1
Totals (6 entries)		14	14	14	42
