= Rowing at the 1994 Asian Games =

- Venue: Ashida River
- Dates: 7–10 October 1994

For the Rowing competition at the 1994 Asian Games in Hiroshima, Japan, men's and women's singles, doubles, and fours competed from October 7 to October 10.

== Medalists ==
=== Men ===
Event	Gold	Silver	Bronze
Single sculls	Huang Xiaoping; China	Sergeý Bormotin; Turkmenistan	Georgiy Bartenev; Kazakhstan
Double sculls	China; Liang Hongming; Liu Xianbin	Turkmenistan; Dmitriý Morozow; Sergeý Bormotin	Japan; Hitoshi Hase; Takehiko Kubo
Coxless pair	China; Feng Feng; Xu Wuling	Turkmenistan; Dmitriý Krupin; Waleriý Gussar	India; Jagjit Singh; Rajender Prahlad Shilke
Coxless four	China; Liang Hongming; Li Peilong; Ji Renxu; Liu Xianbin	Japan; Yasunori Tanabe; Hiroyoshi Matsui; Kenji Hashimoto; Takatoshi Iwatsuki	Turkmenistan; Dmitriý Krupin; Mihail Baboviç; Roman Napalkow; Waleriý Gussar
Eight	China; Li Jianxin; Cai Yukun; Zhang Binggui; Sun Jun; Tian Qiqiang; Sun Senlin; Zheng Xianwei; Hu Jiaqi; Cao Junwei	Japan; Tatsuya Mizutani; Hidekazu Hayashi; Masahiko Nomura; Kazuhiko Kurata; Makoto Mura; Shigeyoshi Yanaka; Takamasa Sakai; Tetsuro Tanoue; Yukuo Ishitoya	South Korea; Lee Ki-hyun; Kim Sung-soo; Kim Chul-won; Suh Dae-mun; Her Hoi-young; Jang Hyun-chul; Lee Kan-ho; Kim Koo-hyun; Kim Tae-wook
Lightweight double sculls	Japan; Hiroshi Sugito; Kenichi Obinata	China; Cheng Hongzheng; Wu Lizhi	Hong Kong; Chau Fung Yau; Chiang Wing Hung
Lightweight coxless four	China; Shen Hongfei; Sun Guobin; Song Liangyou; Gong Xuhong	Japan; Michinori Iwaguro; Yoshihiro Sogo; Hiroyuki Ito; Katsuhiko Nakamizo	South Korea; Choi Kyung-wook; Han Jae-dong; Yoon Sang-jin; Hong Suk-ho

=== Women ===
Event	Gold	Silver	Bronze
Single sculls	Cao Mianying; China	Ho Kim Fai; Hong Kong	Kim Mi-jung; South Korea
Coxless pair	China; Pei Jiayun; Jing Yanhua	South Korea; Kim Chung; Sun Yoo-sun	Japan; Rimi Kurahara; Shuko Matsumoto
Coxless four	China; Wang Shujuan; Liu Xirong; Liang Xiling; Jiang Zhifang	Japan; Hitomi Yamaguchi; Nami Sakamoto; Naomi Nakanishi; Naomi Wakasa	Chinese Taipei; Lin Chia-hui; Huang Shu-mei; Lin Ya-ting; Chuang Yen-chun
Lightweight double sculls	China; Zhong Aifang; Ou Shaoyan	Japan; Eri Nonaka; Rie Saito	Hong Kong; Tsang Hau Yuk; Malina Ngai
Lightweight coxless four	China; Zhong Aifang; Ou Shaoyan; Wang Fang; Ding Yahong	Japan; Kazuyo Urakami; Miyuki Yamashita; Michiyo Morishita; Yukiko Ochi	None awarded

== Medal table ==
Rank	Nation	Gold	Silver	Bronze	Total
1	China (CHN)	11	1	0	12
2	Japan (JPN)	1	6	2	9
3	Turkmenistan (TKM)	0	3	1	4
4	South Korea (KOR)	0	1	3	4
5	Hong Kong (HKG)	0	1	2	3
6	Chinese Taipei (TPE)	0	0	1	1
6	India (IND)	0	0	1	1
6	Kazakhstan (KAZ)	0	0	1	1
Totals (8 entries)		12	12	11	35
