= 1993 World Rowing Championships =

International rowing event

- Location: Račice, Czech Republic
- Dates: 30 August to 5 September

The 1993 World Rowing Championships were World Rowing Championships that were held from 30 August to 5 September 1993 at Račice, Czech Republic.

== Medal summary ==
=== Men's events ===
Event	Gold	Time	Silver	Time	Bronze	Time
M1x	Canada; Derek Porter	6:59.03	Czech Republic; Václav Chalupa	7:00.56	Germany; Thomas Lange	7:04.35
M2x	France; Samuel Barathay; Yves Lamarque	6:24.69	Norway; Lars Bjønness; Rolf Thorsen	6:28.42	Germany; Christian Händle; Peter Uhrig	6:29.03
M4x	Germany; Andreas Hajek; André Steiner; Stephan Volkert; André Willms	5:43.99	Ukraine; Oleksandr Marchenko; Leonid Shaposhnikov; Mykola Chupryna; Oleksandr Zaskalko	5:46.25	Italy; Alessandro Corona; Gianluca Farina; Rossano Galtarossa; Massimo Paradiso	5:47.07
M2+	Great Britain; Greg Searle; Jonny Searle; Garry Herbert	7:01.50	Italy; Carmine Abbagnale; Giuseppe Abbagnale; Giuseppe Di Capua	7:03.59	Germany; Michael Peter; Thomas Woddow; Kuno Hochhuth	7:04.91
M2-	Great Britain; Matthew Pinsent; Steve Redgrave	6:36.98	Germany; Detlef Kirchhoff; Hans Sennewald	6:38.51	Slovenia; Iztok Čop; Denis Žvegelj	6:39.58
M4+	Romania; Dorin Alupei; Iulică Ruican; Nicolae Țaga; Viorel Talapan; Marin Gheorghe	6:14.64	Czech Republic; Petr Blecha; Michal Dalecký; Jiří Šefčík; Pavel Sokol; Oldřich Hejdušek	6:17.50	Germany; Stefan Forster; Mark Kleinschmidt; Ulrich Viefers; Marc Weber; Guido Groß	6:17.78
M4-	France; Michel Andrieux; Daniel Fauché; Philippe Lot; Jean-Christophe Rolland	6:04.54	Poland; Wojciech Jankowski; Maciej Łasicki; Jacek Streich; Tomasz Tomiak	6:06.63	United States; Thomas Bohrer; Sean Hall; Jeffrey Klepacki; James Neil	6:08.50
M8+	Germany; Roland Baar; Peter Hoeltzenbein; Andreas Lütkefels; Frank Richter; Stefan Scholz; Martin Steffes-Mies; Thorsten Streppelhoff; Colin von Ettingshausen; Peter Thiede	5:37.08	Romania; Dorin Alupei; Vasile Măstăcan; Vasile Năstase; Cornel Nemțoc; Valentin Robu; Iulică Ruican; Viorel Talapan; Ioan Vizitiu; Marin Gheorghe	5:39.33	United States; Jon Brown; William Castle; Fredric Honebein; Jamie Koven; Tom Murray; Michael Peterson; William Porter; Don Smith; Steven Segaloff	5:41.47
Men's lightweight events
LM1x	Great Britain; Peter Haining	7:05.34	Australia; Stephen Hawkins	7:06.66	Netherlands; Pepijn Aardewijn	7:07.70
LM2x	Australia; Bruce Hick; Gary Lynagh	6:20.64	Switzerland; Markus Gier; Michael Gier	6:20.73	Italy; Francesco Esposito; Paolo Pittino	6:21.94
LM4x	Austria; Gernot Faderbauer; Walter Rantasa; Christoph Schmölzer; Wolfgang Sigl	5:49.30	Germany; Klaus Götte; Frank Günder; Andreas Lutz; Bernhard Rühling Italy; Michelangelo Crispi; Enrico Gandola; Massimo Lana; Ivano Zasio	5:51.00	tie for second place	
LM2-	Spain; Fernando Climent; Fernando Molina Castillo	6:39.34	Russia; Vladimir Mitiuchev; Alexandr Ustinov	6:40.77	Germany; Stephan Fahrig; Herbert Vogt	6:40.79
LM4-	United States; Thomas Beetham; Matthew Collins; Chris Kerber; Jonathan Moss	6:03.27	Switzerland; Markus Feusi; Reto Fierz; Nicolai Kern; Hubert Wagner	6:03.99	Italy; Sabino Bellomo; Franco Cattaneo; Danilo Fraquelli; Alfredo Striani	6:04.59
LM8+	Canada; Dave Boyes; Christopher Cookson; Robert Fontaine; Gavin Hassett; Jeffrey Lay; Brian Peaker; Peter Sommerwil; Bryan Thompson; Pat Newman	5:39.17	Denmark; Johnny Bo Andersen; Svend Blitskov; Eskild Ebbesen; Niels Henriksen; Jeppe Jensen Kollat; Jacob Meyer; Thomas Poulsen; Bo Vestergaard; Stephen Masters	5:41.25	Italy; Enrico Barbaranelli; Carlo Gaddi; Carlo Grande; Pasquale Marigliano; Leonardo Pettinari; Paolo Ramoni; Fabrizio Ranieri; Andrea Re; Gaetano Iannuzzi	5:41.53

=== Women's events ===
Event	Gold	Time	Silver	Time	Bronze	Time
W1x	Germany; Jana Thieme	7:26.00	Canada; Marnie McBean	7:27.42	Denmark; Trine Hansen	7:28.14
W2x	New Zealand; Philippa Baker; Brenda Lawson	7:03.42	Germany; Kathrin Boron; Kerstin Köppen	7:05.61	Bulgaria; Galina Kamenova; Daniela Oronova	7:07.26
W4x	China; Cao Mianying; Gu Xiaoli; Liu Xirong; Zhang Xiuyun	6:21.07	Germany; Daniela Molle; Kerstin Müller; Kristina Mundt; Angela Schuster	6:24.31	United States; Ruth Davidon; Serena Eddy-Moulton; Michelle Knox-Zaloom; Monica Tranel-Michini	6:33.98
W2-	France; Hélène Cortin; Christine Gossé	7:24.74	Australia; Alison Davies; Victoria Toogood	7:27.21	United States; Elizabeth McCagg; Mary McCagg	7:27.65
W4-	China; Pei Jiayun; Wang Shujuan; Zhou Yaxin; Jing Yanhua	6:42.06	United States; Amy Fuller; Melissa Iverson; Anne Kakela; Katherine Scanlon Lewis	6:42.72	Canada; Shannon Crawford; Julie Jespersen Platt; Kelly Mahon; Emma Robinson	6:43.32
W8+	Romania; Angela Alupei; Iulia Bobeică-Bulie; Veronica Cochela; Lenuta Doroftei; Doina Ignat; Viorica Neculai; Ioana Olteanu; Anca Tănase; Cristina Ilie	6:18.88	United States; Jennifer Dore; Catriona Fallon; Amy Fuller; Anne Kakela; Laurel Korholz; Elizabeth McCagg; Katherine Scanlon Lewis; Monica Tranel-Michini; Yasmin Farooq	6:20.42	Germany; Kathrin Haacker; Andrea Klapheck; Micaela Schmidt; Doreen Martin; Dana Pyritz; Antje Rehaag; Ute Wagner; Stefani Werremeier; Doreen Schnell	6:21.52
Women's lightweight events
LW1x	Canada; Michelle Darvill	7:47.14	Netherlands; Laurien Vermulst	7:51.37	Denmark; Mette Bloch Jensen	7:52.52
LW2x	Canada; Colleen Miller; Wendy Wiebe	6:59.74	China; Li Fei; Fang Wang	7:01.33	Netherlands; Ellen Meliesie; Cindy Rip	7:01.66
LW4-	Great Britain; Alison Brownless; Annamarie Dryden; Jane Hall; Tonia Williams	6:45.30	Canada; Nori Doobenen; Tracy Duncan; Maureen Harriman; Rachel Starr	6:48.87	United States; Barbara Byrne; Danika Holbrook-Harris; Alexandra Overy; Alison Shaw	6:49.47

== Medal table ==
Place	Nation	1st place, gold medalist(s)	2nd place, silver medalist(s)	3rd place, bronze medalist(s)	Total
1	Canada	4	2	1	7
2	Great Britain	4			4
3	Germany	3	4	6	13
4	France	3			3
5	China	2	1		3
5	Romania	2	1		3
7	United States	1	2	5	8
8	Australia	1	2		3
9	Austria	1			1
9	Spain	1			1
9	New Zealand	1			1
12	Czech Republic		2		2
12	Switzerland		2		2
14	Italy		2	4	6
15	Denmark		1	2	3
15	Netherlands		1	2	3
17	Norway		1		1
17	Poland		1		1
17	Russia		1		1
17	Ukraine		1		1
21	Bulgaria			1	1
21	Slovenia			1	1
Total		23	24	22	69
