= Korotkikh =

Korotkikh (Russian: Коротких, from короткий meaning short) is a gender-neutral Russian surname.

- Sergey Korotkikh (born 1967), Soviet rower
- Yuri Korotkikh (1939–2016), Soviet footballer
