= Stepan Dmitriyevsky =

Soviet rower

Personal information
- Nationality: Soviet
- Born: 24 November 1966
- Died: 3 March 2011 (aged 44)

Sport
- Sport: Rowing
Medal record
Representing Soviet Union
Summer Universiade
Silver medal – second place	1989 Duisburg	Eights

Stepan Dmitriyevsky (24 November 1966 – 3 March 2011) was a Soviet rower. He competed in the men's eight event at the 1992 Summer Olympics.
