= Thomas Larsen =

Thomas Larsen may refer to:

- Thomas Larsen (tennis) (born 1975), Danish tennis player
- Thomas Larsen (rower, born 1968), Danish rower
- Thomas Larsen (rower, born 1980), Danish rower
- Thomas Bo Larsen (born 1963), Danish film actor
- Thomas Larsen (bowler) (born 1985), Danish ten-pin bowler
- Thomas Larsen (footballer)
