= Quer =

Quer may refer to:

== People ==
- Jordi Quer (born 1970), Spanish rower
- José Quer y Martínez (1695–1764), Spanish physician and botanist
- Pius Font i Quer (1888–1964), Spanish botanist, pharmacist and chemist

== Places ==
- Quer, Guadalajara, Spain

== Other ==
- quer is the Portuguese word for "he/she/it wants/loves"
