= Juan María Altuna =

Spanish rower

Personal information
- Full name: Juan María Altuna Muñoa
- Born: 8 August 1963 (age 63) Hondarribia, Basque Country, Spain

Sport
- Sport: Rowing
Medal record
Men's rowing
Representing Spain
World Rowing Championships
Gold medal – first place	1983 Duisburg	Lwt men's four
Summer Universiade
Silver medal – second place	1989 Duisburg	Lwt coxless fours

Juan María Altuna Muñoa (born 8 August 1963) is a Spanish lightweight rower. He won a gold medal at the 1983 World Rowing Championships in Duisburg with the lightweight men's four. He competed in the men's eight event at the 1992 Summer Olympics.
