= Businsky =

Businsky or Businský is a surname. Notable people with the surname include:

- Dušan Businský (born 1968), Czech rower
- Mary Businsky (1875–1964), known professionally as Madlaine Traverse, American actress
