= Zhang Huajie =

Chinese rower

Personal information
- National team: China

Sport
- Sport: Rowing
Medal record
Representing China
World Championships
Gold medal – first place	1988 Milan	Lwt coxless fours
Gold medal – first place	1989 Bled	Lwt coxless fours
Bronze medal – third place	1990 Tasmania	Lwt coxless fours
Summer Universiade
Gold medal – first place	1989 Duisburg	Lwt double sculls
Asian Games
Gold medal – first place	1990 Beijing	Liwt coxless fours

Zhang Huajie is a Chinese rower. She has won medals in the lightweight women's four at World Rowing Championships in 1988 (gold), 1989 (gold), and 1990 (bronze).
