= Frank Richter (rower) =

German rower

Personal information
- Born: 22 September 1964 (age 61) Hanover, West Germany

Sport
- Sport: Rowing
Medal record
Representing West Germany
World Rowing Championships
Gold medal – first place	1990 Tasmania	Eights
Summer Universiade
Silver medal – second place	1989 Duisburg	Coxless pairs
Representing Germany
Olympic Games
Bronze medal – third place	1992 Barcelona	Eights
Silver medal – second place	1996 Atlanta	Eights
World Rowing Championships
Gold medal – first place	1993 Račice	Eights
Gold medal – first place	1995 Tampere	Eights

Frank Jörg Richter (born 22 September 1964) is a German Olympic rower who won a silver and bronze medal. He is a triple-world champion with the German men's eight.
