= Jesper Kristiansen =

Jesper Kristiansen may refer to:

- Jesper Kristiansen (speedway rider), Danish speedway rider
- Jesper Thusgård Kristiansen, Danish rower
