= Ciro Liguori =

Italian rower

Personal information
- Nationality: Italian
- Born: 29 November 1969 (age 56) Salerno, Italy

Sport
- Sport: Rowing
Medal record
Representing Italy
World Championships
Bronze medal – third place	1995 Tampere	Coxed fours
Mediterranean Games
Gold medal – first place	1991 Athens	Coxless fours
Summer Universiade
Gold medal – first place	1989 Duisburg	Eights

Ciro Liguori (born 29 November 1969) is an Italian rower. He competed in the men's eight event at the 1992 Summer Olympics.
