= Bulgarian Grand Prix =

Proposed Formula One Grand Prix

- Proposed circuit near Pleven (planned); Pleven, Pleven Province, Bulgaria

Race information
- Number of times held: 0
- First held: Never held

The Bulgarian Grand Prix (Bulgarian: Голяма награда на България, pronounced [ˈɡɐˈlʲamɐ nɐˈɡradɐ nɐ bɐɫˈɡarijɐ]) was a proposed Formula One Grand Prix intended to be held in Bulgaria. Plans to host a race were reported in 2006, followed by a more developed bid in 2008 and 2009. The later proposal targeted a debut for the 2011 season and included plans for a new circuit near Pleven in northern Bulgaria. The project was suspended in November 2009 amid financial difficulties.

== History ==
=== 2006 proposal ===
In September 2006, reports emerged of a proposal to construct a motor racing circuit near Kavarna, a town on Bulgaria's Black Sea coast. The project reportedly involved a consortium of foreign investors and an estimated investment of €15 million. However, the announcement did not establish that a Formula One race had been secured, and the project remained at the proposal stage.

=== 2008–2009 bid ===
In December 2008, Bulgarian motorsport officials announced plans to pursue a Formula One race. Bogdan Nikolov, president of the Bulgarian Motorcycling Federation (BMF), was among the principal advocates of the initiative. The proposal envisaged a new permanent circuit near Pleven, and organisers hoped to host the first race in 2011.

The proposed venue was associated with wider ambitions to attract international motorcycle and motor racing competitions to Bulgaria. Officials intended to submit a formal bid to the Fédération Internationale de l'Automobile (FIA), Formula One's governing body.

In July 2009, Bulgarian representatives planned to meet Formula One commercial rights holder Bernie Ecclestone at the German Grand Prix at the Nürburgring. The organisers hoped to negotiate a contract beginning in 2011 and initially extending through 2015, with an option for a further extension to 2020. Rumen Petkov, chairman of the Bulgarian Grand Prix organising committee, was involved in the negotiations. Although the bid received international media coverage, no Bulgarian Grand Prix was added to the Formula One World Championship calendar.

=== Suspension of the project ===
In November 2009, the Bulgarian Grand Prix proposal was reported to have been suspended. The Bulgarian Motorcycling Federation announced that it would suspend its activities from 1 December 2009 while awaiting clarification of its finances for 2010. Jean Todt, FIA's then-newly-elected president, denied the FIA receiving a formal request to hold a round of the F1 championships in Bulgaria. The then-Bulgarian Sports Minister Svilen Neykov had announced earlier that only "land for construction" would be provided by the government, leading to BMF canceling any bid for a F1 race.
