= Hassing =

Hassing is a Danish and German language habitational surname. Notable people with the name include:

- Anne Louise Hassing (born 1967), Danish actress
- Carsten Hassing (born 1967), Danish rower
