= Klepacki =

Klepacki (feminine Klepacka) is a Polish surname. Notable people with the surname include:

- Frank Klepacki, American musician, video game composer and sound director
- Jeffrey Klepacki (born 1968), American rower
- Zofia Klepacka (born 1986), Polish windsurfer
