= Vizitiu =

Vizitiu, meaning "charioteer", is a Romanian surname. Notable people with the surname include:

- Ioan Vizitiu (born 1970), Romanian rower
- Patricia Vizitiu (born 1988), Romanian handball player
