= Vasile Năstase =

Romanian rower

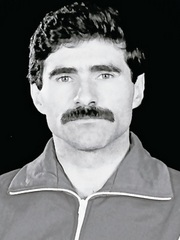

Personal information
- Born: 1 January 1962 (age 64) Podu, Romania
- Height: 191 cm (6 ft 3 in)
- Weight: 96 kg (212 lb)

Sport
- Sport: Rowing
- Club: Dinamo Bucharest
Medal record
Representing Romania
Olympic Games
Silver medal – second place	1992 Barcelona	Eight
World Rowing Championships
Gold medal – first place	1989 Bled	Coxed four
Silver medal – second place	1993 Račice	Eight
Bronze medal – third place	1994 Indianapolis	Eight
Summer Universiade
Gold medal – first place	1987 Zagreb	Coxed fours
Gold medal – first place	1989 Duisburg	Coxed fours

Vasile Dorel Năstase (born 1 January 1962) is a retired Romanian rower. Competing in eights he won silver medals at the 1992 Olympics and 1993 World Championships. He also won the world title in coxed fours in 1989.
