= Svilen =

Svilen (Bulgarian: Свилен) is a male given name almost exclusively used in Bulgaria. The female equivalent is Svilena (Bulgarian: Свилена).

== Origin ==
The name Svilen, was taken from the Bulgarian word svila (Cyrillic: Свила) or silk. As a result, the name refers to silken, it maybe used in many senses as an adjective other than a name.

The word itself svila originated from Serbo-Croatian. The word is mentioned in the epic Serbian poem, The Maiden of Kossovo; the line reads Svilen kalpak. This may be translated as Silken Cap.

== Notable people with the name ==
- Svilen Neykov (born 1964), Bulgarian rower
- Svilen Noev (born 1975), Bulgarian singer-songwriter, bandleader of Ostava
- Svilen Piralkov (born 1975), Spanish water polo player
- Svilen Rusinov (born 1964), Bulgarian boxer
- Svilen Simeonov (born 1974), Bulgarian footballer
- Svilen Andreev (born 1988), Bulgarian photographer and graphic designer
- Svilen Kostadinov (born 1989), Bulgarian inventor and designer

== See also ==
- Svilengrad, Bulgarian town
