= Liu Xirong =

Chinese rower

Personal information
- Nationality: Chinese
- Born: 1 November 1969 (age 56)

Sport
- Sport: Rowing
Medal record
Women's rowing
Representing China
World Rowing Championships
Gold medal – first place	1993 Racice	Quadruple sculls
Silver medal – second place	1989 Bled	Coxless four
Silver medal – second place	1994 Indianapolis	Quadruple sculls
Asian Games
Gold medal – first place	1990 Beijing	Coxless pair
Gold medal – first place	1994 Hiroshima	Coxless four
Summer Universiade
Bronze medal – third place	1989 Duisburg	Coxless four

Liu Xirong (born 1 November 1969) is a Chinese rower. She competed at the 1992 Summer Olympics and the 1996 Summer Olympics.
