= Víctor Llorente =

Spanish rower

Personal information
- Born: Víctor Llorente Rodriguez; 7 October 1962 (age 63)

Sport
- Sport: Rowing
Medal record
Men's rowing
Representing Spain
World Championships
Gold medal – first place	1983 Duisburg	Lwt eight
Bronze medal – third place	1984 Montreal	Lwt eight
Bronze medal – third place	1985 Hazewinkel	Lwt eight
Summer Universiade
Silver medal – second place	1989 Duisburg	Lwt coxless fours

Víctor Llorente Rodriguez (born 7 October 1962) is a Spanish lightweight rower. He won a gold medal at the 1983 World Rowing Championships in Duisburg with the lightweight men's eight.
