= Alberto Belgeri =

Italian rower

Sport
- Sport: Rowing
Medal record
Men's rowing
Representing Italy
World Rowing Championships
Gold medal – first place	1986 Nottingham	Double sculls
Summer Universiade
Silver medal – second place	1989 Duisburg	Double sculls

Alberto Belgeri is an Italian rower. He won a gold medal at the 1986 World Rowing Championships in Nottingham with the men's double sculls.
