= Rascher =

Rascher is a surname. Notable people with the surname include:

- Sigurd Raschèr (1907–2001), American saxophonist born in Germany
- Sigmund Rascher (1909–1945), German SS doctor
- Michael Rascher (born 1965), Canadian rower
- Horst Rascher (born 1940), German boxer
