= Kazuhisa =

- Gender: Male

Origin
- Origin: Japanese
- Meaning: Different meanings depending on the kanji used

Kazuhisa (written: 一久, 和久, 和寿 or 寿久) is a masculine Japanese given name. Notable people with the name include:

- Kazuhisa Hamaoka (濱岡 和久; born 1981), Japanese footballer
- Kazuhisa Hashimoto (橋本 和久; 1958–2020), Japanese video game developer
- Kazuhisa Iijima (飯島 寿久; born 1970), Japanese footballer
- Kazuhisa Inao (稲尾 和久; 1937–2007), Japanese baseball player
- Kazuhisa Irii (入井 和久; born 1970), Japanese footballer
- Kazuhisa Ishii (石井 一久; born 1973), Japanese baseball player
- Kazuhisa Kawahara (footballer) (河原 和寿; born 1987), Japanese footballer
- Kazuhisa Kono (河野 和久; born 1950), Japanese footballer
- Kazuhisa Makita (牧田 和久; born 1984), Japanese baseball player
- Kazuhisa Uchihashi (内橋 和久), Japanese guitarist
- Kazuhisa Watanabe (渡邉 一久; born 1983), Japanese boxer, kickboxer and mixed martial artist
- Kazuhisa Yamani (山児 和久; born 1970), Japanese rower

== See also ==
- 8582 Kazuhisa, a main-belt asteroid
