= Josu (name) =

Josu is a masculine given name which is mostly used in the Basque Country. It is also used as a surname. Notable people with the name include:

== Given name ==
- Josu Agirre (born 1981), Spanish cyclist
- Josu Andueza (born 1973), Spanish rower
- Josu Anuzita (born 1964), Spanish football player and manager
- Josu Erkoreka (born 1963), Spanish politician
- Josu Esnaola (born 1986), Spanish football player
- Josu Etxaniz (born 1985), Spanish football player
- Josu Etxeberria (born 2000), Spanish cyclist
- Josu Hernáez (born 1985), Spanish football player
- Josu Iriondo (born 1938), Spanish-born American prelate of the Roman Catholic Church
- Josu Jon Imaz (born 1963), Spanish Basque politician
- Josu Larrazabal (born 1981), Spanish cyclist
- Josu Muguruza (1958–1989), Spanish Basque journalist and politician
- Josu Ortuondo (born 1951), Spanish football player
- Josu Ortuondo Larrea (born 1948), Spanish Basque politician
- Josu Sarriegi (born 1979), Spanish football player
- Josu de Solaun Soto (born 1981), Spanish-American classical music pianist
- Josu Uribe (born 1969), Spanish football manager
- Josu Urrutia (born 1968), Spanish football player
- Josu Urrutikoetxea (born 1950), Spanish Basque activist and politician
- Josu Zabala (born 1993), Spanish cyclist

== Surname ==
- Nina Josu (born 1953), Moldovan writer and activist

== See also ==
- Josu (born 1993), Josué Prieto Currais, Spanish football full-back
