= Daniela Oronova =

Bulgarian rower

Personal information
- Nationality: Bulgarian
- Born: 6 April 1965 (age 61) Sofia, Bulgaria

Sport
- Sport: Rowing
Medal record
Representing Bulgaria
World Championships
Bronze medal – third place	1987 Copenhagen	Coxed fours
Bronze medal – third place	1993 Racice	Double sculls
Summer Universiade
Gold medal – first place	1989 Duisburg	Quadruple sculls

Daniela Georgieva Oronova (Bulgarian: Даниела Оронова; born 6 April 1965) is a Bulgarian rower. She competed at the 1988 Summer Olympics, 1992 Summer Olympics and the 1996 Summer Olympics.
