= David Colvin =

David Colvin may refer to:

- D. Leigh Colvin (1880–1959), American politician
- David Colvin (rower) (born 1965), Australian rowing coxswain and coach
