= John Parker (rower) =

American artist (born 1967)

- Also known as: jengizkhan, earcon, St Celfer
- Born: September 19, 1967 (age 58); New York City, United States
- Genres: Experimental, Electronic
- Years active: 1998–present

John MacDougall Parker (born September 19, 1967) is an American artist and avant-garde experimental electronic musician from New York City who had a career as an Olympic rower, coach, and director of national training centers. His music incorporates extreme timbres within the experimental genre. Much of his work is sound art, with elements of traditional music. As a visual artist and musician, his exhibitions and performances took place approximately four or five times a year during his active periods of 1998–2008 and after 2019.

== Education ==
He obtained a Bachelor's Degree in History at Princeton University in 1989. In 1994 he started a Bachelor of Fine Arts at the University of Washington. He gained entrance to the University of Pennsylvania and received a Master of Fine Arts degree in painting in 2001.

== Sporting career ==
Between 1981 and 2020, John Parker had an international career in rowing, competing at the Olympic level and serving in various roles including assistant coach, head coach, and director of national training centers, sometimes concurrently.

=== Rower (1981–1993) ===
He was a three-year stroke of the Princeton varsity heavyweight crew and prior to that a Groton School oarsman including captain in his senior year. An Eastern Sprints medalist, he also earned two gold medals at Canadian Henley with the Potomac Boat Club while attending Princeton, and rowed on the U.S. Pre-Elite Team. In 1989, Parker was named to the U.S. National Team. He rowed in heavyweight eight, four, and pair winning national and international medals. In 1992, he stroked the U.S. men's heavyweight eight to a fourth place finish at the Olympic Games in Barcelona.

=== Rowing coach ===
==== Beginning as assistant coach (1990–1993), university coach (1993–1999) ====
After a brief stint as the middle school coach at Belmont Hill School, he began coaching in 1990, as men's freshman lightweight coach at Princeton, his alma mater. Under his guidance, the Tigers captured several Eastern Sprints medals, including a gold in the first freshman eights race in 1993. They also won three consecutive second freshman titles. In 1993–1999, he was named freshman coach and recruiting coordinator at the University of Washington. Parker's eight won the IRA in 1997 completing a historic sweep for UW, a first since 1950, was second in 1998, and took three Pacific Coast championships in total over his tenure.

==== USRowing assistant coach (1997–1999, 2005–2007) and Columbia University assistant coach (2005) ====
1998–99, during the summers, he assisted head coach Mike Teti with the US National Team, which won two world championship gold medals with the heavyweight eight and one with the Men's coxed pair. In 2004–2005 returning to coaching after a full time exhibiting art career, John Parker was named the assistant men's lightweight coach at Columbia. His crews completed a historic sweep of Harvard during the season, both winning championship medals at the Eastern Sprints.

=== Head coach and management positions ===
==== Head coach (2006–2009) ====
While coaching the national team, Parker took the reins of the Rutgers lightweight rowing team as they tried to keep Varsity status at the University. They won the Durand Cup against Dartmouth and Yale for the first time since 1978. After joining USRowing's coaching staff full-time in June 2007 as a men's assistant coach, overseeing the lightweight men's team, he became the USRowing Lightweight Head Coach.

==== National high performance center director (2009–2013) ====
From 2009 to 2011, John Parker was named the director and head coach of the Oklahoma City National High Performance Center. In conjunction with USRowing and the Oklahoma City Boathouse Foundation. 2012–2013 Parker was named Co-Director of Rowing Talent Center, Rotterdam, NL.

==== Turkish national coach (2013) ====
In 2013 he was a coach at Fenerbahçe and a Turkish national coach.

==== Head coach at Vesper Boat Club (2014–2016) ====
From 2014 to 2016 Parker was the head coach at Vesper Boat Club, where he brought them back to the Olympics in 2016, representing the United States for the first time as the club since 1960.

==== World Rowing development coach (2013–2020) ====
From 2013 to 2022 Parker served World Rowing as a development coach in addition to his coaching positions becoming more active from 2017 to 2020 when he was coaching in Egypt as the Covid Pandemic hit that year. Before that, he helped introduce the new sport of Coastal Rowing to America Samoa. From 2017 to 2019 he worked to build rowing in Jamaica. While coaching at Vesper he coached Nigeria's 1st Olympic rower including her qualification in 2015.

== Visual artist career ==
=== Eyekhan (1999–2008) / Gnitcelfer (2007–2017) ===
Eyekhan was a pseudonym for John Parker while he lived in New York from 1999 to 2008. As gnitcelfer, (the same as gnitcelfer.reflecting), he was documenting ideas on gnitcelfer.blogspot.com and reflecting on his art career anticipating new work from 2008 to 2018. In 1999 he relocated to Brooklyn and showed installations applying painting's ideas of plasticity to everyday inexpensive objects (Gleaned Detritus Project). Adding an interactive element, he followed the same approach in the medium of sound (Listeners).

John Parker's visual work is in numerous private collections and since 2019 two drawings entered the permanent collection of MAC USP – Museu de Arte Contemporânea da Universidade de São Paulo.

== Musician career ==
=== Taint (2001–2003), DJ in Spongeworthy ===
Parker began his music career DJing in the band Spongeworthy under the name DJ Taint. He played Korg Electribes and an American Audio CD Scratcher with Richard Douglas (Heinsohn) who played guitar and sang. They played, without rehearsal, 19 live performances. The songs were similar in style to Southern rock, but John was inclined to experiment with sounds.

=== Jenghizkhan (2001–2022) ===
The manifestation of the more artistic and experimental side of John M. Parker happened as 'jenghizkhan' on an Apple Powerbook G3 laptop and a DAT recorder with field microphone. Starting with sculptures that amplified the sound, he took part in DJ Spooky's CMJ Music Festival performance in 2001 and then later showed at Fluxfactory, the Bronx River Art Center, and vertexList.

He composed "the noise of experiments: bits & pieces" among other works. He played Remote Lounge, The Kitchen as part of Share, Tonic, Galapagos Art Space, Sputnik, Stinger Club and, with other groups, The Tank and CBGBs.

Tom Moody (artist) listed a live recording, made with a monomachine and circuit-bent Casio SK-1 at Front Room, Brooklyn as one of his notable picks of 2005 on his blog.

He collaborated with Denim Venom (Bill Mattinson) [2001–2003] and He Goatan (formerly !M.O.O.B.) (Marc Peckham, Cave Precise, Pat Mason) [2002–2004].

=== Earcon (2004–2013) and Earcon as "Man From Planet Risk" (2004–2006) ===
Between solo experiments he made a more mainstream album as "Man From Planet Risk" in a collaboration with a hip hop producer from New York, Cave Precise, AKA Ron Ramey. He used a Powerbook G4 with eMagic Logic. It was recorded at WhitesAreGonnaBurn Sound (Cave Precise) and Eyekhan Laboratories (jenghizkhan) and was mixed and Mastered at Silver Trashcan Studios by Hiroyuki Sanada.

Earcon was influenced by John Parker's time in Man From Planet Risk and was less experimental than jenghizkhan. Earcon uses beatboxes, specifically the Elektron Monomachine where he was a beta-tester and owns instrument serial number 00001. His idea was to push the limits of machines attempting to crash them while also avoiding looping. This concept informed his later work as St Celfer.

=== Collaboration with Tom Moody (2004–2022) ===
On April 24, 2004, Tom Moody went to vertexList, Brooklyn, and saw a performance by jenghizkhan (John M. Parker). Later he also reviewed 'Man From Planet Risk' and John's show at the Front Room which was named 'best of 2004'. After conducting an interview in 2006 they collaborated for 'Mods and Rockers' at the Toronto Harbourfront center in Canada. That work led to Scratch Ambulance in 2007 which was earcon (John M. Parker) remixing Tom's first tracks made on an Apple SE from the late 1980s. After John left New York, they continued to collaborate on small projects or single tracks until St Celfer and Tom Moody, "eleven tracks" (collaborative LP) release on bandcamp. This was followed by a show in ICOSA, Austin, TX and a second interview in 2020 during the peak of the pandemic. Tom died shortly afterwards.

=== St Celfer and Space Between Points and Step.4D instruments (2016 – present) ===
John MacDougall Parker's first project as "St Celfer" was Space Between Points. Space Between Points distributes 16 sound sources across the 8 corners of a square space. The compositions in Suites #1–9 are described as asynchronous and non-metric in structure

Another project was named Step.4D and still continues as of 2023. Transitioning from an in-studio process of the "Suites", St Celfer's energies have gone into the interface between man and machine. He built a homemade instrument described using the Brazilian Portuguese term "gambiarra" mounted on a single mic stand with interconnected gear designed for live performance. The Step.4D combines and layers signals from multiple sources.

Step.4D is the original and largest device that includes a theremin. It is meant to be played live so the only looping that occurs is on two turntables or via a guitar pedal. Step.4D² is the second machine that contains all unsynced looping devices that need to be initiated live (no presets). Step.4D.bkwrd.E is the third device that is portable for travel as was the Step.DDDD, the fourth and last device.

He was selected five times as "new and notable" by Bandcamp editors in 2021, 2022, 2023, 2024 and 2026 and was the featured track on Wave #7 at Infrasonica.org.
