= Terrence Paul =

Canadian rower

Personal information
- Born: September 14, 1964 (age 62) Oakville, Ontario, Canada

Sport
- Sport: Rowing
Medal record
Representing Canada
Olympic Games
Gold medal – first place	1992 Barcelona	Eight
World Championships
Silver medal – second place	1990 Tasmania	Eight
Silver medal – second place	1991 Vienna	Eight
Summer Universiade
Bronze medal – third place	1987 Zagreb	Coxed fours

Terrence Michael "Terry" Paul (born September 14, 1964) is a retired rowing coxswain from Canada. He competed in two consecutive Summer Olympics for his native country, starting in 1988. At his second appearance he was the Coxswain of the team that won the gold medal in the Men's Eights.

Paul has gone on to an extensive coach career in the US College system at Cornell, and then internationally with Canada, Switzerland, and then Canada again. More recently, he was the coach of the Canadian Men's Pair of Dave Calder and Scott Frandsen at the 2008 Summer Olympics. Paul coached the crew to an Olympic Silver Medal.

== Trivia ==
Paul accompanied the filming of the Netflix series Crew Girl and helped the cast with their rowing practice.
