= Matthew Collins (rower) =

American lightweight rower

Personal information
- Born: May 22, 1967 (age 59)
- Education: University of Massachusetts, Amherst
- Occupation: Physician
- Spouse: Christine S Collins

Sport
- Sport: Rowing
Medal record
Men's rowing
Representing United States
World Rowing Championships
Gold medal – first place	1993 Račice	Lwt men's four

Matthew Collins (born May 22, 1967) is an American lightweight rower. He won a gold medal at the 1993 World Rowing Championships in Račice with the lightweight men's four.
