= Robert Fontaine (rower) =

Canadian rower

Personal information
- Born: Ottawa, Ontario, Canada

Sport
- Sport: Rowing
Medal record
Men's rowing
Representing Canada
World Rowing Championships
Gold medal – first place	1993 Račice	Lwt eight
Summer Universiade
Bronze medal – third place	1993 Buffalo	Lwt coxless fours
Pan American Games
Silver medal – second place	1995 Mar del Plata	Lwt coxless pairs
Silver medal – second place	1995 Mar del Plata	Lwt coxless fours

Robert Fontaine is a Canadian lightweight rower. He won a gold medal at the 1993 World Rowing Championships in Račice with the lightweight men's eight.
