= Carlos Front =

Spanish rower

Personal information
- Full name: Carlos Bienvenido Front Barrera
- Nationality: Spanish
- Born: 20 November 1980 (age 44); Amposta, Catalonia, Spain

Sport
- Sport: Rowing

Carlos Bienvenido Front Barrera (born 20 November 1980) is a Spanish rower. He competed in the men's eight event at the 1992 Summer Olympics as part of the Spanish team that finished 14th.
