= Michael Forgeron =

Canadian rower

Mike Forgeron
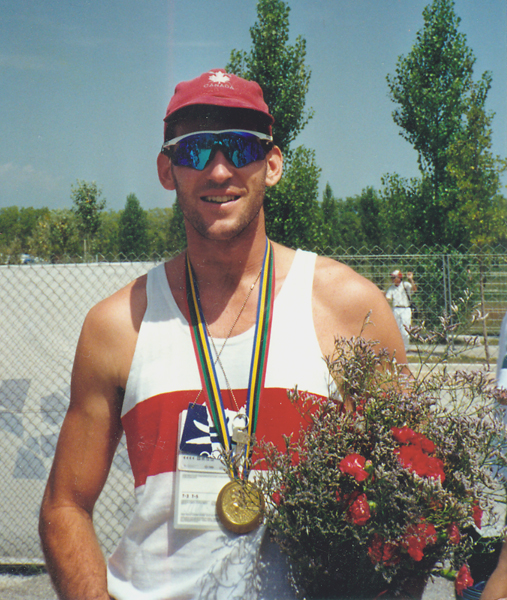
- Forgeron after winning gold in 1992

Personal information
- Full name: Michael Joseph Forgeron
- Born: 24 January 1966 (age 60) Main-à-Dieu, Nova Scotia, Canada
- Height: 6 ft 6 in (198 cm)
- Weight: 216 lb (98 kg)
Medal record
Men's rowing
Representing Canada
Olympic Games
Gold medal – first place	1992 Barcelona	Eight
Pan American Games
Silver medal – second place	1991 Havana	Coxless apirs
Bronze medal – third place	1991 Havana	Eights
Summer Universiade
Silver medal – second place	1993 Buffalo	Quadruple sculls

Michael Joseph "Mike" Forgeron (born 24 January 1966, in Main-à-Dieu, Nova Scotia) is a rower from Canada. He competed at two consecutive Summer Olympics, starting in 1992. At his debut, he was a member of the team that won the gold medal in the Men's Eights (3 seat) making Forgeron the first Olympic Gold Medalist in Atlantic Canada. In the 1996 Olympics, he competed in the Men's Double Sculls. Forgeron was also in the Pan Am Games in a coxed pair straight six (stroke) earning a bronze medal along with a pair earning a silver medal.
