= Peter Murphy (rower) =

Australian rower (born 1967)

Personal information
- Nationality: Australian
- Born: 10 August 1967 (age 57)

Sport
- Sport: Rowing

Peter Murphy (born 10 August 1967) is an Australian rower. He competed in the men's eight event at the 1992 Summer Olympics.
