= Vasile Măstăcan =

Romanian rower

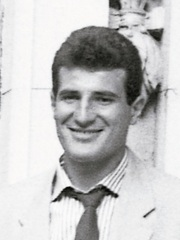

Personal information
- Born: 5 November 1968 (age 57) Podu Turcului, Romania
- Height: 193 cm (6 ft 4 in)
- Weight: 93 kg (205 lb)

Sport
- Sport: Rowing
Medal record
Representing Romania
Olympic Games
Silver medal – second place	1992 Barcelona	Eight
World Rowing Championships
Silver medal – second place	1993 Račice	Eight
Bronze medal – third place	1999 St. Catharines	Coxed four
Silver medal – second place	2000 Zagreb	Coxed pair
Gold medal – first place	2001 Lucerne	Eight

Vasile Ionel Măstăcan (born 5 November 1968) is a retired Romanian rower who competed at the 1992, 1996 and 2000 Olympics. He had his best achievements in the eights, winning an Olympic silver medal in 1992 and the world title in 2001.
