= Robert Marland =

Canadian rower (born 1964)

Personal information
- Born: 13 May 1964 (age 62) Mississauga, Ontario, Canada

Sport
- Sport: Rowing
Medal record
Representing Canada
Olympic Games
Gold medal – first place	1992 Barcelona	Eight
World Championships
Silver medal – second place	1990 Tasmania	Eight
Silver medal – second place	1991 Vienna	Eight
Summer Universiade
Bronze medal – third place	1987 Zagreb	Coxed four

Robert Davies Marland (born 13 May 1964) is a retired rower from Canada. He competed in two consecutive Summer Olympics for his native country, starting in 1988. At his second appearance, he was a member of the team that won the gold medal in the men's eight.

Currently, Marland lives and works in Ottawa, Ontario for Royal LePage, a Canadian real estate franchiser. Rob is one of Canada's most successful realtors and his focus on delivering results has placed Rob among the top one percent of Royal LePage realtors in Canada, earning him the National Chairman's Club Award.

He holds a B.A. in Economics from Trent University. He has also completed Real Estate Phase I, II & III, Real Estate Law, and Appraisal from the Ontario Real Estate Association.

Marland is married to Jane Forsyth. Together, they have three daughters, Kate, Annie, and Molly.
