= Rob Shepherd =

American rower

Personal information
- Nationality: American
- Born: April 19, 1965 (age 61) Fresno, California, United States

Sport
- Sport: Rowing

Rob Shepherd (born April 19, 1965) is an American rower. He competed in the men's eight event at the 1992 Summer Olympics.
