= Zhong Aifang =

Chinese rower

Sport
- Sport: Rowing
Medal record
Representing China
World Championships
Gold medal – first place	1996 Motherwell	Lwt coxless four
Silver medal – second place	1994 Indianapolis	Lwt double sculls
Summer Universiade
Gold medal – first place	1993 Buffalo	Lwt coxless pairs
Asian Games
Gold medal – first place	1994 Hiroshima	Lwt double sculls
Gold medal – first place	1994 Hiroshima	Lwt coxless four

Zhong Aifang is a Chinese lightweight rower.

At the 1992 World Rowing Championships, she came fourth in the lightweight four. At the 1994 World Rowing Championships, she won silver in the double sculls. At the 1996 World Rowing Championships, she won gold in the lightweight four.
