= Simon Spriggs =

Australian rower

Simon David Spriggs
Personal information
- Nationality: Australian
- Born: 13 November 1968 (age 56)

Sport
- Sport: Rowing

Simon David Spriggs (born 13 November 1968) is an Australian rower. He competed in the men's eight event at the 1992 Summer Olympics.
