= Garikoitz Azkue =

Spanish rower

Personal information
- Full name: Garikoitz Azkue Laso
- Nationality: Spanish
- Born: 13 April 1972 (age 54) San Sebastián, Basque Country, Spain

Sport
- Sport: Rowing
- Club: Ur-Kirolak; Donostiarra
Medal record
Nations Cup
Bronze medal – third place	1992 Strathclyde	Eight
World Junior Rowing Championships
Bronze medal – third place	1991 Banyoles	Eight

Garikoitz Azkue Laso (born 13 April 1972) is a Spanish rower. He competed in the men's eight event at the 1992 Summer Olympics.
