= Simon Cox (rower) =

British lightweight rower

Personal information
- Born: 12 May 1970 (age 56)
- Education: University of London

Sport
- Sport: Rowing
Medal record
Men's rowing
Representing Great Britain
World Rowing Championships
Gold medal – first place	1994 Indianapolis	Lwt eight
Summer Universiade
Silver medal – second place	1993 Buffalo	Lwt coxless fours

Simon Cox (born 12 May 1970) is a British lightweight rower. He won a gold medal at the 1994 World Rowing Championships in Indianapolis with the lightweight men's eight.
