= Armin Eichholz =

German rower (born 1964)

Personal information
- Born: 21 May 1964 (age 62) Duisburg, West Germany
- Height: 2.04 m (6 ft 8 in)
- Weight: 97 kg (214 lb)

Sport
- Sport: Rowing
- Club: Rudernverein Blankenstein
Medal record
Representing West Germany
Olympic Games
Gold medal – first place	1988 Seoul	Eight
Representing Germany
Olympic Games
Bronze medal – third place	1992 Barcelona	Eight
World Championships
Gold medal – first place	1991 Vienna	Coxed four

Armin Eichholz (born 21 May 1964) is a power plant manager and former competition rower from West Germany.

== Sports career ==
Eichholz won two Olympic medals in the eight event: a gold in 1988 and a bronze in 1992, and in 1991 he won a world title in the coxed fours.

== Business career ==
Eichholz was educated as mechanical engineer. He has had a career as power plant manager, including for the Niederaussem Power Station.
