= Bahne Rabe =

West German rower

Personal information
- Born: 7 August 1963 Lüneburg, Lower Saxony, West Germany
- Died: 5 August 2001 (aged 37) Kiel, Germany
- Height: 2.03 m (6 ft 8 in)
- Weight: 95 kg (209 lb)

Sport
- Sport: Rowing
- Club: Ruderclub Hansa, Dortmund
Medal record
Representing West Germany
Olympic Games
| Gold medal – first place | 1988 Seoul | Eight |
Representing Germany
Olympic Games
| Bronze medal – third place | 1992 Barcelona | Eight |
World Championships
| Gold medal – first place | 1991 Vienna | Coxed four |

Bahne Rabe (7 August 1963 – 5 August 2001) was a competition rower from West Germany. He won two Olympic medals in the eight event: a gold in 1988 and a bronze in 1992, and in 1991 he won a world title in the coxed fours.

After retiring in 1995, Rabe had difficulties in maintaining his daily balance. He became anorexic, losing about 40 kg by 2001. He died of pneumonia on 5 August 2001, after having been admitted to hospital in critical condition due to extreme malnutrition.
