= Jørgen Tramm =

Danish rower (born 1965)

Personal information
- Nationality: Danish
- Born: 27 April 1965 (age 61) Esbjerg, Denmark

Sport
- Sport: Rowing

Jørgen Tramm (born 27 April 1965) is a Danish rower. He competed in the men's eight event at the 1992 Summer Olympics.
