= Cornel Nemțoc =

Romanian rower

Personal information
- Born: 8 February 1974 (age 52) Rădăuți, Romania

Sport
- Sport: Rowing
Medal record
Representing Romania
World Rowing Championships
Gold medal – first place	2001 Lucerne	M8+
Silver medal – second place	1993 Račice	M8+
Silver medal – second place	1997 Aiguebelette	M8+
Bronze medal – third place	1994 Indianapolis	M8+
Bronze medal – third place	1997 Aiguebelette	M4-
Bronze medal – third place	1998 Cologne	M8+
Bronze medal – third place	2001 Lucerne	M2+
Summer Universiade
Gold medal – first place	1993 Buffalo	M4+

Cristinel Cornel Nemţoc (born 8 February 1974) is a Romanian rower. He competed at the 1996 and 2000 Summer Olympics.
