= Giovanni Suarez =

Italian rower

Personal information
- Full name: Giovanni Marco Suarez
- Nationality: Italian
- Born: 20 February 1963 (age 63) London, England

Sport
- Sport: Rowing
Medal record
Representing Italy
World Rowing Championships
Silver medal – second place	1985 Hazewinkel	Coxed fours
Bronze medal – third place	1987 Copenhagen	Coxed fours
Summer Universiade
Gold medal – first place	1989 Duisburg	Eights
Silver medal – second place	1987 Zagreb	Coxed fours

Giovanni Marco Suarez (born 20 February 1963) is an Italian rower. He competed at the 1984 Summer Olympics, 1988 Summer Olympics and the 1992 Summer Olympics.
