= Roland Baar =

German rower (1965–2018)

Personal information
- Born: 12 April 1965 Osterholz-Scharmbeck, West Germany
- Died: 23 June 2018 (aged 53) Velpke, Germany
Medal record
Men's rowing
Representing West Germany
World Championships
Gold medal – first place	1989 Bled	M8+
Gold medal – first place	1990 Tasmania	M8+
Representing Germany
Olympic Games
Silver medal – second place	1996 Atlanta	Eight
Bronze medal – third place	1992 Barcelona	Eight
World Championships
Gold medal – first place	1991 Vienna	M8+
Gold medal – first place	1993 Račice	M8+
Gold medal – first place	1995 Tampere	M8+

Roland Baar (German pronunciation: [ˈʁoːlant ˈbaːɐ̯]; 12 April 1965 – 23 June 2018) was a German rower who competed for his nation at several Olympic Games. After retiring from the sport in 1996, he received the Thomas Keller Medal in 1998. He served on the Athletes' Commission of the International Olympic Committee between 1999 and 2004.

Baar was killed in a car crash in June 2018.
