= Andrew Gordon-Brown =

South African rower

Personal information
- Nationality: South African
- Born: 5 April 1967 (age 59)

Sport
- Sport: Rowing

Andrew Gordon-Brown (born 5 April 1967) is a South African rower and school administrator who has been headmaster of Kingswood School in Bath, England, since 2020.

== Education and rowing career ==
Gordon-Brown was educated at Hyde Park High School in Johannesburg before studying at the University of Cape Town and Keble College, Oxford.

He competed in the men's eight rowing event at the 1992 Summer Olympics.

== Teaching career ==
After a career as a media analyst for J.P. Morgan in England, Gordon-Brown began a second career as an educator, teaching first at Radley College before serving as pastoral deputy head at Stonyhurst. From 2013 to 2020 he was headmaster of Truro School, and has been headmaster of Kingswood School since 2020.

== Personal life ==
As well as rowing, Gordon-Brown's interests include singing. He is married with three children.
