= Igor Shkaberin =

Soviet rower

Personal information
- Nationality: Soviet
- Born: 2 March 1963 (age 62)

Sport
- Sport: Rowing

Igor Shkaberin (born 2 March 1963) is a Soviet rower. He competed in the men's eight event at the 1992 Summer Olympics.
