= José María Claro =

Spanish rower

Personal information
- Full name: José María Claro Gómez
- Nationality: Spanish
- Born: 25 September 1970 (age 54)

Sport
- Sport: Rowing

José María Claro Gómez (born 25 September 1970) is a Spanish rower. He competed in the men's eight event at the 1992 Summer Olympics.
