= Aleksandr Anikeyev =

Soviet rower

Personal information
- Nationality: Soviet
- Born: 4 August 1967 (age 57)

Sport
- Sport: Rowing

Aleksandr Anikeyev (born 4 August 1967) is a Soviet rower. He competed in the men's eight event at the 1992 Summer Olympics.
