= Ivan Pentz =

South African rower

Personal information
- Nationality: South African
- Born: 18 January 1957 (age 68)

Sport
- Sport: Rowing

Ivan Pentz (born 18 January 1957) is a South African rower. He competed in the men's eight event at the 1992 Summer Olympics.
