= Chris Sahs =

American rower

Personal information
- Full name: Christian D. Sahs
- Born: July 9, 1970 (age 56) Madison, Wisconsin, United States

Sport
- Sport: Rowing

Chris Sahs (born July 9, 1970) is an American rower. He competed in the men's eight event at the 1992 Summer Olympics.
