= John Wallace (rower) =

Canadian rower (born 1962)

Medal record

Men's rowing

Representing Canada

Olympic Games
Gold medal – first place	1992 Barcelona	Eight

John William Wallace (born 1 April 1962 in Burlington, Ontario) is a retired rower from Canada.

== Career ==
He competed in two consecutive Summer Olympics for his native country, starting in 1988.

At his second appearance, he was a member of the team that won the gold medal in the Men's Eights. He was once married to fellow rower Silken Laumann, and he is brother-in-law to Daniele Laumann.
