= Andrew Crosby =

Canadian rower

Medal record

Men's rowing

Representing Canada

Olympic Games
Gold medal – first place	1992 Barcelona	Eight

DrAndrew "Andy" Crosby' (born 5 November 1965 in Bella Coola, British Columbia) is a retired rower from Canada. He competed in three consecutive Summer Olympics for his native country, starting in 1988. In 1992, he was a member of the team that won the gold medal in the Men's Eights.
