= Andreu Canals =

Spanish rower

Personal information
- Full name: Andreu Canals Butcher
- Nationality: Spanish
- Born: 10 February 1973 (age 52); Toledo, Spain

Sport
- Sport: Rowing

Andreu Canals Butcher (born 10 February 1973) is a Spanish rower. He competed in the men's eight event at the 1992 Summer Olympics.
