= Ondřej Holeček =

Czech rower

Personal information
- Nationality: Czech
- Born: 14 October 1973 (age 51); Prague, Czechoslovakia

Sport
- Sport: Rowing

Ondřej Holeček (born 14 October 1973) is a Czech rower. He competed in the men's eight event at the 1992 Summer Olympics.
