= Manfred Klein =

German rower (born 1947)

Personal information
- Nickname: Willi
- Born: 22 August 1947 (age 78) Berlin
- Height: 170 cm (5 ft 7 in)
- Weight: 50 kg (110 lb)

Sport
- Club: RC Tegel
Medal record
Men's rowing
Representing West Germany
Olympic Games
Gold medal – first place	1988 Seoul	Eight
World Championships
Gold medal – first place	1990 Tasmania	Eight
Representing Germany
Olympic Games
Bronze medal – third place	1992 Barcelona	Eight
World Championships
Gold medal – first place	1991 Vienna	Eight

Manfred Klein (born 22 August 1947 in Berlin) is a competition rower and Olympic champion for West Germany.

Klein coxed the eight which won the gold medal at the 1988 Summer Olympics in Seoul. He received a bronze medal in 1992, where he was the flagbearer for the newly reunified German team.
