= Hans Sennewald =

German rower

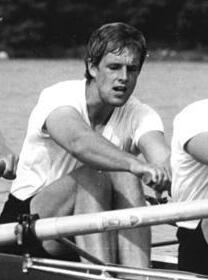
- Hans Sennewald (1982)

Personal information
- Born: 12 September 1961 (age 64) Heckelberg, East Germany
- Height: 2.02 m (6 ft 8 in)
- Weight: 96 kg (212 lb)

Sport
- Sport: Rowing
- Club: ORC 1956, Rostock
Medal record
Olympic Games
Representing Germany
Bronze medal – third place	1992 Barcelona	Eight
Friendship Games
Representing East Germany
Silver medal – second place	1984 Moscow	Eight
World Rowing Championships
Representing East Germany
Gold medal – first place	1982 Lucerne	Coxed four
Silver medal – second place	1987 Copenhagen	Eight
Silver medal – second place	1989 Bled	Eight
Bronze medal – third place	1985 Hazewinkel	Coxless four
Bronze medal – third place	1990 Tasmania	Eight
Representing Germany
Silver medal – second place	1993 Račice	Coxless pair

Hans Sennewald (born 12 September 1961) is a retired German rower who won a bronze medal in the eights event at the 1992 Summer Olympics. He also won six medals in various events at the world championships of 1982–1993.

His daughter Ulrike also became an Olympic rower.
