= Riccardo Moretti (rower) =

Italian rower

Personal information
- Nationality: Italian
- Born: 22 September 1967 (age 57); Sabaudia, Italy

Sport
- Sport: Rowing

Riccardo Moretti (born 22 September 1967) is an Italian former rower. He competed in the men's eight event at the 1992 Summer Olympics.
