= Rowing at the 1989 Summer Universiade =

Rowing regatta

Rowing at the XV Summer Universiade
- Venue: Duisburg, West Germany

Rowing was contested at the 1989 Summer Universiade in Duisburg in West Germany.

== Medal summary ==
=== Medal table ===
Rank	Nation	Gold	Silver	Bronze	Total
1	Romania	4	0	0	4
2	China	2	2	1	5
2	West Germany	2	2	1	5
4	Soviet Union	2	2	0	4
5	Bulgaria	2	0	0	2
6	Italy	1	1	0	2
7	United States	0	2	2	4
8	Canada	0	2	1	3
8	Spain	0	2	1	3
10	Great Britain	0	0	2	2
11	East Germany	0	0	1	1
11	France	0	0	1	1
11	Greece	0	0	1	1
11	Netherlands	0	0	1	1
11	Poland	0	0	1	1
Totals (15 entries)		13	13	13	39

=== Men's events ===
Event	Gold	Silver	Bronze
Single sculls	Igor Antonov; Soviet Union	Allen Green; United States	Anton Obholzer; Great Britain
Double sculls	Soviet Union (URS); Dmitriy Grechenko; Leonid Shaposhnikov	Italy (ITA); Alberto Belgeri; Roberto Fusaro	Greece (GRE); Konstantinos Ditsios; Pantelis Papaterpos
Lightweight single sculls	Svilen Neykov; Bulgaria	John Murphy; Canada	José María de Marco Pérez; Spain
Lightweight quadruple sculls	China (CHN); Fang Shangiang; Shen Hongfei; Xia Jianmin; Xie Yifan	Spain (ESP); Alberto Hernández; Alfonso Muniesa; Raimundo Piera; José Antonio Sánchez	United States (USA); Charles Engemann; Ken Green; Steve Peterson; William Phelps
Lightweight coxless four	West Germany (FRG); Robert Bauer; Michael Kobor; Wolfgang Stöcker; Tobias Wittek	Spain (ESP); Juan Aguirre; Juan María Altuna; Víctor Llorente; Mikel Eguren	France (FRA); Patrice Balmain; Fabrice Camus; Benoît Masson; Marc Vazart
Coxless pair	Romania (ROU); Dragoș Neagu; Ioan Snep	West Germany (FRG); Gunther Sack; Frank Richter	Canada (CAN); Derek Porter; Ian Swan
Coxed four	Romania (ROU); Vasile Năstase; Vasile Tomoiagă; Valentin Robu; Dimitrie Popescu; Florin Micu	West Germany (FRG); Heiko Barthold; Stefan Wilk; Andreas Hebbel; Andreas Huber; Thomas Alt	Netherlands (NED); Rutger Arisz; Chris van Boetzelaer; Fred Huijtink; Pieter Lubbert; Jeroen Duyster
Eight	Italy (ITA); Giuseppe Carando; Ciro Liguori; Massimo Marconcini; Palampa; Daniele Panicucci; Rocco Pecoraro; Giovanni Suarez; Franco Zucchi; Marco Benvenuti	Soviet Union (URS); Stepan Dmitriyevsky; Oleg Akulov; Sergei Korotkich; Yevgeny Kislyakov; Kovalenko; Stankevich; Sassazov; Bossilin; Gusev	West Germany (FRG); Lange; Schäfer; Armin Weyrauch; Hahn; Claas-Peter Fischer; Dirk Bangert; Stefan Scholz; Wecker; Thomas Alt

=== Women's events ===
Event	Gold	Silver	Bronze
Single sculls	Elisabeta Lipă; Romania	Zhang Li; China	Alison Gill; Great Britain
Quadruple sculls	Bulgaria (BUL); Galina Anakhrieva; Daniela Oronova; Krassimira Tokheva; Sneschana Jantscheva	Soviet Union (URS); Tatyana Borisova; Nataliya Grigoryeva; Elena Voroshilova; Nicole Yakutovish	East Germany (GDR); Jaqueline Bohlmann; Kerstin Förster; Kerstin Köppen; Claudia Krüger
Lightweight double sculls	China (CHN); Liang Sanmei; Zhang Huajie	United States (USA); Melania Meunier; Sanya Remmler	Poland (POL); Aleksandra Dzierzkowska; Elżbieta Pakizer
Coxless pair	West Germany (FRG); Bender; Sybille Schmidt	China (CHN); Zeng Meilan; Lin Zhiai	United States (USA); Sandy Kendall; Reynolds
Coxless four	Romania (ROU); Doina Bălan; Livia Leonte; Marioara Curelea; Viorica Ilica	Canada (CAN); Jennifer Walinga; Marnie McBean; Kirsten Barnes; Kathleen Heddle	China (CHN); Cao Mianying; Hu Yadong; Liu Xirong; Zhou Shouying
