= Oleg Sveshnikov =

Soviet rower

Personal information
- Nationality: Soviet
- Born: 1967 (age 57–58)

Sport
- Sport: Rowing

Oleg Sveshnikov (born 1967) is a Soviet rower. He competed in the men's eight event at the 1992 Summer Olympics.
