= Gabriel Marin =

Romanian rower

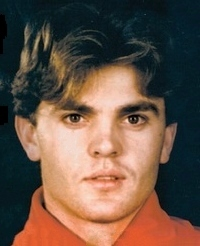

Personal information
- Born: 23 August 1972 (age 53) Munteni, Romania

Sport
- Sport: Rowing
- Club: Dinamo Bucharest
Medal record
Representing Romania
Olympic Games
Silver medal – second place	1992 Barcelona	Eight
World Rowing Championships
Gold medal – first place	1996 Strathclyde	Coxed four
Silver medal – second place	1997 Aiguebelette	Eight
Bronze medal – third place	1997 Aiguebelette	Coxless four

Claudiu Gabriel Marin (born 23 August 1972) is a retired Romanian rower. He competed at the 1992, 1996 and 2000 Olympics and won a silver medal in the eights in 1992. At the world championships he won a gold, a silver and a bronze medal in 1996–1997.
