= Andrew Lonmon-Davis =

South African rower

Personal information
- Nationality: South African
- Born: 13 September 1965 (age 59)

Sport
- Sport: Rowing

Andrew Lonmon-Davis (born 13 September 1965) is a South African rower. He competed in the men's eight event at the 1992 Summer Olympics.
