= Carlo Grande (rower) =

Italian rower

Medal record

Men's rowing

Representing Italy

World Rowing Championships
Gold medal – first place	1995 Tampere	LM2-
Gold medal – first place	2002 Seville	LM8+
Bronze medal – third place	1993 Račice	LM8+
Bronze medal – third place	1999 St. Catharines	LM8+

Carlo Grande (born 3 July 1974 in Syracuse, Sicily) is an Italian rower.
