= Michael Moore (rowing) =

American rower

Personal information
- Full name: Michael James Moore
- Nationality: American
- Born: August 21, 1970 (age 55) Philadelphia, Pennsylvania, United States

Sport
- Sport: Rowing

Michael James Moore (born August 21, 1970) is an American rowing coxswain. He competed in the men's eight event at the 1992 Summer Olympics.
