= Alexandru Britov =

Russian rower

Personal information
- Nationality: Soviet
- Born: 1964 (age 60–61)

Sport
- Sport: Rowing

Alexandru Britov (born 1964) is a Soviet rower. He competed in the men's eight event at the 1992 Summer Olympics.
