= Jan Beneš (rower) =

Czech rower

Personal information
- Nationality: Czech
- Born: 9 October 1971 (age 53)

Sport
- Sport: Rowing

Jan Beneš (born 9 October 1971) is a Czech rower. He competed in the men's eight event at the 1992 Summer Olympics.
