= Richard Phelps (rower) =

British rower

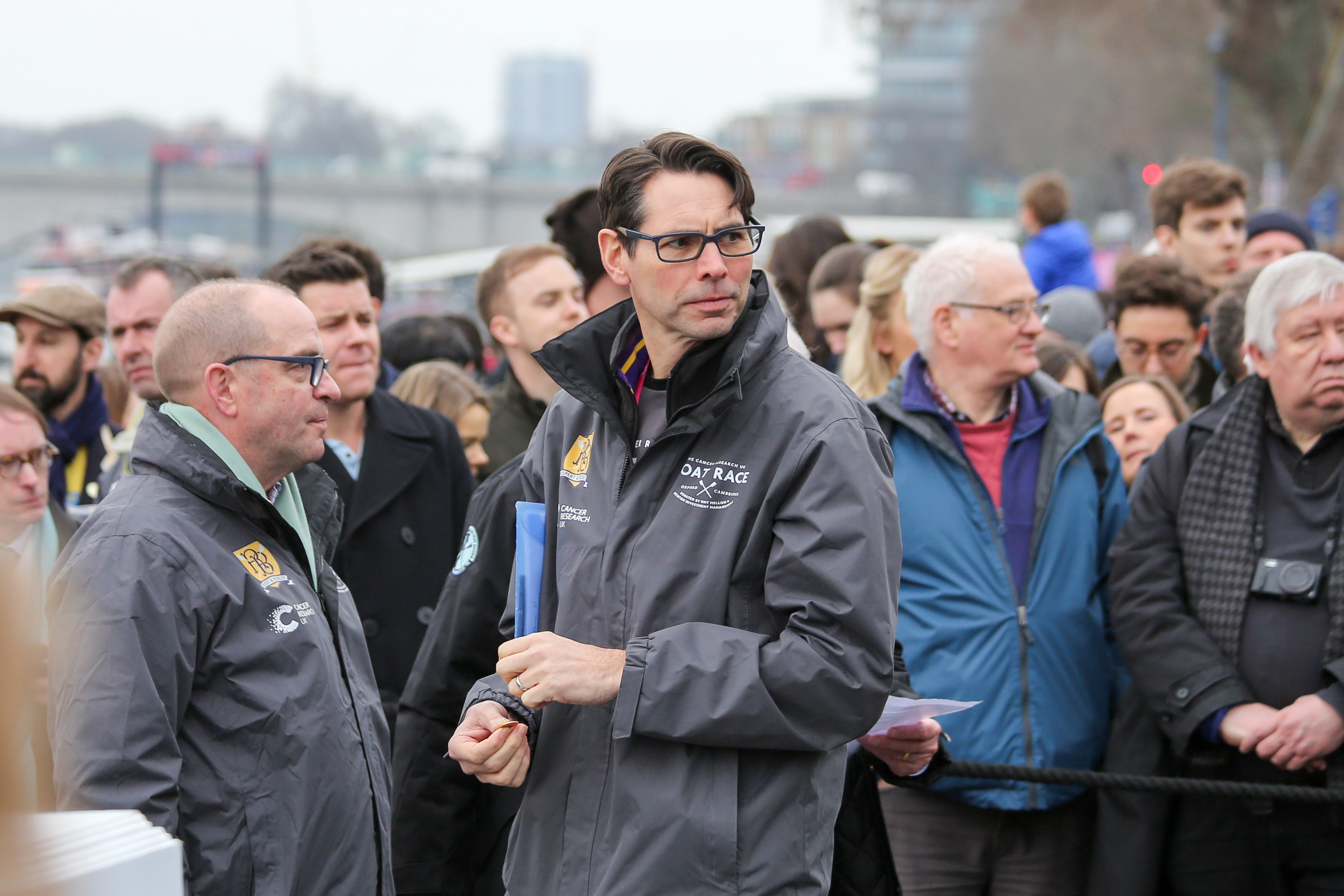
- Phelps at The Boat Race 2018

Personal information
- Nationality: British
- Born: 21 November 1965 (age 60) London, England

Sport
- Sport: Rowing
Medal record
Representing Great Britain
World Championships
Bronze medal – third place	1989 Bled	Eights
Bronze medal – third place	1991 Vienna	Eights
Summer Universiade
Silver medal – second place	1993 Buffalo	Eights

Richard Charles Phelps (born 21 November 1965) is a British former rower. He competed in the men's eight event at the 1992 Summer Olympics. He crewed for Cambridge in the 1993, 1994 and 1995 Boat Races and umpired the men‘s Boat Race in 2014 and 2019, the 2018 men's reserve race and the 2024 women‘s race.
