= Thomas Beetham =

American lightweight rower

Sport
- Sport: Rowing
Medal record
Men's rowing
Representing United States
World Rowing Championships
Gold medal – first place	1993 Račice	Lwt men's four

Thomas Beetham is an American lightweight rower. He won a gold medal at the 1993 World Rowing Championships in Račice with the lightweight men's four. The Swiss came in second.
