= Rogan Clarke =

South African rower

Personal information
- Nationality: South African
- Born: 28 April 1969 (age 55)

Sport
- Sport: Rowing

Rogan Clarke (born 28 April 1969) is a South African rower. He competed in the men's eight event at the 1992 Summer Olympics in Barcelona and came in 8th place.
