= Dorin Alupei =

Romanian rower

Personal information
- Nationality: Romanian
- Born: 24 February 1973 (age 53) Cristești, Romania

Sport
- Sport: Rowing
Medal record
Representing Romania
World Championships
Gold medal – first place	1993 Račice	Coxed fours
Gold medal – first place	1996 Motherwell	Coxed fours
Silver medal – second place	1993 Račice	Eights
Silver medal – second place	1997 Aiguebelette	Eights
Bronze medal – third place	1994 Indianapolis	Eights
Bronze medal – third place	1997 Aiguebelette	Coxless fours
Bronze medal – third place	1998 Cologne	Eights
Summer Universiade
Gold medal – first place	1993 Buffalo	Coxed fours

Dorin Alupei (born 24 February 1973) is a Romanian former rower. He competed at the 1996 Summer Olympics and the 2000 Summer Olympics. He is two-time world champion, winning in 1993 and 1996.
