= Pavel Menšík =

Czech rower

Personal information
- Nationality: Czech
- Born: 15 February 1968 (age 57); Olomouc, Czechoslovakia

Sport
- Sport: Rowing

Pavel Menšík (born 15 March 1968) is a Czech rower. He competed in the men's eight event at the 1992 Summer Olympics.
