= Robin McCall (rower) =

South African rower

Personal information
- Nationality: South African
- Born: 3 September 1964 (age 60)

Sport
- Sport: Rowing

Robin McCall (born 3 September 1964) is a South African rower. He competed in the men's eight event at the 1992 Summer Olympics.
