= Jens Pørneki =

Danish rower (born 1969)

Personal information
- Nationality: Danish
- Born: 19 June 1969 (age 56) Gentofte, Denmark

Sport
- Sport: Rowing

Jens Pørneki (born 19 June 1969) is a Danish rower. He competed in the men's eight event at the 1992 Summer Olympics.
