= Horacio Allegue =

Spanish rower

Personal information
- Full name: Horacio Allegue Lamas
- Nationality: Spanish
- Born: 7 March 1972 (age 53); Ares, Galicia, Spain

Sport
- Sport: Rowing

Horacio Allegue Lamas (born 7 March 1972) is a Spanish rower. He competed in the men's eight event at the 1992 Summer Olympics.
