= Marin Gheorghe =

Romanian rower (born 1959)

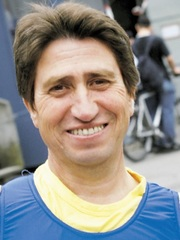

Personal information
- Born: 5 September 1959 (age 66) Glodeanu-Siliștea, Romania
- Height: 160 cm (5 ft 3 in)
- Weight: 51 kg (112 lb)

Sport
- Sport: Rowing
- Club: Dinamo Bucharest
Medal record
Representing Romania
Olympic Games
Silver medal – second place	1992 Barcelona	Eight
World Rowing Championships
Bronze medal – third place	1987 Copenhagen	Coxed pair
Gold medal – first place	1989 Bled	Coxed four
Silver medal – second place	1989 Bled	Coxed pair
Gold medal – first place	1993 Račice	Coxed four
Silver medal – second place	1993 Račice	Eight
Gold medal – first place	1994 Indianapolis	Coxed four
Bronze medal – third place	1994 Indianapolis	Eight
Bronze medal – third place	1994 Indianapolis	Coxed pair
Silver medal – second place	1997 Aiguebelette	Eight
Silver medal – second place	2000 Zagreb	Coxed pair
Gold medal – first place	2001 Lucerne	Eight
Bronze medal – third place	2001 Lucerne	Coxed pair

Marin Gheorghe (born 5 September 1959) is a retired Romanian rowing coxswain. He competed at the 1992 and 1996 Olympics and won a silver medal in eights in 1992. At the world championships he won 12 medals between 1987 and 2001, including four gold medals.
