= Ansgar Wessling =

West German rower

Personal information
- Born: 3 May 1961 (age 65) Essen, West Germany
- Height: 1.93 m (6 ft 4 in)
- Weight: 85 kg (187 lb)

Sport
- Sport: Rowing
- Club: Ruderriege TVK Essen
Medal record
Olympic Games
Representing West Germany
Gold medal – first place	1988 Seoul	Eight
Representing Germany
Bronze medal – third place	1992 Barcelona	Eight
World Championships
Representing West Germany
Gold medal – first place	1989 Bled	Eight
Silver medal – second place	1990 Tasmania	Coxed four
Representing Germany
Gold medal – first place	1991 Vienna	Eight

Ansgar Wessling (born 3 May 1961) is a retired West German competition rower. Between 1988 and 1992, he won two world titles and two Olympic medals in the eight event, as well as a silver in the coxed four at the 1990 World Championships.
