= Dănuț Dobre =

Romanian rower

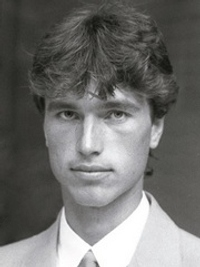

Personal information
- Born: 20 February 1967 (age 59) Fetești, Romania
- Height: 192 cm (6 ft 4 in)
- Weight: 85 kg (187 lb)

Sport
- Sport: Rowing
- Club: CSA Steaua Bucuresti (1985–1992)
Medal record
Representing Romania
Olympic Games
Silver medal – second place	1988 Seoul	Coxless pair
Silver medal – second place	1992 Barcelona	Eight
World Championships
Silver medal – second place	1987 Copenhagen	Coxless pair
Silver medal – second place	1991 Vienna	Coxed four
Summer Universiade
Gold medal – first place	1987 Zagreb	Coxless pair

Dănuț Dobre (born 20 February 1967) is a retired Romanian rower. Competing in different events he won four silver medals at two Olympics and two world championships between 1987 and 1992. After retiring from competitions in 1993, he worked in personal security, guarding Nicolae Văcăroiu, Ion Iliescu and Emil Constantinescu, among others.
