= Erich Mauff =

South African rower

Personal information
- Nationality: South African
- Born: 18 March 1967 (age 58)

Sport
- Sport: Rowing

Erich Mauff (born 18 March 1967) is a South African rower. He competed in the men's eight event at the 1992 Summer Olympics.
