= Bruce Robertson (rower) =

Canadian rower

Personal information
- Nationality: Canadian
- Born: June 17, 1962 (age 64)
Medal record
Men's rowing
Representing Canada
Olympic Games
Gold medal – first place	1992 Barcelona	Eight

Bruce Robertson (born June 17, 1962) is a Canadian competition rower and Olympic champion.

== Career ==
Robertson won a gold medal in the eight at the 1992 Summer Olympics in Barcelona, as a member of the Canadian team. He also competed in the coxless four at the 1988 Summer Olympics in Seoul, where he finished 11th.
