= Kay Worthington =

Canadian rower

Personal information
- Full name: Kay Frances Worthington
- Born: December 21, 1959 (age 66) Toronto, Ontario
- Height: 177 cm (5 ft 10 in)
- Weight: 72 kg (159 lb)
- Spouse: Mike Teti

Sport
- Country: Canada
- Sport: Rowing
- Club: Hanlan Boat Club; Argonaut Rowing Club
Medal record
Olympic Games
Gold medal – first place	1992 Barcelona	Coxless four
Gold medal – first place	1992 Barcelona	Eight
- Updated on February 15, 2017

Kay Worthington (born December 21, 1959) is a Canadian rower and Olympic champion. She won two gold medals at the 1992 Summer Olympics. Worthington was made a member of the Canadian Olympic Hall of Fame in 1994 and Canada’s Sports Hall of Fame in 2013.
