= Wayne Diplock =

Australian rower

Personal information
- Nationality: Australian
- Born: 8 March 1968 (age 57)

Sport
- Sport: Rowing

Wayne Diplock (born 8 March 1968) is an Australian rower. He competed in the men's eight event at the 1992 Summer Olympics.
