= Rowing at the 1993 Summer Universiade =

Rowing regatta

Rowing at the XVII Summer Universiade
- Venue: St. Catharines, Canada

Rowing was contested at the 1993 Summer Universiade in St. Catharines in Canada.

== Medal summary ==
=== Medal table ===
Rank	Nation	Gold	Silver	Bronze	Total
1	Canada	5	5	3	13
2	Romania	4	1	0	5
3	United States	1	2	2	5
4	France	1	1	1	3
4	Germany	1	1	1	3
6	China	1	1	0	2
7	Finland	1	0	0	1
7	Ukraine	1	0	0	1
9	Great Britain	0	3	0	3
10	Italy	0	1	2	3
11	Australia	0	0	2	2
11	Poland	0	0	2	2
13	Belgium	0	0	1	1
Totals (13 entries)		15	15	14	44

=== Men's events ===
Event	Gold	Silver	Bronze
Single sculls	Nicolae Tega; Romania	Derek Porter; Canada	Tom Symoens; Belgium
Quadruple sculls	Ukraine (UKR); Anton Prodan; Ihor Mohylniy; Kostyantyn Pronenko; Leonid Shaposhnikov	Canada (CAN); Derek Porter; Darren Barber; Phil Graham; Michael Forgeron	Poland (POL); Marek Kolbowicz; Jarosław Nowicki; Robert Zaborski; Piotr Bujnarowski
Lightweight single sculls	Vesa Keso; Finland	Ulf Meyer; Germany	Jason Dorland; United States
Lightweight double sculls	Germany (GER); Michael Schottler; Jens Weckbach	Italy (ITA); Carlo Mornati; Cris Rotta	Canada (CAN); Jeff Hilton; James Brambell
Lightweight coxless four	France (FRA); Christophe Alix; Xavier Dorfman; José Oyarzabal; Sébastien Bel	Great Britain (GBR); Jason Keys; Steve Ellis; Simon Cox; L. Morgan	Canada (CAN); Robert Fontaine; Chris Davidson; Steve Strba; Gavin Hassett
Lightweight eight	United States (USA); Nat Kochrane; John Glomb; Nick Lowel; Ken Cox; David Dragseth; Brad McMillan; Brian Winke; Karl Farber; Peter Cipollone (cox)	Great Britain (GBR); Clarry; Rogers; Wild; Cracknell; Behrens; Richard Phelps; Cassidy; Matthew Parish; Martin Haycock (cox)	Canada (CAN); Duncan Ruth; Jack Walkey; Shawn Walsh; Mark Platt; Gord Hughes; Michael Schellinck; Brad Crombie; Adam Parfitt; Jay Bertagnolli
Coxless pair	Canada (CAN); Phil Graham; Darren Barber	United States (USA); Tim Ryan; Jerome Ryan	Italy (ITA); Cristian Rotta; Carlo Mornati
Coxed four	Romania (ROU); Ioan Vizitiu; Cornel Nemțoc; Dorin Alupei; Iulică Ruican; Ioana Ilie	France (FRA); Hervé Marechal; Eric Brossard; Charlotie Gautho; Hervé Montico; Stéphane Guérinot	United States (USA); Adam Holland; Donald Mann; Jonathan Shields; Donald Ryan; Tom Brennan

=== Women's events ===
Event	Gold	Silver	Bronze
Single sculls	Veronica Cochela; Romania	Marnie McBean; Canada	Iza Wisiniewska; Poland
Quadruple sculls	Romania (ROU); Viorica Neculai; Ioana Oltbanu; Maria Padurariu; Constanta Pipota	Canada (CAN); Julie Jespersen; Maria Maunder; Emma Robinson; Lana Taves	Australia (AUS); E. O'Connor; B. Opferkuch; M. Tidey; E. Tidey
Lightweight single sculls	Wendy Wiebe; Canada	Phoebe White; Great Britain	Martina Orzan; Italy
Lightweight double sculls	Canada (CAN); Tracy Duncan; Rachel Starr	China (CHN); Huang Jielan; Peng Ailian	Germany (GER); Daniela Baur; Cora Zillich
Coxless pair	China (CHN); Ou Shaoyan; Zhong Aifang	Canada (CAN); Laurie Featherstone; Michelle Brindamour	Australia (AUS); K. McCallum; G. Radcliffe-Smith
Coxless four	Canada (CAN); Michelle Darvill; Kelly Mahon; Marnie McBean; Diane O'Grady	Romania (ROU); Veronica Cochela; Viorica Neculai; Ioana Olteanu; Constanta Pipota	France (FRA); Marie-P. Lafitte; V. Lyon-Perroux; Bénédicte Luzuy; Anne Tollard
Eight	Canada (CAN); Danya Boichuk; Theresa Luke; Kirsten Meisner; Clare Wilkinson; Maria Maunder; Emma Robinson; Julie Jespersen; Lana Taves; Kimberly Calder (cox)	United States (USA); Melissa Schwen; Kirsten Walsh; Rosanna Zeggara; Katherine Healey; Jennifer Dore; Erin Peterson; Jennifer O'Shea; Ashley Maddox; Chelsea Dwyer	No other competitors
