= Jonny Singfield =

British rower

Personal information
- Nationality: British
- Born: 19 April 1969 (age 55); Bedford, England
- Height: 6 ft 2 1/2 in (1.89 m)
- Weight: 194 lb (88 kg)

Sport
- Sport: Rowing

Jonathan Singfield (born 19 April 1969) is a British rower. He competed in the men's eight event at the 1992 Summer Olympics.
