= Grant Hillary =

South African rower (born 1969)

Personal information
- Nationality: South African
- Born: 12 November 1969 (age 55)

Sport
- Sport: Rowing

Grant Hillary (born 12 November 1969) is a South African rower. He competed in the men's eight event at the 1992 Summer Olympics.
