= Kent Skovsager =

Danish rower

Personal information
- Nationality: Danish
- Born: 3 August 1970 (age 55) Viborg, Denmark

Sport
- Sport: Rowing

Kent Skovsager (born 3 August 1970) is a Danish rower. He competed in the men's eight event at the 1992 Summer Olympics.
