= Josép Robert =

Spanish rower

Personal information
- Full name: Josép Robert Serra
- Nationality: Spanish
- Born: 13 February 1967 (age 58); Camós, Catalonia, Spain

Sport
- Sport: Rowing

Josép Robert Serra (born 13 February 1967) is a Spanish rower. He competed in the men's eight event at the 1992 Summer Olympics.
