= Steve Ellis (rower) =

British lightweight rower

Personal information
- Born: 29 February 1968 (age 58)
- Education: Imperial College London

Sport
- Sport: Rowing
Medal record
Representing Great Britain
World Rowing Championships
Gold medal – first place	1994 Indianapolis	Lwt eight
Summer Universiade
Silver medal – second place	1993 Buffalo	Lwt coxless fours

Steve Ellis (born 29 February 1968) is a British lightweight rower. He won a gold medal at the 1994 World Rowing Championships in Indianapolis with the lightweight men's eight.
