= Martin Walsh (rower) =

South African rower

Personal information
- Nationality: South African
- Born: 20 June 1962 (age 62)

Sport
- Sport: Rowing

Martin Walsh (born 20 June 1962) is a South African rower. He competed in the men's eight event at the 1992 Summer Olympics.
