= Darren Barber =

Canadian rower (born 1968)

Personal information
- Born: 26 December 1968 (age 57) Victoria, British Columbia, Canada

Sport
- Sport: Rowing
Medal record
Representing Canada
Olympic Games
Gold medal – first place	1992 Barcelona	Eight
World Championships
Silver medal – second place	1990 Tasmania	Eight
Silver medal – second place	1991 Vienna	Eight
Summer Universiade
Gold medal – first place	1993 Buffalo	Coxless pairs
Silver medal – second place	1993 Buffalo	Quadruple sculls

Darren Barber (born 26 December 1968) is a Canadian rower and Olympic champion. He is a graduate of Brentwood College School in Mill Bay, British Columbia.

Barber won a gold medal in the men's eight at the 1992 Summer Olympics in Barcelona, as a member of the Canadian team. He also competed at the 1996 Summer Olympics in Atlanta, where he finished 4th. In 2014, he coached the women's novice team at Trent University in Peterborough, Ontario.

== Personal ==
Barber's grandfather was former Toronto Maple Leafs hockey captain Syl Apps. His uncle was Syl Apps Jr., and his cousin Gillian Apps won gold medals with the Canadian Olympic women's ice hockey teams in 2006 and 2010.
