= Thorsten Streppelhoff =

German rower (born 1969)

Medal record

Men's rowing

Representing Germany

Olympic Games
Silver medal – second place	1996 Atlanta	Eight
Bronze medal – third place	1992 Barcelona	Eight

World Rowing Championships
Gold medal – first place	1991 Vienna	M8+
Gold medal – first place	1993 Račice	M8+
Silver medal – second place	1994 Indianapolis	M2-

Thorsten Streppelhoff (born 15 August 1969 in Dorsten) is a German rower.
