= Sergey Korotkikh (rower) =

Russian rower

Personal information
- Full name: Sergey Aleksandrovich Korotkikh
- Nationality: Soviet
- Born: 2 February 1967 (age 59)

Sport
- Sport: Rowing
Medal record
Representing Soviet Union
Summer Universiade
Silver medal – second place	1989 Duisburg	Eights

Sergey Korotkikh (Russian: Сергей Александрович Коротких; born 2 February 1967) is a Soviet rower. He competed in the men's eight event at the 1992 Summer Olympics.

Korotkikh is the coach of the Republic of Tatarstan's national rowing team.
