= Timothy Lahner =

South African rower

Personal information
- Nationality: South African
- Born: 16 April 1966 (age 58)

Sport
- Sport: Rowing

Timothy Lahner (born 16 April 1966) is a South African rower. He competed in the men's eight event at the 1992 Summer Olympics.
