= Nicolae Țaga =

Romanian rower

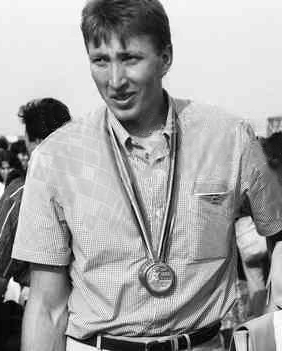
- Taga in 1992

Personal information
- Born: 12 April 1967 (age 59) Avrămeşti, Romania
- Height: 192 cm (6 ft 4 in)
- Weight: 94 kg (207 lb)

Sport
- Sport: Rowing
- Club: Dinamo Bucuresti
Medal record
Representing Romania
Olympic Games
Gold medal – first place	1992 Barcelona	Coxed four
Bronze medal – third place	1992 Barcelona	Coxed pair
World Rowing Championships
Gold medal – first place	1993 Račice	Coxed four
Silver medal – second place	1996 Motherwell	Coxed pair
Bronze medal – third place	1998 Cologne	Eight
Bronze medal – third place	1999 St. Catharines	Coxed four
Silver medal – second place	2000 Zagreb	Coxed pair

Nicolaie Taga (born 12 April 1967) is a retired Romanian rower. He competed in three events at the 1992 and 1996 Olympics and won a gold and a bronze medal in 1992. At the world championships he won a gold medal in 1993 followed by two silvers and two bronzes in 1996–2000.
