= Iulică Ruican =

Romanian rower

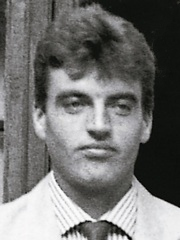

Personal information
- Born: 29 August 1971 (age 55) Cujmir, Romania

Sport
- Sport: Rowing
- Club: CSA Steaua București
Medal record
Representing Romania
Olympic Games
Gold medal – first place	1992 Barcelona	Coxed four
Silver medal – second place	1992 Barcelona	Eight
World Rowing Championships
Gold medal – first place	1993 Račice	Coxed four
Gold medal – first place	1994 Indianapolis	Coxed four
Gold medal – first place	1996 Motherwell	Coxed four
Silver medal – second place	1993 Račice	Eight
Silver medal – second place	1997 Aiguebelette	Eight
Bronze medal – third place	1994 Indianapolis	Eight
Bronze medal – third place	1998 Cologne	Eight
Summer Universiade
Gold medal – first place	1993 Buffalo	Coxed four

Iulică Ruican (born 29 August 1971) is a retired Romanian rower. He competed in coxed fours and eights at the 1992 and 1996 Olympics and won a gold and a silver medal in 1992. At the 1996 Olympics he served as a flag bearer for Romania at the opening ceremony. At the world championships he won seven medals between 1993 and 1998, including three gold medals.

Ruican took up rowing aged 16, and after retiring from competitions became vice president of his native club CSA Steaua București. His wife Anca Tănase is also a former Olympic rower.
