= Main-à-Dieu =

Community in Nova Scotia, Canada

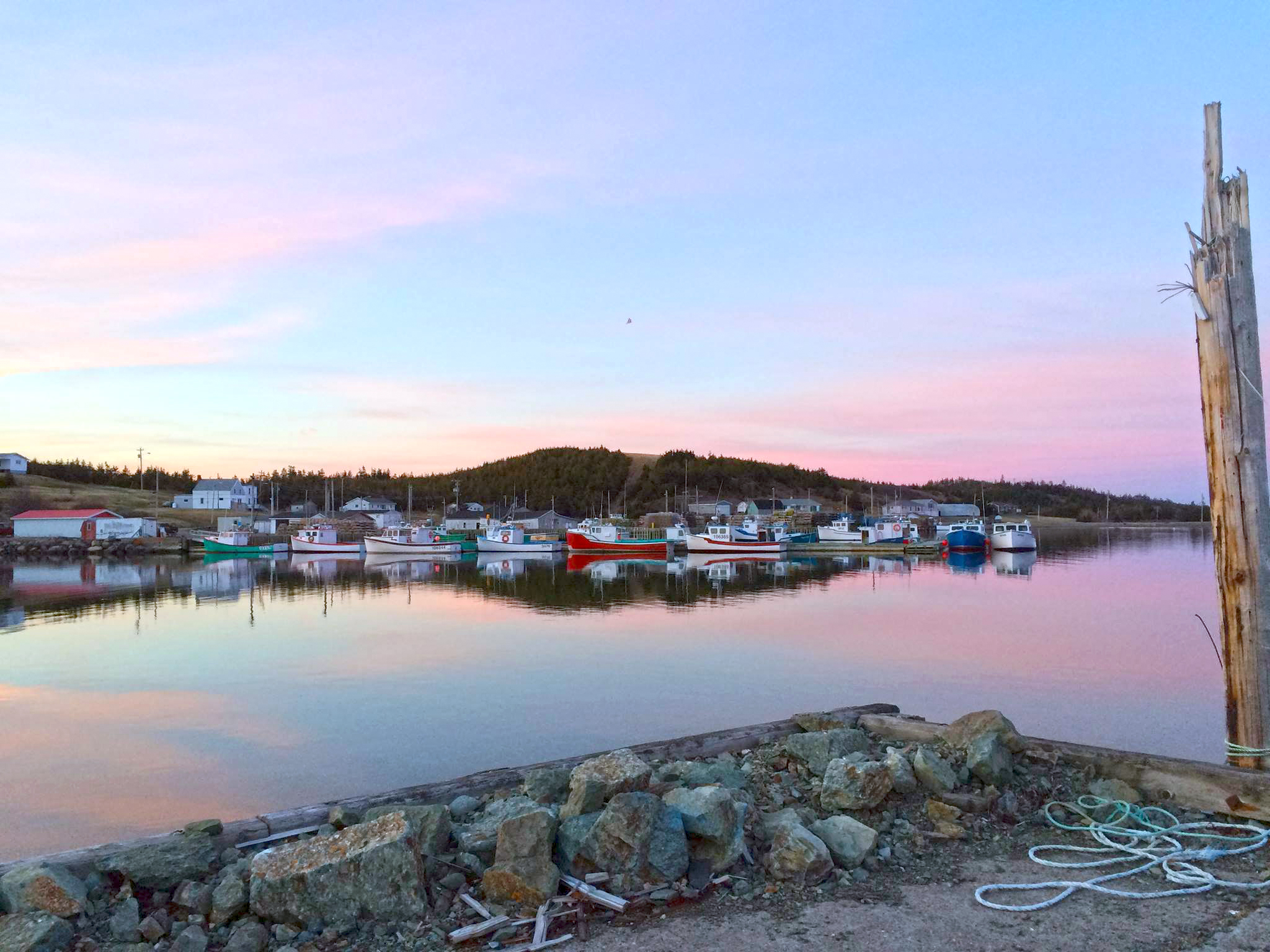
- Harbour at Main-à-Dieu

- Map Main-à-Dieu in Nova Scotia
- Coordinates: 46°0′18.47″N 59°50′48.71″W
- Country: Canada
- Province: Nova Scotia
- Municipality: Cape Breton Regional Municipality

Main-à-Dieu (population 242) is a community in the Canadian province of Nova Scotia, located in Cape Breton Regional Municipality. It is the most easterly community in Nova Scotia.

Main-à-Dieu has a rich history tied to both its French origins and its role in the region's maritime industry. It was originally settled by French fishermen in the 17th century, likely attracted by the abundance of fish in the area's waters. These early settlers engaged in the lucrative cod fishery, establishing a thriving fishing community.

During the French colonial period in Nova Scotia, Main-à-Dieu was part of the territory known as Acadia. However, after the British conquest of Acadia in the early 18th century, the region came under British control, leading to the expulsion of many Acadian residents.

It is a fishing village, the homeport for a large lobster fishing fleet, and each spring at the start of lobster fishing season, the local parish priest holds a blessing of the fleet service dockside to pray for the safety of fishermen.

It once had an elementary school, with classes from grades primary to six, but it and several others were combined in 2000 into Riverside Elementary School, and the building has housed the Coastal Discovery Centre since 2004.

The centre includes the Fisherman's Museum, The Big Wave Café and the local library, all of which had previously been housed elsewhere in the community.

Less than half a kilometre from the discovery centre is a sandy beach that stretches along the coast for more than a kilometre. A boardwalk was constructed along the beach in the mid-1990s.

== Notable residents ==
- Michael Forgeron, Olympic rower
