= Wang Fang (rower) =

Chinese rower

Wang Fang is a Chinese lightweight rower. She has won medals at World Rowing Championships in 1993 (silver, double sculls), 1994 (bronze, lightweight four), and 1996 (gold, lightweight four).
