= Thomas Larsen (rower, born 1968) =

Danish rower

Personal information
- Nationality: Danish
- Born: 16 October 1968 (age 56); Holstebro, Denmark

Sport
- Sport: Rowing

Thomas Larsen (born 16 October 1968) is a Danish rower. He competed in the men's eight event at the 1992 Summer Olympics.
