= Walter Bottega =

Italian rower

Personal information
- Nationality: Italian
- Born: 24 May 1972 (age 52); Turin, Italy

Sport
- Sport: Rowing

Walter Bottega (born 24 May 1972) is an Italian rower. He competed at the 1992 Summer Olympics and the 1996 Summer Olympics.
