= Yao Jianzhong =

Chinese rower

Personal information
- Nationality: Chinese
- Born: 16 January 1971 (age 54)

Sport
- Sport: Rowing

Yao Jianzhong (born 16 January 1971) is a Chinese rower. He competed in the men's eight event at the 1992 Summer Olympics.
