= Tom Moody (artist) =

American visual artist (died 2022)

- Born: 1960s New York City, U.S.
- Died: March 19, 2022; Goldthwaite, Texas, U.S.
- Education: University of Virginia, Corcoran School of Art, School of Visual Arts
- Known for: New media
- Notable work: "Surge Drawing (Canary)", "Portraits", "OptiDisc (Large Bits)", "pencil_test_1a", "Circle Gradient", "Monochrome Gradient"

Tom Moody (died March 19, 2022) was an American visual artist, critic and blogger based in New York City. He began his career as a painter, using traditional materials, but became sensitive to the chemicals. In the mid-1990s, upon moving to New York, he began working with MS Paintbrush during downtime at a day job and continued using this software throughout his life, despite more sophisticated programs such as Photoshop being widely available. Later works made use of animated GIF files.

== Life and career ==
Moody grew up in Texas, then double majored in fine arts (painting) and English Literature at the University of Virginia, and worked as an artist and critic in Dallas for local papers and Artforum before moving to New York.

In addition to obsolete software, his artworks combined traditional and digital material, media and techniques, combining art and craft. The New York Times reviewed his artworks, calling them "amusing, also, for the way they fuse high modern associations, like Cubism or Greenbergian all-overness, with kitsch associations of Op Art and cheap office technology."

He showed these new media artworks at the Museum of Modern Art in New York; the New Museum; Galapagos Art Space, Brooklyn; the Aldrich Contemporary Art Museum, Connecticut; the University at Buffalo, New York; the Drawing Center, New York; Harbourfront Centre, Toronto Canada; Homeroom, Munich, Germany; among others. One of his artist books is in the collection of the MoMA.

His art criticism was published by Art Papers, Artforum, Sculpture Magazine and New Art Examiner.

In 2001, Moody began blogging about art, and as a venue to show his own art. His art blog received national and international interest from Art in America, Contemporary magazine and Rhizome. His blog covered art and culture, as well as serving as a forum for publishing his own digital works. Art in America said, of his blog, "the site of New York painter Tom Moody shares with viewers images of his own paintings, his studio process, his visual passions and assorted enthusiasms. He also devoted a lot of space to the work of other artists who shared his interest in the intersection of abstraction and digital art. Mesmerizing digital animations and occasional comments, always opinionated and thoughtful, on exhibitions and art-world developments."

Moody died from COVID-19 related causes in Goldthwaite, Texas, on March 19, 2022.
