= David Colvin (rower) =

Australian rowing cox

Personal information
- Born: 4 November 1961 (age 64) Melbourne, Australia
- Education: Melbourne Grammar School

Sport
- Sport: Rowing
- Club: Banks Rowing Club; Mercantile Rowing Club
Medal record
Men's rowing
Representing Australia
World Rowing Championships
Bronze medal – third place	1997 Aiguebelette	M8+
Silver medal – second place	1997 Aiguebelette	M2+

David Colvin (born 4 November 1961) is an Australian former rowing coxswain and a rowing coach. He is a ten-time Australian King's Cup champion, an Olympian and a medalist at World Rowing Championships.

== State and club rowing ==
Colvin was educated at Melbourne Grammar School where he was introduced to rowing. He steered that school's second VIII to a victory at the Victorian schools' Head of the River in 1979. His senior club rowing was initially from the Banks Rowing Club in Melbourne starting in 1980, and from 1988 at the Mercantile Rowing Club.

Colvin was first selected to cox the Victorian men's eight contesting the 1985 King's Cup at the Interstate Regatta within the Australian Rowing Championships. Between 1985 and 2000 he coxed twelve Victorian King's Cup crews. This was a particular period of Victorian state dominance with the Victorian eight seated with members of the Oarsome Foursome and other national oarsmen. Consequently of the twelve times he contested the event, Colvin steered ten Victorian eights to King's Cup victory.

== International representative rowing ==
Colvin made his Australian representative debut in a coxed four at the 1990 World Rowing Championships in Lake Barrington, Tasmania. He coxed that crew to an overall ninth placing. In 1991 he steered the Australian men's lightweight eight to their fourth place finish at the 1991 World Rowing Championships in Vienna.

At the Barcelona Olympics in 1992, Colvin made his Olympic debut. He coxed the Australian men's eight who made the Olympic final and finished in fifth place. He held his seat in the stern of Australian eight into 1993 and competed at the 1993 World Rowing Championships where the eight placed fourth.

Colvin's chief selection rival during his representative career was his Mercantile club-mate Brett Hayman who competed with Colvin for the coxswain's seat in the Australian men's senior eight during the 1990s. In 1995 Colvin was again in a national representative boat steering the men's coxed four who finished in fifth place at the 1995 World Rowing Championships in Tampere. 1997 saw Colvin back in the Australian eight. As an Australian Institute of Sport selection eight they contested and won the 1997 Grand Challenge Cup at the Henley Royal Regatta. The 1997 Australian eight then raced at two World Rowing Cups in Europe before contesting the 1997 World Rowing Championships in Aiguebelette where they took a bronze medal. In 1998 he again coxed the Australian men's eight and at the 1998 World Rowing Championships in Cologne they raced to a six placed finish. It was his last Australian representative campaign.

== Coaching and administration ==
A long term Mercantile clubman, Colvin was club captain from 2000 to 2004.

He has coached women's crews at club and state representative level since 2002. He coached the Victorian representative women's lightweight quad in 2004, 2006 and 2007 including their 2006 Victoria Cup victory. Between 2008 and 2013 he was the co-coach of five Queen's Cup winning Victorian women's eights at the Australian Rowing Championships.
