= Jiang Haiyang =

Chinese rower (born 1968)

Personal information
- Nationality: Chinese
- Born: 28 December 1968 (age 56)

Sport
- Sport: Rowing

Jiang Haiyang (born 28 December 1968) is a Chinese rower. He competed in the men's eight event at the 1992 Summer Olympics.
