= Petr Blecha =

Czech rower

Personal information
- Nationality: Czech
- Born: 24 April 1970 (age 54); Prague, Czechoslovakia

Sport
- Sport: Rowing

Petr Blecha (born 24 April 1970) is a Czech rower. He competed in the men's eight event at the 1992 Summer Olympics.
