= Hiroshi Mitome =

Japanese rower (born 1960)

Personal information
- Nationality: Japanese
- Born: 30 August 1960 (age 65)

Sport
- Sport: Rowing

Hiroshi Mitome (born 30 August 1960) is a Japanese rower. He competed in the men's eight event at the 1992 Summer Olympics.
