= Michael Rascher =

Canadian rower

Medal record

Men's rowing

Representing Canada

Olympic Games
Gold medal – first place	1992 Barcelona	Eight

Michael G. Rascher (born 26 July 1965 in Edmonton, Alberta) is a retired rower from Canada. He competed at the 1992 Summer Olympics for his native country. There he was a member of the team that won the gold medal in the men's Eights.
