= Li Zhongping =

Chinese rower

Personal information
- Nationality: Chinese
- Born: 9 June 1965 (age 60)

Sport
- Sport: Rowing

Li Zhongping (born 9 June 1965) is a Chinese rower. He competed in the men's eight event at the 1992 Summer Olympics.
