= Jordi Quer =

Spanish rower

Personal information
- Nationality: Spanish
- Born: 23 August 1970 (age 54)

Sport
- Sport: Rowing

Jordi Quer (born 23 August 1970) is a Spanish rower. He competed in the men's eight event at the 1992 Summer Olympics.
