= Dušan Businský =

Czech rower (born 1968)

Personal information
- Nationality: Czech
- Born: 23 May 1968 (age 56); Ústí nad Labem, Czechoslovakia

Sport
- Sport: Rowing

Dušan Businský (born 23 May 1968) is a Czech rower. He competed in the men's eight event at the 1992 Summer Olympics.
