= Carsten Hassing =

Danish rower

Personal information
- Nationality: Danish
- Born: 18 January 1967 (age 58); Gladsaxe, Denmark

Sport
- Sport: Rowing

Carsten Hassing (born 18 January 1967) is a Danish rower. He competed in the men's eight event at the 1992 Summer Olympics.
