= Svilen Neykov =

Bulgarian politician and rower

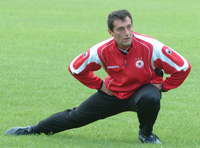
- Svilen Emilov Neykov

Personal information
- Born: 14 December 1964 (age 61) Varna, Bulgaria

Sport
- Sport: Rowing
Medal record
Representing Bulgaria
Summer Universiade
Gold medal – first place	1989 Duisburg	Lwt single sculls

Svilen Emilov Neykov (Bulgarian: Свилен Емилов Нейков; born 14 December 1964) is a Bulgarian rower, rowing coach and former Minister of Physical Education and Sport in Bulgaria from 27 July 2009 to 21 February 2013.

He is known for coaching his wife, 2008 Olympic gold medalist rower Rumyana Neykova. She has gold, silver and bronze medal from three consecutive Summer Olympic Games.

Neykov was born in Varna. He graduated from the National Sports Academy in Sofia, where he is currently head assistant professor of basic sports training. Neykov is a multiple national and Balkan rowing champion. He represented Bulgaria at the 1989 and 1990 World Rowing Championships. In 1989, he became world student champion in rowing at the 1989 Summer Universiade in Duisburg, West Germany.

As the coach of Bulgaria's national rowing team, Neykov has qualified for World Championships, brought teams to a top three Rowing World Cup finish, earned a bronze medal from the 1999 World Rowing Championships and a 2000 Summer Olympics quota. In June 2006, Neykov has worked as a physical coach at PFC CSKA Sofia.

Neykov is fluent in English, German and Russian.
