= Vitaliy Raievskiy =

Ukrainian rower

Personal information
- Nationality: Ukrainian
- Born: 12 May 1967 (age 57); Zaporizhia, Ukrainian SSR, Soviet Union

Sport
- Sport: Rowing

Vitaliy Raievskiy (born 12 May 1967) is a Ukrainian rower. He competed at the 1992 Summer Olympics and the 1996 Summer Olympics.
