= Josu Andueza =

Spanish rower

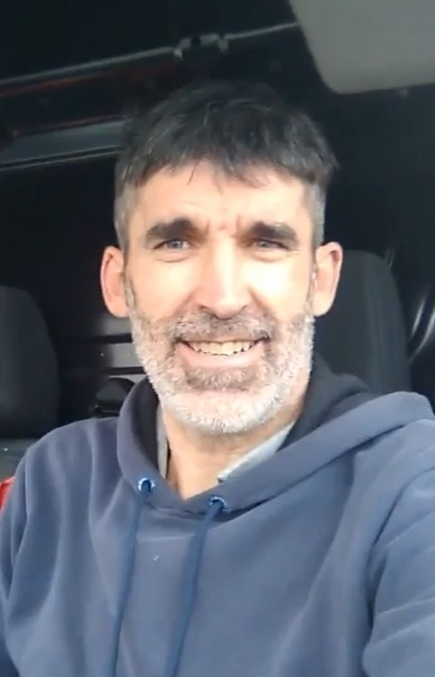

Personal information
- Full name: Josu Mirena Andueza Zabaleta
- Nationality: Spanish
- Born: 5 June 1973 (age 51); Lezo, Basque Country, Spain

Sport
- Sport: Rowing

Josu Andueza Zabaleta (born 5 June 1973) is a Spanish rower. He competed in the men's eight event at the 1992 Summer Olympics.
