= Roberto Blanda =

Italian rower

Personal information
- Nationality: Italian
- Born: 14 December 1970 (age 54); Rome, Italy

Sport
- Sport: Rowing

Roberto Blanda (born 14 December 1970) is an Italian former rower. He competed at the 1992 Summer Olympics and the 1996 Summer Olympics.

In February 2019 Blanda, who at the time of his conviction worked in the tobacco industry, was found guilty of taking upskirt photos of a woman on a train in London in 2018, an act which has since been made a criminal offence under the Sexual Offences Act 2003. Blanda was fined one week's pay - £1,800 - for his actions.

Blanda currently works as Vice President of Human Resources for MSC Cruises.
