= Scott Munn =

American rower (born 1970)

Medal record

Men's rowing

Representing United States

World Rowing Championships
Gold medal – first place	1995 Tampere	M4+

James Scott Munn (born May 21, 1970, in Littleton, Colorado) is an American rower.
