= Kazuhisa Yamani =

Japanese rower (born 1970)

Personal information
- Nationality: Japanese
- Born: 8 September 1970 (age 54)

Sport
- Sport: Rowing

Kazuhisa Yamani (山児 和久, Yamani Kazuhisa, born 8 September 1970) is a Japanese rower. He competed in the men's eight event at the 1992 Summer Olympics, where his team finished 13th in the men's eight competition.

Yamani was affiliated with Waseda University in Tokyo during his rowing career.
