= Takatoshi Iwatsuki =

Japanese rower (born 1964)

Personal information
- Nationality: Japanese
- Born: 29 November 1964 (age 61)

Sport
- Sport: Rowing

Takatoshi Iwatsuki (born 29 November 1964) is a Japanese rower. He competed in the men's eight event at the 1992 Summer Olympics.
