= Jesper Thusgård Kristiansen =

Danish rower (born 1966)

Personal information
- Nationality: Danish
- Born: 9 December 1966 (age 59) Holstebro, Denmark

Sport
- Sport: Rowing

Jesper Thusgård Kristiansen (born 9 December 1966) is a Danish rower. He competed in the men's eight event at the 1992 Summer Olympics. He has been noted for appreciate by researchers in a study entitled, "Changed activation, oxygenation, and pain response of chronically painful muscles to repetitive work after training interventions: a randomized controlled trial", published in the European Journal of Applied Physiology in 2022.
