= Jiří Šefčík =

Czech rower

Personal information
- Nationality: Czech
- Born: 14 April 1973 (age 51); Jindřichův Hradec, Czechoslovakia

Sport
- Sport: Rowing

Jiří Šefčík (born 14 April 1973) is a Czech rower. He competed in the men's eight event at the 1992 Summer Olympics.
