= Yuri Korotkikh =

Soviet footballer

Personal information
- Full name: Yuri Pavlovich Korotkikh
- Date of birth: 23 November 1939
- Place of birth: Dunaevo, Sretensky District, Soviet Union
- Date of death: 29 February 2016 (aged 76)
- Place of death: Ukraine
- Height: 1.75 m (5 ft 9 in)
- Position: Goalkeeper

Youth career
- Zvezda Tyumen

Senior career*
Years	Team	Apps	(Gls)
1958–1959	Metallurg Nizhny Tagil	50	(0)
1960–1961	CSKA Moscow	5	(0)
1961–1962	Serpukhov	25	(0)
1963	SKA Rostov-on-Don	0	(0)
1963	Krylia Sovetov Kuybyshev	32	(0)
1964–1969	Shakhtar Donetsk	104	(0)
1969	Kryvbas Kryvyi Rih	29	(0)
1970–1973	Metallurg Zhdanov	69	(0)
- * Club domestic league appearances and goals

Yuri Pavlovich Korotkikh (Russian: Юрий Павлович Коротких; 23 November 1939 – 29 February 2016) was a Soviet footballer who played as a goalkeeper in the 1950s and 1960s.

== Career ==
Born in Sretensky District, Chita Oblast, Korotkikh began playing youth football with Mekhannik Tyumen. He was drafted into the Soviet Army and played football for Zvezda Tyumen. In 1958, Korotkikh joined Metallurg Nizhny Tagil where he made his professional debut in the Soviet First League. After performing well for Metallurg, Korotkikh was selected for a Soviet Union youth national team tour of Korea DPR and Vietnam, and a move to Soviet Top League side PFC CSKA Moscow followed.

At CSKA, Korotkikh was a reserve to national team goalkeeper Boris Razinsky. After making only five league appearances for CSKA, Korotkikh was sent out to Serpukhov, SKA Rostov-on-Don and Krylia Sovetov Kuybyshev.

In 1964, Korotkikh joined Soviet Top League side Shakhtar Donetsk where he would enjoy his greatest successes. He appeared in 111 competitive matches for Shakhtar, was named to the list of the 33 best Soviet Top League players three times, and was awarded an Honoured Masters of Sport of the USSR. During the 1966 season, Korotkikh had a 913-minute streak of league play without conceding a goal, the third best of all time in the Soviet Top League.

At the end of his playing career, Korotkikh joined Soviet Second League side Metalurh Zhdanov. After he retired from playing, he stayed in Zhdanov to work as a coach for Metalurh and another local club, Lokomotiv.
