= Masahiro Sakata =

Japanese rower (born 1962)

Personal information
- Nationality: Japanese
- Born: 25 August 1962 (age 63)

Sport
- Sport: Rowing

Masahiro Sakata (born 25 August 1962) is a Japanese rower. He competed at the 1988 Summer Olympics and the 1992 Summer Olympics.
