= Hidekazu Hayashi =

Japanese rower (born 1965)

Personal information
- Nationality: Japanese
- Born: 19 January 1965 (age 61)

Sport
- Sport: Rowing

Hidekazu Hayashi (林 秀一, Hayashi Hidekazu; born 19 January 1965) is a Japanese rower. He competed in the men's eight event at the 1992 Summer Olympics.
