= Mike Teti =

American rower (born 1956)

Personal information
- Full name: Michael Francis Teti
- Born: September 20, 1956 (age 70) Upper Darby Township, Pennsylvania, U.S.
- Height: 6 ft 2 in (188 cm)
- Weight: 185 lb (84 kg)
- Spouse: Kay Worthington
Medal record
Men's rowing
Representing United States
Olympic Games
Bronze medal – third place	1988 Seoul	Eight
World Rowing Championships
Gold medal – first place	1987 Copenhagen	M8+
Bronze medal – third place	1985 Hazewinkel	M8+

Michael Francis Teti (born September 20, 1956) is an American Olympic rowing coach and former rower. Formerly the head coach of men's crew at the University of California, Berkeley, he is a twelve-time U.S. national team member, three-time Olympian (including a bronze medal at the 1988 Olympics), a member of the world champion men's eight in 1987, and is a member of the U.S. National Rowing Hall of Fame as both an athlete and coach. He formerly served as US Men's head coach.

== Early life and education ==
Born in Upper Darby Township, Pennsylvania, Teti attended Monsignor Bonner High School and is a 1978 graduate of St. Joseph's University.

He is a member of the St. Joseph's Hall of Fame.

== Coaching ==
Teti's coaching experience includes positions at Temple University, coach of the freshman squad at Princeton University, the U.S. national team, and U.S. Men's Olympic teams. Teti served as US Rowing's men's head coach from 1997 to 2008. The U.S. national team crews produced 28 total medals under Teti's guidance during that time period, including four gold medals (1997, 1998, 1999 and 2005). He is the only coach to lead U.S. teams to three consecutive world championship title (1997, 1998, 1999). He was the head coach of men's rowing at the University of California from 2008 to 2018. In 2018, he was named head men's coach for USRowing, returning to a position he held from 1997 to 2008.

Teti has served as both an athlete and coach for U.S. men's national and Olympic rowing teams. As a coach, he led the U.S. team to 29 world and Olympic medals, including Olympic gold in 2004 in Athens. He is the only person inducted into the U.S. National Rowing Hall of Fame as both an athlete and coach.

Some other coaching highlights:

He also coached the silver-medal performance by the men's eight at the world championships in Sarasota, Florida.

In the summer of 2011, Teti enjoyed more success at the international level. He coached the U.S. men's eight that claimed first in a record-setting time (5:24.31) at the 2011 U23 World Championships in Amsterdam, the Netherlands.

Teti led Cal's varsity eight to a fourth-place finish in the 2012 IRA National Championships in New Jersey and a second-place finish at the Pac-12 Championships in Lake Natoma. Three Golden Bears were selected to the 2012 All-Pac-12 squad in Cameron Klotz, Ivan Ostojic and Chris Yeager.

Teti guided Cal's varsity eight to a third-place finish at the IRA national championships and second place at the Pac-10 championships in 2011. Under the tutelage of Teti, Samuel Walker was named the 2011 Pac-10 Athlete of the Year, while Dane Oatman garnered Newcomer of the Year honors. It was the second straight season that a Cal rower was named the Athlete of the Year

In the 2010 collegiate campaign, Teti helped Cal's varsity eight to the 2010 IRA Championship and a second-place finish at the Pac-10 Championships. It was Cal's 16th IRA national title in the varsity eight.

In December 2008, Teti received the USRowing Medal, the highest honor that the rowing governing body can bestow.

In March 2010, Teti was inducted into the National Rowing Hall of Fame as the coach of the gold medal-winning men¹s eight at the 2004 Athens Olympic Games. Teti was the first person to be inducted into the Hall of Fame as both a coach and an athlete.

== Controversies ==
In 2016, a female former member of the Cal rowing team accused Teti of failing to act after she accused a male rower of sexual assault. The woman alleged that instead of launching an investigation and reporting the allegation to university officials, Teti told her to “stop crying,” asked her about her sexual history with other rowers and barked, “You’re no angel anyway.” Following the allegations, UC Berkeley complaint resolution officer Paula Raffaelli said the men's crew coaches and athletes would receive additional training related to sexual violence and harassment, “with a specific emphasis on gender and sex stereotyping.” Another female former Cal rower, Stephanie Gardner, said she quit Teti's team in 2012 because of relentless bullying by males on the team, and a culture of abuse that went on with full knowledge of the coaching staff. In 2018, Teti stepped down as coach at Cal.

On July 18, 2021, the Associated Press (“AP”) ran an article stating multiple rowers had direct knowledge “of Teti physically threatening athletes or verbally attacking them.” The AP later reported in October 2021 that U.S. Rowing had accepted Teti’s resignation.

== Achievements ==
1979 Pan American Games / Men's Four / Silver Medal – USRowing as Athlete

1985 World Championships / Men's Eight / Bronze Medal – USRowing as Athlete

1987 World Championships / Men's Eight / Gold Medal – USRowing as Athlete

1988 Olympic Games / Seoul, Korea / Men's Eight / Bronze Medal – Olympic Rowing as Athlete

1996 Olympic Games / Atlanta / Men's Four Lightweight Coach / Bronze Medal – U.S. Olympic Team as Coach

1997 World Rowing Championships / Men's Eight / Gold Medal - USRowing as Coach

1998 World Rowing Championships / Men's Eight / Gold Medal - USRowing as Coach

1999 World Rowing Championships / Men's Eight / Gold Medal - USRowing as Coach

2000 Olympic Games / Sydney, Australia / Men's Sweep Coach / Men's Pair / Silver Medal – U.S. Olympic Team as Coach

2004 Olympic Games / Athens, Greece / Men's Coach / Men's Eight / Gold Medal – U.S. Olympic Team as Coach

2005 World Rowing Championships / Men's Eight / Gold Medal - USRowing as Coach

2008 Olympic Games / Beijing, China / Men's Coach / Men's Eight / Bronze Medal – U.S. Olympic Team as Coach

2012 Olympic Games / London, England / Assistant Coach / Men's Eight / 4th Place – U.S. Olympic Team as Coach

2017 World Rowing Championships / Men's Eight / Silver Medal - USRowing as Coach
