= Jeffrey Klepacki =

American rower (born 1968)

Personal information
- Full name: Jeffrey Gerard Klepacki
- Born: December 17, 1968 (age 57) Kearny, New Jersey, U.S.
Medal record
Men's rowing
Representing United States
World Rowing Championships
Gold medal – first place	1994 Indianapolis	M8+
Gold medal – first place	1998 Cologne	M8+
Gold medal – first place	1999 St. Catharines	M8+
Silver medal – second place	2003 Milan	M8+
Bronze medal – third place	1993 Račice	M4-
Bronze medal – third place	1995 Tampere	M8+
Pan American Games
Gold medal – first place	1995 Mar del Plata	M4-
Gold medal – first place	1995 Mar del Plata	M8+

Jeffrey Gerard Klepacki (born December 17, 1968) is an American rower. He represented the United States in the Olympics (1992, 1996 and 2000). Klepacki led the US Heavyweight 8+ to the gold medal in the world rowing championships in 1994 and again won World Championship gold medals in the Heavyweight 8+ in 1998 and 1999. Klepacki grew up in Kearny, New Jersey, and started rowing while attending Kearny High School. He then attended Rutgers University.
