= Ioan Vizitiu =

Romanian rower (born 1970)

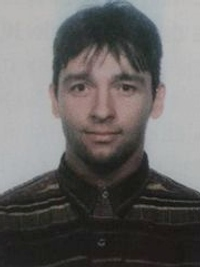

Personal information
- Born: 3 February 1970 (age 56) Bârlad, Romania

Sport
- Sport: Rowing
- Club: Dinamo Bucharest
Medal record
Representing Romania
Olympic Games
Silver medal – second place	1992 Barcelona	Eights
World Rowing Championships
Silver medal – second place	1993 Račice	Eights
Bronze medal – third place	1994 Indianapolis	Coxed pairs
Summer Universiade
Gold medal – first place	1993 Buffalo	Coxed four

Ioan Iulian Vizitiu (born 3 February 1970) is a retired Romanian rower. Competing in eights he won silver medals at the 1992 Olympics and 1993 World Championships.
