= Hiroyoshi Matsui =

Japanese rower (born 1966)

Personal information
- Nationality: Japanese
- Born: 26 November 1966 (age 59)

Sport
- Sport: Rowing

Hiroyoshi Matsui (born 26 November 1966) is a Japanese rower. He competed in the men's eight event at the 1992 Summer Olympics.
