= Pavel Sokol (rower) =

Czech rower

Personal information
- Nationality: Czech
- Born: 30 June 1969 (age 55); Uherské Hradiště, Czechoslovakia

Sport
- Sport: Rowing

Pavel Sokol (born 30 June 1969) is a Czech former rower. He competed in two events at the 1992 Summer Olympics.
