= Xu Wuling =

Chinese rower (born 1971)

Personal information
- Native name: 许武岭
- Nationality: Chinese
- Born: 14 September 1971 (age 55)

Sport
- Sport: Rowing

Xu Wuling
- Traditional Chinese: 許武嶺
- Simplified Chinese: 许武岭
Transcriptions
Standard Mandarin
- Hanyu Pinyin: Xú Wǔlǐng
- Bopomofo: ㄒㄩˊ ㄨˇ ㄌㄧㄥˇ
- Wade–Giles: Hsü^{2} Wu^{3}-ling^{3}
Yue: Cantonese
- Yale Romanization: Héui Móuhlíhng
- Jyutping: heoi2 mou5 ling5

Xu Wuling (许武岭, born 14 September 1971) is a Chinese rower. He competed in two events at the 1992 Summer Olympics.
