= Feng Feng (rower) =

Chinese rower (born 1971)

Personal information
- Nationality: Chinese
- Born: 10 June 1971 (age 54)

Sport
- Sport: Rowing

Feng Feng (born 10 June 1971) is a Chinese rower. He competed in two events at the 1992 Summer Olympics.
