= Sun Senlin =

Chinese rower

Personal information
- Nationality: Chinese
- Born: 25 March 1968 (age 57)

Sport
- Sport: Rowing

Sun Senlin (born 25 March 1968) is a Chinese rower. He competed in two events at the 1992 Summer Olympics.
