= Yasunori Tanabe =

Japanese rower (born 1967)

Personal information
- Nationality: Japanese
- Born: 3 March 1967 (age 59)

Sport
- Sport: Rowing

Yasunori Tanabe (Japanese: 田邉 保典; born 3 March 1967) is a Japanese rower. He competed at the 1992 Summer Olympics, 1996 Summer Olympics and the 2000 Summer Olympics.
