= Huang Xiaoping =

Chinese rower

Personal information
- Nationality: Chinese
- Born: 9 February 1973 (age 52)

Sport
- Sport: Rowing

Huang Xiaoping (born 9 February 1973) is a Chinese rower. He competed at the 1992 Summer Olympics and the 1996 Summer Olympics.
