= Michinori Iwaguro =

Japanese rower (born 1966)

Personal information
- Nationality: Japanese
- Born: 10 December 1966 (age 59)

Sport
- Sport: Rowing

Michinori Iwaguro (Japanese: 岩畔 道徳; born 10 December 1966) is a Japanese rower. He competed at the 1992 Summer Olympics and the 1996 Summer Olympics.
