= 1989 Summer Universiade =

Multi-sport event in Duisburg, Germany

XV Summer Universiade XV Sommer-Universiade
- Host city: Duisburg, West Germany
- Nations: 79
- Athletes: 1,785
- Events: 66 in 4 sports
- Opening: August 22, 1989
- Closing: August 30, 1989
- Opened by: Chancellor Helmut Kohl
- Torch lighter: Heide Ecker-Rosendahl
- Main venue: Wedaustadion

The 1989 Summer Universiade, also known as the XV Summer Universiade, took place in Duisburg, West Germany. It was a scaled-down event with only four sports after the original hosts, Brazil, were forced to pull out due to a mounting financial crisis in that country. A total of 1785 athletes from 79 nations participated in the event organized by the International University Sports Federation.

== Sports ==
- Athletics (42)
- Basketball (1)
- Fencing (10)
- Rowing (13)

== Venues ==
Venue	Sports	Capacity	Ref.			
Venue	Sports	Capacity	Ref.	Wedaustadion	Ceremonies (opening/closing), athletics	38,000
Duisburg Universiade Arena	Basketball, fencing	15,000				
Wedau	Rowing	10,000				

== Medal table ==
* Host nation (West Germany)

Rank	Nation	Gold	Silver	Bronze	Total
1	Soviet Union (URS)	9	11	8	28
2	United States (USA)	9	9	8	26
3	Cuba (CUB)	8	7	4	19
4	Italy (ITA)	8	3	5	16
5	Romania (ROU)	8	2	0	10
6	Hungary (HUN)	4	4	1	9
7	China (CHN)	4	2	5	11
8	West Germany (FRG)*	3	8	8	19
9	Kenya (KEN)	3	2	1	6
10	Bulgaria (BUL)	2	0	0	2
11	France (FRA)	1	1	3	5
12	East Germany (GDR)	1	1	2	4
12	Great Britain (GBR)	1	1	2	4
12	Poland (POL)	1	1	2	4
15	Brazil (BRA)	1	1	0	2
16	Finland (FIN)	1	0	3	4
17	Jamaica (JAM)	1	0	0	1
17	Norway (NOR)	1	0	0	1
19	Spain (ESP)	0	3	4	7
20	Canada (CAN)	0	3	2	5
21	Netherlands (NED)	0	2	2	4
22	Japan (JPN)	0	2	0	2
23	Sweden (SWE)	0	1	1	2
24	Nigeria (NGR)	0	1	0	1
24	Turkey (TUR)	0	1	0	1
26	Australia (AUS)	0	0	3	3
27	Greece (GRE)	0	0	1	1
27	South Korea (KOR)	0	0	1	1
Totals (28 entries)		66	66	66	198
