= Rowing at the 2000 Summer Olympics – Men's coxless four =

Men's coxless four at the Games of the XXVII Olympiad
- Venue: Sydney International Regatta Centre
- Date: 17–23 September 2000
- Competitors: 52 from 13 nations
- Winning time: 5:56.24

Medalists
1st place, gold medalist(s)		James Cracknell; Steve Redgrave; Tim Foster; Matthew Pinsent	Great Britain
2nd place, silver medalist(s)		Valter Molea; Riccardo Dei Rossi; Lorenzo Carboncini; Carlo Mornati	Italy
3rd place, bronze medalist(s)		James Stewart; Ben Dodwell; Geoff Stewart; Bo Hanson	Australia

The men's coxless four competition at the 2000 Summer Olympics in Sydney, Australia took place at the Sydney International Regatta Centre.

== Competition format ==
This rowing event is a sweep rowing event, meaning that each rower has one oar and rows on only one side. Four rowers crew each boat, and no coxswain is used. The competition consists of multiple rounds. Finals were held to determine the placing of each boat; these finals were given letters with those nearer to the beginning of the alphabet meaning a better ranking. Semifinals were named based on which finals they fed, with each semifinal having two possible finals.

With 13 boats in with heats, the best boats qualify directly for the semi-finals. All other boats progress to the repechage round, which offers a second chance to qualify for the semi-finals. Unsuccessful boats from the repechage are eliminated from the competition. The best three boats in each of the two semi-finals qualify for final A, which determines places 1–6 (including the medals). Unsuccessful boats from semi-finals A/B go forward to final B, which determines places 7–12.

== Schedule ==
All times are Australian Time (UTC+10)

Date	Time	Round
Sunday, 17 September 2000	11:30	Heats
Tuesday, 19 September 2000	11:10	Repechages
Thursday, 21 September 2000	09:50	Semifinals
Friday, 22 September 2000	11:10	Final B
Saturday, 23 September 2000	10:30	Final

== Results ==
=== Heats ===
The first three boats of each heat advanced to the semifinals, remainder goes to the repechage.

==== Heat 1 ====
Rank	Rower	Country	Time	Notes
1	James Cracknell, Steve Redgrave, Tim Foster, Matthew Pinsent	Great Britain	6:01.58	Q
2	James Stewart, Ben Dodwell, Geoff Stewart, Bo Hanson	Australia	6:05.03	Q
3	Janez Klemenčič, Milan Janša, Rok Kolander, Matej Prelog	Slovenia	6:07.09	Q
4	Valeriu Andrunache, Adrian Bucenschi, Valentin Robu, Florin Corbeanu	Romania	6:14.00	R
5	Filip Filipić, Ivan Smiljanić, Boban Ranković, Mladen Stegić	FR Yugoslavia	6:16.46	R

==== Heat 2 ====
Rank	Rower	Country	Time	Notes
1	Valter Molea, Riccardo Dei Rossi, Lorenzo Carboncini, Carlo Mornati	Italy	6:04.59	Q
2	Michael Wherley, Eric Mueller, Jamie Koven, Wolfgang Moser	United States	6:07.36	Q
3	Kjetil Undset, Sture Bjørvig, Steffen Størseth, Nito Simonsen	Norway	6:13.14	Q
4	Paweł Jarosiński, Rafał Smoliński, Artur Rozalski, Arkadiusz Sobkowiak	Poland	6:22.00	R

==== Heat 3 ====
Rank	Rower	Country	Time	Notes
1	Daniel Fauché, Antoine Béghin, Laurent Béghin, Gilles Bosquet	France	6:08.57	Q
2	Dave Schaper, Scott Brownlee, Toni Dunlop, Rob Hellstrom	New Zealand	6:13.60	Q
3	Dirk Meusel, Jörg Dießner, Jan Herzog, Ike Landvoigt	Germany	6:13.62	Q
4	Hamdy El-Kot, El-Atek Mohamed, Tarek Hamid, Kamal Abdel Rehim	Egypt	6:21.10	R

=== Repechage ===
First three qualify to semifinals.

==== Repechage 1 ====
Rank	Rower	Country	Time	Notes
1	Filip Filipić, Ivan Smiljanić, Boban Ranković, Mladen Stegić	FR Yugoslavia	6:09.69	Q
2	Valeriu Andrunache, Adrian Bucenschi, Valentin Robu, Florin Corbeanu	Romania	6:11.24	Q
3	Hamdy El-Kot, El-Atek Mohamed, Tarek Hamid, Kamal Abdel Rehim	Egypt	6:13.73	Q
4	Paweł Jarosiński, Rafał Smoliński, Artur Rozalski, Arkadiusz Sobkowiak	Poland	6:15.75	

=== Semifinals ===
First three places advance to Final A, the remainder to Final B.

==== Semifinal 1 ====
Rank	Rower	Country	Time	Notes
1	James Cracknell, Steve Redgrave, Tim Foster, Matthew Pinsent	Great Britain	6:02.28	A
2	Janez Klemenčič, Milan Janša, Rok Kolander, Matej Prelog	Slovenia	6:04.07	A
3	Michael Wherley, Eric Mueller, Jamie Koven, Wolfgang Moser	United States	6:05.80	A
4	Daniel Fauché, Antoine Béghin, Laurent Béghin, Gilles Bosquet	France	6:07.77	B
5	Dirk Meusel, Jörg Dießner, Jan Herzog, Ike Landvoigt	Germany	6:15.12	B
6	Valeriu Andrunache, Adrian Bucenschi, Valentin Robu, Florin Corbeanu	Romania	6:15.14	B

==== Semifinal 2 ====
Rank	Rower	Country	Time	Notes
1	James Stewart, Ben Dodwell, Geoff Stewart, Bo Hanson	Australia	6:02.03	A
2	Valter Molea, Riccardo Dei Rossi, Lorenzo Carboncini, Carlo Mornati	Italy	6:02.31	A
3	Dave Schaper, Scott Brownlee, Toni Dunlop, Rob Hellstrom	New Zealand	6:05.33	A
4	Kjetil Undset, Sture Bjørvig, Steffen Størseth, Nito Simonsen	Norway	6:08.55	B
5	Filip Filipić, Ivan Smiljanić, Boban Ranković, Mladen Stegić	FR Yugoslavia	6:08.82	B
6	Hamdy El-Kot, El-Atek Mohamed, Tarek Hamid, Kamal Abdel Rehim	Egypt	6:21.22	B

=== Finals ===
==== Final B ====
Rank	Rower	Country	Time	Notes
1	Daniel Fauché, Antoine Béghin, Laurent Béghin, Gilles Bosquet	France	6:01.29	
2	Filip Filipić, Ivan Smiljanić, Boban Ranković, Mladen Stegić	FR Yugoslavia	6:01.54	
3	Kjetil Undset, Sture Bjørvig, Steffen Størseth, Nito Simonsen	Norway	6:04.28	
4	Valeriu Andrunache, Adrian Bucenschi, Valentin Robu, Florin Corbeanu	Romania	6:06.73	
5	Dirk Meusel, Jörg Dießner, Jan Herzog, Ike Landvoigt	Germany	6:08.11	
6	Hamdy El-Kot, El-Atek Mohamed, Tarek Hamid, Kamal Abdel Rehim	Egypt	6:08.37	

==== Final A ====
Rank	Rower	Country	Time	Notes
1st place, gold medalist(s)	James Cracknell, Steve Redgrave, Tim Foster, Matthew Pinsent	Great Britain	5:56.24	
2nd place, silver medalist(s)	Valter Molea, Riccardo Dei Rossi, Lorenzo Carboncini, Carlo Mornati	Italy	5:56.62	
3rd place, bronze medalist(s)	James Stewart, Ben Dodwell, Geoff Stewart, Bo Hanson	Australia	5:57.61	
4	Janez Klemenčič, Milan Janša, Rok Kolander, Matej Prelog	Slovenia	5:58.34	
5	Michael Wherley, Eric Mueller, Jamie Koven, Wolfgang Moser	United States	6:02.34	
6	Dave Schaper, Scott Brownlee, Toni Dunlop, Rob Hellstrom	New Zealand	6:09.13	
