= Rowing at the 1996 Summer Olympics – Men's coxless four =

Men's coxless four at the Games of the XXVI Olympiad
- Date: 21–27 July 1996
- Competitors: 56 from 14 nations

Medalists
1st place, gold medalist(s)		Nicholas Green; Drew Ginn; James Tomkins; Mike McKay	Australia
2nd place, silver medalist(s)		Bertrand Vecten; Olivier Moncelet; Daniel Fauché; Gilles Bosquet	France
3rd place, bronze medalist(s)		Gregory Searle; Jonathan William Searle; Rupert John Obholzer; Tim Foster	Great Britain

The men's coxless four competition at the 1996 Summer Olympics in Atlanta, Georgia took place at Lake Lanier.

== Competition format ==
This rowing event is a sweep rowing event, meaning that each rower has one oar and rows on only one side. Four rowers crew each boat, and no coxswain is used. The competition consists of multiple rounds. Finals were held to determine the placing of each boat; these finals were given letters with those nearer to the beginning of the alphabet meaning a better ranking. Semifinals were named based on which finals they fed, with each semifinal having two possible finals.

With 14 boats in with heats, the best boats qualify directly for the semi-finals. All other boats progress to the repechage round, which offers a second chance to qualify for the semi-finals. The boats finishing in the 2 last positions from the repechage are eliminated from the competition. The best three boats in each of the two semi-finals qualify for final A, which determines places 1–6 (including the medals). Unsuccessful boats from semi-finals A/B go forward to final B, which determines places 7–12.

== Results ==
=== Heats ===
The first three boats of each heat advanced to the semifinals, the remainder goes to the repechage.

==== Heat 1 ====
Rank	Rower	Country	Time	Notes
1	Valter Molea; Riccardo Dei Rossi; Raffaello Leonardo; Carlo Mornati	Italy	6:14.25	Q
2	Gabriel Marin; Dorin Alupei; Dimitrie Popescu; Vasile Măstăcan	Romania	6:18.03	Q
3	Halvor Sannes Lande; Odd-Even Bustnes; Olaf Tufte; Morten Bergesen	Norway	6:19.79	Q
4	Stefan Forster; Ike Landvoigt; Claas-Peter Fischer; Stefan Scholz	Germany	6:21.98	R
5	Daniel Scuri; Horacio Sicilia; Mariano Sosa; Mariano Kowalczyk	Argentina	6:33.29	R

==== Heat 2 ====
Rank	Rower	Country	Time	Notes
1	Gregory Searle; Jonathan William Searle; Rupert John Obholzer; Tim Foster	Great Britain	6:14.47	Q
2	Siniša Skelin; Sead Marušić; Igor Boraska; Tihomir Franković	Croatia	6:17.42	Q
3	Jacek Streich; Wojciech Jankowski; Piotr Olszewski; Piotr Basta	Poland	6:19.15	Q
4	Sean Hall; Jason Scott; Tom Murray; Jeff Klepacki	United States	6:20.72	R
5	Huang Xiaoping; Sun Jun; Liang Hongming; Liu Xianbin	China	6:30.16	R

==== Heat 3 ====
Rank	Rower	Country	Time	Notes
1	Nicholas Green; Drew Ginn; James Tomkins; Mike McKay	Australia	6:15.05	Q
2	Denis Žvegelj; Jani Klemenčič; Milan Janša; Sadik Mujkič	Slovenia	6:15.86	Q
3	Bertrand Vecten; Olivier Moncelet; Daniel Fauché; Gilles Bosquet	France	6:18.70	Q
4	Alastair Mackintosh; Ian Wright; Chris White; Scott Brownlee	New Zealand	6:30.03	R

=== Repechage ===
The first three boats of the Repechage advanced to the semifinals, the remainder are eliminated.

==== Repechage 1 ====
Rank	Rower	Country	Time	Notes
1	Stefan Forster; Ike Landvoigt; Claas-Peter Fischer; Stefan Scholz	Germany	6:29.10	Q
2	Huang Xiaoping; Sun Jun; Liang Hongming; Liu Xianbin	China	6:29.95	Q
3	Sean Hall; Jason Scott; Tom Murray; Jeff Klepacki	United States	6:30.95	Q
4	Alastair Mackintosh; Ian Wright; Chris White; Scott Brownlee	New Zealand	6:35.58	R
5	Daniel Scuri; Horacio Sicilia; Mariano Sosa; Mariano Kowalczyk	Argentina	6:37.85	R

=== Semifinals ===
The first three boats of the each semifinal advanced to the Final A, the remainder to Final B.

==== Semifinal 1 ====
Rank	Rower	Country	Time	Notes
1	Bertrand Vecten; Olivier Moncelet; Daniel Fauché; Gilles Bosquet	France	6:09.58	A
2	Valter Molea; Riccardo Dei Rossi; Raffaello Leonardo; Carlo Mornati	Italy	6:09.62	A
3	Nicholas Green; Drew Ginn; James Tomkins; Mike McKay	Australia	6:09.95	A
4	Siniša Skelin; Sead Marušić; Igor Boraska; Tihomir Franković	Croatia	6:12.40	B
5	Halvor Sannes Lande; Odd-Even Bustnes; Olaf Tufte; Morten Bergesen	Norway	6:15.17	B
6	Huang Xiaoping; Sun Jun; Liang Hongming; Liu Xianbin	China	6:25.79	B

==== Semifinal 2 ====
Rank	Rower	Country	Time	Notes
1	Gregory Searle; Jonathan William Searle; Rupert John Obholzer; Tim Foster	Great Britain	6:10.78	A
2	Gabriel Marin; Dorin Alupei; Dimitrie Popescu; Vasile Măstăcan	Romania	6:11.84	A
3	Denis Žvegelj; Jani Klemenčič; Milan Janša; Sadik Mujkič	Slovenia	6:13.14	A
4	Jacek Streich; Wojciech Jankowski; Piotr Olszewski; Piotr Basta	Poland	6:16.65	B
5	Sean Hall; Jason Scott; Tom Murray; Jeff Klepacki	United States	6:18.68	B
6	Stefan Forster; Ike Landvoigt; Claas-Peter Fischer; Stefan Scholz	Germany	6:19.06	B

=== Finals ===
==== Final B ====
Rank	Rower	Country	Time
1	Siniša Skelin; Sead Marušić; Igor Boraska; Tihomir Franković	Croatia	5:54.58
2	Halvor Sannes Lande; Odd-Even Bustnes; Olaf Tufte; Morten Bergesen	Norway	5:55.19
3	Stefan Forster; Ike Landvoigt; Claas-Peter Fischer; Stefan Scholz	Germany	5:57.77
4	Huang Xiaoping; Sun Jun; Liang Hongming; Liu Xianbin	China	5:58.22
5	Sean Hall; Jason Scott; Tom Murray; Jeff Klepacki	United States	5:59.19
6	Jacek Streich; Wojciech Jankowski; Piotr Olszewski; Piotr Basta	Poland	6:00.57

==== Final A ====
Rank	Rower	Country	Time
1st place, gold medalist(s)	Nicholas Green; Drew Ginn; James Tomkins; Mike McKay	Australia	6:06.37
2nd place, silver medalist(s)	Bertrand Vecten; Olivier Moncelet; Daniel Fauché; Gilles Bosquet	France	6:07.03
3rd place, bronze medalist(s)	Gregory Searle; Jonathan William Searle; Rupert John Obholzer; Tim Foster	Great Britain	6:07.28
4	Denis Žvegelj; Jani Klemenčič; Milan Janša; Sadik Mujkič	Slovenia	6:07.87
5	Gabriel Marin; Dorin Alupei; Dimitrie Popescu; Vasile Măstăcan	Romania	6:08.97
6	Valter Molea; Riccardo Dei Rossi; Raffaello Leonardo; Carlo Mornati	Italy	6:10.60
