= Rowing at the 2004 Summer Olympics – Men's coxless four =

Men's coxless four at the Games of the XXVIII Olympiad
- Competitors: 52 from 13 nations

Medalists
1st place, gold medalist(s)		Steve Williams; James Cracknell; Ed Coode; Matthew Pinsent	Great Britain
2nd place, silver medalist(s)		Cameron Baerg; Thomas Herschmiller; Jake Wetzel; Barney Williams	Canada
3rd place, bronze medalist(s)		Lorenzo Porzio; Dario Dentale; Luca Agamennoni; Raffaello Leonardo	Italy

These are the results of the Men's coxless four competition in Rowing at the 2004 Summer Olympics in Athens Greece. It was one of eight events in men's rowing that was held. The Rowing events were held at the Schinias Olympic Rowing and Canoeing Centre.

Gold:	Silver:	Bronze:
Great Britain; Steve Williams; James Cracknell; Ed Coode; Matthew Pinsent	Canada; Cameron Baerg; Thomas Herschmiller; Jake Wetzel; Barney Williams	Italy; Lorenzo Porzio; Dario Dentale; Luca Agamennoni; Raffaello Leonardo

== Heats ==
- SF denotes qualification to Semifinal.
- R denotes qualification to Repechage.

=== Heat 1 (August 14) ===
1. Canada (Cameron Baerg, Thomas Herschmiller, Jake Wetzel, Barney Williams) 6:26.38 SF
2. Poland (Jarosław Godek, Mariusz Daniszewski, Artur Rozalski, Rafal Smolinski) 6:30.72 SF
3. Czech Republic (Jakub Makovicka, Jan Schindler, Petr Vitásek, Karel Neffe Jr.) 6:31.23 SF
4. Croatia (Damir Vučičić, Igor Boraska, Petar Milin, Marko Dragičević) 6:34.05 R
5. Romania (Daniel Măstăcan, Florin Corbeanu, Ovidiu Cornea, Gheorghiţa Munteanu) 6:40.16 R

=== Heat 2 (August 14) ===
1. Great Britain (Steve Williams, James Cracknell, Ed Coode, Matthew Pinsent) 6:20.85 SF
2. Italy (Lorenzo Porzio, Dario Dentale, Luca Agamennoni, Raffaello Leonardo) 6:22.58 SF
3. Slovenia (Tomaž Pirih, Jani Klemenčič, Grega Sračnjek, Miha Pirih) 6:25.36 SF
4. United States (Garrett Klugh, Michael Wherley, Jamie Schroeder, Wolfgang Moser) 6:30.01 R

=== Heat 3 (August 14) ===
1. Australia (Dave McGowan, Rob Jahrling, Tom Laurich, David Dennis) 6:21.97 SF
2. New Zealand (Donald Leach, Mahé Drysdale, Carl Meyer, Eric Murray) 6:22.91 SF
3. Germany (Jochen Urban, Sebastian Thormann, Philipp Stüer, Bernd Heidicker) 6:33.14 SF
4. Russia (Sergey Matveyev, Vladimir Volodenkov, Yevgeny Zhigulin, Aleksandr Litvinchev) 6:36.93 R

== Repechage ==
- SF denotes qualification to Semifinal.

=== Repechage 1 (August 17) ===
1. Russia (Sergey Matveyev, Vladimir Volodenkov, Evgenij Jigulin, Aleksandr Litvinchev) 5:56.94 SF
2. United States (Garrett Klugh, Michael Wherley, Jamie Schroeder, Wolfgang Moser) 5:58.13 SF
3. Croatia (Damir Vucicic, Igor Boraska, Petar Milin, Marko Dragicevic) 5:58.48 SF
4. Romania (Daniel Măstăcan, Florin Corbeanu, Ovidiu Cornea, Gheorghita Munteanu) 6:00.10

== Semifinals ==
- FA denotes qualification to Final A.
- FB denotes qualification to Final B.

=== Semifinal A (August 18) ===
1. Canada (Cameron Baerg, Thomas Herschmiller, Jake Wetzel, Barney Williams) 5:50.68 FA
2. Australia (Dave McGowan, Rob Jahrling, Tom Laurich, David Dennis) 5:51.81 FA
3. Italy (Lorenzo Porzio, Dario Dentale, Luca Agamennoni, Raffaello Leonardo) 5:52.12 FA
4. Germany (Jochen Urban, Sebastian Thormann, Philipp Stüer, Bernd Heidicker) 5:54.45 FB
5. Czech Republic (Jakub Makovicka, Jan Schindler, Petr Vitásek, Karel Neffe Jr.) 5:55.81 FB
6. United States (Garrett Klugh, Michael Wherley, Jamie Schroeder, Wolfgang Moser) 5:56.78 FB

=== Semifinal B (August 18) ===
1. Great Britain (Steve Williams, James Cracknell, Ed Coode, Matthew Pinsent) 5:50.44 FA
2. New Zealand (Donald Leach, Mahé Drysdale, Carl Meyer, Eric Murray) 5:52.95 FA
3. Poland (Jarosław Godek, Mariusz Daniszewski, Artur Rozalski, Rafal Smolinski) 5:53.32 FA
4. Slovenia (Tomaž Pirih, Jani Klemenčič, Grega Sračnjek, Miha Pirih) 5:55.53 FB
5. Russia (Sergey Matveyev, Vladimir Volodenkov, Evgenij Jigulin, Aleksandr Litvinchev) 6:02.26 FB
6. Croatia (Damir Vucicic, Igor Boraska, Petar Milin, Marko Dragicevic) 6:05.54 FB

== Finals ==
=== Final A (August 21) ===
The defining moment of the regatta was Briton Matthew Pinsent winning his fourth consecutive Olympic gold medal, this time without legendary partner Steve Redgrave. The British men's coxless four, narrowly saw off the challenge of the World Champion Canadian. The final was stroke-for-stroke, with the lead changing hands and Great Britain won with a time of 6:06.98, 8 hundredths of a second faster than the Canadians. Pinsent later wept at the medal ceremony.

1. Great Britain (Steve Williams, James Cracknell, Ed Coode, Matthew Pinsent) 6:06.98
2. Canada (Cameron Baerg, Thomas Herschmiller, Jake Wetzel, Barney Williams) 6:07.06
3. Italy (Lorenzo Porzio, Dario Dentale, Luca Agamennoni, Raffaello Leonardo) 6:10.41
4. Australia (Dave McGowan, Rob Jahrling, Tom Laurich, David Dennis) 6:13.06
5. New Zealand (Donald Leach, Mahé Drysdale, Carl Meyer, Eric Murray) 6:15.47
6. Poland (Jarosław Godek, Mariusz Daniszewski, Artur Rozalski, Rafal Smolinski) 6:22.43

=== Final B (August 19) ===
1. Germany (Jochen Urban, Sebastian Thormann, Philipp Stüer, Bernd Heidicker) 5:48.52
2. Czech Republic (Jakub Makovicka, Jan Schindler, Petr Vitásek, Karel Neffe Jr.) 5:49.99
3. Slovenia (Tomaž Pirih, Jani Klemenčič, Grega Sračnjek, Miha Pirih) 5:50.59
4. United States (Garrett Klugh, Michael Wherley, Jamie Schroeder, Wolfgang Moser) 5:52.55
5. Russia (Sergey Matveyev, Vladimir Volodenkov, Evgenij Jigulin, Aleksandr Litvinchev) 5:53.58
6. Croatia (Damir Vucicic, Igor Boraska, Petar Milin, Marko Dragicevic) 5:57.36
