= Yugoslavia at the 2000 Summer Olympics =

FR Yugoslavia at the 2000 Summer Olympics
- Flag of FR Yugoslavia
- IOC code: YUG
- NOC: Yugoslav Olympic Committee

in Sydney
- Competitors: 109 (92 men and 17 women) in 14 sports
- Flag bearer: Vladimir Grbić
- Medals Ranked 44th: Gold 1 Silver 1 Bronze 1 Total 3

Summer Olympics appearances (overview)
- 1996; 2000; 2004

Other related appearances
- Yugoslavia (1920–1992 W); Serbia (1912, 2008–pres.); Croatia (1992–pres.); Slovenia (1992–pres.); Bosnia and Herzegovina (1992 S–pres.); Independent Olympic Participants (1992 S); North Macedonia (1996–pres.); Montenegro (2008–pres.); Kosovo (2016–pres.)

Athletes from the Federal Republic of Yugoslavia competed at the 2000 Summer Olympics in Sydney, Australia. 109 competitors, 92 men and 17 women, took part in 50 events in 14 sports. These would be the last Summer Games in which athletes from Montenegro and Serbia participated under the name of Yugoslavia. They would compete as Serbia and Montenegro at the 2004 Summer Olympics.

The final days of the Olympics were overshadowed by protests against Yugoslav president Slobodan Milošević, who was ultimately overthrown four days after the closing ceremony.

== Medalists ==
Medal	Name	Sport	Event
Gold	Yugoslavia men's national volleyball team: Vladimir Batez; Slobodan Boškan; Andrija Gerić; Nikola Grbić; Vladimir Grbić; Slobodan Kovač; Đula Mešter; Vasa Mijić; Ivan Miljković; Veljko Petković; Goran Vujević; Igor Vušurović	Volleyball	Men's tournament
Silver	Jasna Šekarić	Shooting	Women's 10 m air pistol
Bronze	Yugoslavia men's national water polo team: Aleksandar Ćirić; Danilo Ikodinović; Viktor Jelenić; Nikola Kuljača; Aleksandar Šapić; Dejan Savić; Aleksandar Šoštar; Petar Trbojević; Veljko Uskoković; Jugoslav Vasović; Vladimir Vujasinović; Nenad Vukanić; Predrag Zimonjić	Water polo	Men's tournament

== Athletics ==
Men
Track & road events

Athlete	Event	Heat		Quarterfinal		Semifinal		Final	
Athlete	Event	Result	Rank	Result	Rank	Result	Rank	Result	Rank
Siniša Peša	400 m hurdles	52.14	54	Did not advance					
Darko Radomirović	1500 m	3:43.57	33	Did not advance					
Aleksandar Raković	50 km walk	—N/a						3:49:16	11
Predrag Momirović; Milan Petaković; Miloš Sakić; Slobodan Spasić	4 × 100 metres	39.99	31	Did not advance					
Marko Janković; Siniša Peša; Branislav Stojanović; Slaviša Vraneš	4 × 400 metres	3:07.41	22	Did not advance					

Field events

Athlete	Event	Qualification		Final	
Athlete	Event	Distance	Position	Distance	Position
Danial Jahić	Long jump	7.85	21	Did not advance	
Zoran Đurđević	Triple jump	16.31	26	Did not advance	
Dragutin Topić	High jump	2.30	21	Did not advance	
Stevan Zorić	High jump	2.15	27	Did not advance	
Dragan Perić	Shot put	19.49	16	Did not advance	

Women
Track & road events

Athlete	Event	Heat		Quarterfinal		Semifinal		Final	
Athlete	Event	Result	Rank	Result	Rank	Result	Rank	Result	Rank
Vukosava Đapić	100 m	12.12	60	Did not advance					
Mila Savić	200 m	24.12	46	Did not advance					
Olivera Jevtić	5000 m	15:11:25	11 q	—N/a				DNF	
Sonja Stolić	5000 m	15:38.96	25	Did not advance					
Olivera Jevtić	10000 m	32:06.54	4 Q	—N/a				31:29.65	11
Vukosava Đapić; Bijana Mitrović; Elvira Pancić; Mila Savić	4 × 100 metres	42.02	21	Did not advance					
Vukosava Đapić; Tatjana Lojanica; Mila Savić; Jelena Stanisavljević	4 × 400 metres	3:37.99	20	Did not advance					

Field events

Athlete	Event	Qualification		Final	
Athlete	Event	Distance	Position	Distance	Position
Marija Martinović	Triple jump	13.49	22	Did not advance	

== Basketball ==
Team roster

FR Yugoslavia National Basketball Team roster
Players
Coaches

Pos.	No.	Name	Age – Date of birth	Height	Club	Ctr.
G	4	Dejan Bodiroga	27 – March 2, 1973	6 ft 8 in (2.03 m)	Panathinaikos	(Greece)
G	5	Predrag Danilović	30 – February 26, 1970	6 ft 8 in (2.03 m)	Kinder Bologna	(Italy)
F	13	Predrag Drobnjak	24 – October 27, 1975	6 ft 11 in (2.11 m)	Efes Pilsen	(Turkey)
C	15	Nikola Jestratijević	24 – July 9, 1976	6 ft 11 in (2.11 m)	Crvena zvezda	(Serbia and Montenegro)
G	10	Dragan Lukovski	25 – March 21, 1975	6 ft 2 in (1.88 m)	Crvena zvezda	(Serbia and Montenegro)
G	6	Saša Obradović	31 – January 29, 1969	6 ft 5 in (1.96 m)	Crvena zvezda	(Serbia and Montenegro)
PG	7	Igor Rakočević	22 – March 29, 1978	6 ft 4 in (1.93 m)	Crvena zvezda	(Serbia and Montenegro)
C	11	Željko Rebrača	28 – April 9, 1972	6 ft 11 in (2.11 m)	Panathinaikos	(Greece)
G	9	Vlado Šćepanović	24 – November 13, 1975	6 ft 5 in (1.96 m)	Efes Pilsen	(Turkey)
F	8	Predrag Stojaković	23 – June 9, 1977	6 ft 9 in (2.06 m)	Sacramento Kings	(United States)
C	12	Dragan Tarlać	27 – May 9, 1973	6 ft 11 in (2.11 m)	Olympiacos	(Greece)
C	14	Dejan Tomašević	27 – May 6, 1973	6 ft 10 in (2.08 m)	Budućnost Podgorica	(Serbia and Montenegro)

Head coach

- (Federal Republic of Yugoslavia) Željko Obradović

Legend

- (C) Team captain
- nat field describes country
  of last club
  before the tournament
- Age as of 17 September 2000

Group play

Pos	Team	Pld	W	L	PF	PA	PD	Pts	Qualification
1	Canada	5	4	1	433	373	+60	9 (Note: Head-to-head record: Canada 1–0 FR Yugoslavia)	Quarterfinals
2	(Federal Republic of Yugoslavia) FR Yugoslavia	5	4	1	372	338	+34	9	Quarterfinals
3	Australia (H)	5	3	2	408	407	+1	8 (Note: Head-to-head record: Australia 1-0 Russia)	Quarterfinals
4	Russia	5	3	2	367	328	+39	8	Quarterfinals
5	Spain	5	1	4	349	376	−27	6	9th place playoff
6	Angola	5	0	5	303	410	−107	5	11th place playoff

Source: FIBA archive
Rules for classification: 1) points; 2) head-to-head points; 3) head-to-head goal average; 4) head-to-head number of points scored.
(H) Hosts
Notes:

17 September
14:30

FR Yugoslavia	66–60	Russia
Scoring by half: 27–28, 39–32
Pts: Rebrača 18; Rebs: Drobnjak 6 Asts: Lukovski, Obradović 3 each		Pts: Panov 13; Rebs: 3 players, 5 each Asts: 3 players, 2 each

The Dome, Sydney
Attendance: 8,353

19 September
21:30

Australia	66–80	FR Yugoslavia
Scoring by half: 28–45, 38–35
Pts: Gaze 21; Rebs: Longley 5 Asts: Heal 6		Pts: Bodiroga 19; Rebs: Tomašević 8 Asts: Bodiroga 6

The Dome, Sydney
Attendance: 8,406

21 September
19:30

FR Yugoslavia	73–64	Angola
Scoring by half: 39–32, 34–32
Pts: Tomašević 17; Rebs: Tomašević 11; Asts: Lukovski 4		Pts: Chipongue 15; Rebs: Lutonda 6 Asts: Lutonda 6

The Dome, Sydney
Attendance: 8,391

23 September
11:30

Spain	65–78	FR Yugoslavia
Scoring by half: 30–32, 35–46
Pts: Herreros 16; Rebs: Dueñas 10; Asts: López, Rodríguez 3 each		Pts: Danilović 14; Rebs: Rebrača 6 Asts: Danilović 4

The Dome, Sydney
Attendance: 8,365

25 September
19:30

FR Yugoslavia	75–83	Canada
Scoring by half: 42–33, 33–50
Pts: Danilović 20; Rebs: Tarlać, Tomašević 7 each Asts: Lukovski 4		Pts: Nash 26; Rebs: Nash 8 Asts: Nash 8

The Dome, Sydney
Attendance: 8,398

Quarter–finals

28 September
20:00

FR Yugoslavia	63–76	Lithuania
Scoring by half: 32–37, 31–39
Pts: Stojaković 20; Rebs: Tomašević 8 Asts: Tomašević 2		Pts: Einikis 26; Rebs: Einikis 8 Asts: Jasikevičius 4

Sydney SuperDome, Sydney
Attendance: 14,260
Referees: Nikolaos Pitsilkas (Greece)
Renato Santos (Brazil)

== Boxing ==
Athlete	Event	Round of 32	Round of 16	Quarterfinals	Semifinals	Final	
Athlete	Event	Opposition Result	Opposition Result	Opposition Result	Opposition Result	Opposition Result	Rank
Geard Ajetović	Welterweight	Jangphonak (THA); L 9–9+	Did not advance				

== Canoeing ==
=== Sprint ===
Men

Athlete	Event	Heats		Semifinals		Final	
Athlete	Event	Time	Rank	Time	Rank	Time	Rank
Ognjen Filipović	K-1 500 m	1:43.097	3 Q	1:43.434	7	Did not advance	
Igor Kovacić; Jozef Soti; Saša Vujanić; Dragan Zorić	K-4 1000 m	3:04.432	6 Q	3:02.713	3 Q	3:02.316	9

Women

Athlete	Event	Heats		Semifinals		Final	
Athlete	Event	Time	Rank	Time	Rank	Time	Rank
Nataša Janić	K-1 500 m	1:54.395	8 Q	1:55.482	2 Q	2:16.506	4

== Fencing ==
One female fencer represented Yugoslavia in 2000.

Athlete	Event	Round of 64	Round of 32	Round of 16	Quarterfinal	Semifinal	Final / BM	
Athlete	Event	Opposition Score	Opposition Score	Opposition Score	Opposition Score	Opposition Score	Opposition Score	Rank
Tamara Savić-Šotra	Women's épée	Lesoil (NOR); W 15–8	Flessel-Colovic (FRA); L 9–15	Did not advance				

== Handball ==
- Team roster

- Dejan Perić
- Arpad Šterbik
- Petar Kapisoda
- Vladan Matić
- Nenad Peruničić
- Nedeljko Jovanović
- Igor Butulija
- Aleksandar Knežević
- Žikica Milosavljević
- Goran Đukanović
- Ratko Đurković
- Dragan Škrbić
- Ratko Nikolić
- Ivan Lapčević
- Nebojša Golić

- Head coach:Veselin Vujović

=== Group A ===
Pos	Team	Pld	W	D	L	GF	GA	GD	Pts	Qualification
1	Russia	5	4	0	1	129	121	+8	8	Quarterfinals
2	Germany	5	3	1	1	128	113	+15	7	Quarterfinals
3	FR Yugoslavia	5	3	0	2	130	127	+3	6	Quarterfinals
4	Egypt	5	3	0	2	122	115	+7	6	Quarterfinals
5	South Korea	5	1	1	3	128	131	−3	3	9th place game
6	Cuba	5	0	0	5	128	158	−30	0	11th place game

16 September 2000; 14:30	FR Yugoslavia	25–24	South Korea	Pavilion 2, Sydney; Referees: Hansson, Olsson (SWE)
16 September 2000; 14:30	Butulija, Jovanović 6	(12–10)	Paek, Yoon K-s. 6	Pavilion 2, Sydney; Referees: Hansson, Olsson (SWE)
16 September 2000; 14:30	2× (yellow card) 4× (suspension) 1× (red card)		3× (yellow card) 2× (suspension)	Pavilion 2, Sydney; Referees: Hansson, Olsson (SWE)

18 September 2000; 14:30	Egypt	22–25	FR Yugoslavia	Pavilion 2, Sydney; Referees: Gallego, Lamas (ESP)
18 September 2000; 14:30	Moemen 9	(14–11)	Škrbić 6	Pavilion 2, Sydney; Referees: Gallego, Lamas (ESP)
18 September 2000; 14:30	2× (yellow card) 1× (suspension)		4× (yellow card) 7× (suspension)	Pavilion 2, Sydney; Referees: Gallego, Lamas (ESP)

20 September 2000; 21:30	FR Yugoslavia	22–28	Germany	Pavilion 2, Sydney; Referees: Øie, Hogsnes (NOR)
20 September 2000; 21:30	Knežević 5	(11–13)	Kehrmann 7	Pavilion 2, Sydney; Referees: Øie, Hogsnes (NOR)
20 September 2000; 21:30	4× (yellow card) 3× (suspension)		2× (yellow card) 5× (suspension)	Pavilion 2, Sydney; Referees: Øie, Hogsnes (NOR)

22 September 2000; 11:30	FR Yugoslavia	33–26	Cuba	Pavilion 2, Sydney; Referees: Boye, Jensen (DEN)
22 September 2000; 11:30	three players 6	(16–10)	Uríos 7	Pavilion 2, Sydney; Referees: Boye, Jensen (DEN)
22 September 2000; 11:30	3× (yellow card) 9× (suspension) 1× (red card)		3× (yellow card) 6× (suspension) 1× (red card)	Pavilion 2, Sydney; Referees: Boye, Jensen (DEN)

24 September 2000; 21:30	Russia	27–25	FR Yugoslavia	Pavilion 2, Sydney; Referees: Garcia, Moréno (FRA)
24 September 2000; 21:30	Koksharov, Voronin 8	(14–12)	Butulija, Škrbić 6	Pavilion 2, Sydney; Referees: Garcia, Moréno (FRA)
24 September 2000; 21:30	3× (yellow card) 3× (suspension)		3× (yellow card) 2× (suspension)	Pavilion 2, Sydney; Referees: Garcia, Moréno (FRA)

Quarterfinal

26 September 2000; 19:30	FR Yugoslavia	26–21	France	Pavilion 2, Sydney; Referees: Boye, Jensen (DEN)
26 September 2000; 19:30	Jovanović, Škrbić 7	(10–9)	Anquetil 5	Pavilion 2, Sydney; Referees: Boye, Jensen (DEN)
26 September 2000; 19:30	3× (yellow card) 6× (suspension)		3× (yellow card) 3× (suspension)	Pavilion 2, Sydney; Referees: Boye, Jensen (DEN)

Semifinal

29 September 2000; 14:30	Russia	29–26	FR Yugoslavia	The Dome, Sydney; Referees: Kohout, Dolejš (CZE)
29 September 2000; 14:30	Koksharov 9	(14–15)	Đukanović 6	The Dome, Sydney; Referees: Kohout, Dolejš (CZE)
29 September 2000; 14:30	3× (yellow card) 8× (suspension)		3× (yellow card) 6× (suspension) 1× (red card)	The Dome, Sydney; Referees: Kohout, Dolejš (CZE)

Bronze medal game

30 September 2000; 19:30	FR Yugoslavia	22–26	Spain	The Dome, Sydney; Referees: Boye, Jensen (DEN)
30 September 2000; 19:30	Milosavljević, Škrbić 6	(9–12)	Ortega 7	The Dome, Sydney; Referees: Boye, Jensen (DEN)
30 September 2000; 19:30	3× (yellow card) 7× (suspension)		3× (yellow card) 7× (suspension)	The Dome, Sydney; Referees: Boye, Jensen (DEN)

== Judo ==
Athlete	Event	Round of 32	Round of 16	Quarterfinals	Semifinals	Repechage	Final / BM	
Athlete	Event	Opposition Result	Opposition Result	Opposition Result	Opposition Result	Opposition Result	Opposition Result	Rank
Mara Kovačević	Women's +78 kg	Bye	Oliver (BEL); L	Did not advance				

== Rowing ==
Athlete	Event	Heats		Repechage		Semifinals		Final	
Athlete	Event	Time	Rank	Time	Rank	Time	Rank	Time	Rank
Nikola Stojić; Đorđe Višacki	Men's pair	6:42.62	1 S	Bye		6:34.93	2 FA	6:38.70	5
Filip Filipić; Boban Ranković; Ivan Smiljanić; Mladen Stegić	Men's four	6:16.46	5 R	6:09.69	1 SA/B	6:08.82	5 FB	6:01.29	8

== Shooting ==
Men

Athlete	Event	Qualification		Final	
Athlete	Event	Points	Rank	Points	Rank
Goran Maksimović	50 m rifle prone	589	35	Did not advance	
Nemanja Mirosavljev	50 m rifle three positions	1161	15	Did not advance	
Nemanja Mirosavljev	10 m air rifle	587	27	Did not advance	
Stevan Pletikosić	50 m rifle prone	591	30	Did not advance	
Stevan Pletikosić	50 m rifle three positions	1156	29	Did not advance	
Stevan Pletikosić	10 m air rifle	583	38	Did not advance	

Women

Athlete	Event	Qualification		Final	
Athlete	Event	Points	Rank	Points	Rank
Aranka Binder	50 m rifle three positions	572	23	Did not advance	
Aranka Binder	10 m air rifle	392	15	Did not advance	
Aleksandra Ivošev	50 m rifle three positions	573	22	Did not advance	
Aleksandra Ivošev	10 m air rifle	391	20	Did not advance	
Jasna Šekarić	25 m pistol	577	17	Did not advance	
Jasna Šekarić	10 m air pistol	388	2 Q	486.5	Silver medal

== Swimming ==
Men

Athlete	Event	Heat		Semifinal		Final	
Athlete	Event	Time	Rank	Time	Rank	Time	Rank
Nebojša Bikić	50 m freestyle	23.57	43	Did not advance			
Miloš Cerović	200 m backstroke	2:09.07	43	Did not advance			
Milorad Čavić	100 m backstroke	58.25	42	Did not advance			
Milorad Čavić	100 m butterfly	DSQ		Did not advance			
Đorđe Filipović	20 m individual medley	2:09.28	48	Did not advance			
Nikola Kalabić	100 m freestyle	51.82	39	Did not advance			
Nikola Kalabić	200 m freestyle	1:54.75	41	Did not advance			
Vladan Marković	200 m butterfly	2:00.11	21	Did not advance			
Nikola Savčić	100 m breaststroke	1:04.64	42	Did not advance			

Women

Athlete	Event	Heat		Semifinal		Final	
Athlete	Event	Time	Rank	Time	Rank	Time	Rank
Duška Radan	50 m freestyle	27.70	53	Did not advance			
Marica Stražmešter	100 m backstroke	1:07.21	41	Did not advance			
Marica Stražmešter	200 m backstroke	2:22.59	31	Did not advance			

== Table tennis ==
Athlete	Event	Group stage		Round of 32	Round of 16	Quarterfinals	Semifinals	Final / BM	
Athlete	Event	Opposition Result	Opposition Result	Opposition Result	Opposition Result	Opposition Result	Opposition Result	Opposition Result	Rank
Slobodan Grujić	Singles	Akinlabi (NGR); W 3–0	Lee Chul-Seung (KOR); L 2–3	Did not advance					
Slobodan Grujić; Ilija Lupulesku	Doubles	Clarke (AUS); Plumb (AUS); W 2–0	Boll (GER); Roßkopf (GER); W 2–0	—N/a	Kim Taek-Soo (KOR); Oh Sang-Eun (KOR); L 0–3	Did not advance			

== Tennis ==
=== Men's doubles ===
Athlete	Event	Round of 32	Round of 16	Quarterfinals	Semifinals	Final / BM	
Athlete	Event	Opposition Score	Opposition Score	Opposition Score	Opposition Score	Opposition Score	Rank
Dušan Vemić; Nenad Zimonjić	Men's doubles	Clément (FRA); Escudé (FRA); L 2–6, 2–6	Did not advance				

== Volleyball ==
=== Men's team competition ===
- Team roster

- Vladimir Batez
- Slobodan Boškan
- Andrija Gerić
- Nikola Grbić
- Vladimir Grbić
- Slobodan Kovač
- Đula Mešter
- Vasa Mijić
- Ivan Miljković
- Veljko Petković
- Goran Vujević
- Igor Vušurović

- Head coach: Zoran Gajić

Pool B

Pos	Team	Pld	W	L	Pts	SW	SL	SR	SPW	SPL	SPR	Qualification
1	Italy	5	5	0	10	15	4	3.750	482	421	1.145	Quarterfinals
2	Russia	5	4	1	9	13	7	1.857	465	443	1.050	Quarterfinals
3	FR Yugoslavia	5	3	2	8	12	9	1.333	489	461	1.061	Quarterfinals
4	Argentina	5	2	3	7	7	11	0.636	409	446	0.917	Quarterfinals
5	South Korea	5	1	4	6	8	14	0.571	491	504	0.974	
6	United States	5	0	5	5	5	15	0.333	417	478	0.872	

17 September 2000; 12:30	Russia	3–1	FR Yugoslavia	Sydney Entertainment Centre; Attendance: 8,056
17 September 2000; 12:30	(19–25, 25–23, 25–23, 25–20)			Sydney Entertainment Centre; Attendance: 8,056

19 September 2000; 20:30	FR Yugoslavia	2–3	Italy	Sydney Showground Pavilion 4 Attendance: 8,199
19 September 2000; 20:30	(19–25, 25–19, 22–25, 33–31, 20–22)			Sydney Showground Pavilion 4 Attendance: 8,199

21 September 2000; 12:00	United States	0–3	FR Yugoslavia	Sydney Showground Pavilion 4 Attendance: 4,348
21 September 2000; 12:00	(15–25, 20–25, 23–25)			Sydney Showground Pavilion 4 Attendance: 4,348

23 September 2000; 12:05	FR Yugoslavia	3–1	Argentina	Sydney Showground Pavilion 4 Attendance: 4,656
23 September 2000; 12:05	(21–25, 25–15, 25–23, 25–22)			Sydney Showground Pavilion 4 Attendance: 4,656

25 September 2000; 14:30	South Korea	2–3	FR Yugoslavia	Sydney Entertainment Centre; Attendance: 8,149
25 September 2000; 14:30	(26–24, 20–25, 23–25, 25–19, 8–15)			Sydney Entertainment Centre; Attendance: 8,149

Quarterfinal

27 September 2000; 20:40	Netherlands	2–3	FR Yugoslavia	Sydney Entertainment Centre; Attendance: 8,149
27 September 2000; 20:40	(21–25, 25–18, 18–25, 32–30, 15–17)			Sydney Entertainment Centre; Attendance: 8,149

Semifinal

29 September 2000; 20:40	FR Yugoslavia	3–0	Italy	Sydney Entertainment Centre; Attendance: 8,577
29 September 2000; 20:40	(27–25, 34–32, 25–14)			Sydney Entertainment Centre; Attendance: 8,577

Final

1 October 2000; 14:30	Russia	0–3	FR Yugoslavia	Sydney Entertainment Centre; Attendance: 9,444
1 October 2000; 14:30	(22–25, 22–25, 20–25)			Sydney Entertainment Centre; Attendance: 9,444

== Water polo ==
=== Men's team competition ===
==== Premliniary round ====
Pos	Team	Pld	W	D	L	GF	GA	GD	Pts	Qualification
1	FR Yugoslavia	5	4	1	0	41	22	+19	9	Quarter Finals
2	Croatia	5	4	1	0	42	30	+12	9	Quarter Finals
3	Hungary	5	3	0	2	49	39	+10	6	Quarter Finals
4	United States	5	2	0	3	42	39	+3	4	Quarter Finals
5	Netherlands	5	1	0	4	34	55	−21	2	
6	Greece	5	0	0	5	22	45	−23	0	

Source: LA84
Rules for classification: 1) Points; 2) Head-to-head points; 3) Head-to-head goal difference; 4) Head-to-head goals scored; 5) Goal difference.

23 September 2000; 12:00	FR Yugoslavia	9–1	Netherlands	Ryde Aquatic Leisure Centre; Referees: Moliner Molins (ESP), Turcotte (CAN)
23 September 2000; 12:00	Score by quarters: 3–0, 3–1, 2–0, 1–0			Ryde Aquatic Leisure Centre; Referees: Moliner Molins (ESP), Turcotte (CAN)

24 September 2000; 14:30	United States	5–8	FR Yugoslavia	Ryde Aquatic Leisure Centre; Referees: Moliner Molins (ESP), Schwartz (ISR)
24 September 2000; 14:30	Score by quarters: 1–3, 2–2, 1–2, 1–1			Ryde Aquatic Leisure Centre; Referees: Moliner Molins (ESP), Schwartz (ISR)

25 September 2000; 19:15	FR Yugoslavia	10–3	Greece	Ryde Aquatic Leisure Centre; Referees: Kerr (AUS), Balfanbayev (KAZ)
25 September 2000; 19:15	Score by quarters: 4–2, 2–1, 3–0, 1–0			Ryde Aquatic Leisure Centre; Referees: Kerr (AUS), Balfanbayev (KAZ)

26 September 2000; 19:15	Croatia	4–4	FR Yugoslavia	Ryde Aquatic Leisure Centre; Referees: Dani (ITA), Afanasiev (RUS)*
26 September 2000; 19:15	Score by quarters: 1–2, 0–0, 2–1, 1–1			Ryde Aquatic Leisure Centre; Referees: Dani (ITA), Afanasiev (RUS)*

27 September 2000; 09:30	FR Yugoslavia	10–9	Hungary	Ryde Aquatic Leisure Centre; Referees: Kerr (AUS), Ludecke (GER)
27 September 2000; 09:30	Score by quarters: 3–3, 2–3, 3–2, 2–1			Ryde Aquatic Leisure Centre; Referees: Kerr (AUS), Ludecke (GER)

=== Quarterfinals ===
29 September 2000; 20:30	Australia	3–7	FR Yugoslavia	Ryde Aquatic Leisure Centre; Referees: Ludecke (GER), Turcotte (CAN)
29 September 2000; 20:30	Score by quarters: 1–2, 0–2, 1–2, 1–1			Ryde Aquatic Leisure Centre; Referees: Ludecke (GER), Turcotte (CAN)

=== Semifinals ===
30 September 2000; 15:45	Hungary	8–7	FR Yugoslavia	Ryde Aquatic Leisure Centre; Referees: Kerr (AUS), Ludecke (GER)
30 September 2000; 15:45	Score by quarters: 3–2, 2–3, 2–2, 1–0			Ryde Aquatic Leisure Centre; Referees: Kerr (AUS), Ludecke (GER)

=== Bronze medal match ===
1 October 2000; 15:00	Spain	3–8	FR Yugoslavia	Ryde Aquatic Leisure Centre; Referees: Tulga (TUR), Afanasiev (RUS)
1 October 2000; 15:00	Score by quarters: 1–2, 1–2, 1–2, 0–2			Ryde Aquatic Leisure Centre; Referees: Tulga (TUR), Afanasiev (RUS)

=== Roster ===
Bronze Medal

- Aleksandar Šoštar
- Nikola Kuljača
- Vladimir Vujasinović
- Predrag Zimonjić
- Petar Trbojević
- Dejan Savić
- Aleksandar Ćirić
- Aleksandar Šapić
- Veljko Uskoković
- Jugoslav Vasović
- Nenad Vukanić
- Viktor Jelenić
- Danilo Ikodinović

== Notes ==
- Wallechinsky, David (2004). The Complete Book of the Summer Olympics (Athens 2004 Edition). Toronto, Canada. ISBN 1-894963-32-6.
- International Olympic Committee (2001). The Results Archived 19 September 2002 at pandora.nla.gov.au. Retrieved 12 November 2005.
- Sydney Organising Committee for the Olympic Games (2001). Official Report of the XXVII Olympiad Volume 1: Preparing for the Games. Retrieved 20 November 2005.
- Sydney Organising Committee for the Olympic Games (2001). Official Report of the XXVII Olympiad Volume 2: Celebrating the Games Archived 31 July 2012 at the Wayback Machine. Retrieved 20 November 2005.
- Sydney Organising Committee for the Olympic Games (2001). The Results Archived 27 September 2007 at the Wayback Machine. Retrieved 20 November 2005.
- International Olympic Committee Web Site
- Serbian Olympic Committee
