= Dario Dentale =

Italian rower

Medal record

Men's rowing

Representing Italy

Olympic Games
Bronze medal – third place	2004 Athens	M2-

World Championships
Silver medal – second place	2005 Gifu	M8+
Silver medal – second place	2006 Eton	M8+

Dario Dentale (born 26 October 1982 in Castellamare di Stabia) is an Italian rower. He competed for Italy at the 2004 Summer Olympics, received a bronze medal in the men's coxless four event with Lorenzo Porzio, Luca Agamennoni and Raffaello Leonardo.

Dentale also competed for Italy at the 2008 Summer Olympics, placing 11th in the men's coxless pair event with Raffaello Leonardo. (Note: Giuseppe De Vita withdrew due to illness and was replaced by Dario Dentale.)
