= Barney Williams (rower) =

Canadian rower

Personal information
- Full name: Barney Guillermo Williams
- Born: March 13, 1977 (age 49) San Martín de los Andes, Argentina
- Spouse: Buffy-Lynne Williams
Medal record
Men's rowing
Representing Canada
Olympic Games
Silver medal – second place	2004 Athens	Men's coxless four

Barney Guillermo Williams (born March 13, 1977) is a Canadian rower who won a gold medal at the 2003 world championships in Milan and a silver in the same event at the 2004 Summer Olympics. He also has two wins and a second in the four in Rowing World Cup events.

== Biographical details ==
Born in the Argentine city of San Martín de los Andes, Williams was educated at Upper Canada College, the University of Victoria and then at Jesus College, University of Oxford where he was President of the Oxford University Boat Club. He studied at the University of Oxford from 2004 to 2006, completing a Diploma in Legal Studies and an MSc in Management Research. He rowed in the winning Blue Boat in the 2005 Oxford-Cambridge Boat Race and was the president of the victorious Oxford crew in the 2006 Boat Race. He is married to the Canadian rower Buffy-Lynne Williams, who won bronze in the women's eight at the 2000 Summer Olympics in Sydney Australia, and placed fourth in the women's pair at the 2004 Summer Olympics in Athens Greece.

== Achievements ==
- Olympic Medals: 1 Silver
- World Championship Medals: 1 Gold
- Boat Race Appearances: 2 (2 wins)

=== Olympic Games ===
- 2004 – Silver, Coxless Four (with Jake Wetzel, Thomas Herschmiller, Cameron Baerg)

=== World Championships ===
- 2003 – Gold, Coxless Four (with Jake Wetzel, Thomas Herschmiller, Cameron Baerg)
