= Bo Hanson (rower) =

Australian rower (born 1973)

Personal information
- Full name: Boden Joseph Hanson
- Born: 7 August 1973 (age 52) Port Kembla, New South Wales
- Education: Brisbane State High School

Sport
- Sport: Rowing
- Club: Queensland Uni Boat Club; UTS Haberfield Rowing Club
Medal record
Men's rowing
Representing Australia
Olympic Games
Bronze medal – third place	1996 Atlanta	Quadruple sculls
Bronze medal – third place	2000 Sydney	Coxless four
Bronze medal – third place	2004 Athens	Eight
World Rowing Championships
Silver medal – second place	St. Catharines 1999	M4-
Commonwealth Rowing Championships
Gold medal – first place	1994 Ontario	M4X
Junior World Rowing Championships
Silver medal – second place	Banyoles 1991	M4-

Boden Joseph "Bo" Hanson (born 7 August 1973 in Port Kembla, New South Wales) is a four time Australian Olympian rowing, three time Olympic medalist, specialist coaching consultant, corporate trainer and presenter. Hansen won his three bronze medals at the Atlanta (1996), Sydney (2000) and Athens (2004) Olympic games His professional career includes founding high-performance consultancy Athlete Assessments in 2007, and Team8 which presents to corporate audiences.

== Sporting career ==
=== Club and state rowing ===
Hanson was educated at Brisbane State High School where he took up rowing.

Hanson's first state senior representation came in 1993 when he was selected to stroke the Queensland men's senior eight contesting the King's Cup at the Australian Rowing Championships. He raced in further Queensland King's Cup eights in 1994, 1996, 1997, 1998, 1999, 2000, 2001, 2002, 2003 and 2004 and he stroked those crews on several occasions.

Hanson first contested national titles at the Australian Rowing Championships in 1991 when he won both the U19 pair and the U19 coxed four national championships in Brisbane Grammar Old Boys crews. In 1994 he contested the national single sculls title in University of Queensland Boat Club colours. Later when he relocated to Sydney he rowed from the UTS Haberfield Rowing Club.

=== International representative rowing ===
Hanson's Australian representative debut was in 1991 at Junior World Rowing Championships in Banyoles Spain when he raced in the Australian junior coxless four who took the silver medal.

At the Barcelona Olympics in 1992, Bo Hanson made his Olympic debut becoming Australia's the youngest-ever rowing Olympian still aged eighteen. He rowed in the seven seat of the Australian men's eight who made the Olympic final and finished in fifth place. He held a seat in the Australian eight into 1993 and competed at the 1993 World Rowing Championships where the eight placed fourth.

In 1994 Hanson moved into Australian representative sculling crews. He was selected at stroke in the men's quad scull who competed at the 1994 World Rowing Championships in Indianapolis to a fourth place. Hanson and Duncan Free were constant in the quad into 1995 and were joined by Ron Snook with Hanson retaining the stroke seat. They finished in eight place at the 1995 World Rowing Championships. Hanson competed in his second Olympic Games at Atlanta 1996 where he won a bronze medal in the quadruple sculls with Snook, Free and Janusz Hooker new to the bow seat.

Hanson took a break after Atlanta and then moved back into sweep oared boats in 1998 and again into representative contention. Australia's prominent crew of the early nineties, the Oarsome Foursome were in their first year of a post Olympics comeback in 1998 and they raced in coxed boats. Together with Ben Dodwell and the twins Geoff and James Stewart, Hansen moved into the Australian men's coxless four with their eyes on a 2000 Olympics campaign. They were up against the gun British foursome including Steve Redgrave and Matthew Pinsent. At the 1998 World Rowing Championships Hanson and the Australian coxless four finished in fourth place. At the 1999 World Championships in St Catharines Canada, they won a silver medal behind Great Britain.

Hanson, Dodwell and the Stewarts remained together into the 2000 Olympic year and in the lead-up they rowed at two World Rowing Cups in Europe. At Sydney 2000 with Hanson at stroke they again came up against the same champion British four they'd met in 1998 - Redgrave, Pinsent, James Cracknell and Tim Foster. The British went out the fast in the first 500m and maintained the lead thereafter. The Italians got into 2nd place in the second 500m and also held that spot. The Australians left their run till the 3rd 500m and could never recover to better than third place. The Australian's took bronze and Redgrave's fairytale five Olympic gold medal came true.

In the next Olympiad Hanson didn't compete at a single World Championship or World Cup although he continued to row at the elite national level. He was selected for the 2004 Athens Olympics in the six seat of Australian men's eight who took the bronze medal in Athens. It was Hansen's last representative appearance.

== High performance consultant and presenter ==
During the later stages of his career, Bo attempted to understand how his behaviour related to his training, racing and performance results. Hanson studied the DISC behavioural theory, the Myers Briggs Personality Type Indicator, Emotional Intelligence and Neuro Linguistic Programming (NLP). Using DISC behavioral profiling, Hansen found his last years of rowing more enjoyable and successful.

=== Athlete Assessments ===
Hanson commenced a professional career post-rowing using the experiences gained at the Olympics as well as formal university education, and training and development qualifications. With a team of sports coaches, IT developers and other DISC accredited professionals, Hansen developed AthleteDISC, and started the business Athlete Assessments in 2007. That business developed the first sports version of DISC theory and behaviour profiling. CoachDISC, a similar tool specifically for sports coaches, followed in early 2009. After client requests, in early 2011 the ManagerDISC was launched as a development tool specifically for sports managers and administrators. Assessments created the first online sports-specific behavioural profiling tools for athletes, sports teams and coaches. Hanson is accredited in the use and administration of the Myers–Briggs Type Indicator, DISC Profiling and Emotional Intelligence (Emotional Competence Inventory 360).

=== Team8 ===
In the business Team8, Hanson trains and presents to clients such as American Express, Bain Consulting, Commonwealth Bank, ANZ, Macquarie Bank, Insurance Australia Group and Telstra. Hanson's presentations include leadership development and all aspects of teamwork - goal setting, team attitudes and communication. Hanson draws unique parallels between the world of elite sport and high performance business.

=== Fitzroy Australia Resources ===
Commencing in September 2019, Bo began presenting a series of team leadership modules in partnership with Fitzroy Australia Resources to their Carborough Downs colliery employees.
