= Toni Dunlop =

New Zealand rower (born 1969)

Personal information
- Nationality: New Zealand
- Born: Toni James Dunlop; 3 November 1969 (age 57) Invercargill, New Zealand
- Height: 191 cm (6 ft 3 in)
- Weight: 96 kg (212 lb)

Toni James Dunlop (born 3 November 1969) is a New Zealand rower and has represented New Zealand three times at the Olympics.

Dunlop was born in 1969 in Invercargill, New Zealand. He represented New Zealand at the 1992 Summer Olympics in the coxed four, where the team was completed by Bill Coventry, Guy Melville, Ian Wright, and Carl Sheehan (cox). Of the twelve teams, they came eleventh. He represented New Zealand at the 1996 Summer Olympics where he came fifth in the coxless pair with Dave Schaper. He represented New Zealand at the 2000 Summer Olympics in the coxless four. The team, which included Scott Brownlee, Dave Schaper, and Rob Hellstrom, came sixth. He is listed as New Zealand Olympian athlete number 610 by the New Zealand Olympic Committee.
