= Sture Bjørvig =

Norwegian rower

Personal information
- Nationality: Norwegian
- Born: 5 November 1973 (age 52) Trondheim, Norway

Sport
- Sport: Rowing

Sture Bjørvig (born 5 November 1973) is a Norwegian competition rower. He was born in Trondheim, but represented the club Norske Studenters RK. He competed at the 2000 Summer Olympics in Sydney, where he placed ninth in coxless fours, together with Kjetil Undset, Steffen Størseth and Nils-Torolv Simonsen.
