= Nils-Torolv Simonsen =

Norwegian rower

Nils-Torolv "Nito" Herstad Simonsen (born 25 April 1979) is a Norwegian competition rower. He was born in Oslo and represented the club Norske Studenters RK. He competed at the 2000 Summer Olympics in Sydney, where he placed ninth in coxless fours, together with Kjetil Undset, Steffen Størseth and Sture Bjørvig. At the 2004 Summer Olympics in Athens he placed seventh in double sculls, together with Morten Adamsen.
