= Dave Schaper =

New Zealand rower (born 1973)

Personal information
- Nationality: New Zealand
- Born: David Siegmund Schaper; 24 July 1973 (age 53) Ashburton, New Zealand
- Height: 194 cm (6 ft 4 in)
- Weight: 96 kg (212 lb)

David Siegmund Schaper (born 24 July 1973) is a New Zealand rower.

Schaper was born in 1973 in Ashburton, New Zealand. He represented New Zealand at the 1996 Summer Olympics where he came fifth in the coxless pair with Toni Dunlop. He represented New Zealand at the 2000 Summer Olympics in the coxless four. The team, which included Scott Brownlee, Toni Dunlop, and Rob Hellstrom, came sixth. He is listed as New Zealand Olympian athlete number 739 by the New Zealand Olympic Committee.
