= Różalski =

Różalski, feminine: Różalska is a Polish surname. Notable people with the surname include:

- Antoni Różalski (born 1952), Polish biologist, professor
- Artur Rozalski, Polish rower
- Jakub Różalski, Polish artist
- Marcin Różalski (born 1978), Polish kickboxer
- Ziggy Rozalski, Polish American boxing manager and promoter
