= Ben Dodwell =

Australian rower

Personal information
- Full name: Benjamin Philip Dodwell
- Born: 17 April 1972 (age 54) Melbourne, Australia
- Education: Melbourne Grammar School

Sport
- Sport: Rowing
- Club: Mercantile Rowing Club; UTS Haberfield Rowing Club
Medal record
Men's rowing
Representing Australia
Olympic Games
| Bronze medal – third place | 2000 Sydney | Coxless four |
World Rowing Championships
| Silver medal – second place | 1999 St. Catharines | M4- |
Commonwealth Rowing Championships
| Silver medal – second place | 1994 Ontario | M4- |

Benjamin Philip Dodwell (born 17 April 1972 in Melbourne) is an Australian former rower - a nine-time national champion, a triple Olympian, Olympic medal winner and representative at World Rowing Championships.

== Club and state rowing ==
Dodwell was educated at Melbourne Grammar School where he took up rowing. He rowed in the school's first VIII of 1988. Four years later he would be competing at the Barcelona Olympics. From school he joined the Mercantile Rowing Club in Melbourne. Later during his Australian representative period he would row from the UTS Haberfield Rowing Club in Sydney.

Dodwell's first state representation came in 1990 when he was selected in the Victorian youth eight who contested and won the Noel F Wilkinson Trophy at the Interstate Regatta in the Australian Rowing Championships. In 1992 he was selected in the Victorian senior men's eight to race for the King's Cup at the Interstate Regatta. He raced in further King's Cup eights in 1993, 1994, 1995, 1996, 1998, 1999 and 2000. He enjoyed a particular period of Victorian dominance winning every King's Cup he contested excepting 1999.

In Mercantile Rowing Club colours he contested national titles at the Australian Rowing Championships on a number of occasions. He achieved a third place in the national men's coxless pair in 1992 and in 1993 he won that Australian championship title in the coxless pair.

In 2010 Dodwell was inducted as a member of the Rowing Victoria Hall of Fame.

== International representative rowing ==
Dodwell's Australian representative debut was at the Barcelona Olympics in 1992 at aged twenty in his first year of senior club and state rowing. He rowed in the five seat of the Australian men's eight who made the Olympic final and finished in fifth place. He held a seat in the Australian eight into 1993 and competed at the 1993 World Rowing Championships where the eight placed fourth.

In 1994 Dodwell was selected to stroke the men's coxless four who competed at the 1994 World Rowing Championships in Indianapolis for an eleventh place finish. In 1995 he moved back into the Australian men's eight who finished in eleventh place at the World Championships in Tampere. He held his seat at six in the eight and competed in his second Olympic Games at Atlanta 1996 for a sixth place finish.

Dodwell took a representative break after Atlanta and then moved back into selection contention in 1998. Australia's prominent crew of the early nineties, the Oarsome Foursome were in their first year of a post Olympics comeback in 1998 and had moved into coxed boats. Together with Bo Hanson and the twins Geoff and James Stewart, Dodwell took seats in the Australian men's coxless four with their eyes on a 2000 Olympics campaign. They were up against the gun British foursome including Steve Redgrave and Matthew Pinsent. At the 1998 World Rowing Championships Dodwell and the Australian coxless four finished in fourth place. At the 1999 World Championships in St Catharines Canada, they won a silver medal behind Great Britain.

Dodwell, Hanson and the Stewarts remained together into the 2000 Olympic year and in the lead-up they rowed at two World Rowing Cups in Europe. At Sydney 2000 they again came up against the same champion British four they'd met in 1998 - Redgrave and Pinsent with James Cracknell and Tim Foster. The British went out the fast in the first 500m and maintained the lead throughout. The Italians got into 2nd place in the second 500m and also held that spot. The Australians left their run till the 3rd 500m and could never recover to better than third place. The Australian's took bronze and Redgrave's fairytale five Olympic gold medal came true. It was a fitting final representative performance for Dodwell in his home country Olympics.
