= Jarosiński =

Jarosiński (masculine) or Jarosińska (feminine) (plural: Jarosińscy) is a Polish-language surname. Notable people with the surname include:

- Eric Jarosinski (born 1971), American Germanist, author, humorist, and public speaker
- Łukasz Jarosiński (born 1988), Polish footballer
- Małgorzata Jarosińska-Jedynak (born 1979), Polish statesperson and engineer
- Monika Jarosińska (born May 28, 1974), Polish actress and singer
- Paweł Jarosiński (born 7 July 1975), Polish rower
