= Ivan Smiljanić =

Ivan Smiljanić may refer to:

- Ivan Smiljanić (rower), Serbian rower
- Ivan Smiljanić (basketball), Serbian basketball player
- Ivan Smiljanić (basketball, born 1971), Serbian basketball coach
