= James Stewart (rower) =

Australian rower

James Alexander Stewart
Personal information
- Nationality: Australian
- Born: 15 December 1973 (age 52) Sydney
- Education: Newington College
- Occupation: School teacher
Medal record
Men's rowing
Representing Australia
Olympic Games
Bronze medal – third place	2000 Sydney, AUS	M4-
Bronze medal – third place	2004 Athens, GRE	8+
World Rowing Championships
Silver medal – second place	1999 St. Catharines, CAN	M4-
Bronze medal – third place	1997 Lac d'Aiguebelette, FRA	M8+
World Rowing U23 Championships
Gold medal – first place	1995 Groningen, NED	M2-
Silver medal – second place	1994 Paris, FRA	M2-

James Alexander Stewart (born 15 December 1973) is an Australian former rower - a national champion, an U23 world champion and a three-time Olympian.

== Rowing brothers ==
James's twin brother Geoff was also a three time Olympic rower (1996, 2000, 2004). Their younger brother Stephen rowed at the 2004 and 2008 Olympics. They became the first trio of brothers to represent Australia in rowing at the same Olympics when they all rowed at Athens 2004 to a bronze medal in the men's eight. The brothers were all educated at Newington College (1984–1991), and took up rowing coached by Olympian and fellow Old Newingtonian Michael Morgan and deputy headmaster Robert Buntine.

During his representative rowing career, Stewart won six World Championship or Olympic medals. In each of these instances, he competed alongside his brother, Geoff Stewart, who received the same medals.

== Club and state rowing ==
James Stewart's senior club rowing was from the UTS Haberfield Rowing Club on Sydney's Iron Cove.

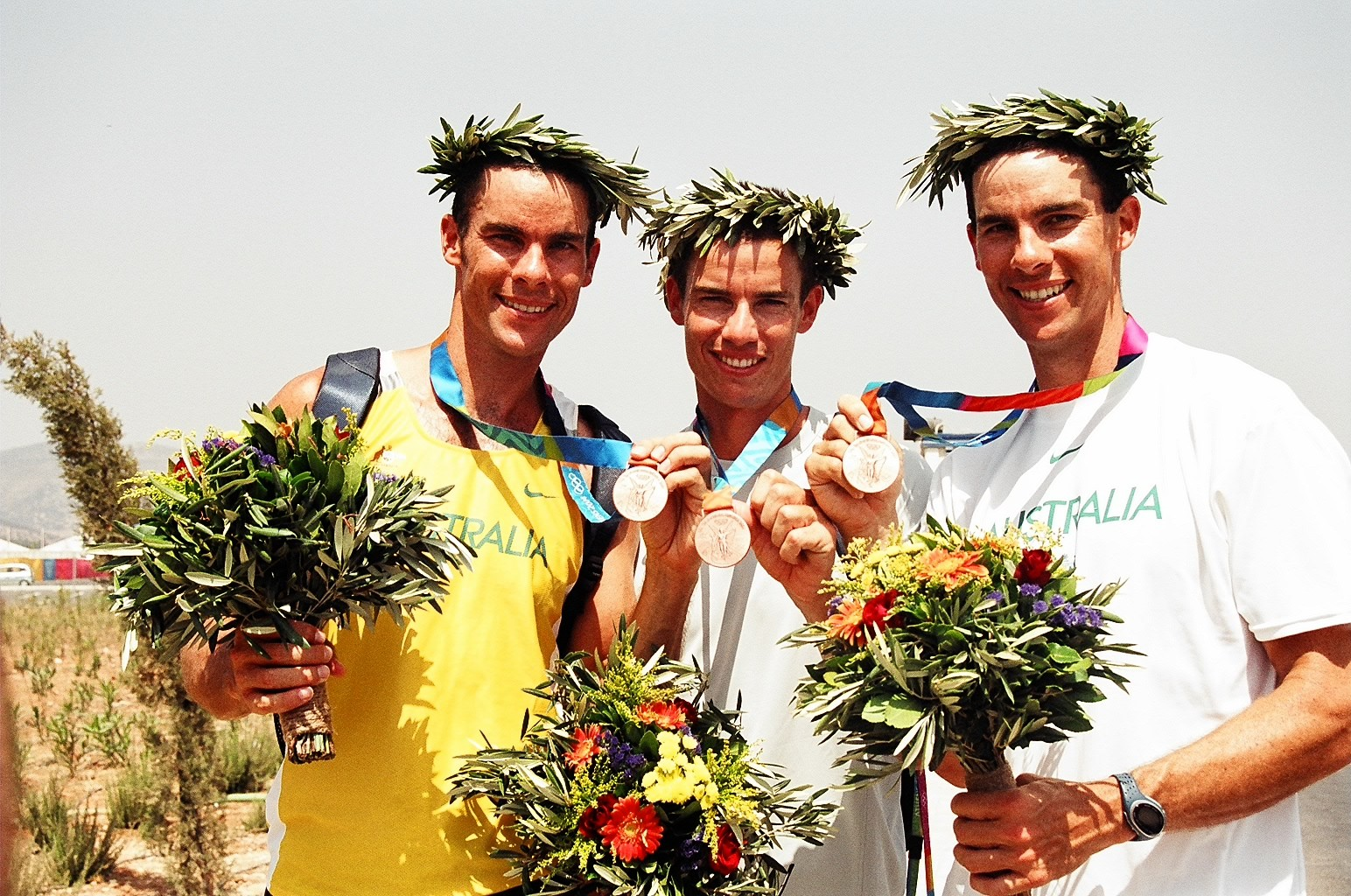
Stewart Brothers Bronze medallists, Athens Olympics

Stewart's first state representative selection for New South Wales came in 1992 in the youth eight who contested and won the Noel F Wilkinson Trophy at the Interstate Regatta within the Australian Rowing Championships From 1994 to 2004 he rowed in eleven consecutive New South Wales men's senior eights competing for the King's Cup at the Interstate Regatta. Only the 2004 crew was victorious, with the Stewart brothers suffering a long period of Victorian King's Cup dominance.

== International representative rowing ==
James made his Australian representative debut in 1994 competing at the World Rowing U23 Championships in Paris in a coxless pair with his twin brother Geoff. They rowed to a silver medal 1/3 of a second behind the winning Italians. In 1995 at the World Rowing U23 Championships in Groningen the brothers took the gold medal in the coxless pair.

In 1996, James and Geoffrey were seated as the bow pair of the Australian men's eight who competed in at the Atlanta Olympics. That crew made the A final, but placed sixth. The brothers continued rowing at the highest level into 1997 and raced in the senior men's eight at two World Rowing Cups and at the 1997 World Rowing Championships in Aigubelette, France. James was in the five seat of the eight for their bronze medal result in the final. Their 1997 international season also included a campaign at the Henley Royal Regatta where as an Australian Institute of Sport crew they contested and won the 1997 Grand Challenge Cup.

In 1998, Australia's Oarsome Foursome were in their first year of a post-Olympic comeback and they raced in various coxed combinations at the 1998 World Rowing Championships in Cologne. This enabled the Stewart brothers with Bo Hanson and Ben Dodwell to boat as the coxless four. They contested two World Rowing Cups that year in Europe and at the World Championships came up against the gun British crew of James Cracknell, Tim Foster, Matthew Pinsent and Steve Redgrave. The Australian four fared admirably to finish in fourth place in the final, 0.19 seconds behind the French silver medallists.

The Stewart brothers and the Australian 1998 coxless four stayed together in 1999 and raced at the World Rowing Cup III in Lucerne. But the bulk of champion British four also rowed on and at the 1999 World Rowing Championships in St Catharines, the Australian crew won their heat and semi final. In the final they met the British four of Cracknell, Pinsent, Redgrave and Ed Coode who foreshadowed what was planned for the Olympic Games and took the gold with James Stewart and the Australians winning silver.

Dodwell, Hanson and the two Stewart brothers held their seats and their combination into the 2000 Olympic year. They raced at two World Rowing Cups in Europe and then at the Sydney 2000 Olympics they again came up against the same champion British four they'd met in 1998. The British went out the fastest in the first 500m and maintained the lead thereafter. The Italians got into 2nd place in the second 500m and also held that spot. The Australians left their run till the 3rd 500m and could never recover to better than third place. The Australians took bronze and Steve Redgrave's fairytale five Olympic gold medals came true.

In the new Olympiad James Stewart didn't represent internationally at any World Championships or World Cups but he timed his 2004 Olympic selection run perfectly and for the 2004 Athens James and Geoff were seated in the engine room of the Australian men's eight at four and five with their brother Stephen stroking the crew. They raced well to a bronze medal.
