= Matej Prelog =

Slovenian rower

Personal information
- Born: 13 March 1980 (age 46)
Medal record
Men's rowing
Representing Slovenia
World Rowing Championships
Bronze medal – third place	2001 Lucerne	Coxless four
Silver medal – second place	2005 Kaizu, Gifu	Quad sculls
Mediterranean Games
Bronze medal – third place	2005 Almería	Double Sculls

Matej Prelog (born 13 March 1980 in Maribor) is a Slovenian rower, who represented his native country at the 2000 Summer Olympics (Sydney, Australia) in the Men's Coxless Four, alongside Janez Klemenčič, Milan Janša, and Rok Kolander.
