= Fahrenkrog =

Fahrenkrog is a German surname. Notable people with the surname include:

- Joy Fahrenkrog (born 1979), American archer
- Ludwig Fahrenkrog (1867–1952), German painter, illustrator, sculptor, and writer

== See also ==
- Jörn-Uwe Fahrenkrog-Petersen (born 1960), German musician
