= Marko Dragičević =

Croatian rower

Personal information
- Nationality: Croatian
- Born: 30 November 1976 (age 48); Zadar, Yugoslavia

Sport
- Sport: Rowing

Marko Dragičević (born 30 November 1976) is a Croatian rower. He competed in the men's coxless four event at the 2004 Summer Olympics.
