= Jan Schindler =

Czech rower

Personal information
- Born: 4 September 1978 (age 47) Cheb, the Czech Republic
- Height: 197 cm (6 ft 6 in)
- Weight: 103 kg (227 lb)

Sport
- Sport: Rowing
Medal record
Men's rowing
Representing the Czech Republic
European Rowing Championships
Gold medal – first place	2007 Poznań	Eight

Jan Schindler (born 4 September 1978) is a Czech rower. He competed at the 2004 Summer Olympics in Athens with the men's coxless four where they came eighths.
