= Stefan Scholz =

German rower (born 1964)

Personal information
- Nationality: German
- Born: 23 September 1964 (age 61) Berlin, Germany

Sport
- Sport: Rowing
Medal record
Representing West Germany
Summer Universiade
Bronze medal – third place	1989 Duisburg	Eights
World Championships
Silver medal – second place	1990 Tasmania	Coxed fours
Representing Germany
World Championships
Gold medal – first place	1993 Racice	Eights
Bronze medal – third place	1991 Vienna	Coxless fours

Stefan Scholz (born 23 September 1964) is a German rower. He competed in the men's coxless four event at the 1996 Summer Olympics.
