= Adrian Bucenschi =

Romanian rower

Personal information
- Nationality: Romanian
- Born: 13 November 1974 (age 50); Bucharest, Romania

Sport
- Sport: Rowing

Adrian Bucenschi (born 13 November 1974) is a Romanian rower. He competed in the men's coxless four event at the 2000 Summer Olympics.
