= El-Atek Mohamed =

Egyptian rower

Personal information
- Nationality: Egyptian
- Born: 29 October 1970 (age 54); Sawhag, Egypt

Sport
- Sport: Rowing

El-Atek Mohamed (born 29 October 1970) is an Egyptian rower. He competed in the men's coxless four event at the 2000 Summer Olympics.
