= Damir Vučičić =

Croatian rower

Personal information
- Born: 20 July 1977 (age 47); Split, Yugoslavia
- Height: 195 cm (6 ft 5 in)
- Weight: 100 kg (220 lb)

Sport
- Country: Croatia
- Sport: Rowing
- Club: HVK Gusar

Damir Vučičić (born 20 July 1977) is a Croatian rower. He competed in the men's coxless four event at the 2004 Summer Olympics.
