= Yevgeny Zhigulin =

Russian rower

Personal information
- Nationality: Russian
- Born: 28 June 1980 (age 44); Saint Petersburg, Russia

Sport
- Sport: Rowing

Yevgeny Zhigulin (born 28 June 1980) is a Russian rower. He competed in the men's coxless four event at the 2004 Summer Olympics.
