= Gheorghița Munteanu =

Romanian rower

Gheorghiţa Munteanu
Personal information
- Nationality: Romanian
- Born: 3 September 1980 (age 46) Vaslui, Romania

Sport
- Sport: Rowing

Gheorghiţa Munteanu (born 3 September 1980) is a Romanian rower. He competed in the men's coxless four event at the 2004 Summer Olympics.
