= Arkadiusz Sobkowiak =

Polish rower

Personal information
- Full name: Arkadiusz Piotr Sobkowiak
- Born: 30 March 1973 (age 51); Strzelno, Poland
- Height: 189 cm (6 ft 2 in)
- Weight: 98 kg (216 lb)

Sport
- Sport: Rowing
- Club: RTW Bydgostia Kabel

Arkadiusz Piotr Sobkowiak (born 30 March 1973) is a Polish rower. He competed in the men's coxless four event at the 2000 Summer Olympics.
