= Mariano Sosa =

Argentine rower

Mariano Sosa Ribicich
Personal information
- Full name: Mariano Ernesto Sosa Ribicich
- Nationality: Argentine
- Born: 3 November 1975 (age 50)

Sport
- Sport: Rowing
Medal record
Representing Argentina
Pan American Games
Silver medal – second place	1995 Mar del Plata	Coxless fours
Bronze medal – third place	2011 Guadalajara	Coxless fours

Mariano Ernesto Sosa Ribicich (born 3 November 1975) is an Argentine rower. He competed in the men's coxless four event at the 1996 Summer Olympics.
