= Liu Xianbin (rower) =

Chinese rower

Personal information
- Nationality: Chinese
- Born: 17 May 1973 (age 52)

Sport
- Sport: Rowing

Liu Xianbin (born 17 May 1973) is a Chinese rower. He competed in the men's coxless four event at the 1996 Summer Olympics.
