= Ovidiu Cornea =

Romanian rower

Medal record

Men's rowing

Representing Romania

World Rowing Championships
Gold medal – first place	2001 Lucerne	M8+
Bronze medal – third place	1999 St. Catharines	M4+

Ovidiu Cornea (born 25 February 1980 in Făgăraș) is a Romanian competitive rower. He competed at the 2004 Summer Olympics in the men's coxless four event. At the 2001 World Rowing Championships he won a gold medal in the men's eight and at the 1999 World Rowing Championships he won a bronze medal in the coxed four event.

== See also ==
- Romania at the 2004 Summer Olympics
