= Odd-Even Bustnes =

Norwegian rower (born 1969)

Personal information
- Nationality: Norwegian
- Born: 17 November 1969 (age 55) Hamar, Norway

Sport
- Sport: Rowing

Odd-Even Bustnes (born 17 November 1969) is a Norwegian rower. He competed in the men's coxless four event at the 1996 Summer Olympics.
