= Mark Brownlee =

New Zealand rower (born 1942)

Personal information
- Born: 26 November 1942 (age 82); Christchurch, New Zealand
- Height: 188 cm (6 ft 2 in)
- Weight: 89 kg (196 lb)
- Relative(s): Gerry Brownlee (nephew); Scott Brownlee (son)

Sport
- Country: New Zealand
- Sport: Rowing

Mark Brownlee (born 26 November 1942) is a New Zealand rower.

== Biography ==
Brownlee was born in 1942 in Christchurch, New Zealand. Like all his brothers, he received his secondary education at St Bede's College. His son is Scott Brownlee, who is also an Olympic rower, and his nephew is Gerry Brownlee, a cabinet minister of the fifth National Government of New Zealand.

He represented New Zealand at the 1964 and 1968 Summer Olympics as a member of the eight. He is listed as New Zealand Olympian athlete number 161 by the New Zealand Olympic Committee. Brownlee works as a real estate agent at the Papanui office of Harcourts International.
