= Claas-Peter Fischer =

German rower

Personal information
- Nationality: German
- Born: 22 February 1968 (age 58) Bremerhaven, West Germany

Sport
- Sport: Rowing
Medal record
Representing West Germany
Summer Universiade
Bronze medal – third place	1989 Duisburg	Eights
Representing Germany
World Championships
Gold medal – first place	1991 Vienna	Eights

Claas-Peter Fischer (born 22 February 1968) is a German rower. He competed in the men's coxless four event at the 1996 Summer Olympics.
