= Tarek Hamid =

Egyptian rower

Personal information
- Nationality: Egyptian
- Born: 29 October 1969 (age 55); Al-Sharqiyah, Egypt

Sport
- Sport: Rowing

Tarek Hamid (born 29 October 1969) is an Egyptian rower. He competed in the men's coxless four event at the 2000 Summer Olympics.
