= Dirk Meusel =

German rower

Personal information
- Nationality: German
- Born: 11 December 1977 (age 48) West Berlin, West Germany

Sport
- Sport: Rowing

Dirk Meusel (born 11 December 1977) is a German rower. He competed in the men's coxless four event at the 2000 Summer Olympics where he finished 11th on the log. He won German national titles in 1998 and 2000 with the coxed fours and the eights respectively.
