= Petar Milin =

Croatian rower (born 1979)

Personal information
- Nationality: Croatian
- Born: 29 June 1979 (age 45); Zadar, Yugoslavia

Sport
- Sport: Rowing

Petar Milin (born 29 June 1979) is a Croatian rower. He competed in the men's coxless four event at the 2004 Summer Olympics.
