= Sun Jun (rower) =

Chinese rower

Personal information
- Nationality: Chinese
- Born: 4 January 1975 (age 50)

Sport
- Sport: Rowing

Sun Jun (born 4 January 1975) is a Chinese rower. He competed in the men's coxless four event at the 1996 Summer Olympics.
