= Valeriu Andrunache =

Romanian rower

Personal information
- Nationality: Romanian
- Born: 27 August 1976 (age 48); Cudalbi, Romania

Sport
- Sport: Rowing

Valeriu Andrunache (born 27 August 1976) is a Romanian rower. He competed in the men's coxless four event at the 2000 Summer Olympics.
