= Neil Chugani =

British rowing cox

Neil Chugani (born 16 January 1969) is a former cox for the GB rowing team. He won the gold medal at the 2001 World Rowing Championships in the Coxed Pair (with James Cracknell and Matthew Pinsent).

Chugani began his rowing career at St Catherine's College, Oxford, from there he coxed the victorious Oxford crew in the 1991 Boat Race. Also in 1991 he won the Ladies Plate at the Henley Royal Regatta and coxed the Great Britain men's eight to the gold medal at the Nations Cup in Sicily.

After retiring from rowing Chugani has held various senior roles, primarily in the media arena, including Group Chief Financial Officer and Executive Director at BBC Worldwide. In 2014 Helen Grant, Minister for Sport, Tourism & Equalities at the time appointed Chugani as board member of UK Sport. He also served as Interim Chief Executive Officer of British Rowing.
