= Bertrand Vecten =

French rower (born 1972)

Medal record

Men's rowing

Representing France

Olympic Games
Silver medal – second place	1996 Atlanta	Coxless four

World Rowing Championships
Silver medal – second place	1997 Aiguebelette	Coxless four

Bertrand Vecten (born 26 February 1972 in Compiègne) is a French rower.
