= Mariusz Daniszewski =

Polish rower

Personal information
- Nationality: Polish
- Born: 16 January 1979 (age 46); Ełk, Poland

Sport
- Sport: Rowing

Mariusz Daniszewski (born 16 January 1979) is a Polish rower. He competed in the men's coxless four event at the 2004 Summer Olympics.
