= Cudalbi =

- Commune
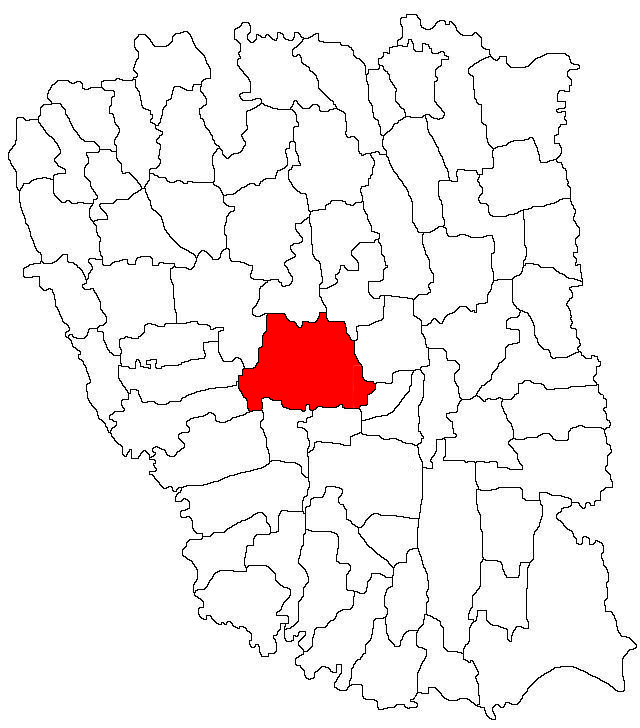
- Location in Galați County

- Location in Romania
- Coordinates: 45°47′N 27°42′E
- Country: Romania
- County: Galați

Government
  - Mayor (2024–2028): Petrică Marian Gheonea (PSD)
- Area: 138.19 km^{2} (53.36 sq mi)
- Elevation: 70 m (230 ft)
- Population (2021-12-01): 6,614
  - Density: 47.86/km^{2} (124.0/sq mi)
- Time zone: UTC+02:00 (EET)
  - Summer (DST): UTC+03:00 (EEST)
- Postal code: 807105
- Area code: (+40) 0236
- Vehicle reg.: GL
- Website: comunacudalbi.ro

Cudalbi is a commune in Galați County, Western Moldavia, Romania. It is composed of a single village, Cudalbi.

Historical population
Year	Pop.	±%
2002	8,181	—
2011	6,319	−22.8%
2021	6,614	+4.7%
Source: Census data

At the 2021 census, the commune had a population of 6,614; of those, 93.05% were Romanians.

== Natives ==
- Valeriu Andrunache (born 1976), rower
