= Piotr Olszewski =

Polish rower

Personal information
- Nationality: Polish
- Born: 25 April 1973 (age 51); Warsaw, Poland

Sport
- Sport: Rowing

Piotr Olszewski (born 25 April 1973) is a Polish rower. He competed in the men's coxless four event at the 1996 Summer Olympics.
