= Jason Scott (rower) =

American rower

Jason Scott OLY
Personal information
- Full name: Jason A. Scott
- Born: February 11, 1970 (age 56) Seattle, Washington, United States

Sport
- Sport: Rowing
Medal record
Representing United States
Pan American Games
| Silver medal – second place | 1991 Havana | Eights |

Jason A. Scott (born February 11, 1970) is an American rower. He competed in the men's coxless four event at the 1996 Summer Olympics.

Scott attended Newport High School in Bellevue, Washington before moving across the country to T. C. Williams High School in Alexandria, Virginia where he began rowing. He first rowed in college at Boston University before transferring to the University of Washington before his senior year.
