= Antoine Béghin =

French rower

Personal information
- Nationality: French
- Born: 31 May 1974 (age 50); Dinan, France

Sport
- Sport: Rowing

Antoine Béghin (born 31 May 1974) is a French rower. He competed in the men's coxless four event at the 2000 Summer Olympics.
