= Olivier Moncelet =

French rower

Medal record

Men's rowing

Representing France

Olympic Games
Silver medal – second place	1996 Atlanta	Coxless four

World Rowing Championships
Silver medal – second place	1997 Aiguebelette	M4-

Olivier Moncelet (born 5 December 1970) is a French rower.
