= Mariano Kowalczyk =

Argentine rower

Personal information
- Nationality: Argentine
- Born: 7 December 1971 (age 54)

Sport
- Sport: Rowing
Medal record
Representing Argentina
Pan American Games
Silver medal – second place	1995 Mar del Plata	Coxless pairs
Bronze medal – third place	1995 Mar del Plata	Coxed pairs

Mariano Tomás Kowalczyk (born 7 December 1971) is an Argentine rower. He competed in the men's coxless four event at the 1996 Summer Olympics.
