= Hamdy El-Kot =

Egyptian rower

Personal information
- Nationality: Egyptian
- Born: 10 February 1969 (age 56); Al-Buhayrah, Egypt

Sport
- Sport: Rowing

Hamdy El-Kot (born 10 February 1969) is an Egyptian rower. He competed in the men's coxless four event at the 2000 Summer Olympics.
