= Halvor Sannes Lande =

Norwegian rower

Personal information
- Nationality: Norwegian
- Born: 18 November 1973 (age 52) Oslo, Norway

Sport
- Sport: Rowing

Halvor Sannes Lande (born 18 November 1973) is a Norwegian rower. He competed in the men's coxless four event at the 1996 Summer Olympics.
