= Riccardo Dei Rossi =

Italian rower

Medal record

Men's rowing

Representing Italy

Olympic Games
| Silver medal – second place | 2000 Sydney | Coxless four |

World Rowing Championships
| Gold medal – first place | 1994 Indianapolis | M4- |
| Gold medal – first place | 1995 Tampere | M4- |
| Bronze medal – third place | 1998 Cologne | M4- |
| Bronze medal – third place | 1999 St. Catharines | M4- |

Riccardo Dei Rossi (born 6 February 1969) is an Italian rower.
