= Kamal Abdel Rehim =

Egyptian rower

Kamal Abdelrahim
Personal information
- Full name: Kamal Hassan Mohamed Abdelrahim
- Nationality: Egyptian
- Born: 5 June 1974 (age 51)
- Height: 1.96 m (6 ft 5 in)
- Weight: 95 kg (209 lb)

Sport
- Sport: Rowing

Kamal Hassan Muhammad Abdelrahim (born 5 June 1974) is an Egyptian rower. He competed in the 2000 Summer Olympics.
