= Gilles Bosquet =

French rower

Medal record

Men's rowing

Representing France

Olympic Games
Silver medal – second place	1996 Atlanta	Coxless four

World Rowing Championships
Gold medal – first place	2001 Lucerne	M4+
Silver medal – second place	1997 Aiguebelette	M4-
Silver medal – second place	1998 Cologne	M4-

Gilles Bosquet (born 14 July 1974 in Reims) is a French rower.
