= Filip Filipić =

Serbian rower (born 1980)

Personal information
- Nationality: Serbian
- Born: 25 April 1980 (age 44); Belgrade, Yugoslavia

Sport
- Sport: Rowing

Filip Filipić (born 25 April 1980) is a Serbian rower. He competed in the men's coxless four event at the 2000 Summer Olympics.
