= Lorenzo Porzio =

Italian rower

Medal record

Men's rowing

Representing Italy

Olympic Games
Bronze medal – third place	2004 Athens	Coxless fours

Lorenzo Porzio (born 24 August 1981, in Rome) is an Italian rower. He is also a world-renowned pianist and conductor.
