= Jan Herzog =

German rower

Medal record

Men's rowing

Representing Germany

World Rowing Championships
Bronze medal – third place	1997 Aiguebelette	LM4-

Jan Herzog (born 8 August 1974 in Berlin) is a German rower and spinal surgeon.
