= Thomas Herschmiller =

Canadian rower

Personal information
- Born: April 6, 1978 (age 48) Comox, British Columbia, Canada
Medal record
Men's rowing
Representing Canada
Olympic Games
Silver medal – second place	2004 Athens	Coxless four

Thomas Herschmiller (born April 6, 1978 in Comox, British Columbia) is a Canadian rower. He graduated from Brentwood College School in 1996. He won a gold medal at the 2003 world championships in Milan, Italy and a silver in the same event at the 2004 Summer Olympics.

== See also ==
- Princeton University Olympians
