= Joy Foster (archer) =

American archer (born 1979)

Joy Foster (née Fahrenkrog; born November 6, 1979) is an American archer. She was born in Castle Rock, Colorado and currently resides in Oxford, United Kingdom.

== Early life and education ==
Foster was born in Colorado in 1979. When she was 15, she was an exchange student to France with Rotary International. She completed high school at Phillips Exeter Academy in Exeter, New Hampshire. Upon graduating, she attended Skidmore College in Saratoga Springs, New York, spending one year at the London School of Economics in England.

After graduating from college, Foster took a job with Schwab Capital Markets and worked there until 2004 when she left to train full-time for the Olympics. Throughout the five years that she was training, she held a marketing job at Northwestern Mutual.

== Archery background ==
Foster is a four-time member of the United States Archery Team (2004–2008) and former Chula Vista Olympic Training Center Resident Athlete (2006–2007). She began archery in the winter of 2002 after graduating from Skidmore College in Saratoga Springs, New York, where she majored in Economics. In 2004, she tried out for her first Olympic team but just missed it, finishing 6th at the trials. In 2008, she tried for a second time and placed 7th in the first round of trials. After taking three months off due to a tear in her teres minor, she failed to advance to the third round of trials for the Beijing team, finishing 15th.

Despite not making either Olympic team, Joy did attend both the Athens and the Beijing games. In 2004, she went as a spectator and in 2008, she had a job as a journalist working for the Olympic News Service. In 2008, she was also part of two ad campaigns, one for Budweiser and one for Polo Ralph Lauren. Videos of each can be found on her website.

Foster has been a consistent top 8 finisher in national-level events and has competed internationally in Bulgaria, Mexico, the Netherlands, China and Korea. Highlights of her career include 2nd and 3rd-place finishes at the US Indoor Nationals in 2006 and 2007 as well as a 1st-place finish at the World Ranking Event in Puerto Rico in 2007.

== Personal information ==
Before picking up a bow, Foster was a rower. She competed at Exeter, in college and after college for a total of 7 years. Her most notable accomplishment was a gold medal finish at the Henley Women's Regatta in England in 2001. She has also run two marathons for charity, the Boston Marathon in 2002 for cancer research and the Rock 'n' Roll San Diego Marathon in 2008 for Team Darfur.

While in California, she volunteered at San Diego 211, Endow Chula Vista, Eastlake Church and the Purple Palace. Throughout her archery career, she has been actively involved with Junior Olympic Archery Development (JOAD) and has spent time working with kids with the North Dakota Shooting Sports Program and local clubs in Massachusetts and California.

As of 2026, Foster lives in Oxford, England. She previously lived in Luzern, Switzerland, where she married British Olympic rower Tim Foster on June 5, 2009. The pair were engaged at the 2008 Olympic Games in Beijing on August 18, 2008.

Foster founded and is the CEO of tech skills training company, TechPixies, in 2015.

== National and international tournaments ==
- World Ranking Event, Puerto Rico 2007 – 1st
- US Indoor Nationals 2006 – 2nd
- World Archery Festival 2004 – 3rd
- Texas Shootout 2005 – 3rd
- US Indoor Nationals 2007 – 3rd
- Texas Shootout 2007 – 3rd
- US Indoor Nationals 2004 – 5th
- Gold Cup 2004 – 5th
- Face 2 Face, Amsterdam 2004 – 5th
- US World Indoor Trials 2005 – 5th
- US Outdoor Nationals 2007 – 5th
- US Open 2007 – 5th
- US Olympic Trials 2004 – 6th
- US Open 2005 – 6th
- Texas Shootout 2006 – 6th
- US Outdoor Nationals 2006 – 6th
- US Outdoor Nationals 2004 – 7th
- 1st Leg of Olympic Trials 2008 – 7th
- Arizona Cup 2004 – 8th
- US Outdoor Nationals 2005 – 8th
- Gold Cup 2006 – 8th
- Arizona Cup 2005 – 9th
- US World Outdoor Trials 2007 – 9th
- US World Outdoor Trials 2005 – 10th
