= Paweł Jarosiński =

Polish rower

Personal information
- Nationality: Polish
- Born: 7 July 1975 (age 49); Warsaw, Poland

Sport
- Sport: Rowing

Paweł Jarosiński (born 7 July 1975) is a Polish rower. He competed in the men's coxless four event at the 2000 Summer Olympics.
