= Liang Hongming =

Chinese rower

Personal information
- Nationality: Chinese
- Born: 17 June 1973 (age 53)

Sport
- Sport: Rowing

Liang Hongming (born 17 June 1973) is a Chinese rower. He competed at the 1996 Summer Olympics and the 2000 Summer Olympics.
