= Stefan Forster =

German rower

Medal record

Men's rowing

Representing Germany

World Rowing Championships
Gold medal – first place	1995 Tampere	M8+
Silver medal – second place	1998 Cologne	M8+
Bronze medal – third place	1993 Račice	M4+

Stefan Forster (born 14 December 1971 in Würzburg) is a German rower.
