= Ziggy Rozalski =

American boxer

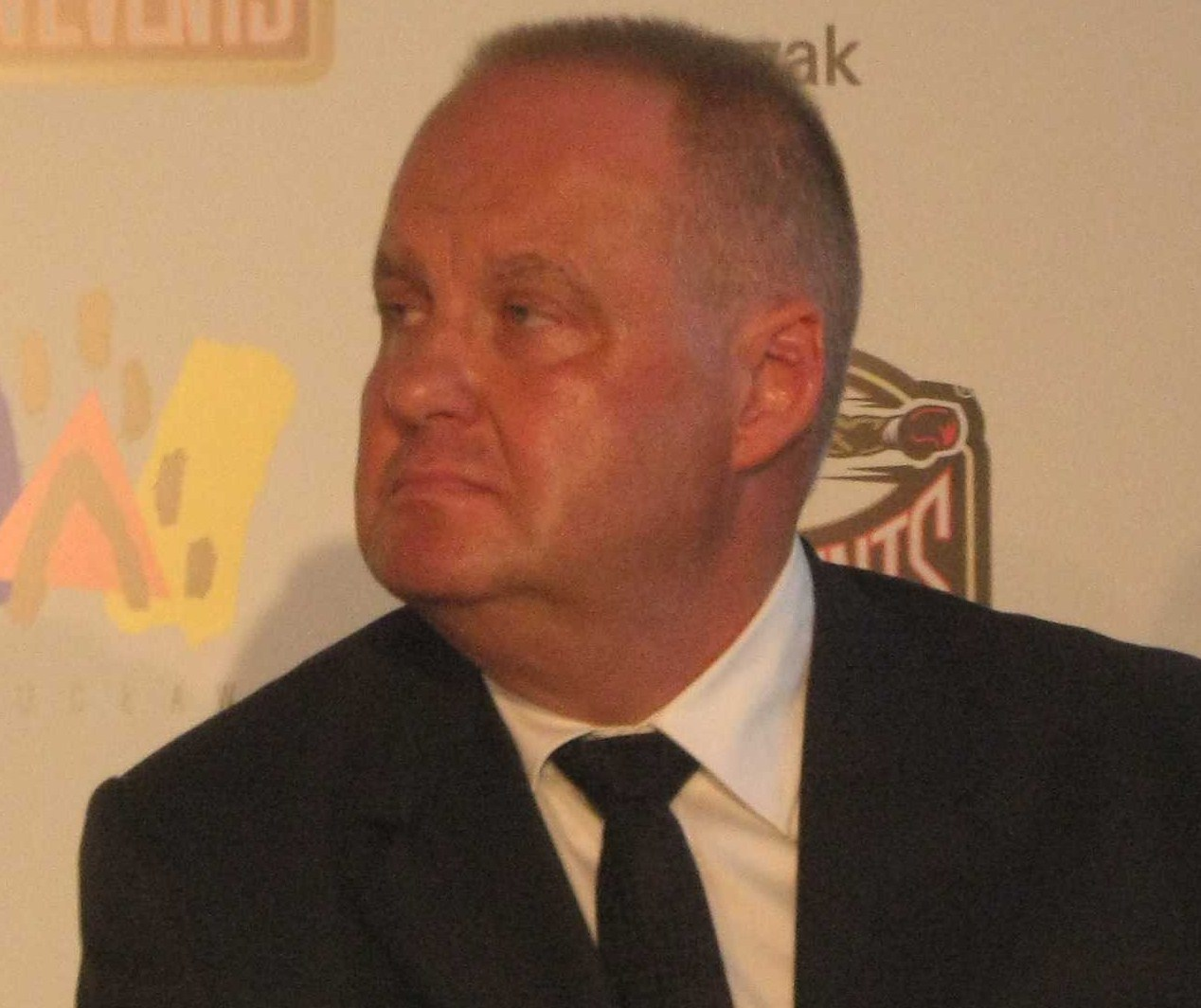
- Born: June 30, 1958 (age 68); Poland
- Occupations: Boxing promoter, manager

Ziggy Rozalski (born 1958) is a Polish American boxing manager and promoter. He represents Polish boxers Andrzej Gołota and Tomasz Adamek.

== Life ==
In 1973 he moved to the United States from Poland. He lives with his wife Diane and three children. He owns multiple businesses and has become Poland's most successful boxing promoter.
