= Carlo Mornati =

Italian rower

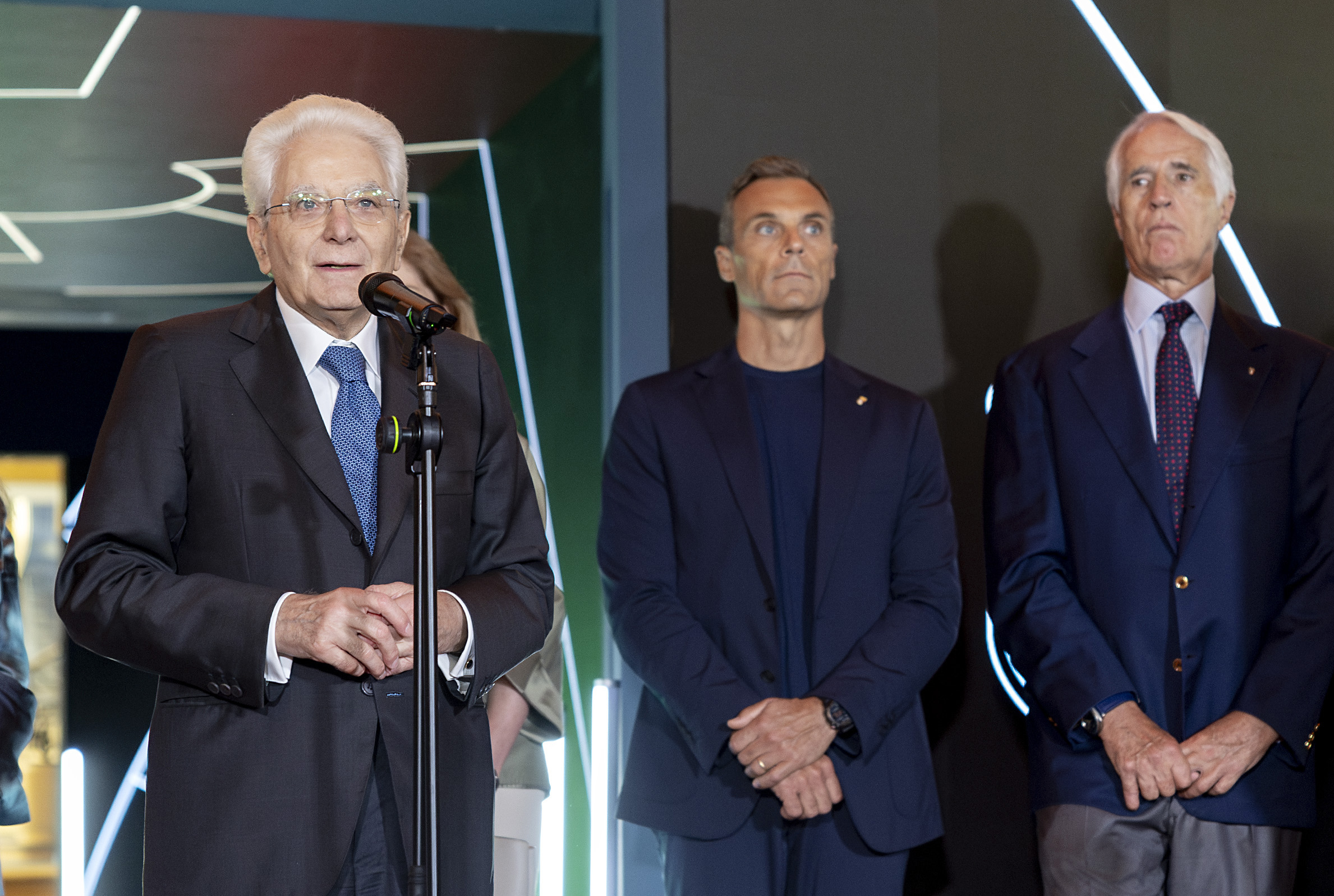
- Mornati (center) with Mattarella and Malagò at Paris 2024

Personal information
- National team: Italy
- Born: 16 March 1972 (age 54) Lecco, Italy
- Occupation: Sport manager
- Height: 1.87 m (6 ft 2 in)
- Weight: 86 kg (190 lb)

Sport
- Sport: Rowing
- Retired: 2008
Medal record
Men's rowing
Representing Italy
Olympic Games
Silver medal – second place	2000 Sydney	Coxless four
World Championships
Gold medal – first place	1994 Indianapolis	M4-
Gold medal – first place	1995 Tampere	M4-
Silver medal – second place	2005 Gifu	M8+
Silver medal – second place	2006 Eton	M8+
Silver medal – second place	2007 Munich	M4-
Bronze medal – third place	1998 Cologne	M4-
Bronze medal – third place	1999 St. Catharines	M4-
Bronze medal – third place	2002 Seville	M4-
Summer Universiade
Silver medal – second place	1993 Buffalo	Lwt M2-
Bronze medal – third place	1993 Buffalo	M4-

Carlo Leonardo Mornati (born 16 March 1972) is a former Italian rower.

== Career after competitive ==
In 2024 he is the head of mission of the Italian team at the Paris 2024 Olympic Games for CONI.
