= Ivan Smiljanić (rower) =

Personal information
- Born: 16 April 1981 (age 45) Belgrade, Yugoslavia
- Height: 196 cm (6 ft 5 in)
- Weight: 88 kg (194 lb)

Sport
- Sport: Rowing
- Club: California Golden Bears

Ivan Smiljanić (born 16 April 1981) is a rower who represented the combined team of Serbia and Montenegro at the 2000 Summer Olympics in Sydney.

== Career ==
Smiljanić was born in 1981 in Belgrade, Yugoslavia. He crewed for the California Golden Bears, Berkeley (USA) and served as their team captain before graduating with a degree in economics and political science. While at Cal he won two gold medals as well as a bronze at national championships on top of the two gold and silver medals he won at Pac-10s. Smiljanić also crewed in the 2000 Olympic Games as a member of the Serbian National Team in the coxless four. He won two gold, two silver and a bronze at World Rowing Junior Championships.

Smiljanić coached the Oakland Strokes, a high school rowing club, from 2006 to 2010.
