= Luca Agamennoni =

Italian rower (born 1980)

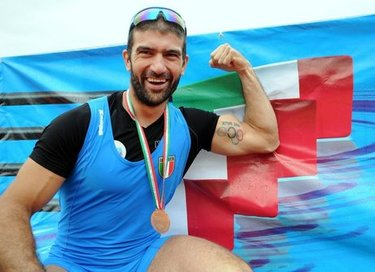
- Agamennoni in 2010

Personal information
- National team: Italy
- Born: 8 August 1980 (age 45) Livorno, Italy
- Height: 1.88 m (6 ft 2 in)
- Weight: 96 kg (212 lb)

Sport
- Sport: Rowing
- Club: Fiamme Gialle
- Start activity: 1997
- Coached by: Massimo Marconcini
- Retired: 2016
Medal record
Event	1st	2nd	3rd
Olympic Games	0	1	1
World Championships	0	3	1
European Championships	0	0	1
Mediterranean Games	1	0	0
Total	1	4	3

Luca Agamennoni (born 8 August 1980) is a former Italian rower who won silver medal and bronze medal in the 2008 Summer Olympics in Beijing and 2004 Summer Olympics in Athens.

== Biography ==
Luca Agamennoni has participated in four editions of the Summer Olympics (from Athens 2004 to Rio de Janeiro 2016), nine of the Rowing World Championships at senior level (from 2001 to 2015) and four of the European Rowing Championships (from 2007 to 2014) at senior level .

== Achievements ==
Rank	Competition	Event
Olympic Games
Bronze medal – third place	2004 Athens	Coxless Four
Silver medal – second place	2008 Beijing	Quadruple sculls
8th	2012 London	Quadruple sculls
7th	2016 Rio de Janeiro	Eight
World Championships
Silver medal – second place	2001 Lucerne	Coxed Four
Silver medal – second place	2006 Eton	Eight
Silver medal – second place	2010 Karapiro	Quadruple sculls
Bronze medal – third place	2005 Gifu	Coxless Pair
Mediterranean Games
Gold medal – first place	2005 Almería	Coxless Pairs
