= Cameron Baerg =

Canadian rower (born 1972)

Personal information
- Born: October 17, 1972 (age 53) Saskatoon, Saskatchewan, Canada
Medal record
Men's rowing
Representing Canada
Olympic Games
Silver medal – second place	2004 Athens	Men's coxless four
World Rowing Championships
Gold medal – first place	2003 Milan	Men's coxless four
World Rowing Cup
Gold medal – first place	2003 Lucerne	Men's coxless four
Gold medal – first place	2004 Munich	Men's coxless four
Silver medal – second place	2004 Lucerne	Men's coxless four
Henley Royal Regatta
Gold medal – first place	2003 Stewards's Challenge Cup	Men's coxless four

Cameron "Cam" Baerg (born October 17, 1972 in Saskatoon, Saskatchewan) is a Canadian rower.

== Rowing career ==
He began rowing in 1987. He won a gold medal at the men's four event at the 2003 World Championships in Milan, Italy and a silver at the same event at the 2004 Summer Olympics.
