= Boban Ranković =

Serbian rower

Personal information
- Nationality: Serbian
- Born: 4 February 1979 (age 47) Smederevo
- Home town: Smederevo, Serbia
- Height: 188 cm (6 ft 2 in)
- Weight: 85 kg (187 lb)

Sport
- Sport: Rowing
- •International Debut: 1995 World Junior Championships in Poznan, Poland 1996 – Silver in coxless pairs at the World Junior Championships in Glasgow 1997 – Silver in double sculls at the junior championship in Belgium •Olympic Games 2000 (Sydney): Competed in men’s coxless four alongside Mladen Stegić, Ivan Smiljanić, and Filip Filipić Qualifications: 5th place Repechage: Competed successfully to reach the semifinals Semifinals: 5th place Final B: Finished 8th overall •World Championships and World Cup: 2001 – Participated in World Cup stage in New Jersey and World Championships in Lucerne in coxless fours, finishing 4th in Final B

Boban Ranković (born 4 February 1979) is a Serbian rower. He competed in the men's coxless four event at the 2000 Summer Olympics.In 2015 and 2016, he won back to back coach of the year titles in rowing and a couple of NCAA titles. He now lives in Serbia with his wife Margaret and his 3 sons
