= Laurent Béghin =

French rower

Personal information
- Nationality: French
- Born: 21 February 1976 (age 50) Château-Gontier, France

Sport
- Sport: Rowing

Laurent Béghin (born 21 February 1976) is a well-known French rower.He won the world championship in 1999 in Men's coxless four. He competed in the men's coxless four event at the 2000 Summer Olympics. He detains multiple prestigious titles.
