= Mladen Stegić =

Serbian rower (born 1980)

Medal record

Men's rowing

Representing Serbia

World Rowing Junior Championships
Gold medal – first place	1998 Ottensheim	Coxless pairs

Mladen Stegić (Serbian: Младен Стегић, born 14 November 1980 in Belgrade, SR Serbia, Yugoslavia) is a Serbian rower.

He participated at the 2000 and 2004 Summer Olympics.

- 2000 Summer Olympics – Men's coxless four – 8th place
- 2004 Summer Olympics – Men's coxless pair – 5th place
