= Rafał Smoliński =

Polish rower

Personal information
- Nationality: Polish
- Born: 14 July 1977 (age 47); Toruń, Poland

Sport
- Sport: Rowing

Rafał Smoliński (born 14 July 1977) is a Polish rower. He competed at the 2000 Summer Olympics and the 2004 Summer Olympics.
