= Raffaello Leonardo =

Italian rower

Medal record

Men's rowing

Representing Italy

Olympic Games
| Bronze medal – third place | 2004 Athens | Coxless four |

World Rowing Championships
| Gold medal – first place | 1994 Indianapolis | M4- |
| Gold medal – first place | 1995 Tampere | M4- |
| Silver medal – second place | 2005 Gifu | M8+ |
| Bronze medal – third place | 2002 Seville | M4- |

Raffaello Leonardo (born 1 May 1973 in Naples) is an Italian rower.
