= Florin Corbeanu =

Romanian rower

Medal record

Men's rowing

Representing Romania

World Rowing Championships
Gold medal – first place	2001 Lucerne	M8+
Silver medal – second place	1997 Aiguebelette	M8+

Florin Corbeanu (born 17 March 1976 in Bucharest) is a Romanian rower.
