= Rok Kolander =

Slovenian rower

Personal information
- Born: 8 February 1980 (age 46)
Medal record
Men's Rowing
Representing Slovenia
World Rowing Championships
Bronze medal – third place	2001 Lucerne	Coxless four
Bronze medal – third place	2009 Poznań	Coxless four
Mediterranean Games
Bronze medal – third place	2005 Almería	Double Sculls

Rok Kolander (born 8 February 1980 in Maribor) is a Slovenian rower who represented Slovenia at the 2008 Summer Olympics in the Men's Coxless Four.
