= Wolfgang Moser =

American rower

Personal information
- Born: December 3, 1974 (age 51) Moultonborough, New Hampshire, U.S.
Medal record
Men's rowing
Representing United States
World Rowing Championships
Silver medal – second place	2003 Milan	M8+
Bronze medal – third place	2002 Seville	M8+

Wolfgang Moser (born December 3, 1974, in Moultonborough, New Hampshire) is an American rower. He graduated from Harvard University in 1998.
