= Michael Wherley =

American rower

Medal record

Men's rowing

Representing United States

World Rowing Championships
Gold medal – first place	1997 Aiguebelette	M8+
Gold medal – first place	1998 Cologne	M8+
Gold medal – first place	1999 St. Catharines	M8+
Silver medal – second place	2003 Milan	M8+
Bronze medal – third place	2002 Seville	M8+

Michael J. Wherley (born March 15, 1972, in Waconia, Minnesota) is a 3-time World Champion and 2-time Olympian in the sport of rowing. He started rowing at the University of Minnesota in 1990, before rowing at Penn AC Rowing Association and then the U.S. National Team from 1997 to 2004.

Wherley was part of the U.S. Men's Eight that won three straight World Championships in 1997–1999. He placed fifth in the Men's Four at the Sydney Olympics in 2000, which was won by Sir Steve Redgrave and the crew from Great Britain.

Wherley won two more medals in the U.S. Men's Eight, before ending his National Team career at the Athens Olympics in 2004 with a 10th-place finish in the Men's 4-.

In 2008, Wherley competed in The Boat Race for the University of Oxford; Oxford was victorious over Cambridge, and Wherley became the oldest rower in the history of the event at the time.

Wherley was inducted into the National Rowing Hall of Fame in 2014. He remains committed to the sport of rowing, and served as President of Penn AC Rowing Association. He lives in Philadelphia with his wife, Janet Distel, and their daughter.
