= Rob Hellstrom =

New Zealand rower

Personal information
- Birth name: Robert Douglas Hellstrom
- Nationality: New Zealand
- Born: 9 November 1977 (age 47); Palmerston North, New Zealand
- Height: 197 cm (6 ft 6 in)
- Weight: 96 kg (212 lb)

Robert Douglas Hellstrom (born 9 November 1977) is a New Zealand rower.

Hellstrom was born in 1977 in Palmerston North, New Zealand. He is a member of Horowhenua Rowing Club. He represented New Zealand at the 2000 Summer Olympics. He is listed as New Zealand Olympian athlete number 794 by the New Zealand Olympic Committee. He lives in Picton.
