= Artur Rozalski =

Polish rower

Personal information
- Nationality: Polish
- Born: 20 March 1978 (age 47) Toruń, Poland

Sport
- Sport: Rowing

Artur Rozalski (born 20 March 1978) is a Polish rower. He competed at the 2000 Summer Olympics and the 2004 Summer Olympics.
