= Steffen Størseth =

Norwegian rower (born 1975)

Medal record

Men's rowing

Olympic Games
Silver medal – second place	1996 Atlanta	Double sculls

World Rowing Championships
Silver medal – second place	1997 Aiguebelette-le-Lac	Double sculls
Silver medal – second place	1998 Cologne	Double sculls
Bronze medal – third place	1995 Tampere	Double sculls

Steffen Skår Størseth (born 26 April 1975) is a Norwegian competition rower and Olympic medalist.

He received a silver medal in double sculls at the 1996 Summer Olympics in Atlanta, together with Kjetil Undset.
