= Kjetil Undset =

Norwegian rower (born 1970)

Medal record

Representing Norway

Men's rowing

Olympic Games
Silver medal – second place	1992 Barcelona	Quadruple sculls
Silver medal – second place	1996 Atlanta	Double sculls

World Rowing Championships
Silver medal – second place	1997 Aiguebelette-le-Lac	Double sculls
Silver medal – second place	1998 Cologne	Double sculls
Bronze medal – third place	1995 Tampere	Double sculls

Kjetil Undset (born 24 August 1970) is a Norwegian competition rower and Olympic medalist.

He received a silver medal in quadruple sculls at the 1992 Summer Olympics in Barcelona.

He received a silver medal in double sculls at the 1996 Summer Olympics in Atlanta, together with Steffen Størseth.
