= Tim Foster =

English rower

Tim Foster MBE
Personal information
- Nationality: English
- Born: Timothy James Carrington Foster; 19 January 1970 (age 56) Bedford, Bedfordshire, England
- Education: Bedford Modern School
- Spouse: Joy Fahrenkrog

Sport
- Sport: Rowing
- University team: University of London Boat Club; Oxford University Boat Club
- Team: GB Rowing Team
- Coached by: Jürgen Gröbler
- Retired: July 2001
Medal record
Men's rowing
Representing Great Britain
Olympic Games
Gold medal – first place	2000 Sydney	Coxless four
Bronze medal – third place	1996 Atlanta	Coxless four
World Rowing Championships
Gold medal – first place	1997 Aiguebelette	Coxless four
Gold medal – first place	1998 Cologne	Coxless four
Silver medal – second place	1995 Tampere	Coxless four
Silver medal – second place	1999 St. Catharines	Eight
Bronze medal – third place	1989 Bled	Eight
Bronze medal – third place	1991 Vienna	Eight
Bronze medal – third place	1994 Indianapolis	Coxless four
- Updated on 5 March 2014

Timothy James Carrington Foster, MBE (born 19 January 1970) is an English rower who won a gold medal at the 2000 Summer Olympics in Sydney, Australia.

== Career ==
He began rowing at Bedford Modern School and competed in the World Rowing Junior Championships in 1987 and 1988. In the latter he competed in a pair with Matthew Pinsent. He became the first British rower to win gold medals at two consecutive Junior Worlds. From there he proceeded into the senior squad.

In 1993 he underwent back surgery but was straight back in the boat for the 1994 season, winning Bronze in the coxless four at the World Championships. This boat stayed together until the 1996 Olympics, where they won Bronze.

Following his Olympic medal, he continued his university studies at Oxford, competing in the 1997 Boat Race.

In 1997 he won a seat in the coxless four alongside Steve Redgrave, Matthew Pinsent and James Cracknell. In the run up to the Olympics, he again needed back surgery and time off after severing tendons in his hand by punching a window at a boat club party. In August 2000, the month prior to winning gold in Sydney, a three-part BBC documentary entitled Gold Fever was broadcast. This followed the coxless four team in the years leading up to the Olympics, including video diaries recording the highs and lows in the quest for gold. Despite the problems Foster had had, he was in the final crew and they won the gold medal at the Sydney 2000 Olympics. He was awarded an MBE for his part in this in 2001.

After Sydney, he retired from international rowing, and retired as an active rower in July 2001. After a stint coaching at the University of London Boat Club, he joined the UK Sport-sponsored Elite Coach Programme in 2004. In January 2007, he became the head coach of the Swiss national rowing squad. He remained in this role until 2012, and now works as a business coach.

== Personal life ==
At the 2008 Olympic Games in Beijing, Foster proposed to Joy Fahrenkrog, a four-time member of the United States Archery Team. The pair met in 2000 while Joy was studying at the London School of Economics and rowing for the University of London Boat Club. His brother Jason was the team manager for the England Rowing Team and head of rowing at George Watson's College, Edinburgh.

== Achievements ==
- Olympic Medals: 1 Gold, 1 Bronze
- World Championship Medals: 2 Gold, 2 Silver, 3 Bronze
- Junior World Championship Medals: 2 Gold
- Blue Boat Appearances: 1 (0 wins)

=== Olympic Games ===
- 2000: Gold, Coxless Four (with James Cracknell, Matthew Pinsent, Steve Redgrave)
- 1996: Bronze, Coxless Four
- 1992: 6th, Eight

=== World Championships ===
- 1999: Silver, Eight
- 1998: Gold, Coxless Four (with James Cracknell, Matthew Pinsent, Steve Redgrave)
- 1997: Gold, Coxless Four (with James Cracknell, Matthew Pinsent, Steve Redgrave)
- 1995: Silver, Coxless Four
- 1994: Bronze, Coxless Four
- 1993: Injured, did not compete in World Championships
- 1991: Bronze, Eight
- 1990: 4th, Coxless Four (with Martin Cross, Peter Mulkerrins, Gavin Stewart)
- 1989 – Bronze, Eight

=== Junior World Championships ===
- 1988: Gold, Coxless Pair (with Matthew Pinsent)
- 1987: Gold, Coxless Four

== Bibliography ==
- Four Men in a Boat (2004) ISBN 0-297-84725-2
