= Scott Brownlee =

New Zealand rower (born 1969)

Personal information
- Born: Scott Alexander Brownlee; 19 March 1969 (age 57) Christchurch, New Zealand
- Height: 197 cm (6 ft 6 in)
- Weight: 96 kg (212 lb)
- Relatives: Gerry Brownlee (cousin); Mark Brownlee (father)

Sport
- Country: New Zealand
- Sport: Rowing

Scott Alexander Brownlee (born 19 March 1969) is a New Zealand rower.

Brownlee was born in 1969 in Christchurch, New Zealand. His father is the rower Mark Brownlee and his cousin is the politician Gerry Brownlee.

He represented New Zealand at the 1992, 1996, and 2000 Summer Olympics in the coxless four. He is listed as New Zealand Olympian athlete number 600 by the New Zealand Olympic Committee. Brownlee is currently the CEO of Schick Civil Construction Ltd.
