= Matthew Pinsent =

English rower and broadcaster (born 1970)

Sir Matthew Pinsent CBE
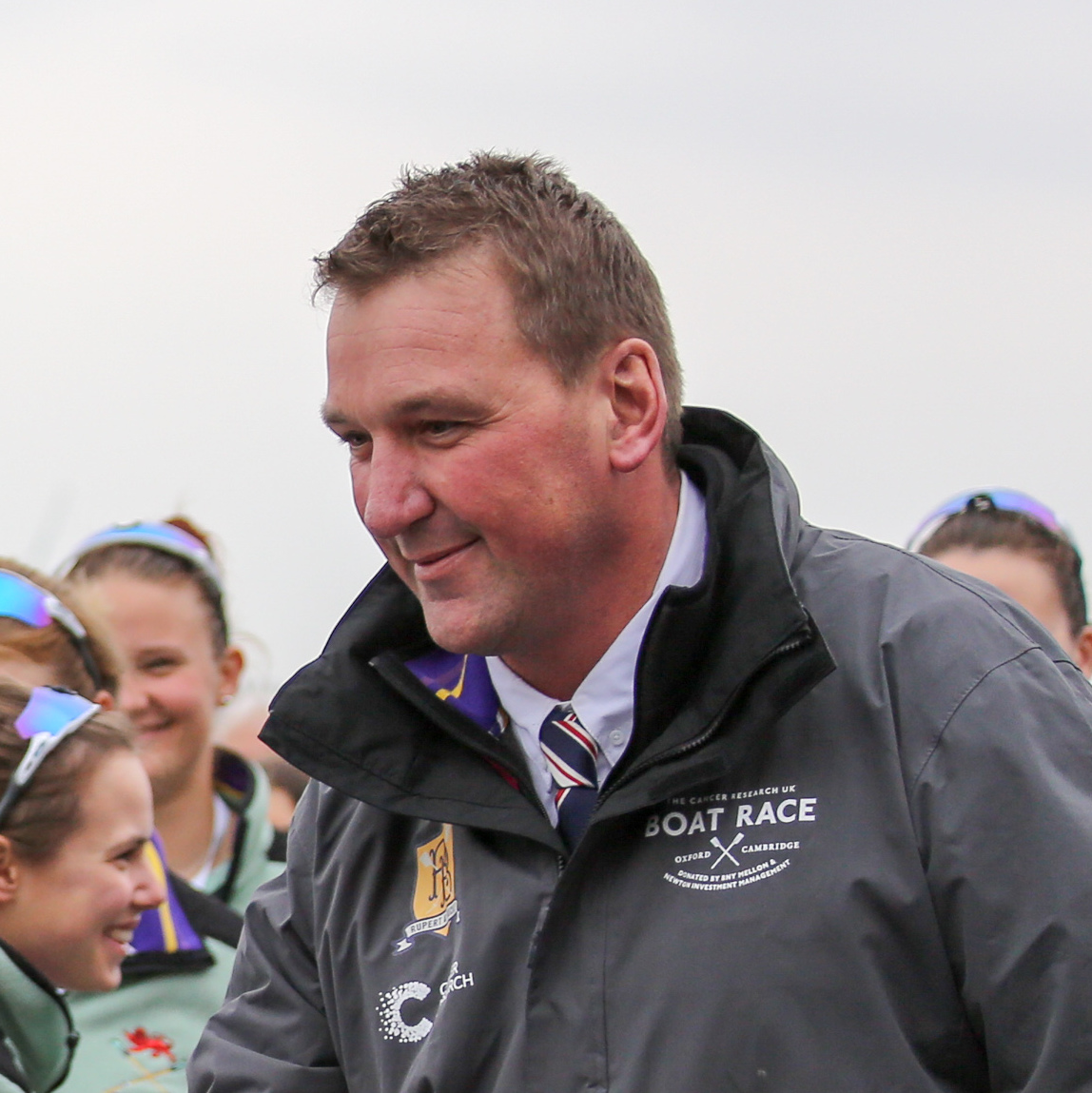
- Pinsent in 2018

Personal information
- Nationality: British
- Born: Matthew Clive Pinsent; 10 October 1970 (age 55) Holt, Norfolk, England
- Education: St Catherine's College, Oxford
- Height: 6 ft 5 in (196 cm)
- Weight: 238 lb (17.0 st; 108 kg)
- Website: www.matthewpinsent.com

Sport
- Country: Great Britain
- Sport: Men's rowing
- Events: Coxless pair, coxless four
- College team: Oxford University Boat Club
- Club: Leander Club
- Coached by: Jürgen Gröbler
- Retired: 2004
Medal record
Men's rowing
Representing Great Britain
Olympic Games
| Gold medal – first place | 1992 Barcelona | Coxless pair |
| Gold medal – first place | 1996 Atlanta | Coxless pair |
| Gold medal – first place | 2000 Sydney | Coxless four |
| Gold medal – first place | 2004 Athens | Coxless four |
World Championships
| Gold medal – first place | 1991 Vienna | Coxless pair |
| Gold medal – first place | 1993 Račice | Coxless pair |
| Gold medal – first place | 1994 Indianapolis | Coxless pair |
| Gold medal – first place | 1995 Tampere | Coxless pair |
| Gold medal – first place | 1997 Aiguebelette | Coxless four |
| Gold medal – first place | 1998 Cologne | Coxless four |
| Gold medal – first place | 1999 St. Catharines | Coxless four |
| Gold medal – first place | 2001 Lucerne | Coxless pair |
| Gold medal – first place | 2001 Lucerne | Coxed pair |
| Gold medal – first place | 2002 Seville | Coxless pair |
| Bronze medal – third place | 1989 Bled | Coxed four |
| Bronze medal – third place | 1990 Tasmania | Coxless pair |
The Boat Race
| Gold medal – first place | The Boat Race 1990 | Oxford |
| Gold medal – first place | The Boat Race 1991 | Oxford |
| Silver medal – second place | The Boat Race 1993 | Oxford |

Sir Matthew Clive Pinsent, CBE (/ˈpɪnsənt/; born 10 October 1970) is an English rower and broadcaster. During his rowing career, he won 10 world championship gold medals and four consecutive Olympic gold medals.

Since retiring, he has worked as a sports broadcaster for the BBC.

== Early life and family ==
Pinsent was born on 10 October 1970 in Holt, Norfolk. His father was the Rev. Ewen Macpherson Pinsent (1930–2020), curate of St Andrew's parish church, Kelso, Scottish Borders, and his mother, Jean Grizel, came from a distinguished military family.

Through his own aristocratic and military family, Pinsent is directly descended from King Edward I and William the Conqueror.

== Rowing ==
=== Student rower ===
Matthew Pinsent attended Aysgarth School in North Yorkshire before he began rowing at Eton College. He began his international career at the World Rowing Junior Championships in 1987. He raced again in 1988, winning the junior coxless pairs with Tim Foster.

After finishing school, Pinsent read geography at St Catherine's College, Oxford. While a student, he competed in three Boat Races, winning in 1990 and 1991 but was unsuccessful in 1993 (when he was Boat Club President), having taken a year out in 1992 in order to concentrate on preparing for the Barcelona Olympics.

=== International career ===
In 1990, while still at Oxford, he joined Steve Redgrave in the coxless pair at the World Rowing Championships, winning bronze. This was the beginning of a long partnership, and the pair won at the World Championships in 1991, and at the Olympic Games in 1992 and 1996.

In 2000 he won Olympic gold again as part of a coxless four with Redgrave, James Cracknell and Tim Foster. He also carried the flag for Team GB at the opening ceremony. In August 2000, the month prior to winning gold in Sydney, he took part in a three-part BBC documentary entitled Gold Fever. This followed the coxless four team in the years leading up to the Olympics, including video diaries recording the highs and lows in the quest for what would be Pinsent's third consecutive gold.

He was the subject of This Is Your Life in November 2000 when he was surprised by Michael Aspel during a party celebrating the achievements of the British Olympic Association at the London Aquarium.

Pinsent and Cracknell then formed a men's coxless pair and won the coxless and coxed pairs (with Neil Chugani coxing) in the 2001 World Championships, and the coxless pair in 2002. However, after a disappointing 2003 season that saw Pinsent's first World Championships defeat since 1990, he and Cracknell moved to the men's coxless four for 2004.

At the 2004 Summer Olympics in Athens, Pinsent's fourth Olympic Games, Pinsent stroked the boat, with Cracknell, Ed Coode and Steve Williams. In a close race with world champions Canada, they again won gold.

Pinsent was elected to the International Olympic Committee's Athletes' Commission in 2001, replacing Jan Železný. In 2004, at the Athens Olympics, Pinsent failed to secure re-election to the post, being replaced by Železný.

The 6 feet 5 inches (1.96 m), 17 stone (110 kg) Pinsent had at one time the largest lung capacity recorded for a sportsman at 8.5 litres. This has since been surpassed by fellow rower Pete Reed who has been measured at 11.68 litres.

=== Achievements ===
==== Olympic Games ====
- 2004 – Gold, Coxless Four (with James Cracknell, Steve Williams, Ed Coode)
- 2000 – Gold, Coxless Four (with James Cracknell, Tim Foster, Steve Redgrave)
- 1996 – Gold, Coxless Pair (with Steve Redgrave)
- 1992 – Gold, Coxless Pair (with Steve Redgrave)

==== World Championships ====
- 2003 – 4th, Coxless Pair (with James Cracknell)
- 2002 – Gold, Coxless Pair (with James Cracknell)
- 2001 – Gold, Coxless Pair (with James Cracknell)
- 2001 – Gold, Coxed Pair (with James Cracknell, Neil Chugani)
- 1999 – Gold, Coxless Four (with James Cracknell, Ed Coode, Steve Redgrave)
- 1998 – Gold, Coxless Four (with James Cracknell, Tim Foster, Steve Redgrave)
- 1997 – Gold, Coxless Four (with James Cracknell, Tim Foster, Steve Redgrave)
- 1995 – Gold, Coxless Pair (with Steve Redgrave)
- 1994 – Gold, Coxless Pair (with Steve Redgrave)
- 1993 – Gold, Coxless Pair (with Steve Redgrave)
- 1991 – Gold, Coxless Pair (with Steve Redgrave)
- 1990 – Bronze, Coxless Pair (with Steve Redgrave)
- 1989 – Bronze, Coxed Four (with Terry Dillon, Steve Turner, Gavin Stewart, Vaughan Thomas)

==== Junior World Championships ====
- 1988 – Gold, Coxless Pair (with Tim Foster)
- 1987 – 4th, Eight

== Career after rowing ==
Pinsent announced his retirement from rowing on 30 November 2004, and was made a Knight Bachelor in the New Year's Honours list announced on 31 December 2004.

He had already been appointed a Member of the Order of the British Empire in 1993, raised to Commander in 2001. He was awarded the Thomas Keller Medal by the International Rowing Federation in 2005.

Since retiring from rowing, Pinsent has worked for the BBC as a sports bulletin presenter and reporter. His assignments have included interviewing Dwain Chambers for Inside Sport, where Chambers confessed to taking drugs, and visiting gymnastics training centre in China where he found evidence of children being beaten, leading to IOC President Jacques Rogge to order an inquiry. He has also worked on a number of Olympic Games for the corporation. At Beijing 2008, Vancouver 2010, London 2012, Sochi 2014, Rio 2016 and Beijing 2022, Pinsent worked as a general reporter, compiling reports from sports and events across the games. At the Tokyo 2020 and Paris 2024 Olympics, Pinsent was also the water-side reporter for the rowing and canoeing events. Pinsent also reported from the Delhi 2010 and Glasgow 2014 Commonwealth Games.

Pinsent has maintained his ties to rowing as an umpire or commentator of key events on the rowing calendar such as the Olympics, Henley Royal Regatta and The Boat Races. He umpired his first "Blue Boat" race in 2013.

In June 2012, Pinsent rowed on the Gloriana as part of the royal pageant for the Diamond Jubilee of Elizabeth II. He appeared again on the Gloriana the following month, bearing the olympic torch as it crossed the river Thames.

Pinsent directed "Unbelievable – The Chad Le Clos Story", a documentary following Chad Le Clos and his family for 18 months in the run up to the 2016 Summer Olympics, which was first broadcast in July 2016.

In 2020 Pinsent appeared as a contestant on Series 15 of BBC Television's Celebrity Masterchef, finishing in joint-second place.

== Personal life ==
Pinsent is married to Demetra Koutsoukos, a businesswoman, former partner at McKinsey & Co, and former CEO of the makeup brand Charlotte Tilbury Ltd. The couple met at Oxford, where Koutsoukos was a Rhodes Scholar from Harvard.

They have three children: twin boys, Jonah and Lucas (born 2006) and a daughter, Eve (born 2008).

== Styles and honours ==
- Mr Matthew Pinsent (1970–1992)
- Mr Matthew Pinsent, MBE (1993–2000)
- Mr Matthew Pinsent, CBE (2001–2004)
- Sir Matthew Pinsent, CBE (2005—)

== Bibliography ==
- Pinsent, Matthew (2 September 2004). A Lifetime in a Race. Ebury Press. ISBN 978-0-09-190149-3.

Olympic Games
| Preceded by Steve Redgrave | Opening ceremony flagbearer for Great Britain; Sydney 2000 | Succeeded by Kate Howey |
