= Rowing at the 1996 Summer Olympics – Men's coxless pair =

Men's coxless pair at the Games of the XXVI Olympiad
- Venue: Lake Lanier, Georgia
- Date: 17–27 July 1996
- Competitors: 36 from 18 nations
- Winning time: 6:20.09

Medalists
1st place, gold medalist(s)		Steve Redgrave; Matthew Pinsent	Great Britain
2nd place, silver medalist(s)		David Weightman; Rob Scott	Australia
3rd place, bronze medalist(s)		Michel Andrieux; Jean-Christophe Rolland	France

The men's coxless pair competition at the 1996 Summer Olympics in Atlanta, Georgia took place at Lake Lanier, Georgia.

== Competition format ==
This rowing event was a sweep event, meaning that each rower has one oar and rows on only one side. Two rowers crewed each boat, with no coxswain. The competition consists of multiple rounds. Finals were held to determine the placing of each boat; these finals were given letters with those nearer to the beginning of the alphabet meaning a better ranking. Semifinals were named based on which finals they fed, with each semifinal having two possible finals.

With 18 boats in with heats, the best boats qualify directly for the semi-finals. All other boats progress to the repechage round, which offers a second chance to qualify for the semi-finals. The best three boats in each of the repechage qualify for the semi-finals. The final 2 boats from each repechage go forward to final C, which determines places 13–18. The best three boats in each of the two semi-finals qualify for final A, which determines places 1–6 (including the medals). Unsuccessful boats from semi-finals A/B go forward to final B, which determines places 7–12.

== Results ==
=== Heats ===
The first finisher of each heat advanced to the semifinals, remainder goes to the repechage.

==== Heat 1 ====
Rank	Rower	Country	Time	Notes
1	Michel Andrieux; Jean-Christophe Rolland	France	6:35.75	Q
2	Marco Penna; Walter Bottega	Italy	6:39.34	R
3	David Schaper; Toni Dunlop	New Zealand	6:42.15	R
4	Luc Goiris; Jaak vanDriessche	Belgium	6:43.83	R
5	Juozas Bagdonas; Einius Petkus	Lithuania	6:45.92	R
6	Andreas Nader; Hermann Bauer	Austria	6:46.18	R

==== Heat 2 ====
Rank	Rower	Country	Time	Notes
1	Steve Redgrave; Matthew Pinsent	Great Britain	6:50.04	Q
2	Marko Banovic; Ninoslav Saraga	Croatia	6:54.05	R
3	Carlos Palavecino; Walter Balunek	Argentina	6:56.03	R
4	Matthias Ungemach; Colin von Ettingshausen	Germany	6:57.78	R
5	George van Iwaarden; Kai Compagner	Netherlands	7:00.45	R
6	Gregory Bayne; John Callie	South Africa	7:01.05	R

==== Heat 3 ====
Rank	Rower	Country	Time	Notes
1	David Weightman; Rob Scott	Australia	6:46.12	Q
2	Michael Peterson; Adam Holland	United States	6:53.95	R
3	Orlin Ninov; Nikolay Kolev	Bulgaria	6:56.09	R
4	Dmitriy Plechistik; Dmitriy Mironchik	Belarus	6:57.57	R
5	Atilla Racz; Nicolae Spircu	Romania	6:57.77	R
6	Takeshi Kodama; Kazuhiko Kurata	Japan	7:06.56	R

=== Repechages ===
First three qualify for semifinals A/B, the rest to Final C.

==== Repechage 1 ====
Rank	Rower	Country	Time	Notes
1	Marco Penna; Walter Bottega	Italy	7:10.25	A/B
2	Juozas Bagdonas; Einius Petkus	Lithuania	7:10.47	A/B
3	Carlos Palavecino; Walter Balunek	Argentina	7:10.57	A/B
4	Gregory Bayne; John Callie	South Africa	7:11.14	C
5	Dmitriy Plechistik; Dmitriy Mironchik	Belarus	7:12.14	C

==== Repechage 2 ====
Rank	Rower	Country	Time	Notes
1	Marko Banovic; Ninoslav Saraga	Croatia	7:05.81	A/B
2	Luc Goiris; Jaak vanDriessche	Belgium	7:06.76	A/B
3	Orlin Ninov; Nikolay Kolev	Bulgaria	7:13.48	A/B
4	George van Iwaarden; Kai Compagner	Netherlands	7:24.17	C
5	Takeshi Kodama; Kazuhiko Kurata	Japan	7:36.68	C

==== Repechage 3 ====
Rank	Rower	Country	Time	Notes
1	Michael Peterson; Jonathan Holland	United States	7:02.13	A/B
2	Andreas Nader; Hermann Bauer	Austria	7:03.86	A/B
3	David Schaper; Toni Dunlop	New Zealand	7:04.40	A/B
4	Atilla Racz; Nicolae Spircu	Romania	7:07.96	C
5	Matthias Ungemach; Colin von Ettingshausen	Germany	7:11.67	C

=== Semifinals ===
First three qualify to Final A, remainder to Final B.

==== Semifinal 1 ====
Rank	Rower	Country	Time	Notes
1	David Weightman; Rob Scott	Australia	6:46.43	A
2	Michel Andrieux; Jean-Christophe Rolland	France	6:49.15	A
3	Marko Banovic; Ninoslav Saraga	Croatia	6:55.89	A
4	Andreas Nader; Hermann Bauer	Austria	6:57.44	B
5	Juozas Bagdonas; Einius Petkus	Lithuania	6:57.75	B
6	Orlin Ninov; Nikolay Kolev	Bulgaria	7:00.12	B

==== Semifinal 2 ====
Rank	Rower	Country	Time	Notes
1	Steve Redgrave; Matthew Pinsent	Great Britain	6:50.30	A
2	David Schaper; Toni Dunlop	New Zealand	6:51.64	A
3	Marco Penna; Walter Bottega	Italy	6:52.32	A
4	Michael Peterson; Jonathan Holland	United States	6:52.92	B
5	Luc Goiris; Jaak vanDriessche	Belgium	6:55.84	B
6	Carlos Palavecino; Walter Balunek	Argentina	7:15.59	B

=== Finals ===
==== Final C ====
Rank	Rower	Country	Time	Notes
13	Atilla Racz; Nicolae Spircu	Romania	7:01.94	
14	Dmitriy Plechistik; Dmitriy Mironchik	Belarus	7:03.31	
15	Matthias Ungemach; Colin von Ettingshausen	Germany	7:06.88	
16	Gregory Bayne; John Callie	South Africa	7:09.91	
17	George van Iwaarden; Kai Compagner	Netherlands	7:10.43	
18	Takeshi Kodama; Kazuhiko Kurata	Japan	7:21.31	

==== Final B ====
Rank	Rower	Country	Time	Notes
7	Michael Peterson; Jonathan Holland	United States	6:33.81	
8	Luc Goiris; Jaak vanDriessche	Belgium	6:34.46	
9	Orlin Ninov; Nikolay Kolev	Bulgaria	6:35.71	
10	Juozas Bagdonas; Einius Petkus	Lithuania	6:38.12	
11	Andreas Nader; Hermann Bauer	Austria	6:38.60	
12	Carlos Palavecino; Walter Balunek	Argentina	6:49.34	

==== Final A ====
Rank	Rower	Country	Time	Notes
1st place, gold medalist(s)	Steve Redgrave; Matthew Pinsent	Great Britain	6:20.09	
2nd place, silver medalist(s)	David Weightman; Rob Scott	Australia	6:21.02	
3rd place, bronze medalist(s)	Michel Andrieux; Jean-Christophe Rolland	France	6:22.15	
4	Marco Penna; Walter Bottega	Italy	6:28.61	
5	David Schaper; Toni Dunlop	New Zealand	6:29.24	
6	Marko Banovic; Ninoslav Saraga	Croatia	6:30.48	

== Sources ==
- The Official Report of the Centennial Olympic Games Volume Three ˗ The Competition Results (PDF) (PDF). p. 331. Archived from the original (PDF) on 27 September 2007.
