= Rowing at the 1992 Summer Olympics – Men's coxless pair =

Men's coxless pair at the Games of the XXV Olympiad
- Date: 27 July – 1 August 1992
- Competitors: 38 from 19 nations

Medalists
1st place, gold medalist(s)		Matthew Pinsent; Steve Redgrave	Great Britain
2nd place, silver medalist(s)		Colin von Ettingshausen; Peter Hoeltzenbein	Germany
3rd place, bronze medalist(s)		Iztok Čop; Denis Žvegelj	Slovenia

The men's coxless pair competition at the 1992 Summer Olympics took place at took place at Lake of Banyoles, Spain.

== Competition format ==
The competition consisted of three main rounds (heats, semifinals, and finals) as well as a repechage. The 19 boats were divided into four heats for the first round, with 4 or 5 boats in each heat. The winner of each heat (4 boats total) advanced directly to the semifinals. The remaining 15 boats were placed in the repechage. The repechage featured four heats, with 3 or 4 boats in each heat. The top two boats in each repechage heat (8 boats total) advanced to the main semifinals. The slowest boat overall in the repechage finished in 19th place. The remaining 6 boats were placed in the "C" final to compete for 13th through 18th places.

The 12 semifinalist boats were divided into two heats of 6 boats each. The top three boats in each semifinal (6 boats total) advanced to the "A" final to compete for medals and 4th through 6th place; the bottom three boats in each semifinal were sent to the "B" final for 7th through 12th.

All races were over a 2000 metre course.

== Results ==
=== Heats ===
==== Heat 1 ====
Rank	Rowers	Nation	Time	Notes
1	Colin von Ettingshausen; Peter Hoeltzenbein	Germany	6:41.65	Q
2	Snorre Lorgen; Sverke Lorgen	Norway	6:43.10	R
3	Dragoş Neagu; Vasile Tomoiagă	Romania	6:47.43	R
4	Matthew McArdle; Nick McDonald-Crowley	Australia	6:48.18	R
5	Vladimir Banjanac; Lazo Pivač	Independent Olympic Athletes	7:08.35	R

==== Heat 2 ====
Rank	Rowers	Nation	Time	Notes
1	Luc Goiris; Jaak Van Driessche	Belgium	6:38.49	Q
2	Michel Andrieux; Jean-Christophe Rolland	France	6:39.95	R
3	Harold Backer; Henry Hering	Canada	6:42.84	R
4	Ričardas Bukys; Zigmas Gudauskas	Lithuania	6:59.38	R
5	Mitsuru Kimura; Kazuaki Mimoto	Japan	7:25.20	R

==== Heat 3 ====
Rank	Rowers	Nation	Time	Notes
1	Matthew Pinsent; Steve Redgrave	Great Britain	6:36.53	Q
2	Iztok Čop; Denis Žvegelj	Slovenia	6:37.11	R
3	Christoph Küffer; Thomas Studhalter	Switzerland	6:44.82	R
4	John Pescatore; Peter Sharis	United States	6:52.43	R
5	Imre Magyar; Henrik Schneider	Hungary	6:53.82	R

==== Heat 4 ====
Rank	Rowers	Nation	Time	Notes
1	Zlatko Bužina; Marko Perinović	Croatia	6:41.37	Q
2	Sjors van Iwaarden; Kai Compagner	Netherlands	6:42.91	R
3	Nikolay Pimenov; Yury Pimenov	Unified Team	7:09.37	R
4	Hermann Bauer; Karl Sinzinger Jr.	Austria	7:44.81	R

=== Repechage ===
==== Repechage 1 ====
Rank	Rowers	Nation	Time	Notes
1	Sjors van Iwaarden; Kai Compagner	Netherlands	6:46.43	Q
2	Christoph Küffer; Thomas Studhalter	Switzerland	6:47.61	Q
3	Vladimir Banjanac; Lazo Pivač	Independent Olympic Athletes	6:54.76	QC
4	Ričardas Bukys; Zigmas Gudauskas	Lithuania	7:01.82	QC

==== Repechage 2 ====
Rank	Rowers	Nation	Time	Notes
1	Iztok Čop; Denis Žvegelj	Slovenia	6:46.71	Q
2	Harold Backer; Henry Hering	Canada	6:47.46	Q
3	Matthew McArdle; Nick McDonald-Crowley	Australia	6:48.67	QC

==== Repechage 3 ====
Rank	Rowers	Nation	Time	Notes
1	Michel Andrieux; Jean-Christophe Rolland	France	6:43.83	Q
2	Hermann Bauer; Karl Sinzinger Jr.	Austria	6:52.89	Q
3	Imre Magyar; Henrik Schneider	Hungary	6:53.44	QC
4	Dragoş Neagu; Vasile Tomoiagă	Romania	7:28.57	

==== Repechage 4 ====
Rank	Rowers	Nation	Time	Notes
1	Snorre Lorgen; Sverke Lorgen	Norway	6:42.97	Q
2	John Pescatore; Peter Sharis	United States	6:45.31	Q
3	Nikolay Pimenov; Yury Pimenov	Unified Team	6:51.57	QC
4	Mitsuru Kimura; Kazuaki Mimoto	Japan	7:26.14	QC

=== Semifinals ===
==== Semifinal 1 ====
Rank	Rowers	Nation	Time	Notes
1	Matthew Pinsent; Steve Redgrave	Great Britain	6:31.13	QA
2	Colin von Ettingshausen; Peter Hoeltzenbein	Germany	6:33.72	QA
3	Iztok Čop; Denis Žvegelj	Slovenia	6:34.48	QA
4	Snorre Lorgen; Sverke Lorgen	Norway	6:38.28	QB
5	Hermann Bauer; Karl Sinzinger Jr.	Austria	6:45.42	QB
6	Christoph Küffer; Thomas Studhalter	Switzerland	6:47.03	QB

==== Semifinal 2 ====
Rank	Rowers	Nation	Time	Notes
1	Michel Andrieux; Jean-Christophe Rolland	France	6:33.88	QA
2	Luc Goiris; Jaak Van Driessche	Belgium	6:34.72	QA
3	John Pescatore; Peter Sharis	United States	6:35.99	QA
4	Harold Backer; Henry Hering	Canada	6:37.29	QB
5	Sjors van Iwaarden; Kai Compagner	Netherlands	6:39.85	QB
6	Zlatko Bužina; Marko Perinović	Croatia	6:47.87	QB

=== Finals ===
==== Final C ====
Rank	Rowers	Nation	Time
13	Matthew McArdle; Nick McDonald-Crowley	Australia	6:44.06
14	Vladimir Banjanac; Lazo Pivač	Independent Olympic Athletes	6:44.52
15	Nikolay Pimenov; Yury Pimenov	Unified Team	6:48.24
16	Imre Magyar; Henrik Schneider	Hungary	6:51.20
17	Ričardas Bukys; Zigmas Gudauskas	Lithuania	7:03.01
18	Mitsuru Kimura; Kazuaki Mimoto	Japan	7:17.93

==== Final B ====
Rank	Rowers	Nation	Time
7	Snorre Lorgen; Sverke Lorgen	Norway	6:36.16
8	Sjors van Iwaarden; Kai Compagner	Netherlands	6:37.22
9	Harold Backer; Henry Hering	Canada	6:37.32
10	Zlatko Bužina; Marko Perinović	Croatia	6:37.57
11	Christoph Küffer; Thomas Studhalter	Switzerland	6:39.64
12	Hermann Bauer; Karl Sinzinger Jr.	Austria	6:46.68

==== Final A ====
Rank	Rowers	Nation	Time
1st place, gold medalist(s)	Matthew Pinsent; Steve Redgrave	Great Britain	6:27.72
2nd place, silver medalist(s)	Colin von Ettingshausen; Peter Hoeltzenbein	Germany	6:32.68
3rd place, bronze medalist(s)	Iztok Čop; Denis Žvegelj	Slovenia	6:33.43
4	Michel Andrieux; Jean-Christophe Rolland	France	6:36.34
5	Luc Goiris; Jaak Van Driessche	Belgium	6:38.20
6	John Pescatore; Peter Sharis	United States	6:39.23

== Final classification ==
The following rowers took part:

Rank	Rowers	Country
1st place, gold medalist(s)	Matthew Pinsent; Steve Redgrave	Great Britain
2nd place, silver medalist(s)	Colin von Ettingshausen; Peter Hoeltzenbein	Germany
3rd place, bronze medalist(s)	Iztok Čop; Denis Žvegelj	Slovenia
	Michel Andrieux; Jean-Christophe Rolland	France
	Jaak Van Driessche; Luc Goiris	Belgium
	Peter Sharis; John Pescatore	United States
	Snorre Lorgen; Sverke Lorgen	Norway
	Sjors van Iwaarden; Kai Compagner	Netherlands
	Henry Hering; Harold Backer	Canada
	Zlatko Bužina; Marko Perinović	Croatia
	Christoph Küffer; Thomas Studhalter	Switzerland
	Karl Sinzinger Jr. Hermann Bauer	Austria
	Nick McDonald-Crowley; Matthew McArdle	Australia
	Vladimir Banjanac; Lazo Pivač	Independent Olympic Athletes
	Yury Pimenov; Nikolay Pimenov	Unified Team
	Henrik Schneider; Imre Magyar	Hungary
	Ričardas Bukys; Zigmas Gudauskas	Lithuania
	Mitsuru Kimura; Kazuaki Mimoto	Japan
	Vasile Tomoiagă; Dragoş Neagu	Romania
