= Lithuania at the 1992 Summer Olympics =

- IOC code: LTU
- NOC: Lithuanian National Olympic Committee

in Barcelona
- Competitors: 47 (36 men and 11 women) in 11 sports
- Flag bearer: Raimundas Mažuolis
- Medals Ranked 34th: Gold 1 Silver 0 Bronze 1 Total 2

Summer Olympics appearances (overview)
- 1924; 1928; 1932–1988; 1992; 1996; 2000; 2004; 2008; 2012; 2016; 2020; 2024

Other related appearances
- Russian Empire (1908–1912); Soviet Union (1952–1988)

Lithuania competed at the 1992 Summer Olympics in Barcelona, Spain. It was the first Olympiad after the breakup of the Soviet Union. Lithuania was one of three ex-Soviet republics to compete individually, with Estonia and Latvia being the other two, instead of competing on the Unified Team. 47 competitors, 36 men and 11 women, took part in 31 events in 11 sports.

== Medalists ==
Medal	Name	Sport	Event	Date
Gold	Romas Ubartas	Athletics	Men's discus throw	5 August
Bronze	Lithuania men's national basketball team: Romanas Brazdauskis; Valdemaras Chomičius Darius Dimavičius; Gintaras Einikis; Sergejus Jovaiša; Artūras Karnišovas; Gintaras Krapikas; Rimas Kurtinaitis; Šarūnas Marčiulionis; Alvydas Pazdrazdis; Arvydas Sabonis; Arūnas Visockas	Basketball	Men's tournament	8 August

== Competitors ==
The following is the list of number of competitors in the Games.

Sport	Men	Women	Total
Athletics	4	4	8
Basketball	12	0	12
Boxing	4	–	4
Canoeing	1	0	1
Cycling	1	4	5
Judo	1	0	1
Modern pentathlon	3	–	3
Rowing	5	3	8
Sailing	2	0	2
Swimming	2	0	2
Wrestling	1	–	1
Total	36	11	47

== Athletics ==
Men
Track & road events

Athlete	Event	Heat		Quarterfinal		Semifinal		Final	
Athlete	Event	Result	Rank	Result	Rank	Result	Rank	Result	Rank
Viktoras Meškauskas	20 km walk	—N/a						1:33:24	26

Field events

Athlete	Event	Qualification		Final	
Athlete	Event	Distance	Position	Distance	Position
Romas Ubartas	Discus throw	66.08	1 Q	65.12	Gold medal
Vaclavas Kidykas	Discus throw	59.96 m	15	did not advance	
Benjaminas Viluckis	Hammer throw	70.54	20	did not advance	

Women
Field events

Athlete	Event	Qualification		Final	
Athlete	Event	Distance	Position	Distance	Position
Nelė Savickytė	High jump	1.90	20	did not advance	
Nijolė Medvedeva	Long jump	DSQ		did not advance	
Teresė Nekrošaitė	Javelin throw	58.28	18	did not advance	

Combined events – Heptathlon

Athlete	Event	100H	HJ	SP	200 m	LJ	JT	800 m	Final	Rank
Remigija Nazarovienė	Result	13.75	1.76	14.49	25.20	6.03	44.42	2:14.95	6142	14
Remigija Nazarovienė	Points	1.014	928	827	869	859	752	893	6142	14

== Basketball ==
=== Men's team competition ===
==== Group B ====
Qualified for the quarterfinals

Team	W	L	PF	PA	PD	Pts	Tie
CIS	4	1	425	373	+52	9	1–0
Lithuania	4	1	481	424	+57	9	0–1
Australia	3	2	432	396	+36	8	1–0
Puerto Rico	3	2	445	440	+15	8	0–1
Venezuela	1	4	392	427	−35	6	
China	0	5	381	496	−115	5	

July 26
11:30

China	75–112	Lithuania
Scoring by half: 26–55, 49–57

Palau Municipal d'Esports de Badalona, Barcelona

July 27
11:30

Venezuela	79–87	Lithuania
Scoring by half: 46–38, 33–49

Palau Municipal d'Esports de Badalona, Barcelona

July 29
16:30

Lithuania	104–91	Puerto Rico
Scoring by half: 50–43, 54–48

Palau Municipal d'Esports de Badalona, Barcelona

July 31
16:30

Lithuania	80–92	CIS
Scoring by half: 38–26, 42–66

Palau Municipal d'Esports de Badalona, Barcelona

August 2
16:30

Australia	87–98	Lithuania
Scoring by half: 46–45, 41–53

Palau Municipal d'Esports de Badalona, Barcelona

==== Quarterfinals ====
August 4
20:30

Lithuania	114–96	Brazil
Scoring by half: 48–52, 66–44

Palau Municipal d'Esports de Badalona, Barcelona

==== Semifinals ====
August 6
22:30

Lithuania	76–127	United States
Scoring by half: 30–49, 46–78

Palau Municipal d'Esports de Badalona, Barcelona

==== Bronze medal game ====
August 8
13:00

CIS	78–82	Lithuania
Scoring by half: 33–39, 45–43

Palau Municipal d'Esports de Badalona, Barcelona

==== Team roster ====
- Romanas Brazdauskis
- Valdemaras Chomičius
- Darius Dimavičius
- Gintaras Einikis
- Sergejus Jovaiša
- Artūras Karnišovas
- Gintaras Krapikas
- Rimas Kurtinaitis
- Šarūnas Marčiulionis
- Alvydas Pazdrazdis
- Arvydas Sabonis
- Arūnas Visockas

== Boxing ==
Men

Athlete	Event	1 Round	2 Round	Quarterfinals	Semifinals	Final	
Athlete	Event	Opposition Result	Opposition Result	Opposition Result	Opposition Result	Opposition Result	Rank
Vitalijus Karpačiauskas	Welterweight	Andrey Piestrayev (EUN); W 9-4	Pepe Reilly (USA); W 16-5	Arkhom Chenglai (THA); L 6-9	Did not advance		5
Leonidas Maleckis	Light Middleweight	Kabary Salem (EGY); W 13-6	Robin Reid (GBR); L 3-10	Did not advance			9
Vidas Markevičius	Heavyweight	Alexey Chudinov (EUN); L 3-7	Did not advance				17
Gytis Juškevičius	Super Heavyweight	BYE	David Anyim (KEN); W RSC-2	Richard Igbineghu (NGR); L KO-2	Did not advance		5

== Canoeing ==
Men

Athlete	Event	Heats		Repechages		Semifinals		Final	
Athlete	Event	Time	Rank	Time	Rank	Time	Rank	Time	Rank
Artūras Vieta	K-1 500 m	1:41.96	3 Q	1:41.04	2 Q	1:42.09	3 Q	1:42.34	9
Artūras Vieta	K-1 1000 m	3:40.81	2 Q	BYE		3:37.54	4 Q	3:46.92	9

== Cycling ==
Five cyclists, one man and four women, represented Lithuania in 1992.

=== Road ===
Athlete	Event	Time	Rank
Saulius Šarkauskas	Men's road race	4:35:56	23
Daiva Čepelienė	Women's road race	2:05:03	20
Aiga Zagorska	Women's road race	2:05:03	14
Laima Zilporytė	Women's road race	2:05:03	18

=== Track ===
Sprint

Athlete	Event	Qualification		Round 1	Repechage 1	Quarterfinals	Classification 5-8	Semifinals	Final	
Athlete	Event	Time Speed (km/h)	Rank	Opposition Time Speed (km/h)	Opposition Time Speed (km/h)	Opposition Time Speed (km/h)	Opposition Time Speed (km/h)	Opposition Time Speed (km/h)	Opposition Time Speed (km/h)	Rank
Rita Razmaitė	Women's sprint	12.058	8 Q	Haringa (NED); Yan (CHN); L	Yenyukhina (EUN); L	did not advance				

Pursuit

Athlete	Event	Qualification		Quarterfinals	Semifinals	Final	
Athlete	Event	Time	Rank	Opposition Time	Opposition Time	Opposition Time	Rank
Aiga Zagorska	Women's individual pursuit	3:52.450	13	did not advance			13

== Judo ==
Men

Athlete	Event	Preliminary	Round of 32	Round of 16	Quarterfinals	Semifinals	Repechage 1	Repechage 2	Repechage 3	Repechage Final	Final / BM	
Athlete	Event	Opposition Result	Opposition Result	Opposition Result	Opposition Result	Opposition Result	Opposition Result	Opposition Result	Opposition Result	Opposition Result	Opposition Result	Rank
Vladas Burba	−95 kg	BYE	Theodorus Meijer (NED); L 0001–0000	did not advance			BYE	Yasuhiro Kai (JPN); L 0001–0000	did not advance			

== Modern pentathlon ==
Three male pentathletes represented Lithuania in 1992.

Athlete	Event	Shooting (10 m air pistol)	Fencing (épée one touch)	Swimming (200 m freestyle)	Riding (show jumping)	Running (3000 m)	Total points	Final rank
Athlete	Event	Points	Points	Points	Points	Points	Total points	Final rank
Vladimiras Močialovas	Men's	880	660	1204	830	1231	4805	51
Tomas Narkus	Men's	1210	694	1224	DNF	1153	4281	62
Gintaras Staškevičius	Men's	1060	745	1352	840	1237	5234	15
Gintaras Staškevičius; Vladimiras Močialovas; Tomas Narkus	Team	3150	2099	3780	1670	3621	14320	15

== Rowing ==
Men

Athlete	Event	Heats		Repechage		Semifinals C-D		Semifinals		Final	
Athlete	Event	Time	Rank	Time	Rank	Time	Rank	Time	Rank	Time	Rank
Ričardas Bukys; Zigmantas Gudauskas	Coxless pair	6:59.38	4 R	7:01.82	4 FC	—N/a				7:03.01	17
Juozas Bagdonas; Einius Petkus; Valdemaras Mačiulskis	Coxed pair	7:04.41	2 Q	BYE		—N/a		7:03.89	4 FB	7:04.98	9

Women

Athlete	Event	Heats		Repechage		Semifinals C-D		Semifinals		Final	
Athlete	Event	Time	Rank	Time	Rank	Time	Rank	Time	Rank	Time	Rank
Kristina Poplavskaja	Single sculls	8:06.31	4 R	8:01.31	3 Q	—N/a		8:05.15	6 FB	8:27.84	11
Violeta Lastakauskaitė; Violeta Bernotaitė	Coxless pair	8:04.77	4 R	7:52.47	1 Q	—N/a		7:30.54	4 FB	7:29.24	10

== Sailing ==
Men

Athlete	Event	Race										Net points	Final rank
Athlete	Event	1	2	3	4	5	6	7	8	9	10	Net points	Final rank
Raimondas Šiugždinis; Valdas Balciunas	470	20	26	27	30	~~34~~	15	22	—N/a			176.0	32

== Swimming ==
Men

Athlete	Event	Heat		Final B		Final	
Athlete	Event	Time	Rank	Time	Rank	Time	Rank
Nerijus Beiga	100 m breaststroke	1:05.17	36	did not advance			
Nerijus Beiga	200 m breaststroke	1:21.65	31	did not advance			
Raimundas Mažuolis	50 m freestyle	22.77	9 q	22.71	10	did not advance	
Raimundas Mažuolis	100 m freestyle	50.17	9 q	50.13	10	did not advance	

== Wrestling ==
Men's Greco-Roman

Athlete	Event	Elimination Pool							Final round	
Athlete	Event	Round 1 Result	Round 2 Result	Round 3 Result	Round 4 Result	Round 5 Result	Round 6 Result	Rank	Final round Result	Rank
Remigijus Šukevičius	−57 kg	Nikolay Dimitrov (BUL); L 2-4	Dennis Hall (USA); L 3-4	—N/a				8	did not advance	
