= Rowing at the 1988 Summer Olympics – Men's coxless pair =

Men's coxless pair at the Games of the XXIV Olympiad
- Date: 19–24 September 1988
- Competitors: 37 from 18 nations

Medalists
1st place, gold medalist(s)		Andy Holmes; Steve Redgrave	Great Britain
2nd place, silver medalist(s)		Dănuț Dobre; Dragoș Neagu	Romania
3rd place, bronze medalist(s)		Sadik Mujkič; Bojan Prešern	Yugoslavia

The men's coxless pair competition at the 1988 Summer Olympics took place at took place at Han River Regatta Course, South Korea.

== Competition format ==
The competition consisted of three main rounds (heats, semifinals, and finals) as well as a repechage. The 18 boats were divided into three heats for the first round, with 6 boats in each heat. The winner of each heat (3 boats total) advanced directly to the semifinals. The remaining 15 boats were placed in the repechage. The repechage featured three heats, with 5 boats in each heat. The top three boats in each repechage heat (9 boats total) advanced to the semifinals. The remaining 6 boats (4th and 5th placers in the repechage heats) were eliminated. The 12 semifinalist boats were divided into two heats of 6 boats each. The top three boats in each semifinal (6 boats total) advanced to the "A" final to compete for medals and 4th through 6th place; the bottom three boats in each semifinal were sent to the "B" final for 7th through 12th.

All races were over a 2000 metre course.

== Results ==
=== Heats ===
The heats were held on 19 September. The winner of each heat advanced to the semifinals, with all others going to the repechage. No boats were eliminated in this round.

==== Heat 1 ====
The first heat featured a warm (18 °C) but rainy day, with 1.0 m/s northwest winds. The Soviet Union led early, with a half-second margin over Romania at 500 metres. The Romanians had a strong second 500 metres, though, and took a halfway lead which they maintained. Belgium slowly but surely moved up from fourth to second; the United States also passed the Soviets in the second half of the race. Brazil took fifth and Canada trailed significantly throughout.

Rank	Rowers	Nation	Time	Notes
1	Dănuț Dobre; Dragoș Neagu	Romania	6:31.95	Q
2	Wim Van Belleghem; Alain Lewuillon	Belgium	6:36.62	R
3	Kurt Bausback; Edward Ives	United States	6:40.16	R
4	Valery Vyrvich; Igor Zuborenko	Soviet Union	6:43.21	R
5	Ricardo de Carvalho; Ronaldo de Carvalho	Brazil	6:45.20	R
6	Don Dickison; David Johnson	Canada	6:57.59	R

==== Heat 2 ====
By the second heat, the rain had stopped but the day remained cloudy. The temperature had risen to 18.9 °C, with calmer winds (0.7 m/s, south-southwest). Yugoslavia led throughout, followed by France most of the way. East Germany passed France in the final 500 metres. Australia, Finland, and Japan were widely spaced in fourth through sixth places.

Rank	Rowers	Nation	Time	Notes
1	Sadik Mujkič; Bojan Prešern	Yugoslavia	6:36.35	Q
2	Carl Ertel; Uwe Gasch	East Germany	6:40.74	R
3	Laurent Lacasa; Alex Perahia	France	6:41.66	R
4	Malcolm Batten; Samuel Patten	Australia	6:46.79	R
5	Aarne Lindroos; Kari Lindroos	Finland	7:00.29	R
6	Maki Kobayashi; Satoru Miyoshi	Japan	7:07.51	R

==== Heat 3 ====
It was cloudy and 17 °C for the third heat, with 0.9 m/s west-southwest wind. The top three places remained static, with Great Britain leading, West Germany second, and Austria third at each quarter mark. The other boats had more changes in position, with Norway starting in fourth before falling back to sixth. Spain ended up in fourth, with Argentina fifth.

Rank	Rowers	Nation	Time	Notes
1	Andy Holmes; Steve Redgrave	Great Britain	6:42.43	Q
2	Frank Dietrich; Michael Twittmann	West Germany	6:45.73	R
3	Hermann Bauer; Karl Sinzinger Jr.	Austria	6:54.62	R
4	Fernando Climent; Luis Lasúrtegui	Spain	6:56.54	R
5	Claudio Águila; Daniel Scuri	Argentina	6:59.05	R
6	Ole Andreassen; Tore Øvrebø	Norway	7:05.78	R

=== Repechage ===
The repechage was held on 21 September. It was a sunny day, with the temperature warming from 15.7 °C for the first heat to 17.3 °C by the third. There were 1.3 m/s south-southwest winds to begin, shifting to east-southeast for the second heat, and calming to 0.3 m/s south-southwest in the third. The top three boats in each heat advanced to the semifinals, with the 4th and 5th placers being eliminated.

==== Repechage heat 1 ====
East Germany took an early lead, with Canada close behind at 500 metres. By the halfway mark, the field had begun to solidify into two groups, with East Germany, the United States, and Finland in the lead group and Spain and Canada (having fallen back to last) in the second group. That grouping, which would eliminate the latter two teams, held through the rest of the race. East Germany briefly fell to third at the 1500 metre mark but regained the lead over the last quarter-race.

Rank	Rowers	Nation	Time	Notes
1	Carl Ertel; Uwe Gasch	East Germany	7:02.15	Q
2	Aarne Lindroos; Kari Lindroos	Finland	7:03.72	Q
3	Kurt Bausback; Edward Ives	United States	7:04.99	Q
4	Fernando Climent; Luis Lasúrtegui	Spain	7:09.10	
5	Don Dickison; David Johnson	Canada	7:13.07	

==== Repechage heat 2 ====
Norway made the only personnel change of the event, swapping Audun Hadler-Olsen in for Ole Andreassen. Australia started strong, leading at the 500 metre and 1000 metre marks. But the Australian rowers had the weakest third quarter of any of the five boats, dropping all the way back to fourth place as Belgium charged from fourth to first. Austria and Brazil were in the second and third places. The leading three increased their separation from fourth-place Australia and fifth-place Norway in the last 500 metres.

Rank	Rowers	Nation	Time	Notes
1	Wim Van Belleghem; Alain Lewuillon	Belgium	6:54.57	Q
2	Hermann Bauer; Karl Sinzinger Jr.	Austria	6:58.96	Q
3	Ricardo de Carvalho; Ronaldo de Carvalho	Brazil	7:01.00	Q
4	Malcolm Batten; Samuel Patten	Australia	7:06.17	
5	Audun Hadler-Olsen; Tore Øvrebø	Norway	7:20.88	

==== Repechage heat 3 ====
France held the lead for most of the race, through the 1500 metre mark. The West Germans were in third at 500 metres but gained on the French over the next two quarters and passed them in the final 500 metres of the race. The Soviet Union came to a relatively easy third-place finish, with Argentina and Japan never seriously threatening to advance.

Rank	Rowers	Nation	Time	Notes
1	Frank Dietrich; Michael Twittmann	West Germany	6:52.03	Q
2	Laurent Lacasa; Alex Perahia	France	6:53.72	Q
3	Valery Vyrvich; Igor Zuborenko	Soviet Union	6:57.39	Q
4	Claudio Águila; Daniel Scuri	Argentina	7:06.57	
5	Maki Kobayashi; Satoru Miyoshi	Japan	7:18.56	

=== Semifinals ===
The semifinals were held on 22 September. It was a sunny and warm day, rising from 19.4 °C to 23.9 °C between the first and second heats. It was windier for the first semifinal (1.8 m/s, south) than the second (0.6 m/s, east-northeast). The top three boats in each heat advanced to the "A" final, while the 4th through 6th place boats went to the "B" final out of medal contention.

==== Semifinal 1 ====
Austria and Finland were not competitive from the start, essentially making this a four-way race for three advancement spots. Yugoslavia led at the 500 metre mark before Romania took control and ran away with the top spot. Two teams from the third repechage, West Germany and the Soviet Union, each spent time in the fourth spot, with the Soviets creating some separation in the third quarter and widening it in the final segment.

Rank	Rowers	Nation	Time	Notes
1	Dănuț Dobre; Dragoș Neagu	Romania	6:46.70	QA
2	Sadik Mujkič; Bojan Prešern	Yugoslavia	6:49.44	QA
3	Valery Vyrvich; Igor Zuborenko	Soviet Union	6:50.49	QA
4	Frank Dietrich; Michael Twittmann	West Germany	6:54.24	QB
5	Hermann Bauer; Karl Sinzinger Jr.	Austria	7:02.66	QB
6	Aarne Lindroos; Kari Lindroos	Finland	7:15.36	QB

==== Semifinal 2 ====
Great Britain took an early, significant lead—over 2.3 seconds by 500 metres—and increased it through the first three-quarters of the race before coasting to the win. France was in second place at 500 metres before falling all the way back to fifth at 1000 metres. The United States was in the second position at the halfway and three-quarter marks, but could not hold the pace and was passed by Belgium, East Germany, and France in the final quarter. Those three had similar splits in the last 500 metres, which kept France from advancing as the French team finished fourth.

Rank	Rowers	Nation	Time	Notes
1	Andy Holmes; Steve Redgrave	Great Britain	6:45.03	QA
2	Wim Van Belleghem; Alain Lewuillon	Belgium	6:47.44	QA
3	Carl Ertel; Uwe Gasch	East Germany	6:48.11	QA
4	Laurent Lacasa; Alex Perahia	France	6:49.03	QB
5	Kurt Bausback; Edward Ives	United States	6:50.47	QB
6	Ricardo de Carvalho; Ronaldo de Carvalho	Brazil	6:54.89	QB

=== Finals ===
==== Final B ====
The classification or "B" final was held on 23 September. It was sunny but cool (13 °C) at race time, with 2.6 m/s east-southeast wind. France and West Germany battled for the lead in this race, with France leading through halfway but West Germany finishing with the win (and 7th place overall). The United States and Brazil were third and fourth, respectively, at each quarter-mark; the Brazilians did have to survive a late press from Finland. Austria fell into last place by a significant margin (nearly a full minute behind the fifth-place Finland) during the third 500 metres, and finished the final quarter in over 4 minutes.

Rank	Rowers	Nation	Time
7	Frank Dietrich; Michael Twittmann	West Germany	7:19.48
8	Laurent Lacasa; Alex Perahia	France	7:22.36
9	Kurt Bausback; Edward Ives	United States	7:26.65
10	Ricardo de Carvalho; Ronaldo de Carvalho	Brazil	7:28.30
11	Aarne Lindroos; Kari Lindroos	Finland	7:28.46
12	Hermann Bauer; Karl Sinzinger Jr.	Austria	10:45.56

==== Final A ====
The main or "A" final was held on 24 September, a sunny 20.1 °C day with 2.2 m/s northeast wind. The three heat winners maintained the top three positions throughout, with Great Britain in first, Romania in second, and Yugoslavia in third. Belgium was sixth through the 500 metre mark, but moved up to fourth by halfway and stayed there. East Germany and the Soviet Union were also fairly well locked into the fifth and sixth places, respectively, at halfway. No boat finished within a second of another.

Rank	Rowers	Nation	Time
1st place, gold medalist(s)	Andy Holmes; Steve Redgrave	Great Britain	6:36.84
2nd place, silver medalist(s)	Dănuț Dobre; Dragoș Neagu	Romania	6:38.06
3rd place, bronze medalist(s)	Sadik Mujkič; Bojan Prešern	Yugoslavia	6:41.01
4	Wim Van Belleghem; Alain Lewuillon	Belgium	6:45.47
5	Carl Ertel; Uwe Gasch	East Germany	6:48.86
6	Valery Vyrvich; Igor Zuborenko	Soviet Union	6:51.11

== Final classification ==
Rank	Rowers	Country
1st place, gold medalist(s)	Andy Holmes; Steve Redgrave	Great Britain
2nd place, silver medalist(s)	Dănuț Dobre; Dragoș Neagu	Romania
3rd place, bronze medalist(s)	Sadik Mujkič; Bojan Prešern	Yugoslavia
4	Alain Lewuillon; Wim Van Belleghem	Belgium
5	Carl Ertel; Uwe Gasch	East Germany
6	Igor Zuborenko; Valery Vyrvich	Soviet Union
7	Frank Dietrich; Michael Twittmann	West Germany
8	Laurent Lacasa; Alex Perahia	France
9	Kurt Bausback; Edward Ives	United States
10	Ricardo de Carvalho; Ronaldo de Carvalho	Brazil
11	Aarne Lindroos; Kari Lindroos	Finland
12	Hermann Bauer; Karl Sinzinger Jr.	Austria
13	Fernando Climent; Luis Lasúrtegui	Spain
13	Malcolm Batten; Samuel Patten	Australia
13	Claudio Águila; Daniel Scuri	Argentina
16	Don Dickison; David Johnson	Canada
16	Audun Hadler-Olsen; Tore Øvrebø; Ole Andreassen	Norway
16	Maki Kobayashi; Satoru Miyoshi	Japan
