= Rowing at the 1992 Summer Olympics – Men's coxed pair =

Men's coxed pair at the Games of the XXV Olympiad
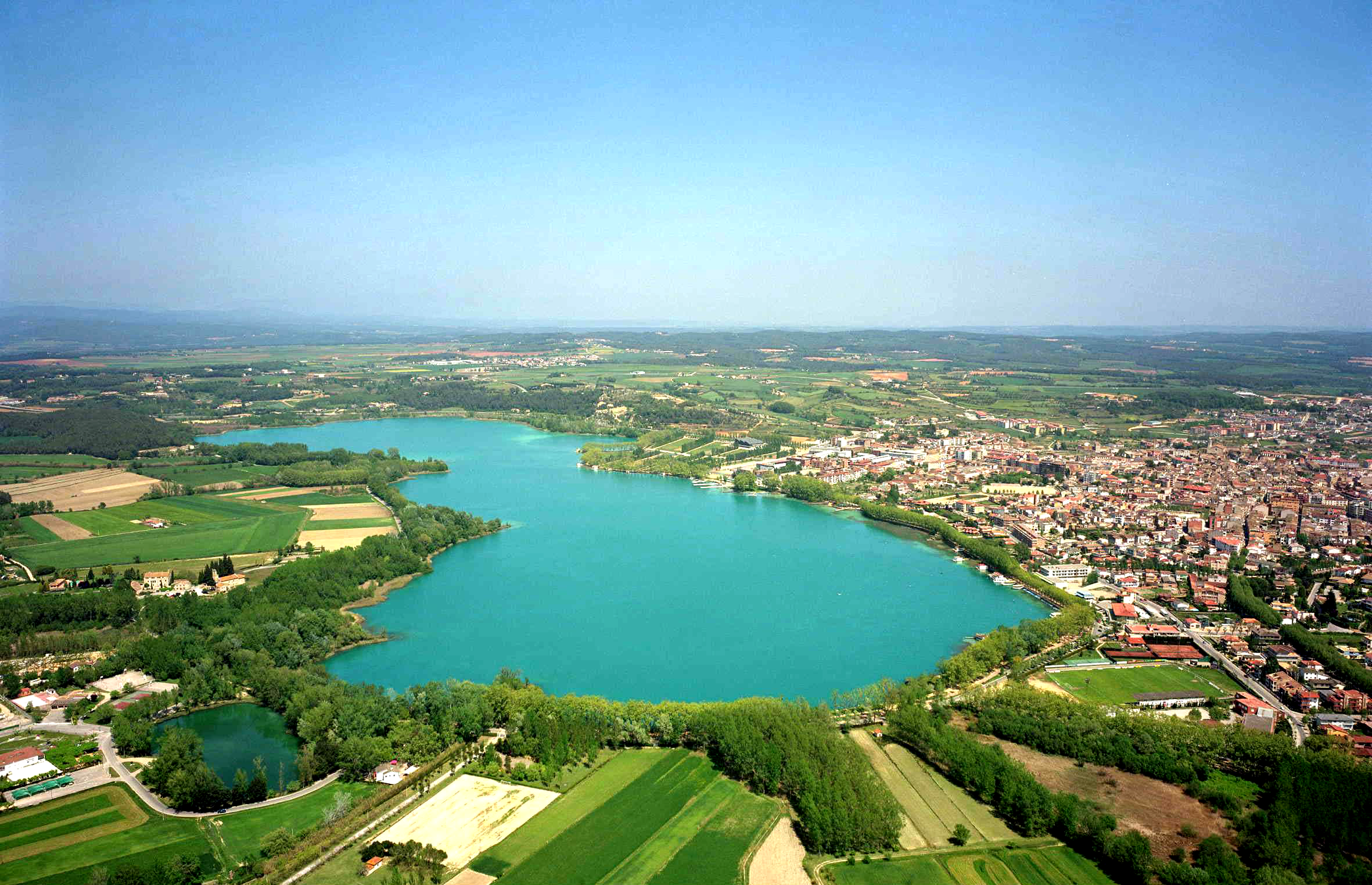
- Lake of Banyoles
- Venue: Lake of Banyoles
- Dates: 28 July – 2 August 1992
- Competitors: 49 from 16 nations
- Winning time: 6:49.83

Medalists
1st place, gold medalist(s)		Greg Searle; Jonny Searle; Garry Herbert (cox); Great Britain
2nd place, silver medalist(s)		Carmine Abbagnale; Giuseppe Abbagnale; Giuseppe Di Capua (cox); Italy
3rd place, bronze medalist(s)		Dimitrie Popescu; Nicolae Țaga; Dumitru Răducanu (cox); Romania

The men's coxed pair competition at the 1992 Summer Olympics took place at Lake of Banyoles, Spain. It was held from 28 July to 2 August. There were 16 boats (49 competitors, with Czechoslovakia making one substitution) from 16 nations, with each nation limited to one boat in the event. The event was won by brothers Greg and Jonny Searle and coxswain Garry Herbert of Great Britain, the nation's first victory in the event. It was the third consecutive Games with brothers winning as the rowers; Italy's Carmine Abbagnale and Giuseppe Abbagnale had won in 1984 and 1988. They, along with longtime cox Giuseppe Di Capua, took silver this year, becoming the only crew to win three medals together in the event (only one other man, Conn Findlay, had earned three medals, with three different rowing partners and two different coxswains). Bronze went to Romanians Dimitrie Popescu, Nicolae Țaga, and cox Dumitru Răducanu. Popescu and Răducanu had been on the 1984 silver medal team, making them the 16th and 17th—and final—men to earn multiple medals in the event.

== Background ==
This was the 18th and final appearance of the event. Rowing had been on the programme in 1896 but was cancelled due to bad weather. The men's coxed pair was one of the original four events in 1900, but was not held in 1904, 1908, or 1912. It returned to the programme after World War I and was held every Games from 1924 to 1992, when it (along with the men's coxed four) was replaced with the men's lightweight double sculls and men's lightweight coxless four.

Five of the 18 competitors from the 1988 coxed pair Final A returned: the two-time reigning champions Carmine Abbagnale, Giuseppe Abbagnale, and Giuseppe Di Capua of Italy; fourth-place rower Dimitrie Popescu of Romania, reunited with his 1984 silver-medal teammate coxswain Dumitru Răducanu; and fifth-place cox Stefan Stoykov of Bulgaria. The Italian crew was exceptionally consistent (having rowed together for three full Olympic cycles) and was an overwhelming favourite, with four consecutive World Championships (and 7 of 9 starting in 1981, with silver and bronze in the other two years) along with their two Olympic golds.

Lithuania made its debut in the event, while some other former Soviet republics competed as the Unified Team. The United States made its 15th appearance, most among nations.

== Competition format ==
The coxed pair event featured three-person boats, with two rowers and a coxswain. It was a sweep rowing event, with the rowers each having one oar (and thus each rowing on one side). The course used the 2000 metres distance that became the Olympic standard in 1912.

The competition consisted of three main rounds (quarterfinals, semifinals, and finals) as well as a repechage. The 16 boats were divided into three heats for the first round, with 5 or 6 boats in each heat. The winner of each heat (3 boats total) advanced directly to the semifinals. The remaining 13 boats were placed in the repechage. The repechage featured three heats, with 4 or 5 boats in each heat. The top three boats in each repechage heat (9 boats total) advanced to the semifinals. The remaining 4 boats in the repechage (4th and 5th placers) were placed in the "C" final to compete for 13th through 16th places.

The 12 semifinalist boats were divided into two heats of 6 boats each. The top three boats in each semifinal (6 boats total) advanced to the "A" final to compete for medals and 4th through 6th place; the bottom three boats in each semifinal were sent to the "B" final for 7th through 12th.

== Schedule ==
All times are Central European Summer Time (UTC+2)

Date	Time	Round
Tuesday, 28 July 1992	9:20	Quarterfinals
Wednesday, 29 July 1992	17:40	Repechage
Friday, 31 July 1992	11:00	Semifinals
Sunday, 2 August 1992	8:20	Finals

== Results ==
=== Quarterfinals ===
==== Quarterfinal 1 ====
Rank	Rowers	Coxswain	Nation	Time	Notes
1	Piotr Basta; Tomasz Mruczkowski	Bartosz Sroga	Poland	7:02.12	Q
2	Patrick Berthou; Laurent Lacasa	Emmanuel Bunoz	France	7:03.77	R
3	José Ignacio Bugarín; Ibon Urbieta	Javier Cano	Spain	7:04.67	R
4	Dietmar Kuttelwascher; Volkmar Kuttelwascher	Markus Irle	Austria	7:14.29	R
5	Michal Dalecký; Dušan Macháček	Oldřich Hejdušek	Czechoslovakia	7:16.87	R
6	Carlos de Almeida; Cláudio Tavares	Carlos Sobrinho	Brazil	7:18.62	R

==== Quarterfinal 2 ====
Rank	Rowers	Coxswain	Nation	Time	Notes
1	Greg Searle; Jonny Searle	Garry Herbert	Great Britain	6:54.31	Q
2	Dimitrie Popescu; Nicolae Țaga	Dumitru Răducanu	Romania	6:54.87	R
3	Ismael Carbonell; Arnaldo Rodríguez	Roberto Ojeda	Cuba	7:04.67	R
4	Michael Peter; Thomas Woddow	Peter Thiede	Germany	7:07.60	R
5	Ivaylo Banchev; Yordan Danchev	Stefan Stoykov	Bulgaria	8:03.56	R

==== Quarterfinal 3 ====
Rank	Rowers	Coxswain	Nation	Time	Notes
1	Carmine Abbagnale; Giuseppe Abbagnale	Giuseppe Di Capua	Italy	7:00.62	Q
2	Juozas Bagdonas; Einius Petkus	Valdemaras Mačiulskis	Lithuania	7:04.41	R
3	John Moore; Aaron Pollock	Stephen Shellans Jr.	United States	7:04.78	R
4	Valery Belodedov; Dmitry Nos	Anatoly Korbut	Unified Team	7:22.61	R
5	Gustavo Pacheco; Marcelo Pieretti	Andrés Seperizza	Argentina	7:39.52	R

=== Repechage ===
==== Repechage heat 1 ====
Rank	Rowers	Coxswain	Nation	Time	Notes
1	Ismael Carbonell; Arnaldo Rodríguez	Roberto Ojeda	Cuba	7:06.83	Q
2	Patrick Berthou; Laurent Lacasa	Emmanuel Bunoz	France	7:08.63	Q
3	Valery Belodedov; Dmitry Nos	Anatoly Korbut	Unified Team	7:11.45	Q
4	Dušan Macháček; Pavel Sokol	Oldřich Hejdušek	Czechoslovakia	7:30.64	QC

==== Repechage heat 2 ====
Rank	Rowers	Coxswain	Nation	Time	Notes
1	Dimitrie Popescu; Nicolae Țaga	Dumitru Răducanu	Romania	7:05.04	Q
2	John Moore; Aaron Pollock	Stephen Shellans Jr.	United States	7:08.41	Q
3	Dietmar Kuttelwascher; Volkmar Kuttelwascher	Markus Irle	Austria	7:21.06	Q
4	Ivaylo Banchev; Yordan Danchev	Stefan Stoykov	Bulgaria	7:33.73	QC

==== Repechage heat 3 ====
Rank	Rowers	Coxswain	Nation	Time	Notes
1	Michael Peter; Thomas Woddow	Peter Thiede	Germany	7:12.78	Q
2	Juozas Bagdonas; Einius Petkus	Valdemaras Mačiulskis	Lithuania	7:14.10	Q
3	José Ignacio Bugarín; Ibon Urbieta	Javier Cano	Spain	7:17.82	Q
4	Carlos de Almeida; Cláudio Tavares	Carlos Sobrinho	Brazil	7:21.51	QC
5	Gustavo Pacheco; Marcelo Pieretti	Andrés Seperizza	Argentina	7:32.70	QC

=== Semifinals ===
==== Semifinal 1 ====
Rank	Rowers	Coxswain	Nation	Time	Notes
1	Greg Searle; Jonny Searle	Garry Herbert	Great Britain	6:52.05	QA
2	Michael Peter; Thomas Woddow	Peter Thiede	Germany	6:53.53	QA
3	Patrick Berthou; Laurent Lacasa	Emmanuel Bunoz	France	6:53.96	QA
4	Piotr Basta; Tomasz Mruczkowski	Bartosz Sroga	Poland	6:53.97	QB
5	John Moore; Aaron Pollock	Stephen Shellans Jr.	United States	6:54.78	QB
6	José Ignacio Bugarín; Ibon Urbieta	Javier Cano	Spain	7:03.99	QB

==== Semifinal 2 ====
Rank	Rowers	Coxswain	Nation	Time	Notes
1	Carmine Abbagnale; Giuseppe Abbagnale	Giuseppe Di Capua	Italy	6:56.29	QA
2	Dimitrie Popescu; Nicolae Țaga	Dumitru Răducanu	Romania	6:56.90	QA
3	Ismael Carbonell; Arnaldo Rodríguez	Roberto Ojeda	Cuba	6:59.11	QA
4	Juozas Bagdonas; Einius Petkus	Valdemaras Mačiulskis	Lithuania	7:03.89	QB
5	Dietmar Kuttelwascher; Volkmar Kuttelwascher	Markus Irle	Austria	7:05.89	QB
6	Valery Belodedov; Dmitry Nos	Anatoly Korbut	Unified Team	7:06.08	QB

=== Finals ===
==== Final C ====
Rank	Rowers	Coxswain	Nation	Time
13	Carlos de Almeida; Cláudio Tavares	Carlos Sobrinho	Brazil	7:32.49
14	Gustavo Pacheco; Marcelo Pieretti	Andrés Seperizza	Argentina	7:37.76
15	Ivaylo Banchev; Yordan Danchev	Stefan Stoykov	Bulgaria	7:38.25
16	Dušan Macháček; Pavel Sokol	Oldřich Hejdušek	Czechoslovakia	DNS

==== Final B ====
Rank	Rowers	Coxswain	Nation	Time
7	Piotr Basta; Tomasz Mruczkowski	Bartosz Sroga	Poland	7:04.37
8	John Moore; Aaron Pollock	Stephen Shellans Jr.	United States	7:04.84
9	Juozas Bagdonas; Einius Petkus	Valdemaras Mačiulskis	Lithuania	7:04.98
10	Dietmar Kuttelwascher; Volkmar Kuttelwascher	Markus Irle	Austria	7:12.40
11	Valery Belodedov; Dmitry Nos	Anatoly Korbut	Unified Team	7:13.10
12	José Ignacio Bugarín; Ibon Urbieta	Javier Cano	Spain	7:15.25

==== Final A ====
Rank	Rowers	Coxswain	Nation	Time	Notes
1st place, gold medalist(s)	Greg Searle; Jonny Searle	Garry Herbert	Great Britain	6:49.83	OB
2nd place, silver medalist(s)	Carmine Abbagnale; Giuseppe Abbagnale	Giuseppe Di Capua	Italy	6:50.98	
3rd place, bronze medalist(s)	Dimitrie Popescu; Nicolae Țaga	Dumitru Răducanu	Romania	6:51.58	
4	Michael Peter; Thomas Woddow	Peter Thiede	Germany	6:56.98	
5	Ismael Carbonell; Arnaldo Rodríguez	Roberto Ojeda	Cuba	6:58.26	
6	Patrick Berthou; Laurent Lacasa	Emmanuel Bunoz	France	7:03.01	

== Final classification ==
The following rowers took part:

Rank	Rowers	Coxswain	Nation
1st place, gold medalist(s)	Greg Searle; Jonny Searle	Garry Herbert	Great Britain
2nd place, silver medalist(s)	Carmine Abbagnale; Giuseppe Abbagnale	Giuseppe Di Capua	Italy
3rd place, bronze medalist(s)	Dimitrie Popescu; Nicolae Țaga	Dumitru Răducanu	Romania
4	Thomas Woddow; Michael Peter	Peter Thiede	Germany
5	Ismael Carbonell; Arnaldo Rodríguez	Roberto Ojeda	Cuba
6	Patrick Berthou; Laurent Lacasa	Emmanuel Bunoz	France
7	Piotr Basta; Tomasz Mruczkowski	Bartosz Sroga	Poland
8	Aaron Pollock; John Moore	Stephen Shellans Jr.	United States
9	Juozas Bagdonas; Einius Petkus	Valdemaras Mačiulskis	Lithuania
10	Volkmar Kuttelwascher; Dietmar Kuttelwascher	Markus Irle	Austria
11	Valery Belodedov; Dmitry Nos	Anatoly Korbut	Unified Team
12	José Ignacio Bugarín; Ibon Urbieta	Javier Cano	Spain
13	Cláudio Tavares; Carlos de Almeida	Carlos Sobrinho	Brazil
14	Marcelo Pieretti; Gustavo Pacheco	Andrés Seperizza	Argentina
15	Ivaylo Banchev; Yordan Danchev	Stefan Stoykov	Bulgaria
16	Michal Dalecký (quarters); Dušan Macháček; Pavel Sokol (repechage, finals)	Oldřich Hejdušek	Czechoslovakia
