= Rowing at the 2000 Summer Olympics – Men's coxless pair =

Men's coxless pair at the Games of the XXVII Olympiad
- Venue: Sydney International Regatta Centre
- Date: 17–23 September 2000
- Competitors: 30 from 15 nations
- Winning time: 6:32.97

Medalists
1st place, gold medalist(s)		Michel Andrieux; Jean-Christophe Rolland	France
2nd place, silver medalist(s)		Ted Murphy; Sebastian Bea	United States
3rd place, bronze medalist(s)		Matthew Long; James Tomkins	Australia

The men's coxless pair competition at the 2000 Summer Olympics in Sydney, Australia took place at Sydney International Regatta Centre.

== Competition format ==
This rowing event was a sweep event, meaning that each rower has one oar and rows on only one side. Two rowers crewed each boat, with no coxswain. The competition consists of multiple rounds. Finals were held to determine the placing of each boat; these finals were given letters with those nearer to the beginning of the alphabet meaning a better ranking. Semifinals were named based on which finals they fed, with each semifinal having two possible finals.

With 15 boats in with heats, the best boats qualify directly for the semi-finals. All other boats progress to the repechage round, which offers a second chance to qualify for the semi-finals. The best three boats in each of the two semi-finals qualify for final A, which determines places 1–6 (including the medals). Unsuccessful boats from semi-finals A/B go forward to final B, which determines places 7–12. The remaining three boats are automatically eliminated from the competition.

== Schedule ==
All times are Australian Time (UTC+10)

Date	Time	Round
Sunday, 17 September 2000	10:10	Heats
Tuesday, 19 September 2000	10:10	Repechages
Thursday, 21 September 2000	09:10	Semifinals
Friday, 22 September 2000	10:40	Final B
Saturday, 23 September 2000	09:30	Final

== Results ==
=== Heats ===
The first three finishers of each heat advanced to the semifinals, remainder goes to the repechage.

==== Heat 1 ====
Rank	Rower	Country	Time	Notes
1	Michel Andrieux; Jean-Christophe Rolland	France	6:44.80	Q
2	Luigi Sorrentino; Pasquale Panzarino	Italy	6:48.26	Q
3	Oliver Martinov; Ninoslav Saraga	Croatia	6:52.57	Q
4	Damian Ordás; Diego Aguirregomezcorta	Argentina	6:55.74	R
5	Kasam Khan; Inderpal Singh	India	7:09.94	R

==== Heat 2 ====
Rank	Rower	Country	Time	Notes
1	Đorđe Višacki; Nikola Stojić	FR Yugoslavia	6:42.62	Q
2	Ramon di Clemente; Donovan Cech	South Africa	6:43.23	Q
3	Ted Murphy; Sebastian Bea	United States	6:44.86	Q
4	Robert Sens; Detlef Kirchhoff	Germany	7:10.62	R
5	Amir Temraz; Alaa El-Din Ahmed	Egypt	7:15.63	R

==== Heat 3 ====
Rank	Rower	Country	Time	Notes
1	Edward Coode; Greg Searle	Great Britain	6:42.45	Q
2	Matthew Long; James Tomkins	Australia	6:46.99	Q
3	Phil Graham; Henry Hering	Canada	6:48.42	Q
4	Miha Pirih; Gregor Sračnjek	Slovenia	6:55.82	R
5	Piotr Basta; Piotr Bochenek	Poland	6:58.47	R

=== Repechage ===
First three qualify for semifinals A/B, the rest are eliminated.

Rank	Rower	Country	Time	Notes
1	Robert Sens; Detlef Kirchhoff	Germany	6:45.73	Q
2	Piotr Basta; Piotr Bochenek	Poland	6:48.74	Q
3	Miha Pirih; Gregor Sračnjek	Slovenia	6:50.49	Q
4	Damian Ordás; Diego Aguirregomezcorta	Argentina	6:52.38	
5	Amir Temraz; Alaa El-Din Ahmed	Egypt	7:07.35	
6	Kasam Khan; Inderpal Singh	India	7:16.10	

=== Semifinals ===
First three qualify to Final A, remainder to Final B.

==== Semifinal 1 ====
Rank	Rower	Country	Time	Notes
1	Michel Andrieux; Jean-Christophe Rolland	France	6:30.96	A
2	Edward Coode; Greg Searle	Great Britain	6:31.08	A
3	Ramon di Clemente; Donovan Cech	South Africa	6:33.15	A
4	Phil Graham; Henry Hering	Canada	6:33.22	B
5	Piotr Basta; Piotr Bochenek	Poland	6:43.38	B
6	Oliver Martinov; Ninoslav Saraga	Croatia	6:46.00	B

==== Semifinal 2 ====
Rank	Rower	Country	Time	Notes
1	Matthew Long; James Tomkins	Australia	6:34.42	A
2	Đorđe Višacki; Nikola Stojić	FR Yugoslavia	6:34.93	A
3	Ted Murphy; Sebastian Bea	United States	6:35.42	A
4	Robert Sens; Detlef Kirchhoff	Germany	6:38.41	B
5	Miha Pirih; Gregor Sračnjek	Slovenia	6:49.79	B
6	Luigi Sorrentino; Pasquale Panzarino	Italy	6:53.57	B

=== Finals ===
==== Final B ====
Held on 22 September 2000

Rank	Rower	Country	Time	Notes
1	Phil Graham; Henry Hering	Canada	6:33.60	
2	Oliver Martinov; Ninoslav Saraga	Croatia	6:35.18	
3	Robert Sens; Detlef Kirchhoff	Germany	6:37.94	
4	Piotr Basta; Piotr Bochenek	Poland	6:39.44	
5	Miha Pirih; Gregor Sračnjek	Slovenia	6:40.23	
6	Luigi Sorrentino; Pasquale Panzarino	Italy	6:40.35	

==== Final A ====
Rank	Rower	Country	Time	Notes
1st place, gold medalist(s)	Michel Andrieux; Jean-Christophe Rolland	France	6:32.97	
2nd place, silver medalist(s)	Ted Murphy; Sebastian Bea	United States	6:33.80	
3rd place, bronze medalist(s)	Matthew Long; James Tomkins	Australia	6:34.26	
4	Edward Coode; Greg Searle	Great Britain	6:34.38	
5	Đorđe Višacki; Nikola Stojić	FR Yugoslavia	6:38.70	
6	Ramon di Clemente; Donovan Cech	South Africa	6:43.10	
