= Lindroos =

Lindroos is a Swedish surname primarily used by Swedish-speaking Finns. Notable people with the surname include:

- Aarne Lindroos (born 1960), Finnish rower
- Alfred Lindroos (1883–1937), Finnish metalworker, civil servant, politician
- Bengt Lindroos (1918–2010), Swedish architect
- Carol Lindroos (1930–2001), Finnish discus thrower
- Heikki Lindroos (1865–1915), Finnish cooperative manager, politician
- Jari Lindroos (born 1961), retired professional ice hockey player
- Kari Lindroos (born 1962), Finnish rower
- Lennart Lindroos (1886–1921), Finnish breaststroke swimmer
- Mauno Lindroos (born 1941), Finnish weightlifter
- Nicole Lindroos, game designer, primarily on role-playing games
- Peter Lindroos (1944–2003), Finnish opera singer
- Petri Lindroos (born 1980), heavy metal guitarist and vocalist
- Reino Lindroos (1918–1976), Finnish field hockey player
- Rikard Lindroos (born 1985), Finnish footballer
