= David Weightman =

David Weightman may refer to:

- David Weightman (footballer), English professional footballer
- David Weightman (rower) (born 1971), Australian rower
