= Lorgen =

Lorgen is a surname. Notable people with this surname include:

- Snorre Lorgen (born 1969), Norwegian rower
- Sverke Lorgen (born 1973), Norwegian rower

== See also ==
- Loren
