= Gasch =

Gasch is a surname. Notable people with the surname include:

- Oliver Gasch (1906–1999), American judge
- Uwe Gasch (born 1961), German rower
