= Hadler =

Hadler is a surname. Notable people with the surname include:

- Åge Hadler (born 1944), Norwegian orienteering competitor
- Audun Hadler-Olsen (born 1969), Norwegian rower
- Ingrid Hadler (born 1946), Norwegian orienteering competitor
- Jayden Hadler (born 1993), Australian swimmer
- Loretta King Hadler (1917–2007), American actress
- Mary Hadler (1902–1971), American songwriter
- Tom Hadler (born 1996), English footballer

== See also ==
- Hadler, Minnesota, is an unincorporated community in Norman County, in the U.S. state of Minnesota
