= Panzarino =

Panzarino is an Italian surname. Notable people with the surname include:

- Connie Panzarino (1947–2001), American writer and activist for disability rights and LGBTQ rights
- Pasquale Panzarino (born 1972), Italian rower
