= Yumiko Suzuki =

Yumiko Suzuki may refer to:

- Yumiko Suzuki (canoeist) (鈴木 祐美子, born 1976), Japanese sprint canoeist
- Yumiko Suzuki (cyclist) (鈴木 裕美子, born 1960), Japanese cyclist
- Yumiko Suzuki (manga artist) (鈴木由美子, born 1960), Japanese manga artist
