= Berthou =

Berthou is a surname, and may refer to:

- Gwilherm Berthou (1908–1951), Breton nationalist terrorist and neo-Druidic bardic poet
- Erwan Berthou (1861–1933), French and Breton language poet, writer and neo-Druidic bard
- Éric Berthou (born 1980), French road bicycle racer
- Jacques Berthou (born 1940), French politician
- Patrick Berthou (born 1963), French rower
