= Tore Øvrebø =

Norwegian rower

Personal information
- Nationality: Norwegian
- Born: 25 August 1965 (age 59); Stavanger, Norway

Sport
- Sport: Rowing

Tore Øvrebø (born 25 August 1965) is a Norwegian rower. He competed in the men's coxless pair event at the 1988 Summer Olympics.

Øvrebø has also been a rowing coach, coaching Olaf Tufte. In 2013, he became acting director of Olympiatoppen, succeeding Jarle Aambø. The position was later made permanent.
