= Kuffer =

Kuffer or Küffer is a surname. Notable people with the surname include:

- Christoph Küffer (born 1968), Swiss rower
- Erwin Kuffer (born 1943), Luxembourg footballer
- Michael Kuffer (born 1972), German politician
- Michael kuffer (born 1979)

== See also ==
- Kuffner (surname)
- Küfner
