= Kim Holmen =

Norwegian footballer (born 1982)

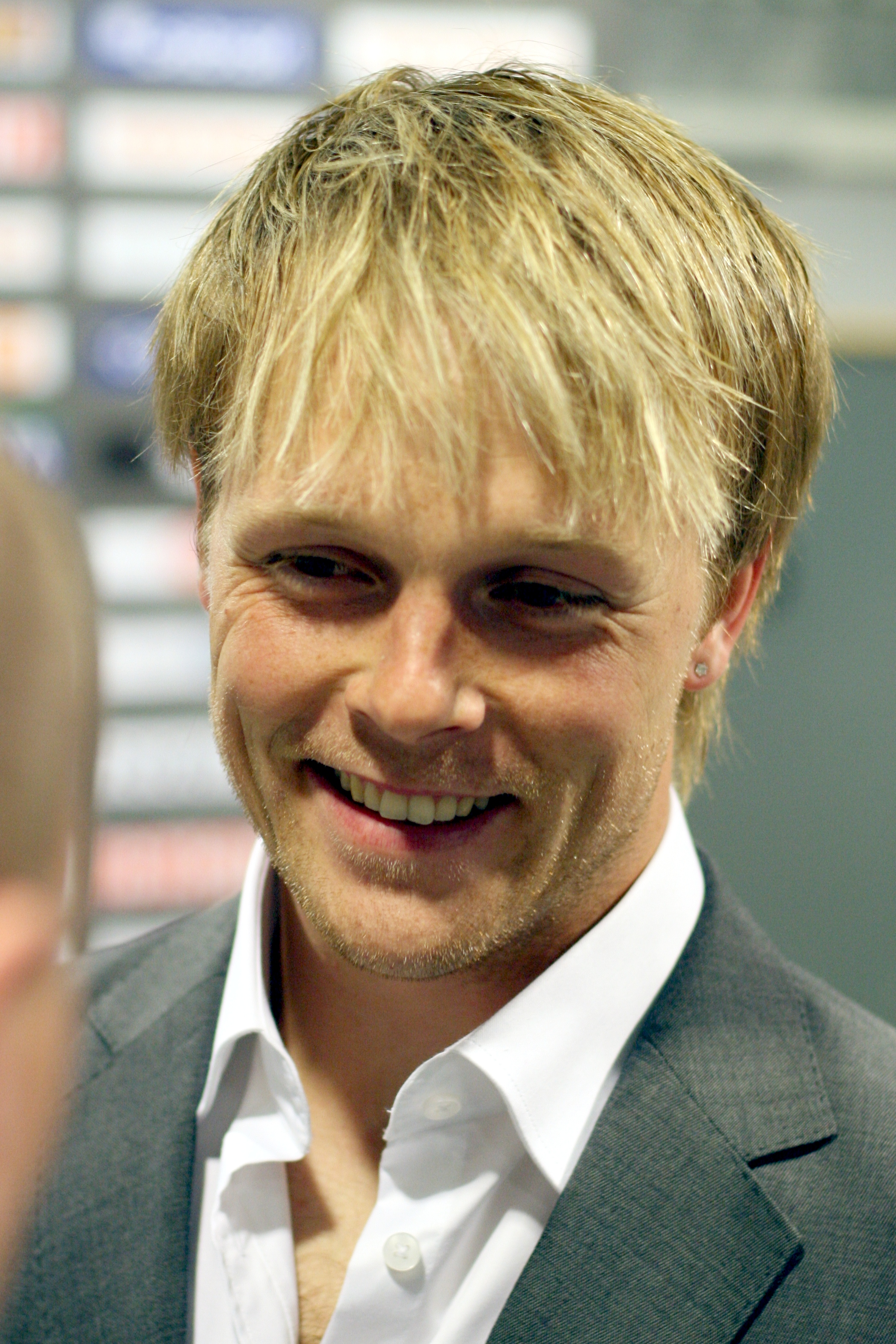

Personal information
- Full name: Kim Kristian Holmen
- Date of birth: 14 July 1982 (age 44)
- Place of birth: Oslo, Norway
- Height: 1.80 m (5 ft 11 in)
- Position: Striker

Team information
- Current team: Lyn
- Number: 14

Youth career
- Vestli
- 1999–2000: Skeid

Senior career*
Years	Team	Apps	(Gls)
2001–2002	Skeid	13	(0)
2003	Grorud		
2004–2006	Lørenskog	??	(42)
2007–2009	Lyn	71	(12)
2010–2011	Kongsvinger	56	(7)
2012	Ull/Kisa	28	(4)
2014–	Lyn	4	(1)
- * Club domestic league appearances and goals

Kim Kristian Holmen (born 14 July 1982) is a Norwegian football striker who plays for Lyn Fotball.

His record on the 40-meter is 4.63. This is the fastest speed ever seen in the Norwegian academy Toppidrettssenteret.

== Career statistics ==
Season	Club	Division	League		Cup		Total	
Season	Club	Division	Apps	Goals	Apps	Goals	Apps	Goals
2007	Lyn	Tippeligaen	21	4	4	2	25	6
2008	Lyn	Tippeligaen	26	7	4	3	30	10
2009	Lyn	Tippeligaen	24	1	4	5	28	6
2010	Kongsvinger	Tippeligaen	28	1	4	0	32	1
2011	Kongsvinger	Adeccoligaen	28	6	3	2	31	8
2012	Ull/Kisa	Adeccoligaen	28	4	3	0	31	4
2014	Lyn	2. divisjon	4	1	2	0	6	1
Career Total			152	21	22	12	174	33
