= José Ignacio Bugarín =

Spanish rower

Personal information
- Full name: José Ignacio Bugarín Pereira
- Born: 10 March 1968 (age 58) Tuy, Pontevedra, Spain

Sport
- Country: Spain
- Sport: Rowing
Medal record
World Championships
Silver medal – second place	1991 Vienna	Coxed pair (M2+)

José Ignacio Bugarín Pereira (Note: In this Spanish name, the first or paternal surname is Bugarín and the second or maternal family name is Pereira.) (born 10 March 1968) is a Spanish rower. He and Ibon Urbieta competed in the men's coxed pair event at the 1992 Summer Olympics.
