= Bausback =

Bausback is a German surname. Notable people with the surname include:

- Emily Bausback (2002), Canadian retired figure skater
- Kurt Bausback (1960), American rower
- Winfried Bausback (1965), German politician
