= Kodama =

Kodama may refer to:

- Kodama (spirit), a spirit in Japanese folklore
- Kodama (surname), a Japanese surname
- Kodama (train), a Japanese bullet train service
- Kodama, Saitama, a town located in Kodama District, Saitama, Japan
- Kodama Station, a train station located in Honjō, Saitama, Japan
- Kodama (album), a 2016 album by Alcest
