= Alex Perahia =

French rower

Personal information
- Full name: Alexandre Perahia
- Nationality: French
- Born: 23 July 1962 (age 62)

Sport
- Sport: Rowing

Alexandre Perahia (born 23 July 1962) is a French rower. He competed in the men's coxless pair event at the 1988 Summer Olympics.
