= Zlatko Bužina =

Croatian rower

Zlatko Buzina
Personal information
- Nationality: Croatian
- Born: 6 March 1966 (age 59); Zagreb, Croatia

Sport
- Sport: Rowing

Zlatko Buzina (born 6 March 1966) is a Croatian rower. He competed in the men's coxless pair event at the 1992 Summer Olympics.
