= Joann Burke =

New Zealand cyclist

Personal information
- Full name: Joann Burke
- Born: 3 November 1969 (age 56) Ōtāhuhu, New Zealand

Cycling career
- Sport: Cycling
- Discipline: Road cycling
- Role: Rider

Joann Burke (born 3 November 1969) is a road cyclist from New Zealand. She was born in Ōtāhuhu. She represented her nation at the 1992 Summer Olympics in the women's road race.
