= Dmitry Nos =

Soviet rower

Personal information
- Nationality: Soviet
- Born: 21 January 1970 (age 55)

Sport
- Sport: Rowing

Dmitry Nos (born 21 January 1970) is a Soviet rower. He competed in the men's coxed pair event at the 1992 Summer Olympics.
