= Anatoly Korbut =

Soviet rower

Personal information
- Full name: Anatoly Viktorovich Korbut
- Nationality: Soviet
- Born: 6 September 1973 (age 51)

Sport
- Sport: Rowing

Anatoly Korbut (born 6 September 1973) is a Soviet rower. He competed in the men's coxed pair event at the 1992 Summer Olympics.
