= Stephen Shellans Jr. =

American rower

Personal information
- Nationality: American
- Born: July 13, 1960 (age 66) Summit, New Jersey, United States

Sport
- Sport: Rowing

Stephen Shellans Jr. (born July 13, 1960) is an American rower. He competed in the men's coxed pair event at the 1992 Summer Olympics.
