= Dmitriy Mironchik =

Belarusian rower

Personal information
- Nationality: Belarusian
- Born: 25 January 1970 (age 55)

Sport
- Sport: Rowing

Dmitriy Mironchik (born 25 January 1970) is a Belarusian rower. He competed in the men's coxless pair event at the 1996 Summer Olympics.
