= Michael Peter (rower) =

German rower

Personal information
- Nationality: German
- Born: 8 September 1968 (age 56)

Sport
- Sport: Rowing

Michael Peter (born 8 September 1968) is a German rower. He competed in the men's coxed pair event at the 1992 Summer Olympics.
