= Matthew McArdle =

Australian rower

Personal information
- Nationality: Australian
- Born: 2 September 1971 (age 53)

Sport
- Sport: Rowing

Matthew McArdle (born 2 September 1971) is an Australian rower. He competed in the men's coxless pair event at the 1992 Summer Olympics.
