= Orlin Ninov =

Bulgarian rower

Personal information
- Nationality: Bulgarian
- Born: 27 June 1970 (age 54); Plovdiv, Bulgaria

Sport
- Sport: Rowing

Orlin Ninov (Bulgarian: Орлин Нинов, born 27 June 1970) is a Bulgarian rower. He competed in the men's coxless pair event at the 1996 Summer Olympics.
