= Mitsuru Kimura =

Japanese rower (born 1970)

Personal information
- Nationality: Japanese
- Born: 6 November 1970 (age 54); Hokkaido, Japan

Sport
- Sport: Rowing

Mitsuru Kimura (木村 満, Kimura Mitsuru, born 6 November 1970) is a Japanese rower. He competed in the men's coxless pair event at the 1992 Summer Olympics.
