= Stefan Stoykov (rowing) =

Bulgarian rowing cox

Personal information
- Nationality: Bulgarian
- Born: 7 October 1953 (age 72)

Sport
- Sport: Rowing
Medal record
Men's rowing
Representing Bulgaria
World Rowing Championships
Gold medal – first place	1977 Amsterdam	Coxed pair

Stefan Stoykov (Bulgarian: Стефан Стойков; born 7 October 1953) is a Bulgarian rowing coxswain.

Stoykov's first international appearance was at the 1977 World Rowing Championships where he coxed the Bulgarian pair to win the world championship. Subsequent world championship appearances in 1979, 1981, 1983 and 1985 had sixth place as the best result.

Stoykov competed at the 1988 Summer Olympics in the coxed pair and they came fifth. At the 1989 World Rowing Championships he coxed the men's eight to sixth place. At the 1991 World Rowing Championships, his coxed pair came second in the C-final.

His final international appearance was at the 1992 Summer Olympics where he came 15th in the coxed pair.
