= Nick McDonald-Crowley =

Australian rower

Personal information
- Nationality: Australian
- Born: 19 March 1968 (age 58)
- Education: Canberra Grammar School
- Years active: 1984-1999

Sport
- Country: Australia
- Sport: Rowing
- Club: Canberra Rowing Club
Medal record
Representing Australia
World Rowing Championships
Silver medal – second place	1997 Aigubelette	M2+

Nick McDonald-Crowley (born 19 March 1968) is an Australian former rower, a 1992 Olympian who competed and won a silver medal at World Championships.

== Club and state rowing ==
McDonald-Crowley was educated at Canberra Grammar School where he took up rowing. He rowed in that school's first eight in 1984 and 1985. He first competed at the Australian Rowing Championships in 1986 when he contested and won the men's U19 coxless pair national title in Canberra Grammar colours with Hugh Baird.

His senior club rowing was from the Canberra Rowing Club. In 1988 he raced in a composite Canberra/Torrens Rowing Club coxed four at the Australian Rowing Championships. In 1991 he contested and won the national coxless pair championship title with Rob Scott at the 1991 Australian Rowing Championships. He also rowed in an Australian selection coxless four competing for that title in 1991.

McDonald-Crowley first made state representative selection when he was picked in the bow seat of the 1993 New South Wales men's eight to contest the King's Cup at the Interstate Regatta within the Australian Rowing Championships. From 1996 to 1999 he was selected in Australian Capital Territory eights to contest the King's Cup. In 1997 he rowed to a King's Cup victory in an Australian Institute of Sport selection eight who raced as the ACT entrants.

== International representative rowing ==
McDonald-Crowley made his Australian representative debut in 1986 as a junior when with his Canberra Grammar schoolmate Hugh Baird he was selected to race a coxless pair at the 1986 Junior World Rowing Championships in Racice. They finished in sixth place.

In 1990 McDonald-Crowley was selected to an U23 development eight which raced and finished fifth at the World Rowing U23 Championships in Ottensheim and then contested the 1990 World Rowing Championships in Lake Barrington, Tasmania rowing to an overall seventh place. In 1991 McDonald-Crowley and most members of that eight held their seats and contested the 1991 World Rowing Championships in Vienna where they finished overall tenth.

After the poor performance of the Australian eight in 1991, the selectors were keen to select a new crew in the 1992 Olympic year. A thorough selection process was utilised, there were many new faces in the eight and McDonald-Crowley found himself as a reserve for the two selected men's sweep oared boats and racing a coxless pair in Barcelona 1992 with Matthew McArdle. They finished overall thirteenth.

McDonald-Crowley found himself back in Australian representative colours as a sculler at the 1994 World Rowing Championships in Indianapolis. He rowed in a double-scull with the veteran champion Peter Antonie who was contesting his 15th and final World Championships. They rowed to a ninth place. McDonald-Crowley made his final international appearances in 1997 when he rowed at a World Rowing Cup in Paris in the Australian eight to a gold medal. Then at the 1997 World Rowing Championships in Aiguebelette he raced the Australian coxed pair with David Cameron and steered by David Colvin to second place and McDonald-Crowley's sole World Championship medal from his commendable international career - a silver medal.
