= Attila Racz =

Romanian rower

Personal information
- Nationality: Romanian
- Born: 15 June 1973 (age 51)

Sport
- Sport: Rowing

Attila Racz (born 15 June 1973) is a Romanian rower. He competed in the men's coxless pair event at the 1996 Summer Olympics.
