= Henrik Schneider =

Hungarian rower

Personal information
- Nationality: Hungarian
- Born: 5 February 1969 (age 56); Budapest, Hungary

Sport
- Sport: Rowing

Henrik Schneider (born 5 February 1969) is a Hungarian rower. He competed in the men's coxless pair event at the 1992 Summer Olympics.
