= Nikolay Kolev (rower, born 1973) =

Bulgarian rower

Personal information
- Nationality: Bulgarian
- Born: 8 February 1973 (age 52); Plovdiv, Bulgaria

Sport
- Sport: Rowing

Nikolay Kolev (Bulgarian: Николай Колев, born 8 February 1973) is a Bulgarian rower. He competed in the men's coxless pair event at the 1996 Summer Olympics.
