= Andreas Nader =

Austrian rower

Personal information
- Nationality: Austrian
- Born: 31 March 1975 (age 51) Linz, Austria

Sport
- Sport: Rowing

Andreas Nader (born 31 March 1975) is an Austrian rower. He competed in the men's coxless pair event at the 1996 Summer Olympics.
