= Bojan Prešern =

Slovenian rower

Personal information
- Born: 4 August 1962 (age 64) Jesenice, Yugoslavia

Sport
- Sport: Rowing
Medal record
Representing Yugoslavia
Olympic Games
Bronze medal – third place	1988 Seoul	Coxless pair
Summer Universiade
Bronze medal – third place	1987 Zagreb	Eights

Bojan Prešern (born 4 August 1962) is a Slovenian rower who competed for Yugoslavia. He competed in the coxless pairs at the 1988 Summer Olympics.
