= Bartosz Sroga =

Polish rower

Personal information
- Nationality: Polish
- Born: 25 May 1976 (age 48); Gdańsk, Poland

Sport
- Sport: Rowing

Bartosz Sroga (born 25 May 1976) is a Polish rower. He competed in the men's coxed pair event at the 1992 Summer Olympics.
