= Aaron Pollock =

American rower

Personal information
- Full name: Aaron E. Pollock
- Born: December 2, 1967 (age 58) San Francisco, California, United States

Sport
- Sport: Rowing

Aaron E. Pollock (born February 12, 1967) is an American rower. He competed in the men's coxed pair event at the 1992 Summer Olympics. Pollock took up rowing as a freshman at San Diego State University.
