= Alaa El-Din Ahmed =

Egyptian rower (born 1980)

Alaa Ahmed
Personal information
- Full name: Alaa El-Din Ahmed
- Nationality: Egyptian
- Born: 28 August 1980 (age 44); Kalyub, Egypt

Sport
- Sport: Rowing

Alaa El-Din Ahmed (Arabic: عَلَاء الدِّين أَحْمَد; born 28 August 1980) is an Egyptian rower. He competed in the men's coxless pair event at the 2000 Summer Olympics.
