= Claudio Águila =

Argentine rower

Personal information
- Nationality: Argentine
- Born: 29 January 1961 (age 64)

Sport
- Sport: Rowing

Claudio Águila (born 29 January 1961) is an Argentine rower. He competed in the men's coxless pair event at the 1988 Summer Olympics.
