= Jarle Aambø =

Norwegian sports official (born 1960)

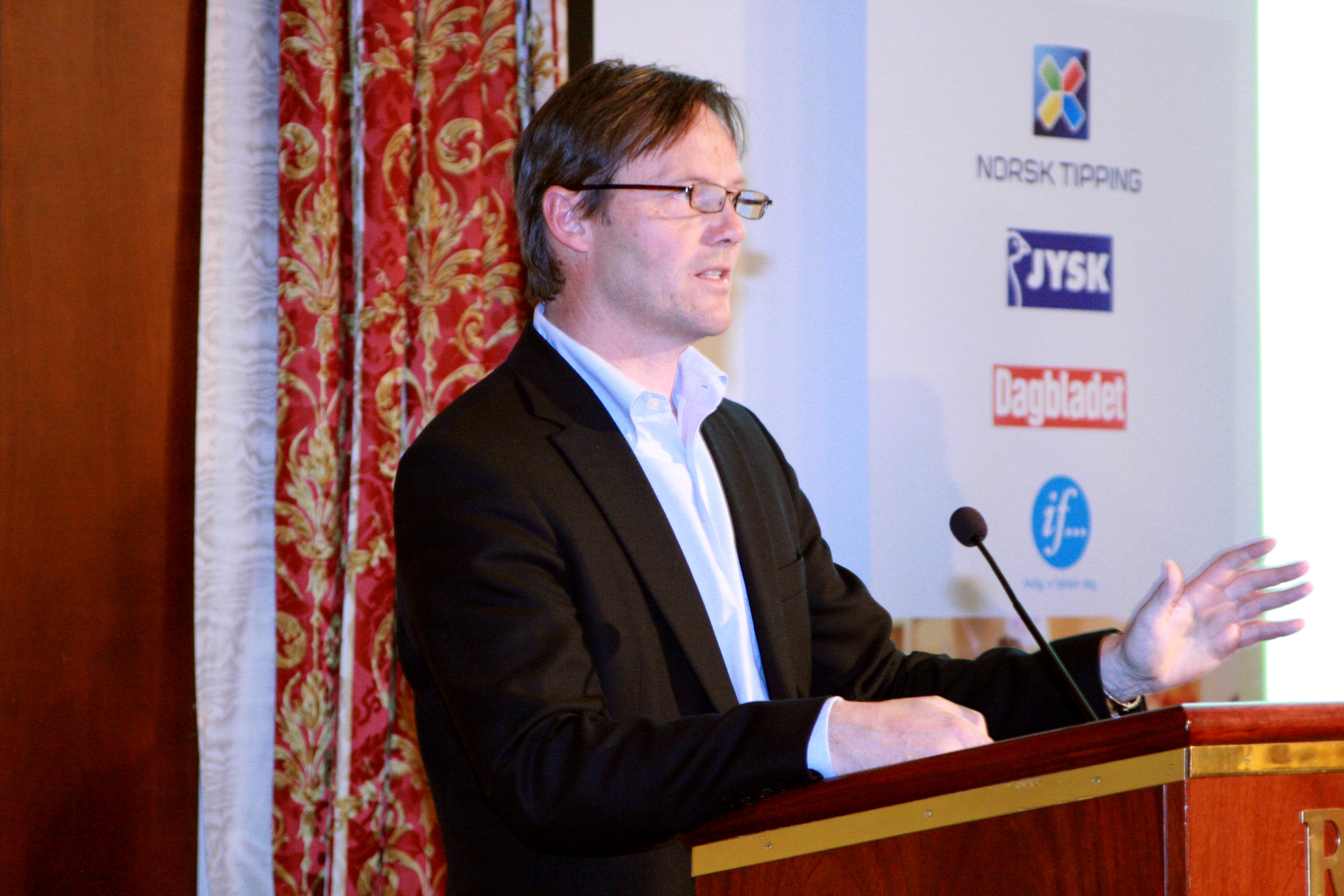
- Born: Jarle Alex Aambø; March 26, 1960 (age 65); Norway

Jarle Alex Aambø (born 26 March 1960) is a Norwegian sports official. In 2013 NRK published the claim by Adresseavisen's sport commentator (Kjetil Kroksæter) that Aambø had been forced to resign as leader of Olympiatoppen.

Since 2004 he is the leader of Olympiatoppen. He has his education from the Norwegian School of Sport Sciences.

He resides in Fjellhamar, Norway.
