= Sebastian Bea =

American rower (born 1977)

Personal information
- Born: April 10, 1977 (age 49) San Francisco, California, U.S.
- Height: 6 ft 6 in (198 cm)
- Weight: 209 lb (95 kg)
Medal record
Men's rowing
Representing the United States
Olympic Games
Silver medal – second place	2000 Sydney	Coxless pair
World Championships
Gold medal – first place	1997 Aiguebelette	Eight
Pan American Games
Gold medal – first place	2007 Rio	Eight
Silver medal – second place	2007 Rio	Coxless four

Sebastian Bea (born April 10, 1977) is an American rower. He won a silver medal in the men's pair at the 2000 Summer Olympics in Sydney, Australia, along with Ted Murphy, and is a 1999 graduate of the University of California, Berkeley.

He is the son of federal judge Carlos Bea.
