= Carlos Palavecino =

Argentine rower

Personal information
- Nationality: Argentine
- Born: 19 February 1975 (age 50)

Sport
- Sport: Rowing

Carlos Palavecino (born 19 February 1975) is an Argentine rower. He competed in the men's coxless pair event at the 1996 Summer Olympics.
