= Ulf Sauerbrey =

German rower

Personal information
- Born: 27 August 1961 (age 64) Halle, Germany
- Height: 1.92 m (6 ft 4 in)
- Weight: 91 kg (201 lb)

Sport
- Sport: Rowing
- Club: Chemie Halle SC
Medal record
Representing East Germany
World Rowing Championships
Silver medal – second place	1982 Lucerne	Coxless pair
Gold medal – first place	1983 Dusiburg	Coxless pair

Ulf Sauerbrey (born 27 August 1961) is a retired German rower who won one gold and one silver medal in the coxless pairs at the world championships of 1982–1983, rowing with Carl Ertel.
