= Amir Temraz =

Egyptian rower

Amr Temraz
Personal information
- Nationality: Egyptian
- Born: 12 August 1977 (age 47)

Sport
- Sport: Rowing

Amr Temraz (Arabic: عمرو تمراز, born 12 August 1977) is an Egyptian rower. He competed in the men's coxless pair event at the 2000 Summer Olympics.
