= Garry Herbert =

British rower

Personal information
- Born: 3 October 1969 (age 56) Lewisham, Greater London, England
Medal record
Men's rowing
Representing Great Britain
Olympic Games
Gold medal – first place	1992 Barcelona	Coxed pair

Garry Gerard Paul Herbert MBE (b. 3 October 1969) is an Olympic gold medal-winning cox. He steered the British coxed pair (brothers Jonny and Greg Searle) to victory in the 1992 Barcelona Olympics (the last time this event was included in the Olympic rowing programme) and the 1993 World Rowing Championships.

His tears of emotion at the medal presentation, with the taller Searle brothers smiling behind him, became an iconic image in Britain.

Born in London, he studied there at Cardinal Vaughan Memorial School, and at the University of Reading, then trained as a barrister. He is now a banker and a commentator for the BBC as well as a motivational speaker. During the 2012 Summer Olympics torch relay, he was chosen to cox the boat carrying Steve Redgrave holding the Torch down the River Thames at Henley.
