= Valery Vyrvich =

Soviet rower

Personal information
- Nationality: Soviet
- Born: 5 March 1967 (age 58)

Sport
- Sport: Rowing

Valery Vyrvich (born 5 March 1967) is a Soviet rower. He competed in the men's coxless pair event at the 1988 Summer Olympics.
