= Jonny Searle =

British rower (born 1969)

Personal information
- Born: 8 May 1969 (age 57) Walton-on-Thames, Surrey, United Kingdom
- Education: Hampton School; Christ Church, Oxford
- Relative: Greg Searle (brother)
Medal record
Men's rowing
Representing Great Britain
Olympic Games
| Gold medal – first place | 1992 Barcelona | Coxed pair |
| Bronze medal – third place | 1996 Atlanta | Coxless four |
World Championships
| Gold medal – first place | 1993 Racice | Coxed pair |
| Silver medal – second place | 1995 Tampere | Coxless four |
| Silver medal – second place | 1999 St. Catharines | Coxed four |
| Bronze medal – third place | 1989 Bled | Eight |
| Bronze medal – third place | 1991 Vienna | Eight |
| Bronze medal – third place | 1994 Indianapolis | Coxless four |
Junior World Championships
| Gold medal – first place | 1987 Cologne | Coxless four |
| Silver medal – second place | 1986 Roudnice | Coxless four |

Jonathan "Jonny" William C. Searle MBE (born 8 May 1969) is a British former Olympic rower and subsequently businessman. Along with his brother Greg and coxswain Garry Herbert, Searle won the gold medal in the coxed pair event at the 1992 Olympic Games in Barcelona.

== Early life and education ==
Searle was born in Walton-on-Thames, Surrey. He was educated at Hampton School and Christ Church, Oxford.

Whilst at Oxford University, he competed in the Boat Race in 1988, 1989, and 1990. Oxford triumphed in all three races. Searle was President of the Oxford University Boat Club in the 1989–1990 academic year.

== Career ==
Searle is an Olympic gold medalist, winning the coxed pairs event at the 1992 Barcelona Olympics with his brother Greg Searle. He also won a World Championships gold medal in 1993. In the 1996 Atlanta Olympics, he finished third in the coxless four event.

He is a steward of Henley Royal Regatta.

== Personal life ==
Searle has two sons, Kit and Jake.

He still trains at Molesey Boat Club and Twickenham Rowing Club.
