= Kazuhiko Kurata =

Japanese rower (born 1967)

Personal information
- Nationality: Japanese
- Born: 8 October 1967 (age 59) Tochigi, Japan

Sport
- Sport: Rowing

Kazuhiko Kurata (蔵田 和彦, Kurata Kazuhiko; born 8 October 1967) is a Japanese rower. He competed in the men's coxless pair event at the 1996 Summer Olympics.
