= Peter Hoeltzenbein =

German rower (born 1971)

Medal record

Men's rowing

Representing Germany

Olympic Games
Silver medal – second place	1992 Barcelona	Coxless pair

World Rowing Championships
Gold medal – first place	1993 Račice	M8+
Silver medal – second place	1994 Indianapolis	M2-

Peter Hoeltzenbein (born 7 April 1971 in Münster) is a German rower.
