= Volkmar Kuttelwascher =

Austrian rower

Personal information
- Nationality: Austrian
- Born: 8 October 1969 (age 55); Linz, Austria

Sport
- Sport: Rowing

Volkmar Kuttelwascher (born 8 October 1969) is an Austrian rower. He competed in the men's coxed pair event at the 1992 Summer Olympics.
