= Igor Zuborenko =

Russian rower (born 1966)

Personal information
- Born: 20 February 1966 (age 59); Mogilev, Byelorussian SSR, Soviet Union
- Height: 198 cm (6 ft 6 in)
- Weight: 91 kg (201 lb)

Sport
- Sport: Rowing

Igor Nikolayevich Zuborenko (born 20 February 1966) is a Russian rower. He competed at the 1988 Summer Olympics in Seoul with the men's coxless pair where they came sixth.
