= John Moore (rower) =

American rower

Personal information
- Full name: John Donelson Moore
- Born: July 31, 1964 (age 61) New York, New York, United States

Sport
- Sport: Rowing

John Moore (born July 31, 1964) is an American rower. He competed in the men's coxed pair event at the 1992 Summer Olympics.
