= Carlos Sobrinho =

Brazilian rower

Personal information
- Nationality: Brazilian
- Born: 8 March 1971 (age 54)

Sport
- Sport: Rowing

Carlos Sobrinho (born 8 March 1971) is a Brazilian rower. He competed in the men's coxed pair event at the 1992 Summer Olympics.
