= Imre Magyar =

Hungarian rower

Personal information
- Nationality: Hungarian
- Born: 5 July 1966 (age 58); Vác, Hungary

Sport
- Sport: Rowing

Imre Magyar (born 5 July 1966) is a Hungarian rower. He competed in the men's coxless pair event at the 1992 Summer Olympics.
