= Peter Sharis =

American rower

Personal information
- Nationality: American
- Born: January 8, 1969 (age 57) Salem, Massachusetts, United States

Sport
- Sport: Rowing

Peter Sharis (born January 8, 1969) is an American former rower. He competed in the men's coxless pair event at the 1992 Summer Olympics. He graduated from Harvard University and Vanderbilt University.
