= Đorđe Višacki =

Serbian rower

Personal information
- Native name: Ђорђе Вишацки
- Born: 2 April 1975 (age 51) Belgrade, SR Serbia, Yugoslavia
Medal record
Men's rowing
Representing Yugoslavia
World Championships
Silver medal – second place	2001 Lucerne	Coxless pair
Bronze medal – third place	1998 Cologne	Coxless pair
Gold medal – first place	1995 Groningen	Coxed four

Đorđe Višacki (Serbian Cyrillic: Ђорђе Вишацки; also transliterated Djordje; born in Belgrade, SR Serbia, Yugoslavia) is a rower from Serbia.

He won two medals at the World Rowing Championships.

He participated at the 2000 Summer Olympics in Sydney and finished 5th in men's coxless pair.

Višacki is Secretary General of the Olympic Committee of Serbia.
