= Marcelo Pieretti =

Argentine rower

Personal information
- Nationality: Argentine
- Born: 27 January 1970 (age 55)

Sport
- Sport: Rowing

Marcelo Pieretti (born 27 January 1970) is an Argentine former rower. He competed in the men's coxed pair event at the 1992 Summer Olympics.
