= Fjellhamar =

- Village
- Location in Akershus
- Coordinates: 59°56′42″N 10°59′08″E
- Country: Norway
- Region: Østlandet
- County: Akershus
- Municipality: Lørenskog
- Time zone: UTC+01:00 (CET)
  - Summer (DST): UTC+02:00 (CEST)

Fjellhamar is a village in Lørenskog, Akershus, Norway, and is located about twenty minutes driving from Oslo. The Fjellhamar school is currently the largest primary school in Norway.

== Famous residents ==
- Jarle Aambø
- Tom Hagen
