= Kodama (surname) =

Kodama (written: 兒玉, 児玉 or 小玉) is a Japanese surname. Notable people with the surname include:

- Akira Kodama (小玉 晃; born 1944), Japanese basketball player
- Arata Kodama (born 1982), Japanese football defender
- Fusako Kodama (born 1945), Japanese photographer
- Kodama Gentarō (1852–1906), Japanese general of the Russo-Japanese War
- Haruka Kodama (born 1996), Japanese idol singer, member of HKT48 and AKB48
- Hideo Kodama (1876–1947), pre-World War II Japanese politician and cabinet minister
- Hideo Kodama (designer) (born 1944), Japanese General Motors Europe automobile designer
- Katsuya Kodama (児玉 克哉; born 1959), Japanese sociologist
- Kazuoki Kodama (born 1965), Japanese Nordic combined skier
- Kenji Kodama (born 1949), Japanese anime director, and storyboard artist best known for directing the anime Case Closed and working with the anime Lupin III
- Kiyoshi Kodama (1934–2011), Japanese actor and TV personality
- Kōtarō Kodama (1934–2026), Japanese politician
- Mari Kodama, international pianist born in Osaka, Japan and raised in Paris
- María Kodama (1937–2023), personal assistant and later wife of Jorge Luis Borges
- Momo Kodama (児玉 桃; born 1972), Japanese classical pianist
- Osamu Kodama (児玉修; born 1956), Japanese alpine skier
- Rieko Kodama (born 1963), video game designer involved with some of Sega's high-profile projects
- Shunto Kodama (児玉 駿斗; born 1999), Japanese footballer
- Takeshi Kodama (児玉 剛始; born 1971), Japanese rower
- Yoshio Kodama (1911–1984), prominent figure in the rise of organized crime in Japan
- Yuichi Kodama, Japanese video director
- Yuki Kodama (小玉 ユキ), Japanese manga artist
