= Emmanuel Bunoz =

French rower

Personal information
- Nationality: French
- Born: 15 May 1970 (age 54)

Sport
- Sport: Rowing

Emmanuel Bunoz (born 15 May 1970) is a French rower. He competed in the men's coxed pair event at the 1992 Summer Olympics.
