= Javier Cano =

Spanish rower

Personal information
- Nationality: Spanish
- Born: 4 March 1973 (age 52)

Sport
- Sport: Rowing

Javier Cano (born 4 March 1973) is a Spanish rower. He competed in the men's coxed pair event at the 1992 Summer Olympics.
