= Ole Andreassen =

Norwegian rower

Personal information
- Nationality: Norwegian
- Born: 5 January 1966 (age 59); Bergen, Norway

Sport
- Sport: Rowing

Ole Andreassen (born 5 January 1966) is a Norwegian rower. He competed in the men's coxless pair event at the 1988 Summer Olympics.
