= Tomasz Mruczkowski =

Polish rower

Personal information
- Nationality: Polish
- Born: 3 June 1966 (age 58); Gdańsk, Poland

Sport
- Sport: Rowing

Tomasz Mruczkowski (born 3 June 1966) is a Polish rower. He competed in the men's coxed pair event at the 1992 Summer Olympics.
