= Dmitriy Plechistik =

Belarusian rower

Personal information
- Nationality: Belarusian
- Born: 26 July 1972 (age 52); Minsk, Belarus

Sport
- Sport: Rowing

Dmitriy Plechistik (born 26 July 1972) is a Belarusian rower. He competed in the men's coxless pair event at the 1996 Summer Olympics.
