= Thomas Studhalter =

Swiss rower

Personal information
- Nationality: Swiss
- Born: 5 January 1969 (age 56); Horw, Switzerland

Sport
- Sport: Rowing

Thomas Studhalter (born 5 January 1969) is a Swiss former rower. He competed in the men's coxless pair event at the 1992 Summer Olympics.
