= Thomas Woddow =

German rower

Personal information
- Nationality: German
- Born: 3 June 1969 (age 56) Schwedt, East Germany

Sport
- Sport: Rowing

Thomas Woddow (born 3 June 1969) is a German rower. He competed in the men's coxed pair event at the 1992 Summer Olympics.
