= Frank Dietrich (rower) =

German rower

Medal record

Men's rowing

Representing West Germany

World Rowing Championships
Gold medal – first place	1989 Bled	M8+
Gold medal – first place	1990 Tasmania	M8+

Frank Dietrich (born 20 September 1965 in Freiburg im Breisgau) is a German rower. Together with Michael Twittmann he finished 7th in the coxless pair at the 1988 Summer Olympics.
