= Maki Kobayashi =

Japanese rower (born 1965)

Personal information
- Nationality: Japanese
- Born: 26 June 1965 (age 59)

Sport
- Sport: Rowing

Maki Kobayashi (小林 眞樹, Kobayashi Maki, born 26 June 1965) is a Japanese rower. He competed in the men's coxless pair event at the 1988 Summer Olympics.
