= Markus Irle =

Austrian rower

Personal information
- Nationality: Austrian
- Born: 5 February 1976 (age 50) Linz, Austria

Sport
- Sport: Rowing

Markus Irle (born 5 February 1976) is an Austrian rower. He competed in the men's coxed pair event at the 1992 Summer Olympics.
