= Valery Belodedov =

Belarusian rower

Personal information
- Nationality: Soviet
- Born: 16 June 1971 (age 53)

Sport
- Sport: Rowing

Valery Belodedov (born 16 June 1971) is a Soviet rower. He competed in the men's coxed pair event at the 1992 Summer Olympics.
