= Gregory Bayne =

South African rower

Personal information
- Nationality: South African
- Born: 10 March 1972 (age 53); Johannesburg, South Africa

Sport
- Sport: Rowing

Gregory Bayne (born 10 March 1972) in Johannesburg, Gauteng, South Africa) is a South African rower who competed in the men's coxless pair event at the 1996 Summer Olympics.
