= Andrés Seperizza =

Argentine rowing cox

Personal information
- Full name: Andrés Seperizza Trabattoni
- Nationality: Argentine
- Born: 6 November 1975 (age 50)

Sport
- Sport: Rowing
Medal record
Representing Argentina
Pan American Games
Silver medal – second place	1991 Havana	Coxed pairs

Andrés Seperizza Trabattoni (born 6 November 1975) is an Argentine former rowing coxswain. He competed in the men's coxed pair event at the 1992 Summer Olympics.
