= Gustavo Pacheco =

Argentine rower

Personal information
- Nationality: Argentine
- Born: 12 May 1965 (age 60)

Sport
- Sport: Rowing

Gustavo Pacheco (born 12 May 1965) is an Argentine rower. He competed in the men's coxed pair event at the 1992 Summer Olympics.
