= John Callie =

South African rower

Personal information
- Nationality: South African
- Born: 1 March 1971 (age 54); Johannesburg, South Africa

Sport
- Sport: Rowing

John Callie (born 1 March 1971) is a South African rower. He competed in the men's coxless pair event at the 1996 Summer Olympics.
