= Luigi Sorrentino (rower) =

Italian rower

Personal information
- Nationality: Italian
- Born: 17 April 1977 (age 47); Naples, Italy

Sport
- Sport: Rowing

Luigi Sorrentino (born 17 April 1977) is an Italian rower. He competed in the men's coxless pair event at the 2000 Summer Olympics.
