= Adam Holland (rower) =

American rower

Personal information
- Full name: Jonathan Adam Holland
- Born: September 14, 1971 (age 55) Philadelphia, Pennsylvania, U.S.

Sport
- Sport: Rowing
Medal record
Representing United States
World Championships
Silver medal – second place	1994 Indianapolis	Coxed fours
Bronze medal – third place	1997 Aiguebelette	Coxless pairs
Summer Universiade
Bronze medal – third place	1993 Buffalo	Coxed fours

Jonathan Adam Holland (born September 14, 1971) is an American rower. He competed in the men's coxless pair event at the 1996 Summer Olympics. He graduated from Harvard University.
