= Michal Dalecký =

Czech rower

Personal information
- Nationality: Czech
- Born: 30 December 1968 (age 56); Prague, Czechoslovakia

Sport
- Sport: Rowing

Michal Dalecký (born 30 December 1968) is a Czech rower. He competed in the men's coxed pair event at the 1992 Summer Olympics.
