= Zigmas Gudauskas =

Lithuanian rower (born 1958)

Personal information
- Nationality: Lithuanian
- Born: 25 February 1958 (age 67)

Sport
- Sport: Rowing

Zigmas Gudauskas (born 25 February 1958) is a Lithuanian rower. He competed in the men's coxless pair event at the 1992 Summer Olympics.
