= Arūnas Visockas =

Lithuanian basketball player (born 1965)

Personal information
- Born: 7 December 1965 (age 60) Kaunas, Lithuanian SSR, Soviet Union
Medal record
Men's basketball
Representing Lithuania
Olympic Games
Bronze medal – third place	1992 Barcelona	Team competition
European Championships
Silver medal – second place	1995 Greece	National team
Representing Soviet Union
European U-18 Championship
Gold medal – first place	1984 Sweden	U-18 Team
Head Coach for Lithuania
FIBA Europe Under-18 Championship
Silver medal – second place	2012 Lithuania	U-18 Team
FIBA Europe Under-16 Championship
Silver medal – second place	2010 Montenegro	U-16 Team

Arūnas Visockas (born 7 December 1965) is a retired Lithuanian basketball player for the Lithuanian national basketball team and Žalgiris Kaunas. He was a power forward 200 cm tall and weighed 108 kg. Visockas is currently the assistant coach of the Lithuanian basketball team BC Kaunas Triobet. His former clubs include BC Zalgiris (1985–1996), Atomeromu Paks (1996–2000) and Statyba Jonava (2000–2001).

== Awards and achievements ==
- Olympic Bronze medalist – 1992
- European championship Silver medalist – 1995
