= Marco Penna =

Italian rower

Marco Penna (born 28 July 1972 in Mantua) is an Italian rower who competed in the Olympics in 1996, 2000, and 2004.
