= Robert Sens =

German rower (born 1977)

Medal record

Men's rowing

Representing Germany

World Rowing Championships
Gold medal – first place	1998 Cologne	M2-
Gold medal – first place	2002 Seville	M4x
Gold medal – first place	2003 Milan	M4x
Bronze medal – third place	2007 Munich	M4x

Robert Sens (born 29 October 1977 in Schwerin) is a German rower. He has won three gold and one bronze at the World Rowing Championships, gold in the M2- at the 1998 World Rowing Championships, gold in the M4x at the 2002 World Rowing Championships, gold in the M4x at the 2003 World Rowing Championships and a bronze in the M4x at the 2007 World Rowing Championships.
