= Daiva Čepelienė =

Lithuanian cyclist (born 1970)

Personal information
- Full name: Daiva Čepelienė
- Born: 27 March 1970 (age 56) Kupiškis, Lithuanian SSR, Soviet Union
- Height: 1.65 m (5 ft 5 in)
- Weight: 56 kg (123 lb)

Cycling career
- Sport: Cycling
- Current team: Retired

Daiva Čepelienė (born 27 March 1970) is a retired female road racing cyclist from Lithuania, who competed at the 1992 Summer Olympics in Barcelona, Spain for her native country. There she finished in 20th place in the women's individual road race.
