= Valdemaras Mačiulskis =

Lithuanian rower (born 1966)

Personal information
- Nationality: Lithuanian
- Born: 19 July 1966 (age 59) Vilnius, Lithuanian SSR, Soviet Union

Sport
- Sport: Rowing

Valdemaras Mačiulskis (born 19 July 1966) is a Lithuanian rower. He competed in the men's coxed pair event at the 1992 Summer Olympics.
