= Oliver Martinov =

Croatian rower (born 1975)

Medal record

Men's rowing

Representing Croatia

World Championships
Silver medal – second place	2001 Lucerne	M8+
Bronze medal – third place	1999 St. Catharines	M2-
Bronze medal – third place	2002 Seville	M4+

Oliver Martinov (born 3 May 1975 in Zadar) is a retired Croatian rower.
