= Nerijus Beiga =

Lithuanian swimmer (born 1972)

Personal information
- Born: 4 March 1972 (age 54) Kaunas, Lithuanian SSR, Soviet Union

Sport
- Sport: Swimming

Nerijus Beiga (born 4 March 1972) is a Lithuanian breaststroke swimmer. He competed at the 1992 Summer Olympics and the 1996 Summer Olympics.

During spring break in 2024, Beiga's fifteen year-old son, Aleksas, died in an avalanche at a ski resort in the Swiss Alps.
