= Pasquale Panzarino =

Italian rower

Personal information
- Nationality: Italian
- Born: 9 July 1972 (age 52); Bari, Italy

Sport
- Sport: Rowing

Pasquale Panzarino (born 9 July 1972) is an Italian rower. He competed in the men's coxless pair event at the 2000 Summer Olympics.
