= Patrick Berthou =

French rower

Personal information
- Nationality: French
- Born: 17 June 1963 (age 61); Pont-à-Mousson, France

Sport
- Sport: Rowing

Patrick Berthou (born 17 June 1963) is a French rower. He finished in sixth place in the men's coxed pair event at the 1992 Summer Olympics.
