= Takeshi Kodama =

Japanese rower (born 1971)

Personal information
- Nationality: Japanese
- Born: 10 December 1971 (age 53); Shizuoka, Japan

Sport
- Sport: Rowing

Takeshi Kodama (児玉 剛始, Kodama Takeshi, born 10 December 1971) is a Japanese rower. He competed in the men's coxless pair event at the 1996 Summer Olympics.
