= Audun Hadler-Olsen =

Norwegian rower

Personal information
- Nationality: Norwegian
- Born: 6 January 1969 (age 56); Bergen, Norway

Sport
- Sport: Rowing

Audun Hadler-Olsen (born 6 January 1969) is a Norwegian rower. He competed in the men's coxless pair event at the 1988 Summer Olympics.
