= Toppidrettssenteret =

Sports training center in Oslo, Norway

Coordinates: 59.9683°N 10.7321°E

Toppidrettssenteret (English: The Elite Sports Centre) is the training center of the Olympiatoppen, the elite branch of the Norwegian Olympic and Paralympic Committee and Confederation of Sports.

It is located between the Norwegian School of Sport Sciences and the recreational area Sognsvann.

The main building consists mainly of training rooms. Outside there are an association football pitch with artificial turf, an all-weather running track, an athletics throwing field, a bandy field, a basketball court, and facilities for skating and lugeing. There is also a medical facility as well as a hotel.
