= Yumiko Suzuki (cyclist) =

Japanese cyclist

Personal information
- Born: 6 August 1960 (age 66) Akita, Japan

Cycling career
- Sport: Cycling

Yumiko Suzuki (鈴木 裕美子, Suzuki Yumiko; born 6 August 1960) is a Japanese former cyclist. She competed in the women's individual road race at the 1992 Summer Olympics. She won the Tokyo Women's Criterium in 1998.
