= David Weightman (footballer) =

English footballer

Personal information
- Date of birth: 14/07/1890
- Place of birth: Coatbridge, Scotland
- Date of death: 1967
- Place of death: Sheerness, Kent
- Position: Centre forward

Senior career*
Years	Team	Apps	(Gls)
1909–1912	Burnley	4	(0)
1913-14	Barrow		
1914-15	Gillingham	23	(7)

Managerial career
- 1927-1957: Sheppey United
- * Club domestic league appearances and goals

David Weightman was a Scottish professional footballer who played as a centre forward. He played three matches in the Football League for Burnley.
