= Christoph Küffer =

Swiss rower

Personal information
- Nationality: Swiss
- Born: 8 April 1968 (age 58) Obersteckholz, Switzerland

Sport
- Sport: Rowing

Christoph Küffer (born 8 April 1968) is a Swiss rower. He competed in the men's coxless pair event at the 1992 Summer Olympics.
