= Snorre Lorgen =

Norwegian rower

Personal information
- Nationality: Norwegian
- Born: 23 September 1969 (age 55)

Sport
- Sport: Rowing

Snorre Lorgen (born 23 September 1969) is a Norwegian rower. He competed in the men's coxless pair event at the 1992 Summer Olympics. He graduated from Harvard University.
