= Alfred Lindroos =

Finnish politician

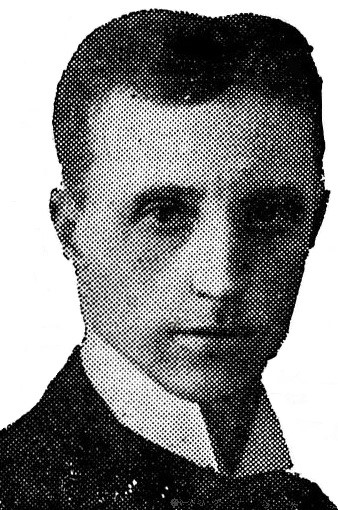
Alfred Lindroos

Gustaf Alfred Lindroos (10 June 1883 – 3 July 1937) was a Finnish metalworker, civil servant and politician. He was a member of the Parliament of Finland from 1921 to 1922, representing the Social Democratic Party of Finland (SDP). He was born in Perniö.
