= Kari Lindroos =

Finnish rower

Personal information
- Nationality: Finnish
- Born: 22 March 1962 (age 63); Ekenäs, Finland

Sport
- Sport: Rowing

Kari Lindroos (born 22 March 1962) is a Finnish rower. He competed in the men's coxless pair event at the 1988 Summer Olympics.
