= Rikard Lindroos =

Finnish footballer (born 1985)

Personal information
- Date of birth: 12 July 1985 (age 41)
- Place of birth: Vasa, Finland
- Height: 1.84 m (6 ft 1/2 in)
- Position: Midfielder

Team information
- Current team: Vaasan Palloseura
- Number: 20

Youth career
- VIFK

Senior career*
Years	Team	Apps	(Gls)
2009–	Vaasan Palloseura	16	(2)
- * Club domestic league appearances and goals as of 14 October 2009

Rikard Lindroos (born 12 July 1985) is a Finnish footballer who represents Vaasan Palloseura of Veikkausliiga. Came from VIFK to the beginning of the 2009 season.
