= Colin von Ettingshausen =

German rower

Medal record

Men's rowing

Representing Germany

Olympic Games
Silver medal – second place	1992 Barcelona	Coxless pair

World Rowing Championships
Gold medal – first place	1993 Račice	M8+

Colin von Ettingshausen (born 11 August 1971, in Düsseldorf) is a German rower. Von Ettingshausen studied at Keble College, Oxford.
