= Alain Lewuillon =

Belgian rower

Personal information
- Nationality: Belgian
- Born: 27 February 1953 (age 72); Ixelles, Belgium

Sport
- Sport: Rowing

Alain Lewuillon (born 27 February 1953) is a Belgian former rower. He competed at the 1988 Summer Olympics and the 1992 Summer Olympics.
