= Ričardas Bukys =

Lithuanian rower (born 1967)

Personal information
- Nationality: Lithuanian
- Born: 5 September 1967 (age 58)

Sport
- Sport: Rowing

Ričardas Bukys (born 5 September 1967) is a Lithuanian rower. He competed in the men's coxless pair event at the 1992 Summer Olympics.
