= Kurt Bausback =

American rower (born 1960)

Personal information
- Born: May 26, 1960 (age 66) San Diego, California, United States

Sport
- Sport: Rowing

Kurt Bausback (born May 26, 1960) is an American rower. He competed in the men's coxless pair event at the 1988 Summer Olympics.
