= Dumitru Răducanu =

Romanian rower

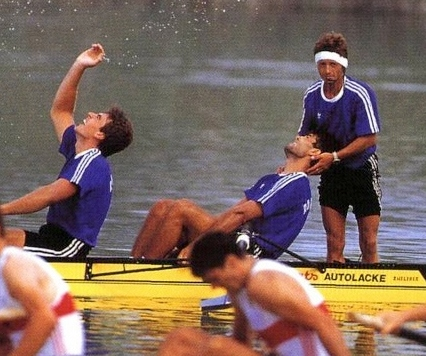
- Răducanu (right) at the 1992 Olympics

Personal information
- Born: 19 July 1967 (age 58) Bucharest, Romania
- Height: 165 cm (5 ft 5 in)
- Weight: 55 kg (121 lb)

Sport
- Sport: Rowing
- Club: Steaua Bucharest; Petromar Constanta
Medal record
Representing Romania
Olympic Games
Silver medal – second place	1984 Los Angeles	Coxed pair
Gold medal – first place	1992 Barcelona	Coxed four
Bronze medal – third place	1992 Barcelona	Coxed pair
World Rowing Championships
Silver medal – second place	1985 Hazewinkel	Coxed pair
Silver medal – second place	1991 Vienna	Coxed four
Gold medal – first place	1996 Strathclyde	Coxed four
Silver medal – second place	1996 Strathclyde	Coxed pair
Bronze medal – third place	1998 Cologne	Eight
Bronze medal – third place	1999 St. Catharines	Coxed four

Dumitru Răducanu (born 19 July 1967) is a retired Romanian rowing coxswain. He competed at the 1984, 1992 and 2000 Olympics and won a gold, a silver and a bronze medal. At the world championships he won one gold, three silver and two bronze medals between 1985 and 1999. Răducanu took up rowing in 1982, and after retiring from competitions in 2000 worked as a rowing coach.
