= Sverke Lorgen =

Norwegian rower

Personal information
- Nationality: Norwegian
- Born: 20 July 1973 (age 51)

Sport
- Sport: Rowing

Sverke Lorgen (born 20 July 1973) is a Norwegian rower. He competed in the men's coxless pair event at the 1992 Summer Olympics. He graduated from Harvard University.
