= Jean-Christophe Rolland =

French rower (born 1968)

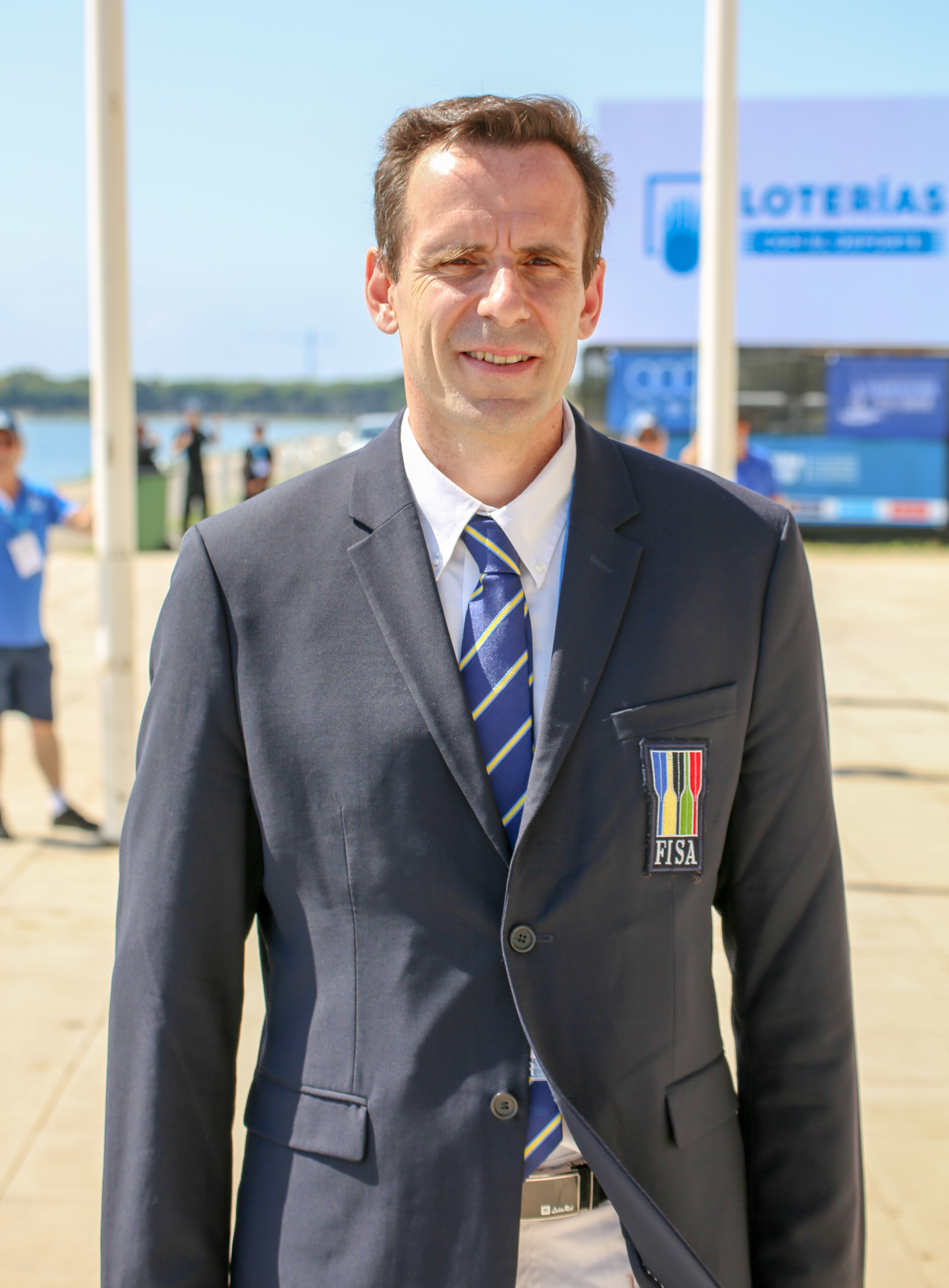
- Rolland in 2018

Personal information
- Born: 3 July 1968 (age 57) Condrieu

Sport
- Sport: Rowing
Medal record
Men's rowing
Representing France
Olympic Games
Gold medal – first place	2000 Sydney	Coxless pair
Bronze medal – third place	1996 Atlanta	Coxless pair
World Championships
Gold medal – first place	1993 Račice	Coxless four
Gold medal – first place	1997 Aiguebelette	Coxless pair
Silver medal – second place	1994 Indianapolis	Coxless four
Silver medal – second place	1999 St. Catharines	Coxless pair
Bronze medal – third place	1995 Tampere	Coxless pair

Jean-Christophe Rolland (born 3 July 1968, in Condrieu) is a French competition rower and Olympic champion. Rolland won a gold medal in coxless pair at the 2000 Summer Olympics.

He succeeded Denis Oswald as President of FISA, the International Rowing Federation, in a ceremony held at Lucerne, Switzerland, in July 2014. He was elected as a member of the International Olympic Committee in 2017.
