= Carl Ertel =

German rower

Personal information
- Born: 15 October 1959 (age 66) Gera, Bezirk Gera, East Germany
- Height: 1.94 m (6 ft 4 in)
- Weight: 90 kg (198 lb)

Sport
- Sport: Rowing
- Club: SV Halle
Medal record
Representing East Germany
World Rowing Championships
| Silver medal – second place | 1982 Lucerne | Coxless pair |
| Gold medal – first place | 1983 Dusiburg | Coxless pair |

Carl Ertel (born 15 October 1959) is a retired German rower who won one gold and one silver medal in the coxless pairs at the world championships of 1982–1983, rowing with Ulf Sauerbrey. He finished fifth in this event at the 1988 Summer Olympics, together with Uwe Gasch. His former wife, Carmela Schmidt, is a retired Olympic swimmer.
