= Rob Scott (businessman) =

Australian businessman and former rower

Robert Scott
Personal information
- Born: Robert Geoffrey Scott; 5 August 1969 (age 57) Perth, Western Australia, Australia
- Education: Rossmoyne Senior High School; Australian National University; Macquarie University
- Occupation: Chief Executive
- Employer: Wesfarmers Ltd
- Height: 194 cm (6 ft 4 in)
- Weight: 93 kg (205 lb)
- Spouse: Liz Weekes

Sport
- Sport: Rowing
- Club: Swan River Rowing Club; Curtin University Rowing Club
Medal record
Men's rowing
Representing Australia
Olympic Games
Silver medal – second place	1996 Atlanta	Coxless pair

Robert Geoffrey Scott (born 5 August 1969) is an Australian businessman and former national champion and national representative rower. Since 2017 he has been Managing Director and Chief Executive of Wesfarmers, the Perth-headquartered publicly listed industrial and retail conglomerate, which in 2016 was Australia's largest company by revenue and Australia's largest employer. As a sweep-oared heavyweight rower Scott was a national champion, an eight-time crewman in West Australian King's Cup eights and a four-time Australian representative at World Rowing Championships. He is a dual Olympian oarsman who won a silver medal in a coxless pair at the 1996 Atlanta Olympics.

== Early life and education ==
Scott was born in Perth, Western Australia in 1969. His parents were teachers and he spent time in Kalgoorlie and Dumbleyung before completing his schooling at the public co-educational high school Rossmoyne Senior High School in Perth where he was introduced to rowing.

He commenced tertiary studies at the University of Western Australia and after accepting a rowing scholarship to the Australian Institute of Sport completed his Bachelor of Commerce at the Australian National University in Canberra. He holds a Master of Applied Finance degree from Macquarie University and has a Graduate Diploma in Applied Finance and Investments. He is a qualified chartered accountant, and has attended a six-week Advanced Management Program at Harvard Business School.

== Rowing career ==
=== Club and state rowing ===
Scott's senior club rowing was initially from the Swan River Rowing Club in Perth and later from the Curtin University Boat Club. When living in Sydney in the late 1990s, he was a member of Mosman Rowing Club.

His first state representative selection came in the Western Australian youth eight selected to compete for the Noel Wilkinson Trophy at the 1988 Interstate Regatta within the Australian Rowing Championships. He stroked that crew. In 1989 Scott was selected in the West Australian senior men's eight to compete at the Interstate Regatta for the King's Cup. He rowed again in West Australian King's Cup eights in 1990, 1993, 1994, 1995, 1996, 1999 and 2000. He stroked those WA eights in 1993, 1994 and 1996.

Scott contested national championship titles at the Australian Rowing Championships on a number of occasions. In 1996 in Curtin University colours he won the national coxless pair title (the Ted Bromley Memorial Trophy) with David Weightman and at stroke he won the 1996 national coxless four title in a composite selection crew.

=== International representative rowing ===
Scott's first Australian representative appearance was in the 1989 Trans Tasman U23 series. He stroked one of the two Australian eights selected for the series of three match races against New Zealand. They won one match race and were twice beaten by the other Australian crew. In 1990 at the Nations Cup in Linz, Austria – the equivalent at that time of the World Rowing U23 Championships – Scott rowed in the seven seat of the Australian eight which achieved an overall fifth placing.

In 1990 Scott was elevated to the Australian men's eight and he raced in that crew at the 1990 World Rowing Championships in Lake Barrington, Tasmania to a seventh-place ranking. All of Scott's national representative appearances for the next few years would be in the Australian eight. Scott rowed in the eight at the 1991 World Rowing Championships in Vienna where the boat finished tenth. He was one of only two members of that crew to hold their seats coming into the 1992 Olympic year. The eight was full of fresh faces and to comply with AOC guidelines needed additional international experience and results to justify selection. Accordingly, the men's eight had to gain international results at the Lucerne regatta pre-Olympics to be included in the team. The crew qualified and in Barcelona 1992 Rob Scott stroked the eight to the Olympic final and a fifth-place finish.

Scott carried on rowing at the highest level post Barcelona. He stroked the Australian eight to a fourth placing at the 1993 World Championships in Racice. Two years later at the 1995 World Championships in Tampere, Scott was again in the stroke seat for the Australian eight's eleventh-place finish.

In 1995 the New South Wales pair of Robert Walker and Richard Wearne had won World Championship silver in the coxless pair and were aiming for Olympic gold in 1996. However Scott and Queenslander David Weightman won the national title that year and were chosen by selectors to row the coxless pair at the 1996 Atlanta Olympics. Scott and Weightman believed they had a real chance of gold and threw everything at their opponents in the final 500 m of a thrilling final. They had to be content with second place and a silver medal behind the British pair of Steve Redgrave and Matthew Pinsent.

1996 saw Scott awarded as the Western Australian Sports Star of the Year for his 1996 achievements in rowing. Aside from the Olympic silver that year, he had won gold and silver at international regattas in Cologne and Duisburg, gold in the pre-Olympic trials in Lucerne and had won two Australian national titles (the open coxless pair and open coxless four – both at stroke) at the 1996 Australian Rowing Championships.

Weightman and Scott paired up again toward the end of the next Olympiad in a late campaign for Sydney 2000. They both regained seats in their state eights at the national level in 1999 and 2000 and as Australian representatives they raced a coxless pair at two World Rowing Cups in Europe in 1999 and again in 2000. They placed third in the first outing but finished sixth in those other regattas. The gun Australian pair at that time were James Tomkins and Drew Ginn and although Ginn suffered a back injury at the first 2000 World Rowing Cup event, he was replaced by Matthew Long. Weightman and Scott weren't picked to the Australian squad for the 1999 World Championships and ultimately did not qualify for Sydney 2000.

== Professional career ==
Scott commenced his career at Wesfarmers in 1993 and they supported his rowing aspirations. In the mid 1990s Scott moved into investment banking and worked for nearly a decade in Sydney and Hong Kong for Deutsche Bank.

In 2004 he rejoined Wesfarmers and progressed through a number of senior executive roles. He was General Manager, Business Projects; CEO of Wesfarmers Insurance (from 2007); Finance Director of Coles Supermarkets (from 2013); Managing Director, Financial Services (from 2014); then the Managing Director of the Wesfarmers Industrials Division (from August 2015).

His appointment as Managing Director and CEO of Wesfarmers in November 2017 saw him replace Richard Goyder and become the eighth Chief Executive in Wesfarmers' 103-year history. At the time of his appointment Wesfarmers was Australia's ninth-largest listed company by market capitalisation.

In other leadership roles, Scott was appointed Chairman of Rowing Australia in 2014 and a director of the University of Western Australia Business School Advisory Board. He is a director of Gresham Partners Holdings Limited (a financial advisory business half-owned by Wesfarmers) and is a past president and director of the Insurance Council of Australia.

== Personal ==
Scott is married to Australian Olympic gold-medal winning water polo player Liz Weekes. They have two children.
