= Gregor Sračnjek =

Slovenian rower

Personal information
- Nationality: Slovenian
- Born: 6 May 1979 (age 45); Kranj, Yugoslavia

Sport
- Sport: Rowing

Gregor Sračnjek (born 6 May 1979) is a Slovenian rower. He competed at the 2000 Summer Olympics and the 2004 Summer Olympics.
