= Michael Twittmann =

German rower (born 1965)

Personal information
- Nationality: German
- Born: 23 June 1965 (age 60) Kamen, Germany

Sport
- Sport: Rowing

Michael Twittmann (born 23 June 1965) is a German rower. He competed in the men's coxless pair event at the 1988 Summer Olympics.
