= Michel Andrieux =

French rower (born 1967)

Medal record

Men's rowing

Representing France

Olympic Games
Gold medal – first place	2000 Sydney	Coxless pair
Bronze medal – third place	1996 Atlanta	Coxless pair

Michel Andrieux (French pronunciation: [miʃɛl ɑ̃dʁijø]; born 28 April 1967) is a French competition rower and Olympic champion.

Andrieux won a gold medal in coxless pairs at the 2000 Summer Olympics.
