= David Weightman (rower) =

Australian rower

Medal record

Men's rowing

Representing Australia

Olympic Games
Silver medal – second place	1996 Atlanta	Coxless pair

Commonwealth Rowing Championships
Gold medal – first place	1994 Ontario	Coxed four

David J. Weightman (born 28 September 1971, in Brisbane) is an Australian former rower. He was a national champion and representative at World Rowing Championships, an Olympian and an Olympic silver medallist.

== Club and state rowing ==
Weightman grew up in Brisbane and attended Brisbane Grammar School where he learnt to row in 1984. His senior rowing was with the University of Queensland Boat Club in Brisbane and the Mosman Rowing Club in Sydney. Weightman was a scholarship holder at the Australian Institute of Sport from 1993 to 1996 and was based in Canberra.

Weightman first made state selection for Queensland in the 1990 youth eight contesting the Noel Wilkinson Trophy at the Interstate Regatta within the Australian Rowing Championships. In 1991 he was selected to the Queensland senior men's eight to compete for the King's Cup at the Interstate Regatta. He made further King's Cup crews for Queensland in 1994, 1996, 1997, 1998, 1999 and 2000.

Weightman contested national championship titles at the Australian Rowing Championships on a number of occasions. In UQBC colours in 1996 he won the national coxless pair title (the Ted Bromley Memorial Trophy) with Rob Scott. In 2000 wearing Mosman Rowing Club colours he again won that Australian championship title.

== International representative rowing ==
Weightman made his international debut in 1989 at the Junior World Rowing Championships in Hungary where he took fourth place in the Australian junior coxed four.

In the Australian men's eight he competed at World Rowing Championships in Vienna 1991 (to a tenth placing) and Tampere 1995 (to eleventh place). He rowed in the Australian men's coxed four at the World Championships in Racice 1993 and Indianapolis 1994 both times to a fifth placing.

In 1996 he was selected to contest the 1996 Atlanta Olympics with Rob Scott in the Australian men's coxless pair. The pair believed they had a real chance of gold and threw everything at their opponents in the final 500m of a thrilling race but had to be content with second place and a silver medal behind the champion British pair of Steve Redgrave and Matthew Pinsent.

Weightman and Scott paired up again toward the end of the next Olympiad in a campaign for Sydney 2000. They raced as a coxless pair at two World Rowing Cups in Europe in 1999 and again in 2000. They placed third in the first outing but finished sixth in those other regattas. They weren't picked to the Australian squad for the 1999 World Championships and ultimately did not qualify for Sydney 2000.
