= Olympiatoppen =

Norwegian sports training organisation

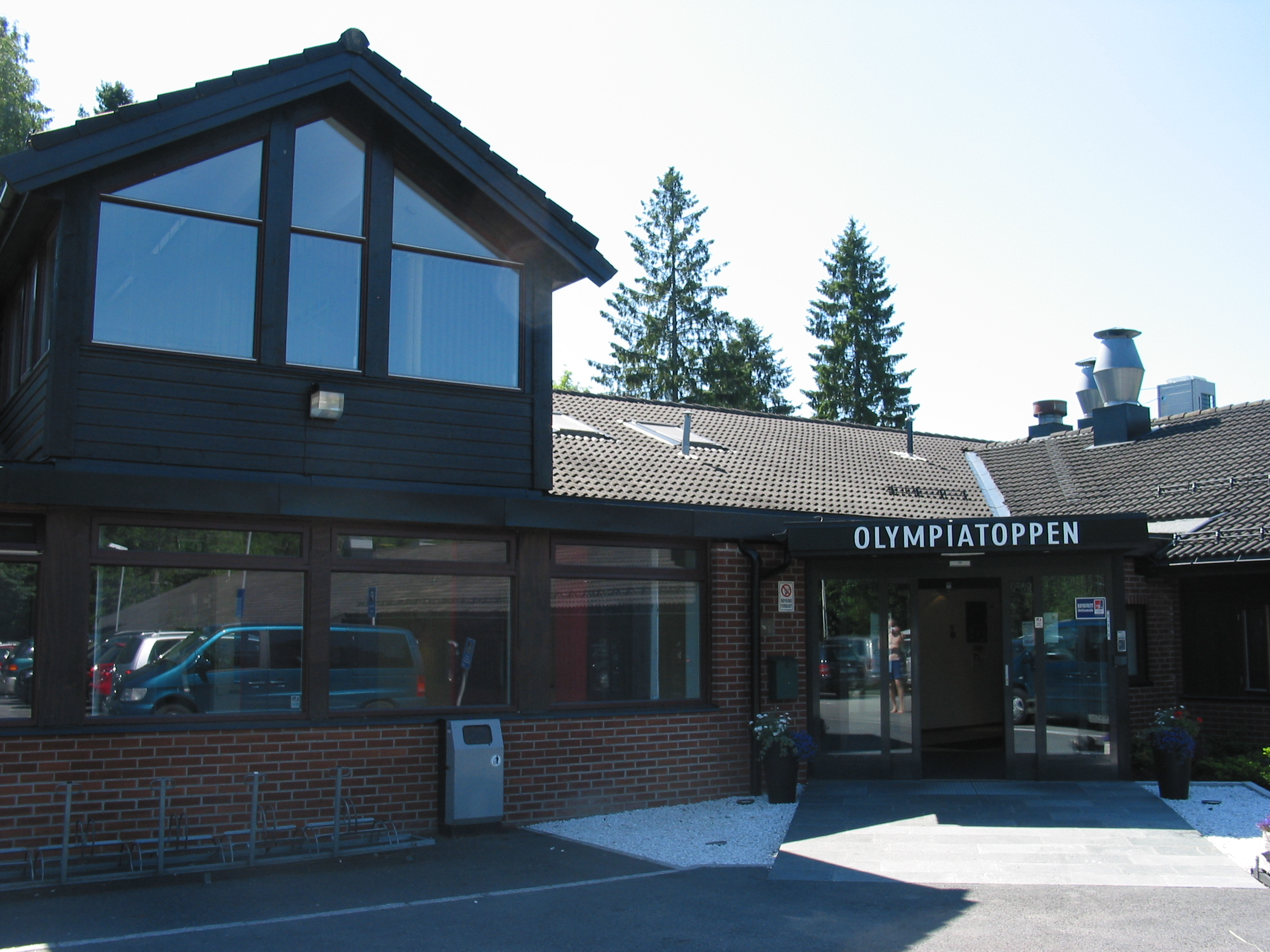
Headquarters.

Olympiatoppen is an organisation that is part of Norwegian Olympic and Paralympic Committee and Confederation of Sports with responsibility for training Norwegian elite sport. Olympiatoppen is based at the Toppidrettssenteret between Norwegian School of Sport Sciences and Sognsvann. The leader of Olympiatoppen is Tore Øvrebø.

Central is the idea of coaches for priority sports. These coaches are Johan Kaggestad for strength sports, together with Atle Kvålsvoll and Roger Gjedsvik, Michael Jørgensen for technical sports, and Marit Breivik and Torgeir Bryn for team sports. The coaches follow up the ports attend team activities, events and take a role in the optimising of opportunities to lead. The national team coaches work together with Olympiatoppen's coaches.

Different sports have benefitted in different ways from working with the organisation, and it gives practical help to the Norwegian team in Olympic sports.

Olympiatoppen also has its own clinic and training facilities. This has an area where Norway's top athletes can be trained and help to develop new sporting technology.
