= Michael Peterson (rower) =

American rower

Personal information
- Born: January 4, 1967 (age 59) Gulph Mills, Pennsylvania, U.S.
Medal record
Men's rowing
Representing United States
World Rowing Championships
Bronze medal – third place	1993 Račice	M8+
Bronze medal – third place	1995 Tampere	M8+

Michael Peterson (born January 4, 1967, in Gulph Mills, Pennsylvania) is an American rower. He competed in the 1996 Olympic Games in Atlanta, Georgia, US.
