= Kai Compagner =

Dutch rower

Personal information
- Nationality: Dutch
- Born: 17 July 1969 (age 55); Delft, Netherlands

Sport
- Sport: Rowing

Kai Compagner (born 17 July 1969) is a Dutch rower. He competed at the 1992 Summer Olympics and the 1996 Summer Olympics.
