= Henry Hering (rower) =

Canadian rower (born 1968)

Personal information
- Born: 28 January 1968 (age 58) Pointe-Claire, Quebec, Canada

Sport
- Sport: Rowing
Medal record
Representing Canada
Pan American Games
Silver medal – second place	1995 Mar del Plata	Coxed fours
Silver medal – second place	1995 Mar del Plata	Eights
Bronze medal – third place	1995 Mar del Plata	Double sculls

Henry Hering (born 28 January 1968) is a Canadian rower, father of Nikola Hering, a prominent mountain biker. He competed at the 1992 Summer Olympics, 1996 Summer Olympics and the 2000 Summer Olympics.
