= Laurent Lacasa =

French rower

Personal information
- Nationality: French
- Born: 28 September 1964 (age 60)

Sport
- Sport: Rowing

Laurent Lacasa (born 28 September 1964) is a French rower. He competed at the 1988 Summer Olympics and the 1992 Summer Olympics.
