= Piotr Basta =

Polish rower

Personal information
- Nationality: Polish
- Born: 16 September 1970 (age 56) Krosno Odrzańskie, Poland

Sport
- Sport: Rowing

Piotr Basta (born 16 September 1970) is a Polish rower. He competed at the 1992 Summer Olympics, 1996 Summer Olympics and the 2000 Summer Olympics.
