= Luc Goiris =

Belgian rower

Personal information
- Nationality: Belgian
- Born: 8 March 1968 (age 57); Bornem, Belgium

Sport
- Sport: Rowing

Luc Goiris (born 8 March 1968) is a Belgian former rower. He competed at the 1992 Summer Olympics, 1996 Summer Olympics and the 2000 Summer Olympics.
