= Aarne Lindroos =

Finnish rower

Personal information
- Nationality: Finnish
- Born: 14 December 1960 (age 64); Helsinki, Finland

Sport
- Sport: Rowing

Aarne Lindroos (born 14 December 1960) is a Finnish rower. He competed at the 1984 Summer Olympics and the 1988 Summer Olympics.
