= Sjors van Iwaarden =

Dutch rower

Medal record

Men's rowing

Representing the Netherlands

World Rowing Championships
Silver medal – second place	1994 Indianapolis	M8+

George Gerardus "Sjors" van Iwaarden (born 22 February 1969 in Amsterdam) is a Dutch rower. He competed as a member of the Netherlands men's coxless pair teams which finished in 8th place at the 1992 Summer Olympics and 17th place at the 1996 Summer Olympics.

== See also ==
- Netherlands at the 1992 Summer Olympics § Rowing
- Netherlands at the 1996 Summer Olympics § Rowing
