= Uwe Gasch =

German rower

Personal information
- Born: 12 June 1961 (age 65) Leipzig, Bezirk Leipzig, East Germany
- Height: 190 cm (6 ft 3 in)
- Weight: 89 kg (196 lb)

Sport
- Sport: Rowing
- Club: SC DHfK, Leipzig
Medal record
Representing East Germany
World Rowing Championships
Bronze medal – third place	1981 Munich	Coxless four
Silver medal – second place	1983 Dusiburg	Eight
Bronze medal – third place	1985 Hazewinkel	Coxed pair

Uwe Gasch (born 12 June 1961) is a retired German rower who won one silver and two bronze medals at the world championships of 1981–1985. He finished in fifth place in the coxless pair boat class at the 1988 Summer Olympics, rowing with Carl Ertel. His ex-wife, Marita Sandig, was also an Olympian rower.
