= Ibon Urbieta =

Spanish rower

Personal information
- Nationality: Spanish
- Born: 30 April 1967 (age 57); Orio, Basque Country, Spain

Sport
- Sport: Rowing

Ibon Urbieta Zubiria (born 30 April 1967) is a Spanish rower. He competed at the 1988 Summer Olympics and the 1992 Summer Olympics.
