= Jaak Van Driessche =

Belgian rower

Personal information
- Nationality: Belgian
- Born: 3 July 1969 (age 55); Ghent, Belgium

Sport
- Sport: Rowing

Jaak Van Driessche (born 3 July 1969) is a Belgian rower. He competed at the 1992 Summer Olympics and the 1996 Summer Olympics.
