= Einius Petkus =

Lithuanian rower (born 1970)

Personal information
- Nationality: Lithuanian
- Born: 29 May 1970 (age 55) Vilnius, Lithuanian SSR, Soviet Union

Sport
- Sport: Rowing

Einius Petkus (born 29 May 1970) is a Lithuanian rower. He competed at the 1992 Summer Olympics and the 1996 Summer Olympics.
