= Juozas Bagdonas (rower) =

Lithuanian rower (born 1968)

Personal information
- Nationality: Lithuanian
- Born: 21 June 1968 (age 56); Telšiai, Lithuanian SSR, Soviet Union

Sport
- Sport: Rowing

Juozas Bagdonas (born 21 June 1968) is a Lithuanian rower. He competed at the 1992 Summer Olympics and the 1996 Summer Olympics.
