= Hermann Bauer (rower) =

Austrian rower

Personal information
- Nationality: Austrian
- Born: 23 March 1966 (age 59); Linz, Austria

Sport
- Sport: Rowing

Hermann Bauer (born 23 May 1966) is an Austrian rower. He competed at the 1988 Summer Olympics, 1992 Summer Olympics and the 1996 Summer Olympics.
