= Rowing at the 1984 Summer Olympics =

Rowing at the Games of the XXIII Olympiad
- Venue: Lake Casitas
- Date: 30 July – 5 August 1984
- Competitors: 447 (286 men, 161 women) from 38 nations

Rowing at the 1984 Summer Olympics in Los Angeles, California, United States featured 14 events in total, for both men and women. Events were held at Lake Casitas.

Due to the Eastern Bloc boycott of these Olympics, some of the strongest rowing nations like East Germany, the USSR or Bulgaria were not present. However, this boycott gave an opportunity to Romania, which was one of the few eastern European countries to come to the Games, going on to dominate in women's sports, winning 5 gold medals in 6 events. Both Canada (gold) and USA (silver) had beaten the reigning (boycotting) two-time Olympic champions from East Germany in the men's 8 twice at the Lucerne pre-olympic regatta.

Steve Redgrave won his first of five consecutive gold medals. Elisabeta Oleniuc, later known as Elisabeta Lipă, also won her first gold medal. Twenty years later she won her fifth gold medal in the 2004 Summer Olympics in Athens.

The quadruple sculls events, as in its debut year 1976 and 1980, were held without coxswain for men and with coxswain for women.

== Medal summary ==
=== Men's events ===
| Games | Gold | Silver | Bronze |
|---|---|---|---|
| Single sculls | Pertti Karppinen; Finland | Peter-Michael Kolbe; West Germany | Robert Mills; Canada |
| Double sculls | Brad Alan Lewis and Paul Enquist; United States | Pierre-Marie Deloof and Dirk Crois; Belgium | Zoran Pančić and Milorad Stanulov; Yugoslavia |
| Quadruple sculls (coxless) | West Germany; Albert Hedderich; Raimund Hörmann; Dieter Wiedenmann; Michael Dürsch | Australia; Paul Reedy; Gary Gullock; Timothy McLaren; Anthony Lovrich | Canada; Doug Hamilton; Mike Hughes; Phil Monckton; Bruce Ford |
| Coxed pairs | Italy; Carmine Abbagnale; Giuseppe Abbagnale; Giuseppe Di Capua (cox) | Romania; Dimitrie Popescu; Vasile Tomoiagă; Dumitru Răducanu (cox) | United States; Kevin Still; Robert Espeseth; Doug Herland (cox) |
| Coxless pairs | Petru Iosub and Valer Toma; Romania | Fernando Climent and Luis María Lasúrtegui; Spain | Hans Magnus Grepperud and Sverre Løken; Norway |
| Coxed four | Great Britain; Richard Budgett; Martin Cross; Adrian Ellison (cox); Andy Holmes; Steve Redgrave | United States; Edward Ives; Thomas Kiefer; Michael Bach; Gregory Springer; John Stillings (cox) | New Zealand; Brett Hollister (cox); Kevin Lawton; Barrie Mabbott; Don Symon; Ross Tong |
| Coxless four | New Zealand; Les O'Connell; Shane O'Brien; Conrad Robertson; Keith Trask | United States; David Clark; Jonathan Smith; Phillip Stekl; Alan Forney | Denmark; Michael Jessen; Lars Nielsen; Per Rasmussen; Erik Christiansen |
| Eights | Canada; Blair Horn; Dean Crawford; J. Michael Evans; Paul Steele; Grant Main; Mark Evans; Kevin Neufeld; Pat Turner; Brian McMahon (cox) | United States; Chip Lubsen; Andrew Sudduth; John Terwilliger; Chris Penny; Tom Darling; Fred Borchelt; Charles Clapp; Bruce Ibbetson; Bob Jaugstetter (cox) | Australia; Craig Muller; Clyde Hefer; Samuel Patten; Tim Willoughby; Ian Edmunds; James Battersby; Ion Popa; Stephen Evans; Gavin Thredgold (cox) |

=== Women's events ===
| Games | Gold | Silver | Bronze |
|---|---|---|---|
| Single sculls | Valeria Răcilă; Romania | Charlotte Geer; United States | Ann Haesebrouck; Belgium |
| Double sculls | Mariora Popescu and Elisabeta Oleniuc; Romania | Greet Hellemans and Nicolette Hellemans; Netherlands | Daniele Laumann and Silken Laumann; Canada |
| Quadruple sculls (coxed) | Romania; Titie Taran; Anisoara Sorohan; Ioana Badea; Sofia Corban; Ecaterina Oancia | United States; Anne Marden; Lisa Rohde; Joan Lind; Ginny Gilder; Kelly Rickon | Denmark; Hanne Eriksen; Birgitte Hanel; Charlotte Koefoed; Bodil Rasmussen; Jette Sørensen |
| Coxless pairs | Rodica Arba and Elena Horvat; Romania | Elizabeth Craig and Tricia Smith; Canada | Ellen Becker and Iris Völkner; West Germany |
| Coxed four | Romania; Florica Lavric; Maria Fricioiu; Chira Apostol; Olga Bularda; Viorica Ioja | Canada; Marilyn Brain; Angela Schneider; Barbara Armbrust; Jane Tregunno; Lesley Thompson | Australia; Robyn Grey-Gardner; Karen Brancourt; Susan Chapman; Margot Foster; Susan Lee |
| Eight | United States; Kristen Thorsness; Kristine Norelius; Shyril O'Steen; Carie Graves; Kathy Keeler; Harriet Metcalf; Betsy Beard; Carol Bower; Jeanne Flanagan | Romania; Marioara Trașcă; Lucia Sauca; Doina Liliana Snep-Balan; Aneta Mihaly; Aurora Plesca; Camelia Diaconescu; Viorica Ioja; Mihaela Armășescu; Adriana Bazon-Chelariu | Netherlands; Wiljon Vaandrager; Marieke van Drogenbroek; Harriet van Ettekoven; Catharina Neelissen; Anne Quist; Nicolette Hellemans; Martha Laurijsen; Greet Hellemans; Lynda Cornet |

== Medal table ==
| Rank | Nation | Gold | Silver | Bronze | Total |
|---|---|---|---|---|---|
| 1 | Romania | 6 | 2 | 0 | 8 |
| 2 | United States | 2 | 5 | 1 | 8 |
| 3 | Canada | 1 | 2 | 3 | 6 |
| 4 | West Germany | 1 | 1 | 1 | 3 |
| 5 | New Zealand | 1 | 0 | 1 | 2 |
| 6 | Finland | 1 | 0 | 0 | 1 |
| 6 | Great Britain | 1 | 0 | 0 | 1 |
| 6 | Italy | 1 | 0 | 0 | 1 |
| 9 | Australia | 0 | 1 | 2 | 3 |
| 10 | Belgium | 0 | 1 | 1 | 2 |
| 10 | Netherlands | 0 | 1 | 1 | 2 |
| 12 | Spain | 0 | 1 | 0 | 1 |
| 13 | Denmark | 0 | 0 | 2 | 2 |
| 14 | Norway | 0 | 0 | 1 | 1 |
| 14 | Yugoslavia | 0 | 0 | 1 | 1 |
| Totals (15 entries) | | 14 | 14 | 14 | 42 |

== See also ==
- Rowing at the Summer Olympics
- List of Olympic medalists in rowing (men)
- List of Olympic medalists in rowing (women)
- Rowing at the Friendship Games
- Rowers at the 1984 Summer Olympics
