= 1984 Canadian men's eight =

National rowing team

The 1984 men's eight rowing team was a Canadian rowing team that won a gold medal in the 1984 Summer Olympic Games.

The members of the 1984 Men's Eight Rowing Team were Blair Horn, Dean Crawford, J. Michael Evans, Paul Steele, Grant Main, Mark Evans, Kevin Neufeld, Pat Turner and Brian McMahon (cox). The team, coached by Neil Campbell (a rowing Olympian in 1964 and 1968), came together in 1984 and won the gold medal at the 1984 Olympic Games in Los Angeles, warding off a furious last-minute challenge from the home-crowd favourites, the team from the US.

This win represented the first time that the Canadian men's eight won an Olympic or World Championship gold medal. That same year this team also won gold at the Lucerne International Regatta in Switzerland at which all the rowing nations of the era (including the Soviet Union and East Germany) were present. Although the crew only came together in 1984, members of the crew had competed individually in other crews before 1984. Among their ranks were Pan American Games medallists, World Junior Championships medallists and medallists in several other prestigious events such as the Henley Royal Regatta.

The success of this crew laid the foundation for numerous Canadian Olympic and World Championship victories in the men's and women's eights that followed.

== Honours ==
- In 1985, inducted into the BC Sports Hall of Fame.
- In 2003, inducted into the Canadian Olympic Hall of Fame.
