= Rowing at the 1984 Summer Olympics – Men's eight =

Rowing at the Games of the XXIII Olympiad
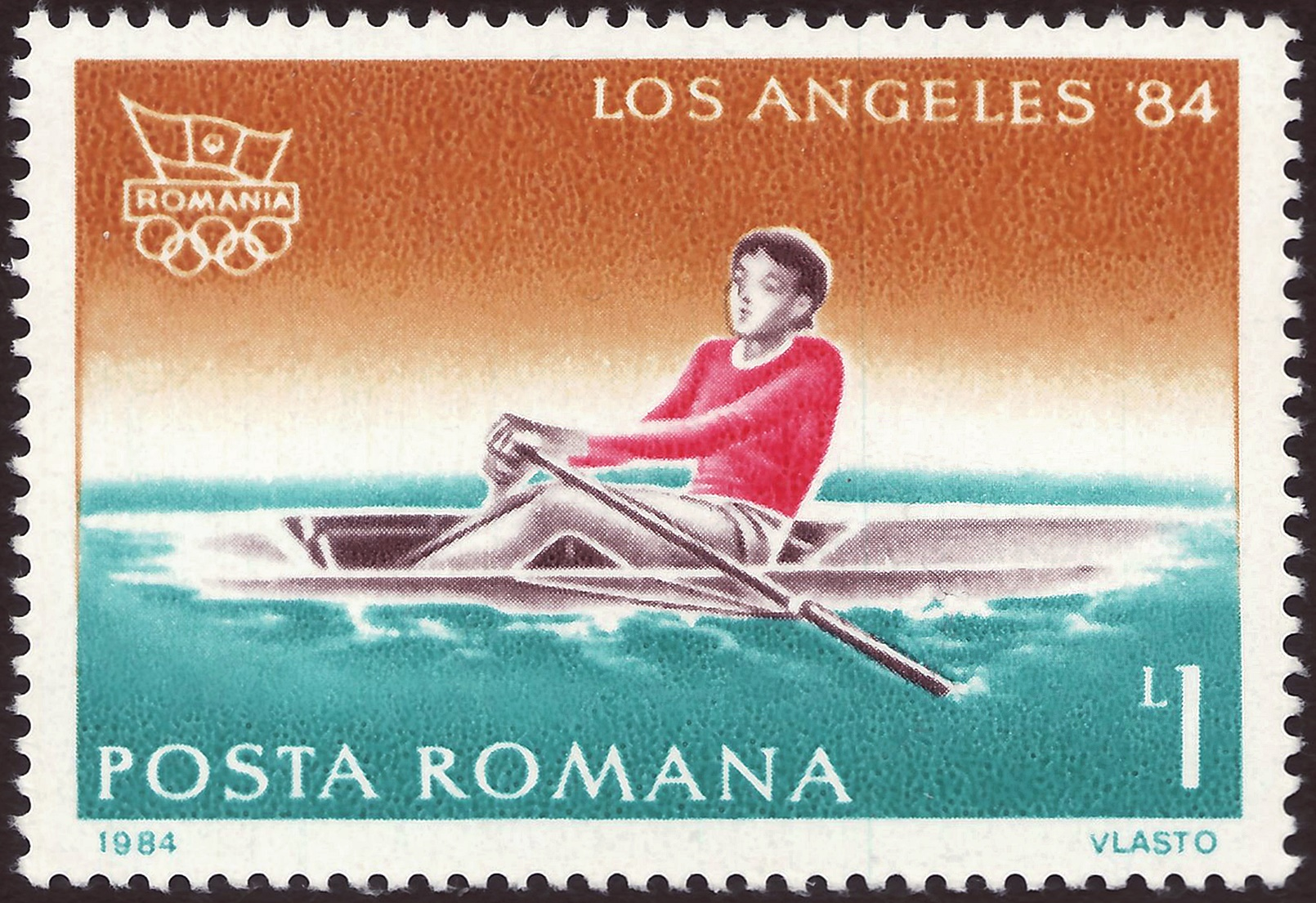
- Romania stamp commemorating rowing at the 1984 Olympics
- Venue: Lake Casitas
- Dates: 31 July – 5 August 1984
- Competitors: 63 from 7 nations
- Winning time: 5:41.32

Medalists
| 1st place, gold medalist(s) | | Canada: Blair Horn; Dean Crawford; J. Michael Evans; Paul Steele; Grant Main; Mark Evans; Kevin Neufeld; Pat Turner; Brian McMahon (cox) |
| 2nd place, silver medalist(s) | | United States: Chip Lubsen; Andrew Sudduth; John Terwilliger; Chris Penny; Tom Darling; Fred Borchelt; Charles Clapp; Bruce Ibbetson; Bob Jaugstetter (cox) |
| 3rd place, bronze medalist(s) | | Australia: Craig Muller; Clyde Hefer; Samuel Patten; Tim Willoughby; Ian Edmunds; James Battersby; Ion Popa; Stephen Evans; Gavin Thredgold (cox) |

The men's eight (M8+) competition at the 1984 Summer Olympics took place at Lake Casitas in Ventura County, California, United States. It was held from 31 July to 5 August. There were 7 boats (63 competitors) from 7 nations, with each nation limited to a single boat in the event. New Zealand had won the last two world championships, and the other strong team, East Germany, was absent from the event due to the Eastern Bloc boycott. This made New Zealand the strong favourite. But the final was won by Canada, with the United States and Australia the other medallists, and New Zealand coming a disappointing fourth.

== Background ==
This was the 19th appearance of the event. Rowing had been on the programme in 1896 but was cancelled due to bad weather. The men's eight has been held every time that rowing has been contested, beginning in 1900.

East Germany had for many years been the dominating country for this boat class. From the 1976 Summer Olympics to the 1980 Summer Olympics, the country won every gold at Olympic and World Rowing Championships level. At the 1981 World Rowing Championships, East Germany came in fourth place, with the Soviet Union winning gold. In 1982 and 1983, the event was won by New Zealand, with East Germany coming second on both occasions. With the Soviet Bloc boycott affecting the 1984 Summer Olympics, New Zealand was thus regarded as the strong favourite. Another medal contender was the United States; they had won the 1983 Pan American Games.

Chile made its debut in the event. The United States made its 16th appearance, most among nations to that point.

=== Previous M8+ competitions ===
| Competition | Gold | Silver | Bronze |
|---|---|---|---|
| 1976 Summer Olympics | East Germany | Great Britain | New Zealand |
| 1977 World Rowing Championships | East Germany | Soviet Union | West Germany |
| 1978 World Rowing Championships | East Germany | West Germany | New Zealand |
| 1979 World Rowing Championships | East Germany | New Zealand | Soviet Union |
| 1980 Summer Olympics | East Germany | Great Britain | Soviet Union |
| 1981 World Rowing Championships | Soviet Union | Great Britain | United States |
| 1982 World Rowing Championships | New Zealand | East Germany | Russia |
| 1983 World Rowing Championships | New Zealand | East Germany | Australia |

== Competition format ==
The "eight" event featured nine-person boats, with eight rowers and a coxswain. It was a sweep rowing event, with the rowers each having one oar (and thus each rowing on one side). The rowing competition consisted of two main rounds (semifinals and finals), as well as a repechage round after the semifinals. However, neither the semifinals nor the repechage eliminated any boats; all seven teams advanced to the "A" final, and no "B" final was held. The course used the 2000 metres distance that became the Olympic standard in 1912 (with the exception of 1948). Races were held in up to six lanes, except the final in which (very unusually) seven boats raced.

- Semifinals: Two heats with three or four boats each. The top boat in each semifinal (2 boats total) went to the "A" final, while the remaining boats (5 total) went to the repechage.
- Repechage: A single heat with five boats. All five advanced to the "A" final.
- Finals: The "A" final consisted of all seven boats, competing for the medals and 4th through 7th place.

== Schedule ==
All times are Pacific Daylight Time (UTC-7)

| Date | Time | Round |
|---|---|---|
| Tuesday, 31 July 1984 | | Semifinals |
| Thursday, 2 August 1984 | | Repechage |
| Sunday, 5 August 1984 | | Final |

== Results ==
=== Semifinal ===
The two semifinal heats were rowed on 31 July. The winner of each heat advanced to the final, while the remaining teams went to the repechage.

==== Semifinal 1 ====
| Rank | Rowers | Coxswain | Nation | Time | Notes |
|---|---|---|---|---|---|
| 1 | Nigel Atherfold; Dave Rodger; Roger White-Parsons; George Keys; Greg Johnston; Chris White; Andrew Stevenson; Mike Stanley | Andy Hay | New Zealand | 5:48.19 | Q |
| 2 | Blair Horn; Dean Crawford; J. Michael Evans; Paul Steele; Grant Main; Mark Evans; Kevin Neufeld; Pat Turner | Brian McMahon | Canada | 5:50.44 | R |
| 3 | Duncan McDougall; Chris Mahoney; Salih Hassan; Clive Roberts; Adam Clift; John Pritchard; Malcolm McGowan; Allan Whitwell | Colin Moynihan | Great Britain | 5:55.18 | R |
| 4 | Alain Duprat; Dominique Lecointe; Thierry Louvet; Patrick Vibert-Vichet; Jacques Taborski; Jean-Jacques Martigne; Olivier Pons; Bernard Chevalier | Jean-Pierre Huguet-Balent | France | 5:59.81 | R |

==== Semifinal 2 ====
| Rank | Rowers | Coxswain | Nation | Time | Notes |
|---|---|---|---|---|---|
| 1 | Chip Lubsen; Andrew Sudduth; John Terwilliger; Chris Penny; Tom Darling; Fred Borchelt; Charles Clapp; Bruce Ibbetson | Bob Jaugstetter | United States | 5:51.95 | Q |
| 2 | Craig Muller; Clyde Hefer; Samuel Patten; Tim Willoughby; Ian Edmunds; James Battersby; Ion Popa; Stephen Evans | Gavin Thredgold | Australia | 5:56.61 | R |
| 3 | Mario Castro; Víctor Contreras; Zibor Llanos; Rodolfo Pereira; Alejandro Rojas; Marcelo Rojas; Giorgio Vallebuona; Carlos Neyra | Rodrigo Abasolo (Note: The Chilean rowers are listed as per the official Olympic record, but the listing is wrong, as it has the cox in seat one, when he should be listed for seat nine) | Chile | 6:20.71 | R |

=== Repechage ===
One heat was rowed in the repechage on 2 August. All five teams advanced to the final.

| Rank | Rowers | Coxswain | Nation | Time | Notes |
|---|---|---|---|---|---|
| 1 | Craig Muller; Clyde Hefer; Samuel Patten; Tim Willoughby; Ian Edmunds; James Battersby; Ion Popa; Stephen Evans | Gavin Thredgold | Australia | 5:51.68 | Q |
| 2 | Blair Horn; Dean Crawford; J. Michael Evans; Paul Steele; Grant Main; Mark Evans; Kevin Neufeld; Pat Turner | Brian McMahon | Canada | 5:56.44 | Q |
| 3 | Duncan McDougall; Chris Mahoney; Salih Hassan; Clive Roberts; Adam Clift; John Pritchard; Malcolm McGowan; Allan Whitwell | Colin Moynihan | Great Britain | 6:00.45 | Q |
| 4 | Mario Castro; Carlos Neyra; Zibor Llanos; Giorgio Vallebuona; Alejandro Rojas; Víctor Contreras; Rodolfo Pereira; Marcelo Rojas | Rodrigo Abasolo | Chile | 6:10.98 | Q |
| 5 | Alain Duprat; Dominique Lecointe; Thierry Louvet; Patrick Vibert-Vichet; Jacques Taborski; Jean-Jacques Martigne; Olivier Pons; Bernard Chevalier | Jean-Pierre Huguet-Balent | France | 6:18.71 | Q |

=== Final ===
All seven teams that entered the competition rowed in a single final on 5 August.

| Rank | Rowers | Coxswain | Nation | Time |
|---|---|---|---|---|
| 1st place, gold medalist(s) | Blair Horn; Dean Crawford; J. Michael Evans; Paul Steele; Grant Main; Mark Evans; Kevin Neufeld; Pat Turner | Brian McMahon | Canada | 5:41.32 |
| 2nd place, silver medalist(s) | Chip Lubsen; Andrew Sudduth; John Terwilliger; Chris Penny; Tom Darling; Fred Borchelt; Charles Clapp; Bruce Ibbetson | Bob Jaugstetter | United States | 5:41.74 |
| 3rd place, bronze medalist(s) | Craig Muller; Clyde Hefer; Samuel Patten; Tim Willoughby; Ian Edmunds; James Battersby; Ion Popa; Stephen Evans | Gavin Thredgold | Australia | 5:43.40 |
| 4 | Nigel Atherfold; Dave Rodger; Roger White-Parsons; George Keys; Greg Johnston; Chris White; Andrew Stevenson; Mike Stanley | Andy Hay | New Zealand | 5:44.14 |
| 5 | Duncan McDougall; Chris Mahoney; Salih Hassan; Clive Roberts; Adam Clift; John Pritchard; Malcolm McGowan; Allan Whitwell | Colin Moynihan | Great Britain | 5:47.01 |
| 6 | Alain Duprat; Dominique Lecointe; Thierry Louvet; Patrick Vibert-Vichet; Jacques Taborski; Jean-Jacques Martigne; Olivier Pons; Bernard Chevalier | Jean-Pierre Huguet-Balent | France | 5:49.52 |
| 7 | Mario Castro; Carlos Neyra; Zibor Llanos; Giorgio Vallebuona; Alejandro Rojas; Víctor Contreras; Rodolfo Pereira; Marcelo Rojas | Rodrigo Abasolo | Chile | 6:07.03 |
