= University College Boat Club (Oxford) =

Rowing club at the University of Oxford

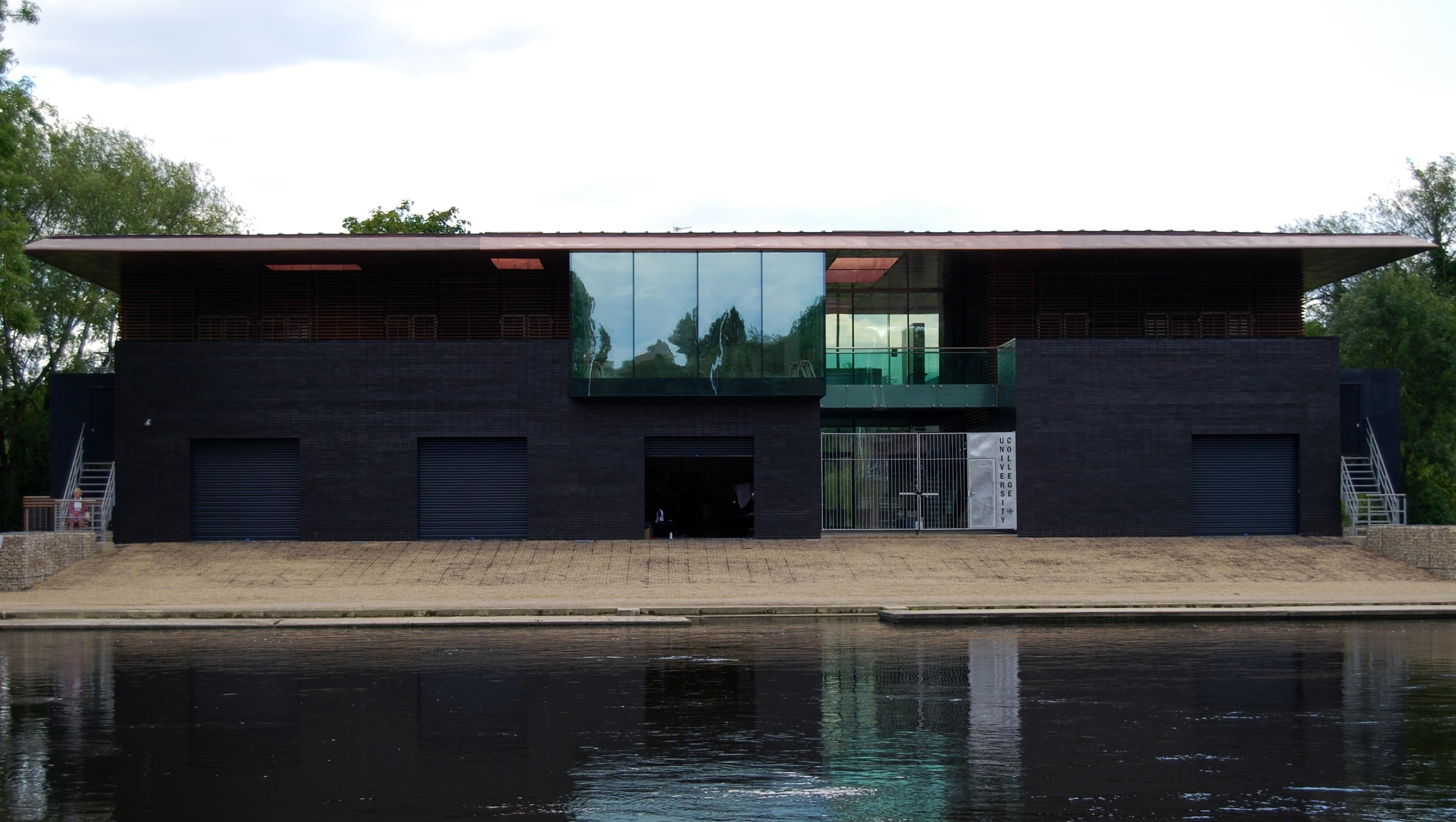

- University College Boathouse and the blade colours
- Location: University College Boathouse
- Coordinates: 51.7421°N 1.2497°W
- Home water: River Thames (known in Oxford as the Isis)
- Founded: 1827
- Head of the River: Men: 1841, 1843, 1869, 1870, 1871, 1874, 1875, 1877, 1878, 1902, 1914, 1990, 1991; Women: 2022, 2026
- Torpids Headship: Men: 1843, 1869, 1870, 1871, 1872, 1873, 1905, 1906, 1926; Women: 2023
- Colours
- Affiliations: British Rowing (boat code UCO); Trinity Hall BC (Sister College); Martlet Club (Alumni Club)
- Website: www.univboatclub.com
- Acronym: UCBC

University College Boat Club (commonly abbreviated to UCBC) is the rowing club for all members of University College, Oxford ("Univ"). UCBC is based out of the college's own boathouse on the towpath side of the Isis.

UCBC is one of the more successful college clubs in Oxford, having won multiple headships for both their Men's and Women's crews at the annual intercollegiate bumps races: Torpids and Summer Eights.

== History ==
The idea of inter collegiate racing was pioneered by Brasenose College Boat Club and Jesus College Boat Club in 1815. In 1827, it was decided to form a University College eight. The origins of UCBC can be attributed to one student, William Roper, who supervised the raising of £100 to build a boat and select a crew. Whilst the crew did not compete in 1829 or 1832-8 it has done so almost continuously until the present day, first going Head of the River in 1841.

The mid nineteenth century was a period of great success for UCBC being Head of the River in 1869–71, 1874–5 and 1877–8. One undergraduate Charles Cree recorded the celebrations in 1871:

"Univ. Head in the Eights. Univ, though Balliol came near them were never in danger...The Eight supped with Snell and the rest of us joined them after supper, and had a glorious evening. Singing and shouting as well as our voices would let us — Everything went off well no one being drunk."

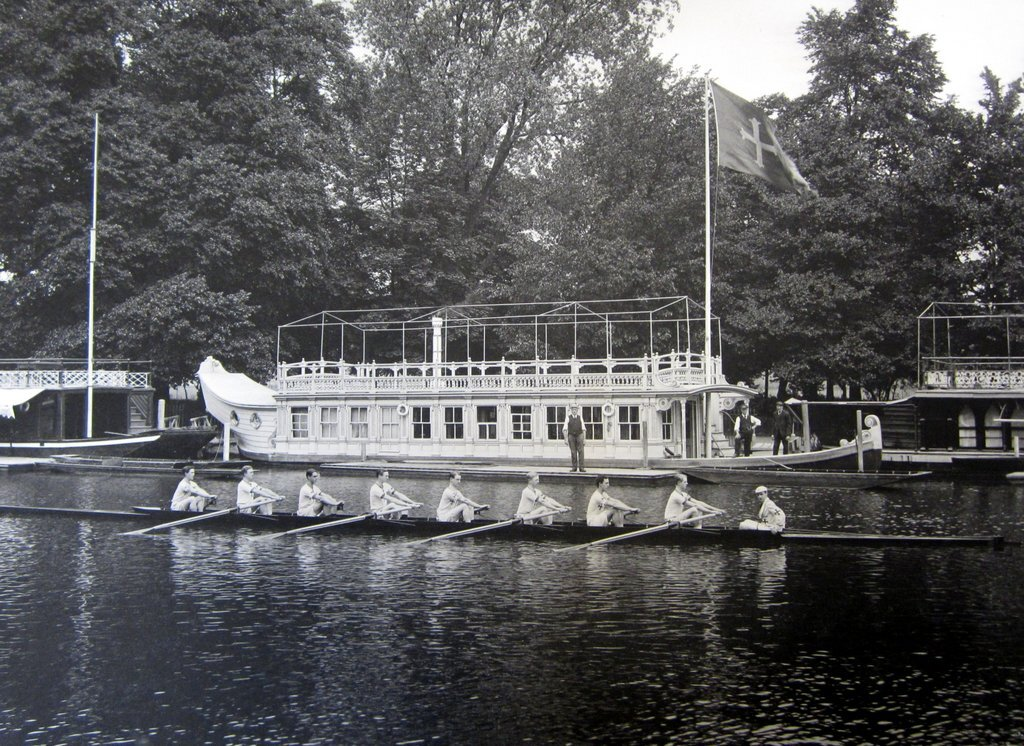
UCBC First Eight 1914

Univ won the headship in 1914.

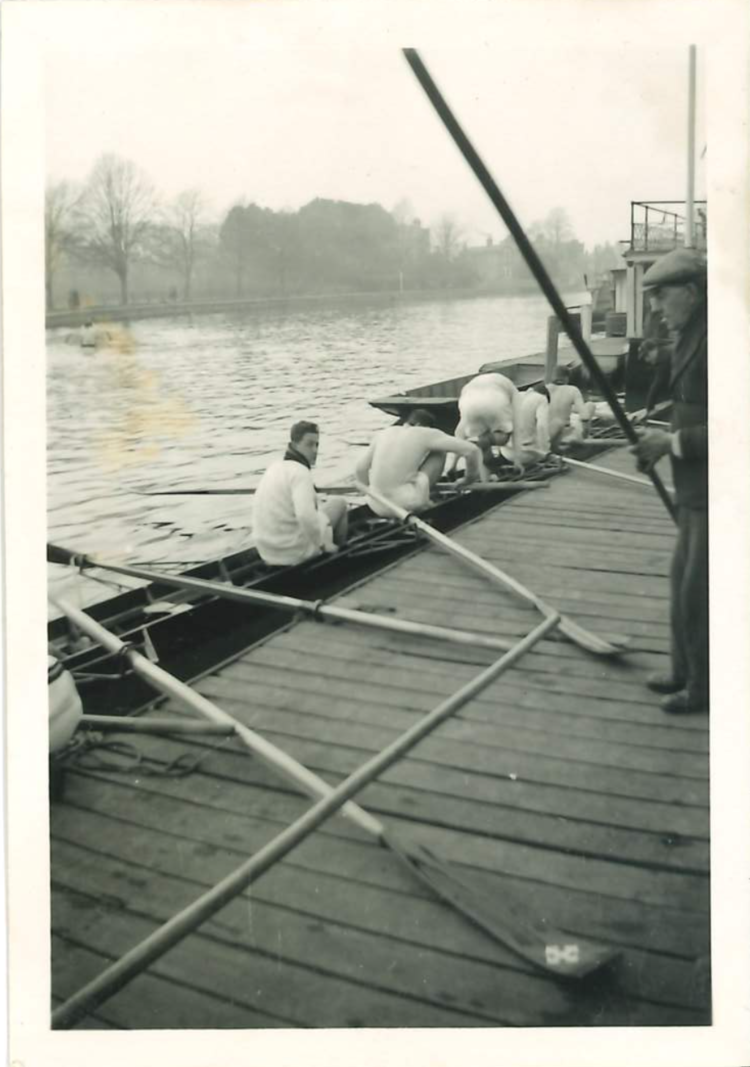
Univ's First Torpid 1952

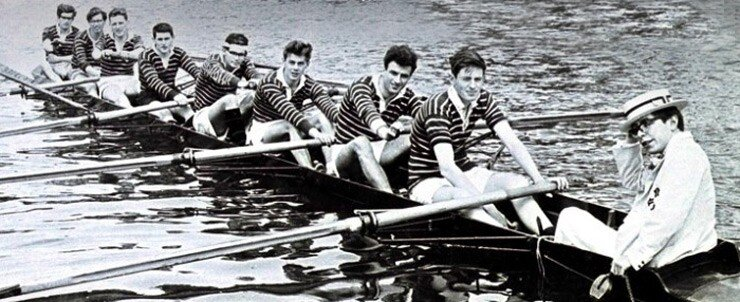
Stephen Hawking coxing the 1963 First Eight

Stephen Hawking was a member of the club in the 1960s, coxing the Men's Second VIII. The club features on the front cover of his autobiography, My Brief History.

== Racing ==
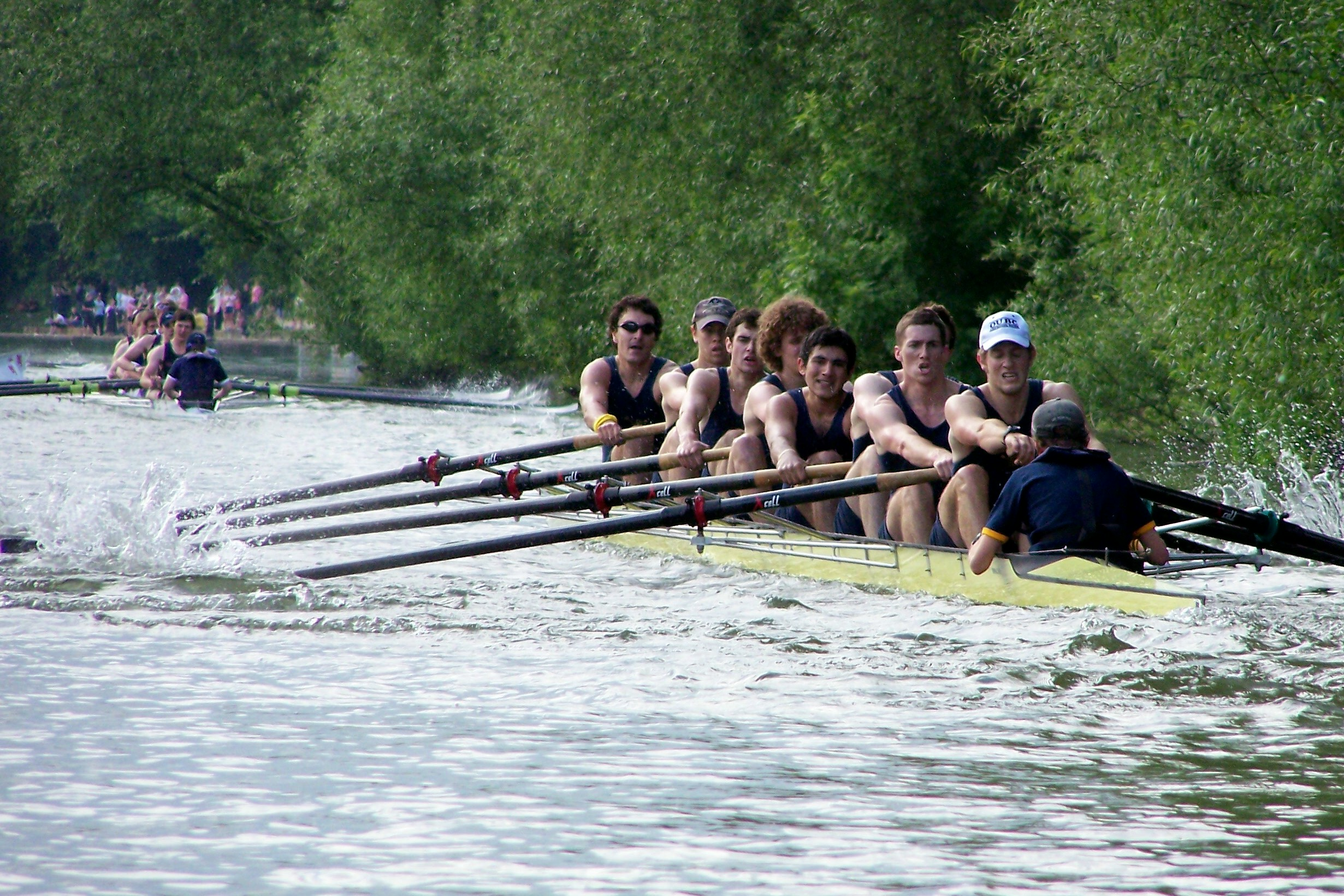
Men's 1st VIII Summer Eights 2007 coxed by Acer Nethercott

UCBC has enjoyed great success in recent years. In 2023, their Women's First Torpid went Head of the River, a position that they retain heading into 2025. The Women's First Eight won the Headship in 2022 and, as of 2024, remain third on the river.

The Men's First Eight last went Head of the River in 1990 and 1991. In recent years, the First Eight last achieved blades in 2006 and, in 2024, went +3 to finish at sixth on the river. The Men's First Torpid also achieved blades in 2023 to finish at fifth on the river.

Lower-down the divisions, the club qualified more boats for Eights 2012 and 2014 than any other college, and with 8 'Eights' competing in 2022. The women's and men's second boats have long been in "fixed divisions" in both Torpids and Summer Eights, and, as such, are guaranteed a place in racing each year. The Men's Second Torpid recently achieved blades in 2022 and 2023, in addition to the Second Eight achieving blades in 2013. Similarly, the Women's Second Torpid achieved blades in 2011, 2012, 2019, and 2021, alongside the Second Eight's blades in 2011, 2014, and 2018.

UCBC also usually fields third (and sometimes fourth or fifth) boats for bumps events, with many of them achieving blades in the last decade. The club's lowest boat on each side is usually considered it's 'Beer Boat' and is a crew that have never trained together, frequently includes alumni from the Martlet Club, and just shows up on the day to see what they can achieve.

UCBC has a strong novice program, with large numbers of boats entered every year for Nepthys Regatta and Tamesis Regatta. The former being won in 2012 and 2021 by the Men's Novice A crew.

In addition to the Oxford-based races, Univ crews compete in external events including the Fairbairn Cup, the Head of the River Race, the Women's Eights Head of the River Race, Henley Women's Regatta, Henley Royal Regatta as composites with other colleges, and many regional and national events.

== Training ==
=== The Boathouse ===
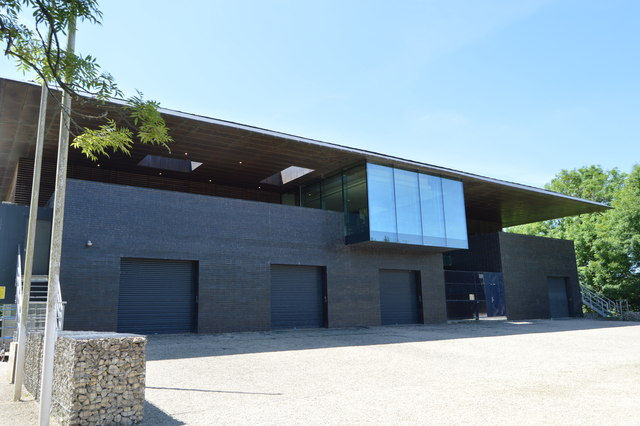
University College Boathouse

UCBC's boathouse is shared with the boat clubs of Somerville College, St Peter's College and Wolfson College. The original 19th century boathouse, designed by John Oldrid Scott, succumbed to arson in 1999. After eight years, a new boathouse was finished, designed by Belsize Architects. The Boathouse has been awarded a Royal Institute of British Architects (RIBA) prize. The £2.7million structure has enjoyed a favourable reception in the architectural world. Yuli Toh's article describes the structure as not just a boathouse, but "a grandstand of the first order" arguing that it represents a new age in rowing. The Boathouse was also subject of a recent article in the Row360 rowing magazine.

Saturday of Eights’ Week 2007 saw the opening of the new boathouse by Colin Moynihan (1974) who coxed the college and the university, won a silver medal at the Moscow Olympics in 1980, gained a boxing Blue, later became Minister of Sport, and is now Chairman of the British Olympic Association. The ceremony also marked the dedication of the Coleman Viewing Terrace by financial donors Jimmy Coleman (1963) and Jamie Coleman (1994).

=== Other facilities ===
The boathouse gym is equipped with 8 Model D Concept2 indoor rowers, stretching/exercise mats and balls, along with changing rooms for crews. Additionally UCBC has a weights gym in the college itself, which is full of free standing wights. Their members also have unlimited free access to all the training facilities of the University Sports Complex on Iffley Road, including the 8 seat rowing tank.

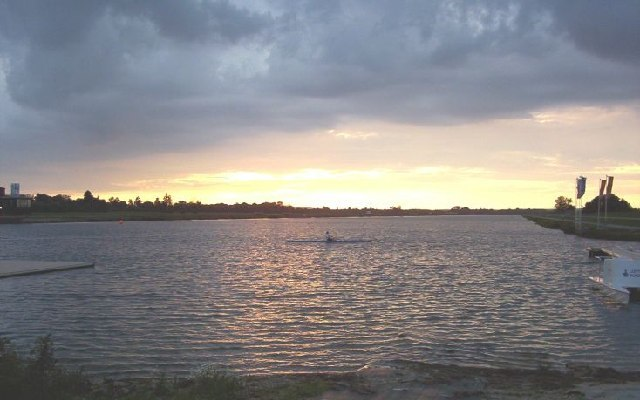
Dorney Lake

UCBC also enjoys exclusive access to the Redgrave Pinsent Rowing Lake in Caversham, being the only college in Oxford or Cambridge granted access. Caversham's first-class lake and facilities are used only by the GB squad, the University Blues squad and UCBC. The club also train regularly at Eton Dorney, Abingdon, Swindon, and Radley to escape the congestion of the Isis in Oxford.

=== Equipment ===
The men's side of the boat club uses the following shells:

Class	Make	Name	Notes
8+	Empacher (2006)	Lord and Lady Butler	Named after the former Master of the college, and his wife.
8+	Empacher (2008)	Norman Dix	Named after the club's former Boatman. Previously there had been a wooden boat bearing this name.
8+	Janousek (2000)	Michael Collins	Named after the club's Senior Member and Emeritus Mathematics Fellow.
8+	Janousek (2000)	Phoenix	...from the flames (purchased after boathouse fire).
4+	Janousek (2002)	George Cawkwell II	Named after the Emeritus Fellow.
4+			Unnamed bowloader.
2-/2x (85 kg)	Janousek (2002)	The Two Bills	Named after both the then Head Porter and then Chaplain.
2-/2x			Unnamed
2-/2x		Centurion	
1x (85 kg)	Janousek (2002)	Bob	

The women's side of the Boat Club uses the following shells:

Class	Make	Name	Notes
8+	Hudson	Margaret Chamberlain	Named after the founder of UCWBC
8+	Empacher (2008)	Minnie Coleman	Named after the wife of Old Member and benefactor, Jimmy Coleman.
8+	Janousek	Claire Sherriff	Named after Claire Sherriff, benefactor and supporter of UCBC.
8+	Janousek (2007)	Margaret Chamberlain	Named after the first Captain of UCWBC.
8+	Janousek	Marion Screaton	
4+			Unnamed bowloader
4+	Janousek (2002)	Marjorie Collins	Named after the wife of UCBC's Senior Member & Emeritus Mathematics Fellow.
4+	Janousek (2014)	Acer Nethercott	Named after UCBC alumnus Acer Nethercott.
4-			Unnamed
2-/2x			Unnamed
1x	Janousek (2002)	David	Named after David Sherriff, benefactor and supporter of UCBC.
1x	Stampfli	Marjorie	Named after the wife of UCBC's Senior Member & Emeritus Mathematics Fellow. Named following the Women's 1st VIII's Headship in 2022.

== Alumni ==
=== Notable alumni ===
- Colin Moynihan, Olympic Silver Medallist Moscow 1980 Olympics and Chairman of the British Olympic Committee.
- Acer Nethercott, Olympic Silver Medallist, Cox GB 8+, Beijing 2008 Olympics.
- Mark Evans and Mike Evans Olympic Gold Medallists, Canadian 8+, Los Angeles 1984 Olympics.
- Tom Solesbury, GB pair, Beijing 2008 Olympics, and GB Quad, London 2012 Olympics.
- Stephen Hawking, physicist. Coxed whilst studying at Univ, prior to his debilitating illness.
- Roz Savage, ocean rower, speaker, campaigner, and Member of Parliament. First woman ever to row solo across three oceans.
- Neil Gorsuch, US Supreme Court Justice

=== Martlet Club ===
Founded in 2022, the Martlet Club is a British Rowing affiliated boat club that gives Univ alumni the opportunity to race together alongside financially supporting UCBC.

The active Martlet Club is currently a small group of recent graduates, still primarily based in Oxford. While the club continues to grow, it is placing particular focus on entering alumni crews to notable regattas such as Women's Eights Head of the River Race and to the Fairbairn Cup, winning the latter's invitational category in 2023.

=== Martlet Regatta ===
Every year on the Sunday after Summer Eights, the Martlet Club hosts Martlet Regatta. This is an opportunity for scratch alumni crews who have never rowed together to race against current students, or to casually paddle with old team mates.

=== Dinosaurs and Cassandrians ===
Univ members who have rowed or coxed all days of Summer Eights as part of the Men's 1st VIII are entitled to become a member of the Dinosaurs dining club. Similarly, members who have rowed or coxed all days of Summer Eights as part of the Women's 1st VIII are entitled to become a member of the Cassandrians dining club. An annual Dinosaurs and Cassandrians dinner is held (usually in January) where many Old Members return to the college to celebrate Univ rowing alongside other Dinos and Cassies who are still current Univ members. The dinner is organised by the respective dining club Presidents who also help to organise the induction of new members to the society.

== Honours ==
=== Henley Royal Regatta ===
Year	Races won
1862	Ladies' Challenge Plate
1863	Grand Challenge Cup, Stewards' Challenge Cup, Ladies' Challenge Plate
1864	Visitors' Challenge Cup
1866	Stewards' Challenge Cup, Visitors' Challenge Cup
1867	Stewards' Challenge Cup, Visitors' Challenge Cup
1868	Visitors' Challenge Cup
1869	Visitors' Challenge Cup
1875	Visitors' Challenge Cup
1876	Visitors' Challenge Cup
1900	Diamond Challenge Sculls
1901	Ladies' Challenge Plate
1902	Ladies' Challenge Plate
1903	Visitors' Challenge Cup

=== Boat Race Representatives ===
The following rowers were part of the rowing club at the time of their participation in The Boat Race.

Men's Boat Race

Year	Name
1839	Calverley Bewicke
1842	R. Menzies
1842	F. N. Menzies
1852	Henry Denne
1856	P. Gurdon
1857	P. Gurdon
1857	W. Hardy Wood
1858	W. Hardy Wood
1860	J. N. MacQueen
1860	C. I. Strong
1863	F. H. Kelly
1864	F. H. Kelly
1864	A. E. Seymour
1866	W. W. Wood
1867	W. P. Bowman
1867	J. H. Fish
1867	W. W. Wood
1867	J. C. Tinné
1868	J. C. Tinné
1869	S. H. Woodhouse
1869	J. C. Tinné
1870	R. W. B. Mirehouse
1870	A. G. P. Lewis
1870	S. H. Woodhouse
1871	S. H. Woodhouse
1875	J. E. Banks
1875	J. M. Boustead
1876	J. M. Boustead
1877	J. M. Boustead
1878	W. A. Ellison
1879	G. D. Rowe
1880	G. D. Rowe
1892	W. A. S. Hewett

Year	Name
1893	L. Portman (cox)
1894	L. Portman (cox)
1896	E. R. Balfour
1897	E. R. Balfour
1901	F. O. J. Huntley
1902	H. W. Adams
1902	F. O. J. Huntley
1903	E. G. Monier-William
1903	F. O. J. Huntley
1904	A. R. Balfour
1904	E. P. Evans
1905	A. R. Balfour
1905	E. P. Evans
1906	E. P. Evans
1908	A. McCulloch
1911	C. E. Tinné
1912	C. E. Tinné
1925	J. D. W. Thomson
1926	J. D. W. Thomson
1927	J. D. W. Thomson
1929	D. E. Tinne
1930	R. V. Low
1930	N. K. Hutton
1930	D. E. Tinne
1930	C. F. Martineau
1930	H. A. G. Durbridge (cox)
1931	D. E. Tinne
1935	E. E. D. Tomlin
1935	B. J. Sciortino
1936	B. J. Sciortino
1937	R. G. Rowe
1953	D. T. H. Davenport
1953	J. S. Howles

Year	Name
1953	W. R. Marsh (cox)
1954	W. R. Marsh (cox)
1957	S. F. A. Miskin
1958	S. F. A. Miskin
1966	E. C. Meyer
1974	P. G. P. Stoddart
1977	A. W. Shealey
1977	C. B. Moynihan (cox)
1978	A. W. Shealey
1983	Mike Evans
1983	Mark Evans
1984	Mike Evans
1984	Mark Evans
1986	C. G. H. Clark
1989	Alison Norrish (cox)
1990	Don J. Miller III
1991	Joseph G. Michels
1991	Robert W. Martin
1992	Joseph G. Michels
1993	Joseph G. Michels
1994	Sverke Lorgen
1996	Paul A. Berger
2003	John Adams
2003	Acer Nethercott (cox)
2004	Acer Nethercott (cox)
2005	Acer Nethercott (cox)
2009	Tom Solesbury
2010	Matt Evans
2015	William Hakim (cox)

Women's Boat Race

Year	Name
2017	Rebecca te Water Naudé

=== Summer Eights ===
Year	Results
1841	Men's Headship
1843	Men's Headship
1869	Men's Headship
1870	Men's Headship
1871	Men's Headship
1874	Men's Headship
1875	Men's Headship
1877	Men's Headship
1878	Men's Headship
1902	Men's Headship
1914	Men's Headship
1990	Men's Headship
1991	Men's Headship
2022	Women’s Headship
2026	Women’s Headship

Year	Results
1911	M1 Blades
1929	M1 Blades
1949	M3 Blades
1951	M4 Blades
1952	M4 Blades
1953	M4 Blades
1960	M2 Blades
1961	M3 Blades
1963	M1 Blades
1964	M1 Blades
1964	M2 Blades
1966	M4 Blades
1966	M5 Blades
1970	M2 Blades
1970	M3 Blades
1970	M4 Blades
1974	M3 Blades
1976	M2 Blades
1977	M4 Blades
1983	W1 Blades
1985	M1 Blades
1985	M3 Blades
1986	M4 Blades
1988	W1 Blades
1988	M3 Blades
1989	W1 Blades
1991	M2 Blades
1991	M3 Blades
1992	W2 Blades
1992	M3 Blades
2001	W2 Blades
2006	M1 Blades
2007	W2 Blades
2008	W2 Blades
2010	W1 Blades
2011	W1 Blades
2011	W2 Blades
2011	M3 Blades
2012	M4 Blades
2013	M2 Blades
2014	W2 Blades
2015	W1 Blades
2018	W2 Blades
2025	M2 Blades
2026	M3 Blades
2026	W3 Blades

=== Torpids ===
Year	Results
1843	Men's Headship
1869	Men's Headship
1870	Men's Headship
1871	Men's Headship
1872	Men's Headship
1873	Men's Headship
1905	Men's Headship
1906	Men's Headship
1926	Men's Headship
2023	Women’s Headship

Year	Results
1897	M1 Blades
1904	M2 Blades
1914	M1 Blades
1951	M2 Blades
1957	M2 Blades
1959	M2 Blades
1970	M2 Blades
1970	M3 Blades
1971	M2 Blades
1982	W1 Blades
1983	W1 Blades
1983	M2 Blades
1984	W1 Blades
1985	W1 Blades
1988	M1 Blades
1988	M2 Blades
1989	M1 Blades
1991	M1 Blades
1992	W1 Blades
1996	M3 Blades
1997	W1 Blades
2001	M1 Blades
2006	W1 Blades
2008	W1 Blades
2008	W2 Blades
2009	M1 Blades
2010	W1 Blades
2011	W1 Blades
2011	W2 Blades
2012	W2 Blades
2015	M2 Blades
2016	M1 Blades
2019	W2 Blades
2019	W3 Blades
2021	W1 Blades
2021	W2 Blades
2022	M2 Blades
2022	M3 Blades
2023	M1 Blades
2023	M2 Blades
