= Tim Willoughby =

Australian rower, yachtsman and investment banker

Personal information
- Nationality: Australian
- Born: 24 June 1954 Adelaide, South Australia
- Died: 9 January 2008 (aged 53)

Sport
- Sport: Rowing
- Club: Adelaide University Boat Club
Medal record
Men's rowing
Representing Australia
Olympic Games
Bronze medal – third place	1984 Los Angeles	Eight
World Rowing Championships
Bronze medal – third place	1983 Duisburg	Eight

Timothy John Willoughby (24 June 1954 – 9 January 2008) was an Australian rower, yachtsman and stockbroker. He was a five-time Australian national champion rower, a dual Olympian and won a bronze medal in the Australian men's eight at the 1984 Summer Olympics in Los Angeles.

== Club and state rowing ==
Born in Adelaide, South Australia in 1954, Willoughby first began to show promise as a rower whilst at St Mark's College at the University of Adelaide, where he was a boat captain in the Adelaide University Boat Club.

Willoughby was first selected to represent South Australia in the 1975 senior men's eight which contested the King's Cup at the Interstate Regatta. He made a total of nine King's Cup appearances for South Australia between 1975 and 1984. That was a golden period for South Australian heavyweight men's rowing and their eights won the title in 1981, 1982 and 1983; and placed second in 1975, 1977, 1979 and 1984.

From 1980 to 1983 in Adelaide University colours he contested the national coxed or coxless four titles each year at the Australian Rowing Championships. In 1980, 1982 and 1983 he also raced for the coxless pair title and he won those national championships in 1982 and 83.

== International representative rowing ==
Willoughby made his first Australian representation in the Australian men's eight selected to contest the 1980 Moscow Olympics. That crew finished with an overall fifth placing. He was selected in 1981 to a coxed four with Graham Jones, Jim Battersby and John Bentley who raced at the 1981 World Rowing Championships in Munich to a sixth placing. In 1982 that same four with Battersby changed out for Bruce Keynes was selected to contest the 1982 World Rowing Championships in Lucerne. They missed the A final and placed seventh overall.

In 1983, Willoughby secured the six seat of the Australian eight selected within a limited squad sent to the 1983 World Rowing Championships in Duisburg Germany. The eight performed well in lead up regattas at Vichy, Ratzeburg and Nottingham. In the final at the World Championships the Australian crew drew a bad lane and lost the benefit of the tail breeze however they raced a strong second 1000m and finished in third place for a bronze medal.

The Australian eight selected for the 1984 Los Angeles Olympics was built around the national champion Mosman Rowing Club coxed four of Jim Battersby, Craig Muller and Steve Evans. Willougby was selected in the four seat and made his second Olympics in Los Angeles. The Australian eight finished third in the final with a time of 5:43.40 winning bronze behind Canada and the USA.

== Yachtsman ==
Subsequent to his win in Los Angeles, Willoughby was a crew member of the Australian yacht Kookaburra III, which attempted to defend the America's Cup in 1987 but was defeated by the American yacht Stars & Stripes. He remained in Perth following the America's Cup and became president of the WA Olympic Council and of the Olympians Club of WA, representing Western Australia to the Australian Olympic Committee.

== Professional career ==
Willoughby spent twenty years as a stockbroker for the Goldman Sachs JBWere investment bank. Having left Goldman Sachs in late 2007, Willoughby was due to start work at the firm of Citi Smith Barney on 10 January 2008, but died suddenly on 9 January 2008 after suffering a heart attack on board a flight from the United States to Singapore, returning home from a family holiday in New Mexico.
