= Gavin Thredgold =

Australian rowing cox

Personal information
- Nationality: Australian
- Born: 6 October 1961 (age 64)

Sport
- Country: Australia
- Sport: Rowing
- Club: Port Adelaide Rowing Club
Medal record
Representing Australia
Men's rowing
Representing Australia
Olympic Games
Bronze medal – third place	1984 Los Angeles	Eight
World Rowing Championships
Bronze medal – third place	1983 Duisburg	M8+

Gavin Thredgold (born 6 October 1961) is an Australian former rowing coxswain and coach. He was an Australian national champion, an Olympian and a medalist at Olympic and world championships.

== State and club rowing ==
Thredgold was educated at Pulteney Grammar School where he took up rowing. His senior club rowing was from the Port Adelaide Rowing Club.

He was first selected for South Australia in the 1979 youth eight which contested the Noel Wilkinson trophy at the Interstate Regatta within the Australian Rowing Championships. In 1980 he again steered the South Australian youth eight. In 1982 he was selected to cox the South Australian senior men's eight who raced and won the 1982 King's Cup at the Interstate Regatta. He was in the stern of another successful South Australian King's Cup eight in 1983 and then to a second place in 1984. Then in 1985 and 1986 he was the coach of the South Australian King's Cup eights.

== International representative rowing ==
Thredgold made his Australian representative debut in a coxed four which contested the 1982 World Rowing Championships in Lucerne. They finished in overall seventh place.

The following year he was selected in the stern of the men's senior eight selected within a limited squad sent to the 1983 World Rowing Championships in Duisburg Germany. The eight performed well in lead up regattas at Vichy, Ratzeburg and Nottingham. In the final at the World Championships the Australian crew drew a bad lane and lost the benefit of the tail breeze however they raced a strong second 1000m and Thredgold steered that eight to a world championship bronze medal.

In the 1984 Olympic year half of the rowers in that 1983 eight - the national champion Mosman four of Evans, Muller, Hefer and Battersby - plus Thredgold were selected in the Australian men's eight to contest the 1984 Summer Olympics. They rowed to a bronze medal in Los Angeles behind the Canadian and USA boats and beat out a formidable New Zealand crew for third place.
