= Ian Edmunds =

Australian rower

Personal information
- Nationality: Australian
- Born: 25 August 1961 (age 65)

Sport
- Sport: Rowing
- Club: Uni of Queensland Rowing Club
Medal record
Men's rowing
Representing Australia
Olympic Games
Bronze medal – third place	1984 Los Angeles	Eight
World Rowing Championships
Bronze medal – third place	1983 Duisburg	Eight

Ian Edmunds (born 25 August 1961 in Queensland, Australia) is an Australian former rower. He is an Australian national champion, an Olympian and a 1984 Olympic medalist.

== Club and state rowing ==
Edmunds' senior rowing was from the University of Queensland Boat Club.

His first state selection to represent Queensland came in the 1981 youth eight which contested and won the Noel F Wilkinson Trophy at the Interstate Regatta within the Australian Rowing Championships.

In 1982 Edmunds was selected in the Queensland senior men's eight which contested the King's Cup at the Interstate Regatta. He made a further King's Cup appearance for Queensland in 1984.

== International representative rowing ==
Edmunds was first selected to Australian representation in 1982 in a coxed four who raced at the 1982 World Rowing U23 Championships in Vienna to a second place and a silver medal.

In 1983 Edmunds secured the three seat of the Australian eight selected within a limited squad sent to the 1983 World Rowing Championships in Duisburg Germany. The eight performed well in lead up regattas at Vichy, Ratzeburg and Nottingham. In the final at the World Championships the Australian crew drew a bad lane and lost the benefit of the tail breeze however they raced a strong second 1000m and finished in third place for a bronze medal.

The Australian eight selected for the 1984 Los Angeles Olympics was built around the national champion Mosman Rowing Club coxed four of Battersby, Muller and Evans. Edmunds was selected in the five seat. The Australian eight finished third in the final winning bronze behind Canada and the USA. It was Edmunds' last Australian representative appearance.
