= The Boat Race 1993 =

1993 boat race between Oxford and Cambridge universities

139th Boat Race
- Date: 27 March 1993
- Winner: Cambridge
- Margin of victory: 3 1/2 lengths
- Winning time: 17 minutes 0 seconds
- Overall record (Cambridge–Oxford): 70–68
- Umpire: Mark Evans (Oxford)

Other races
- Reserve winner: Goldie
- Women's winner: Cambridge

The 139th Boat Race took place on 27 March 1993. Held annually, the Boat Race is a side-by-side rowing race between crews from the Universities of Oxford and Cambridge along the River Thames. Cambridge, using "cleaver blades" for the first time in the history of the race, won by 3 1/2 lengths in a victory that was described in The Times as "crushingly conclusive". The winning time of 17 minutes exactly was the fourth-fastest time in the event. In winning the event, Cambridge prevented Oxford making it seventeen wins from the last eighteen races and levelling the overall score for the first time since the 1929 race.

Oxford's crew featured two Olympic gold medallists and saw changes in their rowers and cox in the lead-up to the event. The race was umpired by the former Oxford Blue Mark Evans who controversially instigated changes to the start procedure of the race.

In the reserve race, Cambridge's Goldie defeated Oxford's Isis, while Cambridge won the Women's Boat Race.

== Background ==
The Boat Race is a side-by-side rowing competition between the University of Oxford (sometimes referred to as the "Dark Blues") and the University of Cambridge (sometimes referred to as the "Light Blues"). First held in 1829, the race takes place on the 4.2-mile (6.8 km) Championship Course on the River Thames in southwest London. The rivalry is a major point of honour between the two universities; it is followed throughout the United Kingdom and broadcast worldwide. Oxford went into the race as reigning champions, having won the 1992 race by 1 1/4 lengths, with Cambridge leading overall with 69 victories to Oxford's 68 (excluding the "dead heat" of 1877). Oxford had won 16 of the previous 17 races, a run interrupted by Cambridge's seven-length victory in the 1986 race.

The first Women's Boat Race took place in 1927, but the event did not become an annual fixture until the 1960s. Until 2014, the contest was conducted as part of the Henley Boat Races, but as of the 2015 race, it is held on the River Thames, on the same day as the men's main and reserve races. The reserve race, contested between Oxford's Isis boat and Cambridge's Goldie boat has been held since 1965. It usually takes place on the Tideway, prior to the main Boat Race.

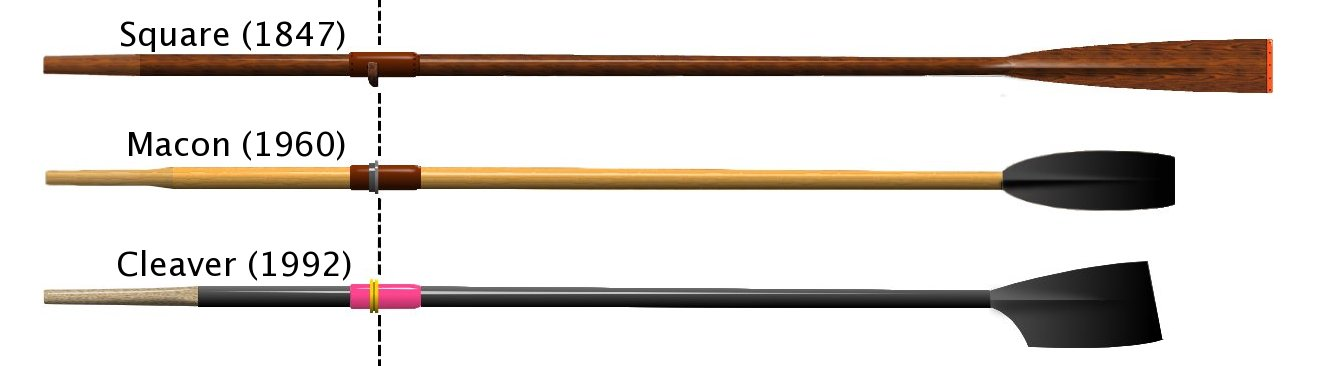
Cambridge used the cleaver blades (depicted bottom) for the first time in the competition, while Oxford used macon blades (middle).

Cambridge selected cleaver blades for the first time in the history of the race, following the successful use of the oars in the 1992 Summer Olympics in Barcelona. The surface area of the cleaver was approximately 20% larger than the conventional macon blades. Oxford practised with cleaver blades in some of their outings leading up to the race, and were prepared to use them should the weather conditions be suitable, but on the day itself they opted to remain with the macon blades.

The umpire for the race was the Canadian Olympic gold medallist and former Oxford Blue Mark Evans who had rowed in the 1983 and 1984 races. He caused controversy by instigating a new starting method whereby he would hold the crews for up to ten seconds between the conventional "set" and "go" commands. Evans had umpired the 1991 race in which he had also used his own starting method in preference to the traditional Amateur Rowing Association instructions. In response to any potential delay at the start during which time the boats will be dragged along with the tide, one of the stake-boat men, Bob Hastings, responsible for holding the boats until the "go" command is given stated: "If the boats start to drag I will let go, before I am dragged out of the stake-boat". Both Alan Inns, former coach and advisor to Cambridge, and Steve Royle, Oxford's director of rowing, expressed concerns over Evans' methodology.

== Crews ==
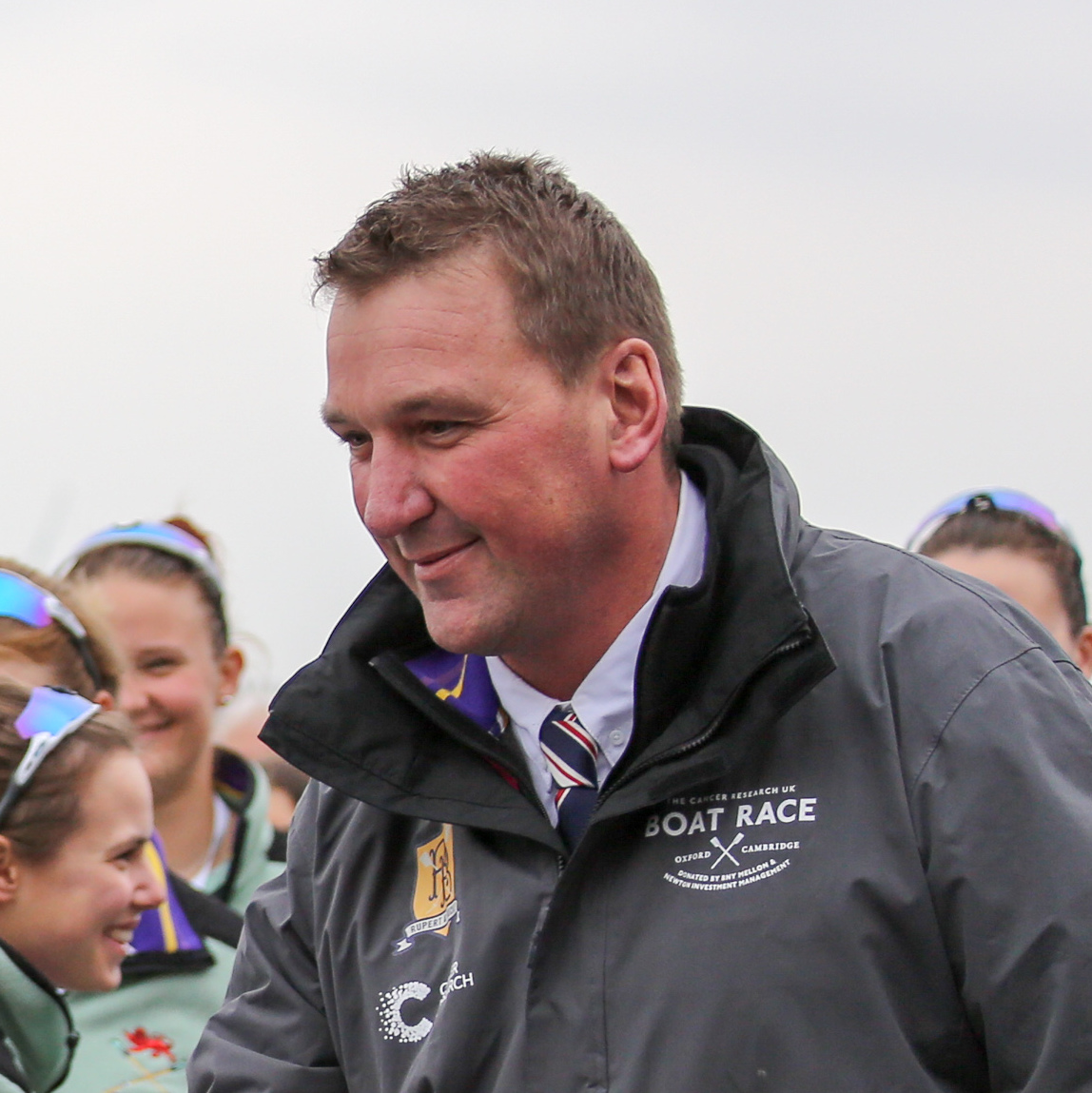
Matthew Pinsent (pictured in 2018) was the Oxford University Boat Club president in 1993.

The Oxford crew weighed an average of nearly 2 pounds (0.91 kg) more per rower than their opponents. Oxford's Matthew Pinsent was the heaviest rower while Cambridge's Sinclair Gore was the youngest, aged 19. Cambridge's crew featured three returning Blues in Dirk Bangert, David Gillard and James Behrens, while Oxford saw five former Boat Race rowers return. Overall, half of the rowers were non-British (six nationalities representing Oxford, three representing Cambridge) and the same number were postgraduates. The Cambridge boat club president Behrens claimed: "All our boat are at Cambridge on academic merit. They came for a particular course ... and they also row." In contrast, an editorial in The Times claimed: "The performers are no longer ingenuous native undergraduates but supercharged, international, professional rowing machines." Oxford's Bruce Robertson (men's eight) and Pinsent (coxless pair) were both gold medallists at the Barcelona Olympics.

A late change in the Oxford cox saw Samantha Benham replace Gordon Buxton to steer the Dark Blues, becoming the eighth female cox in the history of the race. Oxford's Royle noted that Buxton's form had declined in the run-in to the race, while Benham was "handling the pressure a lot better." Cambridge cox, Martin Haycock, suggested that female coxes were not as accomplished as their male counterparts: "We had one cox who was exceptionally good at giving massages but on the whole ... they're not aggressive or tough enough." Oxford also saw a change to their crew in the week preceding the race. Old Etonian undergraduate Ed Haddon (who had rowed for Isis in 1992) was dropped in favour of German Philipp Schuller. Schuller had arrived at Oxford just two months earlier, but rejected suggestions that his late inclusion was symptomatic of the recent influx of "professionals" to the race. Of his selection, he noted: "You can't have one of the most respected races in the world and then limit it to English people between the ages of 19 and 21 ... on the day we went for whoever would make the boat go fastest. It was done entirely on merit." Schuller's compatriot and opponent Dirk Bangert had struggled with the move to cleavers, finding it difficult to adjust his timing: "I nearly didn't make it. I couldn't get this rhythm until about three weeks ago and was not sure of my place."

Oxford's finishing coach was Mike Spracklen who had assisted the Dark Blues in five victorious races, while Cambridge had New Zealander Harry Mahon in charge for the first time, assisted by John Wilson (who had helped coach Oxford to a win in the 1991 race), and Sean Bowden, who was subsequently credited with "being half of the team which first turned Cambridge round". Oxford's head coach Patrick Sweeney noted: "If [Cambridge] get away, they will be hard to beat. If they don't, they're dead meat."

Seat	Oxford				Cambridge			
Seat	Name	Nationality	College	Weight	Name	Nationality	College	Weight
Bow	Kinglsey K Poole	Australian	St John's	12 st 13.5 lb	Dirk E Bangert	German	Fitzwilliam	12 st 9 lb
2	Joe G Michels	American	University	12 st 8.5 lb	David R Gillard	British	St Catharine's	13 st 2.5 lb
3	Boris Mavra	Serb	Jesus	14 st 1.5 lb	James H Behrens (P)	British	Downing	13 st 10.5 lb
4	Richard H Manners	British	Brasenose	14 st 13 lb	Richard C Phelps	British	St Edmund's	14 st 0 lb
5	B D Robertson	Canadian	Keble	14 st 12 lb	Jon A Bernstein	American	St Edmund's	14 st 8.5 lb
6	M C Pinsent (P)	British	St Catherine's	15 st 2.5 lb	M P Baker	American	St Edmund's	14 st 2.5 lb
7	Philip A Schuller †	German	St Catherine's	13 st 8 lb	Sinclair M Gore	Irish	Jesus	15 st 1 lb
Stroke	Ian W Gardiner	British	St Peter's	12 st 12.5 lb	Will T Mason	British	Trinity Hall	12 st 9 lb
Cox	Samantha L Benham ‡	British	Brasenose	7 st 7 lb	M N Haycock	British	Magdalene	7 st 9.5 lb
Sources: (P) – boat club president † – Philipp Schuller replaced Ed Haddon before the race. ‡ – Samantha Benham replaced Gordon Buxton the week before the race.

== Race ==
The Championship Course along which the Boat Race is contested

Oxford were strong pre-race favourites, having won 16 of the last 17 races. Cambridge won the toss and elected to start from the Surrey station. Two minutes after the start, and in cold, overcast conditions, Cambridge's cox Martin Haycock was level with Oxford's Jo Michels who occupied the number two seat in the Dark Blue boat. Responding to a call to push on, Cambridge were clear upon reaching the Mile Post in record time, and moved in front of Oxford. Further record times were set as the Light Blues passed under Hammersmith Bridge and by Chiswick Steps before they passed the finishing post 3 1/2 lengths clear in 17 minutes. It was Cambridge's first victory since the 1986 race and just their second victory in eighteen years. The winning time was the fourth fastest in the history of the event, surpassed only by Oxford in the 1991, 1984 and 1976 races, and was Cambridge's fastest time ever. Cambridge's victory prevented the overall score from being levelled for the first time since 1929.

In the reserve race, Cambridge's Goldie won by nine lengths over Isis, their sixth victory in seven years. Cambridge won the 48th Women's Boat Race by 4 1/2 lengths in a time of 6 minutes and 10 seconds, their fourth victory in five years.

== Reaction ==
The journalist David Miller, writing for The Times, described Cambridge's victory as "crushingly conclusive". Cambridge's Malcolm Baker said: "We knew we could do it after about 25 strokes." Behrens explained "Our strength was that we were more uniform than Oxford. We have proved that you do not have to be an Olympic champion to win the Boat Race." The Oxford Boat Club president Pinsent conceded: "They put right a lot of mistakes they have made in the past, and they rowed outstandingly well." Spracklen agreed: "Cambridge got too far away. They were a better boat in that race. All credit to them." Cambridge's number two, David Gillard, said "there was a lot of revenge out there".

Writing in The Independent, the journalist Chris Arnot noted that the Cambridge crew had used creatine supplements in order to attempt to enhance their performance. Used extensively at the 1992 Olympics, by athletes including Linford Christie and Sally Gunnell, and given to horses and greyhounds, creatine was believed to provide legal energy-enhancing effects to the crew.
