= Justine Carroll =

Australian former lightweight rower

Sport
- Country: Australia
- Sport: Rowing
- Club: Mosman Rowing Club
Medal record
Women's rowing
Representing Australia
World Rowing Championships
| Silver medal – second place | 1988 Milan | LW4- |

Justine Carroll (married name: Battersby) is an Australian former lightweight rower. She was a three-time national champion and won a silver medal at the 1988 World Rowing Championships.

== Club and state rowing ==
Carroll's senior club rowing was from the Mosman Rowing Club.

Carroll was first selected for New South Wales at the senior level in 1987 lightweight coxless four which contested the Victoria Cup at the Interstate Regatta. She raced in that event again in 1988 and 1990. In 1988 with Carrol at stroke the New South Wales crossed the line first by a convincing margin but were disqualified due to a doping infringement.

She rowed in Mosman Rowing Club colours contesting Australian national titles in the lightweight pair and the lightweight coxless four on a number of occasions. In 1987 she won the lightweight championships title with Virginia Lee and placed second in the coxless four. In 1988 she again won the pair with Lee and won the national lightweight coxless four title with Lee, Jean Turner and Simone Salier from Mosman. In 1990 she placed third in the pair and second in the four.

== International representative rowing ==
Carroll made her Australian representative debut in the lightweight coxless four at the Milan 1988. Battersby stroked that crew to a silver medal.

== Personal ==
She is married to James Battersby an Australian champion and Olympic rower also from the Mosman Rowing Club. They have three daughters.
