= Terry O'Hanlon =

Australian rowing cox

Edward V O'Hanlon
Personal information
- Education: St Joseph's Hunters Hill
- Occupation: Architect

Sport
- Sport: Rowing
- Club: Mosman Rowing Club

Achievements and titles
- National finals: Victoria Cup 1975; King's Cup 1981, 82, 86

Edward V "Terry" O'Hanlon is an Australian former rowing coxswain. He was seven times an Australian national champion who coxed Australian representative crews at two World Rowing Championships.

== Club and state rowing ==
O'Hanlon was educated at St Joseph's College, Hunters Hill. In his senior year of 1972 he coxed the school's second VIII. His senior club rowing was from the Mosman Rowing Club in Sydney and for a period from the Leichhardt Rowing Club. At the Australian University Championships in 1973, 1974 and 1976 he coxed the Sydney University eight. In 2001 he came out of coxing retirement to steer a UNSW Rowing Club lightweight four at that year's University Championships

O'Hanlon coxed crews at the Australian Rowing Championships every year from 1975 to 1982 and then in 1986. In 1975 he coxed a Mosman pair of John Clark and Michael Crowley to a national title win. The following year he was in the stern of a Mosman coxed four which placed second in their national title attempt. In a rare occurrence, those 1976 Australian Championships also included a men's open eight event and O'Hanlon coxed an all-Mosman eight which took that title. In 1977 and 1978 in Leichhardt Rowing Club colours he coxed Leichhardt senior women's fours at the Australian championships.

In 1979 O'Hanlon was back in the red and white of Mosman and won a national title on the rudder of a men's youth pair of Rod Purnell and Graham Jones. The following year he won a national title in a Mosman men's junior four - a classification of the time for a club four which had not yet won a senior club race.

His final four appearances at the Australian Rowing Championships were in the stern of Mosman or composite selection coxed fours. In 1981 he coxed half of that year's New South Wales men's eight as a Mosman/Balmain composite to victory in the national coxed four championship. Then again in 1982, half of the New South Wales King's Cup eight raced as a Balmain/Sydney composite four with O'Hanlon holding the ropes. In 1986 Mosman men made up half the state eight and they raced in Mosman colours with O'Hanlon steering to second place in the national coxed fours championship. He was again on the rudder in a coxed four title attempt in 1987 in a composite Mosman/Sydney four.

O'Hanlon first made New South Wales state selection in 1975 in the days when the women's lightweight four was coxed . He steered that crew to a win of the Victoria Cup at the 1975 Interstate Regatta. In 1979 though well over youth age himself, he coxed the New South Wales youth eight to victory in the Noel Wilkinson Trophy at the Interstate Regatta. In 1981 and 1982 O'Hanlon was the prominent New South Wales coxswain and was selected in the state men's eights which contested the King's Cup. In 1986 along with the rest of the state champion Mosman four he was back in the New South Wales men's eight which rowed to a second place finish at the 1986 King's Cup.

== International representative rowing ==
In 1975 having won the Australian coxed pair championship, O'Hanlon, John Clark and Michael Crowley were selected to row Australia's coxed pair at the 1975 World Rowing Championships in Nottingham. They were eliminated in the repechage.

By 1977 Stuart Carter was the incumbent coxswain for the Australian and New South Wales eights. Virtually the entire New South Wales King's Cup eight was selected to represent Australia at the 1977 World Rowing Championships but Carter was unavailable and O'Hanlon stepped into the coxswain's seat. They missed the A final and rowed to overall tenth place.

== Personal and professional ==
O'Hanlon studied and qualified as an architect. He is a Director and the principal of QOH Architects, a firm which specialises in large scale campus and community landscape design projects.

O'Hanlon's son Evan O'Hanlon is one of Australia's most successful paralympic athletes. A sprinter who has cerebral palsy, he attended three Paralympic Games and won five gold medals in addition to eight gold medals at five World Para Athletics Championships. O'Hanlon's daughter Elsa was an Australian junior representative rower who won a bronze medal at the 2004 World Junior Rowing Championships. and won a gold medal at the 2006 World University Championships in a lightweight scull. Terry coached Elsa at the Sydney University Boat Club and in the New South Wales state representative lightweight quad scull of 2006.
