= Vallebuona =

Vallebuona is a surname. Notable people with the surname include:

- Duilio Vallebuona (born 1992), Peruvian model
- Giorgio Vallebuona (born 1960), Chilean rower
