= Thierry Louvet =

French rower

Personal information
- Nationality: French
- Born: 10 July 1962 (age 62)

Sport
- Sport: Rowing

Thierry Louvet (born 10 July 1962) is a French rower. He competed in the men's eight event at the 1984 Summer Olympics.
