= Mario Castro (rower) =

Chilean rower (born 1961)

Personal information
- Nationality: Chilean
- Born: 19 July 1961 (age 63)

Sport
- Sport: Rowing

Mario Castro (born 19 July 1961) is a Chilean rower. He competed in the men's eight event at the 1984 Summer Olympics.
