= Andrew Sudduth =

American rower (1961–2006)

Medal record

Men's rowing

Representing the United States

Olympic Games
Silver medal – second place	1984 Los Angeles	Men's eights

World Championships
Silver medal – second place	1981 Munich	Coxed four
Silver medal – second place	1985 Hazewinkel	Single sculls
Bronze medal – third place	1982 Lucerne	Coxed four
Bronze medal – third place	1986 Nottingham	Men's eights

Goodwill Games
Gold medal – first place	1986 Moscow	Men's eights

Andrew Hancock Sudduth (November 21, 1961 – July 15, 2006) was one of the best United States rowers of his generation. He was a fixture on the United States national team throughout the 1980s.

In 1981, Sudduth first represented the United States at the Under 23 World Championships in the men's eight (8+) which finished second. Later that year, he again represented the United States in the World Rowing Championships, where his four-man boat (4+) finished second. Sudduth would go on to represent the United States in the four (4+) at the 1982 and 1983 World Championships, where his boat finished third and seventh, respectively.

After high school, Sudduth had enrolled at Harvard. However, Sudduth was a prankster and ran into disciplinary problems resulting in his suspension from school. Although quite upset at the time, Sudduth later acknowledged that this incident helped him gain focus on both his academic and athletic life.

Following his initial World Championship medal in 1981, Sudduth returned to Harvard to row and study. Sudduth's 1983 Harvard boat, coached by Harry Parker, won the National Collegiate Rowing Championship coming from a boat length down in the last 500 meters of the race to nip the University of Washington at the finish line. Sudduth then took a year off from school to train for the Olympics.

At the 1984 Summer Olympics, Sudduth was part of the United States men's eight which finished second to Canada.

In 1985, Sudduth returned to Harvard, where he led his crew to another National Championship, and then to the Henley Royal Regatta, where they won the Grand Challenge Cup, which is the regatta's international elite race for eights. This is the last time that the Grand Challenge Cup was won by a United States' collegiate team.

That summer, Sudduth would represent the United States in the single scull (1x) at the 1985 World Championships. Sudduth led the race by half a length (approximately one second) over the three-time Olympic champion Pertti Karppinen with 200 meters to go. Just then, Sudduth's oar was knocked out of his hand by a small wave and in one stroke, he lost his advantage over Karppinen. Karppinen, who was famous for his finishing sprint, pushed through for a one length victory over Sudduth. Trailing well back in third place was the five-time world champion and three-time Olympic Silver medalist Peter-Michael Kolbe.

Sudduth led the United States to a bronze medal at the 1986 World Championships in the men's eight and a gold medal at the 1986 Goodwill Games. In 1987, he returned to the single scull, finishing seventh at the World Championships. And in 1988, Sudduth finished sixth at the Seoul Olympics.

Sudduth was also an electrical engineer and in 1988, he was the first to notify the world of the release of the Morris worm.

He died from pancreatic cancer. USRowing posthumously bestowed the Jack Kelly Award on Sudduth, which is given to outstanding rowers who represent the ideals that Jack Kelly exemplified including superior achievement in rowing, service to amateur athletics and success in their chose profession.

== Achievements ==
=== Collegiate ===
- United States National Collegiate Rowing Championship, First Place, 1983, 1985

=== Indoor Rowing ===
- 1985, CRASH-B Sprints World Champion
- 1987, CRASH-B Sprints World Champion
- 1988, CRASH-B Sprints World Champion

=== Goodwill Games ===
- 1986, First Place, Men's Eight
- 1990, Fourth Place, Men's Quadrupule Scull
- 1990, Eighth Place, Men's Double Scull

=== World Rowing Under 23 Championships ===
- 1981, Second Place, Men's Eight

=== World Rowing Championships ===
- 1981, Second Place, Men's Four with Coxswain
- 1982, Third Place, Men's Four with Coxswain
- 1983, Seventh Place, Men's Four with Coxswain
- 1985, Second Place, Men's Single Scull
- 1986, Third Place, Men's Eight
- 1987, Seventh Place, Men's Single Scull

=== Olympics ===
- 1984 Summer Olympics, Silver, Men's Eight
- 1988 Summer Olympics, Sixth Place, Men's Single Scull
