= Rodrigo Abasolo =

Chilean rower (born 1963)

Personal information
- Nationality: Chilean
- Born: 28 May 1963 (age 62)

Sport
- Sport: Rowing

Rodrigo Abasolo (born 28 May 1963) is a Chilean rower. He competed in the men's eight race at the 1984 Summer Olympics.
