= Zibor Llanos =

Chilean rower (born 1955)

Personal information
- Nationality: Chilean
- Born: 8 March 1955 (age 70)

Sport
- Sport: Rowing

Zibor Llanos (born 8 March 1955) is a Chilean rower. He competed in the men's eight event at the 1984 Summer Olympics.
