= Jacques Taborski =

French rower

Personal information
- Nationality: French
- Born: 8 April 1957 (age 67)

Sport
- Sport: Rowing

Jacques Taborski (born 8 April 1957) is a French rower. He competed in the men's eight event at the 1984 Summer Olympics.
