= John Clark (Australian rower) =

Australian rower (born 1948)

Personal information
- Nationality: Australian
- Born: 10 January 1948 (age 78)

Sport
- Sport: Rowing
- Club: Mosman Rowing Club

Achievements and titles
- National finals: King's Cup 1968–72

John Clark (born 10 January 1948) is an Australian former rower. He was a six-time national champion who competed at world championships and in the men's eight event at the 1972 Summer Olympics.

== Club and state rowing ==
John Clark was educated at Sydney Grammar School where he took up rowing. He rowed in the Grammar first VIII in both his senior years of 1964 and 1965. He joined the Mosman Rowing Club straight out of school and his senior club rowing was from Mosman. At Sydney University while studying Agricultural Science he also rowed and was seated at 5 in the Sydney University Boat Club senior eight for the 1967 Intervarsity Championships. the Nepean River.

In Mosman crews Clark contested both the coxed and the coxless four events at the 1970 Australian Rowing Championships and he won the national title in the coxless four. He won both the national coxed pair and the coxless four titles in Mosman crews in 1975 and in 1976 he again contested both the coxed and the coxless four events and won the coxless four national championship. His final year of Sydney club rowing was from the Drummoyne Rowing Club and coached by Rusty Robertson.

He first made state selection for New South Wales in the men's eight which contested and won the 1968 King's Cup at the annual Interstate Regatta. He raced in further New South Wales King's Cup crews in 1969, 1971 and 1972 and saw a second victory in 1972.

== International representative rowing ==
Six members of the New South Wales winning King's Cup eight of 1968 were selected into the Australian eight to contest the 1968 Mexico City Olympics but excluding Clark and John Nickson. However Clark and Nickson were named as reserves close to departure, travelled to Mexico and rowed as a pair in a lead-up race.

The entire New South Wales winning King's Cup eight of 1972 was picked as the Australian eight to compete at the 1972 Munich Olympics. Clark rowed in the six seat of that boat when they rowed to an eighth-place finish in Munich.

In 1975 as the Australian champion coxed pair Clark, Michael Crowley and coxswain Terry O'Hanlon were selected to race Australia's coxed pair at the 1975 World Rowing Championships in Nottingham. They were eliminated in the repechage.

== Coaching ==
After university Clark taught high-school history and science and also coached rowing at Cranbrook School (1976), at St Joseph's College, Hunters Hill (1977–78) and then the Shore School. He. moved to country New South Wales in 1980, to run a pastoral property near Warialda.
