= The Boat Race 1984 =

130th Boat Race
- Date: 18 March 1984
- Winner: Oxford
- Margin of victory: 3 3/4 lengths
- Winning time: 16 minutes 45 seconds
- Overall record (Cambridge–Oxford): 68–61
- Umpire: Mike Sweeney (Cambridge)

Other races
- Reserve winner: Goldie
- Women's winner: Cambridge

The 130th Boat Race took place on 18 March 1984. Held annually, the event is a side-by-side rowing race between crews from the Universities of Oxford and Cambridge along the River Thames. The race was originally scheduled to take place the day before but the Cambridge boat struck a barge before the start and the race was postponed until the following day, making it the first Boat Race to be held on a Sunday. Oxford won by 3 3/4 lengths and both crews beat the existing course record.

Cambridge's Goldie won the reserve race, while Cambridge were victorious in the Women's Boat Race.

== Background ==
The Boat Race is a side-by-side rowing competition between the University of Oxford (sometimes referred to as the "Dark Blues") and the University of Cambridge (sometimes referred to as the "Light Blues"). First held in 1829, the race takes place on the 4.2-mile (6.8 km) Championship Course on the River Thames in southwest London. The rivalry is a major point of honour between the two universities and followed throughout the United Kingdom and broadcast worldwide. Oxford went into the race as reigning champions, having beaten Cambridge by 3 1/4 lengths in the previous year's race. However Cambridge held the overall lead, with 68 victories to Oxford's 60 (excluding the "dead heat" of 1877).

Originally scheduled to take place on Saturday 17 March, the Cambridge cox, Peter Hobson, steered their boat into a moored barge during the warmup, destroying the bow. The crew paddled to the side of the river where most were able to disembark, but some were forced to swim to safety. The race was postponed to the following day where Cambridge competed in a boat borrowed from the Amateur Rowing Association. It was the first Boat Race to be held on a Sunday in the history of the competition. The disagreement over the inclusion of Boris Rankov in Oxford's crew for the sixth time in the previous year's race had not been resolved. Rankov, however, had left the university after completing his studies so the dispute would have no impact on this year's race.

The first Women's Boat Race took place in 1927, but did not become an annual fixture until the 1960s. Until 2014, the contest was conducted as part of the Henley Boat Races, but as of the 2015 race, it is held on the River Thames, on the same day as the men's main and reserve races. The reserve race, contested between Oxford's Isis boat and Cambridge's Goldie boat has been held since 1965. It usually takes place on the Tideway, prior to the main Boat Race.

== Crews ==
Oxford were pre-race favourites and their crew were an average of 11 pounds (5.0 kg) heavier than their Cambridge opponents. The race saw the return of five Blues for Oxford and four for Cambridge. Oxford's crew contained two Canadian brothers (the Evans twins, Mark and Michael), two Australians and an American cox, while Cambridge's predominantly British crew was completed by a Canadian and an American.

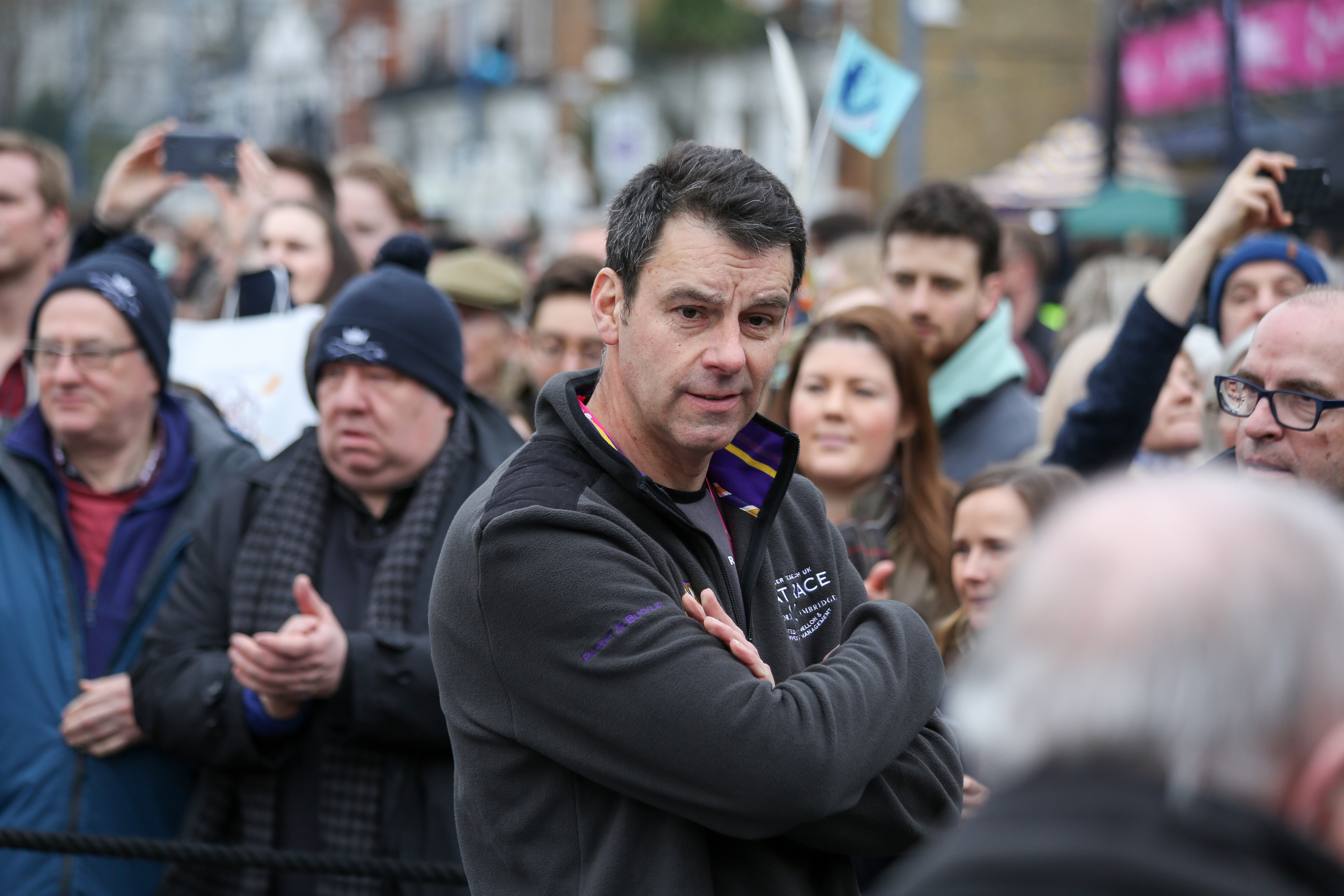
John Garrett (pictured in 2018) rowed at number 5 for Cambridge.

Seat	Oxford				Cambridge			
Seat	Name	Nationality	College	Weight	Name	Nationality	College	Weight
Bow	R C Clay	British	New College	13 st 0 lb	A H Reynolds	British	Pembroke	12 st 2 lb
2	C L B Long	British	Oriel	12 st 4 lb	A R Knight	British	Clare	12 st 5 lb
3	J A G H Stewart	British	Pembroke	14 st 7 lb	S W Berger (P)	American	1st & 3rd Trinity	14 st 10.5 lb
4	D M Rose	Australian	Balliol	15 st 2.5 lb	G A D Barnard	Canadian	Robinson	12 st 11 lb
5	J M Evans	Canadian	University	14 st 5 lb	J L D Garrett	British	Lady Margaret Boat Club	14 st 4 lb
6	G R D Jones (P)	Australian	New College	14 st 0.5 lb	J M Pritchard	British	Robinson	13 st 9 lb
7	W J Lang	British	Magdalen	14 st 0.5 lb	E M G Pearson	British	Jesus	12 st 5 lb
Stroke	W M Evans	Canadian	University	13 st 10 lb	J D Kinsella	British	St Catharine's	12 st 11 lb
Cox	S R Lesser	American	Magdalen	8 st 1 lb	P M Hobson	British	Christ's	7 st 5 lb
Source: (P) – boat club president

== Race ==
The Championship Course along which the Boat Race is contested

Oxford started from the Surrey station and despite rating higher, were slightly behind Cambridge after a minute. Aggressive steering from Hobson resulted in warnings from umpire Mike Sweeney, and by the mile post, Oxford held a two-second lead. A push by Oxford at Harrods saw them five seconds clear by Hammersmith Bridge and two lengths clear by Chiswick Steps. Nine seconds ahead by Barnes Bridge, Oxford passed the finishing post officially 12 seconds and 3 3/4 lengths ahead of Cambridge, in a time of 16 minutes 45 seconds, beating the previous best of 16 minutes 58 seconds recorded by Oxford in the 1976 race. This was Oxford's ninth consecutive victory, and their tenth in eleven years, and took the overall record to 68–61 in favour of Cambridge.

In the reserve race, Cambridge's Goldie beat Oxford's Isis by 2 3/4 lengths, while Cambridge won the 39th Women's Boat Race.

== Reaction ==
Cambridge cox Hobson reacted to the pre-race crash: "It was the worst nightmare in the world coming true." Regarding the race, the Cambridge number 5, John Garrett stated "the borrowed boat was better than ours but we weren't used to it." Oxford cox Seth Lesser said he was aware that his crew were setting a record-breaking pace: "I knew the record was on ... We made another burn at St Paul's School just to make sure."

As a result of Saturday's collision and the associated publicity, Sunday's race was viewed on British television by more than 12 million people.
