= Carlos Neyra =

Chilean rower (born 1960)

Personal information
- Nationality: Chilean
- Born: 9 June 1960 (age 66)

Sport
- Sport: Rowing

Carlos Neyra (born 9 June 1960) is a Chilean rower. He competed in the men's eight event at the 1984 Summer Olympics.
