= Dean Crawford =

Canadian rower (1958–2023)

Personal information
- National team: Canadian rowing eights
- Born: February 28, 1958; Victoria, British Columbia
- Died: December 6, 2023
- Education: University of Victoria
- Spouse: Belinda Macey

Olympic medal record

Men's rowing

Representing Canada
Gold medal – first place	1984 Los Angeles	Eight

Dean Crawford (February 28, 1958 – December 6, 2023) was a Canadian rower and sports administrator. He began rowing in 1978 and won a gold medal at the 1984 Summer Olympics in the men's rowing eights event. He was also involved with sports as an administrator serving as the president of SwimBC, Swimming Canada, and Pacific Coast Swimming.

== Biography ==
Crawford was born in Victoria, British Columbia on February 28, 1958, to Nora Mary (née Trimble) and Gerry Crawford. He completed his high school from Spectrum Community School, in Saanich, before joining University of Victoria (UVic) for a degree in Computer Science and Economics.

At UVic, Crawford was introduced to rowing as a sport as a first year student, when he happened across a rowing shell outside the students' union building. He had no prior experience with the sport. The university team practiced at Elk Lake. The boathouse and facilities were noted to have been quite elementary with the university's boathouse being a plywood shack. During his time at the university, he was a member of the team coached by AI Morrow. In addition to Crawford, two other members of the university team Kevin Neufeld and Grant Main made it to the 1984 Summer Olympics in Los Angeles.

As a member of the Canadian rowing eights team at the 1984 Olympics at Lake Casitas outside of Los Angeles, he helped the team win the gold-medal, defeating teams including the United States team which was the home-team, with a victory margin of 0.42 seconds. He rowed at the number 7 position on the boat and it was noted that he blacked out as the team crossed the finish line. The medal was the country's first in rowing at the Olympics since 1964. Crawford had earlier made a debut with the national team in 1982 and had represented the country in the 1983 World Championships. He also represented the country in the 1985 World Rowing Championships in Belgium. He was named UVic's 1985 male athlete of the year.

Crawford worked in the information technology field after his rowing career. He also served as an administrator with various sporting bodies including serving as the president of SwimBC, Swimming Canada, and Pacific Coast Swimming. He also had an unsuccessful campaign to serve on the Victoria School Board. He and the members of the national rowing team were inducted into the BC Sports Hall of Fame in 1985, Canadian Olympic Hall of Fame in 2003, and Canadian Rowing Hall of Fame in 2019, while he and his 1983 university team were inducted to the UVic Sports Hall of Fame in 2009.

Crawford married Belinda Macey in 2000. The couple had a daughter. Crawford had two children, a daughter and a son, from a prior marriage. Crawford died on December 6, 2023.
