= Alain Duprat =

French rower

Personal information
- Nationality: French
- Born: 4 April 1939 (age 87)

Sport
- Sport: Rowing

Alain Duprat (born 4 April 1939) is a French rower. He competed in the men's eight event at the 1984 Summer Olympics.
