= Rodolfo Pereira =

Chilean rower (born 1959)

Personal information
- Nationality: Chilean
- Born: 20 September 1959 (age 65)

Sport
- Sport: Rowing

Rodolfo Pereira (born 20 September 1959) is a Chilean rower. He competed in the men's eight event at the 1984 Summer Olympics.
