= Bernard Chevalier =

French rower

Personal information
- Nationality: French
- Born: 9 March 1959 (age 66)

Sport
- Sport: Rowing

Bernard Chevalier (born 9 March 1959) is a French rower. He competed in the men's eight event at the 1984 Summer Olympics.
