= Ion Popa (rower) =

Australian rower

Personal information
- Born: 2 February 1957 (age 69) Romania
- Height: 187 cm (6 ft 2 in)
- Weight: 86 kg (190 lb)
- Spouse: Susan Chapman
- Relatives: Rosemary Popa (daughter)
- Edward Popa(son)

Sport
- Sport: Rowing
- Event: Eight
Medal record
Men's rowing
Representing Australia
Olympic Games
Bronze medal – third place	1984 Los Angeles	Eight
World Rowing Championships
Gold medal – first place	1986 Nottingham	Eight
Bronze medal – third place	1983 Duisburg	Eight
Commonwealth Games
Gold medal – first place	1986 Edinburgh	Eight
- Updated on 13 September 2015

Ion Popa (born 2 February 1957) is a Romanian-born, former Australian representative rower – a national champion, world champion, dual Olympian and Olympic medal winner.

== Personal ==
Born in Romania, Popa rowed for his country of birth and was a member of the Romanian police force prior to his 1978 defection to Australia. In 1984 he married fellow Australian Olympic rower, Susan Chapman. Their daughter Rosemary Popa (born 1991) is an Australian national champion rower. A dual American-Australian citizen, Rosemary has represented both the USA and Australia at World Rowing Championships.

In 2010 Popa was inducted as a member of the Rowing Victoria Hall of Fame.

== Club and state rowing ==
His senior rowing in Australia was initially with the Mercantile Rowing Club in Melbourne from 1979, and then since 1983 with the Banks Rowing Club where he has been a long-time committee man.

Popa was selected in Victorian state representative King's Cup crews contesting the men's Interstate Eight-Oared Championship at the Australian Rowing Championships. He stroked the eight in 1981 and 1982 and was in the seven seat in 1984, 1986, 1988 and 1991. Those Victorian crews were victorious in 1986, 1988 and 1991.

== International representative rowing ==
Popa raced for Romania at the 1977 World Rowing Championships in a coxless four.

Popa competed for Australia at the 1983 World Rowing Championships in the men's eight who took the bronze medal. At the 1984 Los Angeles Olympics Popa rowed at seven in the Australian men's VIII who took the bronze medal.

At the 1986 World Rowing Championships in Nottingham, England Popa was in the seven seat of the victorious Australian men's eight. It was Australia's first and only World Champion title in the men's eight. That same year at the 1986 Commonwealth Games in Edinburgh, Popa won gold in the Australian men's eight.

Popa was again at seven in the Australian men's eight which finished in fifth place at the 1988 Summer Olympics in Seoul.
