= Chip Lubsen =

American rower (born 1955)

Personal information
- Born: July 13, 1955 (age 70) Alexandria, Virginia, U.S.
Medal record
Men's rowing
Representing the United States
Olympic Games
Silver medal – second place	1984 Los Angeles	Eights

Walter Harry "Chip" Lubsen, Jr. (born July 13, 1955) is an American former competitive rower and Olympic silver medalist. He was a member of Cornell University's varsity heavyweight eight boat that won the IRA championship in 1977.

== Olympian ==
Lubsen participated in the men's eights at the 1976 Summer Olympics and placed 9th overall. He qualified for the 1980 U.S. Olympic team but was unable to compete due to the 1980 Summer Olympics boycott. Lubsen did however receive one of 461 Congressional Gold Medals created especially for the spurned athletes. He was a member of the American men's eights team that won the silver medal at the 1984 Summer Olympics in Los Angeles, California.
