= Charles Clapp (rower) =

American rower (born 1959)

Personal information
- Full name: Charles Elmer Clapp III
- Born: January 1, 1959 (age 67) Providence, Rhode Island, U.S.
Medal record
Men's rowing
Representing the United States
World Rowing Championships
Bronze medal – third place	1981 Oberschleißheim	Men's eights
Olympic Games
Silver medal – second place	1984 Los Angeles	Men's eights

Charles Elmer Clapp III (born January 1, 1959) is an American rower who competed as a collegiate rower at the University of Washington (class of 1981), in the men's eight at the 1981 World Rowing Championships (winning a bronze medal), and at the 1984 Summer Olympics. He won the silver medal in the Men's eights event.

He was born in Providence, Rhode Island and is the brother to six other siblings including rower Gene Clapp.
