= John Terwilliger =

American rower (born 1957)

Personal information
- Born: December 14, 1957 (age 68) Albuquerque, New Mexico, U.S.
Medal record
Men's rowing
Representing the United States
Olympic Games
Silver medal – second place	1984 Los Angeles	Eights

John Richard Terwilliger (born December 14, 1957) is an American former competitive rower and Olympic silver medalist.

== Olympian ==
Terwilliger qualified for the 1980 U.S. Olympic team but was unable to compete due to the 1980 Summer Olympics boycott. In 2007, he received one of 461 Congressional Gold Medals created especially for the spurned athletes. He was a member of the American men's eights team that won the silver medal at the 1984 Summer Olympics in Los Angeles, California. Terwilliger also participated in the men's coxed fours at the 1988 Summer Olympics and placed 5th overall. He spent his college career rowing for Seattle Pacific University, where he was a member of that school's first crew to participate in a national regatta, the Dad Vail.
