= Marcelo Rojas =

Chilean rower (born 1963)

Personal information
- Nationality: Chilean
- Born: 23 April 1963 (age 62)

Sport
- Sport: Rowing

Marcelo Rojas (born 23 April 1963) is a Chilean rower. He competed at the 1984 Summer Olympics and the 1988 Summer Olympics. Campeón Nacional de Remo de Chile, embarcación, año, ciudad. Campeón sudamericano de Remo, embarcación, año, ciudad.
