= Fred Borchelt =

American rower

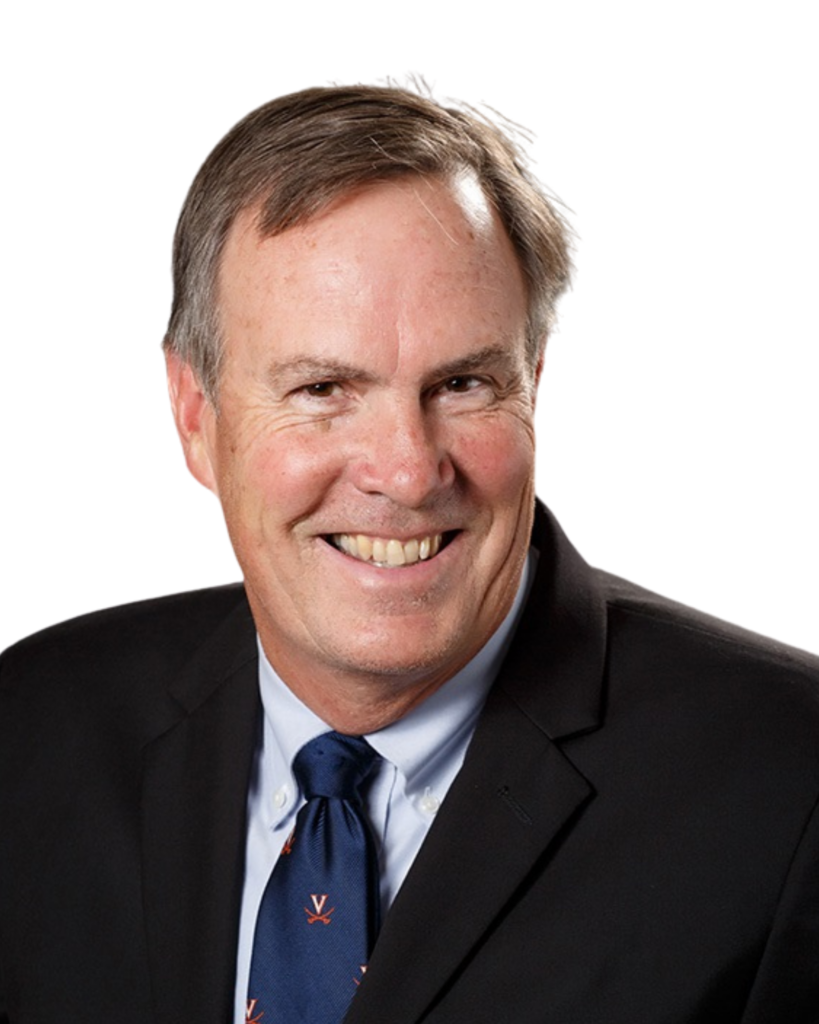

Personal information
- Full name: Earl Frederick Borchelt
- Born: June 12, 1954 (age 72) Staten Island, New York, U.S.
Medal record
Men's rowing
Representing the United States
Olympic Games
Silver medal – second place	1984 Los Angeles	Men's eights
World Championships
Silver medal – second place	1981 Münich	M4+
Bronze medal – third place	1979 Bled	M2+
Bronze medal – third place	1982 Lucerne	M4+

Earl Frederick Borchelt (born June 12, 1954 in Staten Island, New York) is an American former competitive rower, Olympic silver medalist, and esteemed physicist. He was a member of the American men's eights team that won the silver medal at the 1984 Summer Olympics in Los Angeles, California. Borchelt also participated in the men's coxed fours at the 1976 Summer Olympics and placed 11th overall.

In 2007, Borchelt was awarded the Congressional Gold Medal, the highest award given to civilians by the U.S. legislative branch. The entire American team that was supposed to compete at the 1980 Summer Olympics was awarded the medals because of the 1980 Summer Olympics boycott. In the words of Borchelt, "It took me a while to forgive President Carter for the boycott, but I have since come to terms with his decision."

Fred Borchelt is a member of the Alexandria City High School Athletic Hall of Fame and is a Rutgers University alumnus. He has worked as a patent examiner for the United States Patent and Trademark Office and as the varsity crew coach at St. John's High School in Shrewsbury, MA. As of 2023, Borchelt resides in Sterling, Massachusetts and continues to teach all levels of high school physics at St. John's High School in Shrewsbury, MA.
