= Chris Penny (rower) =

American rower (born 1962)

Personal information
- Full name: Christopher Gore Penny
- Born: May 4, 1962 (age 64) Morristown, New Jersey, U.S.
Medal record
Men's rowing
Representing the United States
Olympic Games
Silver medal – second place	1984 Los Angeles	Men's eight

Christopher Gore Penny (born May 4, 1962) is an American former competitive rower and Olympic silver medalist. He was a member of the American men's eights team that won the silver medal at the 1984 Summer Olympics in Los Angeles, California.

A 1985 graduate of Princeton University, Penny studied at St John's College, Oxford, and took part in The Boat Race in 1988 after being left off the squad in 1987 when he, three other American oarsmen, and an American coxswain protested Oxford coach Daniel Topolski's training regimen (an incident known as "The Oxford Boat Race Mutiny").

== See also ==
- List of Princeton University Olympians
- True Blue: The Oxford Boat Race Mutiny
