= Giorgio Vallebuona =

Chilean rower (born 1960)

Personal information
- Nationality: Chilean
- Born: 24 April 1960 (age 65)

Sport
- Sport: Rowing

Giorgio Vallebuona (born 24 April 1960) is a Chilean rower. He competed in the men's eight event at the 1984 Summer Olympics.
