= Bob Jaugstetter =

American rower (born 1948)

Personal information
- Born: June 15, 1948 (age 78) Savannah, Georgia, U.S.
Medal record
Men's rowing
Representing the United States
Olympic Games
Silver medal – second place	1984 Los Angeles	Men's eights

Robert C. "Bob" Jaugstetter (born June 15, 1948) is an American former competitive coxswain on U.S. National Crews and U.S. Olympic Crews.

== Education ==
Jaugstetter is a 1970 graduate of Saint Joseph's University.

== Olympics ==
Jaugstetter qualified for the 1980 U.S. Olympic team but was not able to compete due to the U.S. Olympic Committee's boycott of the 1980 Summer Olympics in Moscow, Russia. He was one of 461 athletes to receive a Congressional Gold Medal many years later. He was a member of the American men's eights team that won silver medal at the 1984 Summer Olympics in Los Angeles, California.

== Coaching career ==
- St Joseph Prep School
- Wichita State University
- Northeastern University
- Tulane University
