= Bruce Ibbetson =

American rower (born 1953)

Personal information
- Born: January 13, 1953 (age 73) Hollywood, Los Angeles, U.S.
Medal record
Men's rowing
Representing the United States
Olympic Games
Silver medal – second place	1984 Los Angeles	Eights

Bruce Bernard Ibbetson (born January 13, 1953) is a former American competitive rower and Olympic silver medalist.

== Education ==
Bruce is a 1975 graduate of the University of California, Irvine.

== Olympics ==
Ibbetson qualified for the 1980 U.S. Olympic team but was not able to compete due to the U.S. Olympic Committee's boycott of the 1980 Summer Olympics in Moscow, Russia. He was one of 461 athletes to receive a Congressional Gold Medal many years later. He was a member of the American men's eights team that won the silver medal at the 1984 Summer Olympics in Los Angeles, California.
