= Alejandro Rojas =

Chilean rower (born 1962)

Personal information
- Nationality: Chilean
- Born: 6 January 1962 (age 63)

Sport
- Sport: Rowing

Alejandro Rojas (born 6 January 1962) is a Chilean rower. He competed at the 1984 Summer Olympics and the 1988 Summer Olympics.
