= Tom Darling =

American rower (born 1958)

Personal information
- Full name: Thomas Ward Darling
- Born: May 4, 1958 (age 68)
Medal record
Men's rowing
Representing the United States
Olympic Games
Silver medal – second place	1984 Los Angeles	Men's eights

Thomas Ward Darling (born May 4, 1958) is an American former competitive rower and Olympic silver medalist. A 1981 graduate of Syracuse University, he was a member of the American men's eights team that won the silver medal at the 1984 Summer Olympics in Los Angeles, California. Darling also participated in the men's coxed fours at the 1988 Summer Olympics and placed 5th overall.

2013 Winner of World Indoor Rowing Championship Age 50–54.

2014 Winner of World Indoor Rowing Championship Age 55–59.

2019 Winner C.R.A.S.H.-B. Indoor Rowing Championship Age 60–64. Setting the world record for this age group.
