= Blair Horn =

Canadian rower (born 1961)

Personal information
- Full name: Blair James H. Horn
- Born: July 17, 1961 (age 64) Kelowna, British Columbia, Canada
- Education: University of Washington; Osgoode Hall Law School
- Height: 6 ft 2 1/2 in (189 cm)
- Weight: 192 lb (87 kg)

Sport
- Sport: Rowing
Medal record
Men's rowing
Representing Canada
Olympic Games
Gold medal – first place	1984 Los Angeles	Eight
- Updated on 4 July 2015

Blair Horn (born July 17, 1961) is a Canadian former rower, who was a member of the Canadian men's eights team that won the gold medal at the 1984 Summer Olympics in Los Angeles, California.

Born in Kelowna, British Columbia, Horn is a graduate of Brentwood College School in Mill Bay, British Columbia. A 1983 graduate of the University of Washington with a B.B.A. in 1984, he was also part of their rowing squad.

Horn was later admitted to Osgoode Hall Law School where he graduated with an LL.B. in 1987. He went on to practice law at Fasken Martineau DuMoulin.
