= Paul Steele =

Canadian rower (born 1957)

Medal record

Men's rowing

Representing Canada

Olympic Games
Gold medal – first place	1984 Los Angeles	Eight

Paul Steele (born December 5, 1957, in New Westminster, British Columbia) is a Canadian international rower, who was a member of the Canadian men's eights team that won the gold medal at the 1984 Summer Olympics in Los Angeles, California, United States. The rowing team was inducted into the BC Sports Hall of Fame in 1985, and the Canadian Olympic Hall of Fame in 2003.

He was also a member of the Canadian men's eight rowing team for the 1988 Summer Olympics in Seoul, South Korea. They placed 6th in the finals.
