= The Boat Race 1983 =

129th Boat Race
- Date: 2 April 1983
- Winner: Oxford
- Margin of victory: 4 1/2 lengths
- Winning time: 19 minutes 7 seconds
- Overall record (Cambridge–Oxford): 68–60

Other races
- Reserve winner: Isis
- Women's winner: Cambridge

The 129th Boat Race took place on 2 April 1983. Held annually, the event is a side-by-side rowing race between crews from the Universities of Oxford and Cambridge along the River Thames. The pre-race preparation saw Cambridge threaten to boycott the race for the first time, following the inclusion of Boris Rankov in the Oxford boat. The crews were the two heaviest in the history of the event, and featured ten former Boat Race competitors. Oxford won the race by 4 1/2 lengths.

Isis won the reserve race, while Cambridge were victorious in the Women's Boat Race.

== Background ==
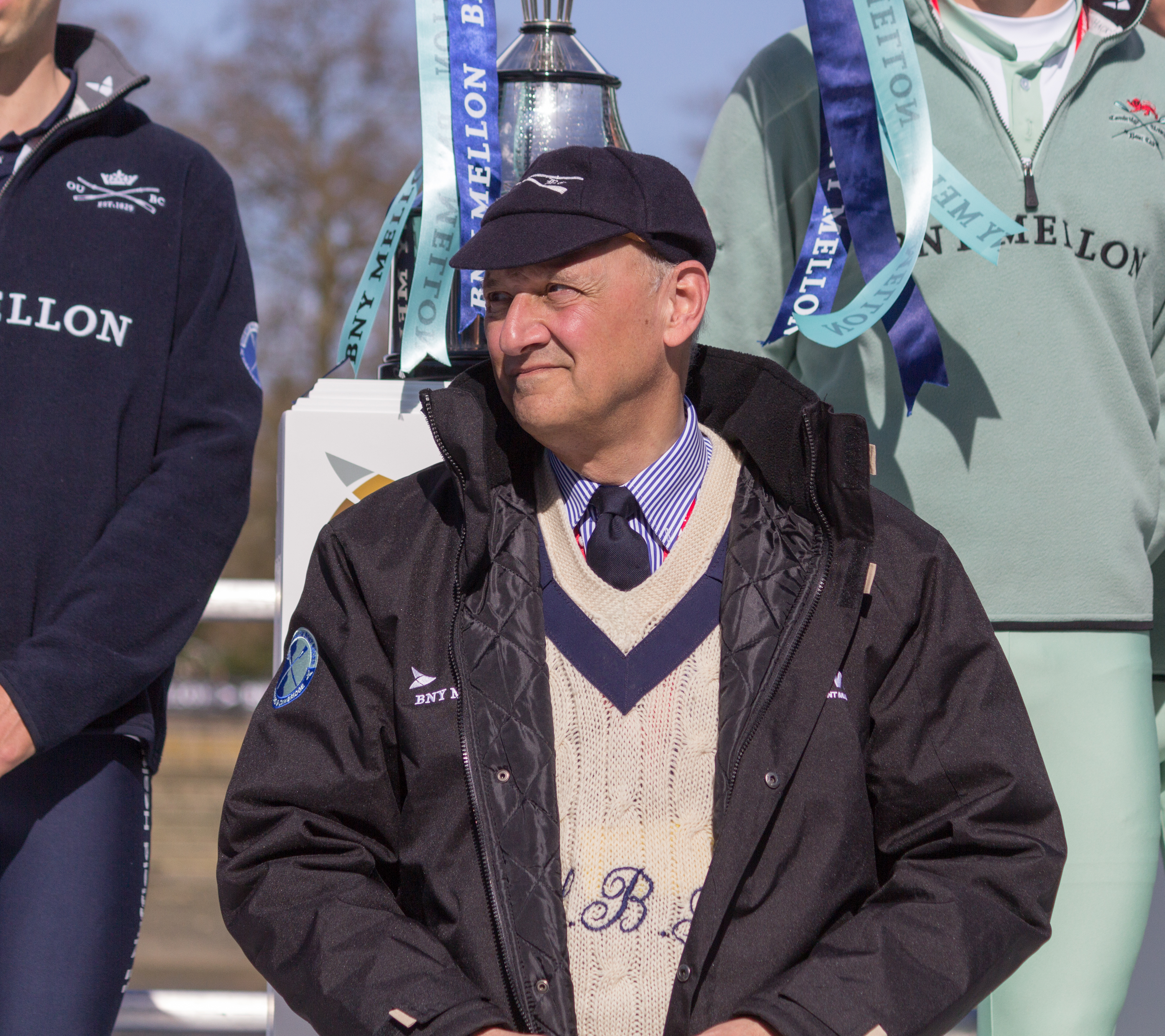
The inclusion of Boris Rankov (pictured in 2015) in Oxford's crew was controversial.

The Boat Race is a side-by-side rowing competition between the University of Oxford (sometimes referred to as the "Dark Blues") and the University of Cambridge (sometimes referred to as the "Light Blues"). First held in 1829, the race takes place on the 4.2 miles (6.8 km) Championship Course on the River Thames in southwest London. The rivalry is a major point of honour between the two universities and followed throughout the United Kingdom and broadcast worldwide. Oxford were the reigning champions, having beaten Cambridge by 3 1/4 lengths in the previous year's race. However, Cambridge held the overall lead, with 68 victories to Oxford's 59 (excluding the "dead heat" of 1877). The race was sponsored by Ladbrokes; the winner was awarded the Ladbrokes Trophy.

On 7 March 1983, Cambridge issued a statement suggesting that they might boycott the race following a dispute over Oxford's selection of Boris Rankov as a member of their crew. Veteran of the previous five Boat Races, all of which were Dark Blue victories, Cambridge argued Rankov was ineligible for inclusion as he was a lecturer at the university. Coach David Townsend of the University of London offered the services of his crew to provide an opponent for Oxford, should Cambridge refuse to participate. Rankov himself had offered to withdraw from the race, but the Dark Blues' committee rejected this. Cambridge finally agreed to race after they reached an agreement with Oxford to discuss and possibly tighten the eligibility criteria. This ultimately led to establishment of the so-called "Rankov Rule", which states that oarsmen will compete in the race no more than four times as an undergraduate and no more than four times as a graduate.

The first Women's Boat Race took place in 1927, but did not become an annual fixture until the 1960s. Up until 2014, the contest was conducted as part of the Henley Boat Races, but as of the 2015 race, it is held on the River Thames, on the same day as the men's main and reserve races. The reserve race, contested between Oxford's Isis boat and Cambridge's Goldie boat has been held since 1965. It usually takes place on the Tideway, prior to the main Boat Race.

== Crews ==
The two crews were the heaviest in Boat Race history, Oxford averaging 14 stone 8 lbs (92.3 kg) per rower, nearly 7 pounds (3.2 kg) a man heavier than the Cambridge crew, and were pre-race favourites to win an eighth consecutive race. Cambridge's crew featured six unsuccessful Blues, while Oxford's boat contained four Blues with ten Boat Race victories between them. While seven of the Oxford rowers were international post-graduates, Cambridge's crew included seven undergraduates. The average age of the Oxford crew was 25, four years more than Cambridge.

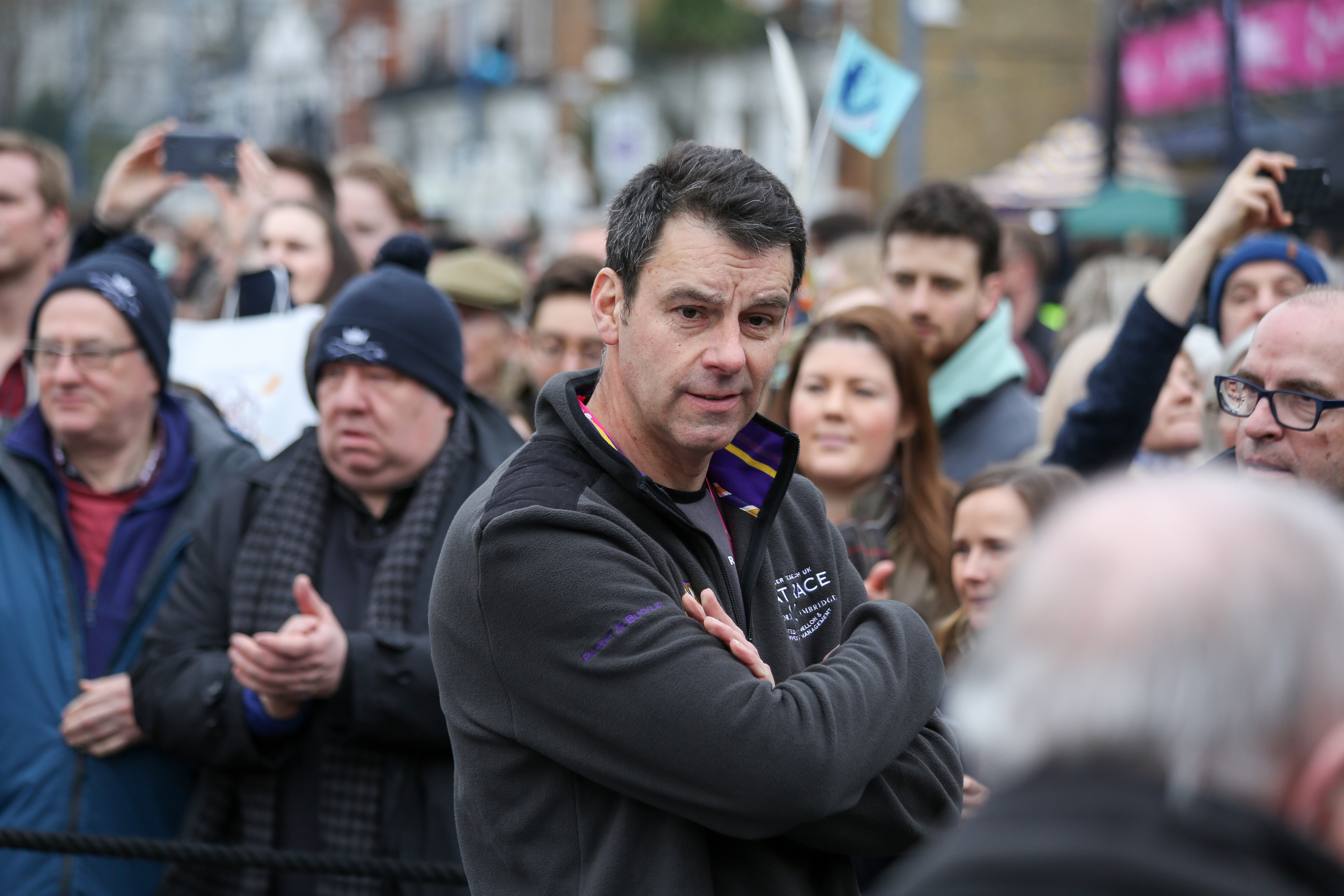
John Garrett (pictured in 2018) rowed at number 7 for Cambridge.

Seat	Oxford			Cambridge		
Seat	Name	College	Weight	Name	College	Weight
Bow	W J Lang	Magdalen	14 st 13 lb	E M G Pearson	Jesus	12 st 10 lb
2	H E Clay	Magdalen	14 st 6 lb	A R Knight	Clare	12 st 9 lb
3	R P Yonge	New College	14 st 8 lb	B M Philp	Downing	15 st 5 lb
4	G R D Jones	New College	14 st 5 lb	C D Heard	Lady Margaret Boat Club	15 st 7 lb
5	N B Rankov	St Hugh's	15 st 5 lb	S W Berger	1st & 3rd Trinity	15 st 5 lb
6	J M Evans	University	14 st 6 lb	P R W Sheppard	Lady Margaret Boat Club	15 st 11 lb
7	W M Evans	University	14 st 6 lb	J L Garrett	Lady Margaret Boat Club	14 st 7 lb
Stroke	J L Bland	Merton	14 st 4 lb	S A Harris	Queens'	?
Cox	S E Higgins	Exeter	8 st 0 lb	I Bernstein	Emmanuel	7 st 10 lb

== Race ==
The Championship Course along which the Boat Race is contested

Cambridge won the toss and elected to start from the Surrey station. Oxford, rowing at a higher rate, took an early lead and were clear of Cambridge by the Mile Post. Extending their lead to six seconds by Hammersmith Bridge, Oxford pushed on to lead by nine seconds at Chiswick Steps. Despite trying to keep in touch, Cambridge were four lengths behind at Barnes Bridge and trailed by 13 seconds as Oxford passed the finishing post. Oxford won by 4 1/2 lengths in a time of 19 minutes 7 seconds.

This was Oxford's eighth consecutive victory, and their ninth in ten years, and took the overall record to 68–60 in favour of Cambridge. The race was watched by 14 million television viewers.

In the reserve race, Oxford's Isis beat Cambridge's Goldie by 6 1/2 lengths, while Cambridge won the 38th Women's Boat Race.
