= Pat Turner (rower) =

Canadian rower (born 1961)

Medal record

Men's rowing

Representing Canada

Olympic Games
Gold medal – first place	1984 Los Angeles	Eight

Patrick "Pat" Turner (born March 24, 1961, in Toronto, Ontario) is a Canadian rower, who was a member of the Canadian men's eights team that won the gold medal at the 1984 Summer Olympics in Los Angeles, California. The rowing team was inducted into the BC Sports Hall of Fame in 1985, and the Canadian Olympic Hall of Fame in 2003.

== Personal life ==
After the Olympics, Turner worked as an emergency doctor at the University Hospital of Northern British Columbia before moving to Prince George, British Columbia in 2003.

Turner's older brother Tim is also an Olympian. He competed in the coxless fours event during the 1984 Olympics.
