= Brian McMahon (rowing) =

Canadian rower (born 1961)

Personal information
- Born: July 24, 1961 (age 65) Toronto, Ontario, Canada
Medal record
Men's rowing
Representing Canada
| Gold medal – first place | 1984 Los Angeles | Eight |

Brian McMahon (born July 24, 1961) is a Canadian rower, who was the coxswain of the Canadian men's eights team that won the gold medal at the 1984 Summer Olympics in Los Angeles, California. The rowing team was inducted into the BC Sports Hall of Fame in 1985, and the Canadian Olympic Hall of Fame in 2003.
