= Grant Main =

Canadian rower

Medal record

Men's rowing

Representing Canada

Olympic Games
Gold medal – first place	1984 Los Angeles	Eight

Grant Main (born February 11, 1960, in Victoria, British Columbia) is a Canadian rower, who was a member of the Canadian men's eights team that won the gold medal at the 1984 Summer Olympics in Los Angeles, California. He also competed at the 1988 Summer Olympics. From March 2014, Main served as the Deputy Minister of the British Columbia Ministry of Transportation until his retirement in November 2020.
