= Kevin Neufeld =

Canadian rower (1960–2022)

Medal record

Men's rowing

Representing Canada

Olympic Games
Gold medal – first place	1984 Los Angeles	Eight

Kevin Neufeld (November 6, 1960 in St. Catharines, Ontario – February 26, 2022) was a Canadian rower, who was a member of the Canadian men's eights team that won the gold medal at the 1984 Summer Olympics in Los Angeles, California. He had previously won a gold medal in the eights at the world championships in 1983, and subsequently won a gold medal in the coxless four at the 1986 Commonwealth Games at Strathclyde Country Park. He died on February 26, 2022.
