= Mark Evans (rower) =

Canadian rower (born 1957)

Personal information
- Born: August 16, 1957 (age 69) Toronto, Ontario, Canada
- Education: University College, Oxford
Medal record
Men's rowing
Representing Canada
Olympic Games
Gold medal – first place	1984 Los Angeles	Eight

William Marcus "Mark" Evans (born August 16, 1957) is a former rower from Canada.

== Biography ==
Evans was a member of the Canadian men's eights team that won the gold medal at the 1984 Summer Olympics in Los Angeles, USA. His twin brother Michael was on the same winning team. The rowing team was inducted into the BC Sports Hall of Fame in 1985, and the Canadian Olympic Hall of Fame in 2003.

Both brothers had studied at University College, Oxford, where they were part of the winning Oxford crews in the 1983 and 1984 Oxford Cambridge Boat Race.
