= Stephen Evans (rower) =

Australian rower

Steve Evans OAM
Personal information
- Full name: Stephen Frederick Evans
- Born: 24 September 1962 (age 63) Sydney, Australia
- Years active: 1980–1988

Sport
- Sport: Rowing
- Club: Mosman Rowing Club
Medal record
Men's rowing
Representing Australia
Olympic Games
Bronze medal – third place	1984 Los Angeles	Eight
World Rowing Championships
Gold medal – first place	1986 Nottingham	M8+
Commonwealth Games
Gold medal – first place	1986 Edinburgh	Eight

Stephen Frederick Evans (born 24 September 1962, in Sydney) is an Australian former national champion, world champion, dual Olympian and Olympic medal winning rower.

== Club and state rowing ==
He was born in Sydney and his senior rowing was with the Mosman Rowing Club where his father Bruce Evans was an accomplished coach.

Evans was first selected to represent New South Wales in the 1979 Trans Tasman Colts Series – a series of three match races between New Zealand and Australian U23 crews. Evans stroked a New South Wales lightweight four who lost all three races. Evans was selected to represent New South Wales in the men's Interstate Youth Eight Championship contesting the Noel F Wilkinson Trophy at the 1981 Australian Rowing Championships. In 1982 he was again selected in the New South Wales youth eight and stroked that crew to victory.

In 1983 Evans competed at the National Regatta in Mosman colours in a composite coxless four. He was selected and trained in the New South Wales King's Cup eight but pulled out on the day due to injury. In 1984 at the Australian Championships he stroked the New South Wales King's Cup crew to victory in the men's Interstate Eight-Oared Championship. He again stroked the New South Wales King's Cup eight in 1985, 1986, 1987 and 1988.

Evans won Australian national titles at the Australian Rowing Championships in 1985 in a coxed four; in 1986 in a coxed pair (in Mosman colours with Craig Muller); and competed and placed in pairs and fours in 1987 and 1988.

== International representative rowing ==
Evans first donned Australian colours as a ten year old coxswain steering an Australian women's coxed four in the first of a three race in Inter Dominion series against New Zealand in 1973. Evans' father Bruce coached the Australian women's four.

Evans' first senior call up for Australia was to the Olympic squad for Los Angeles 1984. The selected Australian eight was built around the national champion Mosman Rowing Club coxed four that included Evans, Muller and Jim Battersby . Evans stroked the Australian eight to third place in the final winning bronze behind Canada and the USA.

His first World Championship national representation was at the 1986 World Rowing Championships in Nottingham, England where stroked the Australian men's eight to victory. It was Australia's first and only World Championship title in the men's VIII. That same year at the 1986 Commonwealth Games in Edinburgh, that same crew with Evans at stroke won gold in the Australian men's VIII.

At the 1987 World Rowing Championships in Copenhagen Evans stroked the Australian eight to a fourth place and he held his seat and role for the men's eight for the 1988 Summer Olympics in Seoul. That crew placed fifth.
