= James Battersby =

Australian rower

Jim Battersby
Personal information
- Full name: James Stewart Battersby
- Born: 5 November 1958 (age 67)

Sport
- Club: Mosman Rowing Club
Medal record
Men's rowing
Representing Australia
Olympic Games
Bronze medal – third place	1984 Los Angeles	Eight
World Championships
Bronze medal – third place	1983 Duisburg	Eight

James Stewart Battersby (born 5 November 1958) is an Australian former national champion and Olympic level rower.

== Club and state rowing ==
His senior rowing was with the Mosman Rowing Club in Sydney.

Battersby was first selected to represent New South Wales in the 1978 youth eight contesting the Noel F Wilkinson Trophy at the Interstate Regatta within the Australian Rowing Championships. He was then selected in the New South Wales U23 squad who contested a 1979 Trans Tasman series against New Zealand. In 1981 Battersby was selected in the New South Wales senior men's eight who contested the King's Cup at the Interstate Regatta. He made further King's Cup appearances for New South Wales in 1982 and 1984 and won that title in 1984.

In a composite New South Wales selection four with Jordi Martin, Graeme Jones and Graham Edmunds, Battersby won the 1981 Australian national coxed four title. He contested the men's coxless pair and the men's coxed pair at the 1982 Australian Rowing Championships. With Steve Evans, Craig Muller and Rick Goodrich, in an all-Mosman crew Battersby won the Australian national coxed four title in 1984. That crew was coached by Rusty Robertson.

== International representative rowing ==
Battersby was first selected to Australian representation in 1981 in a coxed four who raced at the 1981 World Rowing Championships in Munich to a sixth placing. In 1983 Battersby secured the five seat of the Australian eight selected within a limited squad sent to the 1983 World Rowing Championships in Duisburg Germany. The eight performed well in lead up regattas at Vichy, Ratzeburg and Nottingham. In the final at the World Championships the Australian crew drew a bad lane and lost the benefit of the tail breeze however they raced a strong second 1000m and finished in third place for a bronze medal.

The Australian eight selected for the 1984 Los Angeles Olympics was built around the national champion Mosman Rowing Club coxed four and included Evans, Muller and Battersby. Battersby was selected in the six seat. The Australian eight finished third in the final winning bronze behind Canada and the USA.

== Personal ==
Battersby is married to Justine Carroll an Australian champion lightweight rower also from the Mosman Rowing Club who won silver in the Australian women's lightweight four at the 1988 World Rowing Championships in Milan.
