= Craig Muller =

Australian rower

Personal information
- Full name: Craig Muller
- Born: 7 June 1961 (age 65)

Sport
- Club: Mosman Rowing Club
Medal record
Men's rowing
Representing Australia
Olympic Games
Bronze medal – third place	1984 Los Angeles	Eight

Craig Muller (born 7 June 1961) is an Australian former representative rower. He is a five time national champion and Olympic bronze medallist.

== Club and state rowing ==
Muller's senior rowing was with the Mosman Rowing Club in Sydney. He was later made a life member of Mosman an also of Lismore Rowing Club.

He first made state selection in the 1983 New South Wales senior men's eight contesting the King's Cup at the Interstate Regatta within the Australian Rowing Championships. He made every New South Wales King's Cup crew from 1983 to 1987 and rowed to Australian championship victory in that boat of 1984.

In Mosman Rowing Club colours Muller competed for national titles in small sweep-oared boats at every Australian Rowing Championships from 1983 to 1987. With Steve Evans, Jim Battersby and Rick Goodrich, in an all-Mosman crew Muller won the Australian national coxed four title in 1984. In a composite Mosman/Drummoyne/Sydney crew Muller again won the national coxed four title of 1985. Both crews were coached by Rusty Robertson.

In 1986 Muller won the coxless pair national title racing with Steve Evans in Mosman colours and then in 1987 in an Australian selection crew coached by Reinhold Batschi he won the coxless four championship title.

== International representative rowing ==
The Australian eight selected for the 1984 Los Angeles Olympics was built around the national champion Mosman Rowing Club coxed four of Muller, Jim Battersby, and Steve Evans. Muller was selected in the bow seat. The Australian eight finished third in the final with a time of 5:43.40 winning bronze behind Canada and the USA.

== Coaching career ==
Following competitive retirement Muller coached at the Adelaide Rowing Club, Mosman Rowing Club and the ACT Academy of Sport where he was manager of the rowing program. He has coached at s school level at (Loreto Normanhurst and the Scots College). In 2022 he was the rowing co-ordinator at Radford College, Adelaide. For the 2023 season he rook a role as Rowing Caretaker and Boatshed Manager at St Joseph's College, Hunters Hill.
