= Mosman Rowing Club =

Australian rowing club

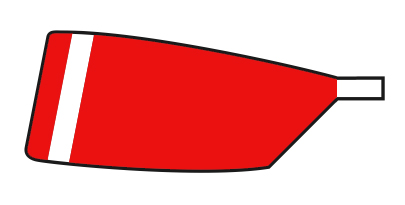
- Location: The Spit, Sydney
- Coordinates: 33°48′50″S 151°14′35″E
- Home water: Middle Harbour, Sydney
- Founded: 1911
- Affiliations: NSW Rowing Association
- Website: mosmanrowing.com

Mosman Rowing Club is an all-level competitive and recreational rowing club on the North Shore of Sydney. Since 2007 the club's facilities have been wholly located at The Spit in Sydney's Middle Harbour, the northern arm of Port Jackson.

== Mercantile club history ==
Mosman's red and white hooped racing colours date back to 1873 when the Mercantile Rowing Club was founded on the west side of Sydney's Circular Quay at Dawes Point. A meeting of warehousemen and merchants' clerks had decided to form a second club the second in the colony (after Sydney Rowing Club). Henry Woolnough was the club's first chairman, he had earlier been a committee member at Sydney. Mercantile's first patron was the Governor of the New South Wales, Sir Hercules Robinson. Mercantile enjoyed a strong patronage but began to struggle in the 1890s and sustained losses when it opened an unsuccessful branch shed at Parramatta.

== Mosman club history ==
In 1911 due to poor water conditions in the busy port and the expiration of a lease, a decision was made to relocate the original boatshed and all rowing equipment to Mosman Bay on the northern side of the harbour and to re-establish the club as the "Mosman Rowing Club". The Dawes Point boatshed was purchased from the disbanded Mercantile club and rebuilt at Mosman in time for new club's official opening on 1 April 1911.

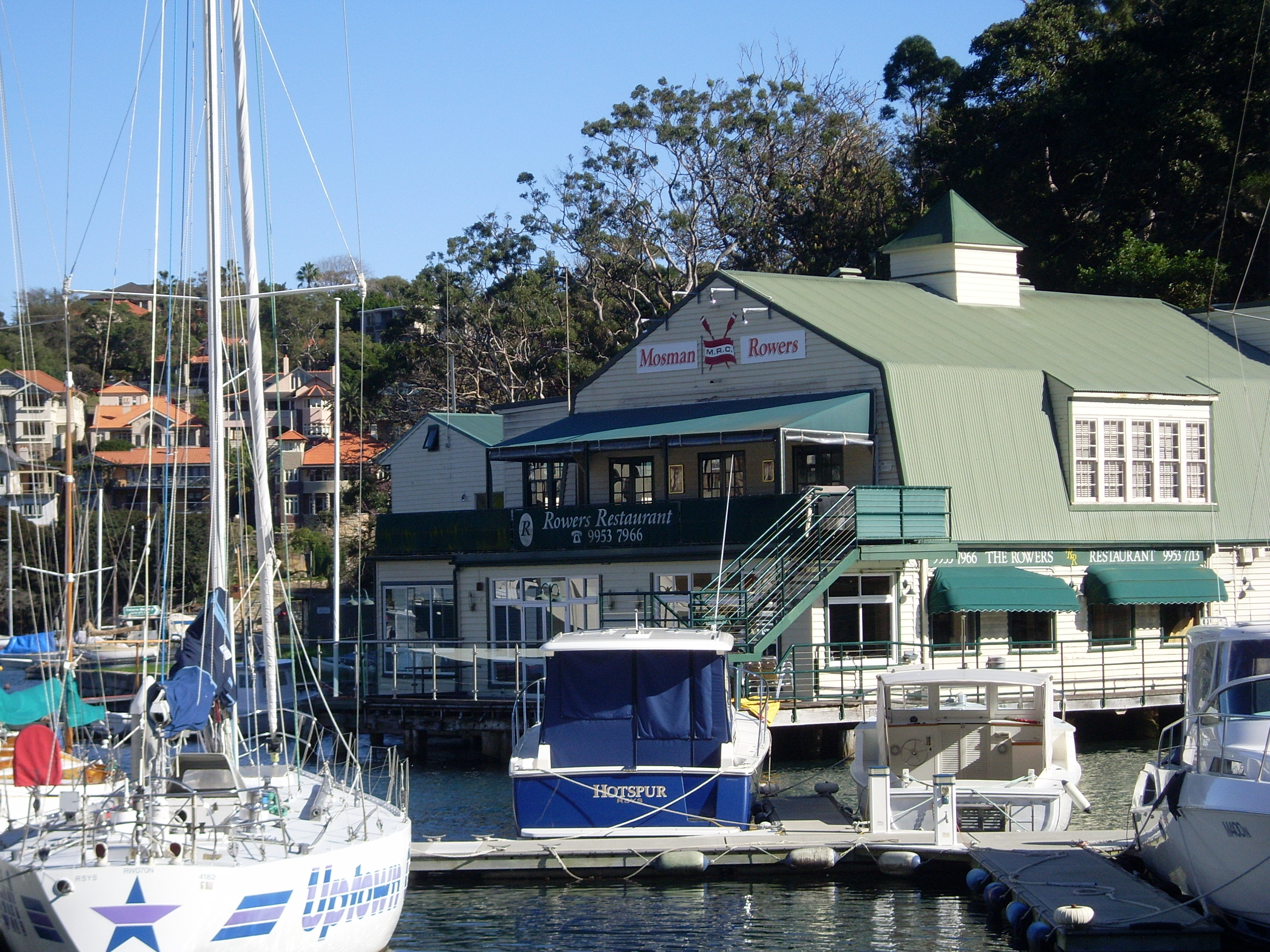
The social clubhouse at Mosman Bay was closed in 2007

The club operated from this building until 1933 when a new clubhouse was built on the same site. Boating and ferry traffic made this location less than ideal and from the 1950s senior training was done from Pearl Bay at The Spit near Mosman. A boatshed facility was built there in 1967 at the cost of $74,000. The Club's rowing facilities were progressively re-housed to Pearl Bay with the Mosman Bay site being transformed to a licensed social club. That site was closed in 2007 and major upgrading and a complete relocation to Pearl Bay had occurred by 2010.

From 1956 the club owned bushland property at Killarney Heights on the foreshore of Middle Harbour with water access looking across to Castlecove. The site was used as a club recreation and rowing camp facility but was never able to be developed and fully utilised. In 2005 the club sold the land for $1.5M but retained a 150-year lease on a building on the property. In June 2012 the club also sold its lease on the building and severed its connection with the Killarney Point site.

== Competition history ==
In 1930 the Mosman VIII was chosen in toto as the state representative eight for New South Wales in the Kings Cup at the Australian Rowing Championships. The crew won the King's Cup. The Mosman club's win that year of the Sydney premiership pennant marked the ninth successive year the club had won the pennant and eclipsed the Sydney Rowing Club's 1880 to 1888 record for the longest successive run.

== Current facilities ==
The MRC, based at Pearl Bay, Mosman is the main rowing centre for some 450 rowers, including elite, seniors, juniors, masters, recreational and school rowers. The shed houses over 100 rowing boats.

The MRC is self-funded by memberships, lease arrangements to schools and private members' ongoing fundraising activities. A number of Sydney's private girl's schools have a leasing and coaching arrangement with the club.

== Members ==
MRC has had representatives in World Rowing Championships and Olympic Games rowing squads over its history. From the Rome 1960 until London 2012 the Mosman club had at least one representative in every Australian Olympic rowing squad excepting Moscow 1980 and Barcelona 1992.

Notable club members include:

- Boxer Snowy Baker who joined the Mercantile club in 1905.

Olympic representative members include:

- Ted Bromley competed at London 1948 in the coxless pair, won four consecutive Kings Cups for NSW and represented at the 1938 British Empire Games
- Peter Raper & Maurie Grace who competed at Melbourne 1956 in the coxless pair.
- Graeme (Mick) Allan and John Hudson were finalists in the Coxed IV at Rome 1960.
- Bob Shirlaw and Roger Ninham competed at Tokyo 1964 in the coxless pair while Gary Herford stroked the 4+. Shirlaw was an Olympic silver medallist in the men's VIII in Mexico City 1968.
- Malcolm Shaw was in the men's VIIIs at Munich 1972 and at Montreal 1976.
- John Clark was in the Australian VIII which competed at Munich 1972.
- Gary Uebergang was in the Australian VIII which competed at Montreal 1976.
- Steve Evans, Jim Battersby and Craig Muller won the bronze medal in the Australian VIII at Los Angeles 1984. Evans also stroked the VIII at Seoul 1988.
- David Weightman silver medallist in the coxless pair at Atlanta 1996.
- Three time Olympian Peter Hardcastle who competed at Sydney 2000, Athens 2004 and Beijing 2008.
- Dual Olympian Tom Laurich who competed at Athens 2004 and Beijing 2008.
- Amy Clay who competed in the women's quad scull at Beijing 2008 and London 2012.
- Daniel Noonan who competed in the quad scull at Beijing 2008 and London 2012.
- Genevieve Horton in the women's double scull at Rio 2016
- Rowena Meredith in the women's quad scull at Tokyo 2021.

World Champions include:

- Steve Evans and Dale Caterson stroke and cox of the championship men's eight of Nottingham 1986.
- Virginia Lee lightweight W4- world champion at Montreal 1992.
