= J. Michael Evans =

Canadian rower and business executive (born 1957)

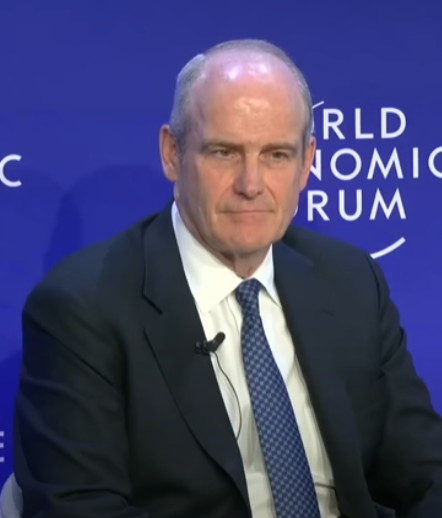
- Speaking at the 2022 World Economic Forum

Personal information
- Born: John Michael Evans; August 16, 1957 (age 69) Toronto, Ontario, Canada
- Education: Princeton University; University College, Oxford
- Occupation: Technology executive
Medal record
Men's rowing
Representing Canada
Olympic Games
Gold medal – first place	1984 Los Angeles	Eight

John Michael Evans (born August 16, 1957) is a Canadian technology executive and the President of Alibaba Group. He previously spent 20 years working for U.S. investment bank Goldman Sachs and is a former Olympic rower.

== Early life, family and education ==
Evans was born to Dr. John Robert Evans and his wife Jean on August 16, 1957. Besides his twin brother Mark, he has four other siblings: Derek, Gillian (Gill), Timothy (Tim), and Willa.

He attended Upper Canada College in Toronto and received his bachelor's degree from Princeton University. He later studied at University College, Oxford where he stroked the Oxford boat in the Oxford-Cambridge Boat Race. Alongside his twin brother Mark, Evans went on to join the Canadian Olympic team, where he won a gold medal in rowing at the 1984 Summer Games in Los Angeles.

== Career ==
In 2015, Evans was appointed President of Alibaba Group, where he leads Alibaba Group’s international growth strategy outside of China and reports to CEO Daniel Zhang. Evans has served on the board of Alibaba Group since its September 2014 IPO, and has known Alibaba Group founder Jack Ma since 1999 when Ma first approached Goldman Sachs regarding an early investment in the company. Evans was named as one of the National Retail Federation’s Power Players in 2019 for his work at Alibaba Group.

In addition, Evans is currently a member of the Board of Directors of Barrick Gold Corporation and several not-for-profit organizations.

He is also a trustee of the Asia Society and a member of the Advisory Council for the Bendheim Center for Finance at Princeton University.

Before Alibaba Group, Evans was vice chairman of Goldman Sachs, chairman of Goldman Sachs Asia and spent 19 years as a Partner after joining the firm in 1993.

In the high-profile IPO, Goldman was one of six lead underwriters with Mark Schwartz, chairman of Goldman Asia Pacific, named as lead banker for Goldman in a lead-up New York Times report.

In 2019 Evans was charged for his involvement in the 1MDB scandal, which took place during his time at Goldman Sachs, which was settled. In 2019, Malaysia charged 17 former and current Goldman Sachs bankers with corruption at its state fund 1MDB, including Michael Evans a former partner who is currently president of the Chinese e-commerce company Alibaba. The severity of the charges were because of the scheme to defraud and fraudulent misappropriation of billions in bond proceeds, the lengthy period over which the offences were planned and executed, the number of Goldman Sachs subsidiaries, officers, and employees involved and the relative value of the fees and commissions paid to Goldman Sachs for arranging structuring, underwriting and selling the bonds. In addition to Evans, Michael Sherwood a former co-head of Goldman's European operations was charged.

== Philanthropy ==
During the COVID-19 pandemic, Evans was personally involved in several philanthropic efforts to donate personal protective equipment (PPE) for healthcare workers in New York. New York Governor Andrew Cuomo acknowledged in a press briefing that Alibaba Group’s and Evans’ assistance had been “very helpful to us.” Alibaba Group provided three million face masks, 2,000 medical ventilators, 170,000 pieces of protective gear to New York in March 2020 through the philanthropic arm of the company, the Alibaba Foundation and the Jack Ma Foundation. New York's Governor Andrew Cuomo held a public thanking ceremony expressing their gratitude to Alibaba Foundation for their support. John Tsai, one of Alibaba's co-founders, donated 2.6 million surgical masks, 170,000 goggles and 2,000 ventilators to New York city hospitals. Michael Evans who was President of Alibaba Group at the time was personally involved in donating PPE for healthcare workers in New York and Gov. Andrew Cuomo acknowledged Alibaba's and Evans' assistance.

== See also ==
- List of Princeton University Olympians
- Mark Evans
