= Romania at the 1988 Summer Olympics =

- IOC code: ROU (ROM used at these Games)
- NOC: Romanian Olympic Committee

in Seoul
- Competitors: 68 (32 men, 36 women) in 10 sports
- Flag bearer: Vasile Andrei
- Medals Ranked 8th: Gold 7 Silver 11 Bronze 6 Total 24

Summer Olympics appearances (overview)
- 1900; 1904–1920; 1924; 1928; 1932; 1936; 1948; 1952; 1956; 1960; 1964; 1968; 1972; 1976; 1980; 1984; 1988; 1992; 1996; 2000; 2004; 2008; 2012; 2016; 2020; 2024

Romania competed at the 1988 Summer Olympics in Seoul, South Korea. 68 competitors, 32 men and 36 women, took part in 59 events in 10 sports.

== Medalists ==
Medal	Name	Sport	Event	Date
Gold	Sorin Babii	Shooting	Men's 50 metre pistol	18 September
Gold	Rodica Arba; Olga Homeghi-Bularda	Rowing	Women's coxless pair	24 September
Gold	Daniela Silivaș	Gymnastics	Women's uneven bars	25 September
Gold	Daniela Silivaș	Gymnastics	Women's balance beam	25 September
Gold	Daniela Silivaș	Gymnastics	Women's floor	25 September
Gold	Vasile Pușcașu	Wrestling	Men's freestyle 100 kg	30 September
Gold	Paula Ivan	Athletics	Women's 1500 metres	1 October
Silver	Noëmi Lung	Swimming	Women's 400 metre individual medley	19 September
Silver	Aurelia Dobre; Eugenia Golea; Celestina Popa; Gabriela Potorac; Daniela Silivaș; Camelia Voinea	Gymnastics	Women's artistic team all-around	21 September
Silver	Daniela Silivaș	Gymnastics	Women's artistic individual all-around	23 September
Silver	Veronica Cogeanu; Liliana Geneș; Elisabeta Lipă	Rowing	Women's double sculls	24 September
Silver	Marin Gheorghe; Ladislau Lovrenschi; Dimitrie Popescu; Valentin Robu; Ioan Snep; Vasile Tomoiagă	Rowing	Men's coxed four	24 September
Silver	Dănuț Dobre; Dragoș Neagu	Rowing	Men's coxless pair	24 September
Silver	Herta Anitaș; Rodica Arba; Mihaela Armășescu; Doina Liliana Bălan; Adriana Bazon; Olga Homeghi-Bularda; Viorica Ilica; Veronica Necula; Ecaterina Oancia; Livia Țicanu; Marioara Trașcă	Rowing	Women's eight	25 September
Silver	Gabriela Potorac	Gymnastics	Women's vault	25 September
Silver	Paula Ivan	Athletics	Women's 3000 metres	25 September
Silver	Nicu Vlad	Weightlifting	Men's 100 kg	26 September
Silver	Daniel Dumitrescu	Boxing	Featherweight	2 October
Bronze	Herta Anitaș; Mihaela Armășescu; Doina Liliana Bălan; Adriana Bazon; Veronica Necula; Ecaterina Oancia; Marioara Trașcă	Rowing	Women's coxed four	24 September
Bronze	Marius Gherman	Gymnastics	Men's horizontal bar	24 September
Bronze	Noëmi Lung	Swimming	Women's 200 metre individual medley	24 September
Bronze	Anișoara Bălan; Doina Ciucanu; Veronica Cogeanu; Elisabeta Lipă; Anișoara Minea	Rowing	Women's quadruple sculls	25 September
Bronze	Daniela Silivaș	Gymnastics	Women's vault	25 September
Bronze	Gabriela Potorac	Gymnastics	Women's balance beam	25 September

== Competitors ==
The following is the list of number of competitors in the Games.

Sport	Men	Women	Total
Athletics	1	4	5
Boxing	2	–	2
Canoeing	5	0	5
Fencing	0	2	2
Gymnastics	6	6	12
Rowing	8	18	26
Shooting	2	1	3
Swimming	0	5	5
Weightlifting	4	–	4
Wrestling	4	–	4
Total	32	36	68

== Athletics ==
Men's High Jump

- Sorin Matei

Women's 1,500 metres

- Paula Ivan
- Doina Melinte

Women's 3,000 metres

- Paula Ivan
- Maricica Puică

Women's High Jump

- Galina Astafei

== Fencing ==
Two female fencers represented Romania in 1988.

Women's foil

- Elisabeta Guzganu-Tufan
- Reka Zsofia Lazăr-Szabo

== Swimming ==
Women's 50m Freestyle

- Tamara Costache

- Heat – 26.06
- Final – 25.80 (→ 6th place)

- Liliana Dobrescu

- Heat – 26.56 (→ did not advance, 17th place)

Women's 100m Freestyle

- Liliana Dobrescu

- Heat – 56.67
- B-Final – 56.79 (→ 11th place)

- Tamara Costache

- Heat – 56.79
- B-Final – 57.11 (→ 16th place)

Women's 200m Freestyle

- Liliana Dobrescu

- Heat – 2:01.93
- B-Final – 2:01.98 (→ 12th place)

- Stela Marian Pura

- Heat – 2:02.26
- B-Final – 2:02.30 (→ 13th place)

Women's 400m Freestyle

- Noemi Lung

- Heat – 4:12.42
- B-Final – 4:11.68 (→ 10th place)

- Stela Marian Pura

- Heat – 4:15.78
- B-Final – 4:12.14 (→ 11th place)

Women's 100m Backstroke

- Aneta Patrscoiu

- Heat – 1:03.29
- B-Final – 1:03.33 (→ 9th place)

Women's 200m Backstroke

- Aneta Patrscoiu

- Heat – 2:17.25
- B-Final – 2:15.75 (→ 9th place)

Women's 100m Butterfly

- Stela Marian Pura

- Heat – 1:03.91 (→ did not advance, 24th place)

Women's 200m Butterfly

- Stela Marian Pura

- Heat – 2:12.53
- Final – 2:11.28 (→ 4th place)

Women's 200m Individual Medley

- Noemi Lung

- Heat – 2:15.55
- Final – 2:14.85 (→ Bronze Medal)

- Aneta Patrascoiu

- Heat – 2:17.39
- Final – 2:16.70 (→ 6th place)

Women's 400m Individual Medley

- Noemi Lung

- Heat – 4:41.96
- Final – 4:39.46 (→ Silver Medal)
