= 1987 World Rowing Championships =

International rowing event

- Location: Copenhagen, Denmark
- Dates: 29 to 30 August

The 1987 World Rowing Championships were World Rowing Championships that were held from 29 to 30 August 1987 in Copenhagen, Denmark while it was "outrageously windy".

== Medal summary ==
Medalists at the 1987 World Rowing Championships were:

=== Men's events ===
Event:	Gold:	Time	Silver:	Time	Bronze:	Time
M1x	East Germany; Thomas Lange	7:37.48	West Germany; Peter-Michael Kolbe	7:40.76	Finland; Pertti Karppinen	7:40.90
M2-	Great Britain; Andy Holmes; Steve Redgrave	7:11.20	Romania; Dragoș Neagu; Dănuț Dobre	7:12.60	Soviet Union; Yuriy Pimenov; Nikolay Pimenov	7:15.98
M2+	Italy; Carmine Abbagnale; Giuseppe Abbagnale; Giuseppe Di Capua (cox)	7:40.81	Great Britain; Andy Holmes; Steve Redgrave; Patrick Sweeney (cox)	7:42.88	Romania; Dimitrie Popescu; Vasile Tomoiagă; Marin Gheorghe (cox)	7:44.96
M2x	Bulgaria; Daniel Yordanov; Vasil Radev	7:03.33	West Germany; Andreas Schmelz; Ralf Thienel	7:06.33	East Germany; Uwe Sägling; Uwe Heppner	7:06.83
M4-	East Germany; Jens Luedecke; Thomas Greiner; Ralf Brudel; Olaf Förster	6:39.70	Soviet Union; Veniamin But; Sigitas Kučinskas; Jonas Narmontas; Andrey Vasilyev	6:41.30	United States; Ted Swinford; Daniel Lyons; John Riley; Robert Espeseth	6:42.46
M4+	East Germany; Frank Klawonn; Bernd Eichwurzel; Bernd Niesecke; Karsten Schmeling; Hendrik Reiher (cox)	6:41.74	Soviet Union; Viktor Omelyanovich; Mykola Komarov; Vladimir Romanishin; Valentin Gerasimenko; Hryhoriy Dmytrenko (cox)	6:45.17	Italy; Antonio Maurogiovanni; Giovanni Suarez; Renato Gaeta; Giuseppe Carando; Dino Lucchetta (cox)	6:47.30
M4x	Soviet Union; Valeriy Dosenko; Sergey Kinyakin; Mikhail Ivanov; Igor Kotko	6:11.25	Norway; Vetle Vinje; Lars Bjønness; Rolf Thorsen; Alf Hansen	6:13.02	Canada; Doug Hamilton; Robert Mills; Paul Douma; Mel LaForme	6:14.40
M8+	United States; Mike Teti; Jonathan Smith; Ted Patton; Michael Still; Peter Nordell; Jeffrey McLaughlin; Doug Burden; John Pescatore; Seth Bauer (cox)	5:58.83	East Germany; Mario Kliesch; Dirk Rendant; Thomas Bänsch; Holger Rose; Andreas Costrau; Hans Sennewald; Karsten Timm; Karsten Schmeling; Peter Thiede (cox)	6:01.94	Italy; Ettore Bulgarelli; Giuseppe Di Palo; Antonio Baldacci; Piero Carletto; Giovanni Miccoli; Alfredo Bollati; Annibale Venier; Franco Zucchi; Paolo Trisciani (cox)	6:03.61
Men's lightweight events
LM1x	Belgium; Wim Van Belleghem	8:06.10	Canada; David Wright	8:11.43	Italy; Ruggero Verroca	8:13.80
LM2x	Italy; Enrico Gandola; Giovanni Calabrese	7:40.38	France; Luc Crispon; Thierry Renault	7:40.68	Great Britain; Carl Smith; Allan Whitwell	7:52.58
LM4-	West Germany; Thomas Palm; Erik Ring; Gerd Meyer; Sebastian Franke	6:42.14	Great Britain; Christopher Bates; Peter Haining; Neil Staite; Stuart Forbes	6:44.05	Italy; Franco Pantano; Dario Longhin; Nerio Gainotti; Mauro Torta	6:46.10
LM8+	Italy; Maurizio Losi; Alfredo Striani; Vittorio Torcellan; Massimo Lana; Stefano Spremberg; Carlo Gaddi; Andrea Re; Fabrizio Ravasi; Sebastiano Zanetti (cox)	6:30.04	West Germany; Bernhard Stomporowski; Björn Gehlsen; Alwin Otten; Harald Galster; Detlef Glitsch; Udo Hennig; Andreas Hobler; Wolfgang Birkner; Torsten Kreis (cox)	6:36.59	United States; Scott Petry; Seymour Danberg; Chris Berl; Samuel Shuffler; Michael Morrison; John Irvine; Kevin Clair; Edward Hewitt; Michael O'Gorman (cox)	6:45.48

=== Women's events ===
Event:	Gold:	Time	Silver:	Time	Bronze:	Time
W1x	Bulgaria; Magdalena Georgieva	8:59.26	East Germany; Martina Schröter	9:14.26	Romania; Marioara Popescu	9:20.29
W2-	Romania; Rodica Arba; Olga Homeghi	8:00.73	East Germany; Kathrin Haacker; Ute Wild	8:06.54	Soviet Union; Marina Pegova; Nadezhda Sugako	8:08.78
W2x	Bulgaria; Stefka Madina; Violeta Ninova	7:47.89	Romania; Elisabeta Lipă; Liliana Genes	7:47.99	United States; Anne Marden; Barbara Kirch	7:51.42
W4+	Romania; Valentina Virlan; Marioara Trașcă; Adriana Chelariu; Veronica Necula; Ecaterina Oancia (cox)	7:30.12	East Germany; Birte Siech; Gerlinde Doberschütz; Carola Hornig; Martina Walther; Sylvia Müller (cox)	7:34.09	Bulgaria; Manuela Lashilina; Olya Stoichkova; Mariana Stoyanova; Daniela Oronova; Sofiya Tzvetkova (cox)	7:40.73
W4x	East Germany; Kerstin Pieloth; Birgit Peter; Jutta Hampe; Jana Sorgers	6:58.42	Bulgaria; Pavlina Alexandrova; Krasimira Tocheva; Galina Yahorova; Mariana Yankulova	7:00.90	Soviet Union; Svitlana Maziy; Marina Zhukova; Irina Kalimbet; Antonina Zelikovich	7:02.87
W8+	Romania; Valentina Virlan; Marioara Trașcă; Livia Țicanu; Rodica Arba; Adriana Chelariu; Veronica Necula; Olga Homeghi; Lucia Toader; Ecaterina Oancia (cox)	6:55.61	United States; Anna Seaton; Kristen Thorsness; Christine Campbell; Sarah Gengler; Stephanie Maxwell-Pierson; Susan Broome; Abigail Peck; Harriet Metcalf; Betsy Beard (cox)	6:57.27	Soviet Union; Sarmīte Stone; Lidiya Averyanova; Irina Teterina; Elena Makushkina; Olena Pukhaieva; Sariya Zakyrova; Marina Suprun; Elena Tereshina; Valentina Khokhlova (cox)	7:03.25
Women's lightweight events
LW1x	Romania; Maria Sava	8:57.69	Belgium; Rita Defauw	8:57.89	Italy; Francesca Bentivoglio	9:05.58
LW2x	Canada; Janice Mason; Heather Hattin	8:36.60	Belgium; Lucia Focque; Marie-Anne van der Moere	8:41.35	United States; Carey Sands-Marden; Christine Ernst	8:51.02
LW4-	United States; Sandy Kendall; Lindsay Burns; Angela Herron; Mandi Kowal	8:08.32	West Germany; Christiane Zimmer; Sonja Petri; Monika Wolf; Evelyn Herwegh	8:08.66	China; Yan Dongling; Long Jun; Luo Hantao; Zhang Xiange	8:13.81
