= Gruppo Sportivo della Marina Militare =

- Sport: 9 disciplines
- Jurisdiction: Italy
- Abbreviation: G.S. Marina Militare
- Founded: 1952
- Affiliation: CONI
- Headquarters: Sabaudia

Official website
- www.marina.difesa.it
- (Italy)

Gruppo Sportivo della Marina Militare is the sports group of the Italian Navy.

The group primarily comprises athletes who participate in water sports.

== History ==
The first Olympic gold medal for the Gruppo Sportivo della Marina Militare was won by wrestler Enrico Porro at the 1908 London Games.

== Sports ==
The Gruppo Sportivo della Marina Militare originally included nine disciplines across five competitive sports centres. This number later increased to fifteen disciplines.

When there is ✓ are the seven new disciplines, excluding any that were subsequently removed:

Competitive sports centre for swimming

- Swimming
- Open water swimming ✓
- Lifesaving ✓
- Diving
- Surf lifesaving

Competitive sports centre for whitewater slalom

- Wildwater canoeing
- Canoe freestyle ✓

Competitive sports centre for shooting

- Shooting
- Shotgun ✓
- Archery ✓

Sports yachting centre of Naples

- Sailing (Olympic)
- Sailing Mini 650 ✓
- Offshore sailing ✓

Navy rowing sports centre

- Rowing
- Canoeing (sprint)
- ~~Naval pentathlon~~

== Notable athletes ==
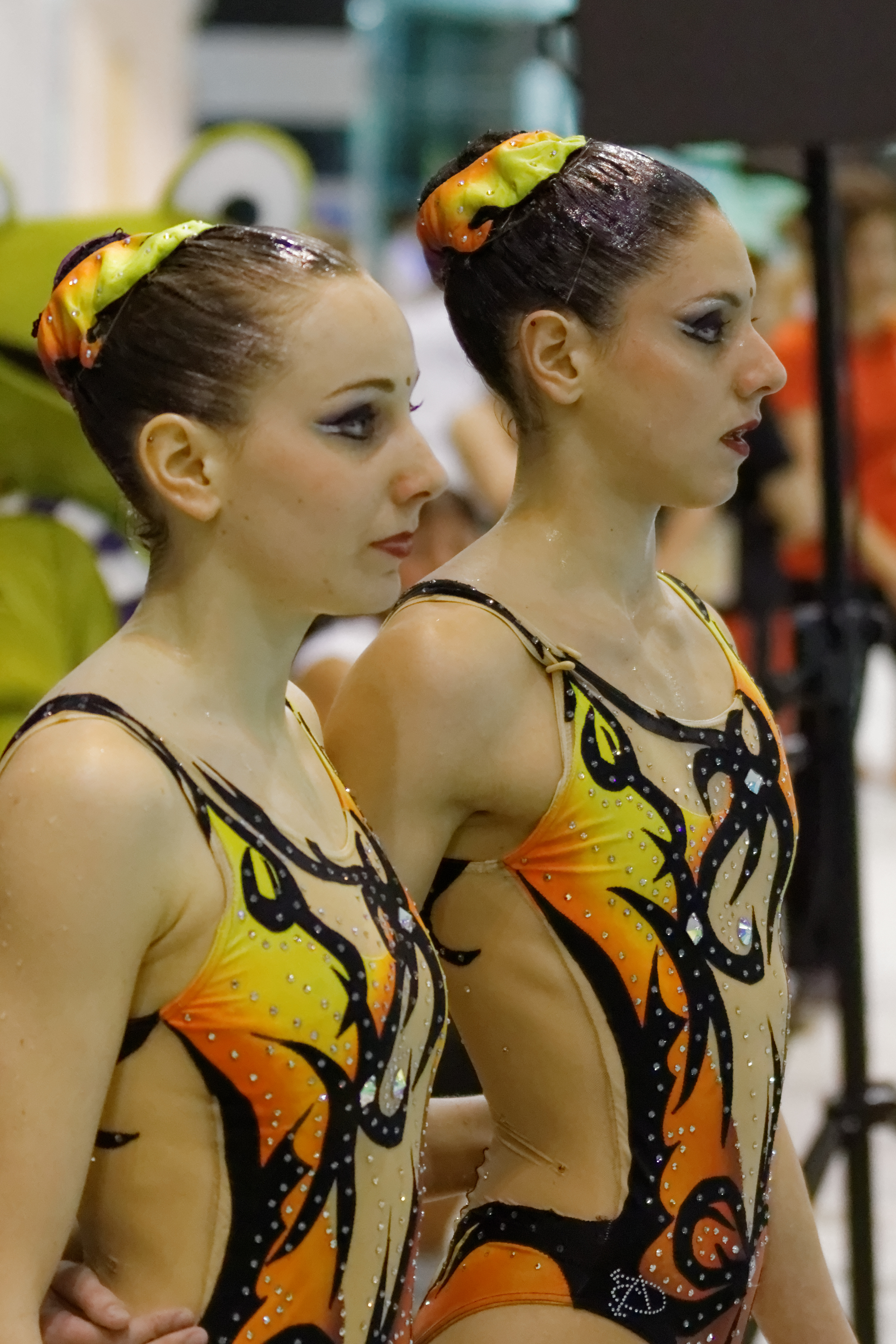
Costanza Ferro and Linda Cerruti in 2013.

=== Past athletes ===
Canoeing

- Aldo Dezi – Olympic silver medallist in 1960; the first Italian to win an Olympic medal in canoeing.
- Oreste Perri – Four-time world champion from 1974 to 1977.

Rowing

- Giliante D'Este – Olympic champion in 1928; also won a bronze medal for the Marina Militare in 1932.
- Daniele Boschin – World champion (1982)
- Renzo Borsini – World champion (1982)
- Alfredo Striani – World champion (1988)
- Enrico Barbaranelli – World champion (1988)
- Franco Falossi – World champion (1990)
- Roberto Romanini – World champion (1990)
- Michelangelo Crispi – World champion (1992)
- Franco Sancassani – Nine-time world champion between 1996 and 2011.

Sailing

- Luigi De Manincor – Olympic champion in 1936.
- Agostino Straulino – Olympic champion in 1952.
- Nicolò Rode – Olympic champion in 1952.
- Gabrio Zandonà – World champion in 2003.

=== Athletes qualified for London 2012 ===
Five athletes of Marina Militare qualified for the 2012 Summer Olympics.

1. Gabrio Zandonà (Sailing)
2. Pietro Ruta (Rowing)
3. Michele Benedetti (Diving)
4. Tommaso Rinaldi (Diving)
5. Elania Nardelli (Shooting)
6. Stefano Cipressi (Canoe slalom)

=== Athletes qualified for Rio 2016 ===
Nine athletes of Marina Militare qualified for the 2016 Summer Olympics.

1. Giovanni Abagnale (Rowing), won Bronze
2. Luca Parlato (Rowing)
3. Antonio Barillà (Shooting)
4. Michele Benedetti (Diving)
5. Elisa Bozzo (Synchronised swimming)
6. Linda Cerruti (Synchronised swimming)
7. Beatrice Callegari (Synchronised swimming)
8. Costanza Ferro (Synchronised swimming)
9. Stefanie Horn (Canoe slalom)

== Olympics gold medals ==
Athletes from the Gruppo Sportivo della Marina Militare have won a total of six gold medals at the Olympic Games.

Competition	Athlete	Event	Medal
Olympic Games
London 1908	Enrico Porro	Wrestling - Greco-Roman lightweight	Gold
Paris 1924	Francesco Martino	Gymnastics - Rings	Gold
Paris 1924	Francesco Martino	Gymnastics - Team all araund	Gold
Amsterdam 1928	Giliante D'Este	Rowing - Coxed four	Gold
Berlin 1936	Luigi De Manincor	Sailing - 8 metre	Gold
London 1948	Geminio Ognio	Water polo	Gold
Helsinki 1952	Agostino Straulino, Nicolò Rode	Sailing - Star	Gold

== See also ==
- Italian Navy
- Italian military sports bodies
