= Andrea Re =

Italian rower (born 1963)

Personal information
- Born: 15 November 1963 (age 62) Pavia, Italy
- Years active: until 1998
- Height: 185 cm (6 ft 1 in)
- Weight: 72 kg (159 lb)

Sport
- Sport: Rowing
- Club: Gruppo Sportivo Fiamme Oro; CUS Pavia
Medal record
Men's rowing
Representing Italy
World Championships
| Gold medal – first place | 1995 Tampere | LM4- |
| Bronze medal – third place | 1994 Indianapolis | LM8+ |
| Bronze medal – third place | 1993 Račice | LM8+ |
| Gold medal – first place | 1991 Vienna | LM8+ |
| Gold medal – first place | 1990 Tasmania | LM8+ |
| Gold medal – first place | 1989 Bled | LM8+ |
| Gold medal – first place | 1988 Milan | LM8+ |
| Gold medal – first place | 1987 Copenhagen | LM8+ |
| Gold medal – first place | 1986 Nottingham | LM8+ |
| Gold medal – first place | 1985 Hazewinkel | LM8+ |
| Silver medal – second place | 1984 Montreal | LM8+ |

Andrea Re (born 15 November 1963) is an Italian lightweight rower. With eight gold medals at World Rowing Championships, he is one of the most successful rowers ever. He represented Italy at the 1996 Summer Olympics in Atlanta, USA.

== Biography ==
Re was born in 1963 in Pavia, Italy. He first competed at World Rowing Championships in 1983 when he came sixth as part of a lightweight men's four, partnered with Daniele Boschin, Paolo Marostica, and Vittorio Torcellan. He won his first medal—silver—at the 1984 World Rowing Championships in Montreal, Canada, with the lightweight men's eight. At the 1985 World Rowing Championships in Hazewinkel, Belgium, he won gold with the lightweight men's eight. He continued to win gold with the lightweight men's eight in 1986 in Nottingham, in 1987 in Copenhagen, in 1988 in Milan, in 1989 in Bled, in 1990 in Tasmania, and in 1991 in Vienna.

1992 was the last time that lightweight boat classes were not included at the Summer Olympics, hence the lightweight men's eight competed at the 1992 World Rowing Championships in Montreal, Canada, where Re and his team came fifth. At the 1993 World Rowing Championships in Račice, Czech Republic, the lightweight men's eight won a bronze medal. At the 1994 World Rowing Championships in Indianapolis, USA, the Italian lightweight men's eight again won bronze. After it was announced that men's lightweight double sculls and men's lightweight coxless four would be Olympic boat classes at the 1996 Summer Olympics, many nations put their best sweep-oar rowers in their lightweight men's four for the 1995 World Rowing Championships in Tampere, Finland. Accordingly, Re changed to the lightweight men's four and his team won gold. As the reigning world champions, the Italian lightweight four disappointed at the 1996 Summer Olympics in Atlanta, USA, and the team missed the A-final for an eventual eighth place.

At the 1997 World Rowing Championships in Aiguebelette, France, the lightweight men's four came fourth. Re competed at two of the World Rowing Cups in 1998 before he retired. During his career, Re had competed for the Gruppo Sportivo Fiamme Oro and for CUS Pavia.
