= 1985 World Rowing Championships =

International rowing event

- Venue: Hazewinkel
- Location: Heindonk, Willebroek, Belgium
- Dates: 26 August to 1 September

The 1985 World Rowing Championships refer to the World Rowing Championships held from 26 August to 1 September 1985 at Hazewinkel in Heindonk, Belgium.

== Medal summary ==
Medalists at the 1985 World Rowing Championships were:

=== Men's events ===
Event	Gold		Silver		Bronze	
M1x	Finland; Pertti Karppinen	6:48.08	United States; Andrew Sudduth	6:50.96	West Germany; Peter-Michael Kolbe	6:59.75
M2x	East Germany; Thomas Lange; Uwe Heppner	6:15.49	Soviet Union; Mykola Chupryna; Yuriy Zelikovich	6:19.48	Switzerland; Jürg Weitnauer; Urs Steinemann	6:22.27
M4x	Canada; Doug Hamilton; Robert Mills; Paul Douma; Mel LaForme	5:44.57	East Germany; Jens Köppen; Rüdiger Reiche; Uwe Sägling; Karl-Heinz Bußert	5:44.85	Czechoslovakia; Jan Vochoska; Zdeněk Bureš; Miloš Zářecký; Jaroslav Švrček	5:47.42
M2-	Soviet Union; Nikolay Pimenov; Yuriy Pimenov	6:38.39	Great Britain; Adam Clift; Martin Cross	6:38.47	Spain; Fernando Climent; Luis María Lasúrtegui	6:40.23
M2+	Italy; Carmine Abbagnale; Giuseppe Abbagnale; Giuseppe Di Capua (c)	6:53.40	Romania; Dimitrie Popescu; Vasile Tomoiagă; Dumitru Răducanu (c)	6:56.04	East Germany; Thomas Kessler; Uwe Gasch; Olaf Gerschau (c)	6:57.80
M4-	West Germany; Norbert Keßlau; Volker Grabow; Jörg Puttlitz; Guido Grabow	6:00.19	Soviet Union; Jonas Narmontas; Sergey Smirnov; Viktor Pereverzev; Gennadi Kryuçkin	6:01.25	East Germany; Hans Sennewald; Thomas Greiner; Thomas Bänsch; Olaf Förster	6:03.87
M4+	Soviet Union; Sigitas Kučinskas; Ivan Visotchkin; Vladimir Romanishin; Igor Zotov; Mikhail Sassov (c)	6:07.23	Italy; Mario Lafranconi; Giovanni Suarez; Gino Iseppi; Giuseppe Carando; Siro Meli (c)	6:08.79	East Germany; Dietmar Schiller; Karsten Schmeling; Bernd Niesecke; Bernd Eichwurzel; Hendrik Reiher (c)	6:08.97
M8+	Soviet Union; Mykola Komarov; Viktor Diduk; Jonas Pinskus; Veniamin But; Viktor Omelyanovich; Pavlo Hurkovskiy; Aleksander Voloshin; Andrey Vasilyev; Hryhoriy Dmytrenko (c)	5:33.71	Italy; Agostino Abbagnale; Sergio Caropreso; Antonio Maurogiovanni; Alfredo Bollati; Giovanni Miccoli; Maurizio Donna; Annibale Venier; Pasquale Marigliano; Siro Meli (c)	5:34.58	United States; John Strotbeck; Thomas Kiefer; Jonathan Smith; Kurt Bausback; Chris Penny; Kevin Still; Chris Huntington; Michael Teti; Mark Zembsch (c)	5:34.72
Men's lightweight events
LM1x	Italy; Ruggero Verroca	7:05.80	Austria; Raimund Haberl	7:10.16	United States; Paul Fuchs	7:10.56
LM2x	France; Luc Crispon; Thierry Renault	6:29.44	Italy; Carlo Gaddi; Francesco Esposito	6:30.05	West Germany; Hartmut Schäfer; Roland Ehrenfels	6:32.50
LM4-	West Germany; Alwin Otten; Frank Rogall; Thomas Jaekel; Wolfgang Birkner	6:12.44	Italy; Franco Pantano; Dario Longhin; Nerio Gainotti; Mauro Torta	6:14.97	United States; Edward Gribbin; Charles Cobbs; Michael Morrison; Fred Michini	6:17.18
LM8+	Italy; Maurizio Losi; Michele Savoia; Vittorio Torcellan; Massimo Lana; Stefano Spremberg; Paolo Marostica; Andrea Re; Fabrizio Ravasi; Massimo Di Deco (c)	5:46.66	United States; Mark Hanley; Seymour Danberg; Neil Olesen; Michael Scott; John Younger; Peter Kermond; Charles Butt; Stephen Schmitt; Jonathan Fish (c)	5:48.47	Spain; José Manuel Cañete; José Crespo; Carlos Muniesa; Jacinto Accensi Abella; Víctor Llorente; Fernando Molina Castillo; Eulogio Génova; Benito Elizalde; Ibon Alcorta (c)	5:50.88

=== Women's events ===
Event	Gold		Silver		Bronze	
W1x	East Germany; Cornelia Linse	7:48.37	Romania; Valeria Răcilă	7:45.85	United States; Anne Marden	7:48.43
W2x	East Germany; Sylvia Schwabe; Martina Schröter	6:58.80	Romania; Mărioara Popescu; Elisabeta Lipă	7:05.70	Bulgaria; Magdalena Georgieva; Violeta Ninova	7:06.52
W4x	East Germany; Ramona Balthasar; Birgit Peter; Jutta Hampe; Kristina Mundt	6:22.47	Soviet Union; Antonina Machina; Nataliya Grigoryeva; Yelena Khloptseva; Yelena Matiyevskaya	6:23.99	Romania; Anișoara Bălan; Veronica Cochela; Anișoara Sorohan; Maricica Țăran	6:29.09
W2-	Romania; Rodica Arba; Elena Horvat	7:25.08	United States; Sherri Cassuto; Susan Broome	7:31.96	East Germany; Kerstin Toußaint; Ramona Hein	7:34.44
W4+	East Germany; Kerstin Spittler; Jutta Abromeit; Steffi Götzelt; Carola Lichey; Daniela Neunast (c)	6:50.08	Romania; Florica Lavric; Maria Fricioiu; Chira Apostol; Olga Homeghi; Viorica Ioja (c)	6:53.33	Canada; Lisa Robertson; Barbara Armbrust; Christina Clarke; Tricia Smith; Lesley Thompson (c)	6:55.67
W8+	Soviet Union; Olena Pukhaieva; Sariya Zakyrova; Elena Tereshina; Marina Suprun; Marina Znak; Irina Teterina; Nataliya Yatsenko; Lidiya Averyanova; Valentina Khokhlova (c)	6:14.00	East Germany; Susann Heinicke; Gerlinde Doberschütz-Mey; Beatrix Lehman; Martina Walther; Kathrin Thurm; Ute Stange; Kathrin Dienstbier; Carola Hornig; Sylke Kretzschmar (c)	6:14.89	Romania; Doina Bălan; Marioara Trașcă; Livia Țicanu; Mihaela Armășescu; Adriana Chelariu; Carolina Matei; Camelia Diaconescu; Lucia Sauca; Ecaterina Oancia (c)	6:19.49
Women's lightweight events
LW1x	Australia; Adair Ferguson	7:59.82	Romania; Maria Micșa	8:01.58	United States; Ann Martin	8:02.74
LW2x	Great Britain; Lin Clark; Beryl Crockford	7:30.52	West Germany; Brigitte Helmers; Alrun Urbach	7:33.31	France; Desiree Decriem; Isabelle Lignan	7:38.90
LW4-	West Germany; Monika Wolf; Sonja Petri; Claudia Engels; Evelyn Herwegh	7:05.31	United States; Sandy Kendall; Jennifer Marron; Marise Widmer; Charlotte Hollings	7:10.38	Australia; Denise Rennex; Karin Riedel; Amanda Cross; Gayle Toogood	7:12.84

== Medal table ==
Platz	Land	Gold	Silver	Bronze	Total
1	East Germany	5	2	4	11
2	Soviet Union	4	3		7
3	Italy	3	4		7
4	West Germany	3	1	2	6
5	Romania	1	5	2	8
6	Great Britain	1	1		2
7	Australia	1		1	2
7	Canada	1		1	2
7	France	1		1	2
10	Finland	1			1
11	United States		4	5	9
12	Austria		1		1
13	Spain			2	2
14	Bulgaria			1	1
14	Switzerland			1	1
14	Czechoslovakia			1	1
Summe		21	21	21	63
