= 1986 World Rowing Championships =

International rowing event

- Venue: National Watersports Centre
- Location: Nottingham, United Kingdom
- Dates: 17 to 24 August

The 1986 World Rowing Championships were World Rowing Championships that were held from 17 to 24 August 1986 at Nottingham in the United Kingdom.

== Medal summary ==
Looking at the open weight classes only, East Germany was the most successful nation (4 gold – 2 silver – 5 bronze) followed by the Soviet Union (3–2–2) and Romania (2–2–1).

=== Men's events ===
Event:	Gold:	Time	Silver:	Time	Bronze:	Time
M1x	West Germany; Peter-Michael Kolbe	6:54.90	Finland; Pertti Karppinen	6:58.90	Soviet Union; Vasil Yakusha	7:00.13
M2x	Italy; Alberto Belgeri (b); Igor Pescialli (s)	6:11.33	Bulgaria; Chavdar Radev (b); Dimitar Kamburski (s)	6:32.22	East Germany; Andreas Hajek (b); Uwe Heppner (s)	6:33.64
M4x	Soviet Union; Valeriy Dosenko (b); Sergey Kinyakin (2); Mikhail Ivanov (3); Igor Kotko (s)	5:47.41	Poland; Waldemar Wojda (b); Mirosław Mruk (2); Sławomir Cieślakowski (3); Andrzej Krzepiński (s)	5:49.51	Canada; Doug Hamilton (2) (b); Robert Mills (3); Paul Douma; Mel LaForme (s)	5:50.52
M2+	Great Britain; Andy Holmes (b); Steve Redgrave (s); Patrick Sweeney (c)	6:51.66	Italy; Carmine Abbagnale (b); Giuseppe Abbagnale (s); Giuseppe Di Capua (c)	6:52.90	East Germany; Thomas Greiner (b); Olaf Förster (s); Udo Kühn (c)	6:54.58
M2-	Soviet Union; Yuriy Pimenov (b); Nikolay Pimenov (s)	6:42.37	Italy; Marco Romano (b); Pasquale Aiese (s)	6:44.52	East Germany; Dirk Rendant (b); Mario Kliesch (s)	6:44.70
M4+	East Germany; Frank Klawonn (b); Bernd Eichwurzel (2); Bernd Niesecke (3); Karsten Schmeling (s); Hendrik Reiher (c)	6:03.81	New Zealand; Nigel Atherfold (b); Bruce Holden (2); Greg Johnston (3); Chris White (s); Andrew Bird (c)	6:05.77	United States; Doug Burden (b); Chris Huntington (2); Kurt Bausback (3); John Walters (s); Jon Fish (c)	6:08.58
M4-	United States; Ted Swinford (b); Daniel Lyons (2); John Riley (3); Robert Espeseth (s)	6:03.53	West Germany; Norbert Keßlau (b); Volker Grabow (2); Jörg Puttlitz (3); Guido Grabow (s)	6:03.63	East Germany; Jörg Timmermann (b); Jens Luedecke (2); Ralf Brudel (3); Thomas-Robert Füting (s)	6:06.25
M8+	Australia; James Galloway (b); Malcolm Batten (2); Andrew Cooper (3); Mike McKay (4); Mark Doyle (5); James Tomkins (6); Ion Popa (7); Stephen Evans (s); Dale Caterson (c)	5:33.54	Soviet Union; Veniamin But (b); Jonas Pinskus (2); Aleksander Voloshin (3); Mykola Komarov (4); Pavlo Hurkovskiy (5); Viktor Diduk (6); Viktor Omelyanovich (7); Zigmantas Gudauskas (s); Hryhoriy Dmytrenko (c)	5:37.61	United States; Jonathan Kissick (b); John Smith (2); Thomas Kiefer (3); David Krmpotich (4); John Terwilliger (5); Edward Ives (6); Kevin Still (7); Andrew Sudduth (s); Mark Zembsch (c)	5:38.20
Men's lightweight events
LM1x	Australia; Peter Antonie	7:18.10	Denmark; Bjarne Eltang	7:18.12	United States; Glenn Florio	7:20.87
LM2x	Great Britain; Allan Whitwell (b); Carl Smith (s)	6:41.73	France; Luc Crispon (b); Thierry Renault (s)	6:44.76	Canada; Rob Haag (b); Cam Harvey (s)	6:45.46
LM4-	Italy; Franco Pantano (b); Dario Longhin (2); Nerio Gainotti (3); Mauro Torta (s)	6:18.26	Great Britain; Christopher Bates (b); Peter Haining (2); Neil Staite (3); Stuart Forbes (s)	6:20.79	Spain; Fernando Molina Castillo (b); José María de Marco Pérez (2); Carlos Muniesa (3); Alberto Molina Castillo (s)	6:21.68
LM8+	Italy; Maurizio Losi (b); Michele Savoia (2); Vittorio Torcellan (3); Massimo Lana (4); Stefano Spremberg (5); Carlo Gaddi (6); Andrea Re (7); Fabrizio Ravasi (s); Massimo Di Deco (c)	5:44.63	West Germany; Thomas Güntermann (b); Udo Hennig (2); Detlef Glitsch (3); Harald Galster (4); Alwin Otten (5); Frank Rogall (6); Andreas Hobler (7); Wolfgang Birkner (s); Torsten Kreis (c)	5:46.58	Denmark; Jørn Jørgensen (b); Kim Hagsted (2); Morten Espersen (3); Leif Jacobsen (4); Michael Sørensen (5); Flemming Jensen (6); Vagn Nielsen (7); Bent Fransson (s); Stephen Masters (c)	5:50.05

=== Women's events ===
Event:	Gold:	Time	Silver:	Time	Bronze:	Time
W1x	East Germany; Jutta Hampe	7:29.60	Bulgaria; Magdalena Georgieva	7:32.22	Soviet Union; Antonina Dumcheva	7:35.08
W2x	East Germany; Sylvia Schwabe (b); Beate Schramm (s)	6:57.71	Romania; Veronica Cogeanu (b); Elisabeta Lipă (s)	7:00.96	New Zealand; Robin Clarke (b); Stephanie Foster (s)	7:03.35
W4x	East Germany; Kerstin Pieloth (b); Birgit Peter (2); Kerstin Hinze (3); Jana Sorgers (s)	6:13.91	Romania; Anișoara Bălan (b); Doina Robu (2); Anișoara Sorohan (3); Maricica Țăran (s)	6:20.56	Netherlands; Marijke Zeekant (b); Marjan Pentenga (2); Nicolette Wessel (3); Jos Compaan (s)	6:24.85
W2-	Romania; Rodica Arba (b); Olga Homeghi (s)	7:12.20	Soviet Union; Galina Stepanova (b); Marina Pegova (s)	7:17.06	East Germany; Kathrin Haacker (b); Martina Walther (s)	7:18.84
W4+	Romania; Doina Bălan (b); Marioara Trașcă (2); Chira Stoean (3); Lucia Sauca (s); Viorica Ioja (c)	6:43.86	East Germany; Kerstin Spittler (b); Beatrix Schröer (2); Corinna Scheid (3); Carola Lichey (s); Sylvia Müller (c)	6:48.46	Canada; Jane Tregunno (b); Jennifer Walinga (2); Christina Clarke (3); Tricia Smith (s); Lesley Thompson-Willie (c)	6:51.27
W8+	Soviet Union; Elena Tereshina (b); Marina Suprun (2); Saria Sakirova (3); Olena Pukhaieva (4); Marina Znak (5); Irina Teterina (6); Lidiya Averyanova (7); Vida Cesiūnaitė (s); Valentina Khokhlova (c)	6:08.76	East Germany; Gerlinde Doberschütz (b); Anett Devantier (2); Kathrin Dienstbier (3); Ute Stange (4); Anja Kluge (5); Carola Hornig (6); Annekathrin Fercho (7); Ute Wild (s); Daniela Neunast (c)	6:09.77	Romania; Mihaela Armășescu (b); Camelia Diaconescu (2); Carolina Matei (3); Adriana Chelariu (4); Veronica Necula (5); Livia Țicanu (6); Florica Lavric (7); Herta Anitaș (s); Mariana Dorobantu (c)	6:11.26
Women's lightweight events
LW1x	Romania; Maria Sava	7:33.28	Belgium; Rita Defauw	7:35.24	United States; Angela Herron	7:37.11
LW2x	United States; Christine Ernst (b); Carey Sands-Marden (s)	7:17.13	Great Britain; Gillian Bond (b); Carol Ann Wood (s); Netherlands; Karin Hommers (b); Ellen Meliesie (s)	7:19.12	tie for second place	
LW4-	United States; Carolyn Mehaffey (b); Sandy Kendall (2); Mandy Kowal (3); Anne Martin (s)	6:53.92	Great Britain; Alexa Forbes (b); Gillian Hodges (2); Lin Clark (3); Judith Burne (s)	6:56.36	West Germany; Claudia Engels (b); Ute Zobeley (2); Sonja Petri (3); Evelyn Herwegh (s)	6:56.64
