= 1989 World Rowing Championships =

International rowing event

- Venue: Lake Bled
- Location: Bled, Yugoslavia
- Dates: 2 to 10 September

The 1989 World Rowing Championships were World Rowing Championships that were held from 2 to 10 September 1989 at Lake Bled near Bled in SR Slovenia, Yugoslavia.

== Medal summary ==
=== Men's events ===
Event	Gold	Time	Silver	Time	Bronze	Time
M1x	East Germany; Thomas Lange	6:58.14	Czechoslovakia; Václav Chalupa	7:01.05	Soviet Union; Jüri Jaanson	7:01.31
M2x	Norway; Rolf Thorsen; Lars Bjønness	6:23.40	Netherlands; Ronald Florijn; Nico Rienks	6:24.68	Austria; Christoph Zerbst; Arnold Jonke	6:25.80
M4x	Netherlands; Hans Kelderman; Koos Maasdijk; Herman van den Eerenbeemt; Rutger Arisz	6:03.99	Italy; Gianluca Farina; Filippo Soffici; Davide Tizzano; Giovanni Calabrese	6:04.26	Sweden; Per-Olof Claesson; David Svensson; Tommy Österlund; Fredrik Hultén	6:05.66
M2+	Italy; Carmine Abbagnale; Giuseppe Abbagnale; Giuseppe Di Capua	6:54.81	Romania; Dragoș Neagu; Ioan Șnep; Marin Gheorghe	6:56.90	Yugoslavia; Milan Janša; Robert Krašovec; Gorazd Slilvnik	6:57.97
M2-	East Germany; Thomas Jung; Uwe Kellner	6:39.95	Great Britain; Simon Berrisford; Steve Redgrave	6:42.84	Austria; Karl Sinzinger Jr (Note: Sinzinger Sr is shown in the World Rowing database as having competed in this race, but that's wrong. The senior would have been 48 at the time; the junior was competing at the 1988 and 1992 Olympics. Just one of the many errors in their database.); Hermann Bauer	6:43.40
M4+	Romania; Vasile Năstase; Dimitrie Popescu; Valentin Robu; Vasile Tomoiagă; Marin Gheorghe	6:14.90	Czechoslovakia; Michal Šubrt; Pavel Menšík; Dušan Vičík; Dušan Macháček; Jiří Pták	6:17.37	Great Britain; Stephen Turner; Matthew Pinsent; Gavin Stewart; Terence Dillon; Vaughan Thomas	6:17.57
M4-	East Germany; Jens Luedecke; Thomas Greiner; Ralf Brudel; Olaf Förster	6:06.94	United States; Raoul Rodriguez; Jack Rusher; Thomas Bohrer; Richard Kennelly	6:07.92	New Zealand; Bill Coventry; Ian Wright; Alastair Mackintosh; Campbell Clayton-Greene	6:08.63
M8+	West Germany; Jörg Puttlitz; Norbert Keßlau; Martin Steffes-Mies; Dirk Balster; Frank Dietrich; Marc Mauerwerk; Ansgar Wessling; Roland Baar; Manfred Klein	5:43.88	East Germany; Stefan Schulz; Mario Grüssel; Roland Schröder; Thomas Woddow; Mario Kliesch; Holger Rose; Thomas Bänsch; Hans Sennewald; Peter Thiede	5:45.70	Great Britain; Tim Foster; Matt Brittin; Jim Walker; Anton Obholzer; Jonny Singfield; Richard Phelps; Jonny Searle; Jonathan Hulls; Adrian Ellison	5:47.01
Men's lightweight events
LM1x	Netherlands; Frans Göbel	7:17.07	Belgium; Wim Van Belleghem	7:20.03	West Germany; Alwin Otten	7:21.80
LM2x	Austria; Christoph Schmölzer; Walter Rantasa	7:03.33	Spain; José María de Marco Pérez; Fernando Climent	7:03.53	Czechoslovakia; Petr Kováč; Tibor Groeppel	7:04.68
LM4x	West Germany; Peter Uhrig; Jan Fischer; Björn Gehlsen; Thomas Melges	6:04.78	Switzerland; Reto Fierz; Philipp Ferlber; Cirillo Ghielmetti; Markus Gier	6:07.24	France; Bruno Boucher; Bruno Lebeda; Rolland Galliac; Thierry Renault	6:07.50
LM4-	West Germany; Klaus Altena; Stephan Fahrig; Michael Buchheit; Bernhard Stomporowski	6:28.70	Italy; Nerio Gainotti; Alfredo Striani; Dario Longhin; Mauro Torta	6:32.36	Great Britain; Nicholas Strange; Nicholas Howe; Rob Williams; Stuart Forbes	6:34.35
LM8+	Italy; Enrico Barbaranelli; Roberto Romanini; Franco Falossi; Danilo Fraquelli; Vittorio Torcellan; Carlo Gaddi; Andrea Re; Fabrizio Ravasi; Giuseppe Lamberti	5:47.95	Denmark; Bo Vestergaard; Svend Blitskov; Jens Lindhardt; Lars Rasmussen; Flemming Meyer; Michael Sørensen; Vagn Nielsen; Niels Henriksen; Stephen Masters	5:49.38	West Germany; Alexander Trautmann; Felix Prinz; Detlef Glitsch; Ingo Grevenmeyer; Udo Hennig; Sebastian Franke; Thomas Palm; Erik Ring; Jörg Dederding	5:51.15

=== Women's events ===
Event	Gold	Time	Silver	Time	Bronze	Time
W1x	Romania; Elisabeta Lipă	7:27.96	East Germany; Birgit Peter	7:31.47	Hungary; Katalin Sarlós	7:34.15
W2x	East Germany; Jana Sorgers-Rau; Beate Schramm	7:01.71	Romania; Veronica Cochela; Elisabeta Lipă	7:07.32	Bulgaria; Pavlina Alexandrova; Magdalena Georgieva	7:11.55
W4x	East Germany; Kathrin Boron; Sybille Schmidt; Jutta Behrendt; Jana Thieme	6:16.62	Soviet Union; Nataliya Kvasha; Mariya Omelianovych; Svitlana Maziy; Irina Kalimbet	6:22.39	Bulgaria; Pavlina Alexandrova; Magdalena Georgieva; Galina Yahorova; Krasimira Tocheva	6:23.63
W2-	East Germany; Kathrin Haacker; Judith Zeidler	7:26.97	Romania; Doina Șnep-Bălan; Marioara Curelea	7:30.70	West Germany; Stefani Werremeier; Ingeburg Schwerzmann	7:31.13
W4-	East Germany; Christiane Harzendorf; Ina Justh; Annegret Strauch; Ute Wagner	6:45.81	China; Cao Mianying; Hu Yadong; Liu Xirong; Zhou Shouying	6:48.45	Romania; Adriana Chelariu; Mihaela Armășescu; Livia Leonte; Viorica Neculai	6:50.58
W8+	Romania; Anișoara Bălan; Marioara Curelea; Anca Tănase; Georgeta Soare; Adriana Chelariu; Viorica Neculai; Livia Leonte; Mihaela Armășescu; Ecaterina Oancia	6:07.92	East Germany; Liane Justh; Ute Wild; Ina Grapenthin; Annette Hohn; Anja Kluge; Katrin Schröder; Ramona Balthasar; Martina Walther; Daniela Neunast	6:08.19	China; Cao Mianying; Zhou Xiuhua; Liu Xirong; He Yanwen; Guo; Guo; Yang Xiao; Hu Yadong; Li Ronghua	6:11.84
Women's lightweight events
LW1x	United States; Kristine Karlson	8:01.12	Belgium; Rita Defauw	8:03.14	Netherlands; Laurien Vermulst	8:04.78
LW2x	United States; Carey Sands-Marden; Kristine Karlson	7:11.04	New Zealand; Philippa Baker; Linda de Jong	7:13.70	West Germany; Christiane Weber; Alrun Urbach	7:14.94
LW4-	China; Liang Sanmei; Zeng Meilan; Zhang Huajie; Lin Zhiai	7:01.70	Great Britain; Sue Key; Rachel Hirst; Joanna Toch; Katharine Brownlow	7:04.88	West Germany; Karin Zobeley; Cornelia Cichy; Ute Zobeley; Claudia Engels	7:06.12

== Medal table ==
Place	Nation	1st place, gold medalist(s)	2nd place, silver medalist(s)	3rd place, bronze medalist(s)	Total
1	East Germany	7	2	0	9
2	Romania	3	3	1	7
3	West Germany	3	1	5	9
4	Italy	2	2	0	4
5	Netherlands	2	1	1	4
6	United States	2	1	0	3
7	China	1	1	1	3
8	Austria	1	0	2	3
9	Norway	1	0	0	1
10	Great Britain	0	2	3	5
11	Czechoslovakia	0	2	1	3
12	Belgium	0	2	0	2
13	New Zealand	0	1	1	2
13	Soviet Union	0	1	1	2
15	Spain	0	1	0	1
15	Denmark	0	1	0	1
15	Switzerland	0	1	0	1
18	Bulgaria	0	0	2	2
19	France	0	0	1	1
19	Hungary	0	0	1	1
19	Sweden	0	0	1	1
19	Yugoslavia	0	0	1	1
Total		22	22	22	66
