= Jana Sorgers =

German rower (born 1967)

Personal information
- Born: 4 August 1967 (age 58) Neubrandenburg, East Germany
- Height: 182 cm (6 ft 0 in)
- Weight: 77 kg (170 lb)
- Spouse: Oliver Rau

Sport
- Sport: Rowing
- Club: SC Dynamo Berlin; SG Dynamo Potsdam
Medal record
Women's rowing
Representing East Germany
Olympic Games
Gold medal – first place	1988 Seoul	Quadruple sculls
World Rowing Championships
Gold medal – first place	1986 Nottingham	Quadruple sculls
Gold medal – first place	1987 Copenhagen	Quadruple sculls
Gold medal – first place	1989 Bled	Double sculls
Gold medal – first place	1990 Tasmania	Quadruple sculls
Representing Germany
Olympic Games
Gold medal – first place	1996 Atlanta	Quadruple sculls
World Rowing Championships
Gold medal – first place	1991 Wien	Quadruple sculls
Gold medal – first place	1994 Indianapolis	Quadruple sculls
Gold medal – first place	1995 Tampere	Quadruple sculls

Jana Sorgers (married name Jana Sorgers-Rau, born 4 August 1967) is a German rower who was a dominant sculler of her time, starting her career for the East German rowing team and continuing after the German reunification for the combined Germany for a few more years. Between 1986 and 1996, she won two Olympic gold medals, seven world championship titles, and nine national titles. Upon the conclusion of her successful career, she was awarded the Thomas Keller Medal by the International Rowing Federation (FISA) – the highest honour in rowing.

== Rowing career ==
=== Representing East Germany ===
Sorgers was born in 1967 in Neubrandenburg, Mecklenburg-Vorpommern, which at the time belonged to East Germany. She went to school in Pragsdorf where she was chosen for the rowing programme. From early on in her rowing career, Sorgers was a sculler. Her first club was Dynamo Neubrandenburg-Mitte and in 1981, she transferred to SC Dynamo Berlin. In 1982, she won the national junior championships in quad scull. Her first notable success came at the 1983 Spartakiad where she won gold in the double scull event partnered with Sybille Schmidt. At the 1984 World Rowing Junior Championships in Jönköping, Sweden, she became junior world champion in the coxed quad scull alongside Judith Zeidler. At the 1985 World Rowing Junior Championships in Brandenburg an der Havel, East Germany, she became junior world champion in the double scull partnered with Claudia Krüger with whom she had rowed since the beginning of the year; they dominated the final from the start and were more than 12 seconds ahead of the silver medallists.

Having won her second junior world championship title, Sorgers proclaimed that her biggest wish was to make it into the senior national team. At the beginning of the next season, she was chosen by chief women's coach Jürgen Gröbler for the team. Having just turned 19—the second-youngest on the East German team with Andreas Hajek a few months younger—she won her first senior world championship title at the 1986 World Rowing Championships in Nottingham in the United Kingdom in the quad scull alongside Kerstin Pieloth, Birgit Peter and Kerstin Hinze. In October 1986, she was awarded a Patriotic Order of Merit in gold (first class) for her sporting success. The team repeated this success at the 1987 World Rowing Championships in Copenhagen, Denmark, with Jutta Hampe having replaced Hinze and despite Hampe having caught a crab early in the final.

In January 1988, Sorgers was awarded the sports title "Honored Master of Sports". At the 1988 Summer Olympics in Seoul, Korea, the women from East Germany dominated the rowing competition by winning five of the six events. Sorgers won gold with the quad scull, alongside Kerstin Förster (née Pieloth), Kristina Mundt and Beate Schramm. Of the team of 23 female rowers, only two rowers did not win a medal – the coxless pair came fourth. In November 1988, Sorgers was awarded a Patriotic Order of Merit in gold (first class); this was the second time that she received this award.

For the 1989 rowing season, Sorgers teamed up with Schramm in a double scull. Early in the rowing season, they successfully competed against a team made of Jutta Behrendt (née Hampe) and Sybille Schmidt (Sorger's 1983 double scull partner). Sorgers and Schramm won the 1989 World Rowing Championships in Bled, Yugoslavia. For the 1990 rowing season, Sorgers was back in a quad with Schmidt, Kerstin Köppen and Krüger. This crew went to Tasmania in Australia for the 1990 World Rowing Championships where they became world champions. This was the last appearance of the East German national rowing team as the German reunification had happened a month earlier; the two German rowing federations were about to merge, too.

=== Representing Reunified Germany ===
The 1991 rowing season started with a national regatta for the small boat classes in Wedau where Sorgers competed in single scull and was beaten into second place by Schramm. A month later, an international regatta was held at the same venue where Sorgers teamed up with Sybille Schmidt in the double scull; they won their boat class by a margin of almost 8 seconds. The intention of the rowing officials had always been for Sorgers and Schmidt to be part of a quad scull for 1991 and after further qualification races, the 1990 team was reassembled, with Jana Thieme nearly having replaced Krüger. At the 1991 World Rowing Championships in Vienna, Austria, the quad scullers defended their world championship title.

In the 1992 season, Sorgers had a performance low. She did attend a three-week Olympic training camp in Mexico but then did not make the 1992 national team selection. She thus missed out qualification for the 1992 Summer Olympics. In 1993, Sorgers changed club and moved to SG Dynamo Potsdam but did not make it back into the national team. In December 1993, Sorgers was one of forty-five athletes to be awarded the Silbernes Lorbeerblatt ("Silver Laurel Leaf"), the highest sports award in Germany.

Sorgers made a comeback in the 1994 season. She made it back into the national team and with the quad scull, she won her sixth world championship title at the 1994 World Rowing Championships in Indianapolis, United States. The other team members that year were Mundt, Katrin Rutschow, and Kerstin Köppen-Kosbab. At the 1995 World Rowing Championships in Tampere, Finland, the quad scull defended its championship title, with Thieme having replaced Mundt.

Sorgers retired after winning a final gold medal in quad scull with Rutschow, Köppen, and Kathrin Boron at the 1996 Summer Olympics. After her retirement, she was awarded the Thomas Keller Medal.

=== National championships ===
In the GDR, Sorgers won her first national title in 1986 in the quad scull. In 1988, she became national champion in both the double and the quad scull. In 1989, she retained her title in the double scull. In 1990, she won her final East German title with the quad scull.

After the reunification, Sorgers won four national titles in quad scull: in 1991, 1994, 1995, and 1996.

== Life outside rowing ==
Sorgers trained as a medical technical assistant from 1984. In 1991, she trained to become a beautician.

She married rower Oliver Rau some time after her retirement from competitive rowing and has since been known as Jana Sorgers-Rau.

The couple have twin daughters (born c. 2000) and for many years, they lived in Bremen. Oliver Rau worked for sports club SV Werder Bremen from 1996 until 2017. He now works for Stiftung Deutsche Sporthilfe and they live in Bremen.
