= Mandi Kowal =

American rower

Personal information
- Born: June 16, 1963 (age 63)

Sport
- Sport: Rowing
Medal record
Women's rowing
Representing United States
World Rowing Championships
Gold medal – first place	1984 Montreal	LW8+
Gold medal – first place	1986 Nottingham	LW4-
Gold medal – first place	1987 Copenhagen	LW4-

Mandi Kowal (born June 16, 1963) is a retired American lightweight rower. She won a gold medal at the 1984 World Rowing Championships in Montreal, Canada, with the lightweight women's eight; this was the only year that this boat class competed at World Rowing Championships. She then switched to the lightweight women's four and became world champion at the 1986 World Rowing Championships, and again at the 1987 World Rowing Championships. At the 1988 World Rowing Championships in Milan, Italy, she came fourth.

Kowal resides in Iowa City.
