= Velotti =

Velotti is an Italian surname. Notable people with the surname include:

- Agustín Velotti (born 1992), Argentine tennis player
- Luigi Velotti, Italian coxswain
- Maria Velotti (1826–1886), founder of the Suore Francescane Adoratrici della Santa Croce
- Stephen A. Velotti
