= Dienstbier =

Dienstbier is a surname. Notable people with the surname include:

- Jiří Dienstbier (1937–2011), Czech politician and journalist
- Jiří Dienstbier Jr. (born 1969), Czech politician and lawyer, son of Jiří
- Kathrin Dienstbier, German rower
