= Leeanne Whitehouse =

Australian rower

Personal information
- Born: 1960 (age 65–66)

Sport
- Country: Australia
- Sport: Rowing
- Club: Dimboola Rowing Club <be> Banks Rowing Club; Melbourne University Boat Club
Medal record
Women's rowing
Representing Australia
World Rowing Championships
Silver medal – second place	1988 Milan	LW4-

Leeanne Whitehouse (born 1960) is an Australian former lightweight rower. She was a seven-time national champion and won a silver medal at the 1988 World Rowing Championships.

== Club and state rowing ==
Whitehouse started her rowing career as a schoolgirl in Dimboola, Victoria. Her senior club rowing was from the Dimboola Rowing Club and later in Melbourne from the Banks Rowing Club and then the Melbourne University Boat Club.

Whitehouse first made Victorian state representation as a 16 year old in 1974 Colts series raced against New Zealand.

In 1977 at the Australian Rowing Championships she won a women's junior four title in Dimboola colours with Pam Westendorf-Marshall with whom she would share later state and national honours.

She was selected for Victoria at the senior level in 1977 in the women's heavyweight four which contested the ULVA Trophy at the Interstate Regatta within the Australian Rowing Championships. After a significant break she returned to first class rowing in 1982 and in 1984 was selected in the Victorian lightweight coxless four which contested and won the Victoria Cup at the Interstate Regatta. She raced and won that event again in 1985, 1987 and 1988.

She rowed in Banks Rowing Club colours contesting Australian national titles in 1984 in a lightweight pair and to victory in a lightweight coxless four. She contested the coxless four again in 1985 and 1986 and the coxless pair in 1985. By 1987 she was representing Melbourne University and she contested both the pair and four titles at the Australian Rowing Championships in 1987 and 1988, winning the lightweight four championship in 1987.

== International representative rowing ==
Whitehouse made her Australian representative debut in the lightweight coxless four at the 1987 World Rowing Championships in Copenhagen. With Whitehouse in the two seat that four rowed to a fourth placing.

At the Milan 1988 Whitehouse rowed in the two seat of the lightweight coxless four which took the silver medal.
