= Erik Ring =

Erik Ring may refer to:

- Erik Ring (rower) (fl. 1987–1989), German rower
- Erik Ring (footballer) (born 2002), Swedish footballer
