= Marise Widmer =

American rower

Sport
- Sport: Rowing
Medal record
Women's rowing
Representing United States
World Rowing Championships
| Gold medal – first place | 1984 Montreal | LW8+ |
| Silver medal – second place | 1985 Hazewinkel | LW4- |

Marise Widmer is a retired American lightweight rower. She won a gold medal at the 1984 World Rowing Championships in Montreal, Canada, with the lightweight women's eight; this was the only year that this boat class competed at World Rowing Championships. At the 1985 World Rowing Championships in Hazewinkel, she won a silver medal with the lightweight women's four.
