= Fraquelli =

Fraquelli is a surname. Notable people with the surname include:

- Danilo Fraquelli (born 1968), Italian lightweight rower
- Silvio Fraquelli (born 1952), Italian pole vaulter
- Stefano Fraquelli (born 1972), Italian lightweight rower
