= Maurizio Losi =

Italian rower

Personal information
- Born: 12 September 1962 (age 63)

Sport
- Sport: Rowing
Medal record
Men's rowing
Representing Italy
World Rowing Championships
| Gold medal – first place | 1985 Hazewinkel | Lwt eight |
| Gold medal – first place | 1986 Nottingham | Lwt eight |
| Gold medal – first place | 1987 Copenhagen | Lwt eight |
| Gold medal – first place | 1988 Milan | Lwt eight |

Maurizio Losi (born 12 September 1962) is an Italian lightweight rower. He won a gold medal at the 1985 World Rowing Championships in Hazewinkel with the lightweight men's eight.
