= Thomas Jaekel =

German rower (born 1959)

Personal information
- Born: 21 February 1959 (age 67)

Sport
- Sport: Rowing
Medal record
Men's rowing
Representing West Germany
World Rowing Championships
Gold medal – first place	1985 Hazewinkel	Lwt men's four
Silver medal – second place	1984 Montreal	Lwt men's four

Thomas Jaekel (some sources say Jaeckel, born 21 February 1959) is a German lightweight rower. He won a gold medal at the 1985 World Rowing Championships in Hazewinkel with the lightweight men's four.
