= Luc Crispon =

French rower

Sport
- Sport: Rowing
Medal record
Men's rowing
Representing France
World Rowing Championships
Gold medal – first place	1985 Hazewinkel	Lwt double scull
Silver medal – second place	1983 Duisburg	Lwt double scull
Silver medal – second place	1986 Nottingham	Lwt double scull
Silver medal – second place	1987 Copenhagen	Lwt double scull

Luc Crispon is a French lightweight rower. He won a gold medal at the 1985 World Rowing Championships in Hazewinkel with the lightweight men's double scull.
