= Alwin Otten =

German rower

Personal information
- Born: 9 April 1963 (age 63)

Sport
- Sport: Rowing
Medal record
Men's rowing
Representing West Germany
World Rowing Championships
Gold medal – first place	1985 Hazewinkel	Lwt four
Gold medal – first place	1988 Milan	Lwt single scull
Silver medal – second place	1986 Nottingham	Lwt eight
Silver medal – second place	1987 Copenhagen	Lwt eight
Bronze medal – third place	1989 Bled	Lwt single scull

Alwin Otten (born 9 April 1963) is a German lightweight rower. He won a gold medal at the 1985 World Rowing Championships in Hazewinkel with the lightweight men's four.
