= Galina Anakhrieva =

Bulgarian rower

Personal information
- Nationality: Bulgarian
- Born: 12 March 1967 (age 59) Varna, Bulgaria

Sport
- Sport: Rowing
Medal record
Representing Bulgaria
World Rowing Championships
Silver medal – second place	1987 Copenhagen	Quadruple sculls
Bronze medal – third place	1989 Bled	Quadruple sculls
Summer Universiade
Gold medal – first place	1989 Duisburg	Quadruple sculls
Silver medal – second place	1987 Zagreb	Quadruple sculls

Galina Yahorova Anakhrieva (Bulgarian: Галина Яхорова•Анахриева) (born 12 March 1967) is a Bulgarian former rower. She competed at the 1988 Summer Olympics and the 1992 Summer Olympics.
