= Michele Savoia =

Italian rower

Personal information
- Born: 20 October 1963 (age 62)

Sport
- Sport: Rowing
Medal record
Men's rowing
Representing Italy
World Rowing Championships
Gold medal – first place	1985 Hazewinkel	Lwt eight
Gold medal – first place	1986 Nottingham	Lwt eight
Silver medal – second place	1984 Montreal	Lwt eight
Summer Universiade
Gold medal – first place	1987 Zagreb	Eight

Michele Savoia (born 20 October 1963) is an Italian lightweight rower. He won a gold medal at the 1985 World Rowing Championships in Hazewinkel with the lightweight men's eight.
