= Ruggero Verroca =

Italian rower

Personal information
- Born: 3 January 1961 (age 65) Bari, Italy

Sport
- Sport: Rowing
Medal record
Men's rowing
Representing Italy
World Rowing Championships
Gold medal – first place	1980 Hazewinkel	Lwt double scull
Gold medal – first place	1981 Munich	Lwt double scull
Gold medal – first place	1982 Lucerne	Lwt double scull
Gold medal – first place	1983 Duisburg	Lwt double scull
Gold medal – first place	1984 Montreal	Lwt double scull
Gold medal – first place	1985 Hazewinkel	Lwt single scull
Bronze medal – third place	1987 Copenhagen	Lwt single scull
Bronze medal – third place	1988 Milan	Lwt single scull
Summer Universiade
Silver medal – second place	1987 Zagreb	Lwt single scull

Ruggero Verroca (born 3 January 1961) is an Italian lightweight rower. He won a gold medal at the 1980 World Rowing Championships in Hazewinkel with the lightweight men's double scull.
