= Frank Rogall =

German rower

Personal information
- Born: 13 September 1961 (age 64)

Sport
- Sport: Rowing
Medal record
Men's rowing
Representing West Germany
World Rowing Championships
Gold medal – first place	1985 Hazewinkel	Lwt men's four
Silver medal – second place	1984 Montreal	Lwt men's four
Silver medal – second place	1986 Nottingham	Lwt men's eight

Frank Rogall (born 13 September 1961) is a German lightweight rower. He won a gold medal at the 1985 World Rowing Championships in Hazewinkel with the lightweight men's four.
