= Fabrizio Ravasi =

Italian rower

Personal information
- Born: 24 June 1965 (age 61) Milan, Italy

Sport
- Sport: Rowing
- Club: Fiamme Oro
Medal record
World Rowing Championships
Gold medal – first place	1985 Hazewinkel	Lwt eight
Gold medal – first place	1986 Nottingham	Lwt eight
Gold medal – first place	1987 Copenhagen	Lwt eight
Gold medal – first place	1988 Milan	Lwt eight
Gold medal – first place	1989 Bled	Lwt eight
Gold medal – first place	1990 Tasmania	Lwt eight
Gold medal – first place	1991 Vienna	Lwt eight
Silver medal – second place	1984 Montreal	Lwt eight
Bronze medal – third place	1994 Indianapolis	Lwt eight
Bronze medal – third place	1995 Tampere	Lwt eight

Fabrizio Ravasi (born 24 June 1965) is an Italian lightweight rower. He won a gold medal at the 1985 World Rowing Championships in Hazewinkel with the lightweight men's eight.
