= Dario Longhin =

Italian rower

Personal information
- Born: 11 January 1962 (age 64)

Sport
- Sport: Rowing
Medal record
Men's rowing
Representing Italy
World Rowing Championships
Gold medal – first place	1986 Nottingham	Lwt men's four
Gold medal – first place	1988 Milan	Lwt men's four
Silver medal – second place	1985 Hazewinkel	Lwt men's four
Silver medal – second place	1989 Bled	Lwt men's four
Bronze medal – third place	1987 Copenhagen	Lwt men's four

Dario Longhin (born 11 January 1962) is an Italian lightweight rower. He won a gold medal at the 1986 World Rowing Championships in Nottingham with the lightweight men's four.
