= Franco Zucchi (rower) =

Italian rower

Personal information
- Nationality: Italian
- Born: 16 December 1965 (age 60) Lecco, Italy

Sport
- Sport: Rowing
Medal record
Representing Italy
World Rowing Championships
Bronze medal – third place	1987 Copenhagen	Eights
Summer Universiade
Gold medal – first place	1989 Duisburg	Eights
Silver medal – second place	1987 Zagreb	Coxed fours
Mediterranean Games
Silver medal – second place	1991 Athens	Coxless pairs

Franco Zucchi (born 16 December 1965) is an Italian rower. He competed at the 1988 Summer Olympics and the 1996 Summer Olympics.
