= Sergey Kinyakin =

Medal record

Men's rowing

Representing the Soviet Union

Friendship Games
Gold medal – first place	1984 Moscow	Double sculls

World Rowing Championships
Gold medal – first place	1986 Nottingham	Quad sculls
Gold medal – first place	1987 Copenhagen	Quad sculls
Gold medal – first place	1990 Tasmania	Quad sculls
Gold medal – first place	1991 Vienna	Quad sculls

Sergey Kinyakin (Russian: Серге́й Кинякин; born 6 October 1961) is a rower from Belarus who competed for the Soviet Union.

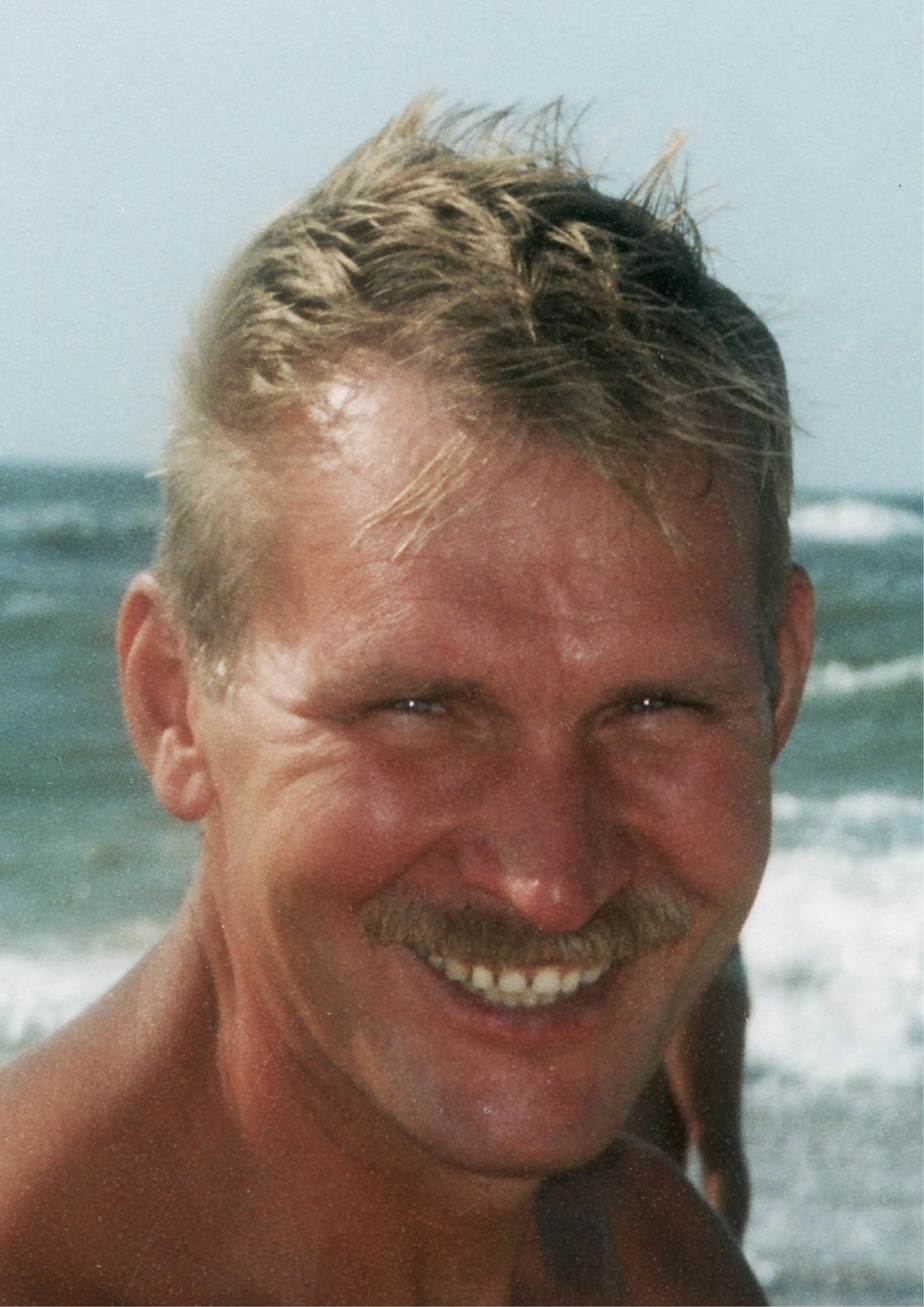
Sergey Kinyakin
