= Jens Luedecke =

East German rower (born 1950)

Sport
- Sport: Rowing
Medal record
Men's rowing
Representing East Germany
World Rowing Championships
Gold medal – first place	1987 Copenhagen	Four
Gold medal – first place	1989 Bled	Four
Bronze medal – third place	1986 Nottingham	Four
Bronze medal – third place	1990 Tasmania	Four

Jens Luedecke is an East German rower. He won a gold medal at the 1987 World Rowing Championships in Copenhagen with the men's coxless four, and became world champion in the same boat class for a second time in 1989.
