= Rowing at the 1987 Summer Universiade =

Rowing regatta

Rowing at the XIV Summer Universiade
- Venue: Zagreb, (Socialist Federal Republic of Yugoslavia) Yugoslavia

Rowing was contested at the 1987 Summer Universiade in Zagreb in Yugoslavia.

== Medal summary ==
=== Medal table ===
Rank	Nation	Gold	Silver	Bronze	Total
1	Romania	5	1	0	6
2	Italy	3	2	2	7
3	West Germany	1	3	1	5
4	Bulgaria	1	3	0	4
5	Netherlands	1	1	2	4
6	China	1	0	1	2
6	East Germany	1	0	1	2
8	Poland	1	0	0	1
9	Yugoslavia	0	1	2	3
10	United States	0	1	1	2
11	Brazil	0	1	0	1
11	Soviet Union	0	1	0	1
13	Canada	0	0	3	3
14	France	0	0	1	1
Totals (14 entries)		14	14	14	42

=== Men's events ===
Event	Gold	Silver	Bronze
Single sculls	Steffen Zühlke; East Germany; 7:28.57	Vasil Radev; Bulgaria; 7:35.34	Marco Savino; Italy; 7:38.85
Quadruple sculls	Poland (POL); Tomasz Świątek; Mirosław Mruk; Sławomir Cieślakowski; Andrzej Krzepiński; 6:15.07	Soviet Union (URS); Pavel Krupko; Gennady Martisov; Oleg Kiz; Valery Andrusenko; 6:18.52	Yugoslavia (YUG); Marko Banović; Goran Mikalacki; Davor Duricković; Nikša Prizmić; 6:21.40
Lightweight single sculls	Frans Göbel; Netherlands; 7:32.98	Ruggero Verroca; Italy; 7:33.80	John Murphy; Canada; 7:35.21
Lightweight double sculls	Italy (ITA); Giovanni Calabrese; Enrico Gandola; 6:56.09	West Germany (FRG); Roland Ehrenfels; Hartmut Schäfer; 7:00.88	Netherlands (NED); Theo Nieuweboer; Jan van Bekkum; 7:08.13
Lightweight coxless four	Italy (ITA); Marco Bordin; Franco Pantano; Nerio Gainotti; Mauro Torta; 6:43.29	West Germany (FRG); Uwe-Karl Bender; Jürgen Schäfer; Norbert Schmidt; Herbert Rapp; 6:50.91	France (FRA); Luc Montignon; Stephane Hennebert; Christophe Pacchiano; Denis Viquerat; 6:52.34
Coxless pair	Romania (ROU); Dragoș Neagu; Dănuț Dobre; 7:12.42	Brazil (BRA); Ricardo de Carvalho; Ronaldo de Carvalho; 7:19.92	Italy (ITA); Marco Romano; Pasquale Aiese; 7:23.97
Coxed four	Romania (ROU); Valentin Robu; Dorel Nastase; Vasile Tomoiagă; Dimitrie Popescu; Florin Micu; 6:36.08	Italy (ITA); Giovanni Miccoli; Antonio Maurogiovanni; Giuseppe Carrando; Giovanni Suarez; Franco Zucchi; 6:38.75	Canada (CAN); Robert Marland; Jamie Schaffer; Harold Backer; Terrence Paul; Brian Saunderson; 6:40.83
Eight	Italy (ITA); Sergio Caropreso; Michele Savoia; Walter Molea; Giuseppe Di Palo; Leonardo Massa; Alberto Mancini; Paolo Marostica; Piero Carletto; Vincenzo Buttino; 6:04.23	West Germany (FRG); Uwe-Wolfgang Birkner; Harald Galster; Detlef Glitsch; Udo Hennig; Thomas Palm; Erik Ring; Andreas Hobler; Carsten Krüger; Thorsten Kreis; 6:05.36	Yugoslavia (YUG); Dragan Bicanin; Mirko Milakov; Milan Janša; Robert Krašovec; Sašo Mirjanič; Sadik Mujkič; Bojan Prešern; Daniel Ferčej; Saša Mimić; 6:06.00

=== Women's events ===
Event	Gold	Silver	Bronze
Single sculls	Marioara Popescu; Romania; 7:35.37	Magdalena Georgieva; Bulgaria; 7:37.19	Silken Laumann; Canada; 7:53.32
Quadruple sculls	Romania (ROU); Anişoara Bălan; Veronica Cogeanu; Doina Ciucanu; Anişoara Minea; 6:32.02	Bulgaria (BUL); Violeta Ninova; Lalka Berberova; Galina Anakhrieva; Stefka Madina; 6:37.79	East Germany (GDR); Kriemhild Gierke; Sybille Schmidt; Ramona Balthasar; Jana Geracik; 6:41.00
Lightweight single sculls	Maria Sava; Romania; 8:01.16	Sanja Vermezović; Yugoslavia; 8:24.35	Kris Karlson; United States; 8:28.08
Lightweight double sculls	China (CHN); Liang Sanmei; Zeng Meilan; 7:43.02	United States (USA); Nancy Dimich; Cornelia Streeter; 7:44.98	West Germany (FRG); Ute-Lucie Zobeley; Claudia Engels; 7:51.18
Lightweight coxless four	West Germany (FRG); Kristiane Zimmer; Evelyn Herwegh; Monika Wolf; Claudia Fachinger; 7:23.56	Netherlands (NED); Daphne van der Pool; Ans van Dalen; Ada van der Graaff; Yvette van Kooijk; 7:29.77	China (CHN); Qui Shuli; Wang Renjao; Wang Pingmei; Yi Duanxiang; 7:34.31
Coxless pair	Bulgaria (BUL); Violeta Zareva; Teodora Zareva; 7:40.01	Romania (ROU); Mihaela Armășescu; Adriana Chelariu; 7:42.98	Netherlands (NED); Greet Hellemans; Harriet van Ettekoven; 7:49.20
