= Thomas Melges =

German lightweight rower

Personal information
- Born: 1 January 1969 (age 57)

Sport
- Sport: Rowing
Medal record
Men's rowing
World Rowing Championships
Representing West Germany
Gold medal – first place	1989 Bled	Lwt quad scull
Representing Germany
Bronze medal – third place	1992 Montreal	Lwt eight

Thomas Melges (born 1 January 1969) is a German lightweight rower. He won a gold medal at the 1989 World Rowing Championships in Bled with the lightweight men's quadruple scull.
