= Klaus Altena =

German rower (born 1962)

Personal information
- Born: 19 November 1962 (age 63)
- Height: 181 cm (5 ft 11 in)

Sport
- Sport: Rowing
- Club: RVO, RaW, RRC
Medal record
Men's rowing
World Rowing Championships
Representing West Germany
Gold medal – first place	1989 Bled	Lwt men's four
Gold medal – first place	1990 Tasmania	Lwt men's four
Representing Germany
Bronze medal – third place	1992 Montreal	Lwt men's eight

Klaus Altena (born 19 November 1962) is a German lightweight rower. He won a gold medal at the 1989 World Rowing Championships in Bled, Slovenia and 1990 in Tasmania, Australia with the lightweight men's four.

He also keeps a record with the lightweight men's eight: 5:30.28 min.
