= Enrico Gandola =

Italian rower

Personal information
- Born: 11 June 1967 (age 59) Udine, Italy

Sport
- Sport: Rowing
Medal record
Men's rowing
Representing Italy
World Rowing Championships
Gold medal – first place	1987 Copenhagen	Lwt double scull
Gold medal – first place	1988 Milan	Lwt double scull
Silver medal – second place	1993 Račice	Lwt four
Silver medal – second place	1994 Indianapolis	Lwt four
Bronze medal – third place	1984 Jonkoping	Junior double scull
Summer Universiade
Gold medal – first place	1987 Zagreb	Lwt double scull

Enrico Gandola (born 11 June 1967) is an Italian lightweight rower. He won gold medals at the 1987 World Rowing Championships in Copenhagen with the lightweight men's double scull (Calabrese-Gandola), and at the 1988 World Rowing Championships in Milan with the lightweight men's double scull (Gandola Esposito).

He is a former president of the Italian Rowing Federation (2008–2012).
