= Denise Rennex =

Australian rower

Personal information
- Education: Australian National University

Sport
- Country: Australia
- Sport: Rowing
- Club: ANU Boat Club
Medal record
Women's rowing
Representing Australia
World Rowing Championships
Bronze medal – third place	1985 Hazewinkel	LW4-

Denise Rennex is an Australian former lightweight rower. She was a national varsity champion and won a bronze medal at the 1985 World Championships.

== Club and state rowing ==
Rennex's senior club rowing was from the Australian National University Boat Club.

Rennex first made New South Wales state representation in 1983 in the lightweight four which contested the Victoria Cup at the Interstate Regatta within the Australian Rowing Championships. She raced that event again in 1985 when she stroked the New South Wales four.

In ANU colours she contested national championship events at the Australian Rowing Championships. She stroked a composite Australian Capital Territory eight competing for the open women's eight title in 1982. In 1983 she was in the two seat of a composite eight comprising the New South Wales state selected lightweight plus heavyweight women's fours. In 1985 she rowed in a composite eight containing the New South Wales lightweight four in the bow end and the Victorian lightweight four in the stern. They were unable to beat a heavyweight Melbourne University eight to the championship title.

Rennex was the Australian National University's single sculling entrant at the 1982 Australian Intervarsity Championships. In 1983 she won the coxless pair university title at the Intervarsity Championships.

== International representative rowing ==
Rennex made her Australian representative debut at the 1985 World Rowing Championships in Hazelwinkel - the first Rowing World Championships to include lightweight events within the overall programme. Rennex rowed in the three seat of the lightweight coxless four which took the bronze medal.
