= Franco Pantano =

Italian rower

Personal information
- Born: 22 July 1960 (age 66)

Sport
- Sport: Rowing
Medal record
Men's rowing
Representing Italy
World Championships
Gold medal – first place	1982 Lucerne	Lwt men's eight
Gold medal – first place	1986 Nottingham	Lwt men's four
Silver medal – second place	1981 Munich	Lwt men's eight
Silver medal – second place	1985 Hazewinkel	Lwt men's four
Bronze medal – third place	1987 Copenhagen	Lwt men's four
Summer Universiade
Gold medal – first place	1987 Zagreb	Lwt men's fours

Franco Pantano (born 22 July 1960) is an Italian lightweight rower. He won a gold medal at the 1986 World Rowing Championships in Nottingham with the lightweight men's four.
