= Thomas Jung (rower) =

German rower (born 1969)

Medal record

Men's rowing

World Rowing Championships

Representing East Germany
Gold medal – first place	1989 Bled	Coxless pair
Gold medal – first place	1990 Tasmania	Coxless pair

Representing Germany
Silver medal – second place	1998 Cologne	Eight

Thomas Jung (born 9 January 1969) is a German rower who competed for the SC Dynamo Berlin / Sportvereinigung (SV) Dynamo.

Jung was born in 1969 in Berlin. He won the medals at the international rowing competitions.
