= José María de Marco Pérez =

Spanish rower

Personal information
- Born: 23 June 1963 (age 63) Seville, Spain

Sport
- Sport: Rowing
Medal record
Men's rowing
Representing Spain
World Rowing Championships
Gold medal – first place	1983 Duisburg	Lwt men's four
Gold medal – first place	1984 Montreal	Lwt men's four
Silver medal – second place	1982 Lucerne	Lwt men's four
Silver medal – second place	1989 Bled	Lwt men's double scull
Bronze medal – third place	1986 Nottingham	Lwt men's four
Bronze medal – third place	1991 Vienna	Lwt men's four
Summer Universiade
Bronze medal – third place	1989 Duisburg	Lwt single sculls
Mediterranean Games
Silver medal – second place	1991 Athens	Coxless fours

José María de Marco Pérez (born 23 June 1963) is a Spanish lightweight rower. He won a gold medal at the 1983 World Rowing Championships in Duisburg with the lightweight men's four. He competed at the 1992 Summer Olympics and the 1996 Summer Olympics.
