= Liang Sanmei =

Chinese rower

Personal information
- Nationality: Chinese

Sport
- Sport: Rowing
Medal record
Representing China
World Rowing Championships
Gold medal – first place	1988 Milan	Lwt coxless four
Gold medal – first place	1989 Bled	Lwt coxless four
Gold medal – first place	1991 Vienna	Lwt coxless four
Bronze medal – third place	1990 Tasmania	Lwt coxless four
Asian Games
Gold medal – first place	1990 Beijing	Lwt single sculls
Summer Universiade
Gold medal – first place	1987 Zagreb	Lwt double sculls
Gold medal – first place	1989 Duisburg	Lwt double sculls

Liang Sanmei is a Chinese rower.

== Career ==
Liang has won medals in the lightweight women's four at World Rowing Championships in 1988 (gold), 1989 (gold), 1990 (bronze), and 1991 (gold).
