= Sebastiano Zanetti =

Italian rowing cox

Sport
- Sport: Rowing
Medal record
Men's rowing
Representing Italy
World Rowing Championships
Gold medal – first place	1987 Copenhagen	Lwt eight

Sebastiano Zanetti is an Italian coxswain. He won a gold medal at the 1987 World Rowing Championships in Copenhagen with the lightweight men's eight.
