= Thomas Bänsch =

East German rower

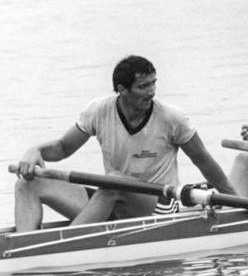
- Thomas Bänsch in 1985

Sport
- Sport: Rowing
- Club: SC Einheit Dresden
Medal record
Men's rowing
Representing East Germany
Friendship Games
Silver medal – second place	1984 Moscow	Coxless four
World Rowing Championships
Bronze medal – third place	1985 Hazewinkel	Coxless four
Silver medal – second place	1987 Copenhagen	Eight
Silver medal – second place	1989 Bled	Eight
Bronze medal – third place	1990 Tasmania	Eight

Thomas Bänsch is a retired East German rower who won two silver and two bronze medals at the world championships of 1985–1990.
