= Frans Göbel =

Dutch rower (born 1959)

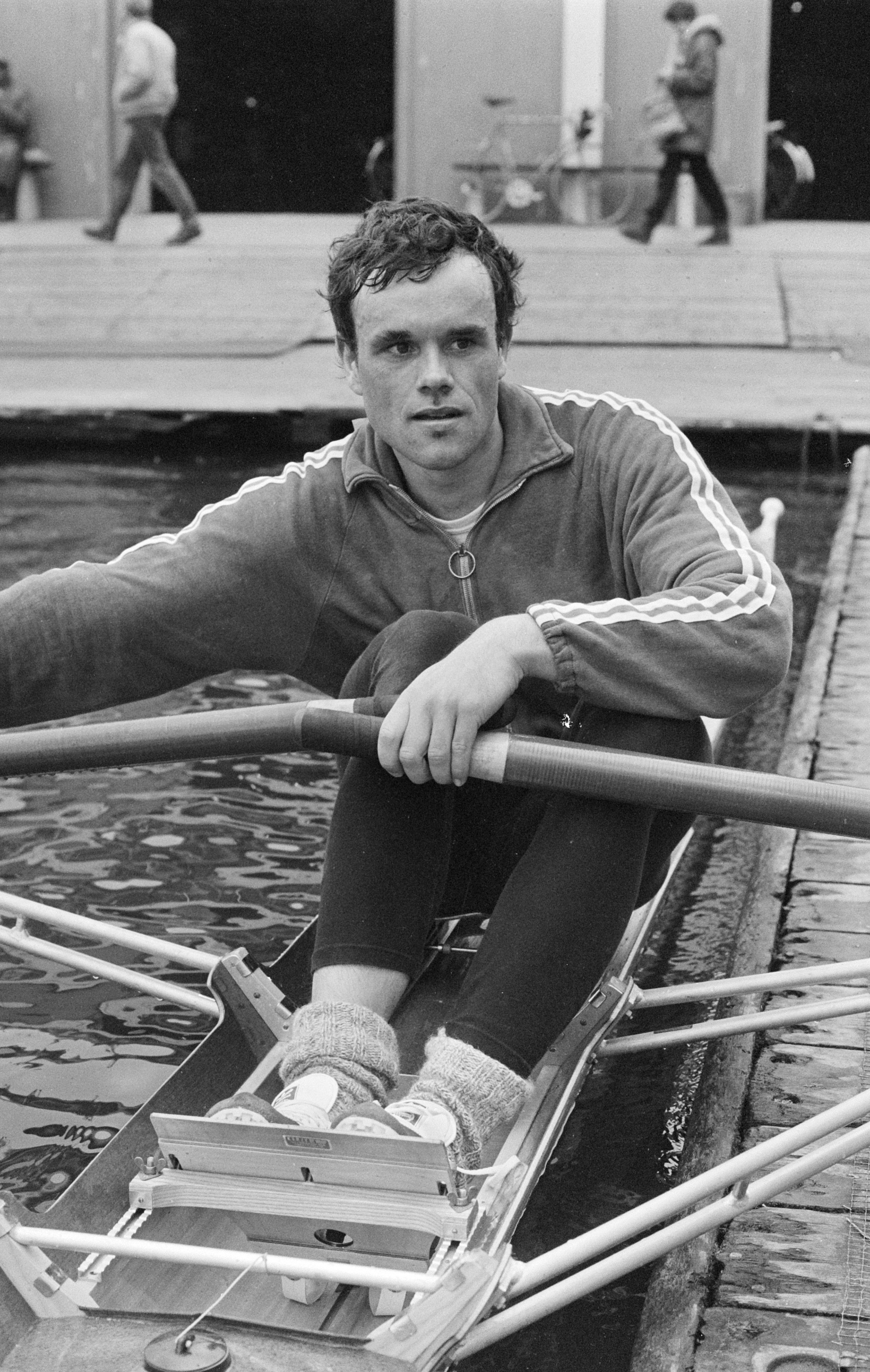
- Frans Göbel in 1984

Personal information
- Born: 11 July 1959 (age 67) Amsterdam, the Netherlands
- Height: 1.81 m (5 ft 11 in)
- Weight: 81 kg (179 lb)

Sport
- Sport: Rowing
- Club: De Hoop, Amsterdam
Medal record
Men's rowing
Representing the Netherlands
World Rowing Championships
Gold medal – first place	1989 Bled	LM1x
Gold medal – first place	1990 Tasmania	LM1x
Silver medal – second place	1988 Milan	LM1x
Summer Universiade
Gold medal – first place	1987 Zagreb	LM1x

Frans Christiaan Cornelis Göbel (born 11 July 1959) is a retired Dutch rower who specialized in the single sculls. In this event he won lightweight rowing world titles in 1989 and 1990 and finished second in 1988. He competed at the 1984 and 1992 Olympics and finished in 9th and 16th place, respectively.
