= Giuseppe Lamberti =

Italian coxswain (born 1973)

Personal information
- Born: 12 November 1973 (age 52)

Sport
- Sport: Rowing
Medal record
Men's rowing
Representing Italy
World Rowing Championships
Gold medal – first place	1989 Bled	Lwt eight
Gold medal – first place	1990 Tasmania	Lwt eight
World Rowing Junior Championships
Bronze medal – third place	1988 Milan	Jun coxed four

Giuseppe Lamberti (born 12 November 1973) is an Italian coxswain.

Lamberti was born in 1973. He won bronze at the 1988 World Rowing Junior Championships in Milan with the junior men's coxed four. He won a gold medal at the 1989 World Rowing Championships in Bled with the lightweight men's eight.
