= Carolyn Mehaffey =

American rower

Medal record

Women's rowing

Representing the United States

World Championships
Gold medal – first place	1986 Nottingham	LW4-

Carolyn Mehaffey is an American rower. In the 1986 World Rowing Championships she won gold in the women's lightweight coxless four event.
