= Bo Vestergaard =

Danish rower

Personal information
- Born: 27 November 1965 (age 60)

Sport
- Sport: Rowing
Medal record
Men's rowing
Representing Denmark
World Rowing Championships
Gold medal – first place	1992 Montreal	Lwt eight
Gold medal – first place	1995 Tampere	Lwt eight
Silver medal – second place	1989 Bled	Lwt eight
Silver medal – second place	1990 Tasmania	Lwt eight
Silver medal – second place	1993 Račice	Lwt eight
Silver medal – second place	1994 Indianapolis	Lwt eight
Bronze medal – third place	1988 Milan	Lwt eight

Bo Vestergaard (born 27 November 1965) is a Danish lightweight rower. He won a gold medal at the 1992 World Rowing Championships in Montreal with the lightweight men's eight.
