= Ted Swinford =

American rower

Sport
- Sport: Rowing
Medal record
Men's rowing
Representing the United States
World Rowing Championships
Gold medal – first place	1986 Nottingham	Four
Bronze medal – third place	1987 Copenhagen	Four

Ted Swinford is an American rower. He won a gold medal at the 1986 World Rowing Championships in Nottingham with the men's coxless four. He was inducted in the National Rowing Hall of Fame (Stoningham, CT) in January 1997.
