= Michael O'Gorman (rowing) =

American rower (1965–2018)

Personal information
- Born: August 16, 1965 Massachusetts, U.S.
- Died: September 2018 (aged 53)
Medal record
Men's rowing
Representing the United States
World Rowing Championships
Bronze medal – third place	1987 Copenhagen	Lwt eight
Silver medal – second place	1988 Milan	Lwt eight
Bronze medal – third place	1991 Vienna	Lwt eight

Michael O'Gorman (August 16, 1965 – September 2018) was an American coxswain who won 3 world championship medals. He was born in Massachusetts, grew up in Florida, and was then educated at the University of Pennsylvania. He coxed the US lightweight eight at the World Rowing Championships from 1987 to 1992, winning bronze in 1987, silver in 1988, and bronze again in 1991. He subsequently became a coach, including at Vesper Boat Club, Stetson University, and the Chicago Rowing Center.
