= Vittorio Torcellan =

Italian rower

Personal information
- Born: 9 August 1962 (age 63)

Sport
- Sport: Rowing
Medal record
Men's rowing
Representing Italy
World Championships
Gold medal – first place	1985 Hazewinkel	Lwt eight
Gold medal – first place	1986 Nottingham	Lwt eight
Gold medal – first place	1987 Copenhagen	Lwt eight
Gold medal – first place	1988 Milan	Lwt eight
Gold medal – first place	1989 Bled	Lwt eight
Silver medal – second place	1984 Montreal	Lwt eight

Vittorio Torcellan (born 9 August 1962) is an Italian lightweight rower. He won a gold medal at the 1985 World Rowing Championships in Hazewinkel with the lightweight men's eight.
