= Claudia Waldi =

German rower

Personal information
- Born: 29 July 1964 (age 62) Leverkusen, West Germany

Sport
- Sport: Rowing
Medal record
Representing West Germany
World Championships
Gold medal – first place	1984 Montreal	LW4-
Gold medal – first place	1985 Hazewinkel	LW4-
Bronze medal – third place	1986 Nottingham	LW4-
Bronze medal – third place	1988 Milan	LW4-
Bronze medal – third place	1989 Bled	LW4-
Summer Universiade
Bronze medal – third place	1987 Zagreb	LW2x
Representing Germany
World Championships
Gold medal – first place	1991 Vienna	LW2x
Gold medal – first place	1992 Montreal	LW2x

Claudia Waldi (née Engels, born 29 July 1964) is a German rower. Before her wedding between the 1989 and 1990 rowing seasons, she competed under her maiden name.
