= Jutta Behrendt =

East German rower (born 1960)

Medal record

Women's rowing

Representing East Germany

Olympic Games
Gold medal – first place	1988 Seoul	Single sculls

World Rowing Championships
Gold medal – first place	1983 Duisburg	Single sculls
Gold medal – first place	1985 Hazewinkel	Quad sculls
Gold medal – first place	1986 Nottingham	Single sculls
Gold medal – first place	1987 Copenhagen	Quad sculls
Gold medal – first place	1989 Bled	Quad sculls
Silver medal – second place	1981 Munich	Double sculls
Silver medal – second place	1982 Lucerne	Coxed quad sculls

Jutta Behrendt (née Hampe; 15 November 1960 in Berlin) is a German competition rower, world champion and Olympic champion.

Hampe competed for the SC Dynamo Berlin / Sportvereinigung (SV) Dynamo and received a gold medal in single sculls at the 1988 Summer Olympics in Seoul. In October 1986, she was awarded a Star of People's Friendship in gold (second class) for her sporting success.

In the 1987 season, Hampe was displaced from the single scull by Martina Schröter who had returned after a break. Hampe joined the quad scull team, herself having replaced Kerstin Hinze. She competed under her maiden name until the end of the 1987 rowing season and had married by mid-October 1987. Her husband, Dirk Behrendt, is a rowing trainer.
