= Zeng Meilan =

Chinese rower

Sport
- Sport: Rowing
Medal record
Representing China
World Rowing Championships
Gold medal – first place	1988 Milan	Lwt coxless four
Gold medal – first place	1989 Bled	Lwt coxless four
Bronze medal – third place	1990 Tasmania	Lwt coxless four
Asian Games
Gold medal – first place	1990 Beijing	Lwt coxless four
Summer Universiade
Gold medal – first place	1987 Zagreb	Lwt double sculls
Silver medal – second place	1989 Duisburg	Coxless pairs

Zeng Meilan is a Chinese rower. She has won medals in the lightweight women's four at World Rowing Championships in 1988 (gold), 1989 (gold), and 1990 (bronze).
