= Thomas Greiner =

East German rower

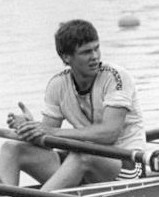
- Thomas Greiner (1985)

Personal information
- Born: 3 May 1963 (age 63) Dresden, East Germany
- Height: 1.93 m (6 ft 4 in)
- Weight: 90 kg (198 lb)

Sport
- Sport: Rowing
- Club: SC Einheit Dresden
Medal record
Men's rowing
Representing East Germany
Olympic Games
Gold medal – first place	1988 Seoul	Coxless four
Friendship Games
Silver medal – second place	1984 Moscow	Coxless four
World Rowing Championships
Gold medal – first place	1982 Lucerne	Coxed four
Gold medal – first place	1983 Dusiburg	Coxed pair
Gold medal – first place	1987 Copenhagen	Coxless four
Gold medal – first place	1989 Bled	Coxless four
Bronze medal – third place	1985 Hazewinkel	Coxless four
Bronze medal – third place	1986 Nottingham	Coxed pair
Bronze medal – third place	1990 Tasmania	Coxless four

Thomas Greiner (born 3 May 1963) is a retired German rower who won a gold medal in the coxless fours at the 1988 Summer Olympics. He also won four gold and three bronze medals in various events at the world championships from 1982 to 1990.

Greiner is a tax consultant and an international rowing referee. He is married and has two children. For his 1988 Olympic achievement, he was awarded the Patriotic Order of Merit. In 1991, Greiner became the second person to receive the Thomas Keller Medal, the highest honour in rowing.
