= Gerd Meyer =

German lightweight rower (born 1963)

Personal information
- Born: 5 October 1963 (age 62)

Sport
- Sport: Rowing
Medal record
Men's rowing
Representing West Germany
World Rowing Championships
Gold medal – first place	1987 Copenhagen	Lwt men's four
Bronze medal – third place	1988 Milan	Lwt men's four

Gerd Meyer (born 5 October 1963) is a German lightweight rower. He won a gold medal at the 1987 World Rowing Championships in Copenhagen with the lightweight men's four.
