= Lucia Toader =

Romanian rower

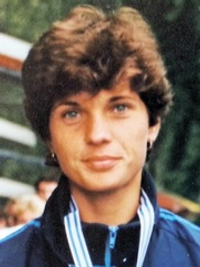

Personal information
- Born: 30 September 1960 Coroiești, Romania
- Died: 8 December 2013 (aged 53) Pitești, Romania
- Height: 179 cm (5 ft 10 in)
- Weight: 78 kg (172 lb)

Sport
- Sport: Rowing
- Club: Sportiv Metalul; CSA Steaua Bucharest
Medal record
Representing Romania
Olympic Games
Silver medal – second place	1984 Los Angeles	Eight
World Rowing Championships
Bronze medal – third place	1985 Hazewinkel	Eight
Gold medal – first place	1986 Nottingham	Coxed four
Gold medal – first place	1987 Copenhagen	Eight

Lucia Toader (née Sauca; 30 September 1960 – December 2013) was a Romanian rower. She won an Olympic silver medal in the women's eight in 1984 and world titles in the coxed four boat class in 1986 and in the eight in 1987. She competed at the 1986 World Rowing Championships under her married name.
