= Chris Ernst =

American rower (born 1953/54)

Personal information
- Nationality: American
- Born: 1953 or 1954 (age 72–73) Cambridge, Massachusetts

Sport
- Sport: Rowing
- College team: Yale
Medal record
Women's rowing
Representing United States
World Championships
Silver medal – second place	1975 Nottingham	Eight
Gold medal – first place	1986 Nottingham	LW2x
Bronze medal – third place	1987 Copenhagen	LW2x

Christine Ernst is an American former rower. She was in 1986 World Rowing Championships and won gold in the women's lightweight doubles event. She led protest a 1976 at Yale University about the inadequate facilities provided to the women's crew—the first such challenge under Title IX.

== Early life ==
Ernst was born in Cambridge, Massachusetts. Her family moved to Scituate, Massachusetts when she was a young child. She trained in gymnastics where she challenged, and beat, the boys in her high school in arm wrestling matches in order to get use of the equipment.

She attended Yale University, receiving an undergraduate degree in 1976.

== Rowing ==
Ernst began rowing her sophomore year in college, and by her senior year she was captain of the women's crew (rowing team). However, there was no locker room available for the women's team, so they had to wait on the bus after practice while the men showered before they could return to campus.

Ernst leads the protest to Joni Barnett, 1976.

Ernst led a protest regarding the discrepancy in facilities for the women's crew compared to the men's team. In early 1976, the nineteen members of the Yale women's crew wrote "Title IX" on their bodies and went into athletic director Joni Barnett's office and took off their clothes, and then Ernst read a statement about the way they were being treated that began, "These are the bodies Yale is exploiting…" This protest was noted by newspapers around the world, including The New York Times. By 1977, a women's locker room was added to Yale's boathouse.

After graduating from college, she was an assistant rowing coach at Yale and shifted her focus to sculling, rowing with two oars. She was an alternate on the United States Olympic team for the 1976 Summer Olympics, the first year where women's rowing was an option. She also participated as an alternate in the 1984 Summer Olympics. In 1986 she won the world championship in lightweight double sculls competing with Carrey Beth Sands, the first time the United States won a gold medal in the event. In 1988 Ernst refused to participate in the 1988 Summer Olympics because of her opposition to the political situation regarding South Korea.

== Subsequent years ==
In 1980, Ernst was the first woman to become a unionized plumber in New Haven; as of 1982 she was one of four female plumbers in southern Connecticut. As of 2012 she owns a plumbing company, Pipelines, in Roslindale, Massachusetts.

In 1999, Mary Mazzio produced a documentary titled A Hero For Daisy which portrays Ernst, her rowing career, and her role in the 1976 protest at Yale.

In 2012, Ernst was honored at New England Sports Museum’s “The Tradition" in honor of her role in leading the Yale protest.

== See also ==
- Mary I. O'Connor
