= Kerstin Toußaint =

German rower

Medal record

Representing East Germany

World Rowing Championships
Bronze medal – third place	Hazewinkel 1985	W2-

Kerstin Toußaint (also shown as Toussaint) is a German rower, who competed for the SG Dynamo Potsdam / Sportvereinigung (SV) Dynamo. She won the medals at the international rowing competitions, including a bronze medal at the 1985 World Rowing Championships.
