= Sabino Bellomo =

Italian lightweight rower

Personal information
- Born: 1 January 1964 (age 62)

Sport
- Sport: Rowing
Medal record
Men's rowing
Representing Italy
World Championships
Gold medal – first place	1988 Milan	Lwt eight
Silver medal – second place	1991 Vienna	Lwt four
Silver medal – second place	1992 Montreal	Lwt four
Bronze medal – third place	1993 Račice	Lwt four
Bronze medal – third place	1995 Tampere	Lwt eight

Sabino Bellomo (born 1 January 1964) is an Italian lightweight rower. He won a gold medal at the 1988 World Rowing Championships in Milan with the lightweight men's eight.
