= Igor Pescialli =

Italian rower

Personal information
- Born: 28 July 1963 (age 62)

Sport
- Sport: Rowing
Medal record
Men's rowing
Representing Italy
World Rowing Championships
Gold medal – first place	1986 Nottingham	Double sculls

Igor Pescialli (born 28 July 1963) is an Italian rower. He won a gold medal at the 1986 World Rowing Championships in Nottingham with the men's double sculls.
