= Magdalena Georgieva =

Bulgarian rower (born 1962)

Personal information
- Born: Magdalena Stoyanova Georgieva; 7 December 1962 (age 63) Plovdiv, Bulgaria

Sport
- Sport: Rowing
Medal record
Women's rowing
Representing Bulgaria
Olympic Games
Bronze medal – third place	1988 Seoul	Single sculls
World Rowing Championships
Gold medal – first place	1987 Copenhagen	Single sculls
Silver medal – second place	1986 Nottingham	Single sculls
Bronze medal – third place	1985 Hazewinkel	Double sculls
Bronze medal – third place	1989 Bled	Double sculls
Bronze medal – third place	1989 Bled	Quad sculls
Summer Universiade
Silver medal – second place	1987 Zagreb	Single sculls

Magdalena Stoyanova Georgieva (Bulgarian: Магдалена Стоянова Георгиева) (born 7 December 1962) is a rower from Bulgaria.

She became single sculls world champion in the 1987 World Rowing Championships in Copenhagen, Denmark. A year later, she competed for Bulgaria in the 1988 Summer Olympics held in Seoul, South Korea in the single sculls event where she finished in third place.
