= Stephen Masters (rower) =

Danish rower (born 1969)

Personal information
- Born: 10 September 1969 (age 56)

Sport
- Sport: Rowing
Medal record
Men's rowing
Representing Denmark
World Rowing Championships Lwt eight
Silver medal – second place	1989 Bled	Lwt eight
Silver medal – second place	1990 Tasmania	Lwt eight
Silver medal – second place	1993 Račice	Lwt eight
Silver medal – second place	1994 Indianapolis	Lwt eight
Bronze medal – third place	1986 Nottingham	Lwt eight
Bronze medal – third place	1988 Milan	Lwt eight

Stephen Masters (born 10 September 1969) is a Danish lightweight rower. He won a bronze medal at the 1986 World Rowing Championships in Nottingham with the lightweight men's eight.
