= Rob Williams (rower, born 1960) =

British lightweight rower (born 1960)

Personal information
- Born: 9 December 1960 (age 65)

Sport
- Sport: Rowing
- Club: Mersey Rowing Club
Medal record
Men's rowing
Representing Great Britain
World Championships
Silver medal – second place	1988 Milan	LM4-
Bronze medal – third place	1989 Bled	LM4-

Rob Williams (born 9 December 1960) is a British lightweight rower. He now works as a rowing coach at Mersey Rowing Club and lives in Devonport, Tasmania, Australia.
