= Maria Sava =

Romanian rower

Personal information
- Born: 1 August 1959 (age 67) Hudeşti, Romania

Sport
- Sport: Rowing
Medal record
Representing Romania
World Rowing Championships
Gold medal – first place	1986 Nottingham	Lwt single sculls
Gold medal – first place	1987 Copenhagen	Lwt single sculls
Bronze medal – third place	1988 Milan	Lwt single sculls
Bronze medal – third place	1996 Motherwell	Lwt single sculls
Summer Universiade
Gold medal – first place	1987 Zagreb	Lwt single sculls

Maria Sava (born 1 August 1959) is a Romanian rower. In the 1986 and 1987 World Rowing Championships, she won gold medals in the women's lightweight single sculls event.
