= Ute Wild =

German rower (born 1965)

Medal record

Representing East Germany

Rowing at the Summer Olympics
| Gold medal – first place | 1988 Seoul | 8+ |

World Rowing Championships
| Silver medal – second place | Nottingham 1986 | 8+ |
| Silver medal – second place | Copenhagen 1987 | 8+ |
| Silver medal – second place | Bled 1989 | 8+ |
| Bronze medal – third place | Tasmania 1990 | 8+ |

Ute Wild (born 14 June 1965) is a German rower, who competed for the SG Dynamo Potsdam / Sportvereinigung (SV) Dynamo. She won the medals at the international rowing competitions.
