= Valentina Vîrlan =

Romanian rower

Valentina Vîrlan is a Romanian rower. In the 1987 World Rowing Championships, she won a gold medal in the women's coxed four event and women's eight event.

== See also ==
Valentina Vîrlan at World Rowing
