= Kristine Karlson =

American rower

Personal information
- Born: November 16, 1963 (age 62) Detroit, Michigan, United States

Sport
- Sport: Rowing
Medal record
Women's rowing
Representing United States
World Rowing Championships
Gold medal – first place	1988 Milan	Lwt single sculls
Gold medal – first place	1989 Bled	Lwt single sculls
Gold medal – first place	1989 Bled	Lwt double sculls
Bronze medal – third place	1989 Tasmania	Double sculls

Dr. Kristine Karlson (born November 16, 1963) is an American former rower. She competed in the women's quadruple sculls event at the 1992 Summer Olympics.

After graduating from the University of Connecticut School of Medicine, Karlson earned her doctorate. Although her medical studies had caused her to miss national races, she still competed in the 1989 World Rowing Championships and won gold. As a sports and family physician, she has worked at Dartmouth College, FISA events, and the USA national team.
