= Massimo Lana =

Italian rower

Personal information
- Born: 18 July 1962 (age 63)
- Height: 1.83 m (6 ft 0 in)
- Weight: 72 kg (159 lb)

Sport
- Sport: Rowing
Medal record
Men's rowing
Representing Italy
World Championships
Gold medal – first place	1985 Hazewinkel	Lwt men's eight
Gold medal – first place	1986 Nottingham	Lwt men's eight
Gold medal – first place	1987 Copenhagen	Lwt men's eight
Gold medal – first place	1988 Milan	Lwt men's four
Gold medal – first place	1990 Tasmania	Lwt men's quad scull
Gold medal – first place	1992 Montreal	Lwt men's quad scull
Silver medal – second place	1993 Račice	Lwt men's quad scull

Massimo Lana (born 18 July 1962) is an Italian lightweight rower. He won a gold medal at the 1988 World Rowing Championships in Milan with the lightweight men's four.
