= Björn Gehlsen =

German rower

Sport
- Sport: Rowing
Medal record
Men's rowing
Representing West Germany
World Rowing Championships
Gold medal – first place	1989 Bled	Lwt quad scull
Silver medal – second place	1987 Copenhagen	Lwt eight

Björn Gehlsen is a German lightweight rower. He won a gold medal at the 1989 World Rowing Championships in Bled with the lightweight men's quad scull.
