= Svend Blitskov =

Danish lightweight rower

Sport
- Sport: Rowing
Medal record
Men's rowing
Representing Denmark
World Rowing Championships
Gold medal – first place	1992 Montreal	Lwt eight
Silver medal – second place	1989 Bled	Lwt eight
Silver medal – second place	1990 Tasmania	Lwt eight
Silver medal – second place	1993 Račice	Lwt eight
Bronze medal – third place	1988 Milan	Lwt eight

Svend Blitskov is a Danish lightweight rower. He won a gold medal at the 1992 World Rowing Championships in Montreal with the lightweight men's eight.
