= Olaf Förster =

East German rower

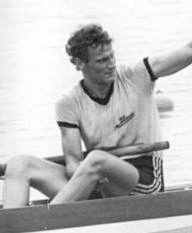
- Olaf Förster (1985)

Personal information
- Born: 2 November 1962 (age 63) Karl-Marx-Stadt, East Germany
- Height: 1.90 m (6 ft 3 in)
- Weight: 89 kg (196 lb)

Sport
- Sport: Rowing
- Club: SC Einheit Dresden
Medal record
Men's rowing
Representing East Germany
Olympic Games
Gold medal – first place	1988 Seoul	Coxless four
Friendship Games
Silver medal – second place	1984 Moscow	Coxless four
World Rowing Championships
Gold medal – first place	1987 Copenhagen	Coxless four
Gold medal – first place	1989 Bled	Coxless four
Bronze medal – third place	1985 Hazewinkel	Coxless four
Bronze medal – third place	1986 Nottingham	Coxed pair
Bronze medal – third place	1990 Tasmania	Coxless four

Olaf Förster (born 2 November 1962) is a retired German rower who had his best achievements in the coxless fours. In this event, he won a gold medal at the 1988 Summer Olympics and world titles in 1987 and 1989.

Förster's wife Kerstin also won a gold medal in rowing at the 1988 Olympics. The couple has two children.
