= Carlo Gaddi =

Italian rower

Medal record

Men's rowing

Representing Italy

World Rowing Championships
Gold medal – first place	1986 Nottingham	LM8+
Gold medal – first place	1987 Copenhagen	LM8+
Gold medal – first place	1989 Bled	LM8+
Gold medal – first place	1990 Tasmania	LM8+
Gold medal – first place	1991 Vienna	LM8+
Gold medal – first place	1994 Indianapolis	LM2-
Gold medal – first place	1995 Tampere	LM4-
Silver medal – second place	1985 Hazewinkel	LM2x
Silver medal – second place	1998 Cologne	LM2-
Silver medal – second place	2002 Seville	LM2-
Bronze medal – third place	1993 Račice	LM8+

Carlo Gaddi (born 5 February 1962 in Lecco) is an Italian rower.
