= Brigid Cassells =

Australian rower

Personal information
- Education: Australian National University

Sport
- Country: Australia
- Sport: Rowing
- Club: ANU Boat Club
Medal record
Women's rowing
Representing Australia
World Rowing Championships
Silver medal – second place	1984 Montreal	LW8+
Silver medal – second place	1988 Milan	LW4-

Brigid Cassells is an Australian former lightweight rower. She won silver medals at two World Rowing Championships.

== Club and state rowing ==
Raised in Canberra, Cassell's senior club rowing was from the Australian National University Boat Club.

Cassell first made New South Wales state representation in 1983 in the lightweight four which contested the Victoria Cup at the Interstate Regatta within the Australian Rowing Championships. She raced that event twice again in 1984 and 1990 when she stroked the New South Wales four.

In ANU colours she contested national championship events at the Australian Rowing Championships. She rowed at five in a composite Australian Capital Territory eight competing for the open women's eight title in 1982. In 1983, she was in the three seat of a composite eight comprising the New South Wales state selected lightweight plus heavyweight women's fours.

== International representative rowing ==
Cassells made her Australian representative debut in the lightweight eight at the inaugural world lightweight championships - the 1984 World Rowing Championships in Montreal. The women's eight was a demonstration rather than a championship event but the Australian girls with Cassells in the five seat rowed to a second place.

At the Milan 1988 Cassells rowed in the bow seat of the lightweight coxless four which took the silver medal.
