= Sebastian Franke =

German rower

Personal information
- Born: 12 April 1963 (age 63)

Sport
- Sport: Rowing
Medal record
Men's rowing
Representing West Germany
World Rowing Championships
Gold medal – first place	1987 Copenhagen	Lwt men's four
Bronze medal – third place	1988 Milan	Lwt men's four
Bronze medal – third place	1989 Bled	Lwt men's eight

Sebastian Franke (born 12 April 1963) is a German lightweight rower. He won a gold medal at the 1987 World Rowing Championships in Copenhagen with the lightweight men's four.
