= Mauro Torta =

Italian lightweight rower (born 1959)

Personal information
- Born: 17 September 1959 (age 66)

Sport
- Sport: Rowing
Medal record
Men's rowing
Representing Italy
World Championships
Gold medal – first place	1982 Lucerne	Lwt men's eight
Gold medal – first place	1986 Nottingham	Lwt men's four
Gold medal – first place	1988 Milan	Lwt men's four
Silver medal – second place	1981 Munich	Lwt men's eight
Silver medal – second place	1985 Hazewinkel	Lwt men's four
Silver medal – second place	1989 Bled	Lwt men's four
Bronze medal – third place	1979 Bled	Lwt men's double scull
Bronze medal – third place	1987 Copenhagen	Lwt men's four
Summer Universiade
Gold medal – first place	1987 Zagreb	Lwt men's four

Mauro Torta (born 17 September 1959) is an Italian lightweight rower. He won a gold medal at the 1986 World Rowing Championships in Nottingham with the lightweight men's four.
