= Nicholas Howe (rower) =

British rower

Medal record

Men's rowing

Representing Great Britain

World Championships
Gold medal – first place	1979 Bled	LM4-
Gold medal – first place	1980 Hazewinkel	LM8+
Silver medal – second place	1988 Milan	LM4-
Bronze medal – third place	1989 Bled	LM4-

Nicholas Howe is a British lightweight rower. He competed internationally between 1979 and 1990, and was twice world champion – with the lightweight men's four in 1979 and then the lightweight men's eight in 1980.
