= Laurien Vermulst =

Dutch rower (born 1960)

Medal record

Women's rowing

Representing the Netherlands

World Rowing Championships
Gold medal – first place	1988 Milan	LW2x
Silver medal – second place	1990 Tasmania	LW1x
Silver medal – second place	1991 Vienna	LW1x
Silver medal – second place	1993 Račice	LW1x
Silver medal – second place	1994 Indianapolis	LW1x
Bronze medal – third place	1989 Bled	LW1x

Laurien Vermulst (born 14 June 1960 in 's-Hertogenbosch) is a Dutch rower. She finished 4th in the women's quadruple sculls at the 1992 Summer Olympics.
