= 1988 World Rowing Championships =

International rowing event

- Venue: Idroscalo
- Location: Milan, Italy
- Dates: 6 August

The 1988 World Rowing Championships were World Rowing Championships that were held on 6 August 1988 at Milan in Italy. Since 1988 was an Olympic year for rowing, the World Championships did not include Olympic events scheduled for the 1988 Summer Olympics, but instead the lightweight events were held in conjunction with the World Junior Championships, which ran from 3 to 7 August.

== Medal summary ==
Medalists at the 1988 World Rowing Championships were:

=== Men's lightweight events ===
Event:	Gold:	Time	Silver:	Time	Bronze:	Time
LM1x	West Germany; Alwin Otten	7:05.60	Netherlands; Frans Göbel	7:09.86	Italy; Ruggero Verroca	7:10.57
LM2x	Italy; Enrico Gandola; Francesco Esposito	6:30.42	West Germany; Hartmut Schäfer; Roland Ehrenfels	6:32.83	Netherlands; Theo Nieuweboer; Jan van Bekkum	6:33.61
LM4-	Italy; Mauro Torta; Dario Longhin; Massimo Lana; Nerio Gainotti	6:09.48	Great Britain; Rob Williams; Nicholas Howe; Richard Metcalf; Michael Diserens	6:13.31	West Germany; Thomas Palm; Erik Ring; Gerd Meyer; Sebastian Franke	6:15.98
LM8+	Italy; Alfredo Striani; Andrea Re; Stefano Spremberg; Maurizio Losi; Fabrizio Ravasi; Enrico Barbaranelli; Sabino Bellomo; Vittorio Torcellan; Luigi Velotti (cox)	5:43.35	United States; Jeff Pfaendtner; Mike Tuchen; Luke Nelson; John Irvine; Tom White; Edward Hewitt; Tim Howell; Tim O'Brien; Michael O'Gorman (cox)	5:45.88	Denmark; Peter Lund; Bo Vestergaard; Niels Henriksen; Jesper Vedel; Flemming Meyer; Lars Rasmussen; Vagn Nielsen; Svend Blitskov; Stephen Masters (cox)	5:46.05

=== Women's lightweight events ===
Event:	Gold:	Time	Silver:	Time	Bronze:	Time
LW1x	United States; Kristine Karlson	7:45.25	West Germany; Angela Schuster	7:48.13	Romania; Maria Sava	7:48.62
LW2x	Netherlands; Laurien Vermulst; Ellen Meliesie	7:11.85	France; Christine Liegeois; Aline Peyrat	7:14.87	Great Britain; Gillian Bond; Caroline Lucas	7:15.94
LW4-	China; Zeng Meilan; Zhang Huajie; Lin Zhi-ai; Liang Sanmei	6:51.47	Australia; Brigid Cassells; Leeanne Whitehouse; Marina Cade; Justine Carroll	6:54.98	West Germany; Christiane Zimmer; Claudia Engels; Sonja Petri; Kathrin Schamck	6:56.67
