= Veronica Cochela =

Romanian rower

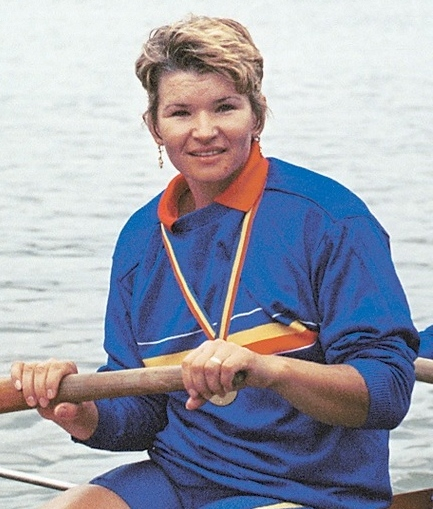

Personal information
- Full name: Veronica Cochela-Cogeanu
- Born: 15 November 1965 (age 60) Voinești, Iași, Romania
- Height: 175 cm (5 ft 9 in)
- Weight: 78 kg (172 lb)

Sport
- Sport: Rowing
- Club: CSA Steaua Bucuresti
Medal record
Representing Romania
Olympic Games
Gold medal – first place	1996 Atlanta	Eight
Gold medal – first place	2000 Sydney	Eight
Silver medal – second place	1988 Seoul	Double sculls
Silver medal – second place	1992 Barcelona	Quadruple sculls
Silver medal – second place	1992 Barcelona	Double sculls
Bronze medal – third place	1988 Seoul	Quadruple sculls
World Rowing Championships
Gold medal – first place	1990 Tasmania	Eights
Gold medal – first place	1993 Račice	Eights
Gold medal – first place	1997 France	Eights
Gold medal – first place	1998 Cologne	Eights
Silver medal – second place	1986 Nottingham	Coxed pair
Silver medal – second place	1989 Bled	Coxed pair
Silver medal – second place	1995 Tampere	Eights
Silver medal – second place	1997 France	Coxless pairs
Bronze medal – third place	1985 Hazewinkel	Quadruple sculls
Bronze medal – third place	1991 Vienna	Eights
Bronze medal – third place	1994 Indianapolis	Eights
Summer Universiade
Gold medal – first place	1987 Zagreb	Quadruple sculls
Gold medal – first place	1993 Buffalo	Single sculls
Silver medal – second place	1993 Buffalo	Quadruple sculls

Veronica Cochela-Cogeanu (born 15 November 1965) is a retired Romanian rower. She competed in different events at the 1988, 1992, 1996 and 2000 Olympics and won two gold, three silver and one bronze medals. Since the 1989 World Rowing Championships, she has competed under her married name. After retiring from competition she worked as a rowing coach, and since 2015 trains the national team.
