= Igor Kotko =

Soviet rower

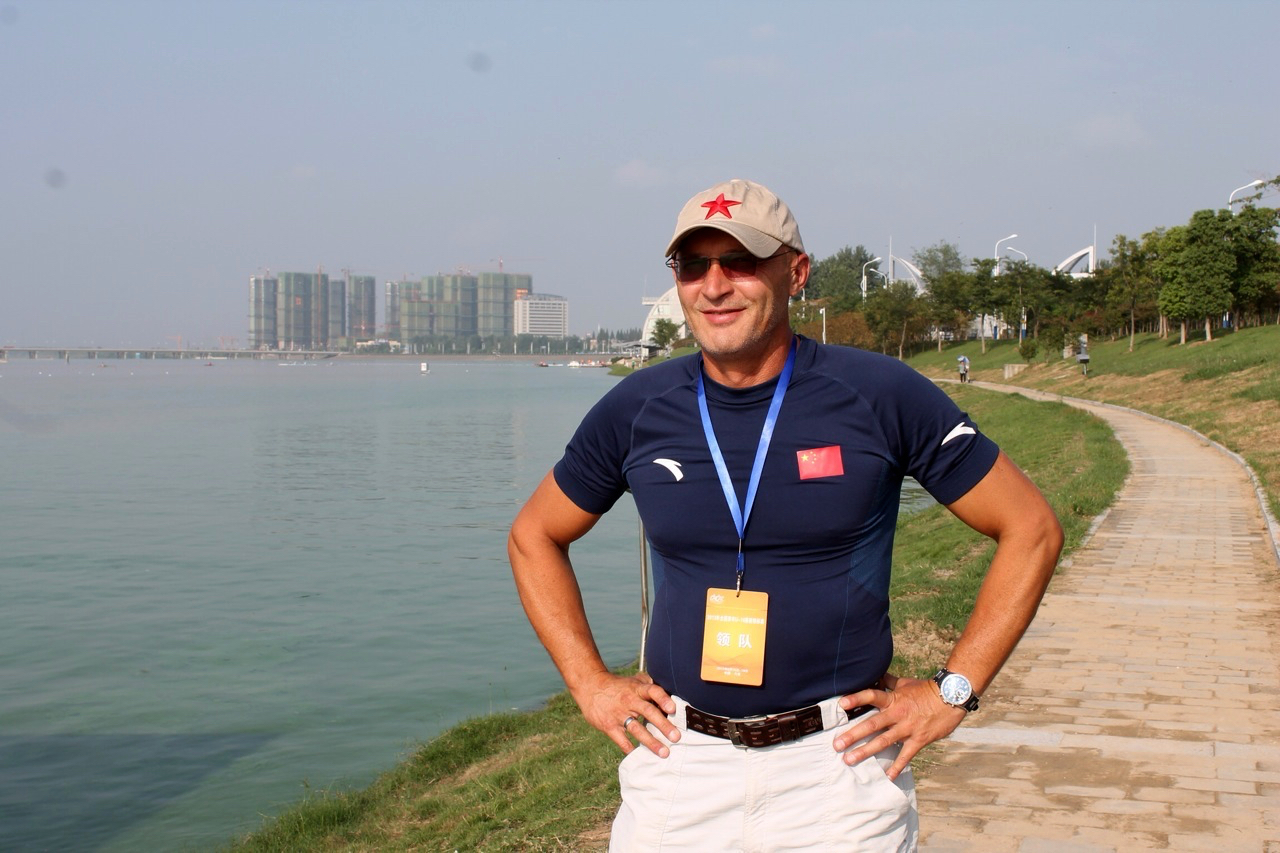
- Kotko in 2011

Personal information
- Born: 3 January 1963 (age 63)

Sport
- Sport: Rowing
Medal record
Men's rowing
Representing Soviet Union
World Rowing Championships
Gold medal – first place	1986 Nottingham	Quad scull

Igor Kotko (born 3 January 1963) is a Soviet rower. He won a gold medal at the 1986 World Rowing Championships in Nottingham with the men's quadruple sculls.
