= Rita Defauw =

Belgian rower

Personal information
- Nationality: Belgian
- Born: 23 May 1963 (age 63) Ghent, Belgium

Sport
- Sport: Rowing
Medal record
Women's Rowing
Representing Belgium
World Championships
Silver medal – second place	1989 Lake Bled	Lightweight single skull
Silver medal – second place	1986 Nottingham	Lightweight single skull

Rita Defauw (born 23 May 1963) is a Belgian rower. She competed in the women's single sculls event at the 1988 Summer Olympics.
