= Luigi Velotti =

Italian rowing cox

Sport
- Sport: Rowing
Medal record
Men's rowing
Representing Italy
World Rowing Championships
Gold medal – first place	1988 Milan	Lwt eight

Luigi Velotti is an Italian coxswain. He won a gold medal at the 1988 World Rowing Championships in Milan with the lightweight men's eight.
