= Mihaela Armășescu =

Romanian rower (born 1963)

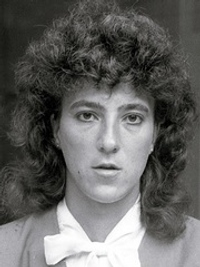
- Armășescu in the 1980s

Personal information
- Born: 3 September 1963 (age 63) Tomșani, Vâlcea, Romania
- Height: 180 cm (5 ft 11 in)
- Weight: 74 kg (163 lb)

Sport
- Sport: Rowing
- Club: Nautic ASE Bucharest
Medal record
Women's rowing
Representing Romania
Olympic Games
| Silver medal – second place | 1984 Los Angeles | Eight |
| Silver medal – second place | 1988 Seoul | Eight |
World Championships
| Gold medal – first place | 1989 Bled | Eight |
| Bronze medal – third place | 1982 Lucerne | Coxed four |
| Bronze medal – third place | 1985 Hazewinkel | Eight |
| Bronze medal – third place | 1986 Nottingham | Eight |
| Bronze medal – third place | 1989 Bled | Coxless four |
Summer Universiade
| Silver medal – second place | 1987 Zagreb | Coxless pair |

Mihaela Armășescu (born 3 September 1963) is a retired Romanian rower. She competed in various events at the 1984 and 1988 Olympics and four world championships between 1982 and 1989 and won seven medals, including two Olympic silver medals in the eights.
