= Vasile Tomoiagă =

Romanian rower

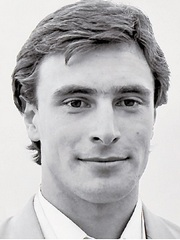

Personal information
- Born: 20 January 1964 (age 62) Vișeu de Sus, Romania
- Height: 197 cm (6 ft 6 in)
- Weight: 97 kg (214 lb)

Sport
- Sport: Rowing
Medal record
Representing Romania
Olympic Games
Silver medal – second place	1984 Los Angeles	Coxed pair
Silver medal – second place	1988 Seoul	Coxed pair
World Rowing Championships
Gold medal – first place	1989 Bled	Coxed four
Silver medal – second place	1985 Hazewinkel	Coxed pair
Bronze medal – third place	1987 Copenhagen	Coxed pair
Summer Universiade
Gold medal – first place	1987 Zagreb	Coxed fours
Gold medal – first place	1989 Duisburg	Coxed fours

Vasile Tomoiagă (born 20 January 1964) is a retired rower from Romania. He competed at the 1984, 1988 and 1992 Olympics and won silver medals in the coxed pairs in 1984 and 1988. He won a silver and a bronze medal in this event at the 1985 and 1987 world championships, as well as a gold medal in the coxed fours in 1989.
