= Erik Ring (rower) =

German rower

Sport
- Sport: Rowing
Medal record
Men's rowing
Representing West Germany
World Rowing Championships
Gold medal – first place	1987 Copenhagen	Lwt men's four
Bronze medal – third place	1988 Milan	Lwt men's four
Bronze medal – third place	1989 Bled	Lwt men's eight
Summer Universiade
Silver medal – second place	1987 Zagreb	Eight

Erik Ring is a German lightweight rower. He won a gold medal at the 1987 World Rowing Championships in Copenhagen with the lightweight men's four.
