= Dragoș Neagu =

Romanian rower

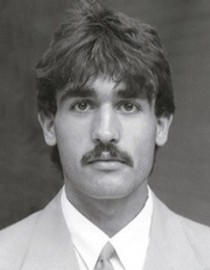

Personal information
- Born: 28 February 1967 (age 59) Bucharest, Romania
- Height: 198 cm (6 ft 6 in)
- Weight: 104 kg (229 lb)

Sport
- Sport: Rowing
Medal record
Representing Romania
Men's rowing
Olympic Games
Silver medal – second place	1988 Seoul	Coxless pair
World Rowing Championships
Silver medal – second place	1987 Copenhagen	Coxless pair
Silver medal – second place	1989 Bled	Coxed pair
Silver medal – second place	1991 Vienna	Coxed four
Bronze medal – third place	1994 Indianapolis	Eights
Summer Universiade
Gold medal – first place	1987 Zagreb	Coxless pair
Gold medal – first place	1989 Duisburg	Coxless pair

Dragoş Neagu (born 28 February 1967) is a retired Romanian rower. He competed in coxless pairs at the 1988 and 1992 Olympics and won a silver medal in 1988. At the world championships he won three silver and one bronze medals in different events between 1987 and 1994.
