= Franco Falossi =

Italian lightweight rower

Personal information
- Born: 1 February 1966 (age 60)

Sport
- Sport: Rowing
Medal record
Men's rowing
Representing Italy
World Rowing Championships
Gold medal – first place	1989 Bled	Lwt eight
Gold medal – first place	1990 Tasmania	Lwt eight

Franco Falossi (born 1 February 1966) is an Italian lightweight rower. He won a gold medal at the 1989 World Rowing Championships in Bled with the lightweight men's eight.
