= Kathrin Dienstbier =

German rower

Medal record

Representing East Germany

World Rowing Championships
| Silver medal – second place | Hazewinkel 1985 | 8+ |
| Silver medal – second place | Nottingham 1986 | 8+ |

Kathrin Dienstbier is a German rower, who competed for the SG Dynamo Potsdam / Sportvereinigung (SV) Dynamo. She won the medals at the international rowing competitions.
