= Alfredo Striani =

Italian rower

Personal information
- Born: 7 April 1967 (age 59)

Sport
- Sport: Rowing
Medal record
Men's rowing
Representing Italy
World Championships
Gold medal – first place	1987 Copenhagen	Lwt eight
Gold medal – first place	1988 Milan	Lwt eight
Gold medal – first place	1990 Tasmania	Lwt eight
Silver medal – second place	1989 Bled	Lwt four
Silver medal – second place	1991 Vienna	Lwt four
Silver medal – second place	1992 Montreal	Lwt four

Alfredo Striani (born 7 April 1967) is an Italian lightweight rower. He won a gold medal at the 1987 World Rowing Championships in Copenhagen with the lightweight men's eight.
