= Adriana Bazon =

Romanian rower (born 1963)

Adriana Chelariu
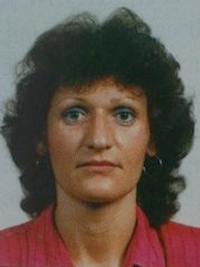

Personal information
- Full name: Adriana Bazon-Chelariu
- Born: Adriana Bazon; 5 July 1963 (age 63) Copălău, Romania
- Height: 181 cm (5 ft 11 in)
- Weight: 81 kg (179 lb)

Sport
- Sport: Rowing
- Club: Dinamo Bucharest
Medal record
Women's rowing
Representing Romania
Olympic Games
Silver medal – second place	1984 Los Angeles	Eight
Silver medal – second place	1988 Seoul	Eight
Silver medal – second place	1992 Barcelona	Eight
World Championships
Gold medal – first place	1987 Copenhagen	Eight
Gold medal – first place	1987 Copenhagen	Coxed four
Gold medal – first place	1989 Bled	Eight
Bronze medal – third place	1985 Hazewinkel	Eight
Bronze medal – third place	1986 Nottingham	Eight
Bronze medal – third place	1989 Bled	Coxless four
Bronze medal – third place	1991 Vienna	Eight
Summer Universiade
Silver medal – second place	1987 Zagreb	Coxless pair

Adriana Bazon-Chelariu (née Bazon, born 5 July 1963) is a retired Romanian rower. She competed at the 1984, 1988 and 1992 Olympics and five world championships between 1985 and 1991 and won 10 medals, including three world championship gold medals and three Olympic silver medals. At the 1987 World Rowing Championships, she still competed under her maiden name and at the 1988 Olympics, she started under her married name.
