= Enrico Barbaranelli =

Italian lightweight rower

Personal information
- Born: 24 May 1968 (age 58)
- Height: 183 cm (6 ft 0 in)
- Weight: 72 kg (159 lb)

Sport
- Sport: Rowing
Medal record
Men's rowing
Representing Italy
World Championships
Gold medal – first place	1988 Milan	Lwt eight
Gold medal – first place	1989 Bled	Lwt eight
Gold medal – first place	1990 Tasmania	Lwt eight
Gold medal – first place	1991 Vienna	Lwt eight
Bronze medal – third place	1993 Račice	Lwt eight
Bronze medal – third place	1994 Indianapolis	Lwt eight
Bronze medal – third place	1995 Tampere	Lwt eight

Enrico Barbaranelli (born 24 May 1968) is an Italian lightweight rower. He won a gold medal at the 1988 World Rowing Championships in Milan with the lightweight men's eight.
