= Mikhail Ivanov (rower) =

Soviet rower

Personal information
- Born: 24 September 1965 (age 60)

Sport
- Sport: Rowing
Medal record
Men's rowing
Representing Soviet Union
World Rowing Championships
Gold medal – first place	1986 Nottingham	Quad scull

Mikhail Ivanov (born 24 September 1965) is a Soviet rower. He won a gold medal at the 1986 World Rowing Championships in Nottingham with the men's quadruple sculls.
