= Karsten Schmeling =

German rower (born 1962)

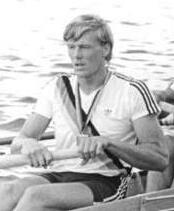
- Schmeling in 1988

Medal record

Men's rowing

Representing East Germany

Olympic Games
Gold medal – first place	1988 Seoul	Coxed four

Friendship Games
Bronze medal – third place	1984 Moscow	Coxed pair

World Rowing Championships
Gold medal – first place	1986 Nottingham	Coxed four
Gold medal – first place	1987 Copenhagen	Coxed four
Silver medal – second place	1981 Munich	Coxed pair
Silver medal – second place	1982 Luzern	Coxed pair
Silver medal – second place	1983 Duisburg	Eight

Karsten Schmeling (born 13 January 1962 in Hennigsdorf, Brandenburg) is a German rower, who competed for the SG Dynamo Potsdam / Sportvereinigung (SV) Dynamo. In October 1986, he was awarded a Patriotic Order of Merit in gold (first class) for his sporting success.
