= Dimitrie Popescu =

Romanian rower (1961–2023)

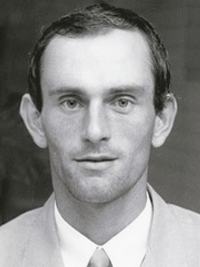
- Popescu in the 1980s

Personal information
- Born: 10 September 1961 Straja, Suceava, Romania
- Died: 11 November 2023 (aged 62) Bușteni, Prahova, Romania
- Height: 197 cm (6 ft 6 in)
- Weight: 93 kg (205 lb)

Sport
- Sport: Rowing
- Club: CSA Steaua Bucharest
Medal record
Representing Romania
Olympic Games
Gold medal – first place	1992 Barcelona	Coxed four
Silver medal – second place	1984 Los Angeles	Coxed pair
Silver medal – second place	1988 Seoul	Coxed four
Bronze medal – third place	1992 Barcelona	Coxed pair
World Rowing Championships
Gold medal – first place	1989 Bled	Coxed four
Silver medal – second place	1985 Hazewinkel	Coxed pair
Silver medal – second place	1996 Strathclyde	Coxed pair
Bronze medal – third place	1987 Copenhagen	Coxed pair
Summer Universiade
Gold medal – first place	1987 Zagreb	Coxed fours
Gold medal – first place	1989 Duisburg	Coxed fours

Dimitrie Popescu (10 September 1961 – 11 November 2023) was a Romanian rower. He competed in various events at the 1984, 1988, 1992 and 1996 Olympics and won one gold, two silver and one bronze medal. He won the same set of medals at the world championships in 1985–1996. After retiring from competition he worked as a coach for CSA Steaua. Popescu died in Bușteni on 11 November 2023, at the age of 62.
