= Ralf Brudel =

German rower (born 1963)

Medal record

Men's rowing

Olympic Games

Representing East Germany
Gold medal – first place	1988 Seoul	Coxless four

Representing Germany
Silver medal – second place	1992 Barcelona	Coxed four

World Rowing Championships

Representing East Germany
Gold medal – first place	1989 Bled	Coxless four
Silver medal – second place	1982 Lucerne	Eight
Bronze medal – third place	1990 Tasmania	Coxless four

Ralf Brudel (born 6 February 1963 in Potsdam) is a retired German rower who won a gold medal in 1988 Summer Olympics in Seoul. He was a member of the East Germany national team. In 1990 he tried to settle in Austria, but after the reunification of Germany he came back to Potsdam where he qualified for the 1992 Summer Olympics of Barcelona.
