= Kerstin Hinze =

German rower

Medal record

Representing East Germany

World Rowing Championships
Gold medal – first place	Nottingham 1986	4+

Kerstin Hinze is a German rower, who competed for the SG Dynamo Potsdam / Sportvereinigung (SV) Dynamo. She won the medals at the international rowing competitions, including a gold medal at the 1986 Rowing World Cup in Nottingham.
