= Daniele Boschin =

Italian lightweight rower

Sport
- Sport: Rowing
Medal record
Men's rowing
Representing Italy
World Rowing Championships
Gold medal – first place	1982 Lucerne	Lwt men's four

Daniele Boschin is an Italian lightweight rower. He won a gold medal at the 1982 World Rowing Championships in Lucerne with the lightweight men's four.
