= Marioara Trașcă =

Romanian rower

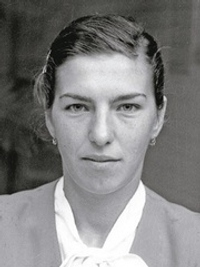

Personal information
- Born: 29 October 1962 (age 63) Bucharest, Romania
- Height: 172 cm (5 ft 8 in)
- Weight: 68 kg (150 lb)

Sport
- Sport: Rowing
Medal record
Women's rowing
Representing Romania
Olympic Games
Silver medal – second place	1984 Los Angeles	Eight
Silver medal – second place	1988 Seoul	Eight
Bronze medal – third place	1988 Seoul	Coxed four
World Rowing Championships
Gold medal – first place	1986 Nottingham	Coxed four
Gold medal – first place	1987 Copenhagen	Eight
Gold medal – first place	1987 Copenhagen	Coxed four
Bronze medal – third place	1985 Hazewinkel	Eight
Summer Universiade
Gold medal – first place	1989 Duisburg	Coxless fours

Marioara Trașcă (since the 1989 rowing season Curelea, born 29 October 1962) is a retired Romanian rower. Competing in coxed fours and eights she won three medals at the 1984 and 1988 Olympics and three world titles in 1986–1987.
