= Martina Walther =

East German rower

Medal record

Women's rowing

Representing East Germany

Olympic Games
Gold medal – first place	1988 Seoul	Coxed four

Martina Walther (born 5 October 1963 in Zeulenroda) is a German rower.
