= Livia Țicanu =

Romanian rower

Personal information
- Born: 4 August 1964 (age 62) Bucharest, Romania

Sport
- Sport: Rowing
Medal record
Representing Romania
Olympic Games
Silver medal – second place	1988 Seoul	Eights
World Championships
Gold medal – first place	1989 Bled	Eights
Bronze medal – third place	1989 Bled	Coxless fours
Summer Universiade
Gold medal – first place	1989 Duisburg	Coxless fours

Livia Țieanu (née Leonte; born 4 August 1964) is a retired Romanian rower. Competing in the women's eight, she won three medals between 1985 and 1987 at World Rowing Championships.
