= Hazewinkel =

Rowing venue in Belgium

Coordinates: 51.066°N 4.393°E

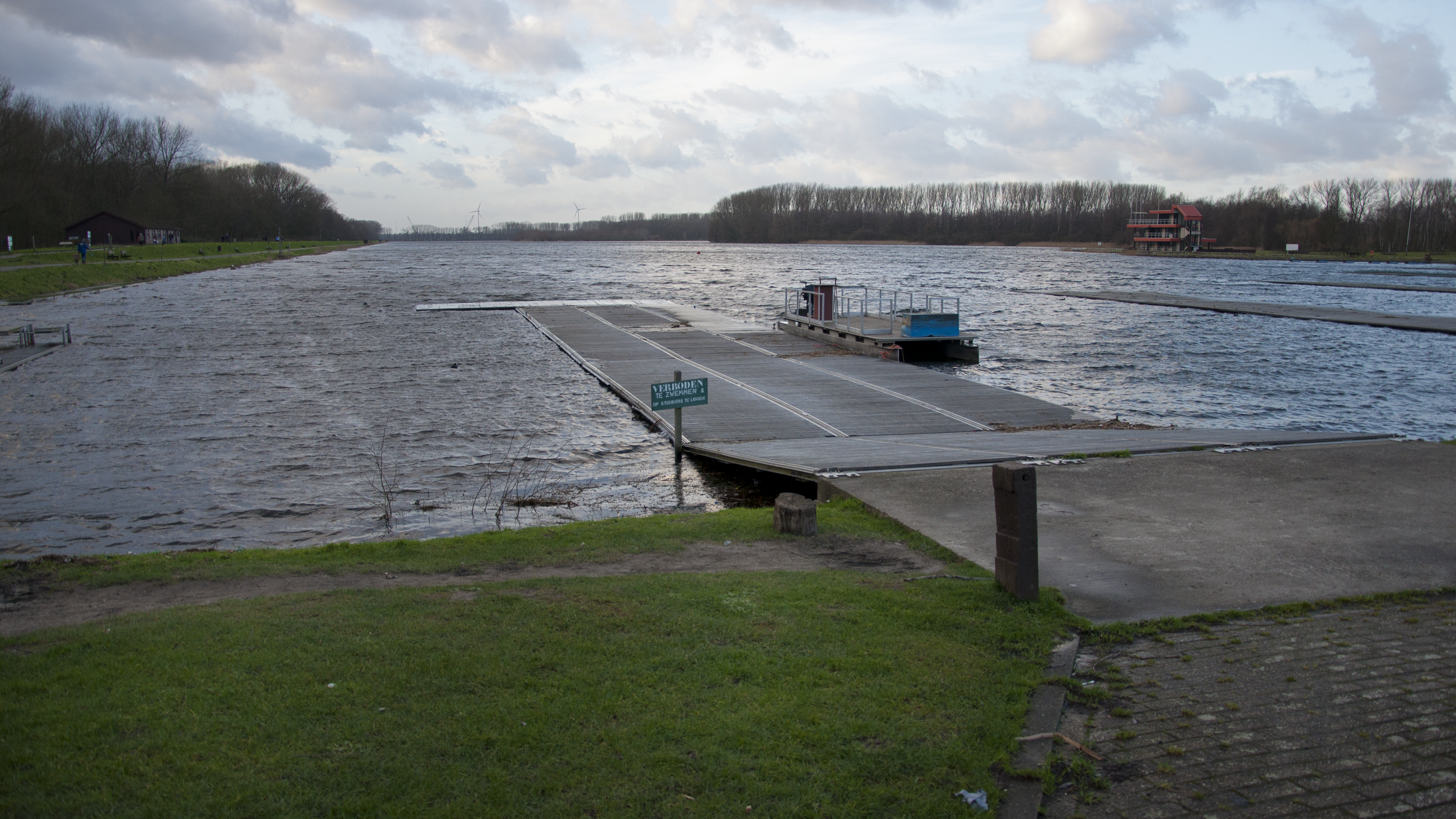
Hazewinkel lake

The Hazewinkel is a 2000-meter rowing and regatta course belonging to Sport Vlaanderen in Heindonk, municipality of Willebroek, near Mechelen, Belgium. The site consists of a finish tower, boathouses, a cafeteria, and eight basic huts that house athletes using the lake. The course hosted British Rowing's final trials for some years as well as a World Rowing Junior Championships (1997), two World Rowing Under 23 Championships (1996, 2006), and two World Rowing Championships (1980, 1985).

An accessible wetland nature reserve borders the south side. Boats under 5 metres length sail on a lake just to the north at 'De Bocht' with the VVW-Hazewinkel Club (founded 1978). This lake also serves members of the Hazewinkel Windsurfing Club, which welcomes visitors for a day.
