= Schwarz (surname) =

Schwarz is a common surname, derived from the German schwarz, pronounced [ˈʃvaʁts], meaning the color black. The Czech female form is Schwarzová. Notable people with the surname include:

- Aaron Schwarz, American architect
- Adolf Schwarz (1836–1910), Austrian-Hungarian chess master
- Alan Schwarz (born 1968), American writer
- Albert Schwarz (born 1934), Russian-born American mathematician and theoretical physicist
- Alf Schwarz (1935–2015), Canadian sociologist
- Alois Schwarz (1965–1999), Austrian cross-country skier
- André Schwarz-Bart (1928–2006), French novelist
- Andreas Schwarz (born 1965), German politician
- Antonín Schwarz (born 1940), Czechoslovak former sports shooter
- Armin Schwarz (born 1963), German rally driver
- Armin Schwarz (born 1968), German politician
- Arthur Schwarz (1890–1957), German art director
- Artur Martin Schwarz (1887–1963), Austrian orthodontist
- Arturo Schwarz (1924–2021), Italian scholar, art historian, poet, writer, lecturer, art consultant and curator
- Barbara Schwarz (born 1955), German national
- Benjamin Schwarz (disambiguation), multiple people
- Benoît Schwarz-van Berkel (born 1991), Swiss curler
- Bert Schwarz (1917–1999), Belgium-born Dutch politician
- Bertha Schwarz (1855–1947), German coloratura soprano opera singer
- Berthold Schwarz, Franciscan friar
- Berthold E. Schwarz (1924–2010), American psychiatrist and a researcher
- Bill Schwarz (born 1951), British academic and writer
- Bram Schwarz (born 1998), Dutch rower
- Brinsley Schwarz (born 1947), English guitarist
- Britta Schwarz (born 1964), German contralto
- Brooklyn Schwarz (born 2005), German-American footballer
- Carla Schwarz (born 2006), German footballer
- Charles Henry Schwarz (1825–1903), German-American businessman
- Charline Schwarz (born 2001), German archer
- Christian Schwarz (disambiguation), multiple people
- Christine Schwarz-Fuchs (born 1974), Austrian entrepreneur and politician
- Christoph Schwarz (c. 1545–1592), German court painter
- Christopher Schwarz (born 1968), American woodworker
- Daniel Schwarz (disambiguation), multiple people
- Daniela Schwarz (born 1985), Swiss footballer
- David Schwarz (disambiguation), multiple people
- Dean Schwarz, American ceramic artist, painter, historian, writer, publisher and teacher
- Dieter Schwarz (born 1939), German billionaire businessman
- Dietmar Schwarz (born 1947), German coxswain
- Donika Gërvalla-Schwarz (born 1971), Kosovar Albanian politician
- Dorothea Schwarz (born 2005), Austrian luger
- Eitan Schwarz, American adult, child and adolescent psychiatrist
- Eleonore Schwarz (born 1936), Austrian singer
- Ernő Schwarz (1902–1977), Hungarian American soccer player, coach and promoter
- Ernst Schwarz (disambiguation), multiple people
- Eugene Amandus Schwarz (1844–1928), German-American entomologist
- François Xavier de Schwarz (1762–1826), Badener and French general
- Frank H. Schwarz (1894–1951), American painter and muralist
- Franz Xaver Schwarz (1875–1947), Nazi treasurer
- Frederick Schwarz (disambiguation), various people
- Fritz Schwarz (1899–1961), German bobsledder
- Fritz Schwarz-Waldegg (1889–1943), Austrian painter
- Gerald Schwarz (born 1946), American mathematician
- Géraldine Schwarz (born 1974), German–French journalist, author and documentary filmmaker
- Gerard Schwarz (born 1947), American conductor
- Gerhard Schwarz (1902–1995), German church musician, organist and composer
- Gotthold Schwarz (born 1952), German bass-baritone and conductor
- Günther Schwarz (1941–2022), German politician
- Hanna Schwarz (born 1943), German mezzo-soprano and contralto singer
- Hanni Schwarz (1875–1935), German nude and portrait photographer
- Hanns Schwarz (1888–1945), Austrian film director
- Hans Schwarz (disambiguation), several people
- Harry Schwarz (1924–2010), South African lawyer, politician, diplomat and anti-apartheid leader
- Heiko Schwarz (born 1989), German footballer
- Heinrich Schwarz (1906–1947), German SS Nazi concentration camp commandant executed for war crimes
- Heinz Schwarz (1928–2023), German politician
- Helmut Schwarz (born 1943), German organic chemist
- Henning Schwarz (1928–1993), German politician
- Henrik Schwarz (born 1972), German deep house and classical crossover producer and DJ
- Herbert Schwarz (born 1953), German speed skater
- Herbert Ferlando Schwarz (1883–1960), American entomologist, son of Frederick
- Hermann Schwarz (disambiguation), multiple people
- Hubert Schwarz (born 1960), German Nordic combined skier
- Inbal Schwarz (born 1984), Israeli Paralympic swimmer
- Jack Schwarz (1896–1987), American independent producer
- Jacques Schwarz (1856–1921), Austrian chess player
- Jacques Schwarz-Bart (born 1962), French jazz saxophonist
- Jaecki Schwarz (born 1946), German actor
- Jakob Schwarz (born 1985), Austrian politician
- James Schwarz (born 1996), American baseball pitcher
- Jeanne Schwarz, French ballerina and dance teacher
- Jeff Schwarz (born 1964), American baseball pitcher
- Jeffrey Schwarz (born 1969), American Emmy Award-winning film producer, director and editor
- Jennifer Schwarz, American physicist
- Jessica Schwarz (born 1977), German film actress
- Joe Schwarz (1937–2026), American physician and independent politician
- John Schwarz (disambiguation), several people
- Johann Schwarz (disambiguation), multiple people
- José Carlos Schwarz (1949–1977), Bissau-Guinean poet and musician
- Josef Schwarz (born 1941), Czech-born German long jumper
- Joseph Schwarz (disambiguation), several people
- Judith Schwarz (born 1944), Canadian visual artist
- Julian Schwarz (born 1991), American cellist
- Julie Wilhelmine Hagen-Schwarz (1824–1902), German painter
- Justin Schwarz, American filmmaker, writer, director and producer
- Karen Schwarz (born 1984), Peruvian beauty pageant titleholder
- Karl Schwarz (1812–1885), German Protestant theologian
- Katharina A. Schwarz, German experimental psychologist and social psychologist
- Larry Schwarz (born 1970), American animation producer, entrepreneur, writer and photographer
- Laurent Schwarz (born 2021/2022), German child artist
- Lavoslav Schwarz (1837–1906), Croatian merchant from Zagreb
- Leo Schwarz (1931–2018), German Roman Catholic titular bishop
- Liesel Schwarz (born 1974), British steampunk author
- Lina Schwarz (1876–1947), Italian writer, educator, and pacifist
- Ludwig Schwarz (1940–2026), Austrian Catholic bishop
- Marco Schwarz (born 1995), Austrian World Cup alpine ski racer
- Marek Schwarz (born 1986), Czech ice hockey goaltender
- Maria Schwarz (1921–2018), German architect and professor
- Marie Beatrice Schol-Schwarz (1898–1969), Dutch phytopathologist who discovered the causal agent of Dutch elm disease
- Marquard Schwarz (1887–1968), American freestyle swimmer
- Matthäus Schwarz (1497–c. 1574), German accountant
- Matthias Schwarz (born 1987), German footballer
- Meier Schwarz (1926–2022), Israeli plant physiologist
- Michael Schwarz (disambiguation), several people
- Mommie Schwarz (1876–1942), Dutch painter
- Nathalie Schwarz (born 1993), Austrian cross-country skier
- Norbert Schwarz (born 1953), German psychologist
- Olaf Schwarz (born 1969), West German canoeist
- Otto Schwarz (1876–1961), German flautist, clarinettist, piccolo player, travelling musician and band leader
- Pablo Schwarz (born 1970), Chilean actor
- Paul Schwarz (1867–1939), German orientalist
- Peggy Schwarz (born 1971), German retired pair skater
- Peter Schwarz (born 1953), German footballer
- Peter Carl Ludwig Schwarz (1822–1894), German astronomer and explorer
- Petr Schwarz (born 1991), Czech footballer
- Petra Schwarz (born 1972), Austrian tennis player
- Ralph Schwarz (1967–1992), Dutch rower
- Reggie Schwarz (1875–1918), Anglo-South African cricketer and rugby player
- Reiner Schwarz (1948–2014), Canadian radio and television personality
- Rene Schwarz, Austrian Paralympic athlete
- Richard Schwarz (1890–1942), Russian track and field athlete
- Rikard Schwarz (1897–c. 1941), Croatian composer, conductor and music writer
- Robert Schwarz (disambiguation), several people
- Roland Schwarz
- Rudolf Schwarz (disambiguation), several people
- Samuel Schwarz
- Sandro Schwarz (born 1978), German football manager and former player
- Sebastian Schwarz
- Sherwood Schwarz (1930–2023), American businessman
- Sibylla Schwarz, 17th-century German poet
- Silas Schwarz (born 1997), German footballer
- Silke Schwarz, German wheelchair fencer
- Simon Schwarz (born 1971), Austrian actor
- Simone Schwarz-Bart (born 1938), French novelist and playwright
- Sissy Schwarz (born 1936), Austrian figure skater
- Solange Schwarz, French ballerina
- Stefan Schwarz (born 1969), Swedish footballer
- Stefan Schwarz (politician) (born 1959), German lobbyist and politician
- Stephan Schwarz (born 1965), German businessman, entrepreneur and independent politician
- Sven Schwarz
- Thomas Schwarz, American neuroscientist and molecular biology researcher
- Tom Schwarz (born 1994), German professional boxer
- Udo Schwarz (born 1986), German rugby player
- Vera Schwarz (1888–1964), Austrian soprano
- Viktoria Schwarz (born 1985), Austrian sprint canoer
- Vyacheslav Schwarz (1838–1869), Russian history and genre painter
- Walter Andreas Schwarz (1913–1992), German singer, songwriter, writer, Kabarettist, translator, author and narrator
- Werner Schwarz
- Willy Schwarz (1906–1982), German physician and anatomist
- Wolfgang Schwarz (born 1947), Austrian figure skater
