= Rowing at the 1984 Summer Olympics – Men's coxless four =

Men's coxless four at the Games of the XXIII Olympiad
- Venue: Lake Casitas
- Date: 31 July – 5 August 1984
- Competitors: 40 from 10 nations
- Teams: 10
- Winning time: 6:03.48

Medalists
| 1st place, gold medalist(s) | | Les O'Connell; Shane O'Brien; Conrad Robertson; Keith Trask | New Zealand |
| 2nd place, silver medalist(s) | | David Clark; Jonathan Smith; Phillip Stekl; Alan Forney | United States |
| 3rd place, bronze medalist(s) | | Michael Jessen; Lars Nielsen; Per Rasmussen; Erik Christiansen | Denmark |

The men's coxless four (M4-) competition at the 1984 Summer Olympics took place at Lake Casitas in Ventura County, California, United States. It was held from 31 July to 5 August and the outcome was wide open due to the Eastern Bloc boycott and thus the absence of the dominating team from the Soviet Union, and previously East Germany. The event was won by the team from New Zealand.

== Background ==
Beginning in 1966, East Germany was for many years the dominating nation in the men's coxless four event at European, World, and Olympic level. Their last gold came with the 1980 Summer Olympics. At the three subsequent World Championships, the Soviet Union had the best success (with one gold and two silvers), followed by Switzerland (one gold and one silver) and West Germany (one gold). With the Eastern Bloc nations absent due to their boycott, the field was wide open.

=== Previous M4- competitions ===
| Competition | Gold | Silver | Bronze |
|---|---|---|---|
| 1966 World Rowing Championships | East Germany | Soviet Union | Netherlands |
| 1967 European Rowing Championships | East Germany | Hungary | United States |
| 1968 Summer Olympics | East Germany | Hungary | Italy |
| 1969 European Rowing Championships | Soviet Union | Hungary | East Germany |
| 1970 World Rowing Championships | East Germany | West Germany | Denmark |
| 1971 European Rowing Championships | East Germany | Norway | West Germany |
| 1972 Summer Olympics | East Germany | New Zealand | West Germany |
| 1973 European Rowing Championships | East Germany | Norway | West Germany |
| 1974 World Rowing Championships | East Germany | Soviet Union | West Germany |
| 1975 World Rowing Championships | East Germany | Soviet Union | Romania |
| 1976 Summer Olympics | East Germany | Norway | Soviet Union |
| 1977 World Rowing Championships | East Germany | New Zealand | Czechoslovakia |
| 1978 World Rowing Championships | Soviet Union | East Germany | Great Britain |
| 1979 World Rowing Championships | East Germany | Czechoslovakia | Great Britain |
| 1980 Summer Olympics | East Germany | Soviet Union | Great Britain |
| 1981 World Rowing Championships | Soviet Union | Switzerland | East Germany |
| 1982 World Rowing Championships | Switzerland | Soviet Union | Romania |
| 1983 World Rowing Championships | West Germany | Soviet Union | Sweden |

== Results ==
=== Heats ===
The first two races were held on 31 July. Five teams competed per heat, and the winner would progress to the A final. The remaining teams would progress to the repechage.

==== Heat 1 ====
| Rank | Rower | Country | Time | Notes |
|---|---|---|---|---|
| 1 | Les O'Connell; Shane O'Brien; Conrad Robertson; Keith Trask | New Zealand | 6:08.41 | FA |
| 2 | Norbert Keßlau; Volker Grabow; Jörg Puttlitz; Guido Grabow | West Germany | 6:09.54 | R |
| 3 | Michael Jessen; Lars Nielsen; Per Rasmussen; Erik Christiansen | Denmark | 6:15.58 | R |
| 4 | Tim Turner; Ted Gibson; David Johnson; Stephen Beatty | Canada | 6:24.79 | R |
| 5 | Gu Jiahong; Tang Hongwei; Liu Baogang; Wang Hongbing | China | 6:45.25 | R |

==== Heat 2 ====
| Rank | Rower | Country | Time | Notes |
|---|---|---|---|---|
| 1 | David Clark; Jonathan Smith; Phillip Stekl; Alan Forney | United States | 6:11.58 | FA |
| 2 | Anders Wilgotson; Hans Svensson; Lars-Åke Lindqvist; Anders Larson | Sweden | 6:13.40 | R |
| 3 | Bruno Saile; Jürg Weitnauer; Hans-Konrad Trümpler; Stefan Netzle | Switzerland | 6:19.23 | R |
| 4 | David Doyle; James Lowe; Duncan Fisher; John Bentley | Australia | 6:22.14 | R |
| 5 | Jonathan Clift; John Garrett; Martin Knight; John Bland | Great Britain | 6:23.95 | R |

=== Repechage ===
Two repechages were held on 2 August with four teams each. The first two teams would progress to the A final, whilst the remaining two teams would go to the B final.

==== Heat 1 ====
The Chinese team changed all four seats for the repechage. This was the only seat change during the coxless four competition.

| Rank | Rower | Country | Time | Notes |
|---|---|---|---|---|
| 1 | Bruno Saile; Jürg Weitnauer; Hans-Konrad Trümpler; Stefan Netzle | Switzerland | 6:20.44 | FA |
| 2 | Norbert Keßlau; Volker Grabow; Jörg Puttlitz; Guido Grabow | West Germany | 6:22.54 | FA |
| 3 | David Doyle; James Lowe; Duncan Fisher; John Bentley | Australia | 6:29.04 | FB |
| 4 | Wang Hongbing; Liu Baogang; Gu Jiahong; Tang Hongwei | China | 6:46.18 | FB |

==== Heat 2 ====
| Rank | Rower | Country | Time | Notes |
|---|---|---|---|---|
| 1 | Anders Wilgotson; Hans Svensson; Lars-Åke Lindqvist; Anders Larson | Sweden | 6:21.22 | FA |
| 2 | Michael Jessen; Lars Nielsen; Per Rasmussen; Erik Christiansen | Denmark | 6:22.94 | FA |
| 3 | Tim Turner; Ted Gibson; David Johnson; Stephen Beatty | Canada | 6:28.11 | FB |
| 4 | Jonathan Clift; John Garrett; Martin Knight; John Bland | Great Britain | 6:32.84 | FB |

=== Finals ===
Four teams competed in the B final for places 7 to 10, and six teams competed in the A final.

==== B final ====
The B final was held on 3 August.

| Rank | Rower | Country | Time |
|---|---|---|---|
| 7 | Tim Turner; Ted Gibson; David Johnson; Stephen Beatty | Canada | 6:26.10 |
| 8 | David Doyle; James Lowe; Duncan Fisher; John Bentley | Australia | 6:28.31 |
| 9 | Jonathan Clift; John Garrett; Martin Knight; John Bland | Great Britain | 6:32.13 |
| 10 | Wang Hongbing; Liu Baogang; Gu Jiahong; Tang Hongwei | China | 6:50.03 |

==== A final ====
The A final was held on 5 August.

| Rank | Rower | Country | Time |
|---|---|---|---|
| 1st place, gold medalist(s) | Les O'Connell; Shane O'Brien; Conrad Robertson; Keith Trask | New Zealand | 6:03.48 |
| 2nd place, silver medalist(s) | David Clark; Jonathan Smith; Phillip Stekl; Alan Forney | United States | 6:06.10 |
| 3rd place, bronze medalist(s) | Michael Jessen; Lars Nielsen; Per Rasmussen; Erik Christiansen | Denmark | 6:07.72 |
| 4 | Norbert Keßlau; Volker Grabow; Jörg Puttlitz; Guido Grabow | West Germany | 6:09.27 |
| 5 | Bruno Saile; Jürg Weitnauer; Hans-Konrad Trümpler; Stefan Netzle | Switzerland | 6:09.50 |
| 6 | Anders Wilgotson; Hans Svensson; Lars-Åke Lindqvist; Anders Larson | Sweden | 6:11.71 |
