= Rowing at the 1988 Summer Olympics – Men's coxless four =

Men's coxless four at the Games of the XXIV Olympiad
- Date: 20–25 September 1988
- Competitors: 61 from 15 nations

Medalists
1st place, gold medalist(s)		Roland Schröder; Ralf Brudel; Olaf Förster; Thomas Greiner	East Germany
2nd place, silver medalist(s)		Raoul Rodriguez; Thomas Bohrer; Richard Kennelly; David Krmpotich	United States
3rd place, bronze medalist(s)		Guido Grabow; Volker Grabow; Norbert Keßlau; Jörg Puttlitz	West Germany

The men's coxless four competition at the 1988 Summer Olympics took place at took place at Han River Regatta Course, South Korea.

== Competition format ==
The competition consisted of three main rounds (heats, semifinals, and finals) as well as a repechage. The 15 boats were divided into three heats for the first round, with 5 boats in each heat. The top three boats in each heat (9 boats total) advanced directly to the semifinals. The remaining 6 boats were placed in the repechage. The repechage featured a single heat, with the top three boats advancing to the semifinals and the remaining 3 boats (4th, 5th, and 6th placers in the repechage) being eliminated (13th, 14th, and 15th place overall). The 12 semifinalist boats were divided into two heats of 6 boats each. The top three boats in each semifinal (6 boats total) advanced to the "A" final to compete for medals and 4th through 6th place; the bottom three boats in each semifinal were sent to the "B" final for 7th through 12th.

All races were over a 2000 metre course.

== Results ==
=== Heats ===
==== Heat 1 ====
Rank	Rowers	Nation	Time	Notes
1	Ralf Brudel; Olaf Förster; Thomas Greiner; Roland Schröder	East Germany	6:05.65	Q
2	Sergio Caropreso; Carlo Gaddi; Pasquale Marigliano; Valter Molea	Italy	6:07.97	Q
3	Nikolay Pimenov; Yuriy Pimenov; Sergey Smirnov; Ivan Vysotskiy	Soviet Union	6:11.15	Q
4	Folke Brundin; Per-Olof Claesson; Anders Larson; David Svensson	Sweden	6:19.12	R
5	Georgios Fotou; Spyridon Gatos; Khristos Khristomanos; Vasilios Lykomitros	Greece	6:39.28	R

==== Heat 2 ====
Rank	Rowers	Nation	Time	Notes
1	Thomas Bohrer; Richard Kennelly; David Krmpotich; Raoul Rodriguez	United States	6:03.67	Q
2	Campbell Clayton-Greene; Geoff Cotter; Bill Coventry; Neil Gibson	New Zealand	6:06.75	Q
3	Guido Grabow; Volker Grabow; Norbert Keßlau; Jörg Puttlitz	West Germany	6:13.16	Q
4	Darby Berkhout; Raymond Collier; John Ossowski; Bruce Robertson	Canada	6:22.42	R
5	José Luis Aguirre; Bartolomé Alarcón; Enrique Briones; José María Segurola	Spain	6:28.34	R

==== Heat 3 ====
Rank	Rowers	Nation	Time	Notes
1	Simon Berrisford; Mark Buckingham; Peter Mulkerrins; Stephen Peel	Great Britain	6:06.52	Q
2	Pascal Bahuaud; Dominique Lecointe; Jean-Jacques Martigne; Olivier Pons	France	6:08.76	Q
3	Tjark de Vries; Johan Leutscher; Ralph Schwarz; Sven Schwarz	Netherlands	6:17.24	Q
4	Marcos Arantes; Fernando Fantoni; Oswaldo Kuster Neto; Waldemar Trombetta	Brazil	6:29.61	R
5	Hong Jae-ho; Lee Hyung-ki; Yun Nam-ho; Yun Yong-ho	South Korea	6:46.62	R

=== Repechage ===
Rank	Rowers	Nation	Time	Notes
1	Folke Brundin; Per-Olof Claesson; Anders Larson; David Svensson	Sweden	6:14.52	Q
2	Darby Berkhout; Raymond Collier; John Ossowski; Bruce Robertson	Canada	6:16.88	Q
3	Georgios Fotou; Spyridon Gatos; Khristos Khristomanos; Vasilios Lykomitros	Greece	6:17.49	Q
4	José Luis Aguirre; Bartolomé Alarcón; Enrique Briones; José María Segurola	Spain	6:18.25	
5	Marcos Arantes; Fernando Fantoni; Oswaldo Kuster Neto; Waldemar Trombetta	Brazil	6:30.85	
6	Hong Jae-ho; Lee Hyung-ki; Yun Nam-ho; Yun Yong-ho	South Korea	6:50.47	

=== Semifinals ===
==== Semifinal 1 ====
Rank	Rowers	Nation	Time	Notes
1	Ralf Brudel; Olaf Förster; Thomas Greiner; Roland Schröder	East Germany	6:00.29	QA
2	Nikolay Pimenov; Yuriy Pimenov; Sergey Smirnov; Ivan Vysotskiy	Soviet Union	6:03.25	QA
3	Simon Berrisford; Mark Buckingham; Peter Mulkerrins; Stephen Peel	Great Britain	6:03.85	QA
4	Campbell Clayton-Greene; Geoff Cotter; Bill Coventry; Neil Gibson	New Zealand	6:06.60	QB
5	Tjark de Vries; Johan Leutscher; Ralph Schwarz; Sven Schwarz	Netherlands	6:14.96	QB
6	Darby Berkhout; Raymond Collier; John Ossowski; Bruce Robertson	Canada	6:22.35	QB

==== Semifinal 2 ====
Rank	Rowers	Nation	Time	Notes
1	Guido Grabow; Volker Grabow; Norbert Keßlau; Jörg Puttlitz	West Germany	6:04.17	QA
2	Sergio Caropreso; Carlo Gaddi; Pasquale Marigliano; Valter Molea	Italy	6:06.75	QA
3	Thomas Bohrer; Richard Kennelly; David Krmpotich; Raoul Rodriguez	United States	6:07.71	QA
4	Pascal Bahuaud; Dominique Lecointe; Jean-Jacques Martigne; Olivier Pons	France	6:10.36	QB
5	Folke Brundin; Per-Olof Claesson; Anders Larson; David Svensson	Sweden	6:16.28	QB
6	Georgios Fotou; Spyridon Gatos; Khristos Khristomanos; Vasilios Lykomitros	Greece	6:37.24	QB

=== Finals ===
==== Final B ====
Rank	Rowers	Nation	Time
7	Campbell Clayton-Greene; Geoff Cotter; Bill Coventry; Neil Gibson	New Zealand	6:04.74
8	Pascal Bahuaud; Dominique Lecointe; Jean-Jacques Martigne; Olivier Pons	France	6:08.60
9	Tjark de Vries; Johan Leutscher; Ralph Schwarz; Sven Schwarz	Netherlands	6:15.32
10	Folke Brundin; Per-Olof Claesson; Anders Larson; David Svensson	Sweden	6:16.41
11	Darby Berkhout; Henry Gordon; John Ossowski; Bruce Robertson	Canada	6:16.74
12	Georgios Fotou; Spyridon Gatos; Khristos Khristomanos; Vasilios Lykomitros	Greece	6:18.25

==== Final A ====
Rank	Rowers	Nation	Time
1st place, gold medalist(s)	Ralf Brudel; Olaf Förster; Thomas Greiner; Roland Schröder	East Germany	6:03.11
2nd place, silver medalist(s)	Thomas Bohrer; Richard Kennelly; David Krmpotich; Raoul Rodriguez	United States	6:05.53
3rd place, bronze medalist(s)	Guido Grabow; Volker Grabow; Norbert Keßlau; Jörg Puttlitz	West Germany	6:06.22
4	Simon Berrisford; Mark Buckingham; Peter Mulkerrins; Stephen Peel	Great Britain	6:06.74
5	Sergio Caropreso; Carlo Gaddi; Pasquale Marigliano; Valter Molea	Italy	6:09.55
6	Nikolay Pimenov; Yuriy Pimenov; Sergey Smirnov; Ivan Vysotskiy	Soviet Union	11:03.77

== Final classification ==
Rank	Rowers	Country
1st place, gold medalist(s)	Roland Schröder; Ralf Brudel; Olaf Förster; Thomas Greiner	East Germany
2nd place, silver medalist(s)	Raoul Rodriguez; Thomas Bohrer; Richard Kennelly; David Krmpotich	United States
3rd place, bronze medalist(s)	Guido Grabow; Volker Grabow; Norbert Keßlau; Jörg Puttlitz	West Germany
4	Mark Buckingham; Stephen Peel; Simon Berrisford; Peter Mulkerrins	Great Britain
5	Sergio Caropreso; Carlo Gaddi; Pasquale Marigliano; Valter Molea	Italy
6	Ivan Vysotskiy; Sergey Smirnov; Yuriy Pimenov; Nikolay Pimenov	Soviet Union
7	Campbell Clayton-Greene; Geoff Cotter; Bill Coventry; Neil Gibson	New Zealand
8	Pascal Bahuaud; Dominique Lecointe; Jean-Jacques Martigne; Olivier Pons	France
9	Tjark de Vries; Johan Leutscher; Ralph Schwarz; Sven Schwarz	Netherlands
10	Folke Brundin; Per-Olof Claesson; Anders Larson; David Svensson	Sweden
11	Darby Berkhout; Gord Henry; John Ossowski; Bruce Robertson; Raymond Collier	Canada
12	Khristos Khristomanos; Georgios Fotou; Spyridon Gatos; Vasilios Lykomitros	Greece
13	José Luis Aguirre; Bartolomé Alarcón; Enrique Briones; José María Segurola	Spain
14	Marcos Arantes; Fernando Fantoni; Oswaldo Kuster Neto; Waldemar Trombetta	Brazil
15	Hong Jae-ho; Lee Hyung-ki; Yun Nam-ho; Yun Yong-ho	South Korea
