= Sandy Kendall =

American rower

Sport
- Sport: Rowing
Medal record
Representing United States
World Championships
Gold medal – first place	1986 Nottingham	LW4-
Gold medal – first place	1987 Copenhagen	LW4-
Silver medal – second place	1985 Hazewinkel	LW4-
Bronze medal – third place	1984 Montreal	LW4-
Summer Universiade
Bronze medal – third place	1989 Duisburg	Coxless pairs

Sandy Kendall is an American rower. In the 1986 and 1987 World Rowing Championships, she won gold in the women's lightweight coxless four event (see rosters below). The crews were coached by Andy Anderson, who coached the U.S. lightweight coxless four from 1985 through 1988 (and again in the mid 1990s). Kendall was coached by Gordon Hamilton in the 1984 World Championships (LW4- with C.B. Sands, Kristen Fowks, and Grace Hodges), as well as in the 1989 World University Games (LW2- bronze with Carin Reynolds) and the 1990 Goodwill Games (LW2- with Charlotte Hollings). She was inducted into the National Rowing Hall of Fame in 1997.
