= 1994 Honduran Cup =

Tournament details
- Country: Honduras
- Teams: 10

Final positions
- Champions: Marathón (1st title)
- Runner-up: Real Maya

The 1994 Honduran Cup was the fifth edition, C.D. Marathón won its first and only title after beating Real Maya 3-2 in the final match.

== First round ==
=== Group A ===
==== Standings ====
Pos	Team	Pld	W	D	L	GF	GA	GD	Pts	Qualification
1	Olimpia	0	0	0	0	0	0	0	0	Qualification to the Final round
2	Real Maya	0	0	0	0	0	0	0	0	Qualification to the Final round
3	Real España	0	0	0	0	0	0	0	0	
4	Platense	0	0	0	0	0	0	0	0	
5	Victoria	0	0	0	0	0	0	0	0	

=== Group B ===
==== Standings ====
Pos	Team	Pld	W	D	L	GF	GA	GD	Pts	Qualification
1	Motagua	0	0	0	0	0	0	0	0	Qualification to the Final round
2	Marathón	0	0	0	0	0	0	0	0	Qualification to the Final round
3	Vida	0	0	0	0	0	0	0	0	
4	Broncos	0	0	0	0	0	0	0	0	
5	Deportes Progreseño	0	0	0	0	0	0	0	0	

== Final round ==
=== Semifinals ===
2 October 1994	Motagua	1–2	Real Maya	Tegucigalpa, Francisco Morazán
	Romero		Figueroa; Fúnez	Stadium: Estadio Tiburcio Carías Andino

9 October 1994	Olimpia	1–2	Marathón	Tegucigalpa, Francisco Morazán
	Laje		Santana; Aguirre	Stadium: Estadio Tiburcio Carías Andino

=== Final ===
16 October 1994	Marathón	3–2 (a.e.t.)	Real Maya	San Pedro Sula, Cortés
	Santana 92'		Zúniga	Stadium: Estadio Francisco Morazán
