= Stephen Spurling =

Australian rower

Sport
- Country: Australia
- Sport: Rowing
- Club: Reeconian Rowing Club; Buckingham Rowing Club; Melbourne Uni Boat Club

Achievements and titles
- National finals: King's Cup 1973,74,77; Penrith Cup 1982-1984
Medal record
Men's rowing
Representing Australia
World Rowing Championships
Silver medal – second place	1983 Duisburg	LM8+

Stephen Spurling is an Australian former lightweight rower. He was an Australian national representative at four World Rowing Championships. He won a silver medal at the 1983 World Rowing Championships.

== Rowing family ==
Spurling's mother Marjorie (1914-1995) was a seminal figure in rowing on the north-west coast of Tasmania. She was a foundation member of the Reece High School Rowing Parents and Friends Group in 1964 and helped found the now-defunct Reeconian Rowing Club in 1965. She was a club delegate to the Northern Tasmanian Rowing Association and the association’s delegate to the Tasmanian Rowing Council. She played a key role in the development of women's rowing in Tasmania, and was the first woman to manage a state rowing team when she was given that role in 1980. She was one of the driving forces behind establishing Lake Barrington as the sport’s key regatta venue in Tasmania. She was awarded an OAM for her contribution tot the community and to rowing.

Stephen's brother David Spurling was also involved with the sport as a competitor and coach.

== Club and state rowing ==
Stephen Spurling's senior rowing was initially from the Reeconian Rowing Club and the Buckingham Rowing Club in Tasmania and later with the Melbourne University Boat Club.

In 1973 he first made Tasmanian state selection in the bow seat of the Tasmanian men's eight contesting the King's Cup at the Interstate Regatta within the Australian Rowing Championships. In 1974 he stroked the Tasmanian King's Cup eight to a fourth place finish and he again stroked the Tasmanian eight in 1977. In 1976, 1978 and 1979 he raced as a sculler for Tasmania contesting the President's Cup. In those days before "first & final" races, up to three entrants raced for each state and at those regattas Spurling was eliminated in either the semi-final or repechage.

By 1982 Spurling had relocated to Melbourne and was rowing from the MUBC. He made three successive appearance from 1982 to 1984 in the Victorian lightweight coxless four contesting the Penrith Cup at the Interstate Regatta. He stroked the 1984 crew to victory and saw second placings in 1982 and 1983.

== International representative rowing ==
Spurling made his Australian representative debut as a lightweight sculler at the 1979 World Rowing Championships in Bled. He was eliminated in the repechage. At the 1981 World Rowing Championships in Munich he was again a lightweight sculling entrant. He finished in eleventh place. In 1982 he gained a seat in the Australian lightweight eight. He rowed at four in their fourth place finish at the 1982 World Rowing Championships in Lucerne.

In 1983 he stroked the Australian lightweight eight which contested and won the silver medal the 1983 World Rowing Championships in Duisburg. The following year he stroked the Australian lightweight eight which placed tenth at the 1984 World Rowing Championships in Montreal. It was his last Australian representative appearance.

== Coaching career ==
Post-competitive rowing Spuring moved straight into coaching. He coached the Victorian youth eights of 1985 and 1990 both to victory at the Interstate Regatta and he coached the winning Victorian King's Cup eight of 1994. He took Australian pairs and fours to World Rowing Championships in 1993, 1994 and 1995.
