= Alan Forney =

American rower (born 1960)

Personal information
- Full name: Alan Michael Forney
- Born: June 28, 1960 (age 66) Beaufort, South Carolina, U.S.
Medal record
Men's rowing
Representing the United States
Olympic Games
Silver medal – second place	1984 Los Angeles	Coxless four

Alan Michael Forney (born June 28, 1960) is an American former competitive rower and Olympic silver medalist.

== Career ==
At the 1984 Summer Olympics, Forney finished in 2nd place in the men's coxless four competition with David Clark, Jonathan Smith, and Phillip Stekl.
