= Michael Jessen =

Danish rower (born 1960)

Medal record

Men's rowing

Representing Denmark

Olympic Games
Bronze medal – third place	1984 Los Angeles	Coxless four

Michael Jessen (born 4 April 1960 in Frederiksberg) is a Danish rower. Hen represented the rowing club Roforeningen KVIK.

He won bronze medals at the 1984 Olympics in Los Angeles together with Lars Nielsen, Per Rasmussen og Erik Christiansen, losing to New Zealand and USA.

He also participated in the 1980 Olympics in Moscow.
