= Philip Stekl =

American rower

Personal information
- Born: January 20, 1956 (age 70) Middletown, Connecticut, U.S.
Medal record
Men's rowing
Representing the United States
Olympic Games
Silver medal – second place	1984 Los Angeles	Coxless four

Philip William "Otto" Stekl (born January 20, 1956) is an American former competitive rower and Olympic silver medalist. Stekl graduated from the University of Pennsylvania in 1978 with a Bachelor of Arts degree.

== Olympian ==
Stekl qualified for the 1980 U.S. Olympic team but was unable to compete due to the 1980 Summer Olympics boycott. In 2007, he received one of 461 Congressional Gold Medals created especially for the spurned athletes. At the 1984 Summer Olympics, Stekl finished in 2nd place in the men's coxless four competition with David Clark, Jonathan Smith, and Alan Forney.
