= Marostica (disambiguation) =

Marostica or Maròstega is a town and comune in the province of Vicenza, Veneto, northern Italy.

Marostica may also refer to:

- Chanty Marostica, Canadian stand-up comedian
- Don Marostica (born 1948), American real estate developer and legislator
- Paolo Marostica, Italian lightweight rower
