= Per Rasmussen =

Danish rower

Medal record

Men's rowing

Representing Denmark

Olympic Games
Bronze medal – third place	1984 Los Angeles	Coxless four

Per Rasmussen (born 2 February 1959 in Svendborg) is a Danish rower.

At the 1984 Olympics he won bronze medals in coxless four rowing together with Michael Jessen, Lars Nielsen and Erik Christiansen. They were beaten by New Zealand, who won gold medals and USA who won silver.
