= Erik Christiansen =

Danish rower

Medal record

Men's rowing

Representing Denmark

Olympic Games
| Bronze medal – third place | 1984 Los Angeles | Coxless four |

Erik Christiansen (born 20 September 1956 in Copenhagen) is a Danish former rower. He represented the rowing club Roklubben Kvik.

At the 1984 Olympics he won bronze medals in coxless four rowing together with Michael Jessen, Per Rasmussen and Lars Nielsen. They were beaten by New Zealand, who won gold medals and the USA who won silver.
