= Timothy Turner (disambiguation) =

Timothy Turner (1585–1677) was an English judge.

Timothy Turner or Tim Turner may also refer to:

- Timothy Turner (actor), voice actor featured in shows including The Many Adventures of Winnie the Pooh
- Tim Turner (1924–1987), British actor
- Tim Turner (Canadian rower) (born 1959)
- Tim Turner (English rower) (fl. 1938)
- Timmy T. Turner, fictional TV character (The Fairly OddParents)
- William Irving Turner (1890–1950), U.S. Forest Service architect known as Tim Turner
- Tim Turner (politician), American politician from Oklahoma
- Tim Turner (racing driver) (born 1969), American stock car racing driver
