= Megan Robertson =

Megan Robertson may refer to:

- Megan Robertson (rowing)
- Megan Robertson (scientist)
