= Neil Gibson (rower) =

New Zealand rower (1962–1999)

Personal information
- Nationality: New Zealand
- Born: Neil Stanley Gibson; 25 March 1962 Blenheim, New Zealand
- Died: 3 January 1999 (aged 36)
- Height: 191 cm (6 ft 3 in)
- Weight: 88 kg (194 lb)
Medal record
Men's rowing
Representing New Zealand
Commonwealth Games
| Silver medal – second place | 1986 Edinburgh | Coxless four |
| Bronze medal – third place | 1986 Edinburgh | Eight |

Neil Stanley Gibson (25 March 1962 – 3 January 1999) was a New Zealand rower.

Gibson was born in 1962 in Blenheim, New Zealand. In 1986 he won a silver medal in the coxless four at the Commonwealth Games in Edinburgh in a boat with Shane O'Brien, Andrew Stevenson, and Don Symon. He also won a bronze medal with the men's eight.

He represented New Zealand at the 1988 Summer Olympics in the coxless four in a team with Campbell Clayton-Greene, Bill Coventry, and Geoff Cotter, where they came seventh. He is listed as New Zealand Olympian athlete number 552 by the New Zealand Olympic Committee.

He died on 3 January 1999 in Christchurch of cancer.
