= Lars Nielsen (rower) =

Danish rower (born 1960)

Medal record

Men's rowing

Representing Denmark

Olympic Games
Bronze medal – third place	1984 Los Angeles	Coxless four

Lars Nielsen (born 3 November 1960) is a Danish rower. He represented to rowing club Roforeningen KVIK.

At the 1984 Olympics he won bronze medals in coxless four rowing together with Michael Jessen, Per Rasmussen and Erik Christiansen. They were beaten by New Zealand, who won gold medals and USA who won silver.
