= 1983 World Rowing Championships =

International rowing event

- Venue: Wedau
- Location: Duisburg, West Germany
- Dates: 3 to 4 September

The 1983 World Rowing Championships were World Rowing Championships that were held from 3 to 4 September 1983 at Wedau in Duisburg, West Germany.

== Medal summary ==
=== Men's events ===
Event	Gold	Time	Silver	Time	Bronze	Time
M1x	West Germany; Peter-Michael Kolbe	6:49.88	East Germany; Uwe Mund	6:51.70	United States; Christopher Wood	6:54.30
M2x	East Germany; Thomas Lange (b); Uwe Heppner (s)	6:20.17	Norway; Rolf Thorsen (b); Alf Hansen (s)	6:23.43	West Germany; Andreas Schmelz (b); Georg Agrikola (s)	6:23.63
M4x	West Germany; Albert Hedderich (b); Raimund Hörmann (2); Dieter Wiedenmann (3); Michael Dürsch (s)	5:45.97	East Germany; Karl-Heinz Bußert (b); Martin Winter (2); Rüdiger Reiche (3); Joachim Dreifke (s)	5:47.87	Italy; Piero Poli (b); Renato Gaeta (2); Antonio Dell'Aquila (3); Stefano Lari (s)	5:49.79
M2+	East Germany; Thomas Greiner (b); Ullrich Dießner (s); Andreas Gregor (c)	6:49.75	Soviet Union; Stasys Narušaitis (b); Ihar Maystrenka (s); Pyotr Petrinich (c)	6:53.23	Italy; Carmine Abbagnale (b); Giuseppe Abbagnale (s); Giuseppe Di Capua (c)	6:55.45
M2-	East Germany; Carl Ertel (b); Ulf Sauerbrey (s)	6:35.85	Soviet Union; Viktor Pereverzev (b); Gennadi Kryuçkin (s)	6:37.92	Norway; Hans Magnus Grepperud (b); Sverre Løken (s) (s)	6:39.72
M4+	New Zealand; Conrad Robertson (b); Greg Johnston (2); Keith Trask (3); Les O'Connell (s); Brett Hollister (c)	6:13.89	East Germany; Dietmar Schiller (b); Joerg Friedrich (2); Bernd Niesecke (3); Bernd Eichwurzel (s); Klaus-Dieter Ludwig (c)	6:16.29	Soviet Union; Sergey Frolov (b); Jonas Pinskus (2); Jonas Narmontas (3); Vladimir Semin (s); Vladimir Nizhegorodov (c)	6:16.98
M4-	West Germany; Norbert Keßlau (b); Volker Grabow (2); Jörg Puttlitz (3); Guido Grabow (s)	5:57.02	Soviet Union; Nikolay Pimenov (b); Aleksandr Kulagin (2); Yuriy Pimenov (3); Žoržs Tikmers (s)	5:57.39	Sweden; Anders Wilgotson (b); Hans Svensson (2); Lars-Åke Lindqvist (3); Anders Larson (s)	6:01.54
M8+	New Zealand; Mike Stanley (b); Andrew Stevenson (2); Dave Rodger (3); Roger White-Parsons (4); Chris White (5); Barrie Mabbott (6); George Keys (7); Nigel Atherfold (s); Andy Hay (c)	5:34.39	East Germany; Klaus Büttner (b); Uwe Gasch (2); Gert Uebeler (3); Karsten Schmeling (4); Ralf Brudel (5); Harald Jährling (6); Jürgen Seyfarth (7); Bernd Höing (s); Hendrik Reiher (c)	5:35.94	Australia; Samuel Patten (b); Bruce Keynes (2); Ian Edmunds (3); David Doyle (4); James Battersby (5); Tim Willoughby (6); Ion Popa (7); John Quigley (s); Gavin Thredgold (c)	5:38.04
Lightweight events
LM1x	Denmark; Bjarne Eltang	7:07.35	Great Britain; John Melvin	7:09.84	West Germany; Gerd Naujoks	7:10.08
LM2x	Italy; Francesco Esposito (b); Ruggero Verroca (s)	06:25.42	France; Luc Crispon (b); Thierry Renault (s)	6:30.73	Switzerland; Roland Rosset (b); Pius Z'rotz (s)	06:31.92
LM4-	Spain; Alberto Molina (b); Luis María Moreno (2); José María de Marco Pérez (3); Juan María Altuna (s)	6:16.47	Great Britain; Christopher Bates (b); Carl Smith (2); Ian Wilson (3); Stuart Forbes (s)	6:19.13	Denmark; Richard Biller (b); Michael Djervig (2); Vagn Nielsen (3); Karsten Kobbernagel (s)	6:19.48
LM8+	Spain; Alejandro Moya (b); José Manuel Cañete (2); Eulogio Génova (3); Carlos Muniesa (4); José Crespo (5); Enrique Briones (6); Víctor Llorente (7); Benito Elizalde (s); José Rojí (c)	5:45.05	Australia; Brian Digby (b); Paul Harvey (2); Greg Raszyk (3); Richard Hay (4); Peter Antonie (5); Bruce House (6); Ian Jordan (7); Stephen Spurling (s); Graeme Barns (c)	5:46.75	Denmark; Mikael Espersen (b); Kim Hagsted (2); Ivar Mølgaard (3); Leif Jacobsen (4); Søren Hansson (5); Flemming Jensen (6); Jan Christensen (7); Bent Fransson (s); Henrik Kruse (c)	5:46.86

=== Women's events ===
Event	Gold	Time	Silver	Time	Bronze	Time
W1x	East Germany; Jutta Hampe	3:36.51	Soviet Union; Irina Fetisova	3:37.79	United States; Virginia Gilder	3:39.05
W2x	East Germany; Jutta Schenk (b); Martina Schröter (s)	3:13.44	Soviet Union; Yelena Bratishko (b); Antonina Makhina-Dumtcheva (s)	3:14.28	Romania; Marioara Ciobanu-Popescu (b); Elisabeta Lipă (s)	3:15.45
W4x+	Soviet Union; Tatiana Bachkatova (b); Olga Kaspina (2); Yelena Khloptseva (3); Larisa Popova (s); Maria Zemskova-Korotkova (c)	3:02.48	East Germany; Kerstin Kirst (b); Kerstin Pieloth (2); Cornelia Linse (3); Sylvia Schwabe (s); Andrea Rost (c)	3:04.51	Bulgaria; Stefka Madina (b); Teodora Lazarova (2); Margarita Dobtcheva (3); Violeta Ninova (s); Greta Georgieva (c)	3:10.69
W2-	East Germany; Marita Sandig (b); Silvia Fröhlich (s)	3:26.68	Romania; Rodica Arba (b); Elena Horvat (s)	3:32.13	Canada; Tricia Smith (b); Elizabeth Craig-Eaton (s)	3:33.52
W4+	East Germany; Claudia Noack (b); Iris Rudolph (2); Sigrid Anders (3); Carola Miseler (s); Carolina Richter (c)	3:11.18	Romania; Florica Lavric (b); Maria Tanase-Fricioiu (2); Chira Apostol (3); Olga Homegi-Bularda (s); Viorica Veres (c)	3:14.11	Soviet Union; Feodossia Kaleinikova (b); Valentina Semenova (2); Svetlana Semyonova (3); Angelina Kaolikauskaite (s); Nina Cheremisina (c)	3:14.36
W8+	Soviet Union; Sarmīte Stone (b); Lidiya Averyanova (2); Ludmila Konopleva (3); Marina Studneva (4); Nina Umanets (5); Elena Tereshina (6); Nataliya Yatsenko (7); Elena Makushkina (s); Valentina Khokhlova (c)	2:56.22	United States; Kristen Thorsness (b); Patricia Spratlin (2); Shyril O'Steen (3); Carie Graves (4); Carol Bower (5); Kristine Norelius (6); Jan Harville (7); Harriet Metcalf (s); Valerie McClain-Ward (c)	2:58.14	East Germany; Susann Heinicke (b); Viola Kestler (2); Annekatrin Jage (3); Karin Metze-Ullbricht (4); Steffi Götzelt (5); Carola Lichey (6); Sabine Portius (7); Ramona Hein (s); Kirsten Strohbach (c)	2:59.06

== Medals table ==
Seventeen nations won medals of the championships.

Place	Nation	1st place, gold medalist(s)	2nd place, silver medalist(s)	3rd place, bronze medalist(s)	Total
1	East Germany	7	5	1	13
2	West Germany	3	0	2	5
3	Soviet Union	2	5	2	9
4	Spain	2	0	0	2
4	New Zealand	2	0	0	2
6	Denmark	1	0	2	3
6	Italy	1	0	2	3
8	Romania	0	2	1	3
9	Great Britain	0	2	0	2
10	United States	0	1	2	3
11	Australia	0	1	1	2
11	Norway	0	1	1	2
13	France	0	1	0	1
14	Bulgaria	0	0	1	1
14	Canada	0	0	1	1
14	Switzerland	0	0	1	1
14	Sweden	0	0	1	1
Total		18	18	18	54
