= John Bentley (rower) =

Australian rower

Personal information
- Nationality: Australian
- Born: 16 November 1957 (age 67)

Sport
- Sport: Rowing

John Bentley (born 16 November 1957) is an Australian rower. He competed in the men's coxless four event at the 1984 Summer Olympics.
