= Campbell Clayton-Greene =

New Zealand rower (born 1967)

Personal information
- Born: 26 March 1967 (age 59)

Sport
- Sport: Rowing
Medal record
Men's rowing
Representing New Zealand
World Rowing Championships
| Bronze medal – third place | 1989 Bled | M4- |

Campbell I. Clayton-Greene (born 26 March 1967) is a former New Zealand rower. He represented New Zealand at the 1988 Summer Olympics in the coxless four in a team with Geoff Cotter, Bill Coventry, and Neil Gibson, where they came seventh. At the 1989 World Rowing Championships at Bled, Yugoslavia, he won a Bronze in the men's four with Ian Wright, Alastair Mackintosh, and Bill Coventry.
