= José Manuel Cañete =

Spanish lightweight rower

Jose Manuel Canete Lopez
Sport
- Sport: Rowing
Medal record
Men's rowing
Representing Spain
World Rowing Championships
Gold medal – first place	1983 Duisburg	Lwt eight
Bronze medal – third place	1984 Montreal	Lwt eight
Bronze medal – third place	1985 Hazewinkel	Lwt eight

Jose Manuel Canete Lopez is a Spanish lightweight rower. He won a gold medal at the 1983 World Rowing Championships in Duisburg with the lightweight men's eight.
