= Gayle Toogood =

Australian rower

Sport
- Country: Australia
- Sport: Rowing
- Club: Melbourne University Boat Club
Medal record
Women's rowing
Representing Australia
World Rowing Championships
Silver medal – second place	1984 Montreal	LW8+
Bronze medal – third place	1985 Hazewinkel	LW4-
Commonwealth Games
Silver medal – second place	1986 Edinburgh	LW4-

Gayle Toogood is an Australian former lightweight rower. She was a thirteen-time national champion and competed at World Championships over a ten-year period from 1984 to 1994. She won medals at two World Championships and at the 1986 Commonwealth Games.

== Club and state rowing ==
Toogood's senior club rowing was from the Melbourne University Boat Club.

Toogood first made Victorian state representation in 1982 in the lightweight four which contested and won the Victoria Cup at the Interstate Regatta within the Australian Rowing Championships. She raced that event for Victoria on a total of nine occasions through to 1994 for eight victories. She stroked those crews on six occasions.

In Melbourne University colours she contested national championship lightweight events at the Australian Rowing Championships on a number of occasions. She won the national lightweight coxed four title in 1982, 1983, 1984, 1986 and 1987. She contested lightweight coxless pair championships in 1983, 1986 and 1987 and rowed in the coxed four to a second place in 1985.

== International representative rowing ==
Toogood made her Australian representative debut in the lightweight eight at the inaugural world lightweight championships - the 1984 World Rowing Championships in Montreal. The women's eight was a demonstration rather than a championship event but the Australian girls with Toogood in the seven seat rowed to a second place. The following year at Hazelwinkel 1985 - the first Rowing World Championships to include lightweight events within the overall programme - Toogood rowed in the bow seat of the lightweight coxless four which took the bronze medal.

For the next two years Toogood held a seat in the Australian women's lightweight coxless four. She stroked that crew to a fourth placing at the 1986 World Rowing Championships and that same year at the 1986 Commonwealth Games in Edinburgh, Toogood led the four to a silver medal. She was in the bow seat of the four at the 1987 World Rowing Championships in Copenhagen when they again finished fourth.

Following a long break from elite rowing Toogood was back in representative contention in 1993 when she was a reserve for the lightweight women's sweep crews who went to the 1993 World Championships. In Indianapolis 1994 Toogood made her last Australian representative appearance when she was again selected in the bow seat of the lightweight coxless four. That boat finished in sixth place.
