= Eulogio Génova =

Spanish rower

Personal information
- Born: Eulogio Génova Emezabal; 4 October 1960 (age 65)

Sport
- Sport: Rowing
Medal record
Men's rowing
Representing Spain
World Rowing Championships
Gold medal – first place	1983 Duisburg	Lwt eight
Bronze medal – third place	1984 Montreal	Lwt eight
Bronze medal – third place	1985 Hazewinkel	Lwt eight

Eulogio Génova Emezabal (born 4 October 1960) is a Spanish lightweight rower. He won a gold medal at the 1983 World Rowing Championships in Duisburg with the lightweight men's eight.
