= Daniel Schwarz (disambiguation) =

Daniel or Danny Schwarz may refer to:

- Daniel Schwarz (bandleader) (1851–1885), German trumpeter, and band leader
- Daniel R. Schwarz (born 1941), American professor of English literature
- Danny Schwarz (born 1975), German footballer
- Danny Schwarz (model) (born 1987), English model
