= Bartolomé Alarcón =

Spanish rower

Personal information
- Nationality: Spanish
- Born: 19 March 1963 (age 62); Baracaldo, Spain

Sport
- Sport: Rowing

Bartolomé Alarcón (born 19 March 1963) is a Spanish rower. He competed in the men's coxless four event at the 1988 Summer Olympics.
