= Jan Christensen =

Danish rower

Sport
- Sport: Rowing
Medal record
Men's rowing
Representing Denmark
World Rowing Championships
| Gold medal – first place | 1984 Montreal | Lwt eight |
| Silver medal – second place | 1980 Hazewinkel | Lwt four |
| Silver medal – second place | 1982 Lucerne | Lwt eight |
| Bronze medal – third place | 1983 Duisburg | Lwt eight |

Jan Christensen is a Danish lightweight rower. He won a gold medal at the 1984 World Rowing Championships in Montreal with the lightweight men's eight.
