= Carola Lichey =

East German rower

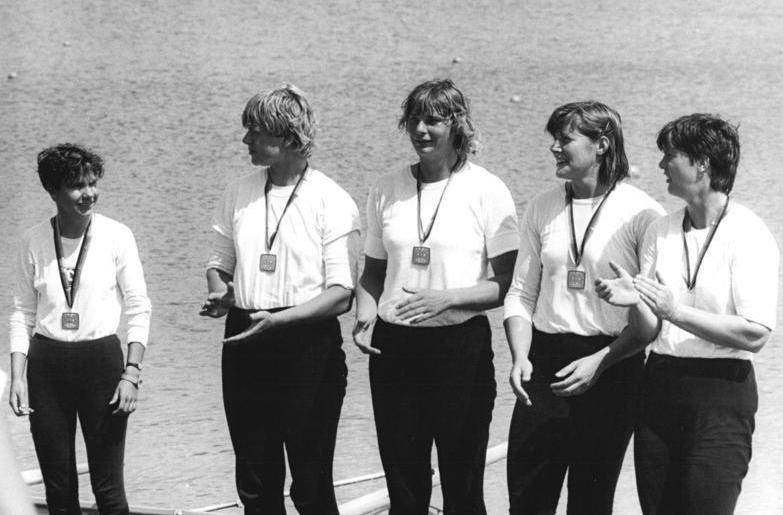
- Lichey (right) in 1985

Personal information
- Born: 30 March 1961 (age 65) Brandenburg, Germany
- Height: 1.80 m (5 ft 11 in)
- Weight: 84 kg (185 lb)

Sport
- Sport: Rowing
- Club: SG Dynamo Potsdam
Medal record
Representing East Germany
World Rowing Championships
Bronze medal – third place	1983 Duisburg	Eight
Gold medal – first place	1985 Hazewinkel	Coxed four
Silver medal – second place	1986 Nottingham	Coxed four

Carola Lichey (born 30 March 1961) is a retired East German rower who won one gold, one silver and one bronze medal at the world championships of 1983–1986. In October 1986, she was awarded a Patriotic Order of Merit in gold (first class) for her sporting success.
