= Wolfgang Birkner (rower) =

German lightweight rower

Personal information
- Born: 24 January 1960 (age 66)

Sport
- Sport: Rowing
Medal record
Men's rowing
Representing West Germany
World Rowing Championships
Gold medal – first place	1985 Hazewinkel	Lwt men's four
Silver medal – second place	1984 Montreal	Lwt men's four
Silver medal – second place	1986 Nottingham	Lwt men's eight
Silver medal – second place	1987 Copenhagen	Lwt men's eight

Wolfgang Birkner (born 24 January 1960) is a German lightweight rower. He won a gold medal at the 1985 World Rowing Championships in Hazewinkel with the lightweight men's four.
