= Duncan Fisher =

Australian rower

Personal information
- Nationality: Australian
- Born: 17 July 1962
- Died: 23 December 1984 (aged 22)

Sport
- Sport: Rowing

Achievements and titles
- Olympic finals: 1984 Los Angeles M4-
- National finals: King's Cup 1984

Duncan Fisher (17 July 1962 – 23 December 1984) was an Australian rower. He competed in the men's coxless four event at the 1984 Summer Olympics. He was killed in a car crash.

== Career ==
Fisher was educated at Brisbane's Anglican Church Grammar School where he took up rowing. His senior club rowing was from the University of Queensland Boat Club.

State representative honours and a national title win first came for Fisher in 1981 when he was selected to represent Queensland ib the men's youth eight contesting the Noel Wilkinson Trophy at the Interstate Regatta within the Australian Rowing Championships. That crew won. He made another appearance in the Queensland youth eight in 1982.

Fisher made his first Australian representative appearance in the 1983 Trans Tasman series of match races between Australian and New Zealand U23 crews. Fisher rowed at four in the Australian M8+ which won all four of its match races. 1984 saw Fisher elevated to the Queensland men's senior eight to contest the King's Cup at the Interstate regatta and also saw his selection for the Los Angeles 1984 Olympics in Australia's coxless four. They showed good form in the lead up competitions but finished in overall eighth place in Los Angeles.

Late in that year when Fisher experienced senior representative success for Queensland and Australia, he was killed in a car crash.
