= Tang Hongwei =

Chinese rower

Personal information
- Nationality: Chinese
- Born: 15 April 1961 (age 64)

Sport
- Sport: Rowing

Tang Hongwei (born 15 April 1961) is a Chinese rower. He competed in the men's coxless four event at the 1984 Summer Olympics.
