= Darby Berkhout =

Canadian rower

Personal information
- Born: 20 May 1966 (age 59); Port Colborne, Ontario, Canada

Sport
- Sport: Rowing

Darby Berkhout (born 20 May 1966) is a Canadian rower. He competed in the men's coxless four event at the 1988 Summer Olympics.
