= Sven Schwarz =

Sven Schwarz may refer to:

- Sven Schwarz (rower)
- Sven Schwarz (swimmer)
