= Jaekel =

Jaekel is a surname. Notable people with the surname include:

- Goya Jaekel (born 1974), German footballer
- Otto Jaekel (1863–1929), German paleontologist and geologist
- Thomas Jaekel (born 1959), German rower
