= Ian Wright (rower) =

New Zealand rower (born 1961)

Personal information
- Born: Ian Andrew Wright; 9 December 1961 (age 64) Wanganui, New Zealand
- Occupation: Rowing coach
- Height: 189 cm (6 ft 2 in)
- Weight: 90 kg (198 lb)

Sport
- Sport: Rowing
- Club: Waikato Rowing Club
Medal record
Men's rowing
Representing New Zealand
Olympic Games
| Bronze medal – third place | 1988 Seoul | Coxed four |
Commonwealth Games
| Silver medal – second place | 1986 Edinburgh | Coxless pair |
| Bronze medal – third place | 1986 Edinburgh | Eight |
World Championships
| Bronze medal – third place | 1989 Bled | Coxless four |

Ian Andrew Wright (born 9 December 1961) is a former New Zealand rower who won an Olympic bronze medal at the 1988 Summer Olympics in Seoul. Wright won 31 national titles during his career. After his rowing career ended, he became a coach and his Swiss lightweight men's four team won gold at the 2016 Summer Olympics. He was announced as Australia's head rowing coach in September 2016. He immediately coached the Australian men's four to a gold medal at the 2017 world rowing championships in Sarasota, Florida.

== Rowing career ==
Wright was born in 1961 in Wanganui, New Zealand. He moved to Hamilton and became a member of the Hamilton Rowing Club. He had Harry Mahon as his rowing coach.

Wright won two medals at the 1986 Commonwealth Games in Edinburgh. He won silver with Barrie Mabbott in the coxless pair and bronze in the men's eight. At the 1988 Summer Olympics, Wright won bronze in the coxed four along with George Keys, Greg Johnston, Chris White, and Andrew Bird (cox).

At the 1989 World Rowing Championships at Bled, Yugoslavia, he won a bronze in the men's four with Bill Coventry, Alastair Mackintosh, and Campbell Clayton-Greene.

At the 1992 Summer Olympics in Barcelona, Wright finished 11th in the coxed four. At the 1996 Summer Olympics in Atlanta, he came 13th in the coxless four.

During his career, he has won a total of 31 New Zealand titles with the eight (12 titles), coxed four (7 titles), coxless four (7 titles), coxless pair (2 titles), and coxed pair (3 titles).

== Coaching career ==
A teacher, Wright was involved in rowing coaching school and age-group at national level. He coached several Maadi Cup winning squads at both St Paul's Collegiate School and Hamilton Boys' High School. He is described as "intense" and speaks his mind, which does not sit well with some people. He is held in high regard by those who have been coached by him.

From 2005 to 2009, Wright was head coach at the Melbourne University Boat Club. Wright worked for Rowing New Zealand as coach for the men's eight, and was head coach at the Waikato Regional Performance Centre with training at Lake Karapiro. In late 2014, Wright was appointed head national coach of Switzerland. He led the lightweight men's four to become the 2015 world champions. A year later, the same boat won Olympic gold at the Rio Olympics. In September 2016, he was appointed head rowing coach for Australia's men. Within a year of Wright starting in Australia, the Australian men's four—consisting of Joshua Hicks, Spencer Turrin, Jack Hargreaves and Alexander Hill—won gold at the 2017 World Rowing Championships in Sarasota, Florida. Until 2017, Australia had not won a World Championship in the Men's Coxless Four since 1991 in Vienna, Austria.

In July 2018, Wright coached the Australian Men's Eight to a win in the Grand Challenge Cup at Henley Royal Regatta. Beating the Romanian National Eight in the Final, Australia would also go on to claim the course record in a time of 5:53 while being in the arguably less-favoured Buckinghamshire lane. This same year at the 2018 World Rowing Championships in Plovdiv, Bulgaria the Australian Men's Four won another gold medal giving them back to back World Champion titles.

In 2021, Wright returned to the Swiss national rowing team and at the 2024 Paris Olympics, Wright led the men's pair crew of Roman Röösli and Andrin Gulich to a bronze medal.

In 2025, Wright was announced as the head coach of China's national rowing team, leading their men's four to a gold in the 2026 World Cup II regatta.
