= Yoon Nam-ho =

South Korean rower (born 1969)

Personal information
- Nationality: South Korean
- Born: 7 March 1969 (age 56)

Sport
- Sport: Rowing

Yoon Nam-ho (born 7 March 1969) is a South Korean rower. He competed in the men's coxless four event at the 1988 Summer Olympics.
