= Ivan Vysotskiy =

Soviet rower

Personal information
- Nationality: Ukrainian
- Born: 7 July 1962 (age 62); Kalytyntsi, Ukrainian SSR, Soviet Union

Sport
- Sport: Rowing

Ivan Vysotskiy (born 7 July 1962) is a Ukrainian rower. He competed in the men's coxless four event at the 1988 Summer Olympics.
