= José María Segurola =

Spanish rower

Personal information
- Nationality: Spanish
- Born: 27 April 1966 (age 58)

Sport
- Sport: Rowing

José María Segurola (born 27 April 1966) is a Spanish rower. He competed in the men's coxless four event at the 1988 Summer Olympics.
