= Folke Brundin =

Swedish rower

Personal information
- Nationality: Swedish
- Born: 12 April 1963 Partille, Sweden

Sport
- Sport: Rowing

Folke Brundin (12 April 1963 – 29 January 2025) was a Swedish rower. He competed in the men's coxless four event at the 1988 Summer Olympics.
