= Raoul Rodriguez =

American rower

Personal information
- Full name: Raoul Pablo Rodriguez
- Born: February 1, 1963 (age 63) Ann Arbor, Michigan, U.S.
- Education: Tulane University
- Height: 1.93 m (6 ft 4 in)
- Weight: 96 kg (212 lb)

Sport
- Sport: Rowing
- Club: Penn AC
Medal record
Men's rowing
Representing United States
Olympic Games
Silver medal – second place	1988 Seoul	Coxless four
World Rowing Championships
Silver medal – second place	1989 Bled	Coxless four
Pan American Games
Silver medal – second place	1991 Havana	Coxless fours

Raoul Pablo Rodriguez (born February 1, 1963) is an American rower. He won a silver medal at the 1988 Olympic Games in the men's coxless fours, along with Thomas Bohrer, Richard Kennelly, and David Krmpotich.

Born in Ann Arbor, Michigan, he now lives in New York State. His son Augustine Rodriguez is also an international rower.
