= Jonathan Clift =

British rower

Personal information
- Nationality: British
- Born: Littleborough, Greater Manchester

Sport
- Sport: Rowing
- Club: Nottinghamshire County RA

Marcus 'Jonathan' Clift is a male retired British rower. Clift competed in the men's coxless four event at the 1984 Summer Olympics.

His brother is Olympian Adam Clift.
