= Sergio Caropreso =

Italian rower

Personal information
- Nationality: Italian
- Born: 30 November 1961 (age 64) Naples, Italy

Sport
- Sport: Rowing
Medal record
Representing Italy
World Rowing Championships
Silver medal – second place	1985 Hazewinkel	Eights
Summer Universiade
Gold medal – first place	1987 Zagreb	Eights

Sergio Caropreso (born 30 November 1961) is an Italian rower. He competed in the men's coxless four event at the 1988 Summer Olympics.
