= Christos Christomanos =

Greek rower (born 1963)

Personal information
- Nationality: Greek
- Born: 29 July 1963 (age 61)

Sport
- Sport: Rowing

Christos Christomanos (born 29 July 1963) is a Greek rower. He competed in the men's coxless four event at the 1988 Summer Olympics.
