= Liu Baogang =

Chinese rower

Personal information
- Nationality: Chinese
- Born: 10 September 1963 (age 61)

Sport
- Sport: Rowing

Liu Baogang (born 10 September 1963) is a Chinese rower. He competed in the men's coxless four event at the 1984 Summer Olympics.
