= Richard Kennelly =

American rower

Personal information
- Full name: Richard Bayard Kennelly, Jr.
- Born: July 4, 1965 (age 61) Boston, Massachusetts, U.S.
- Education: Harvard College
Medal record
Men's rowing
Representing United States
Olympic Games
| Silver medal – second place | 1988 Seoul | Coxless four |

Richard Bayard Kennelly, Jr. (born July 4, 1965) is an American rower. He won a silver medal at the 1988 Olympic Games in the men's coxless fours, along with Thomas Bohrer David Krmpotich, and Raoul Rodriguez. His team also placed 4th in the 1992 Summer Olympics.

Kennelly was born in Boston, Massachusetts. He now coaches the boys crew program at Phillips Academy Andover.

He rowed for St. Paul's School (New Hampshire) and then Harvard (Class of 1987). He returned to school in 1991 at the University of Virginia, graduating in 1995, with dual degrees (a masters in environmental planning and a Juris Doctor degree).
