= Georgios Fotou =

Greek rower (born 1969)

Personal information
- Nationality: Greek
- Born: 5 July 1969 (age 55)

Sport
- Sport: Rowing

Georgios Fotou (born 5 July 1969) is a Greek rower. He competed in the men's coxless four event at the 1988 Summer Olympics.
