= Leif Jacobsen =

Danish rower

Sport
- Sport: Rowing
Medal record
Men's rowing
Representing Denmark
World Rowing Championships
Gold medal – first place	1984 Montreal	Lwt eight
Bronze medal – third place	1983 Duisburg	Lwt eight
Bronze medal – third place	1986 Nottingham	Lwt eight

Leif Jacobsen is a Danish lightweight rower. He won a gold medal at the 1984 World Rowing Championships in Montreal with the lightweight men's eight.
