= Alberto Molina =

Spanish rower

Alberto Molina Castillo
Personal information
- Born: Seville

Sport
- Sport: Rowing
Medal record
Men's rowing
Representing Spain
World Rowing Championships
Gold medal – first place	1983 Duisburg	Lwt men's four
Gold medal – first place	1984 Montreal	Lwt men's four
Bronze medal – third place	1981 Munich	Lwt men's eight
Bronze medal – third place	1982 Lucerne	Lwt men's eight
Bronze medal – third place	1986 Nottingham	Lwt men's four

Alberto Molina Castillo is a Spanish lightweight rower. He won a gold medal at the 1983 World Rowing Championships in Duisburg with the lightweight men's four.
