= Lee Hyung-ki (rower) =

South Korean rower (born 1969)

Personal information
- Nationality: South Korean
- Born: 28 May 1969 (age 56)
- Education: Pukyong National University

Sport
- Sport: Rowing

Korean name
- Hangul: 이형기
- Hanja: 李炯基
- RR: I Hyeonggi
- MR: I Hyŏnggi

Lee Hyung-ki (born 28 May 1969) is a South Korean rower. He competed in the men's coxless four event at the 1988 Summer Olympics.
