= Hong Chul-ho =

South Korean rower

Personal information
- Nationality: South Korean
- Born: 2 June 1968 (age 57)

Sport
- Sport: Rowing

Korean name
- Hangul: 홍철호
- Hanja: 洪鐵湖
- RR: Hong Cheolho
- MR: Hong Ch'ŏrho

Hong Chul-ho (Korean: 홍철호; born 2 June 1968) is a South Korean rower. He competed in the men's coxless four event at the 1988 Summer Olympics.
