= Bill Coventry =

New Zealand rower (born 1967)

Personal information
- Born: William Michael Coventry; 26 January 1967 (age 59) Hamilton, New Zealand
- Height: 185 cm (6 ft 1 in)
- Weight: 81 kg (179 lb)
- Spouse: Lynley Hannen

Sport
- Sport: Rowing
Medal record
Men's rowing
Representing New Zealand
World Rowing Championships
Bronze medal – third place	1989 Bled	M4-

William Michael Coventry (born 26 January 1967) is a former New Zealand rower.

Coventry was born in Hamilton in 1967. He represented New Zealand at the 1988 Summer Olympics in the coxless four in a team with Campbell Clayton-Greene, Geoff Cotter, and Neil Gibson, where they came seventh. At the 1989 World Rowing Championships at Bled, Yugoslavia, he won a Bronze in the men's four with Ian Wright, Alastair Mackintosh, and Campbell Clayton-Greene.

He married fellow Olympic rower Lynley Hannen and they live with their children in Nelson.
