= Fernando Fantoni =

Brazilian rower

Personal information
- Born: 24 June 1964 (age 60); Porto Alegre, Brazil

Sport
- Sport: Rowing
- Club: Grêmio Náutico União; Club de Regatas Vasco da Gama; Flamengo

Fernando Fantoni (born 24 June 1964) is a Brazilian rower. He competed in the men's coxless four event at the 1988 Summer Olympics.
