= Johan Leutscher =

Dutch rower

Personal information
- Nationality: Dutch
- Born: 26 July 1964 (age 60); Drachten, Netherlands

Sport
- Sport: Rowing

Johan Leutscher (born 26 July 1964) is a Dutch rower. He competed in the men's coxless four event at the 1988 Summer Olympics.
