= James Lowe (rower) =

Australian rower

Personal information
- Nationality: Australian
- Born: 27 January 1956 (age 69)

Sport
- Sport: Rowing
- Club: Melbourne Uni Boat Club; Banks Rowing Club

Achievements and titles
- Olympic finals: 1980 Moscow M8+ 1984 Los Angeles M4-
- National finals: King's Cup 8 times (1976–86)

James Lowe (born 27 January 1956) is an Australian former Olympic representative rower. He was a four time national champion, represented twice at World Rowing Championships and competed at the 1980 Summer Olympics and the 1984 Summer Olympics.

== School, club & state rowing ==
Lowe was educated at Geelong Grammar School where he took up rowing, He rowed in that school's first VIII in both of his senior years of 1973 and 1974, winning the Victorian school's Head of the River in 1974. His senior club rowing was from the Melbourne University Boat Club and later, the Banks Rowing Club in Melbourne. In 1975 he rowed in the four seat of the MUBC senior VIII which won the men's eight championship at that year's Australian University Rowing Championships.

Victorian state representative honours first came for Lowe in 1974 when the entire Geelong Grammar first VIII was selected to represent Victoria as the men's youth eight contesting the Noel Wilkinson Trophy at the Interstate Regatta within the Australian Rowing Championships. That crew placed third. In 1976 Lowe moved into the Victorian men's senior eight which contested the King's Cup at the annual Interstate Regatta. He made eight King's Cup appearances for Victoria between 1976 and 1986 and saw victories in 1979, 1980 and 1986.

He won a national championship in MUBC colours in the men's coxless four in 1981 and also took the bronze in a coxed four. By 1984 he was rowing for Banks and they won the silver in a men's coxed four at the Australian Championships that year.

== International representative rowing ==
Lowe made his Australian representative debut in 1978 when selected in a coxless four to race at the 1978 World Rowing Championships on Lake Karapiro. That crew finished in ninth place. For the 1979 World Rowing Championships in Bled, the strong Victorian showing in that year's King's Cup saw Lowe amongst a number of Victorians selected into the Australian men's eight. An injury during the campaign to Rob Lang resulted in the squad's selected sculler Ted Hale stepping into the five seat of the eight. That crew placed third in their semi-final and fourth in the final.

For the 1980 Moscow Olympics the new Australian Director of Coaching Reinhold Batschi utilised small boating racing criteria and selected an eight with rowers from three states including Lowe in the six seat. The Australian eight finished in fifth place in the Olympic final. For the 1984 Los Angeles Olympics Lowe was selected in Australia's coxless four. They showed good form in the lead up competitions but finished in overall eighth place in Los Angeles.

== Post competitive rowing ==
Lowe rowed on after the 1984 Olympics and raced at the 1986 Australian Rowing Championships in the Victorian King's Cup eight and in a composite coxed four, however he did not represent again for Australia. From 1989 to 1992 he was a selector for Victorian King's Cup crews and he was involved in the selection of Australia's Oarsome Foursome in their original 1990 combination.

As an administrator and club-man Lowe held a tenure as Treasurer of the Victorian Rowing Association from 1989 to 2005 and has held every senior committee position at the Banks Rowing Club at some point. He has been heavily involved in the growth of Masters Rowing in Australia and Victoria and has raced and won at numerous Australian and International Masters Games and Championships.
