= Sergey Smirnov (rower) =

Soviet rower

Personal information
- Nationality: Soviet
- Born: 19 January 1961 (age 64)

Sport
- Sport: Rowing

Sergey Smirnov (born 19 January 1961) is a Soviet rower. He competed in the men's coxless four event at the 1988 Summer Olympics.
