= Bruce Keynes =

Australian former rower

Personal information
- Nationality: Australian

Sport
- Country: Australia
- Sport: Rowing
- Club: Adelaide Rowing Club
Medal record
Men's rowing
Representing Australia
World Championships
| Bronze medal – third place | 1983 Duisburg | M8+ |

Bruce Keynes is an Australian former rower. He was a four-time Australian national champion and rowed in the Australian men's eight to a bronze medal at the 1983 World Rowing Championships.

== Club and state rowing ==
Raised in Adelaide, South Australia Keynes' senior rowing was from the Adelaide Rowing Club.

State representation first came for Keynes in 1978 in the South Australian men's eight contesting the King's Cup at the Interstate Regatta within the Australian Rowing Championships. He rowed again the South Australian men's eight in 1980, 1981, 1982 and 1983 at stroke. Those crews were victorious in the three successive years 1981 to 1983. He rowed in another South Australian King's Cup eight in 1984.

In Adelaide RC colours he contested national titles at the Australian Rowing Championships - a coxed pair in 1980; a coxless pair in 1982; a coxed four in 1980, 1981 and 1982; a coxless four in 1983. He was victorious in a composite South Australian crew for the coxed four title in 1982.

== International representative rowing ==
In 1983 Keynes was selected in the Australian eight selected within a limited squad sent to the 1983 World Rowing Championships in Duisburg Germany. The eight performed well in lead up regattas at Vichy, Ratzeburg and Nottingham. In the final at the World Championships the Australian crew drew a bad lane and lost the benefit of the tail breeze however they raced a strong second 1000m and finished in third place for a bronze medal.
