= Carlos Muniesa =

Spanish rower

Personal information
- Born: Carlos Alberto Muniesa Ferrero

Sport
- Sport: Rowing
Medal record
Men's rowing
Representing Spain
World Rowing Championships
Gold medal – first place	1983 Duisburg	Lwt eight
Bronze medal – third place	1984 Montreal	Lwt eight
Bronze medal – third place	1985 Hazewinkel	Lwt eight
Bronze medal – third place	1986 Nottingham	Lwt four

Carlos Alberto Muniesa Ferrero is a Spanish lightweight rower. He won a gold medal at the 1983 World Rowing Championships in Duisburg with the lightweight men's eight. He was Spain's National Rowing Coach from 1988 to 1990. He now teaches at the European University of Madrid.
