= Thomas Bohrer =

American rower (born 1963)

Personal information
- Full name: Thomas Robert Bohrer
- Born: August 6, 1963 (age 63) West Islip, New York, U.S.
Medal record
Men's rowing
Representing United States
Olympic Games
Silver medal – second place	1988 Seoul	Coxless four
Silver medal – second place	1992 Barcelona	Coxless four
World Rowing Championships
Silver medal – second place	1989 Bled	Coxless four
Silver medal – second place	1991 Vienna	Coxless four
Bronze medal – third place	1993 Račice	Coxless four

Thomas Robert Bohrer (born August 6, 1963) is an American rower. He has won two silver medals in the men's coxless fours. One at the 1992 Summer Olympics in Barcelona and the other at the 1988 Summer Olympics in Seoul along with Richard Kennelly, David Krmpotich, and Raoul Rodriguez. He competed for the Penn Athletic Club Rowing Association under head coach, Ted Nash (rower).

Born in West Islip, New York, he is a 1986 graduate of Florida Institute of Technology and has been head coach of Boston University men's crew since 2008. He was inducted into the Suffolk Sports Hall of Fame on Long Island in the Boating & Nautical Category with the Class of 1990.
