= Graeme Barns =

Australian rowing cox

Sport
- Country: Australia
- Sport: Rowing
- Club: Mercantile Rowing Club

Achievements and titles
- National finals: King's Cup 1983, 84, 87, 88.
Medal record
Men's rowing
Representing Australia
World Championships
Silver medal – second place	1983 Duisburg	LM8+

Graeme Barns is an Australian former rowing coxswain. He was a five time national champion, an Australian national representative and won a silver medal at the 1983 World Rowing Championships.

== Club and state rowing ==
Barn's senior rowing was from the Mercantile Rowing Club in Melbourne.

In 1981 he was selected to cox the Victorian men's youth eight who contested the Noel Wilkinson Trophy at the Interstate Regatta within the Australian Rowing Championships. In 1982 he was again in the stern of the Victorian youth eight.

In 1983 he took hold of the ropes of the Victorian men's senior eight contesting the King's Cup at the Interstate Regatta. The Victorian eight took the silver medal. In 1984 he again coxed the Victorian King's Cup eight. Barns' Mercantile clubmate David Colvin coxed the Victorian eights of 1985 and 1986 but in 1987 Barns was back in the stern of the Victorian eight which won that year's King's Cup and commenced a long period of Victorian dominance in that event. He also steered the 1988 Vic eight to a King's Cup win.

He coxed various Mercantile crews in national championship events at the Australian Rowing Championships throughout the 1980s. He won titles in a Mercantile youth four in 1981 and in the senior coxed four in 1987 and 1988. He contested an U23 eight in 1982 and further senior coxed fours in 1983 and 1984.

== International representative rowing ==
Barns made his Australian representative debut as coxswain of the 1981 coxed four who contested the Junior World Rowing Championships in Sofia. That four placed fourth. In 1983 he was in the stern of the Australian lightweight eight which won the silver medal at the 1983 World Rowing Championships in Duisburg, Germany.
