= John Bland (rower) =

British rower

Personal information
- Nationality: British
- Born: 23 August 1958 (age 67) Cannock, England
- Weight: 85 kg (187 lb)

Sport
- Sport: Rowing
- Club: Oxford University Boat Club
Medal record
Men's rowing
Representing Great Britain
World Rowing Championships
Silver medal – second place	1981 Munich	Eight

John Bland (born 23 August 1958) is a British rower. He competed in the men's coxless four event at the 1984 Summer Olympics.

He rowed for Oxford in the 1980, 1981 and 1983 Boat Races winning on each occasion. He also represented Great Britain at the 1981 and 1983 World Rowing Championships winning a silver medal in 1981

He was a three time winner at Henley Royal Regatta, including in the Grand Challenge Cup in 1981 and 1983 whilst at Oxford, and the Stewards Challenge Cup in 1984 as a member of Tyne Rowing Club.
