= Raymond Collier =

Canadian rower

Personal information
- Full name: Raymond Gordon Collier
- Nationality: Canadian
- Born: 25 October 1961 (age 63); Cranbrook, British Columbia, Canada

Sport
- Sport: Rowing

Raymond Gordon Collier (born 25 October 1961) is a Canadian rower. He competed in the men's coxless four event at the 1988 Summer Olympics.
