= Stephen Beatty (rower) =

Canadian rower

Personal information
- Born: 11 April 1959 (age 65); Woodstock, Ontario, Canada

Sport
- Sport: Rowing

Stephen Beatty (born 11 April 1959) is a Canadian rower. He competed in the men's coxless four event at the 1984 Summer Olympics.
