= Tjark de Vries =

Dutch rower (born 1965)

Personal information
- Nationality: Dutch
- Born: 17 July 1965 (age 60) Waddinxveen, Netherlands

Sport
- Sport: Rowing

Tjark de Vries (born 17 July 1965) is a Dutch rower. He competed in the men's coxless four event at the 1988 Summer Olympics.
