= Claudia Noack =

German rower (born 1961)

- Noack in 1982

Personal information
- Born: 27 September 1961 (age 64)

Sport
- Sport: Rowing
- Club: SC Berlin-Grünau
Medal record
Women's rowing
Representing East Germany
Bronze medal – third place	1982 Lucerne	Eight
Gold medal – first place	1983 Duisburg	Coxed four

Claudia Noack (born 27 September 1961) is a German rower who competed for East Germany.

Noack grew up in East Berlin. As a 12-year-old, she got a mention in the Berliner Zeitung for having kept an alleyway with steps in Altglienicke free of debris and weeds for years.

Noack rowed for SC Berlin-Grünau. At the 1978 World Rowing Junior Championships in Belgrade, she competed with the junior women's eight and won gold.

At the 1983 World Rowing Championships, she won a gold medal in the women's coxed four event.
