= Jan Rasmussen =

Danish rower

Sport
- Sport: Rowing
Medal record
Men's rowing
Representing Denmark
World Rowing Championships
| Gold medal – first place | 1984 Montreal | Lwt eight |
| Silver medal – second place | 1982 Lucerne | Lwt eight |

Jan Rasmussen is a Danish coxswain. He won a gold medal at the 1984 World Rowing Championships in Montreal with the lightweight men's eight.
