= Ted Gibson (rower) =

Canadian rower (born 1962)

Personal information
- Born: 7 June 1962 (age 64) Toronto, Ontario, Canada

Sport
- Sport: Rowing

Ted Gibson (born 7 June 1962) is a Canadian rower. He competed in the men's coxless four event at the 1984 Summer Olympics. He is currently a professor in the Department of Brain & Cognitive Sciences at the Massachusetts Institute of Technology.
