= Stacy Apfelbaum =

American rower

Stacey Apfelbaum
Sport
- Sport: Rowing
Medal record
Women's rowing
Representing United States
World Rowing Championships
Gold medal – first place	1984 Montreal	Eight

Stacey Apfelbaum is a retired American rowing cox.

Apfelbaum is a graduate of Mount Holyoke College. She was the university's coxswain for three years before she joined the US National Team. She won a gold medal at the 1984 World Rowing Championships in Montreal, Canada, with the lightweight women's eight; this was the only year that this boat class competed at World Rowing Championships.

Apfelbaum is the head rowing coach at Niskayuna High School.
