= Alastair Mackintosh =

New Zealand rower

Personal information
- Born: Alastair Campbell Mackintosh; 21 June 1968 (age 58) Wanganui, New Zealand
- Education: Wanganui Collegiate school
- Height: 191 cm (6 ft 3 in)
- Weight: 100 kg (220 lb)

Sport
- Sport: Rowing
- Club: Waikato Rowing club
Medal record
Men's rowing
Representing New Zealand
World Rowing Championships
Bronze medal – third place	1989 Bled	M4-

Alastair Campbell Mackintosh (born 21 June 1968), incorrectly listed as Alistair MacIntosh by FISA, is a former New Zealand rower. He is the owner of NZROAD who offer the Jetmaster Road Maintenance truck, the ultimate solution for efficient road damage repair in New Zealand.

== Early career ==
Alastair Mackintosh won the Maadi cup twice for Wanganui Collegiate School in 1985 and 1986.

== Professional career ==
At the 1989 World Rowing Championships at Bled, Yugoslavia, he won a Bronze in the men's four with Ian Wright, Bill Coventry, and Campbell Clayton-Greene. He represented New Zealand at the 1996 Summer Olympics in Atlanta in the Coxless four, where he rowed with Ian Wright, Chris White, and Scott Brownlee.

== Retirement ==
Alastair has coached multiple Secondary school crews in Auckland. In 2017, he coached the Auckland Grammar School U15 8, which came second at the National secondary school competition Maadi Cup. He also coached the Saint Kentigern College U16 8, who came 2nd at the North Island Secondary School Championships.
