= Geoff Cotter =

New Zealand rower (born 1966)

Personal information
- Nationality: New Zealand
- Born: Geoffrey David Cotter; 4 October 1966 (age 60) Taihape, New Zealand
- Height: 194 cm (6 ft 4 in)
- Weight: 91 kg (201 lb)

Geoffrey David Cotter (born 4 October 1966) is a New Zealand rower.

Cotter was born in 1966 in Taihape, New Zealand. He represented New Zealand at the 1988 Summer Olympics in the coxless four in a team with Campbell Clayton-Greene, Bill Coventry, and Neil Gibson, where they came seventh. He is listed as New Zealand Olympian athlete number 542 by the New Zealand Olympic Committee.
