= David Krmpotich =

American rower

Personal information
- Full name: David Matthew Krmpotich
- Born: April 20, 1955 (age 71) Duluth, Minnesota, U.S.
Medal record
Men's rowing
Representing United States
Olympic Games
Silver medal – second place	1988 Seoul	Coxless four
World Rowing Championships
Bronze medal – third place	1986 Nottingham	Eight

David Matthew Krmpotich (born April 20, 1955) is an American rower. He won a silver medal at the 1988 Olympic Games in the men's coxless fours, along with Thomas Bohrer, Richard Kennelly, and Raoul Rodriguez.

He was born in Duluth, Minnesota. As of 2026, he has been coaching boys crew for Monsignor Bonner High School in Upper Darby, Pennsylvania.
