= Massimo Di Deco =

Italian rower

Sport
- Sport: Rowing
Medal record
Men's rowing
Representing Italy
World Rowing Championships
Gold medal – first place	1985 Hazewinkel	Lwt eight
Gold medal – first place	1986 Nottingham	Lwt eight
Silver medal – second place	1984 Montreal	Lwt eight

Massimo Di Deco is an Italian coxswain. He won the gold medal at the 1985 World Rowing Championships in Hazewinkel with the lightweight men's eight.
