= Enrique Briones =

Spanish rower

Personal information
- Born: Enrique Briones Pérez; 4 September 1962 (age 63)

Sport
- Sport: Rowing
Medal record
Men's rowing
Representing Spain
World Rowing Championships
Gold medal – first place	1983 Duisburg	Lwt eight
Silver medal – second place	1982 Lucerne	Lwt four
Bronze medal – third place	1984 Montreal	Lwt eight

Enrique Briones Pérez (born 4 September 1962) is a Spanish lightweight rower. He won a gold medal at the 1983 World Rowing Championships in Duisburg with the lightweight men's eight. He also competed in the men's coxless four event at the 1988 Summer Olympics.
