= Marcos Arantes =

Brazilian rower

Personal information
- Nationality: Brazilian
- Born: 25 July 1964 (age 60)

Sport
- Sport: Rowing

Marcos Arantes (born 25 July 1964) is a Brazilian rower. He competed in the men's coxless four event at the 1988 Summer Olympics.
