= Spyridon Gatos =

Greek rower (born 1969)

Personal information
- Nationality: Greek
- Born: 21 January 1969 (age 56)

Sport
- Sport: Rowing

Spyridon Gatos (born 21 January 1969) is a Greek rower. He competed in the men's coxless four event at the 1988 Summer Olympics.
