= Luis María Moreno =

Spanish rower

Luis María Moreno Perpiñá
Sport
- Sport: Rowing
Medal record
Men's rowing
Representing Spain
World Rowing Championships
Gold medal – first place	1983 Duisburg	Lwt men's four
Gold medal – first place	1984 Montreal	Lwt men's four
Silver medal – second place	1982 Lucerne	Lwt men's four

Luis María Moreno Perpiñá is a Spanish lightweight rower. He won a gold medal at the 1983 World Rowing Championships in Duisburg with the lightweight men's four.
