= Gu Jiahong =

Chinese rower (born 1961)

Personal information
- Nationality: Chinese
- Born: 23 September 1961 (age 63)

Sport
- Sport: Rowing

Gu Jiahong (born 23 September 1961) is a Chinese rower. He competed in the men's coxless four event at the 1984 Summer Olympics.
