= Laura MacGinitie =

American rower

Sport
- Sport: Rowing
Medal record
Women's rowing
Representing United States
World Rowing Championships
Gold medal – first place	1984 Montreal	Eight

Laura MacGinitie is a retired American lightweight rower. She rowed for the Massachusetts Institute of Technology in 1980. She won a gold medal at the 1984 World Rowing Championships in Montreal, Canada, with the lightweight women's eight; this was the only year that this boat class competed at World Rowing Championships.
