= John Ossowski =

Canadian rower

Personal information
- Born: 10 February 1962 (age 63); Etobicoke, Ontario, Canada

Sport
- Sport: Rowing

John Ossowski (born 10 February 1962) is a Canadian rower. He competed in the men's coxless four event at the 1988 Summer Olympics.
