= John Quigley (rower) =

Australian rower

Personal information
- Nationality: Australian

Sport
- Country: Australia
- Sport: Rowing
- Club: Adelaide Rowing Club
Medal record
Men's rowing
Representing Australia
World Rowing Championships
Bronze medal – third place	1983 Duisburg	M8+

John Quigley is an Australian former rower. He was a four-time Australian national champion and stroked the Australian men's eight to a bronze medal at the 1983 World Rowing Championships.

== Club and state rowing ==
Raised in Adelaide, Quigley's senior rowing was from the Adelaide Rowing Club.

State representation first came for Quigley in 1977 in the South Australian youth eight contesting the Noel Wilkinson Trophy at the Interstate Regatta within the Australian Rowing Championships. He rowed again the South Australian youth eight in 1978 at stroke.

In 1982 and 1983 Quigley rowed in South Australian men's senior eights which contested and won the King's Cup at the Interstate Regatta. He rowed in another South Australian King's Cup eight in 1984.

In Adelaide RC colours he contested national titles at the Australian Rowing Championships. He competed for the coxed four national championship on three successive occasions from 1982 to 1984 and won that title in 1982 and 1983.

== International representative rowing ==
In 1983 Quigley was selected to stroke the Australian eight selected within a limited squad sent to the 1983 World Rowing Championships in Duisburg Germany. The eight performed well in lead up regattas at Vichy, Ratzeburg and Nottingham. In the final at the World Championships the Australian crew drew a bad lane and lost the benefit of the tail breeze; however, they raced a strong second 1000m and finished in third place for a bronze medal.
