= David Clark (rower) =

United States rower

Personal information
- Full name: David Robert Clark
- Born: November 17, 1959 (age 66) St. Louis, Missouri, U.S.
Medal record
Men's rowing
Representing the United States
Olympic Games
Silver medal – second place	1984 Los Angeles	Coxless four
World Championships
Bronze medal – third place	1981 Munich	Men's eights

David Robert Clark (born November 17, 1959) is a United States rower. He was born in St. Louis, Missouri and lives in Longmont, Colorado. Clark was the stroke on the U.S. national crew which finished third in the World Rowing Championships in Munich, Germany in 1981. He also rowed on the four-oared crew that finished 7th in the World Rowing Championships in New Zealand 1983. Clark earned a silver medal with the U.S. team in the men's coxless four at the 1984 Summer Olympics with Jonathan Smith, Philip Stekl, and Alan Forney. Their time of 6:06.10 was less than three seconds behind the victorious New Zealand team of Shane O'Brien, Les O'Connell, Conrad Robertson, and Keith Trask, which finished at 6:03.48.

== Education ==
Clark graduated from Cornell University in 1982, and was inducted into the Athletic Hall of Fame in 1990. In the no. 6 seat with the Cornell heavyweight crew team, Clark won the Intercollegiate Rowing Association title in 1981 and 1982 and competed in the Henley Royal Regatta.

== Associations ==
Clark joined the Phi Kappa Psi fraternity at Cornell, and through that organization, the Irving Literary Society. He was also president of Eta Kappa Nu and a member of Tau Beta Pi and Alpha Lambda Delta. He was also a member of the Quill and Dagger society.

== See also ==
- World Fit
