= Yun Yong-ho =

South Korean rower

Personal information
- Nationality: South Korean
- Born: 10 July 1965 (age 60)
- Education: Pukyong National University

Sport
- Sport: Rowing

Korean name
- Hangul: 윤용호
- Hanja: 尹龍浩
- RR: Yun Yongho
- MR: Yun Yongho

Yun Yong-ho (born 10 July 1965) is a South Korean rower. He competed in the men's coxless four event at the 1988 Summer Olympics.
