= Johann Schwarz (disambiguation) =

Johann Schwarz was an Austrian footballer.

Johann Schwarz may also refer to:

- Johann Schwarz (footballer, born 1891) (1891–1914)
- Johann Georg Schwarz (1751–1784), Russian academic and freemason
- Johann Gottlieb Schwarz (1800–1859), German Protestant missionary
