= Vasilios Lykomitros =

Greek rower (born 1962)

Personal information
- Nationality: Greek
- Born: 15 June 1962 (age 62)

Sport
- Sport: Rowing

Vasilios Lykomitros (born 15 June 1962) is a Greek rower. He competed in the men's coxless four event at the 1988 Summer Olympics.
