= Pascal Bahuaud =

French rower

Personal information
- Nationality: French
- Born: 15 June 1956 (age 68)

Sport
- Sport: Rowing

Pascal Bahuaud (born 15 June 1956) is a French rower. He competed in the men's coxless four event at the 1988 Summer Olympics.
