= Martin Knight (rower) =

British rower

Personal information
- Nationality: British
- Born: 17 October 1957 (age 67); London, England

Sport
- Sport: Rowing

Martin Knight (born 17 October 1957) is a British rower. He competed in the men's coxless four event at the 1984 Summer Olympics.
