= Peter Mulkerrins =

British rower

Personal information
- Nationality: British
- Born: 5 September 1964 (age 60); Bedford, England

Sport
- Sport: Rowing

Peter Mulkerrins (born 5 September 1964) is a British rower. He competed at the 1988 Summer Olympics and the 1992 Summer Olympics.
