= Keith Trask =

New Zealand rower

Personal information
- Born: Keith Charles Trask; 27 November 1960 (age 65) Hastings, New Zealand
- Occupation: carpenter
- Height: 190 cm (6 ft 3 in)
- Weight: 95 kg (209 lb)

Sport
- Sport: Rowing
- Club: North Shore Rowing Club
Medal record
Men's rowing
Representing New Zealand
Olympic Games
Gold medal – first place	1984 Los Angeles	Coxless four
World Championships
Gold medal – first place	1983 Duisburg	Coxed four

Keith Charles Trask (born 27 November 1960) is a former New Zealand rower who won an Olympic gold medal at the 1984 Summer Olympics in Los Angeles.

== Early life ==
Trask was born in 1960 in Hastings, New Zealand. Trask has a twin brother Paul. Their parents are Charles (died 2015) and Maureen Trask. They received their education in Hastings; first at Mayfair School and then at Hastings Intermediate.

== Rowing career ==
Trask was selected to compete at the 1980 Summer Olympics in Moscow with the coxed four but did not compete due to the Olympics boycott. He believes that he missed out being selected for the New Zealand eight in 1982 despite being "good enough to be there"; the team went on to win gold at the 1982 World Rowing Championships at Rotsee in Switzerland without him. In 1983, he moved from the Hawke's Bay to Auckland so that he could join the North Shore Rowing Club to increase his chances to get picked for a national team.

In 1983 the crew of Conrad Robertson, Greg Johnston, Keith Trask, Les O'Connell, and Brett Hollister (cox) won the coxed four in Duisburg at the World Championships. Along with Les O'Connell, Shane O'Brien and Conrad Robertson he won gold in the coxless four at the 1984 Olympics at Lake Casitas in California. In 1986, Trask teamed with Eric Verdonk for the pairs and became New Zealand national champion.

He later was a rowing coach for the North Shore Rowing Club, and currently coaches at Westlake Boys High School.

== Family and later activities ==
Trask is married to Serena, and they have three children (one son and two daughters) born between 1984 and 1987. They live in Auckland, where Trask works as a carpenter. He became self employed in 1999 when he founded his company, Keith Trask Limited. In 2009, he competed in ocean swimming.
