= Paul Schwarz =

German Iranologist (1867–1938)

Paul Schwarz (19 November 1867, in Neisse – 28 December 1938, in Torgau) was a German orientalist, Iranist and Arabist.

Letter from Schwarz (1924)

In 1893 he received his doctorate at the University of Leipzig with a dissertation titled Umar Ibn Abî Rebî'a. Ein arabischer Dichter der Umajjadenzeit. In 1896 he obtained his habilitation for Oriental languages, and from 1903 to 1937 was an unscheduled professor of Oriental languages at Leipzig.

== Literary works ==
- Umar Ibn Abî Rebîa'a, Ein Arabischer Dichter Der Umajjadenzeit, Leipzig, 1893. (archive.org)
- Iran im Muttelalter nach den arabischen Geographen, 7 vols., Leipzig: E. Pfeiffer, 1896–1926 – Iran in the Middle Ages according to the Arab geographers.
- Die ‘Abbāsiden Residenz Sāmarrā, 1909 – the Abbasid Residency Samarra.
- Escorial-Studien zur arabischen Literatur und Sprachkunde, 1922 – Escorial studies of Arabic literature and linguistics.
