= Olivier Pons =

French rower

Personal information
- Nationality: French
- Born: 18 July 1958 (age 66)

Sport
- Sport: Rowing

Olivier Pons (born 18 July 1958) is a French rower. He competed at the 1984 Summer Olympics and the 1988 Summer Olympics.
