= Pasquale Marigliano =

Italian rower

Personal information
- Born: 7 March 1965 (age 61)

Sport
- Sport: Rowing
Medal record
Men's rowing
Representing Italy
World Championships
Gold medal – first place	1991 Vienna	Lwt eight
Gold medal – first place	1995 Tampere	Lwt coxless pair
Silver medal – second place	1984 Montreal	Lwt eight
Silver medal – second place	1985 Hazewinkel	Eight
Bronze medal – third place	1993 Račice	Lwt eight
Bronze medal – third place	1994 Indianapolis	Lwt eight

Pasquale Marigliano (born 7 March 1965) is an Italian lightweight rower. He won a gold medal at the 1995 World Rowing Championships in Tampere with the lightweight men's coxless pair.
