= Rudolf Schwarz =

Rudolf Schwarz may refer to:

- Rudolf Schwarz (sculptor) (1846–1912), Austrian-born American sculptor
- Rudolf Schwarz (architect) (1897–1961), German architect
- Rudolf Schwarz (resistance activist) (1904–1934), German communist activist killed by the Gestapo
- Rudolf Schwarz (conductor) (1905–1994), Austrian-born British conductor
- Rudolf Schwarz (footballer) (1881–?), Swiss footballer
