= Volker Grabow =

German rower (born 1956)

Medal record

Men's rowing

Representing West Germany

Olympic Games
Bronze medal – third place	1988 Seoul	Coxless four

World Rowing Championships
Gold medal – first place	1983 Duisburg	Coxless four
Gold medal – first place	1985 Hazewinkel	Coxless four
Silver medal – second place	1986 Nottingham	Coxless four

Volker Grabow (born 27 September 1956 in Essen) is a German rower. Together with his brother Guido he was a top rower in the coxless four.
