= Norbert Keßlau =

West German rower (born 1962)

Medal record

Men's rowing

Representing West Germany

Olympic Games
Bronze medal – third place	1988 Seoul	Coxless four

World Rowing Championships
Gold medal – first place	1983 Duisburg	M4-
Gold medal – first place	1985 Hazewinkel	M4-
Gold medal – first place	1989 Bled	M8+
Silver medal – second place	1986 Nottingham	M4-

Norbert Keßlau (born 13 July 1962 in Dortmund) is a German rower.
