= Carin Reynolds =

American rower

Sport
- Sport: Rowing
Medal record
Women's rowing
Representing United States
World Rowing Championships
| Gold medal – first place | 1984 Montreal | Eight |

Carin Reynolds is a retired American lightweight rower. She won a gold medal at the 1984 World Rowing Championships in Montreal, Canada, with the lightweight women's eight; this was the only year that this boat class competed at World Rowing Championships.
