= Ralph Schwarz =

Dutch rower

Personal information
- Nationality: Dutch
- Born: 28 March 1967; Nieuwkoop, Netherlands
- Died: 17 September 1992 (aged 25); United States

Sport
- Sport: Rowing

Ralph Schwarz (28 March 1967 – 17 September 1992) was a Dutch rower. He competed in the men's coxless four event at the 1988 Summer Olympics. Schwarz died in a plane crash in 1992. He was Sven Schwarz's brother and Bram Schwarz's uncle.
