= Silas Schwarz =

German footballer (born 1997)

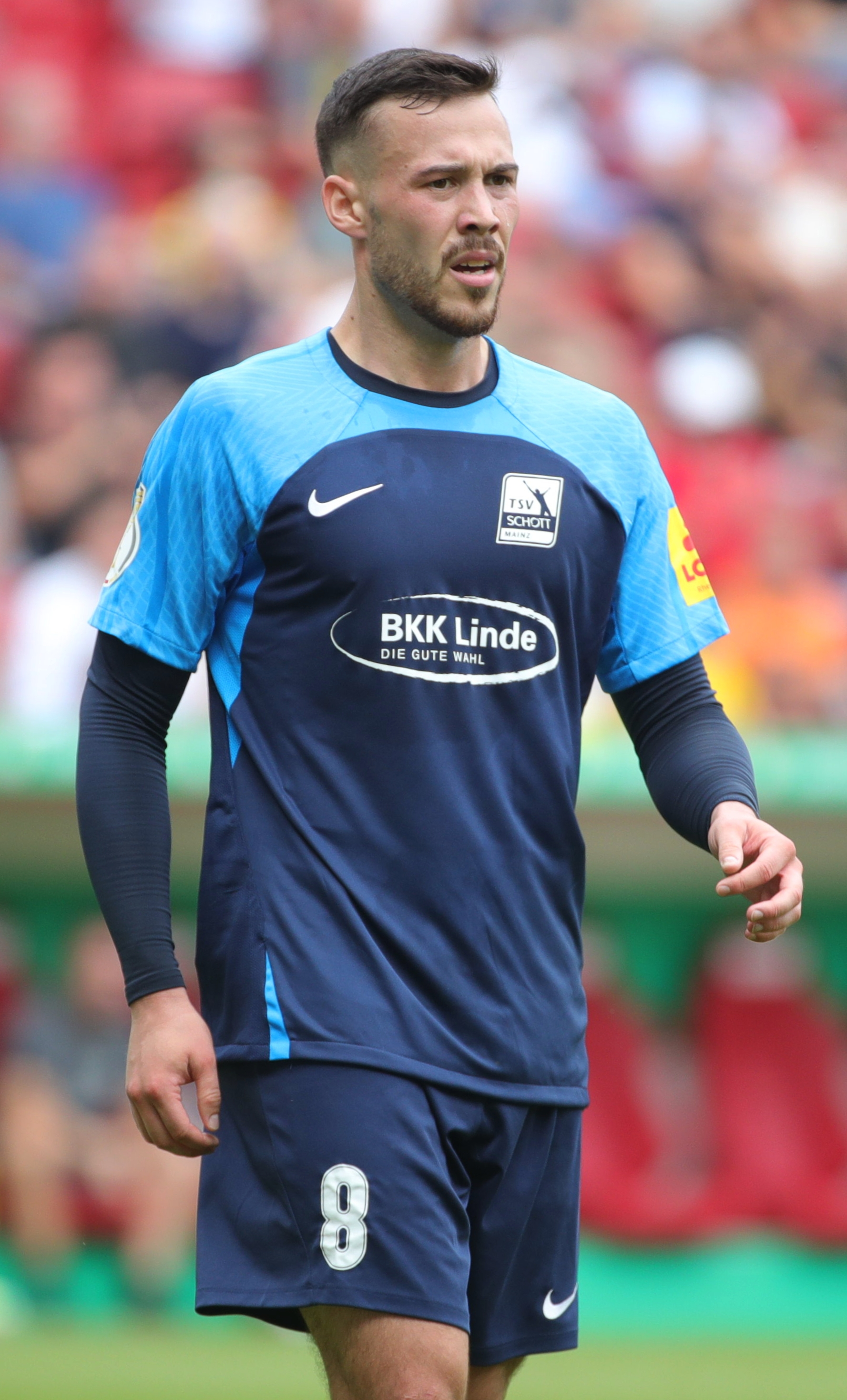
- Schwarz with TSV Schott Mainz in 2023

Personal information
- Full name: Silas Schwarz
- Date of birth: 8 November 1997 (age 28)
- Place of birth: Germany
- Height: 1.79 m (5 ft 10 in)
- Position: Midfielder

Team information
- Current team: TSV Schott Mainz
- Number: 17

Youth career
- 2004–2016: TSV Schott Mainz

Senior career*
Years	Team	Apps	(Gls)
2015–2018	TSV Schott Mainz II	28	(8)
2016–2019	TSV Schott Mainz	66	(11)
2019–2020	Waldhof Mannheim	7	(0)
2019–2020	Waldhof Mannheim II	12	(0)
2020–	TSV Schott Mainz	2	(1)
- * Club domestic league appearances and goals as of 13:25, 16 September 2020 (UTC)

Silas Schwarz (born 8 November 1997) is a German professional footballer who plays as a midfielder for TSV Schott Mainz.

== Career ==
Schwarz made his debut in the 3. Liga for Waldhof Mannheim on 21 July 2019, coming on as a substitute in the 87th minute for Valmir Sulejmani in the 1–1 home draw against Chemnitzer FC.
