= Johann Schwarz (footballer, born 1891) =

Austrian footballer (1891–1914)

Personal information
- Date of birth: 1891
- Date of death: 1914 (aged 22–23)
- Position: Forward

International career
Years	Team	Apps	(Gls)
1911–1913	Austria	3	(1)

Johann Schwarz (1891–1914) was an Austrian footballer who played as a forward. He made three appearances for the Austria national team from 1911 to 1913.
