= 1984 World Rowing Championships =

International rowing event

- Venue: Notre Dame Island
- Location: Montreal, Quebec, Canada
- Dates: 26 August

The 1984 World Rowing Championships were World Rowing Championships that were held on 26 August 1984 in Montreal, Quebec, Canada. Since 1984 was an Olympic year for rowing, the World Championships did not include Olympic events scheduled for the 1984 Summer Olympics.

== Medal summary ==
Medalists at the 1984 World Rowing Championships were:

=== Men's lightweight events ===
Event:	Gold:	Time	Silver:	Time	Bronze:	Time
LM1x	Denmark; Bjarne Eltang	7:02.20	United States; Paul Fuchs	7:03.55	Spain; Ángel Viana	7:07.37
LM2x	Italy; Francesco Esposito; Ruggero Verroca	6:25.14	West Germany; Hartmut Schäfer; Roland Ehrenfels	6:29.67	Denmark; Morten Espersen; Leif Kruse	6:31.27
LM4-	Spain; Fernando Molina; José María de Marco Pérez; Luis María Moreno; Alberto Molina	6:09.39	West Germany; Wolfgang Birkner; Thomas Jaekel; Frank Rogall; Ansgar Wessling	6:09.73	Great Britain; Christopher Bates; Carl Smith; Ian Wilson; Stuart Forbes	6:11.46
LM8+	Denmark; Ivar Mølgaard; Leif Jacobsen; Arne Højlund; Søren Hansson; Jan Christensen; Flemming Jensen; Mikael Espersen; Karsten Kobbernagel; Jan Rasmussen (cox)	5:43.35	Italy; Fabrizio Ravasi; Michele Savoia; Vittorio Torcellan; Salvatore Orlando; Stefano Spremberg; Paolo Marostica; Andrea Re; Pasquale Marigliano; Massimo Di Deco (cox)	5:46.50	Spain; Benito Elizalde; Eulogio Génova; Carlos Muniesa; Jacinto Accensi Abella; Enrique Briones; José Crespo; José Manuel Cañete; Víctor Llorente; Alejandro Moya (cox)	5:46.90

=== Women's lightweight events ===
Event:	Gold:	Time	Silver:	Time	Bronze:	Time
LW1x	West Germany; Alrun Urbach	8:22.85	United States; Barbara Trafton	8:25.05	United States; Ann Martin	8:30.90
LW2x	Denmark; Elisabeth Fraas; Kirsten Jensen-Plum	7:38.16	United States; Jo Hannafin; Annette Ebsen-Petersen	7:43.84	Canada; Audrey Mowchenko; Ellen Gillies	7:46.15
LW4-	West Germany; Beatriz Keller; Evelyn Herwegh; Regina Mayer; Claudia Engels	7:23.89	United States; Cecily Croft; Margaret Gordon; Linda Gillett; Elaine Stanley	7:29.14	United States; Gigi Hodges; Sandy Kendall; Drister Fowks; Carey Sands-Marden	7:29.16
LW8+	United States; Carin Reynolds; Mary-Ellen Finney; Jo Grainger; Laura MacGinitie; Mandy Kowal; Angela Herron; Marise Widmer; Jennifer Marron; Stacy Apfelbaum (cox)	6:10.00	Australia; Karin Riedel; Amanda Cross; Janet Sheahan; Jeanette Hall; Angela Maidment; Brigid Cassells; Debbie Cooper; Gayle Toogood; Megan Robertson (cox)	6:13.46	Canada; Diana Sinnige; Wendy Wiebe; Lynne Mutrie; Brenda Colby; Karen Smyte; Wendy Davis; Helen Orr; Maureen Cureton; Sandy Hopkinson (cox)	6:15.65
