= Bram Schwarz =

Dutch rower (born 1998)

Personal information
- Nationality: Dutch
- Born: 28 April 1998 (age 28)

Sport
- Country: Netherlands
- Sport: Rowing
- Event: Eight

Achievements and titles
- Olympic finals: Tokyo 2020 M8+
Medal record
World Championships
Silver medal – second place	2019 Ottensheim	Eight

Bram Schwarz (born 28 April 1998) is a Dutch rower. He is the son of Sven Schwarz. His uncle was Ralph Schwarz.

He is an Olympic finalist and won a medal at the 2019 World Rowing Championships.
