= Tim Turner (Canadian rower) =

Canadian rower

Personal information
- Born: 5 June 1959 (age 65); Toronto, Ontario, Canada

Sport
- Sport: Rowing

Tim Turner (born 5 June 1959) is a Canadian rower. He competed in the men's coxless four event at the 1984 Summer Olympics.
