= Jörg Puttlitz =

German rower (born 1962)

Medal record

Men's rowing

Representing West Germany

Olympic Games
| Bronze medal – third place | 1988 Seoul | Coxless four |

World Rowing Championships
| Gold medal – first place | 1983 Duisburg | M4- |
| Gold medal – first place | 1985 Hazewinkel | M4- |
| Gold medal – first place | 1989 Bled | M8+ |
| Silver medal – second place | 1986 Nottingham | M4- |

Jörg Puttlitz (born 25 August 1962) is a German rower. He was born in Hagen.
