= Roland Schröder =

East German rower

Personal information
- Born: 17 August 1962 (age 63) Köthen

Sport
- Sport: Rowing
Medal record
Men's rowing
Representing East Germany
Olympic Games
Gold medal – first place	1988 Seoul	Coxless four
World Rowing Championships
Silver medal – second place	1989 Bled	Eight
Bronze medal – third place	1990 Tasmania	Eight

Roland Schröder (born 17 August 1962 in Köthen) is a retired German rower who won a gold medal at the 1988 Summer Olympics in Seoul. He also won medals at World Rowing Championships in 1989 and 1990.
