= Katharina A. Schwarz =

German experimental psychologist and professor

Katharina A. Schwarz (*born 1985 in Würzburg) is a German experimental psychologist and professor of social psychology at the University of Luxembourg.

She studied biology at the Julius Maximilian University of Würzburg and then pursued a doctorate in Systems Neuroscience at the University Medical Center Hamburg-Eppendorf from 2011 to 2015. From 2015 to 2024 she worked as a research associate and project leader at the Department of Psychology at the University of Würzburg. Research stays included visits to the Massachusetts Institute of Technology and the University of Canterbury in Christchurch. In 2024 she joined the Department of Psychology at Trier University, and in November 2025 she was appointed professor of social psychology (Associate Professor of Social Psychology) at the University of Luxembourg.

Her research focuses on action in social contexts, perceived control, decision-making, sustainable behavior, and expectations. She is a partner in the EU-HORIZON project BUTTERFLY and a long-standing advocate of the open science movement.

== Awards ==
- 2018: Preregistration prize awarded by the Center for Open Science
- 2020: Karl Marbe Prize of the Institute of Psychology at the University of Würzburg
- 2022: ZONTA Science Award 2022 of the Zonta Club Würzburg

== Publications ==
- Schwarz, K. A., Pfister, R. & Büchel, C. (2016). Rethinking Explicit Expectations: Connecting Placebos, Social Cognition, and Contextual Perception. Trends in Cognitive Sciences, 20(6), 469–480.
- Schwarz, K. A., Pfister, R., Kluge, M., Weller, L., & Kunde, W. (2018). Do we see it or not? Sensory attenuation in the visual domain. Journal of Experimental Psychology: General, 147(3), 418-430.
- Pfister, R.*, Tonn, S.*, Weller, L., Kunde, W., & Schwarz, K. A. (2021). To prevent means to know: Explicit but no implicit agency for prevention behavior. Cognition, 206, 104489. (* equal author contribution)
- Schwarz, K. A., Klaffehn, A. L., Hauke-Forman, N., Muth, F. V., & Pfister, R. (2022). Never run a changing system: Action-effect contingency shapes prospective agency. Cognition, 229, 105250.
- Schwarz, K. A., Tonn, S., Büttner, J., Kunde, W., & Pfister, R. (2023). Sense of agency in social hierarchies. Journal of Experimental Psychology: General, 152(10), 2957-2976.
- Schwarz, K. A. (2025). Perceived control and the pleasantness of choosing: How much choice is too much choice? Current Research in Behavioral Sciences, 8, 100174.
