= Barbara Schwarz =

- Born: Barbara Bretschneider; 1955 (age 70–71); Deggendorf, Bavaria, Germany
- Organization: Church of Scientology (former)
- Known for: pro se FOIA petitioner

Notes
- Barbara Schwarz denies her German birth and family. According to statements from her various requests, she maintains the facts surrounding her birth are different. This is a part of her reason for submitting FOIA requests.

Barbara Schwarz is a German national, formerly residing in the United States, known as one of the largest single filers of Freedom of Information Act requests since the filing procedure became available in 1966. Since 1989, she has issued thousands of FOIA requests to, and has filed dozens of lawsuits with, numerous federal and state governmental departments and agencies, naming up to 3,087 defendants at a time. In addition to lawsuits filed against the National Security Agency (NSA), and the Central Intelligence Agency (CIA), Schwarz has filed suits against the Internal Revenue Service (IRS), and the United States Department of the Treasury. To date, she has not prevailed in any of these lawsuits.

Schwarz, a former member of the Church of Scientology, undertook her campaign to find information on various people she believes are related to her, including past Church of Scientology official Mark Rathbun whom she identifies as her husband, Scientology founder L. Ron Hubbard who she asserts was her father, and former United States president Dwight D. Eisenhower, who she says was her grandfather.

== Biographical background and claims ==
While a member of the Church of Scientology in Germany, she was subjected to an attempted involuntary deprogramming by former Scientologist Cyril Vosper in 1987. A German court later convicted Vosper of kidnapping and causing bodily harm during this incident. According to Schwarz, she moved to the United States from Germany in 1989 and settled in Salt Lake City, Utah; she indicated on her blog that she repatriated to Germany in late 2025. In 2004, Schwarz posted her story, which the Salt Lake Tribune says "reads like a science fiction novel", to the Usenet newsgroup alt.religion.scientology.

Her memories and subsequent requests are based on the stated belief that she is the daughter of Scientology founder L. Ron Hubbard, born in a submarine village under the Great Salt Lake in Utah, and was kidnapped from it and taken to Germany as part of a Nazi conspiracy. She also says that she believes that L. Ron Hubbard is the son of President Dwight Eisenhower and that the Federal government is concealing the whereabouts of former Church official Mark Rathbun, whom she says is her husband, and that he was falsely imprisoned for her own murder. When shown a recent photo of Rathbun provided by the Church of Scientology, she said that it was not the same man.

== FOIA requests and government litigation ==
Schwarz's FOIA campaign, which has been compared to carpet bombing for its scale and indiscriminate nature, focuses mainly on requests for information about herself, Mark Rathbun, President Dwight Eisenhower, L. Ron Hubbard, and the Church of Scientology.

Her requests prompted U.S. District Court Judge John Bates to say FOIA's "admirable purpose is abused when misguided individuals are allowed (in this case repeatedly) to submit requests to every agency and subdivision of the government, seeking information about an imaginary conspiracy," when he wrote a September ruling against Schwarz in Washington.

William Ferroggiaro, director of the Freedom of Information Project of the National Security Archive at George Washington University and president of the American Society of Access Professionals, said about her: "Who's to say that one person's request has more validity than anyone else's? It's value neutral. In a way, she is using the law as it is intended even if her efforts cannot be characterized as anything but bizarre." Daniel Metcalfe, in 2003 the co-director of the Justice Department's Office of Information and Privacy, said that responding to Schwarz's petitions had caused federal and state government agencies to cooperate in ways they had not before in response to her many outstanding debts with these agencies. "In the case of any FOIA requester who defaults or reneges on a commitment to pay, whether he or she has made two requests or 2,000, there would be a basis for the request not to be acted upon until the default is corrected," Metcalfe said.

=== Litigation ===
When the responses to Schwarz's FOIA requests failed to verify her claims, she responded with litigation, in which she has consistently acted in pro per (as her own representative). Michael O'Brien, an attorney for the Salt Lake Tribune, said about her, "She did a very good job representing herself, better than some lawyers." According to the Salt Lake Tribune, "at least one of Schwarz's lawsuits has been considered by a U.S. District or U.S. Circuit Court of Appeals somewhere in the nation every year since 1993." A 2005 article in the Asbury Park Press referred to Schwarz as "notorious for her nationwide quest for documents...." The same article quoted the New Jersey Government Records Council chairman as suggesting that: "lawmakers should consider amending the law to keep libraries from being forced to undertake private research projects, like Schwarz's."

In 1997, a Schwarz lawsuit against President Bill Clinton reached the United States Supreme Court. U.S. federal agencies named as defendants in other litigation by Schwarz include the Internal Revenue Service in 1998, the Central Intelligence Agency in 1999, a United States Supreme Court case against the National Security Agency in 1999, and the United States Department of the Treasury in 2000.

In the 2001 case Schwarz v. United States Dep't of Agriculture, Civil Action No. 01-1464, she named 3,087 defendants in a complaint totalling 2,370 pages. Most of her lawsuits have been dismissed outright as frivolous and she hasn't prevailed in any of them. Schwarz is unable to pay for detailed information requests due to poverty, which has formed the basis of government refusals to perform voluminous searches. As of 2005, the United States Department of Justice had authorized government employees to refuse to respond to any of Schwarz's FOIA requests until she pays outstanding fees. and "two U.S. Courts of Appeals ruled that her requests and lawsuits are frivolous." In 2004, The Oregonian reported that a federal court limited Schwarz's future FOIA requests to new subjects, "not to exceed 10 single-spaced pages."

In 2005, the Utah Court of Appeals ruled that The Salt Lake Tribune did not libel Schwarz in a 2003 article when it used the term "FOIA terrorist" and the phrase "Have you been Schwarzed today?" in reference to "her unending request letters." In an email interview with the First Amendment Center, Schwarz responded: "We all depend on the media to keep us up to date with events, but we need true and responsible reporting and not horrible insults such as calling somebody a 'FOIA terrorist'."

Judge Irving R. Kaufman wrote about Schwarz's suit against the Tribune: "What is newsworthy about such accusations is that they were made. We do not believe that the press may be required under the First Amendment to suppress newsworthy statements merely because it has serious doubts regarding their truth. The public interest in being fully informed about controversies that often rage around sensitive issues demands that the press be afforded the freedom to report such charges without assuming responsibility for them."

=== Supreme Court of the United States ===
After Schwarz filed 35 separate certiorari petitions to the Supreme Court of the United States, all of which were dismissed as frivolous, the Court issued a ruling on March 9, 1999, directing the Clerk of the Court "not to accept any further petitions for certiorari from Schwarz in noncriminal matters unless she pays the docketing fee required by Rule 38 ..." The ruling states, "Schwarz has repeatedly abused this Court's certiorari process." Justice Stevens dissented, without comment, but citing his own previous dissent in Martin v. District of Columbia Court of Appeals, a different case denying certiorari to another alleged vexatious litigant, in which he argued that "the theoretical administrative benefit the Court may derive from an order of this kind is far outweighed by the shadow it casts on the great tradition of open access..."

== Schwarz and the Church of Scientology ==
Schwarz joined in Germany and served as President of the Church of Scientology of Germany from August 3, 1983, until July 10, 1984. She still practices independently, saying that she was "kicked out" of the Church. In a 1994 attempt to locate Mark Rathbun, Schwarz sued the Church of Scientology to force the church to divulge his whereabouts to her. The judge granted the Church of Scientology's request to dismiss the case and ruled that "Ms. Schwarz had presented no legally cognizable claim against the Church that entitled her to relief in federal court". Linda Simmons Hight, a director of media relations for the Church of Scientology at the time, said about Schwarz, "We're clueless about this person and obviously she is delusional about Mr. Rathbun and she needs help. We're sorry for her". This case was eventually appealed to the United States Court of Appeals for the 10th Circuit where the court ruled that "the district court correctly dismissed the motions."
