= David Svensson (rower) =

Swedish rower

Personal information
- Nationality: Swedish
- Born: 14 January 1966 (age 59)

Sport
- Sport: Rowing

David Svensson (born 14 January 1966) is a Swedish rower. He competed at the 1988 Summer Olympics and the 1992 Summer Olympics.
