= José Luis Aguirre =

Spanish rower (born 1967)

Personal information
- Nationality: Spanish
- Born: 8 March 1967 (age 59) Orio, Spain

Sport
- Sport: Rowing
Medal record
Representing Spain
Mediterranean Games
Silver medal – second place	1991 Athens	Coxless fours

José Luis Aguirre Arruti (born 8 March 1967) is a Spanish rower. He competed in the men's coxless four event at the 1988 Summer Olympics.
