= Hans Schwarz =

Hans Schwarz may refer to:

- Hans Schwarz (sculptor) (1492–c. 1532), German medallist and sculptor
- Hans Schwarz (swimmer) (1912–1996), German swimmer
- Hanns Schwarz (1888–1945), Austrian film director
- Hans Schwarz (theologian) (born 1939), German Lutheran theologian
- Hans Schwartz (1913–1991), German footballer
- Hans Schwarz (artist) (1922–2003), Austrian artist
- Hans Schwarz (athlete) (1924–2010), Swiss Olympic hurdler
