= Megan Robertson (rowing) =

Australian rowing cox

Megan Roberston
Sport
- Country: Australia
- Sport: Rowing
- Club: Melbourne Uni Boat Club
Medal record
Women's rowing
Representing Australia
World Rowing Championships
| Silver medal – second place | 1984 Montreal | LW8+ |

Megan Robertson is an Australian former rowing coxswain. She was a dual national champion and won a silver medal at the 1984 World Rowing Championships.

== Club and state rowing ==
Robertson's senior club rowing was from the Melbourne University Boat Club.

In 1984 Robertson made her only state representative appearance for Victoria as coxswain of the state lightweight coxed four which contested and won the Victoria Cup at the 1984 Interstate Regatta within the Australian Rowing Championships.

In their club colours (as a composite MUBC/Banks Rowing Club four) that same crew won the Australian lightweight coxed four title at the 1984 Australian Rowing Championships with Robertson on the rudder.

== International representative rowing ==
Robertson made her sole Australian representative appearance at the 1984 World Rowing Championships in Montreal. She was in the stern of the Australian women's lightweight eight and steered them to a silver medal.
