= Christian Schwarz =

Christian Schwarz may refer to:

- Christian Friedrich Schwarz (1726 – 1798, often Schwartz), German missionary and linguist
- Christian Schwarz-Schilling (1930–2026), Austrian-born German politician and entrepreneur

== See also ==
- Christian Schwartz (born 1977), American typeface designer
