= Lars-Åke Lindqvist =

Swedish rower

Personal information
- Nationality: Swedish
- Born: 13 October 1959 (age 65)

Sport
- Sport: Rowing

Lars-Åke Lindqvist (born 13 October 1959) is a Swedish rower. He competed in the men's coxless four event at the 1984 Summer Olympics.
