= Jean-Jacques Martigne =

French rower

Personal information
- Nationality: French
- Born: 4 August 1960 (age 64)

Sport
- Sport: Rowing

Jean-Jacques Martigne (born 4 August 1960) is a French rower. He competed at the 1984 Summer Olympics and the 1988 Summer Olympics.
