= David Johnson (rower) =

Canadian rower

Personal information
- Full name: David Leslie Johnson
- Born: 22 May 1960 (age 64); Toronto, Ontario, Canada

Sport
- Sport: Rowing

David Leslie Johnson (born 22 May 1960) is a Canadian rower. He competed at the 1984 Summer Olympics and the 1988 Summer Olympics.
