= Daniel R. Schwarz =

American academic

Daniel R. Schwarz (born May 12, 1941) is Frederick J. Whiton Professor of English Literature and Stephen H. Weiss Presidential Fellow at Cornell University, where he has taught since 1968. He has directed nine NEH seminars and has lectured in the United States and abroad, including lecture tours under the auspices of the academic programs of the USIS and the State Department. He was a founding member of the Society for the Study of Narrative Literature and served as its president from 1990 to 1991. He has held three endowed visiting professorships (at the University of Arkansas, Little Rock, 1989; the University of Hawaii, 1992–93; and the University of Alabama, Huntsville, 1996). He was a guest Fellow for short periods at Oxford (Brasenose) and Cambridge (Girton) in the UK. He was the President of the Cornell Phi Beta Kappa chapter from 2009 to 2026. He is the author of twenty books and a number of articles.

In 1998, he received Cornell's College of Arts and Sciences Russell award for distinguished teaching. The Weiss title, awarded by the university in 1999, further honors his teaching.

His former graduate students and NEH participants put together a festschrift in his honor in 2012, titled Reading Texts, Reading Live: Essays in the Tradition of Humanistic Cultural Criticism in Honor of Daniel R. Schwarz (University of Delaware Press, 2012). In March 2018, Cornell celebrated his 50 years of teaching at the university with a conference in his honor.

He has blogged for Huffington on political and social issues and on higher education. His book, How to Succeed in College and Beyond (2016) developed in part from his Huffington and other articles.

== Contributions ==
=== Theory ===
Schwarz is a humanist and a pluralist; his literary criticism takes account of the theoretical revolution while avoiding the abstractions of much modern critical theory in favor of a consideration of both context and text. What he calls his "mantra" summarizes his efforts to balance formalism and historical criticism: "Always the text; always historicize." Historical criticism, for Schwarz, may include a psychoanalytic emphasis which takes into account the author's quest for meaning within a text. He explains his perspective in The Case for a Humanistic Poetics: "Since humanistic criticism assumes that texts are by human authors for human readers about human subjects, a humanistic criticism is interested in how and why people think, write, act, and ultimately live." Schwarz has called his approach "humanistic formalism." He focuses on the process of reading, specifically how the reader responds to the structure of effects created by the author and how readers learn from literary texts.

In the 1980s and 1990s, Schwarz was a figure in the theoretical debates, arguing in The Humanistic Heritage: Critical Theories of the English Novel from James to Hillis Miller (1986) that there was an important methodological and theoretical approach underpinning Anglo-American modern criticism and providing close readings of major critics to prove this point. In his The Case for a Humanistic Poetics (1989), he defined his own approach.

=== High Modernism ===
For decades, beginning with his two volume study of Conrad's complete works, Conrad: Almayer's Folly through Under Western Eyes (1980) and Conrad: Later Fiction (1982), Schwarz has been a figure in defining High Modernism and in reading major texts of that period. His Reading Joyce's Ulysses (1987; revised 2004) and his Narrative and Representation in Wallace Stevens (1993) are major contributions. His work on modernism includes articles on T.S. Eliot and Dylan Thomas. The Transformation of the English Novel, 1890-1930 (1989; revised 1995) and Reading the Modern British and Irish Novel, 1890-1930 (2005) discuss not only Conrad and Joyce, but also Hardy, Lawrence, Woolf, and Forster. Schwarz's editions of Joyce's "The Dead" and Conrad's "The Secret Sharer" are widely used in classes. Schwarz's Reconfiguring Modernism: Explorations in the Relationship Between Modern Art and Modern Literature (1997) made him a pivotal figure in developing the relationship between the literary and visual arts.

=== Holocaust and Jewish Studies ===
In Imagining the Holocaust (1999), a study of books and films about the Holocaust including books by Elie Wiesel, Anne Frank, and Art Spiegelman and films by Claude Lanzmann and Steven Spielberg, Schwarz focuses on the relationship among memory, imagination, and narrative. Schwarz's interest in Jewish studies began with his Disraeli's Fiction (1979) and continued with his discussion of Bloom in Reading Joyce's 'Ulysses' and his The Story in Fiction and Film of French Collaboration in the Occupation and Complicity in the Holocaust (1940-1944).

=== Cultural Studies ===
Schwarz has turned his attention to media culture and urban studies in Broadway Boogie Woogie: Damon Runyon and the Making of New York City Culture (2003) and in Endtimes? Crises and Turmoil at the New York Times: 1999-2009. He also edited Damon Runyon: Guys and Dolls and other Writings for Penguin Classics (2008).

=== Biography ===
Schwarz holds a B.A. from Union College (New York) and an M.A. and Ph.D. from Brown University. He has two sons, Cornell graduates, by his first marriage: David, the women's varsity tennis coach at Claremont Mudd Scripps Colleges, and Jeffrey, working in the mutual fund industry. His wife, Marcia Jacobson, is retired from Auburn University; she is the Hargis Professor of American Literature Emerita.

=== Books ===
- The Garden of My Saying (American Fork, Utah: Kelsay Books, 2025)
- The Story in Fiction and Film of French Collaboration in the Occupation and Complicity in the Holocaust (1940-2025) (Leiden/Boston: Brill, 2025)
- Reading the Modern European Novel from 1900 (Malden. MA; Oxford, UK: Wiley-Blackwell, 2018)
- How to Succeed in College and Beyond: The Art of Learning (Malden, MA; Oxford, UK: Wiley-Blackwell, 2016; trans. into Mandarin with new ch. for Asian students, Beijing: Renmin, 2018)
- Reading the European Novel to 1900 (Malden, MA; Oxford, UK: Wiley-Blackwell, 2014; paperback 2018)
- Endtimes? Crises and Turmoil at the New York Times: 1999-2009 (Albany, NY: SUNY Press, 2012; paperback edition with new Preface and new title, Endtimes? Crisis and Turmoil at the New York Times, 2014)
- In Defense of Reading: Teaching Literature in the Twenty-First Century (Malden, MA; Oxford, UK: Blackwell, 2008)
- Reading the Modern British and Irish Novel, 1890-1930 (Malden, MA; Oxford, UK: Wiley-Blackwell, 2005)
- Broadway Boogie Woogie: Damon Runyon and the Making of New York City Culture (New York: Palgrave Macmillan: New York and London, 2003)
- Rereading Conrad (Columbia, MO: University of Missouri Press, 2001)
- Imagining the Holocaust (New York: St. Martin's Press; London: Macmillan, 1999)
- Reconfiguring Modernism: Explorations in the Relationship Between Modern Art and Modern Literature (New York: St. Martin's Press; London: Macmillan, 1997)
- Narrative and Representation in Wallace Stevens (New York: St. Martin's Press; London: Macmillan, 1993) Chosen by Choice as an outstanding book of 1993.
- The Case for a Humanistic Poetics (Philadelphia: University of Pennsylvania Press; London: Macmillan, 1991)
- The Transformation of the English Novel, 1890-1930 (New York: St. Martin's Press; London: Macmillan, 1989; revised 1995)
- Reading Joyce's "Ulysses" (New York: St. Martin's Press; London: Macmillan, 1987; revised 1991, 2004)
- The Humanistic Heritage: Critical Theories of the English Novel from James to Hillis Miller (Philadelphia, PA: University of Philadelphia Press; London: Macmillan, 1986; revised 1989)
- Conrad: The Later Fiction (Atlantic Highlands, NJ: Humanities Press; London: Macmillan, 1982)
- Conrad: "Almayer's Folly" through "under Western Eyes" (Ithaca, NY: Cornell University Press; London: Macmillan, 1980)
- Disraeli's Fiction (New York: Barnes and Noble; London: Macmillan, 1979)

=== Editions ===
- Ed., Damon Runyon: Guys and Dolls and other Writings (New York: Penguin, 2008)
- General Ed., Reading the American and British Novel, 9 vols. (Malden, MA; Oxford, UK: Wiley-Blackwell, 3 vols. published; 6 vols. forthcoming)
- Consulting Ed., The Early Novels of Benjamin Disraeli, 6 vols. (London: Pickering and Chatto, LTD, 2004)
- Ed., Joseph Conrad, "The Secret Sharer" (Boston; New York: Bedford/St. Martins [Beford Case Studies in Contemporary Criticism], 1997)
- Ed., James Joyce, "The Dead" (Boston, New York: Bedford/St. Martins [Bedford Case Studies in Contemporary Criticism], 1994)
- Ed., with Janice Carlise, Narrative and Culture (Athens, GA: University of Georgia Press, 1994; reissued 2010)

=== Poetry and Travel Articles ===
Schwarz has published over 100 poems. A selection of his poems is collected in his book of Poetry The Garden of My Saying (2025). He has also published over 50 travel articles and a short story that has been anthologized.
