= Paolo Marostica =

Italian rower

Personal information
- Born: 1964 (age 61–62) Pavia, Italy

Sport
- Sport: Rowing
Medal record
Men's rowing
Representing Italy
World Rowing Championships
Gold medal – first place	1985 Hazewinkel	Lwt eight
Silver medal – second place	1984 Montreal	Lwt eight
Summer Universiade
Gold medal – first place	1987 Zagreb	Eight

Paolo Marostica (born 1964) is an Italian lightweight rower. He won a gold medal at the 1985 World Rowing Championships in Hazewinkel with the lightweight men's eight.
