= Sebastian Schwarz =

Sebastian Schwarz may refer to:

- Sebastian Schwarz (actor), German actor
- Sebastian Schwarz (volleyball) (born 1985), German volleyball player
- Sebastian F. Schwarz, German-born musician, teacher and administrator
