= Laurent Schwarz (artist) =

German child artist

Laurent Schwarz (born 2021–2022?) is a child artist from Bavaria, Germany, who in 2024 gained international attention for his abstract paintings, which have been sold for thousands of Euros.

He began painting in autumn 2023, aged approximately 1½, and produces on average one painting per week. His favorite themes are animals, such as horses and elephants, and he prefers to work with bright colors. The Times newspaper has called him "pint-sized Picasso". According to the same newspaper, the artist's parents have received a bid of EUR 270,000 for his first painting, titled The Fingers, but have declined to sell it for sentimental reasons.

Reportedly, a licensing deal has been struck to sell paint and wallpaper branded with Schwarz's name. Money raised from Schwarz's work is being held for him in a separate account until he turns 18.
