= Guido Grabow =

German rower (born 1959)

Medal record

Men's rowing

Representing West Germany

Olympic Games
Bronze medal – third place	1988 Seoul	Coxless four

World Rowing Championships
Gold medal – first place	1983 Duisburg	M4-
Gold medal – first place	1985 Hazewinkel	M4-
Silver medal – second place	1986 Nottingham	M4-

Guido Grabow (born 7 October 1959 in Opladen) is a German rower. Together with his brother Volker he was a top rower in the coxless four.
