= Hermann Schwarz (disambiguation) =

Hermann Schwarz (1843–1921), was a German mathematician.

Hermann Schwarz may also refer to:

- Hermann Schwarz (philosopher) (1864–1951), German philosopher
- Hermann Amandus Schwarz (1843–1921), German mathematician
