= Per-Olof Claesson =

Swedish rower

Personal information
- Nationality: Swedish
- Born: 23 January 1965 (age 60)

Sport
- Sport: Rowing

Per-Olof Claesson (born 23 January 1965) is a Swedish rower. He competed at the 1988 Summer Olympics and the 1992 Summer Olympics.
