= Shane O'Brien (rower) =

New Zealand rower

Personal information
- Born: Shane Joseph O'Brien; 27 September 1960 (age 66) Auckland, New Zealand
- Height: 203 cm (6 ft 8 in)
- Weight: 96 kg (212 lb)

Sport
- Sport: Rowing
- Club: West End Rowing Club
Medal record
Men's rowing
Representing New Zealand
Olympic Games
Gold medal – first place	1984 Los Angeles	Coxless four
Commonwealth Games
Silver medal – second place	1986 Edinburgh	Coxless four
Bronze medal – third place	1986 Edinburgh	Eight

Shane Joseph O'Brien (born 27 September 1960) is a former New Zealand rower who won an Olympic gold medal at the 1984 Summer Olympics in Los Angeles, California, USA.

== Early life ==
O'Brien was born in 1960 in Auckland, New Zealand. He received his secondary school education at Mount Albert Grammar School from 1974 to 1978, where he was prefect and captain of the rowing team.

== Rowing career ==
Along with Les O'Connell, Conrad Robertson and Keith Trask he won gold in the coxless four at the 1984 Los Angeles Olympics. O'Brien also competed at the 1986 Commonwealth Games in Edinburgh, Scotland, winning a silver medal in the coxless four and a bronze medal in the eights. At the 1985 World Rowing Championships at Hazewinkel in Belgium, he came fourth with the coxless four. He is listed as New Zealand Olympian number 482. His three medals were stolen in a burglary in 2006.

== Teaching career ==
O'Brien is a trained teacher. In the late 1980s, he went back to his old school to teach there. He also taught at an intermediate school in Auckland. He moved to England in the early 1990s where he worked as a teacher and coached rowing at Latymer Upper School, Hammersmith. He worked closely with the Latymer Upper School boatman at the time, Coyne T. Mullen. In 1999, he went on to Shiplake College, on the River Thames south of Henley-on-Thames; he was the deputy headmaster there. One of the Shiplake College rowers who had trained under him, Will Satch, went to win Olympic bronze at the 2012 Summer Olympics (coxless pair) and gold four years later (eight). Before he left Shiplake College, a new coxless four boat purchased by the school was named for O'Brien. He became headmaster of Jumeirah English Speaking School (Dubai, UAE) in mid-2011, and director in September 2019.
