= Sven Schwarz (rower) =

Dutch rower

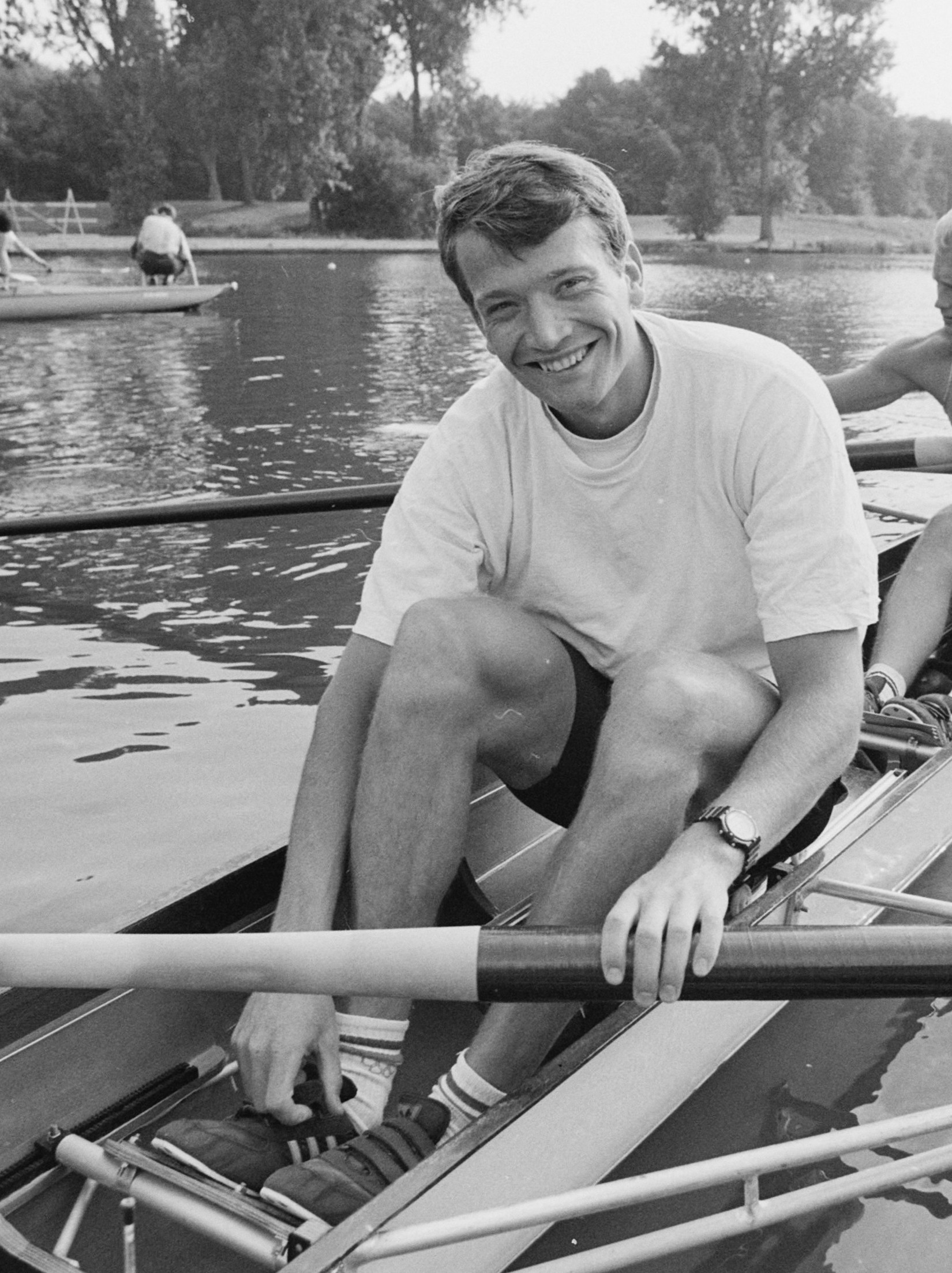
- Schwarz in 1992

Personal information
- Nationality: Dutch
- Born: 3 December 1964 (age 61) Haarlem, Netherlands

Sport
- Sport: Rowing

Sven Schwarz (born 3 December 1964) is a Dutch rower. He competed at the 1988 Summer Olympics and the 1992 Summer Olympics. He is Ralph Schwarz's brother and Bram Schwarz's father.
