= Jonathan Smith (rower) =

American rower

Personal information
- Full name: Jonathan Scott Smith
- Born: May 9, 1961 (age 65) Salem, Massachusetts, U.S.
Medal record
Men's rowing
Representing the United States
Olympic Games
Silver medal – second place	1984 Los Angeles	Coxless four
Bronze medal – third place	1988 Seoul	Men's eight

Jonathan Scott Smith (born May 9, 1961) is an American rower who competed in the 1984, 1988 and 1992 Summer Olympics. He was born in Salem, Massachusetts, and attended Phillips Exeter Academy.
