= Anders Larson =

Swedish rower

Personal information
- Full name: Kurt Anders Larson
- Nationality: Swedish
- Born: 14 February 1958 (age 67)

Sport
- Sport: Rowing

Kurt Anders Larson (born 14 February 1958) is a Swedish rower. He competed at the 1980 Summer Olympics, 1984 Summer Olympics and the 1988 Summer Olympics.
