= 1984 Olympics =

The 1984 Olympics may refer to:

- The 1984 Winter Olympics, which were held in Sarajevo, Yugoslavia
- The 1984 Summer Olympics, which were held in Los Angeles, California, United States
