= Rowing at the 1984 Summer Olympics – Men's double sculls =

Men's double sculls at the Games of the XXIII Olympiad
- Date: 30 July – 5 August 1984
- Competitors: 23 from 11 nations

Medalists
1st place, gold medalist(s)		Brad Alan Lewis; Paul Enquist	United States
2nd place, silver medalist(s)		Pierre-Marie Deloof; Dirk Crois	Belgium
3rd place, bronze medalist(s)		Zoran Pančić; Milorad Stanulov	Yugoslavia

The men's double sculls competition at the 1984 Summer Olympics took place at took place at Lake Casitas, California, United States of America.

== Competition format ==
The competition consisted of two main rounds (heats and finals) as well as a repechage. The 11 boats were divided into two heats for the first round, with 6 boats in one heat and 5 boats in the other. The winner of each heat advanced directly to the "A" final (1st through 6th place). The remaining 9 boats were placed in the repechage. The repechage featured two heats, with 5 boats in one heat and 4 boats in the other. The top two boats in each repechage heat went to the "A" final. The remaining 5 boats (3rd, 4th, and 5th placers in the repechage heats) competed in the "B" final for 7th through 11th place.

All races were over a 2000-metre course.

== Results ==
=== Heats ===
The heats were held on 30 July. It was a warm day (27 °C) with a very slight (.05 m/s) west-southwest wind. The winner of each heat advanced to the A final, with all others going to the repechage. No boats were eliminated in this round (a fact highlighted when Yugoslavia, the last-place finisher in the second heat, went on to earn the bronze medal).

==== Heat 1 ====
The first heat saw all six boats relatively closely packed through the first 500 metres. By the halfway mark, the West Germans had begun to establish a lead. For those first two quarter-marks, the Swiss were in second place. By the 1500 metre mark, however, Switzerland had fallen back to fifth (where they remained) while the Americans began to creep up on the leaders. The United States narrowed the gap somewhat, but the Germans still won comfortably, by 1.5 seconds. The Norwegians and Austrians had a close contest for third and fourth place. Mexico's strong start—third place at the quarter-mark—petered out into a last-place finish 5.5 seconds behind fifth-place Switzerland.

Rank	Rower	Nation	Time	Notes
1	Georg Agrikola; Andreas Schmelz	West Germany	6:36.70	QA
2	Paul Enquist; Brad Alan Lewis	United States	6:38.21	R
3	Alf Hansen; Rolf Thorsen	Norway	6:43.01	R
4	Wilfried Auerbach; Thomas Linemayr	Austria	6:43.10	R
5	Marc-Sven Nater; Daniel Winkler	Switzerland	6:51.48	R
6	Eduardo Arrillaga; Armando Chávez	Mexico	6:57.01	R

==== Heat 2 ====
The second heat was not competitive at the top, with well over 3 seconds between first and second, 4 seconds between second and third, and 2 seconds between third and fourth. The last two places came down to a close finish, though, with Canada edging out Yugoslavia by only 0.10 seconds. Belgium ran first the entire way, with Finland in second for the first half before being overtaken by the Italian team over the third 500-metre stretch.

Rank	Rower	Nation	Time	Notes
1	Dirk Crois; Pierre-Marie Deloof	Belgium	6:40.11	QA
2	Francesco Esposito; Ruggero Verroca	Italy	6:43.52	R
3	Reima Karppinen; Aarne Lindroos	Finland	6:47.74	R
4	Peter MacGowan; Tim Storm	Canada	6:49.88	R
5	Zoran Pančić Milorad Stanulov	Yugoslavia	6:49.98	R

=== Repechage ===
The repechage was held on 2 August. It was a cooler day (18 °C) with no wind. The winner and runner-up in each heat advanced to the "A" final, with all others going to the "B" final—out of medal contention.

==== Repechage heat 1 ====
The 2nd, 4th, and 6th place boats from the first heat joined the 3rd and 5th place boats from the second heat in this repechage. Yugoslavia, having taken last place in its preliminary heat, set out determined to avoid a similar fate in the repechage. They led the American pair by 0.15 seconds after 500 metres and by 0.19 seconds after 1000 metres. The other three boats were well enough back at that point that it would take a significant charge to alter the top two, who would advance; none was forthcoming. After 1500 metres, the Americans had passed Yugoslavia for a slight lead of 0.26 seconds. Yugoslavia fell further behind the leaders over the last 500 metres but were never seriously challenged for second place and a spot in the main final. Mexico, Finland, and Austria battled for placement, with Mexico dropping from third at 500 metres back to fifth at 1000 and 1500 metres before pulling back up to third at the end. Finland prevailed over Austria in a tight contest for fourth.

Rank	Rower	Nation	Time	Notes
1	Paul Enquist; Brad Alan Lewis	United States	6:38.32	QA
2	Zoran Pančić Milorad Stanulov	Yugoslavia	6:39.70	QA
3	Eduardo Arrillaga; Armando Chávez	Mexico	6:42.86	QB
4	Reima Karppinen; Aarne Lindroos	Finland	6:44.43	QB
5	Wilfried Auerbach; Thomas Linemayr	Austria	6:44.54	QB

==== Repechage heat 2 ====
The 2nd and 4th place boats from the second heat and the 3rd and 5th place boats from the first heat contested this repechage heat (with Switzerland swapping Winkler out and Steinemann in). It became obvious quickly that both advancement places would go to the second-heat competitors, Canada and Italy. At the 500 metre quarter-mark, Norway was 2.7 seconds behind Italy for second place; Canada held a slight lead for first. Italy took over in the second 500 metres, racing to a full second lead over Canada while Norway dropped to 3.7 seconds out of second place. Switzerland, at this point, was over 6 seconds behind Norway and clearly out of the running. Italy maintained its lead over Canada through the 1500 metre point, but the Canadians turned the 1 second deficit into a 0.6 second win in the final quarter of the race.

Rank	Rower	Nation	Time	Notes
1	Peter MacGowan; Tim Storm	Canada	6:38.33	QA
2	Francesco Esposito; Ruggero Verroca	Italy	6:38.91	QA
3	Alf Hansen; Rolf Thorsen	Norway	6:43.44	QB
4	Marc-Sven Nater; Urs Steinemann	Switzerland	7:01.93	QB

=== Finals ===
==== Final B ====
The "B" final, for 7th through 11th places, was held on 3 August. It was a warm day (23 °C) with a 0.5 m/s east wind. Austria and Finland went back and forth for the top two spots, with Austria leading at the quarter-mark, Finland leading at the half-mark and three-quarters-mark, and Austria finishing in the lead by 0.09 seconds. The Swiss boat was in third place at 500 metres and fourth place at 1000 metres before permanently falling back to last place (5th in the race, 11th overall). Mexico, which had finished after both Norway and Switzerland in the heats, now prevailed against them, finishing third in the "B" final and 9th overall.

Rank	Rower	Nation	Time
7	Wilfried Auerbach; Thomas Linemayr	Austria	6:44.54
8	Reima Karppinen; Aarne Lindroos	Finland	6:44.43
9	Eduardo Arrillaga; Armando Chávez	Mexico	6:42.86
10	Alf Hansen; Rolf Thorsen	Norway	6:43.44
11	Marc-Sven Nater; Urs Steinemann	Switzerland	7:01.93

==== Final A ====
The main final was held on 5 August. The temperature was 20 °C and there was a 0.5 m/s east-northeast wind. The Belgian and Canadian pairs led at the start, with Belgium half a second ahead of Canada and 1.5 seconds ahead of Yugoslavia at the 500 metre mark. West Germany and Italy followed, with the United States at the rear. At the halfway point, the race appeared to belong to the Belgians, who had opened a 2-second lead against Yugoslavia as Canada fell back to fourth place. The Americans had passed Italy by halfway, as well. The American charge did not stop, either, as they pulled into second place at 1500 metres, though Belgium's lead was now nearly 2.5 seconds. Yugoslavia was about 1 second behind the Americans, and the West Germans were 1 second behind the Yugoslav team. Canada, followed by Italy, were well out of medal contention three-quarters through the race. Over the final 500 metres, the Americans completed their last-to-first push, taking the final quarter in 3.76 seconds less than the leading Belgians to win by over 1.3 seconds. Yugoslavia was able to hold off West Germany for bronze, while Canada finished its fall from second to sixth when Italy passed them in the final quarter.

Rank	Rower	Nation	Time
1st place, gold medalist(s)	Paul Enquist; Brad Alan Lewis	United States	6:36.87
2nd place, silver medalist(s)	Dirk Crois; Pierre-Marie Deloof	Belgium	6:38.19
3rd place, bronze medalist(s)	Zoran Pančić Milorad Stanulov	Yugoslavia	6:39.59
4	Georg Agrikola; Andreas Schmelz	West Germany	6:40.41
5	Francesco Esposito; Ruggero Verroca	Italy	6:44.29
6	Peter MacGowan; Tim Storm	Canada	6:46.68

== Final classification ==
Rank	Rowers	Country
1st place, gold medalist(s)	Brad Alan Lewis; Paul Enquist	United States
2nd place, silver medalist(s)	Pierre-Marie Deloof; Dirk Crois	Belgium
3rd place, bronze medalist(s)	Zoran Pančić; Milorad Stanulov	Yugoslavia
4	Andreas Schmelz; Georg Agrikola	West Germany
5	Francesco Esposito; Ruggero Verroca	Italy
6	Tim Storm; Peter MacGowan	Canada
7	Wilfried Auerbach; Thomas Linemayr	Austria
8	Reima Karppinen; Aarne Lindroos	Finland
9	Armando Chávez; Eduardo Arrillaga	Mexico
10	Alf Hansen; Rolf Thorsen	Norway
11	Marc-Sven Nater; Urs Steinemann; Daniel Winkler	Switzerland
