= Belgium at the 1984 Summer Olympics =

- IOC code: BEL
- NOC: Belgian Olympic and Interfederal Committee
- Website: www.teambelgium.be (in Dutch and French)

in Los Angeles
- Competitors: 63 (47 men, 16 women) in 14 sports
- Flag bearer: Edgar Henri Cuepper
- Medals Ranked 21st: Gold 1 Silver 1 Bronze 2 Total 4

Summer Olympics appearances (overview)
- 1900; 1904; 1908; 1912; 1920; 1924; 1928; 1932; 1936; 1948; 1952; 1956; 1960; 1964; 1968; 1972; 1976; 1980; 1984; 1988; 1992; 1996; 2000; 2004; 2008; 2012; 2016; 2020; 2024; 2028

Other related appearances
- 1906 Intercalated Games

Belgium competed at the 1984 Summer Olympics in Los Angeles. 63 competitors, 47 men and 16 women, took part in 48 events in 14 sports.

== Medalists ==
Medal	Name	Sport	Event	Date
Gold	Roger Ilegems	Cycling	Men's points race	3 August
Silver	Pierre-Marie Deloof; Dirk Crois	Rowing	Men's double sculls	5 August
Bronze	Ingrid Lempereur	Swimming	Women's 200 m breaststroke	30 July
Bronze	Ann Haesebrouck	Rowing	Women's single sculls	4 August

== Archery ==
Women competed for the first time in Belgium's fourth appearance in the modern archery competition. Marnix Vervinck was only the second Belgian to place in the top eight, and the first since 1972.

Women's Individual Competition:

- Marie Claire van Stevens — 2431 points (→ 22nd place)
- Raymonda Verlinden — 2288 points (→ 40th place)

Men's Individual Competition:

- Marnix Vervinck — 2519 points (→ 7th place)
- Patrick DeKoning — 2486 (→ 14th place)
- Willy van den Bossche — 2454 points (→ 26th place)

== Athletics ==
Men's 5,000 metres

- Bob Verbeeck
  - Heat — 13:46.27
  - Semifinals — 13:46.03 (→ did not advance)
- Vincent Rousseau
  - Heat — 13:57.96 (→ did not advance)

Men's Marathon

- Karel Lismont — 2:17:07 (→ 24th place)
- Armand Parmentier — 2:18:10 (→ 30th place)
- Johan Geirnaert — 2:21:35 (→ 41st place)

Men's High Jump

- Eddy Annys
  - Qualification — 2.21m (→ did not advance)

Men's Long Jump

- Ronald Desruelles
  - Qualification — did not start (→ did not advance, no ranking)

Women's Marathon

- Ria Van Landeghem
  - Final — 2:37:11 (→ 21st place)
- Marie-Christine Deurbroeck
  - Final — 2:38:01 (→ 24th place)
- Francine Peeters
  - Final — 2:42:22 (→ 29th place)

Women's High Jump

- Christine Soetewey
  - Qualification — 1.80m (→ did not advance, 22nd place)

== Cycling ==
Eight cyclists represented Belgium in 1984.

Individual road race

- Carlo Bomans
- Ronny Van Sweevelt
- Frank Verleyen

Sprint

- Frank Orban

Individual pursuit

- Rudi Ceyssens

Team pursuit

- Rudi Ceyssens
- Roger Ilegems
- Peter Roes
- Joseph Smeets

Points race

- Roger Ilegems
  - Final — 37 points (→ Gold Medal)
- Rudi Ceyssens
  - Final — 16 points (→ 11th place)

== Diving ==
Men's 3m Springboard

- Tom Lemaire
  - Preliminary Round — 515.16 points (→ did not advance, 16th place)

== Fencing ==
Four fencers, all men, represented Belgium in 1984.

Men's foil

- Thierry Soumagne
- Peter Joos
- Stefan Joos

Men's team foil

- Thierry Soumagne, Peter Joos, Stefan Joos, Stéphane Ganeff

Men's épée

- Stéphane Ganeff
- Thierry Soumagne
- Stefan Joos

== Swimming ==
Men's 400m Freestyle

- Marc Van De Weghe
  - Heat — 4:00.01 (→ did not advance, 20th place)

Men's 1500m Freestyle

- Marc Van De Weghe
  - Heat — 15:45.50 (→ did not advance, 19th place)

Women's 100m Backstroke

- Sabine Pauwels
  - Heat — 1:05.17
  - B-Final — 1:05.33 (→ 15th place)
- Yolande Van Der Straeten
  - Heat — 1:07.07 (→ did not advance, 22nd place)

Women's 200m Backstroke

- Yolande Van Der Straeten
  - Heat — 2:18.49
  - B-Final — 2:18.63 (→ 13th place)
- Sabine Pauwels
  - Heat — 2:21.36 (→ did not advance, 18th place)

Women's 200m Individual Medley

- Sabine Pauwels
  - Heat — 2:22.86 (→ did not advance, 17th place)
