= Landvoigt =

Landvoigt is a German surname that may refer to

- Arnold Landvoigt (1879–1970), German rugby union player
- Bernd Landvoigt (born 1951), German rower
- Jörg Landvoigt (born 1951), German rower, twin brother of Bernd
- Ike Landvoigt (born 1973), German rower, son of Jörg
