= Rowing at the 1980 Summer Olympics – Men's coxless pair =

Men's coxless pair at the Games of the XXII Olympiad
- Venue: Krylatskoye Sports Complex Canoeing and Rowing Basin
- Date: 20–27 July 1980
- Competitors: 30 from 15 nations

Medalists
1st place, gold medalist(s)		Bernd Landvoigt and Jörg Landvoigt	East Germany
2nd place, silver medalist(s)		Yuriy Pimenov and Nikolay Pimenov	Soviet Union
3rd place, bronze medalist(s)		Charles Wiggin and Malcolm Carmichael	Great Britain

The men's coxless pair rowing competition at the 1980 Summer Olympics took place at Krylatskoye Sports Complex Canoeing and Rowing Basin, Moscow, Soviet Union. The event was held from 20 to 27 July.

== Heats ==
The three fastest teams in each heat advanced to the semifinals. The remaining teams must compete in repechage for the remaining spots in the semifinals.

=== Heat One ===
Rank	Athletes names	Country	Time
1	Bernd Landvoigt; Jörg Landvoigt	East Germany	7:19.05
2	Constantin Postoiu; Valer Toma	Romania	7:30.90
3	Wilfried Auerbach; Thomas Linemayr	Austria	7:39.48
4	Michael Jessen; Erik Christiansen	Denmark	7:43.04
5	Nikolaos Ioannidis; Georgios Kourkoumbas	Greece	7:58.37

=== Heat Two ===
Rank	Athletes names	Country	Time
1	Yuriy Pimenov; Nikolay Pimenov	Soviet Union	7:25.09
2	Charles Wiggin; Malcolm Carmichael	Great Britain	7:30.57
3	Miroslav Vraštil; Miroslav Knapek	Czechoslovakia	7:34.83
4	José Pardas; Luis Miguel Oliver	Spain	7:46.00
5	Robert Lang; John Bolt	Australia	7:50.05

=== Heat Three ===
Rank	Athletes names	Country	Time
1	Franco Valtorta; Antonio Baldacci	Italy	7:28.77
2	Jean-Claude Roussel; Dominique Lecointe	France	7:33.20
3	Pat Gannon; Willie Ryan	Ireland	7:35.10
4	Anders Larson; Anders Wilgotson	Sweden	7:44.16
5	Edgar Nanne; Alberik de Suremain	Guatemala	8:06.53

== Repechage ==
The three fastest teams in the repechage advanced to the semifinals.

Rank	Athletes names	Country	Time
1	Michael Jessen; Erik Christiansen	Denmark	7:08.21
2	Anders Larson; Anders Wilgotson	Sweden	7:09.51
3	Robert Lang; John Bolt	Australia	7:13.24
4	José Pardas; Luis Miguel Oliver	Spain	7:18.45
5	Nikolaos Ioannidis; Georgios Kourkoumbas	Greece	7:24.93
6	Edgar Nanne; Alberik de Suremain	Guatemala	7:34.09

== Semifinals ==
The three fastest teams in each semifinal advanced to the final.

=== Semifinal One ===
Rank	Athletes names	Country	Time
1	Bernd Landvoigt; Jörg Landvoigt	East Germany	6:40.54
2	Charles Wiggin; Malcolm Carmichael	Great Britain	6:51.47
3	Anders Larson; Anders Wilgotson	Sweden	6:54.12
4	Franco Valtorta; Antonio Baldacci	Italy	7:00.79
5	Pat Gannon; Willie Ryan	Ireland	7:02.11
6	Wilfried Auerbach; Thomas Linemayr	Austria	7:04.48

=== Semifinal Two ===
Rank	Athletes names	Country	Time
1	Yuriy Pimenov; Nikolay Pimenov	Soviet Union	6:52.11
2	Constantin Postoiu; Valer Toma	Romania	6:52.70
3	Miroslav Vraštil; Miroslav Knapek	Czechoslovakia	6:56.70
4	Michael Jessen; Erik Christiansen	Denmark	6:56.90
5	Jean-Claude Roussel; Dominique Lecointe	France	7:10.26
6	Robert Lang; John Bolt	Australia	7:11.76

== Finals ==
=== Finals A ===
Rank	Athletes names	Country	Time
1st place, gold medalist(s)	Bernd Landvoigt; Jörg Landvoigt	East Germany	6:48.01
2nd place, silver medalist(s)	Yuriy Pimenov; Nikolay Pimenov	Soviet Union	6:50.50
3rd place, bronze medalist(s)	Charles Wiggin; Malcolm Carmichael	Great Britain	6:51.47
4	Constantin Postoiu; Valer Toma	Romania	6:53.49
5	Miroslav Vraštil; Miroslav Knapek	Czechoslovakia	7:01.54
6	Anders Larson; Anders Wilgotson	Sweden	7:02.52

This is still the only Olympic final where two sets of twins finished on the podium.

=== Finals B ===
Rank	Athletes names	Country	Time
7	Pat Gannon; Willie Ryan	Ireland	6:54.60
8	Jean-Claude Roussel; Dominique Lecointe	France	6:55.22
9	Wilfried Auerbach; Thomas Linemayr	Austria	6:58.96
10	Robert Lang; John Bolt	Australia	6:59.13
11	Franco Valtorta; Antonio Baldacci	Italy	7:00.71
–	Michael Jessen; Erik Christiansen	Denmark	np

== Sources ==
- I. T. Novikov (ed.). The Official Report of the Games of the XXII Olympiad Moscow 1980 Volume Three (PDF) (PDF). p. 106. Archived from the original (PDF) on 27 September 2007.
