= Swimming at the 1984 Summer Olympics – Women's 100 metre backstroke =

Women's 100 metre backstroke at the Games of the XXIII Olympiad
- Venue: McDonald's Olympic Swim Stadium
- Date: 31 July 1984 (heats & final)
- Competitors: 32 from 22 nations
- Winning time: 1:02.55

Medalists
| 1st place, gold medalist(s) | | Theresa Andrews | United States |
| 2nd place, silver medalist(s) | | Betsy Mitchell | United States |
| 3rd place, bronze medalist(s) | | Jolanda de Rover | Netherlands |

The final of the women's 100 metre backstroke event at the 1984 Summer Olympics was held in the McDonald's Olympic Swim Stadium in Los Angeles, California, on July 31, 1984.

== Records ==
Prior to this competition, the existing world and Olympic records were as follows.

| World record | Rica Reinisch (GDR) | 1:00.86 | Moscow, Soviet Union | 23 July 1980 |
| Olympic record | Rica Reinisch (GDR) | 1:00.86 | Moscow, Soviet Union | 23 July 1980 |

== Results ==
=== Heats ===
Rule: The eight fastest swimmers advance to final A (Q), while the next eight to final B (q).

| Rank | Heat | Lane | Name | Nationality | Time | Notes |
|---|---|---|---|---|---|---|
| 1 | 2 | 4 | Betsy Mitchell | United States | 1:02.53 | Q |
| 2 | 1 | 4 | Theresa Andrews | United States | 1:02.94 | Q |
| 2 | 4 | 5 | Jolanda de Rover | Netherlands | 1:02.94 | Q |
| 4 | 4 | 2 | Beverley Rose | Great Britain | 1:03.61 | Q, NR |
| 5 | 4 | 4 | Carmen Bunaciu | Romania | 1:03.79 | Q |
| 6 | 2 | 5 | Svenja Schlicht | West Germany | 1:04.02 | Q |
| 7 | 3 | 4 | Anca Pătrășcoiu | Romania | 1:04.16 | Q |
| 8 | 1 | 3 | Brigitte van der Lans | Netherlands | 1:04.57 | QSO |
| 8 | 2 | 5 | Carmel Clark | New Zealand | 1:04.57 | QSO |
| 10 | 2 | 3 | Manuela Carosi | Italy | 1:04.77 | q |
| 11 | 3 | 5 | Georgina Parkes | Australia | 1:04.90 | q |
| 12 | 3 | 3 | Reema Abdo | Canada | 1:04.92 | q |
| 13 | 1 | 5 | Audrey Moore | Australia | 1:04.96 | q |
| 14 | 1 | 6 | Catherine White | Great Britain | 1:05.03 | q |
| 15 | 4 | 7 | Sabine Pauwels | Belgium | 1:05.17 | q |
| 16 | 3 | 6 | Eva Gysling | Switzerland | 1:05.18 | q |
| 17 | 3 | 2 | Sandra Dahlmann | West Germany | 1:05.27 | |
| 18 | 1 | 7 | Naomi Sekido | Japan | 1:05.60 | |
| 19 | 1 | 2 | Michelle MacPherson | Canada | 1:06.04 | |
| 20 | 4 | 6 | Anna-Karin Eriksson | Sweden | 1:06.09 | |
| 21 | 4 | 3 | Teresa Rivera | Mexico | 1:06.39 | |
| 22 | 2 | 6 | Yolande van der Straeten | Belgium | 1:07.07 | |
| 23 | 3 | 7 | Nozomi Sunouchi | Japan | 1:07.23 | |
| 24 | 2 | 7 | Choi Yun-hui | South Korea | 1:07.35 | |
| 25 | 3 | 1 | Guo Huaying | China | 1:08.21 | |
| 26 | 1 | 1 | Lotta Flink | Hong Kong | 1:09.70 | |
| 27 | 4 | 8 | Kathy Wong | Hong Kong | 1:10.19 | |
| 28 | 2 | 8 | Christine Jacob | Philippines | 1:10.28 | |
| 29 | 1 | 8 | Sharon Pickering | Fiji | 1:10.49 | |
| 30 | 2 | 1 | Petra Bekaert | Netherlands Antilles | 1:10.60 | |
| 31 | 3 | 8 | Helen Chow | Malaysia | 1:11.30 | |
| | 4 | 1 | Lise Lotte Nylund | Norway | DNS | |

==== Swimoff ====
| Rank | Lane | Name | Nationality | Time | Notes |
|---|---|---|---|---|---|
| 1 | 5 | Carmel Clark | New Zealand | 1:04.33 | Q, NR |
| 2 | 4 | Brigitte van der Lans | Netherlands | 1:04.82 | q |

=== Finals ===
==== Final B ====
| Rank | Lane | Name | Nationality | Time | Notes |
|---|---|---|---|---|---|
| 9 | 2 | Audrey Moore | Australia | 1:04.15 | |
| 10 | 5 | Manuela Carosi | Italy | 1:04.52 | |
| 10 | 3 | Georgina Parkes | Australia | 1:04.52 | |
| 12 | 4 | Brigitte van der Lans | Netherlands | 1:04.75 | |
| 13 | 7 | Catherine White | Great Britain | 1:04.99 | |
| 14 | 6 | Reema Abdo | Canada | 1:05.13 | |
| 15 | 1 | Sabine Pauwels | Belgium | 1:05.33 | |
| 16 | 8 | Eva Gysling | Switzerland | 1:06.11 | |

==== Final A ====
| Rank | Lane | Name | Nationality | Time | Notes |
|---|---|---|---|---|---|
| 1st place, gold medalist(s) | 3 | Theresa Andrews | United States | 1:02.55 | |
| 2nd place, silver medalist(s) | 4 | Betsy Mitchell | United States | 1:02.63 | |
| 3rd place, bronze medalist(s) | 5 | Jolanda de Rover | Netherlands | 1:02.91 | |
| 4 | 2 | Carmen Bunaciu | Romania | 1:03.21 | |
| 5 | 1 | Anca Pătrășcoiu | Romania | 1:03.29 | |
| 6 | 7 | Svenja Schlicht | West Germany | 1:03.46 | NR |
| 7 | 6 | Beverley Rose | Great Britain | 1:04.16 | |
| 8 | 8 | Carmel Clark | New Zealand | 1:04.47 | |
