= Bernd Landvoigt =

East German rower

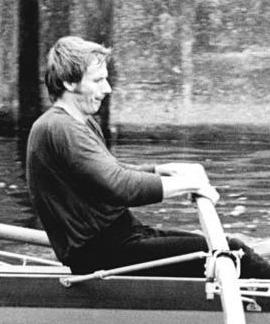
- Landvoigt in 1978

Personal information
- Born: 23 March 1951 (age 75) Brandenburg an der Havel, East Germany
- Height: 1.88 m (6 ft 2 in)
- Weight: 88 kg (194 lb)
- Spouse: Viola Goretzki
- Relatives: Jörg Landvoigt (brother); Ike Landvoigt (nephew)

Sport
- Sport: Rowing
- Club: SG Dynamo Potsdam
Medal record
Men's rowing
Representing East Germany
Olympic Games
Gold medal – first place	1976 Montreal	Coxless pair
Gold medal – first place	1980 Moscow	Coxless pair
Bronze medal – third place	1972 Munich	Eight
World Rowing Championships
Gold medal – first place	1974 Lucerne	Coxless pair
Gold medal – first place	1975 Nottingham	Coxless pair
Gold medal – first place	1978 Hamilton	Coxless pair
Gold medal – first place	1979 Bled	Coxless pair

Bernd Landvoigt (born 23 March 1951) is a retired German rower.

Landvoigt and his twin brother Jörg were born in Brandenburg an der Havel, then in the German Democratic Republic. Their father was a boatman: their mother worked as a secretary.

Bernd Landvoigt had his best achievements in the coxless pairs, rowing with his twin Jörg. Between 1974 and 1980 they won all but one 180 races they competed in, including four world championships and two Olympics; they only lost once, to other twins, Yuri and Nikolay Pimenov. Landvoigt brothers also won a bronze medal in the eights at the 1972 Olympics and a European title in coxless fours in 1973.

After retiring from competitions Bernd Landvoigt worked as a rowing coach, first at his club SG Dynamo Potsdam and later with the national team. His wife Viola Goretzki and nephew Ike Landvoigt are also retired Olympic rowers.
