= VK Danubius 1885 =

Serbian rowing club

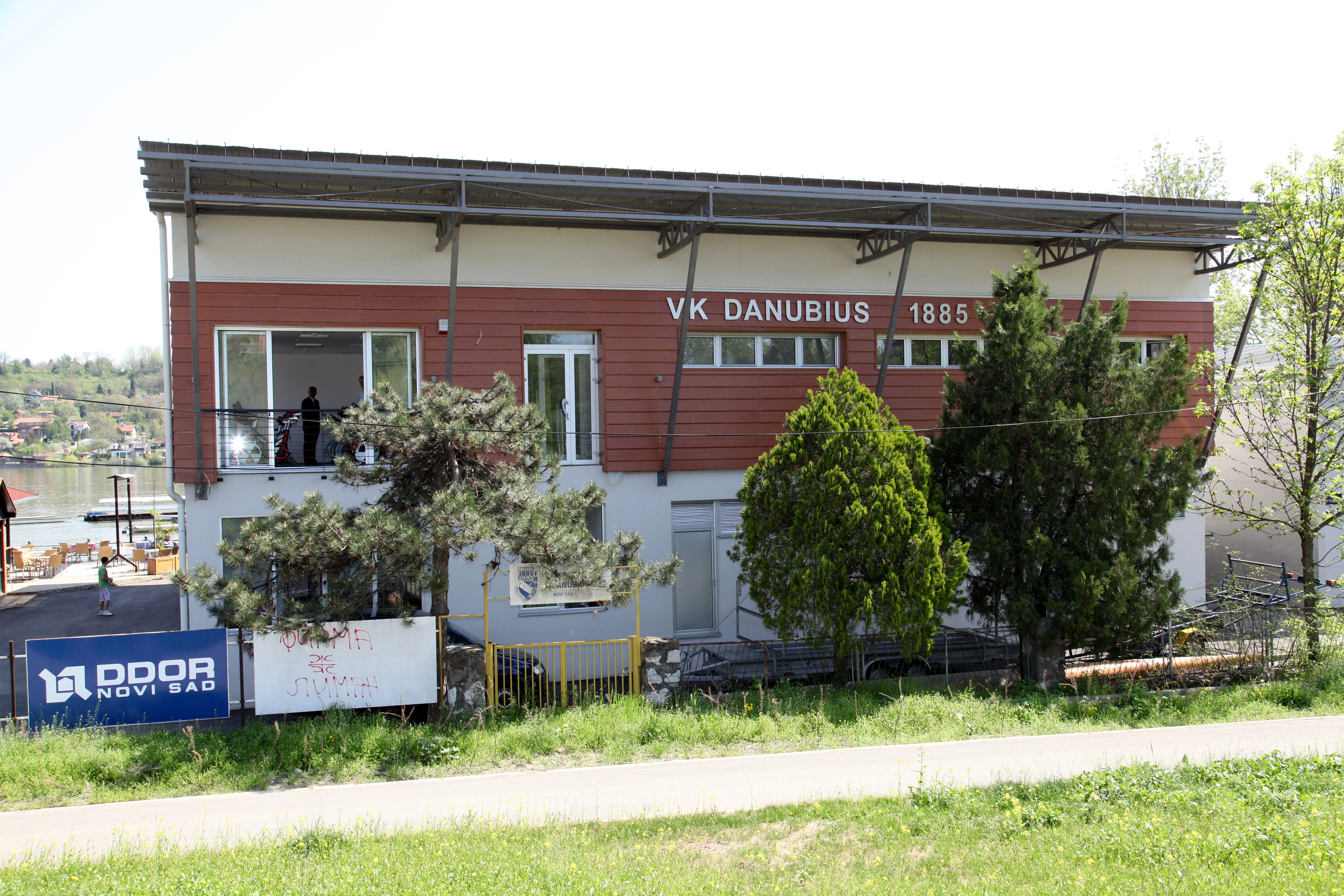
- Location: Sunčani kej 4, Novi Sad, Vojvodina, Serbia
- Coordinates: 45.2385067°N 19.8502383°E
- Home water: Danube River
- Founded: 28 March 1885; 140 years ago
- Key people: Željko Pantović (President)
- Website: www.danubius1885.org

Veslački klub Danubius 1885 (Serbian Cyrillic: Веслачки клуб Данубијус 1885) is a Serbian rowing club from Novi Sad, Vojvodina, Serbia. The club was founded in 1885 and is the oldest rowing club in former Yugoslavia.

== Location ==
Since its founding, the club has been located on the Danube. For over 50 years it has been located at Sunčani kej 4, next to the city beach Štrand, kayak canoe club Vojvodina, restaurant Cesla and the Novi Sad quay.

== History ==
The idea of rowing as a sport was first brought to Novi Sad by the poet Laza Kostić, with the unofficial beginnings of Danubius starting with the founding of Prva udruga vatrogasna, veslačka i jahačka (First Firefighting, Rowing, and Riding Association) in 1872. From this association, several groups and clubs would emerge in the following decades, including the Novosadsko vatrogasno društvo that exists to this day. The idea of the first independent rowing club started with merchant Viktor Menrat. The idea was supported by the citizens of Novi Sad, and as a result of their support a Statute and Regulations of the rowing club Danubius were adopted on 28 March 1885, with Viktor Menrat being the club's first president.

The first test run was recorded in the first book of outings, and it reports that on 10 May 1885, Vitoršek, Savin, Menrat, Melhuk, Bala and Frank, with the helmsman Karl Mayer, went out on the water in a rowing boat for six called Stefania. In addition to the names of the crew and the date, the helmsman also wrote the following:

Prva probna vožnja. Po povoljnom vremenu, bez vetra i sunčanom danu, bez postavljenog cilja. Polazak u tri časa popodne. Uzvodno se veslalo do polovine Kameničkog ostrva. Tada je momčad donela odluku da obiđe ostrvo i posle obilaska vrha ostrva da se vesla do Kamenice. Nakon jednočasovnog odmora, usledio je povratak.
First test run. In good weather, without wind and on a sunny day, without a set goal. Departure at three o'clock in the afternoon. Rowed upstream up to half of Kamenica Island. Then the team made the decision to go around the island and after visiting the top of the island to row to Kamenica. After a one-hour rest, it was time to return.

— Karl Mayer s.r., Danubius Prva knjiga izlazaka na vodu

When talking about the results of Danubius, the first type of competitions can be found within the club itself from training and the number of kilometers traveled. Summarized reports from the outing books at the end of each year show progress. In 1904 Dr Korenj Vilmoš rowed 815 kilometers, in 1907 Tišler Aladar was the first with 1430 kilometers, with Aladar improving his own record in 1911 when he rowed 2098 kilometers.

The club was inclusive from the very beginning, allowing anyone from Novi Sad and Petrovaradin to join, regardless of their nationality and ethnicity. However, members had to provide the props themselves, and the clothes that the rower had to wear were also prescribed. A blue and white cap, a blue and white shirt with yellow drawstring and blue embroidered club name, short blue čakšire with dark blue belt, a blue coat and white canvas shoes lined with yellow leather. Due to all these conditions, the club initially had only 11 members, but after two years of existence the number of members grew to 21. By the beginning of the First World War, the club would become a large organization with over 200 members.

Even though there were significant successes even before the First World War, the club rose to heights when Dr Ignjat Pavlas became the president in 1921, who, in addition to his responsibilities in the club, also known as the builder of the Falconry club in Novi Sad, mountaineer, lawyer, humanist, and patriot. In 1922, a victory was recorded at the regional regatta in Vukovar, and in 1924 Danubius became the national team champion.

While the club is credited for being the oldest rowing club in former Yugoslavia, it was also the pioneer in other activities. Around 1935, the club was among the first in Yugoslavia to adopt the sleek boats and the Fernburn style, improving their results.

Rowers played an important role in the Second World War by carrying mail for the Partizans to Srem. In this war, the club was left without its president Dr Ignjat Pavlas, who was at the head of the club until 1938, until the encroachment of fascism. Due to the emergence of this ideology, he was killed in the Novi Sad raid at the end of January 1942. Without most of the boats and without 16 of its members, who died on various battlefields, the club started almost from the beginning.

The club was the first in Yugoslavia to introduce rowing for women. In this period, gold medals began to slowly return, with Knebl and Ladišić being Serbian champions in 1950 in the duo without a coxswain for the first class.

The most successful period of the club was in the 1970s and 1980s, with the club dominating the Yugoslav rowing scene. For ten consecutive years, the team won the state championship, as well as medals at world championships. Zoran Pančić with Milorad Stanulov from Zrenjanin won silver medals in men's double sculls at the 1980 Summer Olympics in Moscow. They would also win bronze medals in men's double sculls at the 1984 Summer Olympics in Los Angeles. Dragan Obradović was second at the World Rowing Junior Championships in Montreal in 1975, with Boris Marković winning silver in Vichy in 1983. The biggest merits of this golden period of the club belong to the coach Srba Saratlić, who at the time was also the federal coach of Yugoslavia.

Since the breakup of Yugoslavia, the club continued to have members with successful results at both local and international championships.

In 2013, with the help of the Government of Vojvodina, the 50-year-old club building was torn down and reconstructed. With an investment of 80 million dinars, new building encompasses 1094 square meters, consisting of a ground floor, first floor, and a gallery. The ground floor has a hanger where 50 boats are stored and a business area for the club's supervisors, while the first floor has a gym and training area. The City of Novi Sad gifted the club new boats and requisites by the end of the year.

In January 2023, the city unveiled plans to expand the Štrand beach downstream and refurbish the beach area with more entertainment options and accommodations, moving the rowing club Danubius 1885, kayak canoe club Vojvodina and restaurant Cesla to Kamenica Island upstream. The realization of this plan will not start until these locals are moved to their new locations.

== Notable members ==
Some of the most remarkable athletes that have represented the VK Danubius 1885 since its inception were:

- Zoran Pančić (1953– )
- Dragan Obradović (1957– )
- Bojan Mandarić: won the bronze medal in the 2001 World Rowing Junior Championships in Duisburg for junior seniors.
- Čedomir Nikitović; won a silver medal in 2003, bronze in 2004, and gold in 2005 at the World Rowing Junior Championships for younger seniors.
- Iva Obradović (1984– )
- Ivana Filipović (1989– )
