= Viola Goretzki =

East German rower

Personal information
- Born: 23 November 1956 (age 69) Zwickau, Bezirk Karl-Marx-Stadt, East Germany
- Height: 1.82 m (6 ft 0 in)
- Weight: 77 kg (170 lb)
- Spouse: Bernd Landvoigt
- Relatives: Jörg Landvoigt (brother-in-law); Ike Landvoigt (nephew)

Sport
- Sport: Rowing
- Club: SG Dynamo Potsdam
Medal record
Women's rowing
Representing East Germany
Olympic Games
Gold medal – first place	1976 Montreal	Eight
World Rowing Championships
Gold medal – first place	1975 Nottingham	Eight

Viola Goretzki (later Landvoigt; born 23 November 1956) is a retired German rower. She won a world title in 1975 and an Olympic gold medal in 1976 at the 1976 Montreal in the eight event. For these achievements she was awarded the Patriotic Order of Merit in 1976. Her husband Bernd Landvoigt, brother-in-law Jörg Landvoigt and nephew Ike Landvoigt are also retired Olympic rowers.
