= Jörg Landvoigt =

East German rower

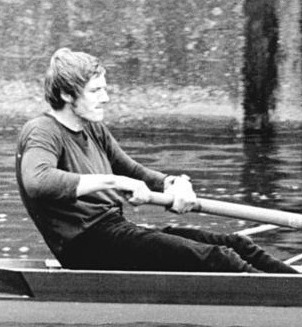
- Landvoigt in 1978

Personal information
- Born: 23 March 1951 (age 75) Brandenburg an der Havel, East Germany
- Height: 1.88 m (6 ft 2 in)
- Weight: 88 kg (194 lb)
- Relatives: Bernd Landvoigt (brother); Viola Goretzki (sister-in-law); Ike Landvoigt (nephew)

Sport
- Sport: Rowing
- Club: SG Dynamo Potsdam
Medal record
Men's rowing
Representing East Germany
Olympic Games
Gold medal – first place	1976 Montreal	Coxless pair
Gold medal – first place	1980 Moscow	Coxless pair
Bronze medal – third place	1972 Munich	Eight
World Rowing Championships
Gold medal – first place	1974 Lucerne	Coxless pair
Gold medal – first place	1975 Nottingham	Coxless pair
Gold medal – first place	1978 Hamilton	Coxless pair
Gold medal – first place	1979 Bled	Coxless pair
European Rowing Championships
Gold medal – first place	1973 Moscow	Eight

Jörg Landvoigt (born 23 March, 1951) is a retired German rower.

He and his twin brother Bernd, were born in Brandenburg an der Havel, East Germany. Their father was a boatman, while their mother worked as a secretary.

Jörg Landvoigt had his best achievements in the coxless pairs, rowing with his twin. Between 1974 and 1980, they won all but one of the 180 races in which they competed, including four world championships and two Olympics; they only lost once, to other twins, Yuri and Nikolay Pimenov. The Landvoigt brothers also won a bronze medal in the eights at the 1972 Olympics and a European title in coxless fours in 1973.

Jörg is left-handed, whereas Bernd is right-handed. After retiring from competitions, Jörg worked as a rowing coach at his club SG Dynamo Potsdam and later with the junior national team. Today he works for the Regional Sports Federation of Brandenburg. In 1998, he became the honorary chairman of the Havel-Regatta-Verein von 1920. In this position, he organises and plans regional and national rowing events in the areas of Potsdam and Brandenburg, such as the 2005 World Rowing Junior Championships in Brandenburg. His son Ike also went on to become an Olympic rower.
