= John Bolt =

John Bolt may refer to:

- John F. Bolt (1921–2004), naval aviator in the United States Marine Corps
- John Bolt (theologian) (born 1947), American-Dutch Reformed theologian
- John Bolt (rower) (born 1956), Australian rower
