= Daniel Winkler =

Daniel Winkler can refer to:

- Dan Winkler (born 1990), American baseball player
- Daniel Winkler (gymnast) (born 1962), German Olympic gymnast
- Daniel Winkler (knifemaker), American knifemaker
- Daniel Winkler (rower) (born 1959), Swiss Olympic rower
- Danny Winkler (born 1973), German footballer
