= Brigitte van der Lans =

Dutch swimmer (born 1968)

Personal information
- Born: July 28, 1968 (age 57) Hoevelaken, Netherlands

Sport
- Sport: Swimming
- Strokes: Backstroke

Brigitte van der Lans (born 28 July 1968) is a Dutch former backstroke swimmer, who competed at the 1984 Olympics in Los Angeles. She finished 12th in the 100 metre backstroke and 17th in the 200 metre backstroke, the latter of which was won by her teammate Jolanda de Rover. She also participated at the 1985 European Aquatics Championships in Sofia, Bulgaria.
