= Theresa Andrews =

American swimmer (born 1962)

Personal information
- National team: United States
- Born: August 25, 1962 (age 63) New London, Connecticut, U.S.
- Height: 5ft 5.5 in (1.67 m)
- Weight: 137 lb (62 kg)

Sport
- Sport: Swimming
- Strokes: Backstroke
- Club: North Baltimore Aquatic Club
- College team: Indiana University; University of Florida
Medal record
Women's swimming
Representing the United States
Olympic Games
Gold medal – first place	1984 Los Angeles	100 m backstroke
Gold medal – first place	1984 Los Angeles	4×100 m medley

Theresa Andrews (born August 25, 1962) is an American former competitive swimmer and Olympic champion. Raised in Maryland, Andrews gained prominence as a national collegiate champion when competing for the University of Florida. In international competition, she was a backstroke specialist who won two gold medals at the 1984 Summer Olympics.

== Early years ==
Andrews was born in New London, Connecticut, on August 25, 1962. She grew up in Annapolis, Maryland, where she initially attended St. Mary's High School. She was one of twelve children of Frank and Maxine Andrews; her father was a graduate of the U.S. Naval Academy and a former U.S. Navy officer. Andrews first trained in the Navy Junior Program as an age-group swimmer, and then moved to the North Baltimore Aquatic Club (NBAC), attending Archbishop Keough High School in Baltimore, Maryland, and staying with a succession of five sponsoring local families during her final two years of high school. She later described her training regime as "six hours a day, six days a week ... training in a pool." Andrews was among the first generation of elite swimmers to train under coach Murray Stephens at NBAC, a club that has produced a succession of Olympic swimmers after her, including Michael Phelps and Katie Hoff. She was the first Olympic medalist produced by the club.

== Career ==
=== College swimming career ===
Andrews accepted an athletic scholarship to attend Indiana University in Bloomington, Indiana, and swam for the Indiana Hoosiers swimming and diving team in Association for Intercollegiate Athletics for Women (AIAW) and Big Ten Conference competition during the 1980–81 school year. As a Hoosier swimmer, she won six Big Ten titles, and earned five All-American honors.

After her freshman season, Andrews transferred to the University of Florida in Gainesville, Florida, where she swam for coach Randy Reese's Florida Gators swimming and diving team in National Collegiate Athletic Association (NCAA) and Southeastern Conference (SEC) competition in 1982 and 1983. As a Gator, she was an eleven-time SEC champion, including the 50-yard backstroke (twice), 100-yard backstroke (twice), 200-yard backstroke, and six relays. She was a three-time NCAA champion (twice in the 400-yard medley relay, and once in the 200-yard medley relay), and received a total of eighteen All-American honors. The Gators won the 1982 NCAA women's team championship, and the Gators' winning 400-yard medley relay team of Andrews, Amy Caulkins, Michele Kurtzman and Kathy Treible set a new American national record in the event of 3:40.99. Andrews, together with teammates Kurtzman, Treible and Tracy Caulkins, won the NCAA 400-yard medley relay event again in 1983, and the Gators placed second overall at the NCAA championship tournament.

=== 1984 Olympic swimming ===
Andrews qualified to represent the United States at the 1984 Summer Olympics in Los Angeles, where she won two gold medals. She gained her first gold in the women's 100-meter backstroke, narrowly edging fellow American Betsy Mitchell by eight one-hundredths (.08) of a second – about five inches – for a final time of 1:02.55. It was the first time she had ever beaten Mitchell. She earned her second gold by swimming the lead-off backstroke leg for the first-place U.S. team in the women's 4×100-meter medley relay event, sharing the honors with her American teammates Tracy Caulkins (breaststroke), Mary T. Meagher (butterfly), and Nancy Hogshead (freestyle), and clocking a winning time of 4:08.34. Her split time of 1:04.00 was slower than her gold-medal time in the individual 100-meter backstroke, but her teammates made up the difference to win and set a new American record in the event.

Andrews later gave her first Olympic gold medal to her brother Danny in a private gathering, honoring him for his courage when he was paralyzed at the age of 19 after being struck by a car two years earlier. After the Olympics, she retired from competitive swimming at the age of 21.

== Life after competition swimming ==
Andrews graduated from the University of Florida with a bachelor's degree in therapeutic recreation in 1986, and thereafter, from Ohio State University with a master's degree in clinical social work. From 1992 to 1999, she worked as a clinical social worker in children's hematology and cancer treatment at the University of Virginia Health Science Center. Andrews has worked for MBNA America and Bank of America since 1999; as a Bank of America vice president and market manager for consumer banking, she oversees fifteen banking centers in Delaware and Pennsylvania.

Andrews delivers motivational speeches for corporations, conferences, community groups and schools, usually on the topics of individual potential and the importance of teamwork in achieving goals, and drawing on the values of the Olympic movement. She is a member of the U.S. Olympic Committee, and has served as a volunteer for the U.S. Olympic Alumni Association since 2004. She is also a veteran celebrity swimmer for Swim Across America (SAA), a charitable organization that uses former Olympic swimmers to raise funds for cancer research, and has participated in SAA events for nine years.

Andrews was inducted into the Maryland Swimming Hall of Fame as an "Honor Athlete" in 1987. In 2008, she received the NCAA's Silver Anniversary Award, which recognizes successful former student-athletes who have excelled in their careers after graduation.

== See also ==
- List of multiple Olympic gold medalists
- List of Ohio State University people
- List of Olympic medalists in swimming (women)
- List of University of Florida alumni
- List of University of Florida Olympians
