= Peter MacGowan =

Canadian rower

Personal information
- Born: 26 November 1958 (age 67) Toronto, Ontario, Canada

Sport
- Sport: Rowing

Peter MacGowan (born 26 November 1958) is a Canadian rower. He competed in the men's double sculls event at the 1984 Summer Olympics.
