= Constantin Postoiu =

Romanian rower

Personal information
- Nationality: Romanian
- Born: 13 October 1959 (age 65); Sudiți, Romania

Sport
- Sport: Rowing

Constantin Postoiu (born 13 October 1959) is a Romanian rower. He competed in the men's coxless pair event at the 1980 Summer Olympics.
