= Jean-Claude Roussel =

French rower

Personal information
- Nationality: French
- Born: 22 July 1957 (age 67)

Sport
- Sport: Rowing

Jean-Claude Roussel (born 22 July 1957) is a French rower. He competed in the men's coxless pair event at the 1980 Summer Olympics.
