= Sudiți, Ialomița =

Sudiți
- Commune
- Location in Ialomița County

- Location in Romania
- Coordinates: 44°34′14″N 27°34′04″E
- Country: Romania
- County: Ialomița

Government
  - Mayor (2024–2028): Vasile Șincan (PSD)
- Area: 58.7 km^{2} (22.7 sq mi)
- Elevation: 17 m (56 ft)
- Population (2021-12-01): 1,738
  - Density: 29.6/km^{2} (76.7/sq mi)
- Time zone: UTC+02:00 (EET)
  - Summer (DST): UTC+03:00 (EEST)
- Postal code: 927235
- Area code: +(40) 243
- Vehicle reg.: IL
- Website: primariasuditi.ro

Sudiți is a commune located in Ialomița County, Muntenia, Romania. It is composed of two villages, Gura Văii and Sudiți.

Historical population
Year	Pop.	±%
1899	2,390	—
1925	2,610	+9.2%
2002	2,302	−11.8%
2011	2,026	−12.0%
2021	1,738	−14.2%
Source: Census data

== Natives ==
- Constantin Postoiu (born 1959), rower
