= Pat Gannon =

Irish rower

Personal information
- Nationality: Irish
- Born: 25 September 1958 (age 66)

Sport
- Sport: Rowing

Pat Gannon (born 25 September 1958) is an Irish rower. He competed in the men's coxless pair event at the 1980 Summer Olympics.
