= Georgios Kourkoumbas =

Greek rower (born 1958)

Personal information
- Nationality: Greek
- Born: 15 August 1958 (age 66)

Sport
- Sport: Rowing

Georgios Kourkoumbas (born 15 August 1958) is a Greek rower. He competed in the men's coxless pair event at the 1980 Summer Olympics.
