= KKK Vojvodina =

Serbian kayak and canoe club

- Location: Sunčani kej 13, Novi Sad, Vojvodina, Serbia
- Coordinates: 45.2385067°N 19.8502383°E
- Home water: Danube River
- Founded: 1947; 79 years ago
- Key people: Bora Sibinkić (President) Peða Tatar (Administrative assistant)
- Website: www.kajakkanuklubvojvodina.com

Kajak kanu klub Vojvodina (Serbian Cyrillic: Кајак кану клуб Војводина) is a Serbian kayak and canoe club from Novi Sad, Vojvodina, Serbia. The club was founded in 1947 with the name USKOK. After joining SD Vojvodina in 1983, they would change their name to the current one.

== Location ==
Since its founding, the club has been located on the Danube, at Sunčani kej 13, next to the city beach Štrand, rowing club Danubius 1885, restaurant Cesla and the Novi Sad quay.

== History ==
Since its founding, the club had members that competed in world championships and Olympic games, as well as holders of countless titles in Republic, Federal, and Balkan competitions. The club works by relying on the knowledge and overreach of its own members.

In the early 2010s, the club reorganized its works by introducing coaches for certain categories of contestants: kayak school, pioneer, cadets, junior, young seniors and seniors. In this field, the work of Aleksandar Petrović, Milan Ćirić, Milenko Našagaćin, who in recent years with a team of club seniors, has achieved great successes in national and world championships.

In January 2023, the city unveiled plans to expand the Štrand beach downstream and refurbish the beach area with more entertainment options and accommodations, moving the rowing club Danubius 1885, kayak canoe club Vojvodina and restaurant Cesla to Kamenica Island upstream. The realization of this plan will not start until these locals are moved to their new locations.

== Notable members ==
Some of the most remarkable athletes that have represented the KKK Vojvodina since its inception were:

- Vladimir Torubarov (1993 -)
- Milica Novaković (1988 -)
- Milan Ciric (1980 -)
- Antonija Nađ (1986 -)
- Bora Sibinkić (1978 -)
- Petar Sibinkić (1976 -)
