= Alberik de Suremain =

Guatemalan rower (born 1950)

Personal information
- Nationality: Guatemalan
- Born: 19 August 1950 (age 75)

Sport
- Sport: Rowing

Alberik de Suremain (born 19 August 1950) is a Guatemalan rower. He competed in the men's coxless pair event at the 1980 Summer Olympics.
