= José Pardas =

Spanish rower

Personal information
- Nationality: Spanish
- Born: 25 June 1955 (age 69)

Sport
- Sport: Rowing

José Pardas (born 25 June 1955) is a Spanish rower. He competed in the men's coxless pair event at the 1980 Summer Olympics.
