= Markus Conrad =

- Born: 1959 or 1960 (age 66–67)
- Education: Hamburg University; INSEAD
- Title: CEO, Tchibo
- Term: 2006-16
- Successor: Thomas Linemayr

Markus Conrad (born 1959 or 1960) is a German businessman, the chief executive officer (CEO) of Tchibo, a German chain of coffee retailers and cafés from 2006 to 2016.

Conrad studied business management and music at Hamburg University, followed by an MBA at INSEAD, Fontainebleau, France, and received a PhD in economics from Hamburg University in 1987.

Conrad joined Bain & Company in 1985, becoming a partner in 1989. From 1990 to 2005 he was CEO at Libri GmbH, a German book wholesaler.

Conrad was appointed CEO of Tchibo in 2006, a position he held until 2016, when he was succeeded by Thomas Linemayr.
