= Liberty Bridge, Novi Sad =

Bridge in Novi Sad, Vojvodina, Serbia

Liberty Bridge Мост слободе Most slobode
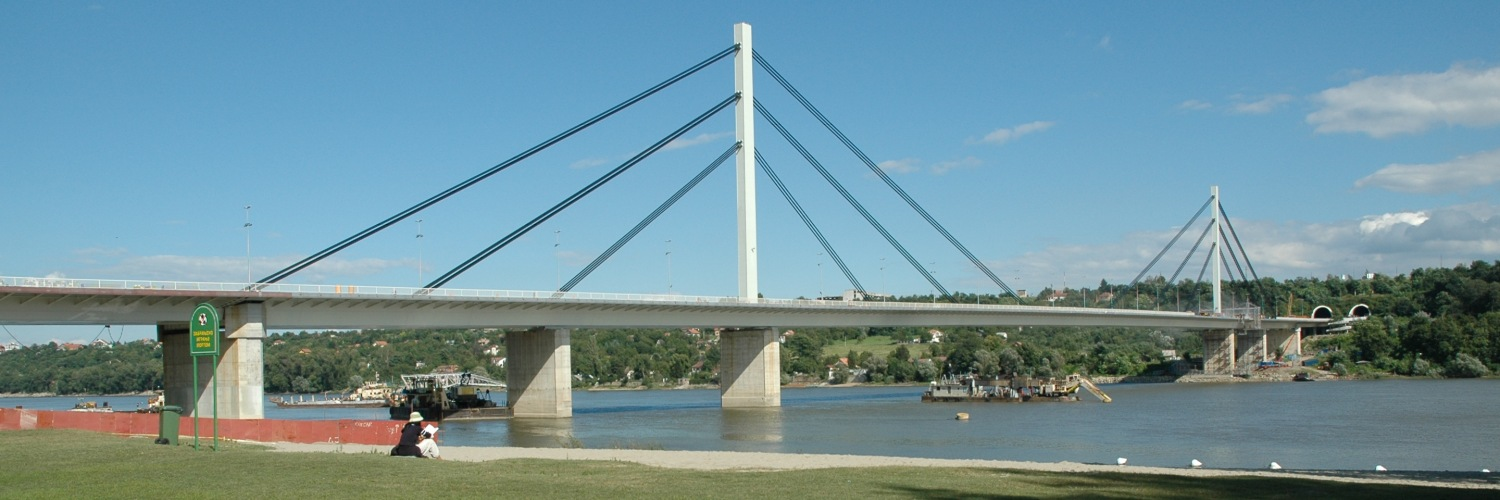
- Liberty Bridge in Novi Sad, August 2005
- Coordinates: 45°13′58″N 19°50′56″E
- Carried: 6 lane car traffic, 2 bicycle and pedestrian walkways
- Crossed: Danube
- Locale: Novi Sad, Vojvodina, Serbia
- Official name: Liberty Bridge
- Preceded by: Ilok–Bačka Palanka Bridge
- Followed by: Varadin Bridge

Characteristics
- Design: Cable-stayed bridge, harp design, single arrangement, cable-stayed cradle-system
- Material: Steel rope, concrete pylons
- Total length: 1,312 m
- Width: 27.60 m
- Traversable?: Yes
- Longest span: 351 m
- Piers in water: 3
- No. of lanes: 4

History
- Designer: Nikola Hajdin
- Engineering design by: Gojko Nenadović; Predrag Želalić
- Construction start: 2 September 1975; 49 years ago (Old bridge); 2003; 22 years ago (New bridge)
- Construction end: 1981; 44 years ago (Old bridge); 2005; 20 years ago (New bridge)
- Opened: 23 October 1981; 43 years ago (Old bridge); 7 October 2005; 19 years ago (New bridge)
- Collapsed: 3 April 1999

Liberty Bridge (Serbian: Мост слободе, romanized: Most slobode) is a cable-stayed bridge on the Danube river in Novi Sad, Vojvodina, Serbia. The bridge was opened for traffic on 23 October 1981. During that time, the bridge was the world record holder in the category of bridges with cable-stayed design. It was destroyed during NATO bombardment on 3 April 1999. It was rebuilt from 2003 to 2005 and reopened on 7 October 2005.

== Name ==
The name Liberty Bridge was given during the first opening of the bridge on 23 October 1981 as it was opened during the 37th anniversary of the liberation of Novi Sad in World War II.

== Location ==
Liberty Bridge is the most upstream Novi Sad bridge over the Danube river within the urban area. It connects the Bačka and Srem sides of the City of Novi Sad, specifically Novi Sad and Sremska Kamenica. It connects Novi Sad with State Road 21, which goes through Fruška Gora to Ruma, A3 motorway, and western Serbia.

== History ==
=== Liberty Bridge from 1975–1999 ===
The strong economic development of Novi Sad during the 1960s and 1970s created the conditions for the city to gradually expand to the Srem side (the area of Mišeluk and further up the slopes of Fruška gora). This required the city authorities, and above all the city planners, to start creating framework urban conditions for building a bridge and relieving traffic from the city centre.

The first such conditions were created by the Novi Sad Urban Institute in 1970. The Novi Sad Municipal Assembly decides on the construction of the bridge in December 1973. The architects of the bridge were academics Nikola Hajdin, Gojko Nenadić and Predrag Želalić.

Work began on 22 September 1976, when the first pier on the left bank of the Danube was stabbed. During the construction, the attention of the experts was focused on three details: The construction of the bars for pillar 17, where there were traces of land slides; the assembly of the steel structure, in pieces, weighing 200 tonnes, without scaffolding, with the help of the Derrick cranes; and the assembly of the steel ropes, which was original.

Everything was done perfectly, with a deviation of only 13 millimetres, between two parts of the structure, when the last central construction of the bridge was put in place.

The bridge was inaugurated for traffic on 23 October 1981, with the presence of tens of thousands of citizens.

On 3 April 1999, at 7:55 pm local time, a rocket struck the Liberty Bridge during the NATO bombing campaign against Yugoslavia. Although the bridge gradually collapsed into the Danube River, there were no deaths thanks to a local fisherman named Velimir Teodorović who rescued nine civilians from the destroyed bridge.

=== Rebuilding ===
Rebuilding the bridge cost the city of Novi Sad 40 million euros and lasted for 2 years and 22 days. Maja Gojković, at the time mayor of Novi Sad, reopened it on 7 October 2005. The official reopening was held a few days later, with officials from the European Agency for Reconstruction present.

The bridge's reconstruction and opening was a cause for political clashes; one side saying Novi Sad and its citizens should be thankful to EU for the gift of the reconstructed bridge, and the other that EU was obliged to reconstruct it anyway, as a part of war damages compensation.

== Gallery ==
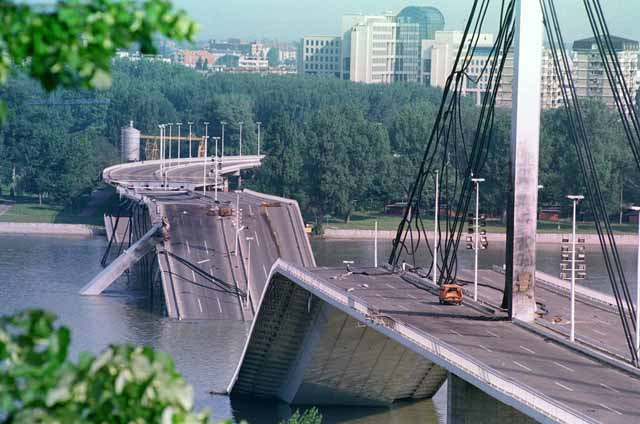
Destroyed Liberty Bridge, 1999

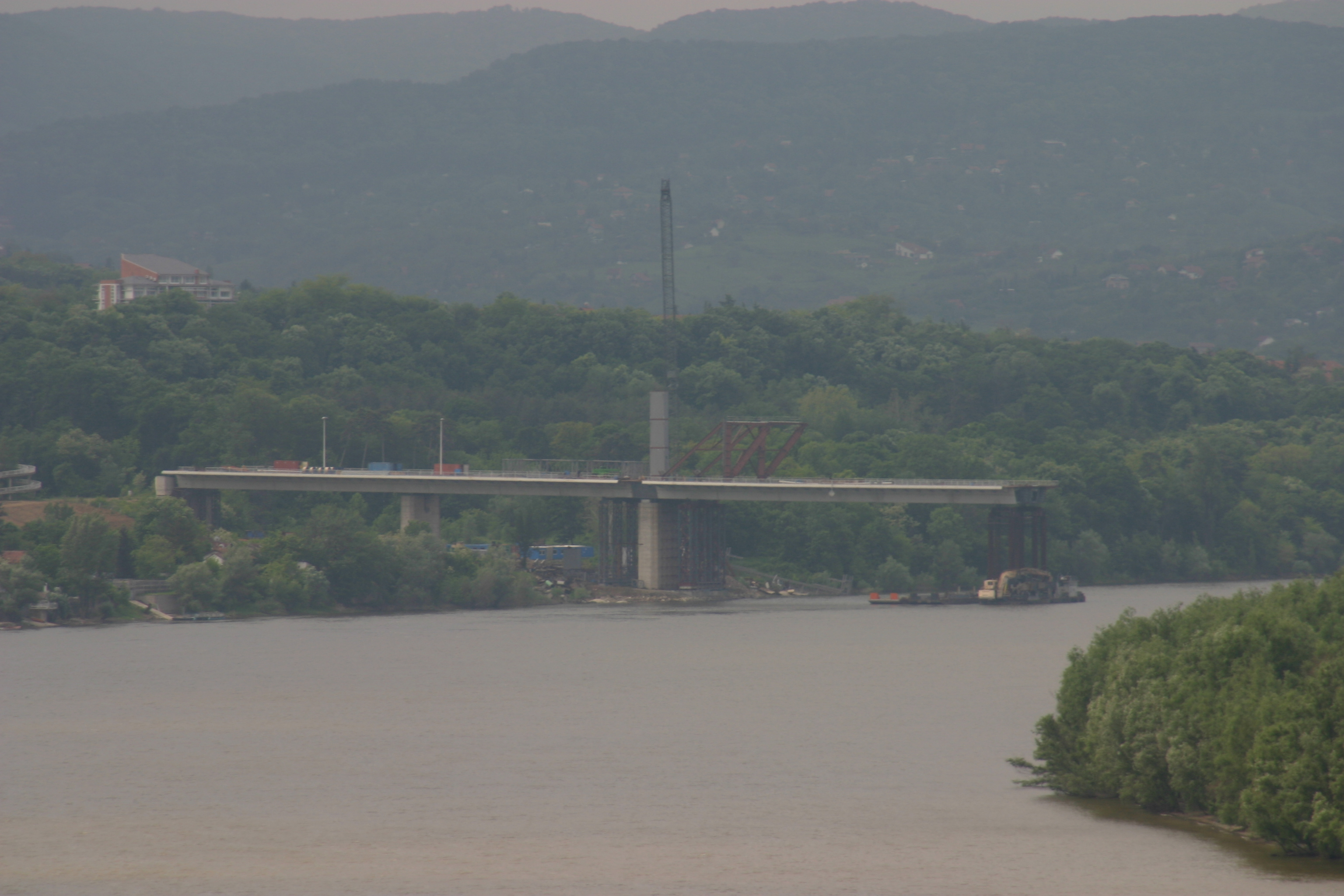
Rebuilding of the Liberty Bridge, 2003–2005

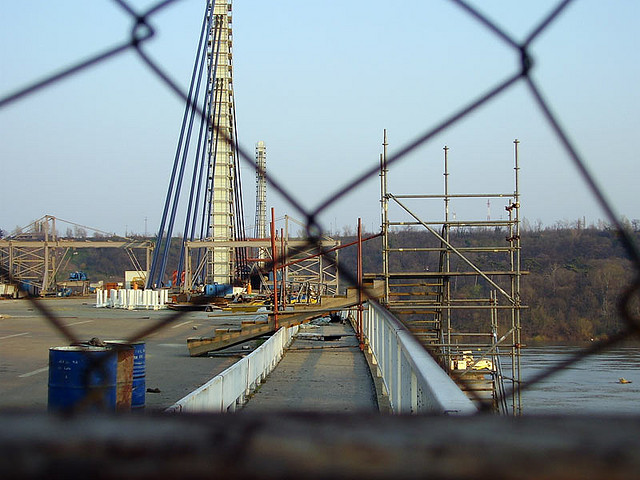
Rebuilding of the Liberty Bridge, 2003–2005

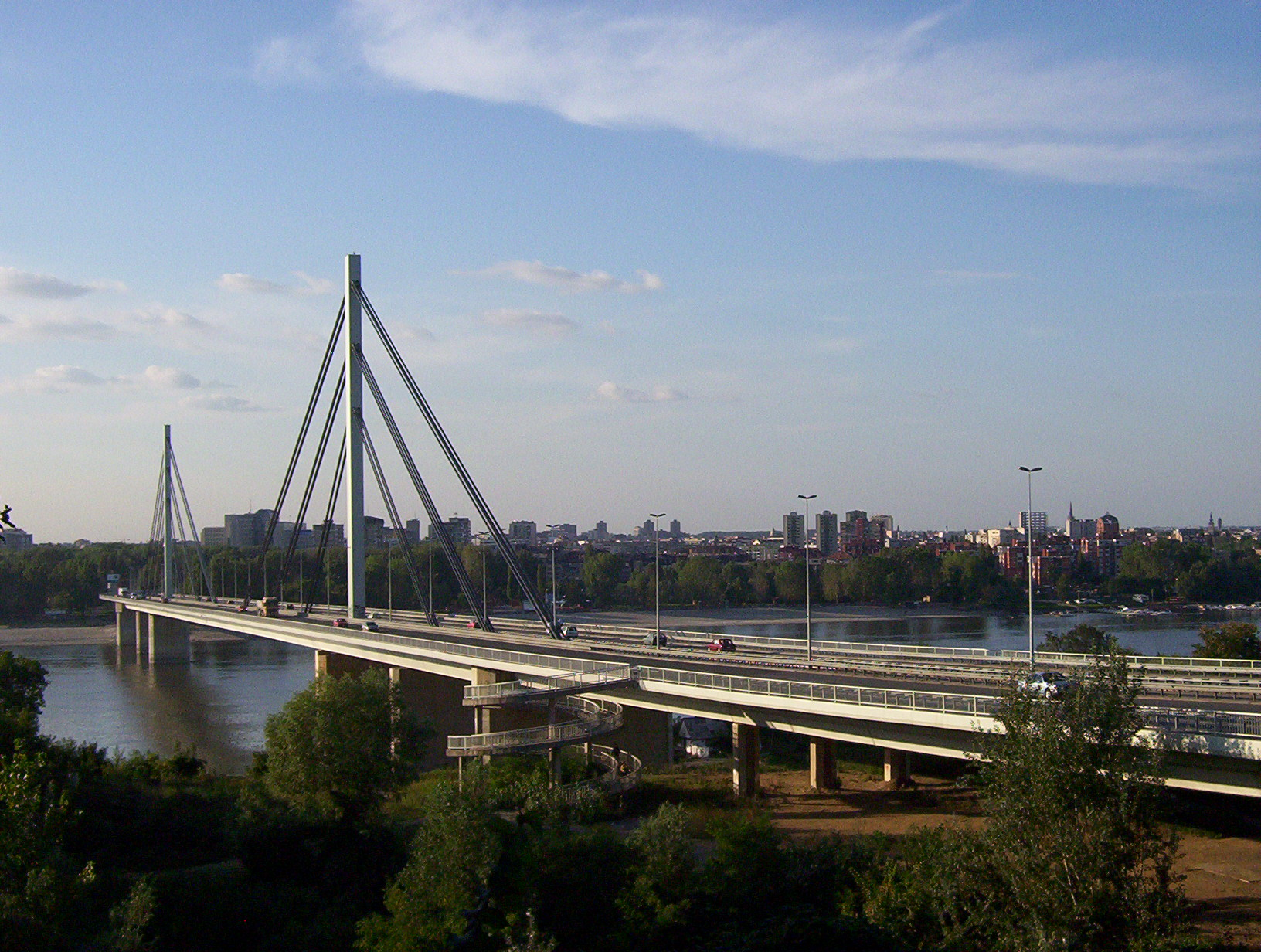
Liberty Bridge from Sremska Kamenica, September 2006

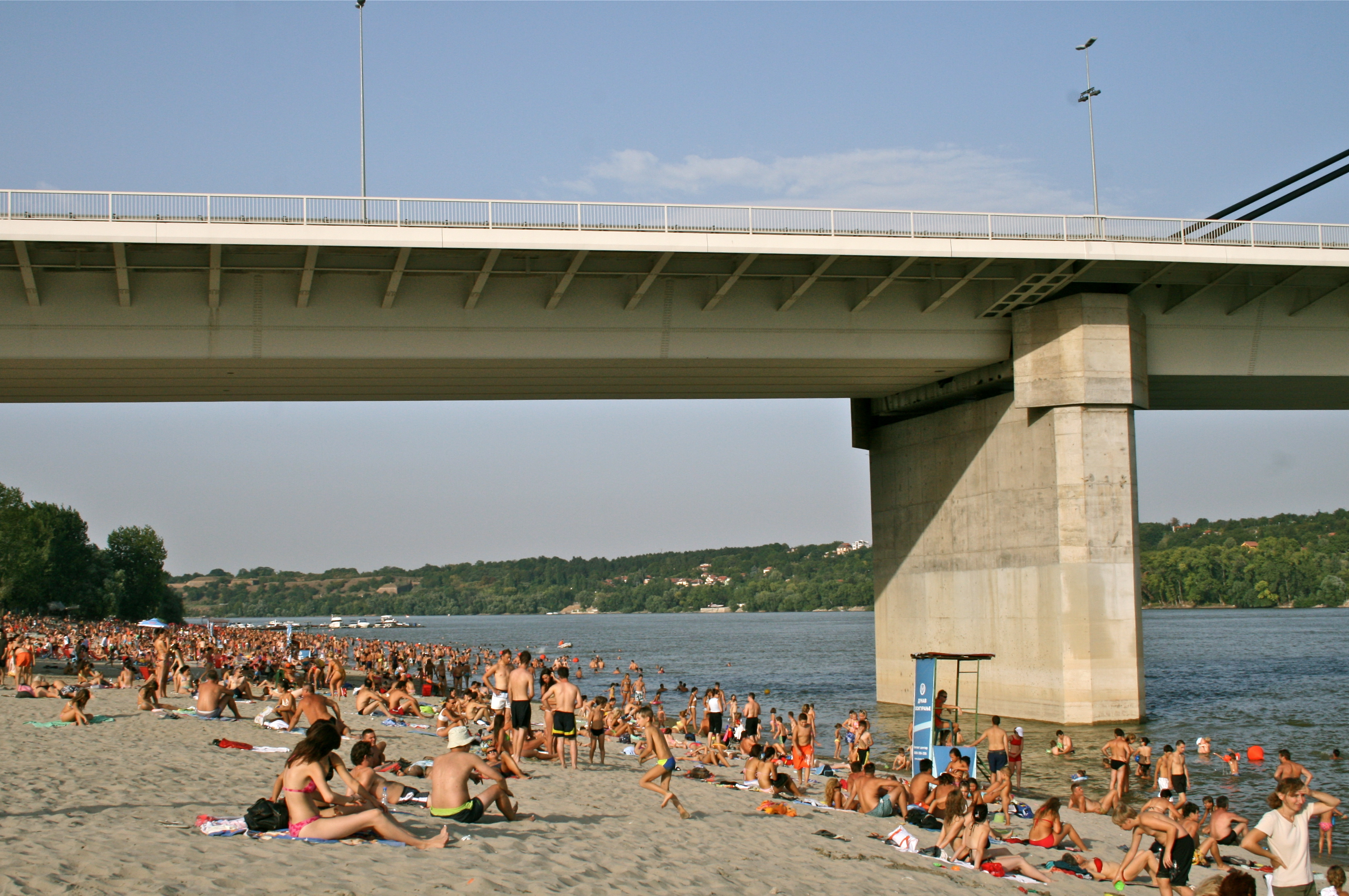
Liberty Bridge from Štrand, August 2008

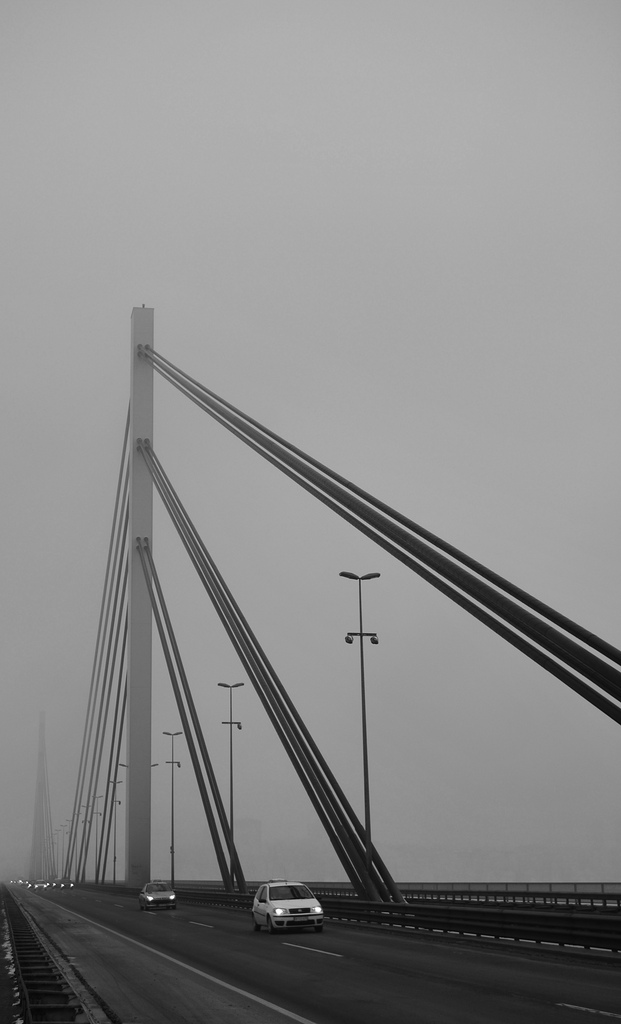
Bridge′s cables and towers, December 2010

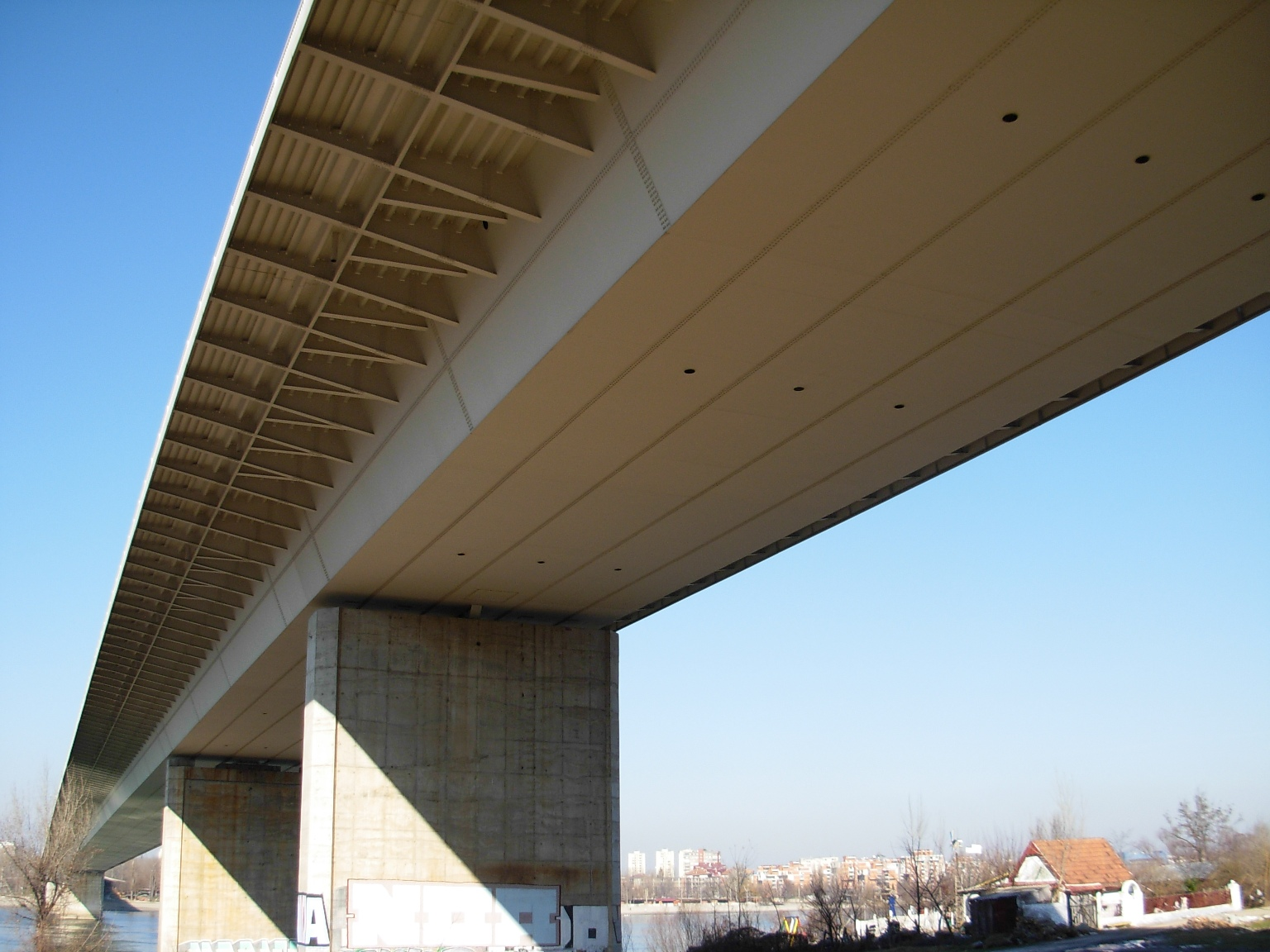
River shore passing beneath the bridge in Sremska Kamenica, February 2011

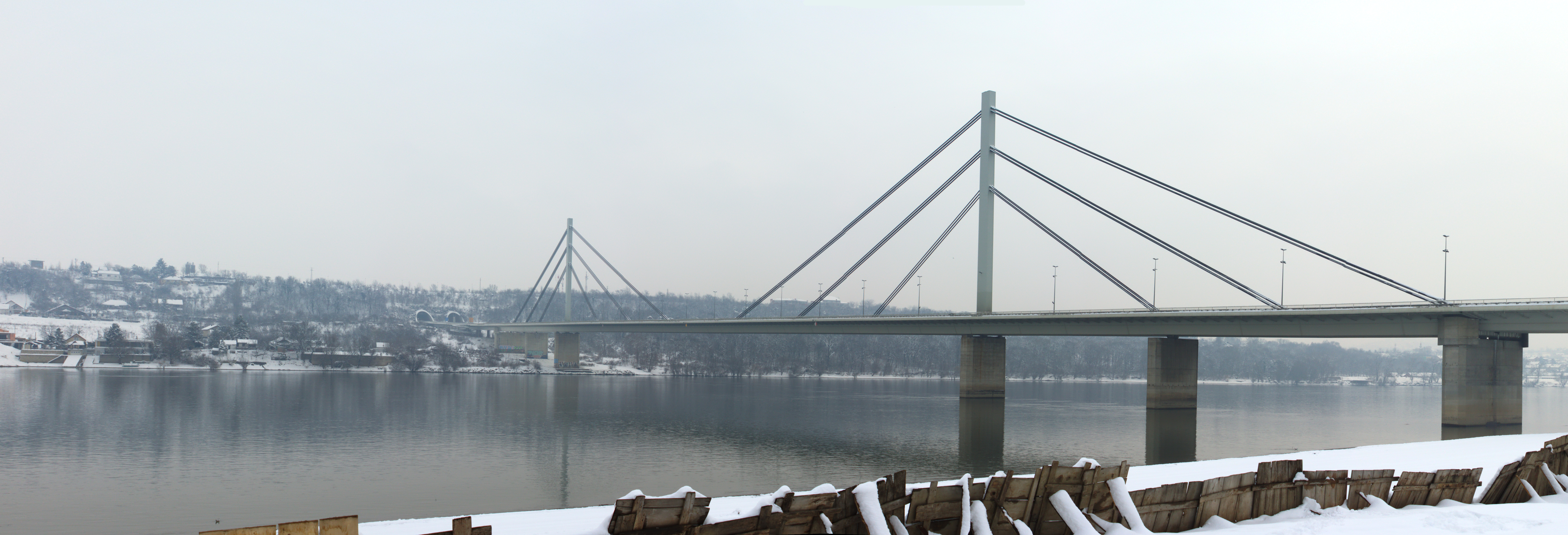
Liberty Bridge during winter, February 2011

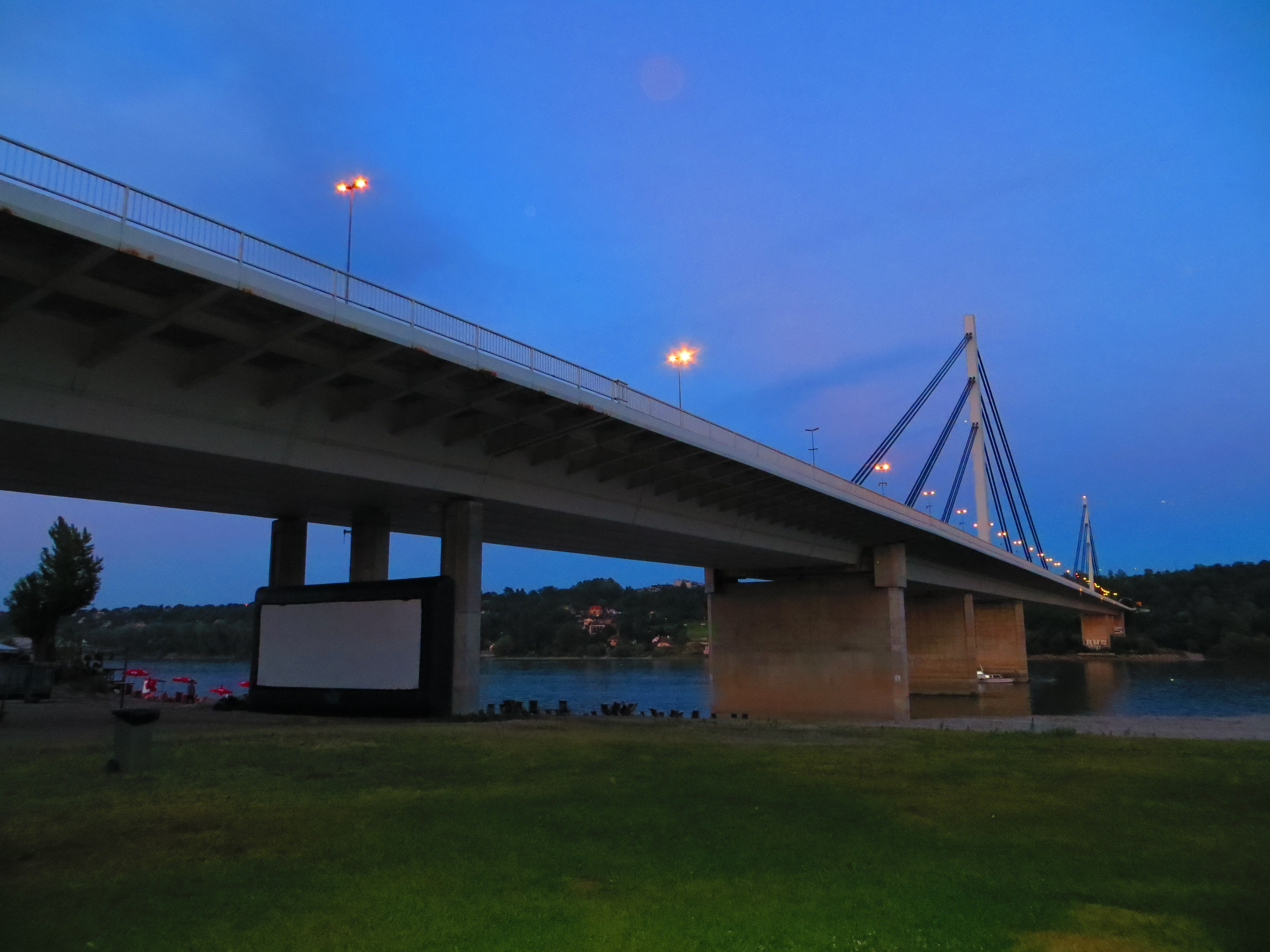
Liberty Bridge during night from Štrand, July 2014

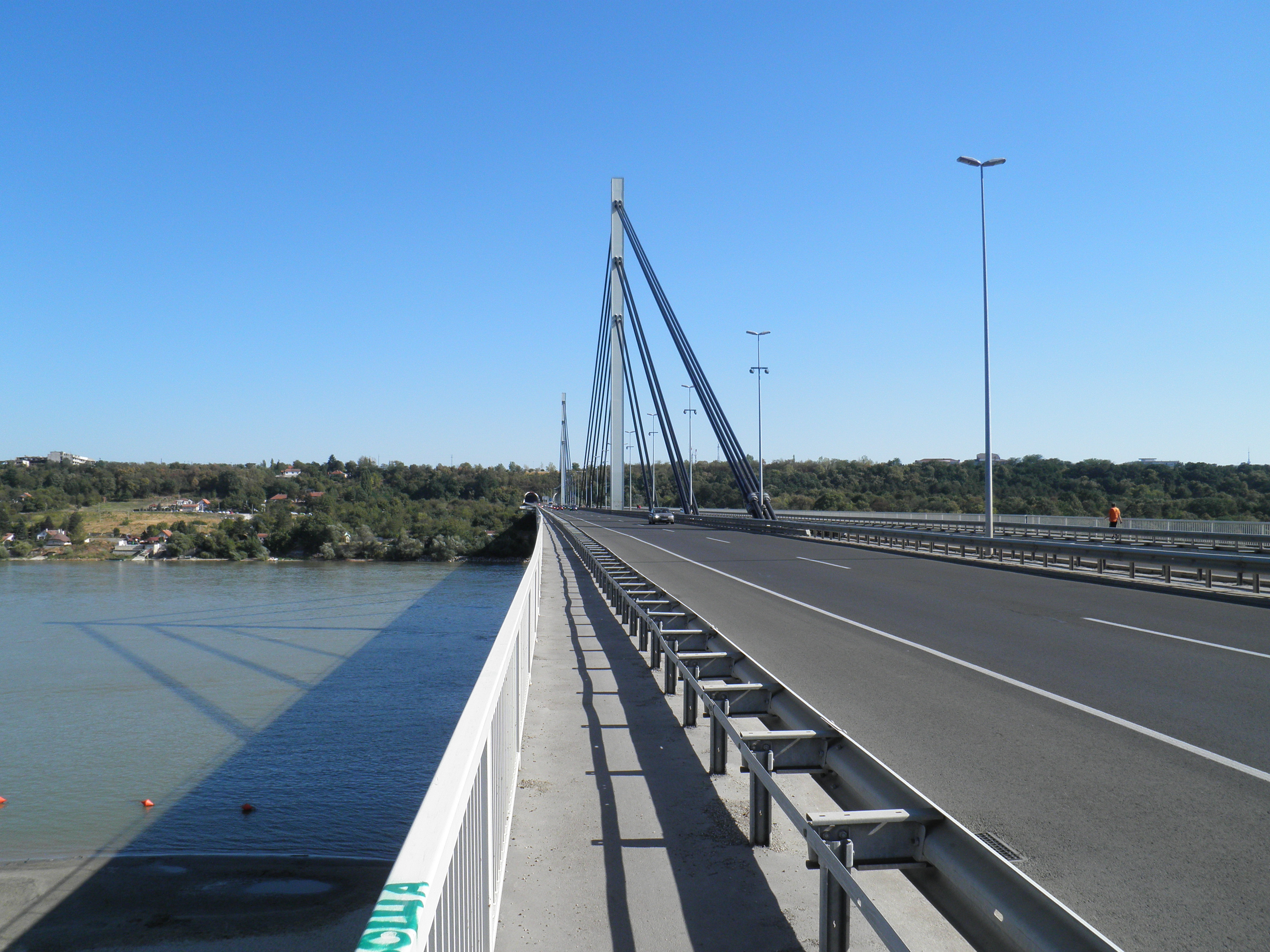
Road and Pedestrian walkway on the bridge, September 2012

== See also ==
- List of bridges in Serbia
- List of crossings of the Danube
