= Robert Lang (rower) =

Australian rower

Personal information
- Nationality: Australian
- Born: 18 April 1955 (age 69)

Sport
- Sport: Rowing

Robert Lang (born 18 April 1955) is an Australian rower. He competed in the men's coxless pair event at the 1980 Summer Olympics.
