= Andreas Schmelz =

German rower

Medal record

Men's rowing

Representing West Germany

World Rowing Championships
Silver medal – second place	1987 Copenhagen	M2x
Bronze medal – third place	1983 Duisburg	M2x

Andreas Schmelz (born 8 December 1960 in Düsseldorf) was a West German rower. Together with Georg Agrikola he finished fourth in the double scull at the 1984 Summer Olympics.
