= Tim Storm (rower) =

Canadian rower

Personal information
- Nationality: Canadian
- Born: July 19, 1956 (age 70) Rotterdam, Netherlands

Sport
- Sport: Rowing

Tim Storm (born July 19, 1956) is a Canadian rower. He competed in the men's double sculls event at the 1984 Summer Olympics.
