= Nikolaos Ioannidis (rower) =

Greek rower (born 1960)

Personal information
- Nationality: Greek
- Born: 28 May 1960 (age 64)

Sport
- Sport: Rowing

Nikolaos Ioannidis (born 28 May 1960) is a Greek rower. He competed in the men's coxless pair event at the 1980 Summer Olympics.
