= Franco Valtorta =

Italian rower

Personal information
- Nationality: Italian
- Born: 4 August 1956 (age 68); Milan, Italy

Sport
- Sport: Rowing

Franco Valtorta (born 4 August 1956) is an Italian rower. He competed in the men's coxless pair event at the 1980 Summer Olympics.
