= Urs Steinemann =

Swiss rower

Personal information
- Nationality: Swiss
- Born: 1 February 1959 (age 66)

Sport
- Sport: Rowing

Urs Steinemann (born 1 February 1959) is a Swiss rower. He competed in the men's double sculls event at the 1984 Summer Olympics.
