= Armando Chávez (rower) =

Mexican rower (born 1955)

Armando Chávez Sr.
Personal information
- Nationality: Mexican
- Born: 22 July 1955 (age 69)
- Height: 190 cm (6 ft 3 in)
- Weight: 86 kg (190 lb)

Sport
- Sport: Rowing

Armando Chávez Sr. (born 22 July 1955) is a Mexican rower. He competed in the men's double sculls event at the 1984 Summer Olympics. His son followed in his footsteps to take up rowing.
