= Francesco Esposito =

Italian rower

Personal information
- Born: 4 March 1955 (age 71)
- Height: 170 cm (5 ft 7 in)
- Weight: 71 kg (157 lb)

Sport
- Sport: Rowing
Medal record
Men's rowing
Representing Italy
World Rowing Championships
Gold medal – first place	1980 Hazewinkel	LM2x
Gold medal – first place	1981 Munich	LM2x

Francesco Esposito (born 4 March 1955) is a multiple world championship rower from Italy. He competed at the 1984 Summer Olympics held at Lake Casitas in the United States, where he came fifth with Ruggero Verroca in the double sculls. He was one of three recipients of the Thomas Keller Medal in 1996.
