= Petra Bekaert =

Dutch swimmer (born 1967)

Personal information
- Born: 28 September 1967 (age 58)

Sport
- Sport: Swimming

Petra Bekaert (born 28 September 1967) is a swimmer who represented the Netherlands Antilles. She competed in the women's 100 metre backstroke at the 1984 Summer Olympics.
