= Štrand =

Beach on the Danube in Novi Sad, Serbia

Štrand Штранд
- Beach
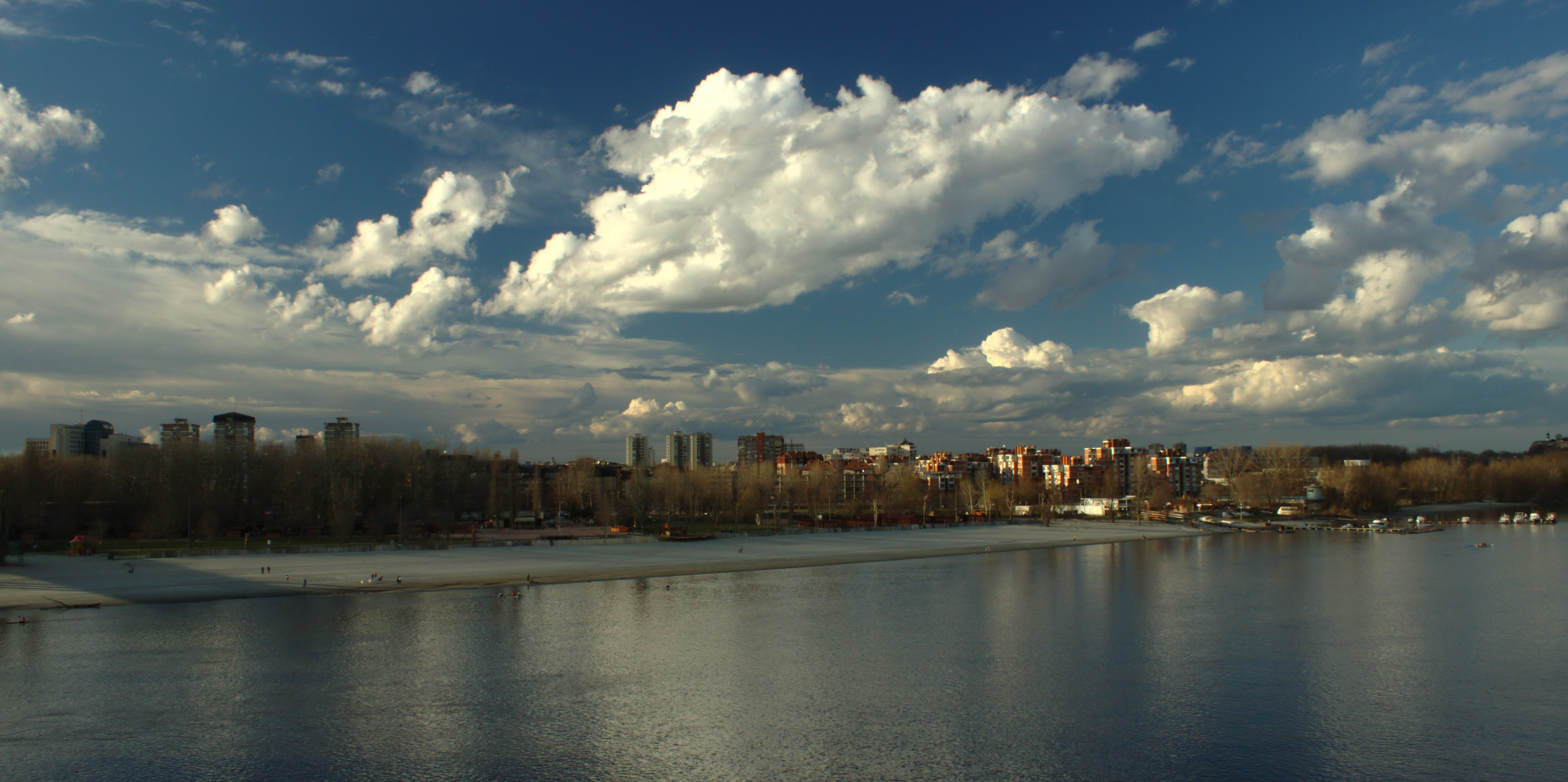
- Štrand - Beach on the Danube River as seen from the Liberty Bridge

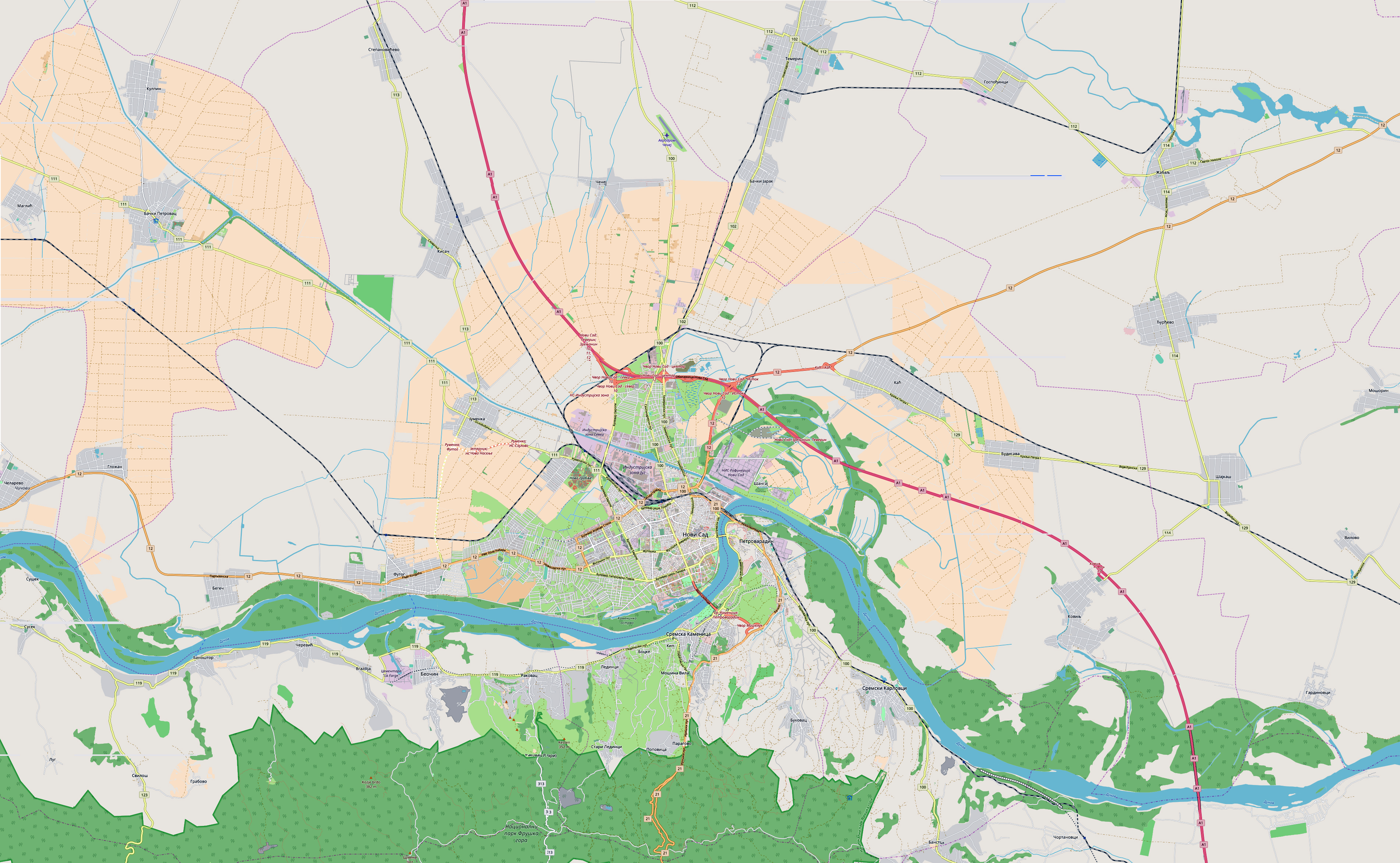
- Location within Novi Sad
- Coordinates: 45°14′10″N 19°50′53″E
- Location: Novi Sad, Serbia
- Water bodies: Danube

Dimensions
  - Length: 700 m (2,300 ft)

Štrand (Serbian Cyrillic: Штранд) is a popular city beach on the Danube river in Novi Sad, Vojvodina, Serbia. It is located and the edge of Liman neighborhood, with the Liberty Bridge passing above the beach.

== Name ==
Its name derives from the German word Strand, meaning simply beach (In German, an initial s is usually pronounced as sh when it comes before the consonants t or p, as in the Yiddish-English shtick, thus, the Serbian š correctly bears a diacritic reflecting this).

== History ==
=== First Beaches in Novi Sad ===
The first written proof of the local beach lovers of Novi Sad dates back to 1827, recorded by fisherman Jakov Rajs. During that period, there were beaches on the Srem side, so the local fishermen had to transport those who wanted to visit the beach to the other bank of the Danube, taking the opportunity to sell some crayfish to the swimmers.

The first Novi Sad beach was located right next to Brukšanac (Bruckschanc) Bridgehead, part of the Petrovaradin Fortress that was demolished in the 1920s. However, having lots of whirlpools, the Danube was fast and not great for swimming, so the citizens of Novi Sad looked for a better location. They found one just one and a half kilometres upstream, near the Fisherman’s Island.

=== Origin of Štrand ===
Štrand opened its doors to people officially in 1911, but the locals had been using the beach long before that. In the middle of the 19th century, there was a sandbar on the left bank of the Danube, which the locals called Poloj or Pojilo. The sandbar was used as a watering place for domestic animals. As Novi Sad grew bigger, so did the need for a big and arranged beach. Of all locations, Poloj was most suitable due to its woody terrain which gave enough space for kids, men and women to have separate swimming spots. The first swimmers at Poloj date back to 1856, when a theft was reported, with someone stealing the visitors’ belongings which laid on the bank.

Poloj was soon after changed into Štenglova dunavska kupališta (The Štengl Danube Baths), the so-called Schwimmschulen, meaning swimming school in German. On the Danube, there was a huge wooden raft with sheet metal barrels tied to strong boulders. There were 100 cabins and three double pools on the raft, with separate sections for men and women. The biggest pool dimensions were 20×10 metres, with swimming exhibitions being held there. The second pool was intended for non-swimmers, while the third one was for the kids. Swimming teachers kept children floating on the water with the help of a rope and floating sticks. The swimming season at the schwimmschule started on 15 May and lasted until September.

Those who couldn’t afford schwimmschule sought refreshment at the numerous wild beaches.

Novi Sad published the technical description of Štrand in 1912, and since then, the 500 meter-long and 60 meter-wide coast has been called by the name ‘Štrand.’ One year later, the joint-stock company of Štrand took on the obligation of developing the beach. The quality of the beach itself developed rapidly, as well as the number of services available to visitors. That summer, three more rows of wooden cabins were built, including kiosks, a hair salon, a juice shop and an ice cream parlour where you could buy the very popular cake called Polar, or the amerikan korneta (American cone), made by Imre Haker in Jevrejska ulica (Jewish Street).

=== Expansions ===
Štrand had got its ticket office at the main entrance in 1920, as well as rooms for police officers on duty and emergency care, bike racks, showers, gazebos, trampolines, inflatable bouncers, ties for renting ships, pavilions for military music and a large wooden restaurant.

The beach cared about maintaining greenery and dense trees, it offered great comfort and enviable impression of elegance. Owning a cabin at the beach or buying tickets in advance was something only wealthier citizens could afford. The cabins were arranged in three rows, and those in the first line, with tables and benches, were the most expensive. Each row was taken care of by a cleaning lady who kept a little table with keys of the cabins she was responsible for. The cleaning ladies maintained order and hygiene, and would even bring a bucket of water where people would wash their feet before leaving the beach; and they were given tips for that. The exclusive first and less prestigious second row of cabins were separated by a series of masonry stoves and pump wells. Some visitors cooked and heated their meals on the stoves, while they cooled bottles of white coffee and watermelons next to the well. The testimony to the legendary integrity of Novi Sad people is the incredible fact that nothing was ever stolen, not one watermelon nor a bottle of coffee.

In 1930, Štrand was around 700 metres long, 60 metres wide and had 70 cabins. It was estimated it could host around 10.000 visitors. However, the number of people living in Novi Sad back then was hardly 40 thousand people. Prominent poets, politicians, writers, artists and visitors of this city often visited Štrand. Miloš Crnjanski spoke of Štrand as the most important landmark of Novi Sad.

There was a nice wooden restaurant people enjoyed eating in, until it got destroyed in the fire in 1964. All of the objects, including the restaurant, were made out of wood. The next year, in 1956, the Danube flooded and destroyed everything. That year, Štrand looked the same as it looked at the beginning of the 20th century.

Between 29 June and 24 October 2000, a student movement that would later grow into Exit spanned from the University park all the way to Štrand. Years after, Štrand would become the most visited city beach for festival goers, with official camping areas set up within Štrand during the festival.

During the summer, Štrand has around 20,000 visitors daily. The swimming season lasts from the middle of May or early June and lasts until the end of September or early October. During that period, beach goers are required to buy beach entrance tickets between 8 in the morning and 8 in the evening.

In January 2023, the city unveiled plans to expand the Štrand beach downstream and refurbish the beach area with more entertainment options and accommodations, moving the rowing club Danubius 1885, kayak canoe club "Vojvodina" and restaurant "Cesla" to Kamenica Island upstream. The plan encompasses 11.71 hectares of new restaurants, bars, water facilities, as well as new sports grounds along with other mobile and infrastructure equipment. This also includes a free WiFi zone for beach goers, a second beach entrance, mini golf field, and kids playground. The sports area would include a new beach volleyball terrain and a multipurpose terrain for basketball and volleyball, as well as a terrain for badminton, and an open air gym. The new pool for kids, would be a pontoon pool located at the eastern end of the beach, close to Kamenička Ada. The area will also have a water course with many water related activities and equipment for children.

=== Novi Sad Raid ===
On 21 January 1942, Hungarian fascist forces started a pogrom against Serbian and Jewish citizens of Novi Sad. Between 1300 and 2000 citizens were killed in three days. Arrested citizens, by truck or by foot, were brought at the very entrance of Štrand. Lined up in rows, they waited to go to the very banks of the Danube, where they were killed and wounded. The lifeless and wounded bodies were pushed under the ice.

=== NATO Bombing of Novi Sad ===
With the construction of the Liberty Bridge in 1981, the bridge would pass above the beach, visually splitting the beach into two areas. The 1999 NATO bombing would result in the bridge's destruction, scattering debris across the beach area. For several years beachgoers were advised not to swim too far from the shores of Štrand, due to the bombs that were dropped on and near the bridge, the debris within the Danube, and the structural instability of the bridge's remains.

== Fashion ==
During the period between both World wars, a great deal of attention was paid to public morality, visitors had to comply with regulations and restrictions mostly regarding dressing, or rather undressing. A strict police officer was in charge of these rules; he used to measure the length of women’s skirts on their bathing suits, but also forbid men from being overly underdressed.

The length of skirts and low necklines were strictly regulated, whereas men had to wear swimming trunks with an upper part too. Showing skin wasn’t so popular until the Second World War. When you bought a ticket, you would get a swimsuit as well, but most girls brought their own. These Puritan criteria were lowered over time, so that the gentlemen first tolerated unbuttoning one strap, and later wearing swimming trunks that were not too cut. Of course, even in strict times like that, one found ways to have fun and flirt. At first, some didn’t like the awkward moment of ladies swimming together with men, which would eventually stop being an issue. However, some rules regarding maintaining order and ethics stuck for a long time. Everyone had to obey the strict rules, thus, any woman with bare breasts was banned from the beach for life.

Today, nudity is still banned from the beach, with modern beachwear following common decency guidelines.

== Sports ==
Ever since it was founded, Štrand is famous for its diverse sport activities, such as picigin (citizens of Novi Sad like to say the game originated at the Štrand beach), kečket – tennis played using only bare hands, kurendol – tennis played using feet, and lastly – tennis played using heads, which emerged on the Danube banks.

== Transportation ==
Historically, the most common ways to arrive at the beach were by walking, bikes, carriages, boats, and trams (later on motors, cars, and buses).

Trčika, a small electric tram with three wagons was getting people to Štrand for years. Yellow electric trams appeared on the streets of Novi Sad on 30 September 1911, when they replaced the omnibuses pulled by horses. On 30 September 1958, the trams were replaced by buses. Trčika’s first stop was in Železnička Street, and the last one was in front of Štrand. It was usually used by the more wealthier citizens.

Bike racks are located in front of the Štrand beach, stretching all the way from Fruškogorska Street to the Štrand’s main entrance, which was enough space for around 2 or 3 thousand bikes. NS bike, a local bike renting service company, has its own bike rack area near the entrance of the beach.

Cars can arrive from Fruškogorska Street and Despot Stefan Boulevard, with several available parking lots (Parkiralište Štrand being the largest and closest to the beach).

JGSP Novi Sad public bus transportation has several urban lines (1,1Z,7B,8) that stop near the modern entrance of Štrand, serving also as the endpoint for those bus lines.

== Gallery ==
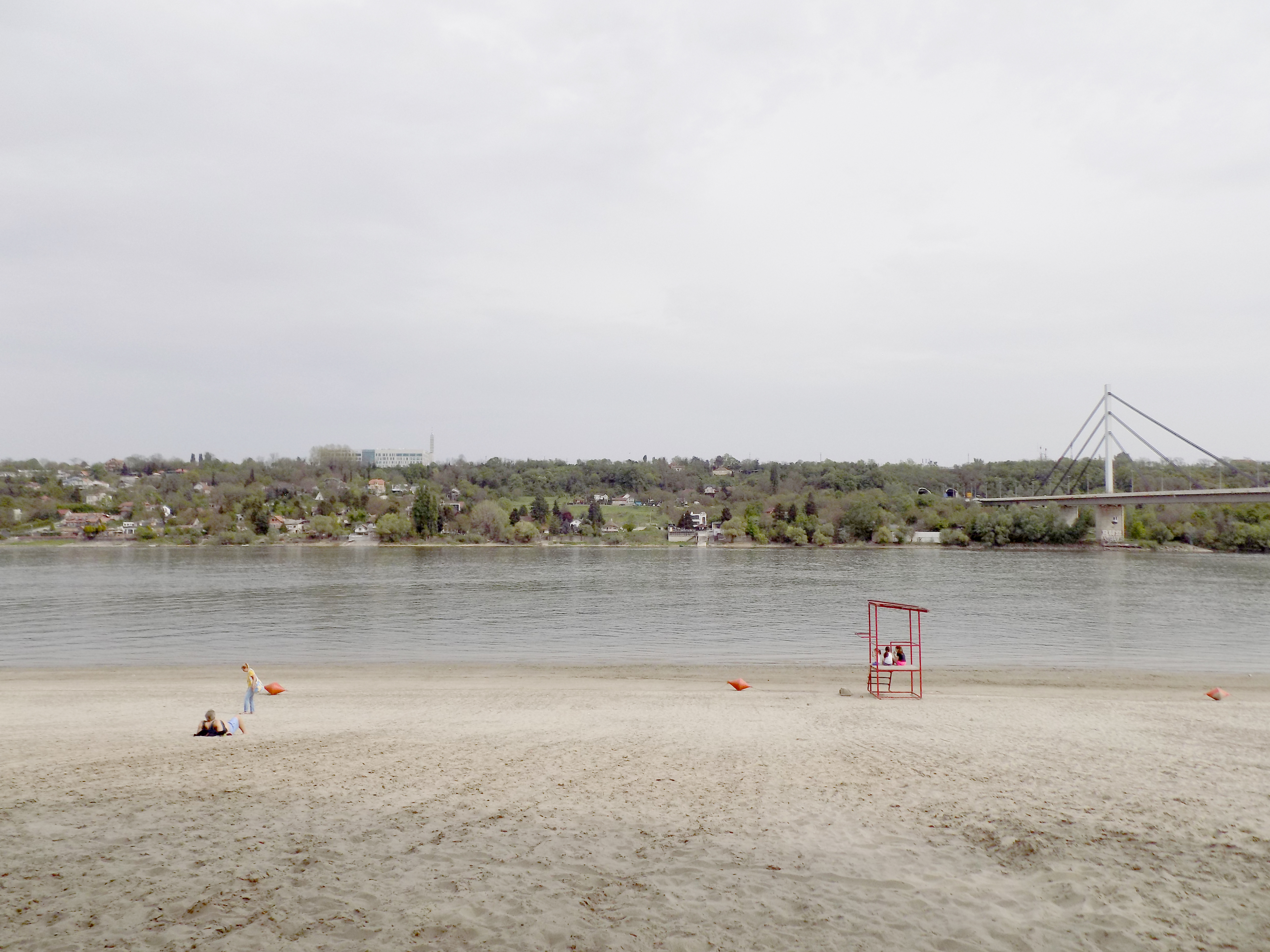
Štrand beach overlooking Radio Television of Vojvodina and Liberty Bridge

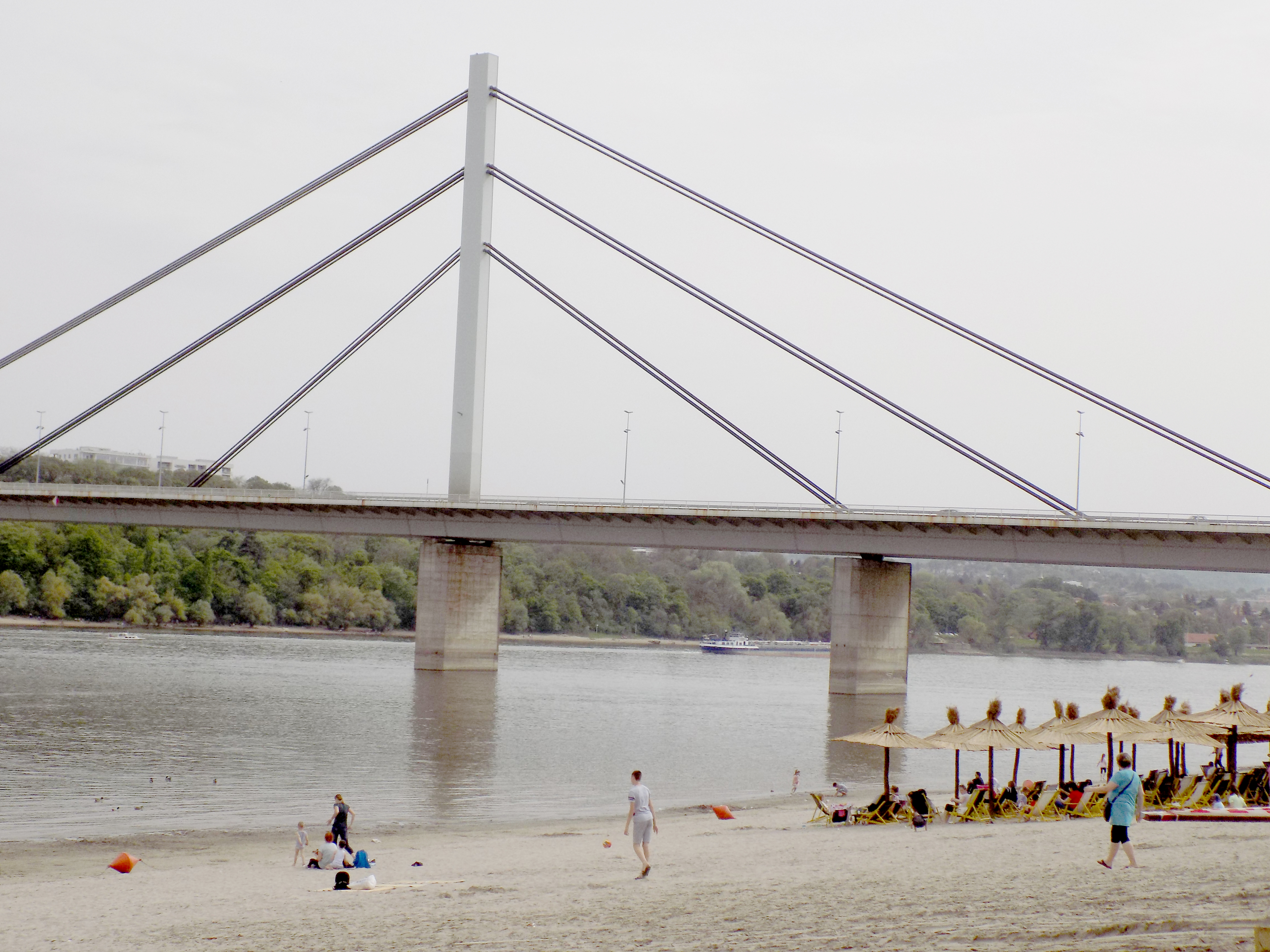
Liberty Bridge above the beach

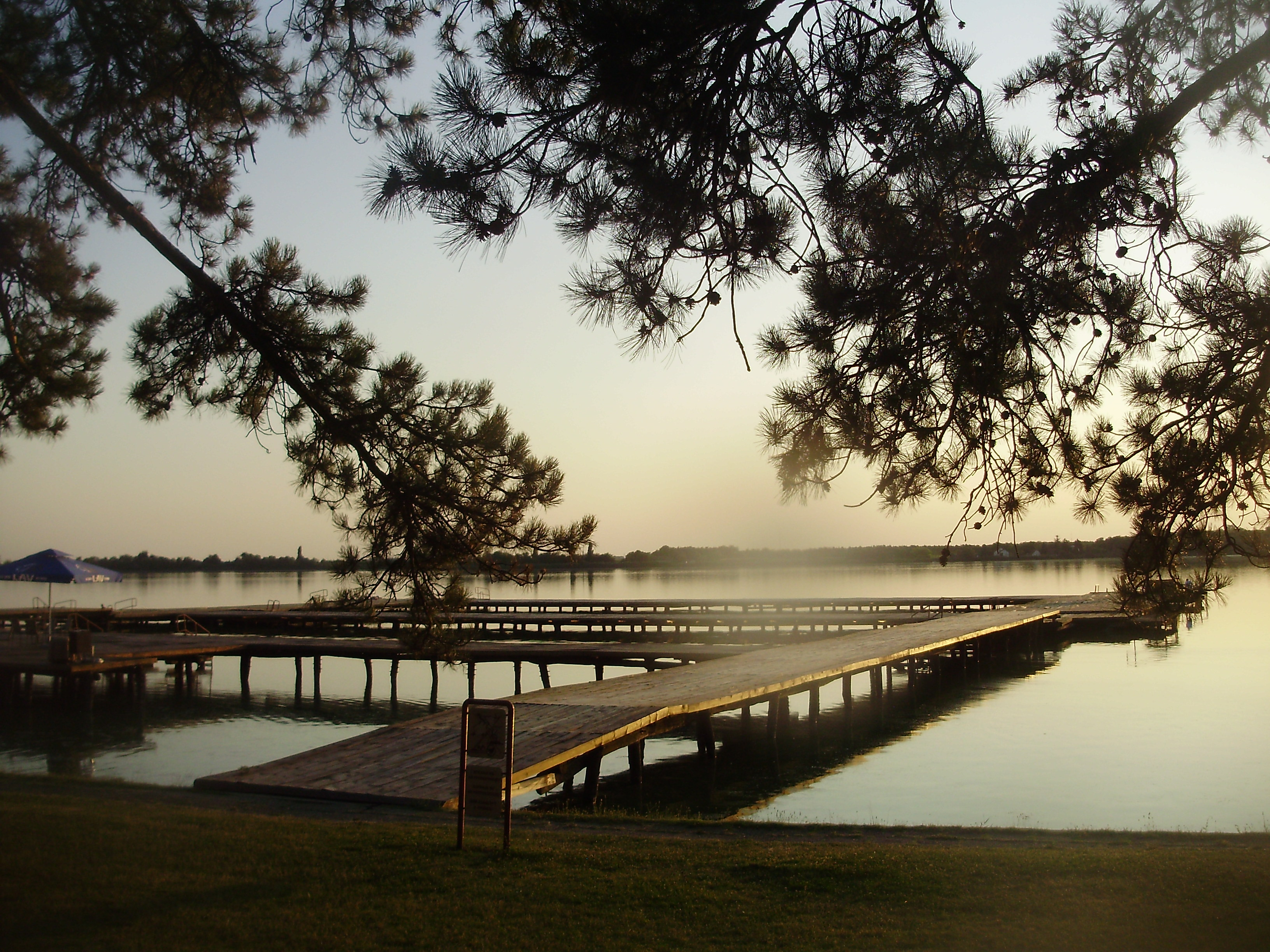
Štrand

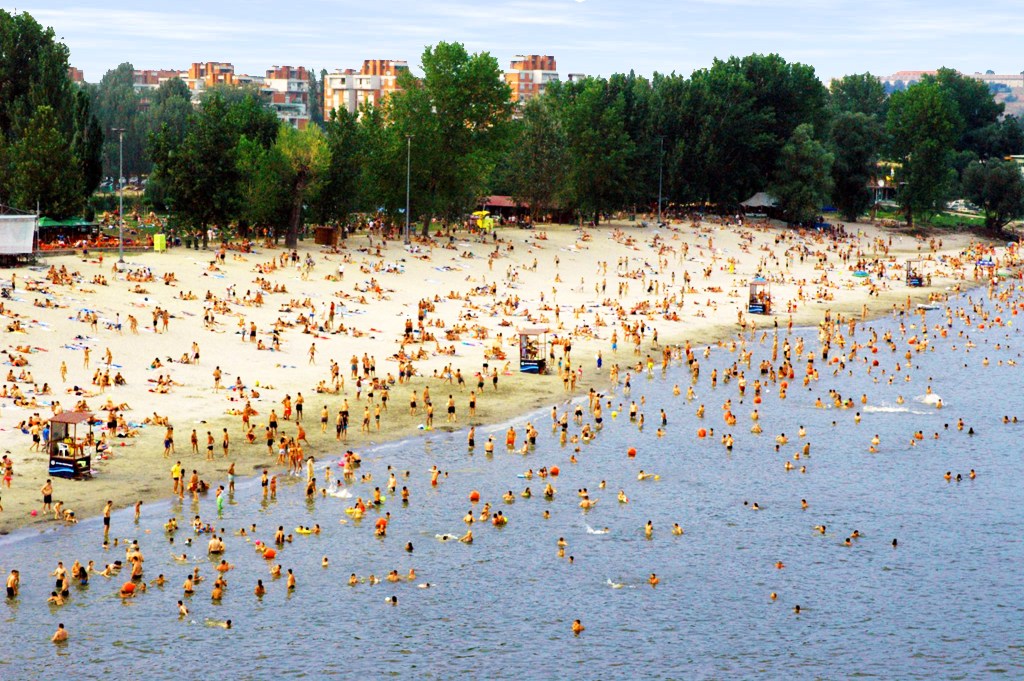
Štrand during summer

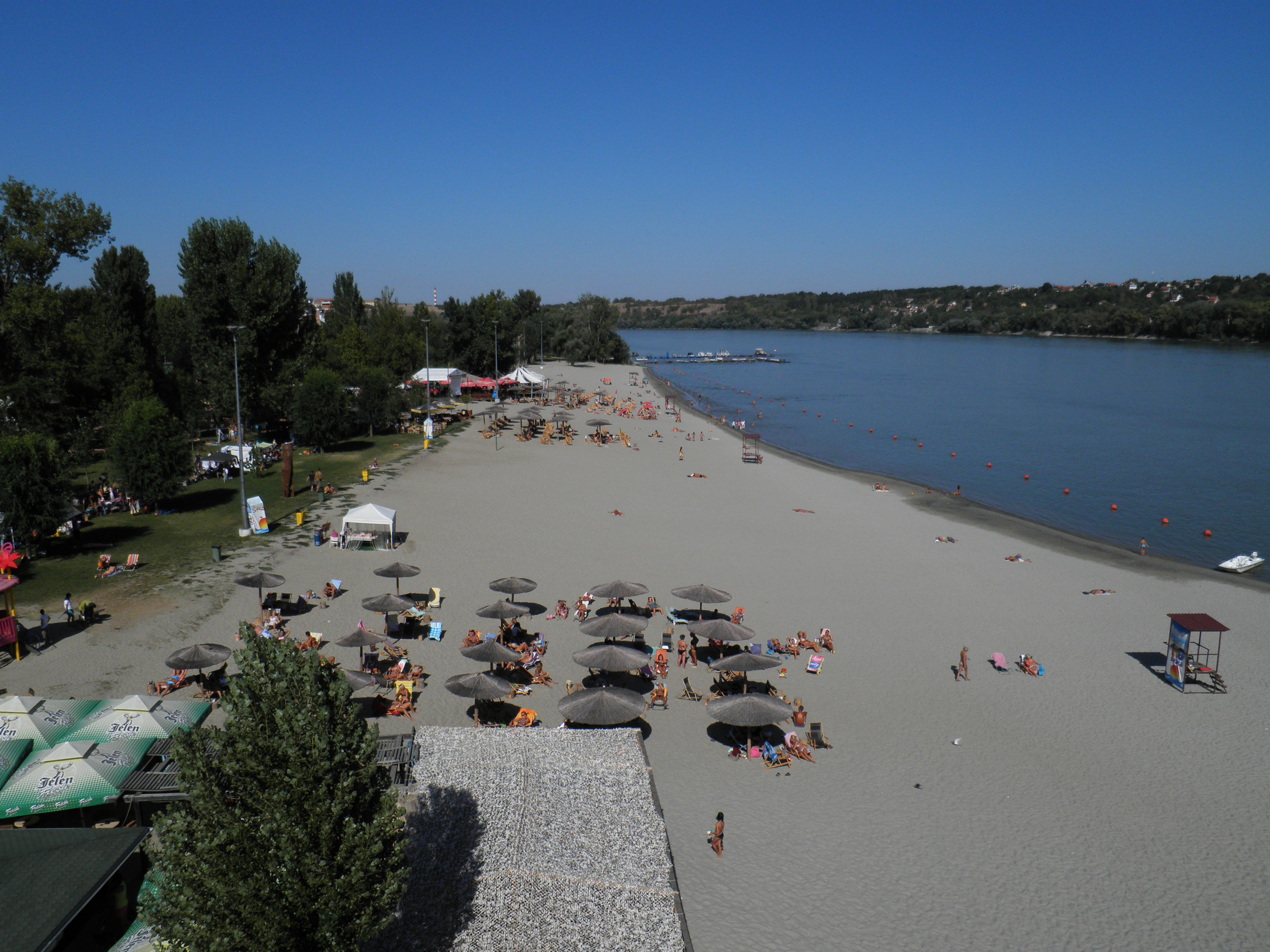
Štrand during summer

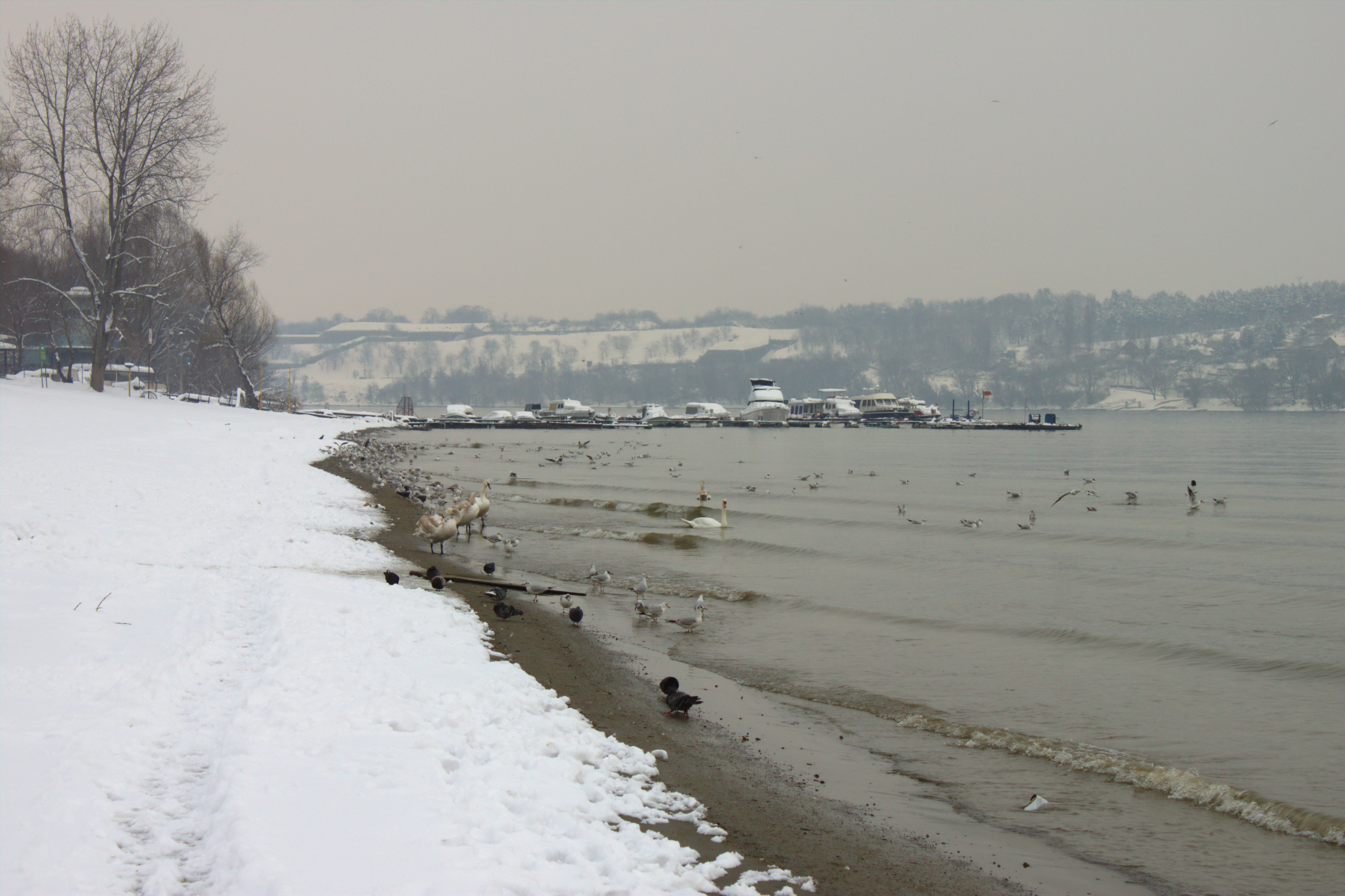
Štrand during winter
