= Marc Van De Weghe =

Belgian swimmer

Personal information
- Born: 9 May 1964 (age 62)

Sport
- Sport: Swimming

Marc Van De Weghe (born 9 May 1964) is a Belgian freestyle swimmer. He competed in two events at the 1984 Summer Olympics.
