= Milorad Stanulov =

Serbian rower (born 1953)

Medal record

Men's rowing

Representing Yugoslavia

Olympic Games
Silver medal – second place	1980 Moscow	Double sculls
Bronze medal – third place	1984 Los Angeles	Double sculls

World Championships
Bronze medal – third place	1978 Hamilton	Single sculls

Milorad Stanulov (born 20 February 1953, in Zrenjanin) is a Serbian rower who competed for Yugoslavia. He and Zoran Pančić are only Serbs to win an Olympic medal in rowing.
