= Rudi Ceyssens =

Belgian cyclist

Personal information
- Born: 19 July 1962 Koersel, Belgium
- Died: 20 December 2015 (aged 53) Heusden-Zolder

Cycling career
- Sport: Cycling

Rudi Ceyssens (19 July 1962 – 20 December 2015) was a Belgian cyclist. He competed in three events at the 1984 Summer Olympics.
