= Daniel Winkler (rower) =

Swiss rower

Personal information
- Nationality: Swiss
- Born: 9 May 1959 (age 67)

Sport
- Sport: Rowing

Daniel Winkler (born 9 May 1959) is a Swiss rower. He competed in the men's double sculls event at the 1984 Summer Olympics.
