= John Bolt (rower) =

Australian rower

Personal information
- Nationality: Australian
- Born: 22 May 1956 (age 68)

Sport
- Sport: Rowing

John Bolt (born 22 May 1956) is an Australian rower. He competed in the men's coxless pair event at the 1980 Summer Olympics.
