= Carmel Clark =

New Zealand swimmer (born 1965)

Personal information
- Born: 1965 (age 60–61) Lower Hutt, New Zealand

Sport
- Sport: Swimming

Carmel Clark (born 1965) is a former freestyle and backstroke swimmer from New Zealand, who represented her native country in the 1984 Summer Olympics swimming events. She reached the finals in both the 100m and 200m backstroke events, coached by John Beaumont, and finished in eighth place in both finals, also finishing 28th in the 100m freestyle event.

Clark is the daughter of Tony Clark, a former Wellington rugby union representative player and later a schoolteacher. She also competed in four events in the 1986 Commonwealth Games in Edinburgh, finishing fifth in the 200m backstroke and seventh in the 100m backstroke, and participating in the 4 × 100 m freestyle relay in which the New Zealand team placed fifth.
