= Brad Alan Lewis =

American rower

Personal information
- Full name: Bradley Alan Lewis
- Born: November 9, 1954 (age 71) Los Angeles, California, U.S.
Medal record
Men's rowing
Representing the United States
Olympic Games
Gold medal – first place	1984 Los Angeles	Men's double sculls

Brad Alan Lewis (born November 9, 1954, in Los Angeles, California) is an American competition rower and an Olympic Games gold medalist.

== Biography ==
Lewis and his rowing partner Paul Enquist won the gold medal in the double sculls at the 1984 Los Angeles Olympic Games. They were the first American rowing crew to win a gold medal in any event since 1964. Lewis is a writer. He wrote an account of his 13-year Olympic gold medal effort entitled OLYMPIAN.
