= Tom Lemaire =

Belgian diver

Personal information
- Nationality: Belgian
- Born: 26 July 1960 (age 64); Bujumbura, Burundi

Sport
- Sport: Diving

Tom Lemaire (born 26 July 1960) is a Belgian diver. He competed at the 1984 Summer Olympics and the 1988 Summer Olympics.
