= Zoran Pančić =

Serbian rower (born 1953)

Medal record

Men's rowing

Representing Yugoslavia

Olympic Games
Silver medal – second place	1980 Moscow	Double sculls
Bronze medal – third place	1984 Los Angeles	Double sculls

Zoran Pančić (born 25 September 1953 in Novi Sad) is a Serbian rower who competed for Yugoslavia. He and Milorad Stanulov are the only Serbs to win an Olympic medal in rowing.
