= Anders Wilgotson =

Swedish rower

Personal information
- Full name: Per Anders Wilgotson
- Nationality: Swedish
- Born: 30 September 1950 (age 74)

Sport
- Sport: Rowing

Per Anders Wilgotson (born 30 September 1950) is a Swedish rower. He competed at the 1980 Summer Olympics and the 1984 Summer Olympics.
