= Paul Enquist =

American rower (born 1955)

Personal information
- Born: December 13, 1955 (age 70) Seattle, Washington, U.S.
Medal record
Men's rowing
Representing the United States
Olympic Games
Gold medal – first place	1984 Los Angeles	Men's double sculls

Paul N. Enquist (born December 13, 1955, in Seattle, Washington) is an American competition rower and Olympic champion an Olympic Games gold medalist.

Enquist won a gold medal in double sculls at the 1984 Summer Olympics, together with Brad Alan Lewis.

Enquist attended Washington State University from where he graduated in 1977 with a degree in Mechanical Engineering.

His rowing partner (Lewis) wrote a book about their success at the Olympic contest.
