= Marnix Vervinck =

Belgian archer (born 1959)

Personal information
- Nationality: Belgian
- Born: 9 August 1959 (age 66) Beernem, Belgium

Sport
- Sport: Archery

Marnix Vervinck (born 9 August 1959) is a Belgian archer. He competed in the men's individual event at the 1984 Summer Olympics.
