= Dirk Crois =

Belgian rower

Medal record

Men's rowing

Representing Belgium

Olympic Games
Silver medal – second place	1984 Los Angeles	Double sculls

Dirk Crois (born 18 April 1961 in Bruges) is a Belgian rower.
