= Pierre-Marie Deloof =

Belgian rower

Medal record

Men's rowing

Representing Belgium

Olympic Games
Silver medal – second place	1984 Los Angeles	Double sculls

Pierre-Marie Deloof (born 29 September 1964, in Bruges) is a Belgian rower.
