= Yuriy Pimenov =

Russian rower (1958–2019)

Personal information
- Full name: Yuriy Igorevich Pimenov
- Born: 29 March 1958 Moscow, Russian SFSR, Soviet Union
- Died: 19 April 2019 (aged 61)
- Height: 1.96 m (6 ft 5 in)
- Weight: 94 kg (207 lb)
- Relatives: Nikolay Pimenov (twin brother)

Sport
- Sport: Rowing
- Club: Dynamo Moscow
Medal record
Men's rowing
Representing the Soviet Union
Olympic Games
Silver medal – second place	1980 Moscow	Coxless pair
Friendship Games
Gold medal – first place	1984 Moscow	Coxless pair
World Rowing Championships
Gold medal – first place	1981 Munich	Coxless pair
Gold medal – first place	1985 Hazewinkel	Coxless pair
Gold medal – first place	1986 Nottingham	Coxless pair
Silver medal – second place	1979 Bled	Coxless pair
Silver medal – second place	1983 Duisburg	Coxless four
Silver medal – second place	1990 Tasmania	Coxless pair
Bronze medal – third place	1987 Copenhagen	Coxless pair

Yuriy Igorevich Pimenov (Russian: Юрий Игорьевич Пименов; 29 March 1958 – 19 April 2019) was a Russian rower who mostly competed in the coxless pairs, rowing with his twin brother Nikolay. Between 1978 and 1993 the brothers won a silver medal at the 1980 Olympics, as well as three gold, three silver and one bronze medal at the world championships. They finished in 6th and 15th place at the 1988 and 1992 Games, respectively, missing the 1984 Olympics due to their boycott by the Soviet Union. They went to the Friendship Games instead, dubbed the alternative Olympics, where they won gold.

Pimenov was an international rowing referee and the chief referee of the Russian Rowing Federation. In 1994 he became the third person to receive the Thomas Keller Medal, the highest honor in rowing.
