= Nikolay Pimenov =

Russian rower

Personal information
- Full name: Nikolay Igorevich Pimenov
- Born: 29 March 1958 (age 68) Moscow, Russian SFSR, Soviet Union
- Height: 1.90 m (6 ft 3 in)
- Weight: 86 kg (190 lb)
- Relatives: Yuriy Pimenov (twin brother)

Sport
- Sport: Rowing
Medal record
Representing the Soviet Union
Olympic Games
| Silver medal – second place | 1980 Moscow | Coxless pair |
Friendship Games
| Gold medal – first place | 1984 Moscow | Coxless pair |
World Rowing Championships
| Gold medal – first place | 1981 Munich | Coxless pair |
| Gold medal – first place | 1985 Hazewinkel | Coxless pair |
| Gold medal – first place | 1986 Nottingham | Coxless pair |
| Silver medal – second place | 1979 Bled | Coxless pair |
| Silver medal – second place | 1983 Duisburg | Coxless four |
| Silver medal – second place | 1990 Tasmania | Coxless pair |
| Bronze medal – third place | 1987 Copenhagen | Coxless pair |

Nikolay Igorevich Pimenov (Russian: Николай Игорьевич Пименов; born 29 March 1958) is a retired Russian rower who mostly competed in the coxless pairs, rowing with his twin brother Yuriy. Between 1978 and 1993 the brothers won a silver medal at the 1980 Olympics, as well as three gold, three silver and one bronze medal at the world championships. They finished in 6th and 15th place at the 1988 and 1992 Games, respectively, missing the 1984 Olympics due to their boycott by the Soviet Union.

Pimenov is the head coach of the Russian junior team and an internationally recognized painter. In 1996 he became the fifth person to receive the Thomas Keller Medal, the highest honor in rowing. After winning the 1985 world title he had to be hospitalized due to exhaustion and missed the award ceremony.
