= Thomas Linemayr =

Austrian rower

- Born: 13 October 1960 (age 65); Austria
- Education: Johannes Kepler University Linz
- Title: CEO, Tchibo
- Predecessor: Markus Conrad

Thomas Linemayr (born 13 October 1960) is an Austrian businessman, the chief executive officer (CEO) of Tchibo, a German chain of coffee retailers and cafés, with over 1000 branches.

Linemayr worked for Lindt & Sprungli since 1995, and was CEO of its US business from 1999 to 2016.

In 2016, Linemayr succeeded Markus Conrad as CEO of Tchibo.

Linemayr is also a two-time Olympian for the Austrian Rowing team, finishing in the Top-10 in both the 1980 and 1984 Olympics.
