= Wilfried Auerbach =

Austrian rower (1960–2025)

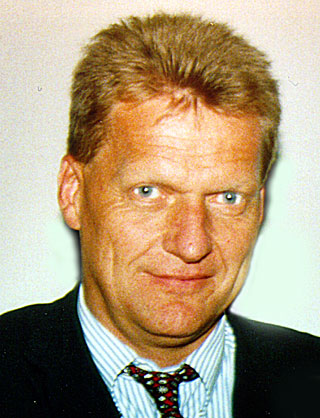
- Auerbach in 2008

Personal information
- Nationality: Austrian
- Born: 17 March 1960 Ried im Innkreis, Upper Austria, Austria
- Died: 21 November 2025 (aged 65)

Sport
- Sport: Rowing

Wilfried Auerbach (17 March 1960 – 21 November 2025) was an Austrian rower. He competed at the 1980 Summer Olympics and the 1984 Summer Olympics. Auerbach died on 21 November 2025, at the age of 65.
