= Georg Agrikola =

German rower

Personal information
- Nationality: German
- Born: 11 January 1959 (age 66); Landau, Germany

Sport
- Sport: Rowing

Georg Agrikola (born 11 January 1959) is a German rower. He competed at the 1984 Summer Olympics and the 1988 Summer Olympics.
