= Sabine Pauwels =

Belgian swimmer

Personal information
- Born: 1 December 1966 (age 59) Hamme, Belgium

Sport
- Sport: Swimming

Sabine Pauwels (born 1 December 1966) is a Belgian former backstroke, freestyle and medley swimmer. She competed in three events at the 1984 Summer Olympics.
