= Ike Landvoigt =

German rower

Personal information
- Born: 19 September 1973 (age 52) Potsdam, East Germany
- Height: 1.95 m (6 ft 5 in)
- Weight: 92 kg (203 lb)

Sport
- Sport: Rowing
- Club: BRC, Berlin
Medal record
Men's rowing
Representing Germany
World Rowing Championships
Gold medal – first place	1995 Tampere	Eight
Silver medal – second place	1998 Cologne	Eight

Ike Landvoigt (born 19 September 1973) is a retired German rower who won a gold and a silver medal in the eights at the world championships of 1995 and 1998, respectively. He finished in 9th and 11th place in the coxless fours at the 1996 and 2000 Olympics, respectively. His father Jörg is also a retired Olympic rower.
