= Croatian Rowing Federation =

Governing body of rowing in Croatia

- Sport: Rowing
- Jurisdiction: Croatia
- Abbreviation: (HVS)
- Founded: November 4, 1939
- Affiliation: FISA
- Affiliation date: January 17, 1992
- Headquarters: Trg Krešimira Čosića 11, 10000 Zagreb
- President: Željko Kisić
- Secretary: Zdravko Gajšak

Official website
- www.veslanje.hr
- (Croatia)

The Croatian Rowing Federation (Croatian: Hrvatski veslački savez) is the governing body of rowing in Croatia. It organizes the Croatian representation at international competitions and the Croatian national championships.

The federation was formed on November 4, 1939 in Zagreb. It became a member of the Croatian Olympic Committee in 1991 and the International Federation of Rowing Associations in 1992.

It organized the World Rowing Championships in 2000 in Jarun.

== Olympic Medalists ==
Medal	Olympics	Event	Crew Members
Bronze	2000 Sidney	Men's Eight	Branimir Vujević, Igor Boraska, Nikša Skelin, Siniša Skelin, Krešimir Čuljak, Tomislav Smoljanović, Tihomir Franković, Igor Francetić, cox Silvijo Petriško
Silver	2004 Athens	Men's Coxless pair	Nikša Skelin, Siniša Skelin
Silver	2012 London	Men's Quadruple scull	Damir Martin, Martin Sinković, Valent Sinković, David Šain
Gold	2016 Rio	Men's Double scull	Martin Sinković, Valent Sinković
Silver	2016 Rio	Men's Single sculls	Damir Martin
Gold	2020 Tokyo	Men's Coxless pair	Martin Sinković, Valent Sinković
Bronze	2020 Tokyo	Men's Single sculls	Damir Martin
Gold	2024 Paris	Men's Coxless pair	Martin Sinković, Valent Sinković
