= Croatia at the 2000 Summer Olympics =

- IOC code: CRO
- NOC: Croatian Olympic Committee
- Website: www.hoo.hr (in Croatian and English)

in Sydney
- Competitors: 88 (63 men and 25 women) in 12 sports
- Flag bearer: Zoran Primorac
- Medals Ranked 49th: Gold 1 Silver 0 Bronze 1 Total 2

Summer Olympics appearances (overview)
- 1992; 1996; 2000; 2004; 2008; 2012; 2016; 2020; 2024

Other related appearances
- Austria (1900); Yugoslavia (1920–1988)

Croatia competed at the 2000 Summer Olympics in Sydney, Australia.

== Medalists ==
Medal	Name	Sport	Event
Gold	Nikolaj Pešalov	Weightlifting	Men's Featherweight (62 kg)
Bronze	Igor Boraska; Krešimir Čuljak; Igor Francetić; Tihomir Franković; Silvijo Petriško; Nikša Skelin; Siniša Skelin; Tomislav Smoljanović; Branimir Vujević	Rowing	Men's Eights

== Athletics ==
Men
Track & road events

Athlete	Event	Heat		Quarterfinal		Semifinal		Final	
Athlete	Event	Result	Rank	Result	Rank	Result	Rank	Result	Rank
Darko Juričić	400 m hurdles	52.39	56	Did not advance					
Dejan Vojnović	100 m	10.50	49	Did not advance					
Branko Zorko	1500 m	3:46.16	36	Did not advance					
Tihomir Buinjac; Siniša Ergotić; Slaven Krajačić; Dejan Vojnović	4 × 100 metres	39.87	29	Did not advance					
Frano Bakarić; Nino Habun; Darko Juričić; Elvis Peršić	4 × 400 metres	DSQ		Did not advance					

Field events

Athlete	Event	Qualification		Final	
Athlete	Event	Distance	Position	Distance	Position
Stevimir Ercegovac	Shot put	18.98	24	Did not advance	
Siniša Ergotić	Long jump	7.53	36	Did not advance	
Andraš Haklić	Hammer throw	72.66	14	Did not advance	
Dragan Mustapić	Discus throw	58.10	17	Did not advance	

Women
Track & road events

Athlete	Event	Heat		Quarterfinal		Semifinal		Final	
Athlete	Event	Result	Rank	Result	Rank	Result	Rank	Result	Rank
Kristina Perica	400 m	53.72	40	Did not advance					

Field events

Athlete	Event	Qualification		Final	
Athlete	Event	Distance	Position	Distance	Position
Blanka Vlašić	High jump	1.92	17	Did not advance	
Ivana Brkljačić	Hammer throw	65.01	5 q	63.20	11

== Canoeing ==
=== Slalom ===
Athlete	Event	Qualifying						Final					
Athlete	Event	Run 1	Rank	Run 2	Rank	Total	Rank	Run 1	Rank	Run 2	Rank	Total	Rank
Danko Herceg	Men's C-1	138.59	12	137.23	7	275.82	11 Q	125.87	10	122.90	9	248.77	10
Andrej Glucks	Men's K-1	128.76	9	134.90	18	263.66	15 Q	115.16	11	115.06	13	230.22	11

=== Sprint ===
Men

Athlete	Event	Heats		Repechages		Semifinals		Final	
Athlete	Event	Time	Rank	Time	Rank	Time	Rank	Time	Rank
Nikica Ljubek	C-1 1000 m	4:10.954	9	Did not advance					
Dražen Funtak; Nikica Ljubek	C-2 500 m	1:45.567	6 q	—N/a		1:45.955	6	Did not advance	

== Rowing ==
Athlete	Event	Heats		Repechage		Semifinals		Final	
Athlete	Event	Time	Rank	Time	Rank	Time	Rank	Time	Rank
Ninoslav Saraga; Oliver Martinov	Men's Coxless pair	6:52.57	3 Q	Bye		6:46.00	6 FB	6:35.18	8
Ivan Jukić; Tihomir Jarnjević	Men's Double sculls	6:39.69	5 R	6:43.60	4 FC	Bye		6:31.78	14
Igor Francetić; Tihomir Franković; Tomislav Smoljanović; Nikša Skelin; Siniša Skelin; Krešimir Čuljak; Igor Boraska; Branimir Vujević; Silvijo Petriško	Men's Coxed eight	5:33.33	1 Q	Bye				5:34.85	3rd place, bronze medalist(s)

== Sailing ==
Men

Athlete	Event	Race											Net points	Final rank
Athlete	Event	1	2	3	4	5	6	7	8	9	10	11	Net points	Final rank
Karlo Kuret	Finn	6	10	~~18~~	9	8	14	2	~~16~~	13	3	4	69	10
Toni Bulaja; Ivan Bulaja	470	~~OCS~~	19	18	19	11	19	22	21	16	~~27~~	17	162	24

Open

Athlete	Event	Race											Net points	Final rank
Athlete	Event	1	2	3	4	5	6	7	8	9	10	11	Net points	Final rank
Mate Arapov	Laser	~~RET~~	~~RET~~	44	44	44	44	44	44	44	44	44	396	43

== Shooting ==
Men

Athlete	Event	Qualification		Final	
Athlete	Event	Score	Rank	Score	Rank
Roman Špirelja	25 m rapid fire pistol	578	15	Did not advance	

Women

Athlete	Event	Qualification		Final	
Athlete	Event	Score	Rank	Score	Rank
Mladenka Malenica	50 m rifle three positions	571	26	Did not advance	
Mladenka Malenica	10 m air rifle	393	9	Did not advance	

== Swimming ==
Men

Athlete	Event	Heat		Semifinal		Final	
Athlete	Event	Time	Rank	Time	Rank	Time	Rank
Krešimir Čač	200 metre individual medley	2:07.04	36	Did not advance			
Duje Draganja	100 metre freestyle	49.83	16 Q	49.67	11	Did not advance	
Lovrenco Franičević	200 metre butterfly	2:04.35	39	Did not advance			
Marijan Kanjer	50 metre freestyle	23.16	32	Did not advance			
Gordan Kožulj	100 metre backstroke	55.43	8 Q	56.26	14	Did not advance	
Gordan Kožulj	200 metre backstroke	2:00.19	9 Q	1:59.56	6 Q	1:59.38	8
Ivan Mladina	100 metre butterfly	56.17	50	Did not advance			
Vanja Rogulj	100 metre breaststroke	1:03.58	30	Did not advance			
Marko Strahija	100 metre backstroke	56.26	18	Did not advance			
Marko Strahija	200 metre backstroke	2:00.72	12 Q	1:59.85	9	Did not advance	
Sandro Tomaš	400 metre individual medley	4:38.31	42	Did not advance			
Duje Draganja; Marijan Kanjer; Ivan Mladina; Alen Lončar	4 × 100 m freestyle relay	3:24.96	19	Did not advance			
Gordan Kožulj; Vanja Rogulj; Miloš Milošević; Duje Draganja	4 × 100 m medley relay	3:42.73	14	Did not advance			

Women

Athlete	Event	Heat		Semifinal		Final	
Athlete	Event	Time	Rank	Time	Rank	Time	Rank
Petra Banović	200 metre freestyle	2:08.30	36	Did not advance			
Petra Banović	200 metre backstroke	2:25.42	34	Did not advance			
Tinka Dančević	200 metre butterfly	2:21.02	34	Did not advance			
Smiljana Marinović	100 metre breaststroke	1:13.49	30	Did not advance			
Smiljana Marinović	200 metre individual medley	2:25.24	33	Did not advance			
Marijana Šurković	50 metre freestyle	27.32	46	Did not advance			

== Table tennis ==
Men

Athlete	Event	Group round			Round of 16	Quarterfinals	Semifinals	Bronze medal	Final	
Athlete	Event	Opposition Result	Opposition Result	Rank	Opposition Result	Opposition Result	Opposition Result	Opposition Result	Opposition Result	Rank
Zoran Primorac	Men's singles	BYE			Toshio Tasaki (JPN); L 0 – 3	Did not advance				

Women

Athlete	Event	Group round			Round of 16	Quarterfinals	Semifinals	Bronze medal	Final	
Athlete	Event	Opposition Result	Opposition Result	Rank	Opposition Result	Opposition Result	Opposition Result	Opposition Result	Opposition Result	Rank
Eldijana Aganović	Women's singles	Liu Jia (AUT); L 1 – 3	Marisel Ramírez (CUB); W 3 – 0	2	Did not advance					
Andrea Bakula	Women's singles	Gao Jun (USA); L 0 – 3	Stella Zhou (AUS); W 3 – 2	2	Did not advance					
Tamara Boroš	Women's singles	BYE			Lijuan Geng (CAN); L 2 – 3	Did not advance				
Eldijana Aganović; Tamara Boroš	Women's doubles	Tsui Hsiu-li; Yu Feng-yin (TPE); W 2 – 1	Bose Kaffo; Olufunke Oshonaike (NGR); W 2 – 0	1 Q	Jing Junhong; Li Jiawei (SIN); W 3 – 2	Li Ju; Wang Nan (CHN); L 1 – 3	Did not advance			5

== Taekwondo ==
Women

Athlete	Event	Round of 16	Quarterfinals	Semifinals	Repechage 1	Repechage 2	Bronze medal	Final	
Athlete	Event	Opposition Result	Opposition Result	Opposition Result	Opposition Result	Opposition Result	Opposition Result	Opposition Result	Rank
Nataša Vezmar	Women's +67 kg	BYE	Ruíz (ESP); W 7–4	Ivanova (RUS); L 4–6	BYE	Bourguigue (MAR); W 4–1	Bosshart (ESP); L 8–11	Did not advance	4

== Tennis ==
Men

Athlete	Event	Round of 64	Round of 32	Round of 16	Quarterfinals	Semifinals	Final	
Athlete	Event	Opposition Score	Opposition Score	Opposition Score	Opposition Score	Opposition Score	Opposition Score	Rank
Goran Ivanišević	Singles	Àlex Corretja (ESP); L 6:7, 6:7	Did not advance					
Ivan Ljubičić	Singles	Dominik Hrbatý (SVK); W 6:1, 1:6, 6:3	Kevin Ullyett (ZIM); W 6:2, 4:6, 6:4	Gustavo Kuerten (BRA); L 6:7, 3:6	Did not advance			
Goran Ivanišević; Ivan Ljubičić	Doubles	—N/a	Jose de Armas; Jimy Szymanski (VEN); L 2:6, 6:7	Did not advance				

Women

Athlete	Event	Round of 64	Round of 32	Round of 16	Quarterfinals	Semifinals	Final	
Athlete	Event	Opposition Score	Opposition Score	Opposition Score	Opposition Score	Opposition Score	Opposition Score	Rank
Iva Majoli	Singles	Anne Kremer (LUX); L 2:6, 4:6	Did not advance					
Silvija Talaja	Singles	Neyssa Etienne (HAI); W 6:1, 6:0	Silvia Farina Elia (ITA); L 6:3, 4:6, 4:6	Did not advance				
Iva Majoli; Silvija Talaja	Doubles	—N/a	Els Callens; Dominique van Roost (BEL); L 2:6, 7:5, 2:6	Did not advance				

== Volleyball ==
=== Women's team competition ===
==== Preliminary round ====
Group A

Pos	Team	Pld	W	L	Pts	SW	SL	SR	SPW	SPL	SPR	Qualification
1	Brazil	5	5	0	10	15	1	15.000	395	272	1.452	Quarterfinals
2	United States	5	4	1	9	13	4	3.250	392	306	1.281	Quarterfinals
3	Croatia	5	3	2	8	9	9	1.000	411	389	1.057	Quarterfinals
4	China	5	2	3	7	8	9	0.889	371	365	1.016	Quarterfinals
5	Australia	5	1	4	6	4	13	0.308	303	408	0.743	
6	Kenya	5	0	5	5	2	15	0.133	280	412	0.680	

- 16 September 2000

Croatia	3–1	Australia	25–21, 22–25, 25–14, 25–16

- 18 September 2000

China	1–3	Croatia	23–25, 28–26, 20–25, 15–25

- 20 September 2000

Croatia	0–3	United States	19–25, 18–25, 16–25

- 22 September 2000

Brazil	3–0	Croatia	25–21, 25–23, 25–23

- 24 September 2000

Kenya	1–3	Croatia	25–18, 16–25, 18–25, 18–25

==== Quarter-finals ====
- 26 September 2000

Cuba	3–0	Croatia	25–18, 25–23, 25–21

==== 5–8th place ====
- 27 September 2000

Croatia	1–3	Germany	25–27, 29–27, 21–25, 18–25

==== 7th place ====
- 28 September 2000

Croatia	3–1	South Korea	25–18, 24–26, 25–22, 25–21

=== Roster ===
- Marija Anzulović
- Elena Cebukina
- Patricia Daničić
- Biljana Gligorović
- Barbara Jelić
- Vesna Jelić
- Gordana Jurcan
- Ana Kaštelan
- Nataša Leto
- Marijana Ribičić
- Beti Rimac
- Ingrid Siscovich

== Water polo ==
=== Men's team competition ===
==== Preliminary round ====
Group B

Pos	Team	Pld	W	D	L	GF	GA	GD	Pts	Qualification
1	FR Yugoslavia	5	4	1	0	41	22	+19	9	Quarter Finals
2	Croatia	5	4	1	0	42	30	+12	9	Quarter Finals
3	Hungary	5	3	0	2	49	39	+10	6	Quarter Finals
4	United States	5	2	0	3	42	39	+3	4	Quarter Finals
5	Netherlands	5	1	0	4	34	55	−21	2	
6	Greece	5	0	0	5	22	45	−23	0	

Source: LA84
Rules for classification: 1) Points; 2) Head-to-head points; 3) Head-to-head goal difference; 4) Head-to-head goals scored; 5) Goal difference.

23 September 2000; 16:15	Croatia	10–7	United States	Ryde Aquatic Leisure Centre; Referees: Kerr (AUS), Galkine (RUS)
23 September 2000; 16:15	Score by quarters: 3–1, 4–1, 1–2, 2–3			Ryde Aquatic Leisure Centre; Referees: Kerr (AUS), Galkine (RUS)

24 September 2000; 19:15	Greece	5–9	Croatia	Ryde Aquatic Leisure Centre; Referees: Turcotte (CAN), Afanasiev (RUS)
24 September 2000; 19:15	Score by quarters: 2–3, 1–2, 1–1, 1–3			Ryde Aquatic Leisure Centre; Referees: Turcotte (CAN), Afanasiev (RUS)

25 September 2000; 14:30	Croatia	8–7	Hungary	Ryde Aquatic Leisure Centre; Referees: Ludecke (GER), Kratochvil (SVK)
25 September 2000; 14:30	Score by quarters: 2–3, 1–1, 3–1, 2–2			Ryde Aquatic Leisure Centre; Referees: Ludecke (GER), Kratochvil (SVK)

26 September 2000; 19:15	Croatia	4–4	FR Yugoslavia	Ryde Aquatic Leisure Centre; Referees: Dani (ITA), Afanasiev (RUS)*
26 September 2000; 19:15	Score by quarters: 1–2, 0–0, 2–1, 1–1			Ryde Aquatic Leisure Centre; Referees: Dani (ITA), Afanasiev (RUS)*

27 September 2000; 14:30	Netherlands	7–11	Croatia	Ryde Aquatic Leisure Centre; Referees: Balfanbayev (KAZ), Melliar (RSA)
27 September 2000; 14:30	Score by quarters: 1–1, 1–4, 3–3, 2–3			Ryde Aquatic Leisure Centre; Referees: Balfanbayev (KAZ), Melliar (RSA)

==== Quarterfinals ====
29 September 2000; 19:15	Spain	9–8	Croatia	Ryde Aquatic Leisure Centre; Referees: Prikhodko (KAZ), Clemencon (FRA)
29 September 2000; 19:15	Score by quarters: 1–1, 3–1, 2–3, 3–3			Ryde Aquatic Leisure Centre; Referees: Prikhodko (KAZ), Clemencon (FRA)

==== Classification 5th–8th ====
30 September 2000; 19:00	United States	9–8	Croatia	Ryde Aquatic Leisure Centre; Referees: Moliner Molins (ESP), Clemencon (FRA)
30 September 2000; 19:00	Score by quarters: 1–0, 2–2, 2–2, 2–3,1–1,1–0			Ryde Aquatic Leisure Centre; Referees: Moliner Molins (ESP), Clemencon (FRA)

==== Classification 7th–8th ====
1 October 2000; 11:30	Croatia	10–8	Australia	Ryde Aquatic Leisure Centre; Referees: Boyer (USA), Turcotte (CAN)
1 October 2000; 11:30	Score by quarters: 2–2, 2–2, 4–2, 2–2			Ryde Aquatic Leisure Centre; Referees: Boyer (USA), Turcotte (CAN)

==== Roster ====
- Siniša Školneković
- Elvis Fatović
- Dubravko Šimenc
- Ognjen Kržić
- Ratko Štritof
- Mile Smodlaka
- Ivo Ivaniš
- Alen Bošković
- Samir Barač
- Igor Hinić
- Frano Vićan
- Vjekoslav Kobešćak
- Višeslav Sarić

== Weightlifting ==
Athlete	Event	Snatch		Clean & jerk		Total	Rank
Athlete	Event	Result	Rank	Result	Rank	Total	Rank
Nikolay Peshalov	Men's 62 kg	150.0	1	175.0 OR	2	325.0	1st place, gold medalist(s)
