= Rowing at the 2000 Summer Olympics – Men's eight =

Men's eight at the Games of the XXVII Olympiad
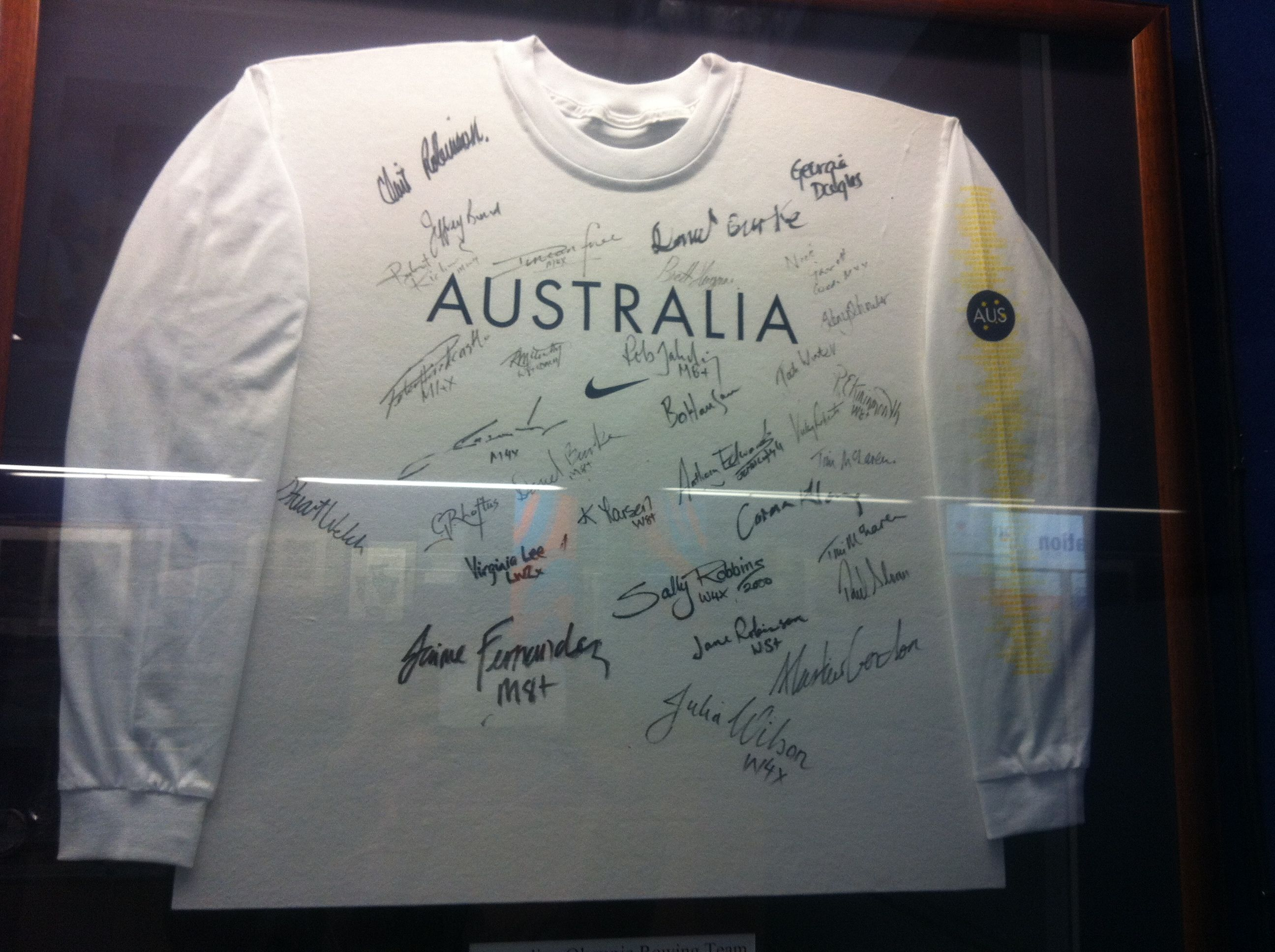
- Shirt signed by the Australian 2000 Summer Olympics rowing team
- Venue: Sydney International Regatta Centre
- Dates: 18–24 September 2000
- Competitors: 81 from 9 nations
- Winning time: 5:33.08

Medalists
| 1st place, gold medalist(s) | | Great Britain: Andrew Lindsay; Ben Hunt-Davis; Simon Dennis; Louis Attrill; Luka Grubor; Kieran West; Fred Scarlett; Steve Trapmore; Rowley Douglas |
| 2nd place, silver medalist(s) | | Australia: Christian Ryan; Alastair Gordon; Nick Porzig; Rob Jahrling; Mike McKay; Stuart Welch; Daniel Burke; Jaime Fernandez; Brett Hayman |
| 3rd place, bronze medalist(s) | | Croatia: Igor Francetić; Tihomir Franković; Tomislav Smoljanović; Nikša Skelin; Siniša Skelin; Krešimir Čuljak; Igor Boraska; Branimir Vujević; Silvijo Petriško |

The men's eight competition at the 2000 Summer Olympics in Sydney, Australia took place at the Sydney International Regatta Centre. It was held from 18 to 24 September. There were 9 boats (81 competitors) from 9 nations, with each nation limited to a single boat in the event. The event was won by Great Britain, the nation's first victory in the men's eight since back-to-back victories in 1908 and 1912; the three total gold medals was second-most among nations behind the United States (with 11). Australia took silver, while Croatia's debut in the men's eight was good for bronze.

== Background ==
This was the 23rd appearance of the event. Rowing had been on the programme in 1896 but was cancelled due to bad weather. The men's eight has been held every time that rowing has been contested, beginning in 1900.

The United States had dominated the event for four decades from the 1920s to the 1950s, but had not won a gold medal at the Olympics since 1964, falling short as the favourites in 1988. The Americans were favoured again in 2000, having won the last three World Championships in 1997, 1998, and 1999. Reigning Olympic champions the Netherlands had not reached a podium since the 1996 Games. Germany was not present; German teams (including the United Team, East, and West) had taken medals at 9 of the past 10 Games.

Croatia made its debut in the event. The United States made its 20th appearance, most among nations to that point.

== Competition format ==
This rowing event consisted of nine teams, split into two four- or five-team heats. The course used the 2000 metres distance that became the Olympic standard in 1912 (with the exception of 1948). Each team fielded a boat crewed by eight rowers and a coxswain. Each rower used a single oar, with four oars on each side of the boat. The winner of each heat qualified for the "Final A" (or medal) round. The remaining six teams competed in the repechage round, with the top four from that round qualifying for the "Final A" round. The last two teams in the repechage competed in the "Final B" round.

The final ranking for this event was based on the order of finish in the two finals. The top three of the "Final A" teams earned Olympic medals for placing first, second, and third, while the remaining "Final A" teams placed fourth through sixth, according to their "Final A" finish. The "Final B" competition determined the placement for the last three places (7–9) in the event's final ranking.

== Schedule ==
All times are Australian Time (UTC+10)

| Date | Time | Round |
|---|---|---|
| Monday, 18 September 2000 | 11:20 | Semifinals |
| Wednesday, 20 September 2000 | 10:30 | Repechage |
| Saturday, 23 September 2000 | 12:00 | Final B |
| Sunday, 24 September 2000 | 10:30 | Final A |

== Results ==
=== Semifinals ===
The winner of each heat advanced to the A Final, the remainders went to the repechage.

==== Semifinal 1 ====
| Rank | Rowers | Coxswain | Nation | Time | Notes |
|---|---|---|---|---|---|
| 1 | Igor Francetić; Tihomir Franković; Tomislav Smoljanović; Nikša Skelin; Siniša Skelin; Krešimir Čuljak; Igor Boraska; Branimir Vujević | Silvijo Petriško | Croatia | 5:33.33 | QA |
| 2 | Bryan Volpenhein; Robert Kaehler; Porter Collins; Thomas Welsh; David Simon; Chris Ahrens; Garrett Miller; Jeffrey Klepacki | Peter Cipollone | United States | 5:35.70 | R |
| 3 | Adri Middag; Peter van der Noort; Niels van der Zwan; Gerritjan Eggenkamp; Geert-Jan Derksen; Gijs Kind; Geert Cirkel; Nico Rienks | Merijn van Oijen | Netherlands | 5:36.42 | R |
| 4 | Costel Mutescu; Vasile Măstăcan; Cornel Nemțoc; Florian Tudor; Viorel Talapan; Andrei Bănică; Gheorghe Pîrvan; Dorin Alupei | Dumitru Răducanu | Romania | 5:36.93 | R |
| 5 | Gioacchino Cascone; Franco Berra; Mario Palmisano; Marco Penna; Valerio Pinton; Raffaello Leonardo; Alessandro Corona; Luca Ghezzi | Gaetano Iannuzzi | Italy | 5:39.69 | R |

==== Semifinal 2 ====
| Rank | Rowers | Coxswain | Nation | Time | Notes |
|---|---|---|---|---|---|
| 1 | Christian Ryan; Alastair Gordon; Nick Porzig; Rob Jahrling; Mike McKay; Stuart Welch; Daniel Burke; Jaime Fernandez | Brett Hayman | Australia | 5:32.85 | QA |
| 2 | Andrew Lindsay; Ben Hunt-Davis; Simon Dennis; Louis Attrill; Luka Grubor; Kieran West; Fred Scarlett; Steve Trapmore | Rowley Douglas | Great Britain | 5:34.47 | R |
| 3 | Michael Belenkie; Bryan Donnelly; Matt Swick; Thomas Herschmiller; Lawrence Varga; Morgan Crooks; David Calder; Adam Parfitt | Chris Taylor | Canada | 5:38.48 | R |
| 4 | Sergey Matveyev; Nikolay Aksyonov; Pavel Melnikov; Andrey Glukhov; Dmitry Kovalyov; Vladimir Volodenkov; Dmitry Rozinkevich; Anton Chermashentsev | Aleksandr Lukyanov | Russia | 5:40.55 | R |

=== Repechage ===
The first two in each heat qualified for Final A, while the remainder went to Final B.

==== Repechage heat 1 ====
| Rank | Rowers | Coxswain | Nation | Time | Notes |
|---|---|---|---|---|---|
| 1 | Bryan Volpenhein; Robert Kaehler; Porter Collins; Thomas Welsh; David Simon; Chris Ahrens; Garrett Miller; Jeffrey Klepacki | Peter Cipollone | United States | 5:43.22 | QA |
| 2 | Costel Pavel Mutescu; Vasile Măstăcan; Cornel Nemțoc; Florian Tudor; Viorel Talapan; Andrei Bănică; Gheorghe Pîrvan; Dorin Alupei | Dumitru Răducanu | Romania | 5:43.24 | QA |
| 3 | Michael Belenkie; Bryan Donnelly; Matt Swick; Thomas Herschmiller; Lawrence Varga; Morgan Crooks; David Calder; Adam Parfitt | Chris Taylor | Canada | 5:45.18 | QB |

==== Repechage heat 2 ====
| Rank | Rowers | Coxswain | Nation | Time | Notes |
|---|---|---|---|---|---|
| 1 | Andrew Lindsay; Ben Hunt-Davis; Simon Dennis; Louis Attrill; Luka Grubor; Kieran West; Fred Scarlett; Steve Trapmore | Rowley Douglas | Great Britain | 5:38.59 | QA |
| 2 | Gioacchino Cascone; Franco Berra; Mario Palmisano; Marco Penna; Valerio Pinton; Raffaello Leonardo; Alessandro Corona; Luca Ghezzi | Gaetano Iannuzzi | Italy | 5:41.23 | QA |
| 3 | Sergey Matveyev; Aleksandr Litvinchev; Pavel Melnikov; Andrey Glukhov; Dmitri Kovalev; Vladimir Volodenkov; Dmitry Rozinkevich; Anton Chermashentsev | Aleksandr Lukyanov | Russia | 5:43.88 | QB |
| 4 | Adri Middag; Peter van der Noort; Niels van der Zwan; Gerritjan Eggenkamp; Geert-Jan Derksen; Gijs Kind; Geert Cirkel; Nico Rienks | Merijn van Oijen | Netherlands | 5:44.91 | QB |

=== Finals ===
==== Final B ====
| Rank | Rowers | Coxswain | Nation | Time |
|---|---|---|---|---|
| 7 | Michael Belenkie; Bryan Donnelly; Matt Swick; Thomas Herschmiller; Lawrence Varga; Morgan Crooks; David Calder; Adam Parfitt | Chris Taylor | Canada | 5:36.30 |
| 8 | Adri Middag; Peter van der Noort; Niels van der Zwan; Gerritjan Eggenkamp; Geert-Jan Derksen; Gijs Kind; Geert Cirkel; Nico Rienks | Merijn van Oijen | Netherlands | 5:36.63 |
| 9 | Sergey Matveyev; Alexandre Litvintchev; Pavel Melnikov; Andrey Glukhov; Dmitri Kovalev; Vladimir Volodenkov; Dmitry Rozinkevich; Anton Chermashentsev | Aleksandr Lukyanov | Russia | 5:45.18 |

==== Final A ====
| Rank | Rowers | Coxswain | Nation | Time |
|---|---|---|---|---|
| 1st place, gold medalist(s) | Andrew Lindsay; Ben Hunt-Davis; Simon Dennis; Louis Attrill; Luka Grubor; Kieran West; Fred Scarlett; Steve Trapmore | Rowley Douglas | Great Britain | 5:33.08 |
| 2nd place, silver medalist(s) | Christian Ryan; Alastair Gordon; Nick Porzig; Rob Jahrling; Mike McKay; Stuart Welch; Daniel Burke; Jaime Fernandez | Brett Hayman | Australia | 5:33.88 |
| 3rd place, bronze medalist(s) | Igor Francetić; Tihomir Franković; Tomislav Smoljanović; Nikša Skelin; Siniša Skelin; Krešimir Čuljak; Igor Boraska; Branimir Vujević | Silvijo Petriško | Croatia | 5:34.85 |
| 4 | Gioacchino Cascone; Franco Berra; Mario Palmisano; Marco Penna; Valerio Pinton; Raffaello Leonardo; Alessandro Corona; Luca Ghezzi | Gaetano Iannuzzi | Italy | 5:35.37 |
| 5 | Bryan Volpenhein; Robert Kaehler; Porter Collins; Thomas Welsh; David Simon; Chris Ahrens; Garrett Miller; Jeffrey Klepacki | Peter Cipollone | United States | 5:39.16 |
| 6 | Costel Pavel Mutescu; Vasile Măstăcan; Cornel Nemțoc; Florian Tudor; Viorel Talapan; Andrei Bănică; Gheorghe Pîrvan; Dorin Alupei | Dumitru Răducanu | Romania | 5:43.89 |
