= Kieran West =

British rower

Kieran West MBE
Personal information
- Born: 18 September 1977 (age 48) Kingston upon Thames, London
Medal record
Men's rowing
Representing Great Britain
Olympic Games
Gold medal – first place	2000 Sydney	Eight
World Championships
Gold medal – first place	2002 Seville	Coxed four
Silver medal – second place	1999 St. Catharines	Eight
Silver medal – second place	2003 Milan	Coxed four

Kieran Martin West MBE (born 18 September 1977) is a retired English rower and Olympic champion who represented Great Britain.

== Education ==
Born in Kingston upon Thames, West was educated at Dulwich College, in south-east London, before going to Christ's College, Cambridge in 1995, to study for a BA in Economics and Land Economy, followed by a PGCE in Mathematics three years later. On graduating from his second degree he taught Mathematics at King's College School, Wimbledon for two years, before returning to his studies in 2004. Changing discipline, he first read for an MA in War Studies at King's College London, and then a PhD in First World War Strategy and Military Intelligence at Pembroke College, Cambridge.

== Sporting career ==
=== Early career ===
West was introduced to rowing by his father, Richard, and began coxing at Kingston Rowing Club aged 10. When he quickly outgrew this role he started sculling, and entered his first race in November 1989, going unbeaten for over 2 years. He won the National Rowing Championships in a single scull at his age category when 15, then trialled for the British under-18 rowing team. Although initially successful, he suffered a severe lower back injury and was forced to retire from sport for three years to undergo intensive physiotherapy.

=== The Boat Race ===
For his first two years at Cambridge West rehabilitated himself back into a boat, finally rowing again in spring 1997. After a term of rowing for his college in the May Bumps he rowed in the Cambridge Goldie crew in the 1998 Boat Race coxed by Olympian Suzie Ellis, losing to Isis by two and a third lengths.

West represented Great Britain for the first time in 1998, and made the Cambridge Blue Boat in 1999, rowing in the six seat, a position he would take in all his Cambridge crews. Considered by many to have been one of the fastest crews the Club had produced, Cambridge went on to win comfortably in the second fastest time in Boat Race history.

Selected to represent Great Britain again that summer, and with the opportunity to go to his first Olympic Games, West took a year out of his studies to concentrate on his rowing. While away he was elected President of the Cambridge University Boat Club for the 2001 Boat Race campaign. Despite having lost both the Boat Race and the Isis-Goldie Race in 2000, Cambridge comfortably beat Oxford exactly six months after West's Sydney final. Goldie also beat Isis that year, giving Cambridge the clean sweep, the last time this would happen for six years. West was subsequently voted 'Cambridge Sports Personality of the Year, 2000/2001'.

Although he initially finished at Cambridge in 2001, West returned in 2005 and rowed in the 2006 Boat Race. Cambridge were favourites for the 2006 Race but rough conditions on the day led to Cambridge taking on a significant amount of water and coming close to sinking, leaving Oxford to pull away to victory.

The following year, Cambridge were even stronger favourites and, with five returning members of the 2006 crew, were keen to put the record straight. After a tighter than expected early section of the race, Cambridge pulled away after twelve minutes to win. As the rules of the Boat Race state that no athlete can participate in more than four races as an undergraduate and four races as a graduate (the "Rankov Rule"), this was West's last for Cambridge. Throughout the season, the crew had been accompanied by an ethnographer, Mark De Rond, who subsequently wrote a book on the season's experiences, The Last Amateurs: To Hell and Back with the Cambridge Boat Race Crew.

West joined the British rowing team after the 2007 Boat Race, but retired from international rowing two months later to concentrate on his academic studies.

West's three wins from four Boat Races makes him one of the most successful Cambridge rowing Blues, after Chris Baillieu who won four from four, while the eight years between his first and last Cambridge appearances is the longest span in Boat Race history. West was also the first member of Cambridge University to win a gold medal at the Olympic Games while still a student.

=== International rowing ===
West's international rowing career began in 1998, when he competed for Great Britain with Mark Hunter in the Double Scull at the under-23 World Rowing Championships in Ioannina, Greece. The following year he was selected to row in the Men's Eight at the World Rowing Championships.

In 1999, he was selected as part of an eight, coached by Martin McElroy and Harry Mahon. It was second at all three regattas in the 1999 Rowing World Cup, broke the British record on two occasions and came close to breaking the world record. At the World Rowing Championships it briefly led the final, the first British eight ever to do so, before taking a silver medal behind the 1997 and 1998 World Champions, USA, the highest finish position of a British Eight at a World Rowing Championships.

West took a year out of his studies to concentrate on preparing for the 2000 Sydney Olympics. The crew had two changes from the previous year and was even more successful in the early season, taking two gold medals and one silver from the Rowing World Cup and becoming the first British Eight to win the event outright.

At the Olympic Games Britain were the joint favourites for the gold medal, alongside the USA, who had not raced internationally that season. A poor row in the first round, West's 23rd birthday, saw them lose to a strong Australian crew, but they won the repechage. In the final Britain led from start to finish to win the gold medal for the first time since the 1912 Stockholm Olympic Games, with West being the youngest member of the crew, and the first member of Cambridge University to win at the Olympics while still a student. Australia took the silver. The crew of Andrew Lindsay, Ben Hunt-Davis, Simon Dennis, Louis Attrill, Luka Grubor, Kieran West, Fred Scarlett, Steve Trapmore and Rowley Douglas were all subsequently awarded the MBE for "services to rowing" in the 2001 New Year Honours.

Though selected for the British Eight in 2001, West was unable to compete at the World Rowing Championships due to a rib injury followed by a shoulder injury sustained earlier that season. The following year West stroked the British Coxed Four to a gold medal at the 2002 World Rowing Championships in Seville. The crew also contained two of the 2000 British Eight, Luka Grubor and Steve Trapmore, and two members of the 2001 Cambridge Blue Boat, Tom Stallard and Christian Cormack. The following year West and Stallard were again in the Coxed Four and took a silver medal at the World Championships in Milan.

West continued rowing internationally for the next three years, in the Men's Eight at the 2004 Athens Olympics, stroking the Eight to fourth place at the 2005 World Championships in Gifu, and back in the six seat of the Eight at the 2006 World Championships in Eton. He retired from international rowing in March 2008.

=== Sporting achievements ===
In the course of his rowing career West won every major international and domestic rowing event: the Olympic Games, the World Rowing Championships, the Rowing World Cup, the Oxford-Cambridge Boat Race, the Head of the River Race, the Head of the River Fours, and he came out of retirement in 2008 to win the Visitors' Challenge Cup at Henley Royal Regatta, in a composite crew representing Imperial College London and Kingston Rowing Club.

West remains a member of Kingston Rowing Club. His last race was for Pembroke College Boat Club first men's eight, in the 6 seat, who were one of only two crews in the Mays first division to receive blades in 2009, the other being Magdalene College Boat Club.

West's older brother, Damian, is also an international oarsman, who rowed for Oxford University Boat Club in the 1996 Boat Race and for Great Britain from 1993 to 1997.

City of Cambridge Rowing Club owns a men's eight named in West's honour: Kieran West, MBE. The boat was originally owned by Christ's College, Cambridge, where West was studying during his first period at Cambridge.

== Personal life ==
West was born with a cleft lip and palate. On 8 August 2009, West married Lourina Pretorius a former student at Newnham College, Cambridge, from South Africa. The following month, he started work at McKinsey & Co. in London, where he was employed for eight years. He now works in private healthcare. The couple lives in Buckinghamshire and has two daughters.

== Sporting achievements ==
=== Olympic Games ===
- 2004 Athens – 9th, Eight
- 2000 Sydney – Gold, Eight

=== World Championships ===
- 2006 Eton – 5th, Eight
- 2005 Gifu – 4th, Eight
- 2003 Milan – Silver, Coxed Four
- 2002 Seville – Gold, Coxed Four
- 1999 St. Catharines – Silver, Eight

=== The Boat Race ===
- 2007 – Won
- 2006 – Lost
- 2001 – Won (President)
- 1999 – Won
