= Simon Dennis (rower) =

British rower

Medal record

Men's rowing

Representing Great Britain

Olympic Games
Gold medal – first place	2000 Sydney	Eight

Simon John Dennis MBE (born 24 August 1976) is a British rower and Olympic gold medalist. He was born in Henley-on-Thames, Oxfordshire. He started rowing at St Paul's School, London, coached by Michael Streat and his first international appearance was in 1994 in the GB eight at the World Rowing Junior Championships, winning a bronze medal. After school, he attended Imperial College London, winning two Henley Royal Regatta races with them.

He raced in the eight at the World Championships in 1997 and 1998, before rowing with Steve Williams in the coxless pair for the 1999 season, winning the Silver Goblets and Nickall's Challenge cup at Henley. In 2000, he returned to the men's eight which won a gold medal at the Sydney Olympics. He is now a teacher of Biology at Marlborough College in Wiltshire.

== Achievements ==
- Olympic Medals: 1 Gold
- World Championship Medals: 0
- Junior World Championship Medals: 1 Bronze

=== Olympic Games ===
- 2000 – Gold, Eight (with Andrew Lindsay, Ben Hunt-Davis, Louis Attrill, Luka Grubor, Kieran West, Fred Scarlett, Steve Trapmore, Rowley Douglas)

=== World Championships ===
- 2001 – 5th, Eight
- 1999 – 5th, Coxless Pair (with Steve Williams)
- 1998 – 7th, Eight
- 1997 – 4th, Eight

=== Junior World Championships ===
- 1994 – Bronze, Eight
