= Silvijo Petriško =

Croatian rower

Olympic medal record

Men's Rowing
Bronze medal – third place	2000 Sydney	Eights

Silvijo Petriško (born 20 November 1979 in Zagreb) is a Croatian rower, who won a bronze medal in the eights competition at the 2000 Summer Olympics in Sydney. He was the coxswain of the team, compromising Igor Francetić, Igor Boraska, Nikša Skelin, Siniša Skelin, Branimir Vujević, Krešimir Čuljak, Tomislav Smoljanović, and Tihomir Franković.
