= Oxford Brookes University Boat Club =

English university rowing club

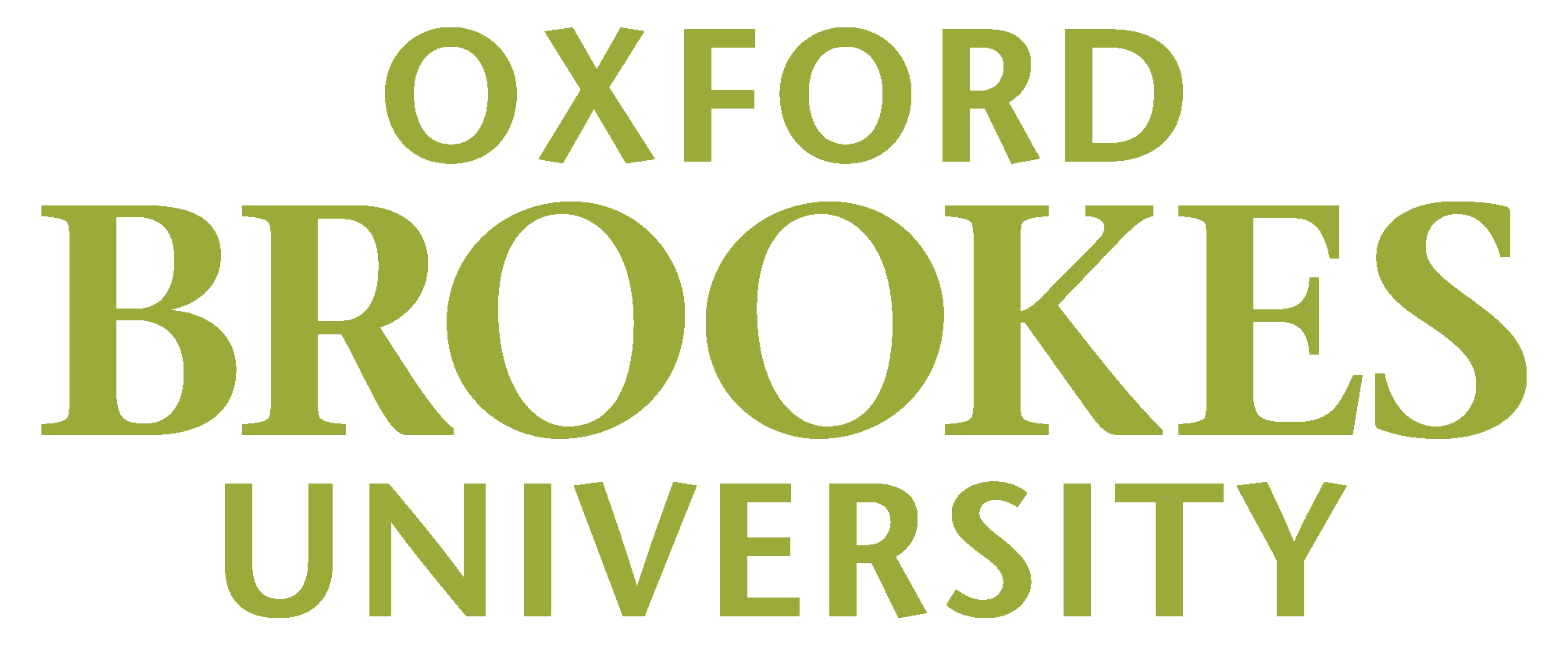

- Location: Wallingford, Oxford, (United Kingdom)
- Home water: River Thames
- Founded: 1978
- University: Oxford Brookes University
- Affiliations: British Rowing boat code - OBU; BUCS
- Website: brookesrowing.org.uk

Notable members
- Scott Durant, Olivia Carnegie-Brown, Peter Chambers, Richard Chambers, Alex Partridge, Caroline O'Connor, Steve Williams, Alastair Heathcote, Tom Lucy, Rowley Douglas, Fred Scarlett, Ben Hunt-Davis

Oxford Brookes University Boat Club
Medal record

Rowing

World U23 Championships

Representing Great Britain
Gold medal – first place	2025 Poznan, Poland	M8+ Richard Hawes
Gold medal – first place	2025 Poznan, Poland	M8+ Tom Bryce
Gold medal – first place	2025 Poznan, Poland	W8+ Olivia Hill
Gold medal – first place	2024 St Catherines, Canada	M8+ Louis Nares
Gold medal – first place	2024 St Catherines, Canada	M8+ Toby Lassen
Gold medal – first place	2024 St Catherines, Canada	M8+ Tom Bryce
Gold medal – first place	2024 St Catherines, Canada	4- Jake Wincomb
Gold medal – first place	2024 St Catherines, Canada	4- Fergus Woolnough
Gold medal – first place	2024 St Catherines, Canada	W8+ Olivia Hill
Gold medal – first place	2024 St Catherines, Canada	W8+ Rhianna Sumpter
Gold medal – first place	2024 St Catherines, Canada	W4- Grace Richards
Gold medal – first place	2024 St Catherines, Canada	W4- Arianna Forde
Gold medal – first place	2023 Plovdiv, Bulgaria	M8+ Tom Bryce
Gold medal – first place	2023 Plovdiv, Bulgaria	M8+ Fergus Woolnough
Gold medal – first place	2023 Plovdiv, Bulgaria	M8+ Louis Nares
Gold medal – first place	2023 Plovdiv, Bulgaria	M8+ Toby Lassen
Gold medal – first place	2023 Plovdiv, Bulgaria	4- Jake Wincomb
Gold medal – first place	2022 Varese, Italy	M8+ Matt Heywood
Gold medal – first place	2022 Varese, Italy	M8+ Jack Prior
Gold medal – first place	2022 Varese, Italy	M8+ Jake Wincomb
Gold medal – first place	2022 Varese, Italy	M8+ Scott Cockle
Gold medal – first place	2021 Prague, Czech Republic	M8+ Scott Cockle
Gold medal – first place	2019 Florida, USA	M8+ Matthew Rowe
Silver medal – second place	2019 Florida, USA	M4+ Scott Cockle
Silver medal – second place	2019 Florida, USA	W8+ Johanna Gannon
Silver medal – second place	2018 Poland	M4- Samuel Nunn
Silver medal – second place	2018 Poland	M8+ Matthew Aldridge
Silver medal – second place	2017 Bulgaria	M4+ Charlie Clarke
Bronze medal – third place	2017 Bulgaria	M8+ Matthew Aldridge
Bronze medal – third place	2017 Bulgaria	M8+ Morgan Bolding
Bronze medal – third place	2017 Bulgaria	M8+ Michael Glover
Bronze medal – third place	2016 Rotterdam	LM4- Ben Reeves
Silver medal – second place	2015 Bulgaria	LM4x Jamie Copus
Silver medal – second place	2015 Bulgaria	LM4x Joel Cassells
Bronze medal – third place	2015 Bulgaria	LM4- Ben Reeves
Bronze medal – third place	2015 Bulgaria	W8+ Annie Withers
Silver medal – second place	2014 Italy	LM4- Jamie Copus
Silver medal – second place	2014 Italy	LM4- Joel Cassells
Silver medal – second place	2013 Austria	LM4- Joel Cassells
Gold medal – first place	2012 Lithuania	M2- Matthew Tarrant
Silver medal – second place	2012 Lithuania	W2- Olivia Carnegie-Brown
Gold medal – first place	2011 Amsterdam	LM2- Peter Chambers
Bronze medal – third place	2011 Amsterdam	M8+ Matthew Tarrant
Bronze medal – third place	2011 Amsterdam	M8+ Oliver Staite

Olympic Games

Representing Great Britain
Gold medal – first place	2024 Paris	M8+ Harry Brightmore
Gold medal – first place	2024 Paris	M8+ Rory Gibbs
Gold medal – first place	2024 Paris	M8+ Morgan Bolding
Gold medal – first place	2024 Paris	M8+ Tom Digby
Bronze medal – third place	2024 Paris	M4- Matt Aldridge
Bronze medal – third place	2024 Paris	M4- Freddie Davidson
Bronze medal – third place	2024 Paris	M4- David Ambler
Bronze medal – third place	2024 Paris	M4- Oli Wilkes
Bronze medal – third place	2024 Paris	W4- Esme Booth
Gold medal – first place	2024 Paris	PR3 Mix4- Frankie Allen
Gold medal – first place	2016 Rio	M8+ Scott Durant
Silver medal – second place	2016 Rio	W8+ Olivia Carnegie-Brown
Silver medal – second place	2012 London	LM4- Peter Chambers
Silver medal – second place	2012 London	LM4- Richard Chambers
Bronze medal – third place	2012 London	M8+ Alex Partridge
Gold medal – first place	2008 Beijing	M4- Steve Williams
Silver medal – second place	2008 Beijing	M8+ Alex Partridge
Silver medal – second place	2008 Beijing	M8+ Alastair Heathcote
Silver medal – second place	2008 Beijing	M8+ Tom Lucy
Gold medal – first place	2004 Athens	M4- Steve Williams
Gold medal – first place	2000 Sydney	M8+ Rowley Douglas
Gold medal – first place	2000 Sydney	M8+ Fred Scarlett
Gold medal – first place	2000 Sydney	M8+ Ben Hunt-Davis

Oxford Brookes University Boat Club (known as Brookes especially verbally and as OBUBC in formal print) is the rowing club of Oxford Brookes University, England. Its large base is on the longest reach of the non-tidal parts of the Thames, at Wallingford, in Oxfordshire – about 6 miles (10 km) of easily rowable, little-congested river. The club has been very successful at pre-training and co-training many Olympic competitors including those for Great Britain who won 6 golds at Olympics spread across three consecutive games, starting with the games of 2000.

From 1995 into 2007, inclusive, Brookes won its record 13 consecutive British Universities Sport Association (annual BUSA games) men's eight wins.

== History ==
The club was founded in 1978 as the Oxford Polytechnic Boat Club (OPBC) where it was given its first home with Oxford Falcon Rowing and Canoeing Club and begun to enter competitions as a composite Polytechnic/Falcon crew. In the 2020 work The Umpires' Handbook the blade colours of the club are: burgundy, navy & cream, as is the kit. Due to the rarity of two of these colours the cream is in some kit and/or blades left as white and the burgundy (13% blue, 50% red) made up as maroon.

=== Path to a 1993 Henley Royal Regatta cup ===
In 1981, OPBC made its first qualification to Henley Royal Regatta (HRR). The crew was knocked out in the first round of The Ladies Challenge Plate In 1990, the Henley Regatta Stewards offered a new event for students of single colleges and schools, the Henley Prize. OPBC had a talented crew who had taken the bronze medal in the Senior A eights at Ghent, and lost the final of the Marlow Regatta Open 8's to Imperial by a few feet after OPBC were impeded by Walton RC rowing in a front-loader 8. At Henley, OPBC met Imperial in the Semi-final. Imperial led by nearly a length at the Barrier but OPBC began to pull back through. At Fawley OPBC pushed, closing the gap to a canvas when one of the crew caught a crab. Imperial jumped to a 2 1/2 length lead with the OPBC crew giving chase. Down the enclosures the lead was reduced to a canvas but IC held on to win. The 2 man of the IC boat Pete Riley was utterly exhausted in the race and had to be removed from the boat by the emergency launch. IC raced the final with a substitute as Riley was judged un-fit to row. IC won the final comfortably with the Stewards awarding Riley an extra medal as he "had rowed in the real final." In 1991 with 6 of the 1990 boat returning OPBC fell at the quarter-final stage to Nipon University. In 1992, the Henley Prize had been renamed the Temple Challenge Cup and OPBC returned with a new crew. Disaster hit OPBC A in the second round when the stroke's seat jammed on the first stroke. The crew battled down the course with 7 men but were eliminated. By 1993 Oxford Polytechnic had become Oxford Brookes University, but the boat club still raced in "Poly Blue." In the final, Brookes met Trinity College Dublin, winning a glorious race by 3 1/4 lengths.

=== 2000 to 2008 Olympians ===
2000 marked the first Olympic success of a chunk of the men's squad: Ben Hunt-Davis, Fred Scarlett and Rowley Douglas won gold medals in the Men's Eights at Sydney. Steve Williams achieved gold at the World Championships, along with Alex Partridge who won U23 gold.

Williams went on to win gold at the Athens Olympics and did so four years later. He won a World Championship event in 2005 with Partidge.

In the 2008 Beijing Olympics Alastair Heathcote, Tom Lucy and Partridge won silver. Carla Ashford and Caroline O'Connor powered into fifth in the final of the women's eight.

=== 2009 to date, highlights ===
In 2009, Brookes beat Yale to the Prince Albert Challenge Cup at HRR.

London 2012 saw further success with the Chambers brothers of Peter and Richard gaining two silver medals in the LM4-. Partridge gained a bronze in the M8+.

In 2014, Brookes brought HRR's Temple back to Britain for the first time since 2006, winning against the freshmen crew from Brown. They repeated this two years later – atoning their narrow quarter-final loss in 2015 (deemed 'the Temple final on the Friday') to eventual winners A.S.R. Nereus (of the Netherlands) – by beating the 2V crew from Harvard.

In 2017, Brookes went one step further again – after setting a new course record in Ghent, as well as a domestic national record of 5:30 at Eton Dorney. They won the Temple with an entirely new crew. Thus they won for the third year in four, and snatched the Ladies' Challenge Plate (for men) with the 2016 crew. This particular double at HRR was a first for any university boat club.

In 2021, the club won the blue riband event at the HRR, the Grand Challenge Cup. They won five other events: the Ladies', Stewards', Silver Goblets, the Island and the Visitors'.

== Boat House ==
The Oxford Brookes New Boat House is located on a 10 km non-tidal stretch of the River Thames. The length and width of the water allows men's and women's crews to train together.

In June 2013 marked the opening of the new boat house on the thames designed by architects Spratley Studios. The vision was to expand and update an outgrown, outdated building to produce a state-of-the-art facility, fit to support the demands of World and Olympic medallists and create an environment in which top-class athletes can shine. The contemporary interpretation of local agricultural buildings, compliant with stringent environmental and ecological benchmarks, underpins the concept. The simplistic gable form echoes a resplendent Tithe Barn on the banks of the Thames, a discreet silhouette within the landscape.

The new facilities include land-based training areas, extra boat storage and large changing rooms.

== Taurus Boat Club ==
Taurus Boat Club is the Alumni club of Oxford Brookes University. The Taurus Boat Club is for past oarsmen and oarswomen that were former alumni of Oxford Polytechnic & Oxford Brookes University with the allowance of current Brookes welcomed to join. Taurus won the Britannia Challenge Cup at Henley Royal Regatta in 2013.

== Honours ==
=== British champions ===
Year	Winning crew/s
1999	Men 4-
2002	Men 8+, Women 4+
2006	Open 8+, Women 4-
2007	Women 8+
2011	Open 2-
2012	Open 2-
2015	Open 8+
2018	Open 8+

Key = 2, 4, 8 (crew size), x (sculls), - (coxless), + (coxed)

=== Henley Royal Regatta ===
Year	Races won (shortened, thus unofficial name, prefixed 'the')
1993	Temple
1995	Temple
1996	Britannia
1997	Ladies'
1998	Britannia
1999	Silver Goblets & Nickalls'; Visitors'
2000	Visitors'; Prince Philip
2001	Visitors' (with Taurus); Prince Philip
2002	Remenham; Prince Philip
2004	Visitors'
2006	Visitors'; Temple
2009	Prince of Wales
2012	Visitors'
2013	Stewards'; Britannia (note: Taurus BC only); Remenham
2014	Temple
2016	Temple
2017	Ladies' (with Taurus); Temple
2018	Ladies'
2019	Stewards'; Ladies'; Temple
2021	Grand; Ladies'; Silver Goblets & Nickalls'; Stewards'; Island; Visitors'
2022	Grand (with Leander); Temple; Prince Albert
2023	Grand (with Leander); Stewards'; Ladies'; Visitors'; Island; Temple; Prince Albert
2024	Grand (with Taurus); Remenham; Stewards'; Temple; Island; Prince Albert

== See also ==
- Oxford Brookes University
- University rowing (UK)
- Rowing on the River Thames
