= Nick Porzig =

Nicholas Porzig
Personal information
- Born: 1 July 1972 (age 53) Cape Town, South Africa
- Education: St Stithians College SA; Hale School, AUST; Curtin University

Sport
- Sport: Rowing
- Club: Curtin University Rowing Club
Medal record
Men's rowing
Representing Australia
Olympic Games
Silver medal – second place	2000 Sydney	Eight
Commonwealth Rowing Championships
Gold medal – first place	1994 Ontario	Coxed four

Nicholas Weston Porzig (born 1 July 1972 in Cape Town) is a South African-born, former Australian representative, and former rower. He is a dual Olympian and an Olympic silver medalist.

== Club and state rowing ==
Porzig learned to row at St Stithians College in Johannesburg, under Paul Jackson who later coached national South African crews. In 1989, Porzig's family emigrated to Perth, Australia, where he continued to row at Hale School. Porzig's senior rowing was from the Curtin University Rowing Club where he was coached by Tony Lovrich who ran a successful high performance sweep men's squad.

Porizg first made state selection for Western Australia in the 1991 youth eight which contested the Noel Wilkinson Trophy at the Australian Rowing Championships. In 1992 he was selected in the West Australian senior eight contesting the King's Cup at the Interstate Regatta. That eight placed second behind a stellar Victorian crew which included all four members of Australia's prominent crew of the time - the Oarsome Foursome. Porzig rowed in further West Australian King's Cup eights crew in 1993, 1994, 1995, 1996. For the last four of those years he was seated in WA King's Cup eights with his younger brother David Porzig.

In 1993, Porzig applied for and won a scholarship to the Australian Institute of Sport in Canberra. During his senior Australian representative years, Porzig was selected in Australian Capital Territory eights to contest the King's Cup at the Interstate Regatta. He raced in the victorious ACT King's Cup eight of 1997 and in further ACT eights in 1998 and 1999.

== International representative rowing ==
At the Australian Institute of Sport in 1993 Porzig was initially paired with Robert Jahrling and they won their early 5 km time trials beating other combinations of their cohort. Nevertheless coach Reinhold Batschi changed out the combination and paired Porzig with Jaime Fernandez.

Porzig made his Australian representative debut in the seven seat of the men's eight who competed at the 1993 World Rowing Championships in Racize, Croatia and placed fourth. In 1994 Batschi selected and coached Porzing and Fernandez in the Australian coxed four with David Weightman, Shane McLaughlin and Brett Hayman on the rudder. They placed fifth at the World Championships in Indianapolis. That four also contested and won gold at the 1994 Commonwealth Regatta in Ontario, Canada held alongside the 1994 Commonwealth Games.

In 1995 Porzig was back in the Australian eight where he would stay for the rest of national representative career. At the 1995 World Rowing Championships in Tampere Finland and stroked by Rob Scott they finish overall eleventh. Porzig, Fernandez, Jahrling, Hayman and Ben Dodwell remained in the Australian eight into the 1996 Olympic year and were joined in the crew by the Stewart twins and the New South Wales pair of Walker and Wearne taking over in the stern end. At the 1996 Atlanta Olympics the Australian eight rowed to a sixth place.

Following a post-Olympic break Porzig stepped back into the eight for the 1998 World Rowing Championships in Cologne where they rowed to a sixth placing. In 1999 the crew raced at the World Rowing Cup III before contesting the 1999 World Rowing Championships in St Catharine's Canada where they missed the A final and finished in seventh place. His brother David had gained a seat in the Australian eight in 1997 and they raced together in that boat in 1998 and 1999.

In 2000 the Australian eight qualified for the Olympics and raced at two Rowing World Cups in the lead up campaign as well as at the Henley Royal Regatta where they raced as an Australian Institute of Sport eight and won that year's Grand Challenge Cup. Porzig was in the two seat of the eight with his old AIS training mates Jahrling and Fernandez. They were joined by Christian Ryan, Alastair Gordon, Stuart Welch, Daniel Burke, the champion Mike McKay with Hayman on the rudder. At Sydney 2000 the Australian eight won their heat in a pace that blew away the eventual gold medallists Great Britain. However in the final they started slowly and their late sprint home left them 0.8 seconds behind the Brits at the line and taking the silver Olympic medal in a thrilling finish. It was the final representative appearance for Nick Porzig.
