= Imperial College Boat Club =

British university rowing club

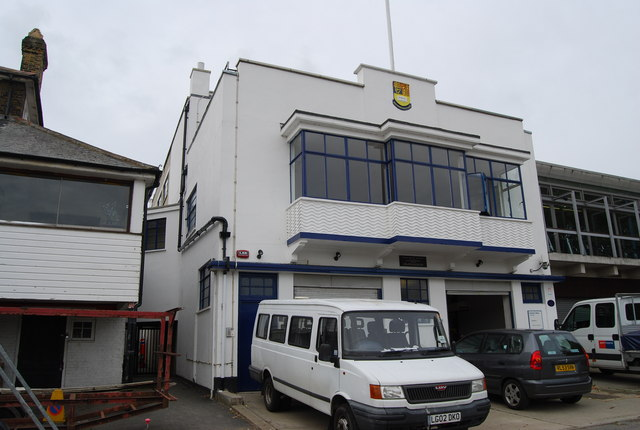

- Location: Putney, London, England
- Coordinates: 51°28′11.8″N 0°13′15.3″W
- Home water: River Thames, London
- Founded: 1919
- Key people: Dave Loveday (Head Coach) Adam Berry (Boatman) Tessa Millar (Coach)
- University: Imperial College
- Affiliations: British Rowing; Boat Code - IMP
- Website: imperialboatclub.co.uk

Imperial College Boat Club (ICBC) is the rowing club for Imperial College and has its boat house on the River Thames on the Putney embankment, London, United Kingdom. The alumni also run a boat club which is known as the Queen's Tower Boat Club and both crews occasionally row together as a composite in competition. The club has been home to numerous National Squad oarsmen and women and is open to students of Imperial College London. It had a prestigious history of racing, having won Henley Royal Regatta 25 times and presently holding The Prince Albert Challenge Cup. ICBC also holds the distinction of having won The Prince Albert Challenge Cup a record five times.

== History ==
The club was formed in 1919 and initially shared facilities with Thames Rowing Club but has had its own boathouse since 1938.

The club has been successful in competitions, with many wins at Henley Royal Regatta including in 2026 with victory in The Prince Albert Challenge Cup event.

The gold medal-winning Great Britain eight at the 2000 Sydney Olympics were based at Imperial College's refurbished boathouse and included three alumni of the college, along with their coach Martin McElroy.

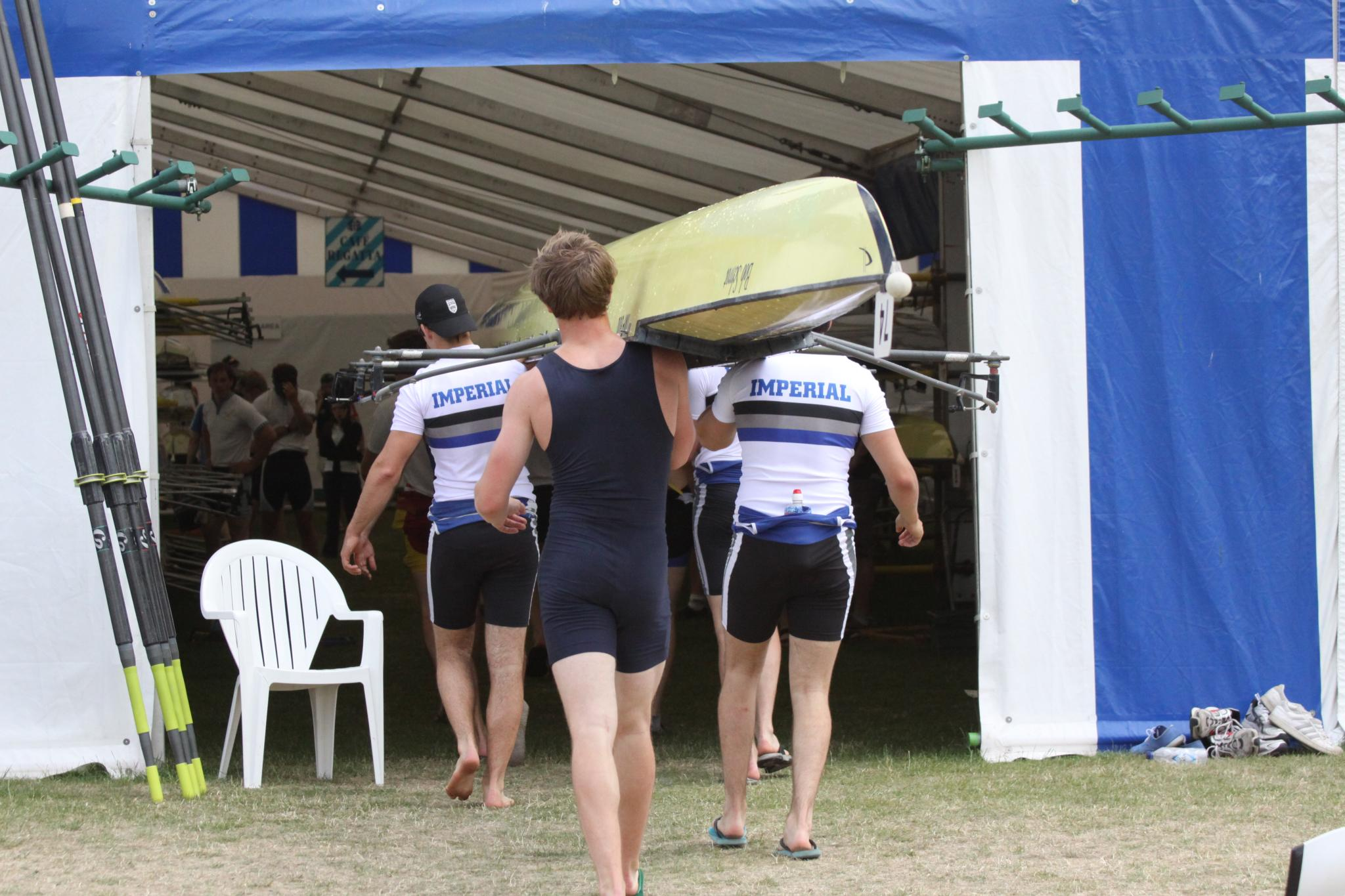
Henley Royal Regatta 2010

Until 2008, the head coach was Simon Cox who, after taking over from Simon Dennis in 2005, went on to coach the Henley Royal Regatta winning crew in 2006, before taking up a position with Swiss Rowing. His replacement was Olympic Gold Medallist Steve Trapmore who coached the club until September 2010, when he moved on to coach Cambridge University Boat Club. Don McLachlan took over from 2010 until leaving in April 2013 to become lead coach at Rowing Ireland, just before the club won Henley Royal Regatta again a few months later.

== Coaching ==
The most well-known of Imperial College Boat Club's coaches was Bill Mason, a former Olympic oarsman himself and for many years was head coach and director of rowing at Imperial College BC. In that time he was responsible for numerous Henley Royal Regatta and Henley Women's Regatta wins. He coached athletes at the club from novices up to international and developed the club substantially during his time in charge.

== Major event wins and international competition ==
Henley Royal Regatta wins
Year	Event	Crew
2026	The Prince Albert Challenge Cup	
2022	The Remenham Challenge Cup	
2018	The Prince Albert Challenge Cup	
2017	Visitors’ Challenge Cup	
2013	The Prince Albert Challenge Cup	J.C.Rankin, H.C.J.Goodier, B.R.Spencer-Jones, T.P.Richards, cox: E.J.Smith, coach: Stuart Whitelaw
2011	Visitors' Challenge Cup	J. Kirkwood
2010	Visitors' Challenge Cup	J. Kirkwood
2008	Visitors' Challenge Cup	G. Whittaker, S.Hislop, coach: Steve Trapmore
2006	The Prince Albert Challenge Cup	B. Smith, O. Moore, W. Laughton, O. Tietz, cox: A. Williams (setting record) coach: Simon Cox
2004	Men's Student Coxed Fours	S.Hislop, G. Whittaker, H. Mackenzie, E. Johnson, cox:S. Pierce, coach: Simon Dennis and Bill Mason
2002	Visitors Challenge Cup	D. Marett, D. Gillard, coach: Bill Mason
1998	Temple Challenge Cup	J. Davenport, S.P. Jones, P.J.E. Holt, A.S. Virgo, N.P. Atkins, R.D. Sanders, R.J. Dennis, A.F. Shuttleworth, cox M.C. Crossman, coach: Bill Mason
1996	Grand Challenge Cup	S. Wall, D. Gillard, S. Dennis, L. Attrill, L. Grubor, R. Dunn, M. Kettle, P.Wilson, cox: J.Goodwin, coach: Martin McElroy
1995	Thames Challenge Cup	L. Attrill, T. Gale, J. Botterill, A. Kershaw, A. Warnock, P. Wilson, S. Dennis, R. Lucas, cox: J. Goodwin, coach: Martin McElroy (new record time)
1994	Temple Challenge Cup	J. Wells, G. Ingram, J. Einthoven, L. Attrill, J. Moore, A. Ryder, J. Botterill, J. Bichard, cox:J. Goodwin, coach: Bill Mason
1994	Visitors Challenge Cup	B. Poulton, E. Wild, A. Green, M. Kettle, coach: Bill Mason
1992	Ladies' Challenge Plate	L. Morgan, D. Forster, E. Wild, A. Green, L. Grubor, J. Waller, S. Ellis, B. Poulton, cox:C. Boon, coach: Bill Mason (new record time)
1992	Temple Challenge Cup	C. Parks, P. Reilly, K. Foreman, J. Bichard, M. Kettle, T. Miller, S. Puttick, T. Beddoe, cox A. Coddrington, coach: Bill Mason (new record time)
1990	Henley Prize (later renamed Temple Challenge Cup)	coach: Bill Mason
1987	Visitors Challenge Cup	C. Behrens, J. Waller, G. Pooley, J. Walker coach: Bill Mason
1985	Visitors Challenge Cup	G. Pooley, A. Spalding, G. Harding, K Steinlechner, coach: Bill Mason
1978	Ladies' Challenge Plate	S. Hackett, C Howell, I Birch, A Reynolds, W Edgerley, C Southall, A Cooper, S Hall, cox S Illman, coaches N James, P Summers
1968	Visitors Challenge Cup	
1946	Thames Challenge Cup	
1923	Wyfold Challenge Cup	

Henley Women's Regatta wins
Year	Event	Crew
2023	Aspirational Single Scull	
2023	Elite Coxless Pair	
2023	Academic Coxless Four	
2021	Academic Coxless Four	
2015	Elite Lightweight Pairs	J. Hubbard, N. Mason, coach: Jamie Low
2006	Senior Eights	S. Supponen, R. Davies, C. Mynhardt, C. Greenhalgh, N. Smith, R. Bradbury, G. Bradbury, M. Petronikolos, cox:J. Fukuta, coach: Bill Mason
2006	Elite Lightweight Singles	M. Pauls, coach: Bill Mason
2005	Intermediate Coxed Fours	S. Supponen, C. Greenhalgh, N. Smith, N. Evans, cox:L. Sutcliffe, coach: Laura Middleton
2005	FISA Senior B Lwt 1x	R. Davies, coach: Laura Middleton
2001	Club Coxed Fours	T. King, E. Williams, J. Taylor, P. Keegan, cox:J. Ellis, coach: Tony Reynolds
2001	Elite Lightweight Singles	A. Eastman
2000	College Eights	C. Coats, R. Stainforth, J. Taylor, T. King, P. Keegan, E. Williams, A. Eastman, coach: Bill Mason and Andy Green
1997	College Eights and Invitation University Eights	S. Davies, R. Dixon, J. Williams, M. Hirsch, A. Trickey, J. Belbeck, K. Jourdan, A. McDonald, cox N. Tan, coach: Guy Ingram
1996	Club Eights	H. James, J. Belbeck, A. Smith, K. Wehrheim, A. Trickey, S. Khan, K. Jourdan, A. McDonald, cox N. Tan, coach: Guy Ingram (new record time)

Great Britain Rowing Olympic vests
Year	Competition	Event	Result	Crew
2016	Rio Olympic Games	Women's Eight	Silver	M. Wilson, Z. Lee
2012	London Olympic Games	Women's Quad	6th	M. Wilson
2012	London Olympic Games	Men's Lwt Reserve		A. Freeman-Pask
2004	Athens Olympic Games	Men's Pair	7th	R. Dunn
2004	Athens Olympic Games	Men's Eight	9th	D. Ouseley
2000	Sydney Olympic Games	Men's Eight	Gold	L. Attrill, S. Dennis, L. Grubor, coach: Martin McElroy
2000	Sydney Olympic Games	Reserve		R. Dunn
1996	Atlanta Olympic Games	Lwt Reserve		S. Ellis
1996	Atlanta Olympic Games	Men's Eight	8th	J. Walker
1996	Atlanta Olympic Games	Hwt Reserve		G. Pooley
1992	Barcelona Olympic Games	Men's Eight	6th	J. Walker
1992	Barcelona Olympic Games	Men's Quad Scull	13th	G. Pooley

Great Britain Rowing Senior International vests
Year	Competition	Event	Result	Crew
2015	World Championships – Aiguebelette	Men's Lwt Coxless Pair	Gold	S. Scrimgeour
2015	World Championships – Aiguebelette	Men's Coxed Pair	Gold	H. Fieldman
2015	World Championships – Aiguebelette	Women's Eight	4th	Z. Lee, D. Etiebet
2015	World Championships – Aiguebelette	Women's Quad	8th	M. Wilson
2009	World Championships – Poznan	Men's Lwt Coxless Pair	5th	O. Mahony, coach: Steve Trapmore
2009	World Championships – Poznan	Men's Lwt Eight (Germany)	6th	O. Tietz
2009	World Championships – Poznan	Men's Lwt Single Scull	8th	A. Freeman-Pask, coach: Steve Trapmore
2008	World Championships – Linz	Men's Lwt Single Scull	13th	A. Freeman-Pask
2008	World Championships – Linz	Women's Lwt Single Scull	9th	M. Pauls
2007	World Championships – Munich	Women's Lwt Quadruple Scull	2nd	M. Pauls
2006	World Championships – Dorney	Men's Coxed Four	5th	S. Pearce
2003	World Championships – Milan	Men's Coxless Four	Silver	R. Dunn
2002	World Championships – Seville	Men's Coxless Four	Silver	R. Dunn
2002	World Championships – Seville	Men's Coxed Four	Gold	L. Grubor
2002	World Championships – Seville	Men's Coxless Four	Silver	R. Dunn
2001	World Championships – Lucerne	Men's Coxless Four	Gold	R. Dunn
2001	World Championships – Lucerne	Men's Eight	5th	L. Attrill, S. Dennis, L. Grubor, coach: Martin McElroy
2000	World Championships – Zagreb	Men's Coxed Four	Gold	R. Dunn
1999	World Championships – St. Catharines	Men's Eight	Silver	L. Attrill, L. Grubor, coach: Martin McElroy
1999	World Championships – St. Catharines	Men's Coxed Four	Silver	R. Dunn
1999	World Championships – St. Catharines	Men's Pair	5th	S. Dennis
1998	World Championships – Cologne	Men's Eight	7th	L. Attrill, coach: Martin McElroy
1998	World Championships – Cologne	Men's Coxed Four	8th	R. Dunn, M. Hussey
1997	World Championships – Aiguebellette	Men's Eight	4th	L. Attrill, R. Dunn, S. Dennis, coach: Martin McElroy
1994	World Championships – Indionapolis	Lwt Eight	Gold	S. Ellis

Great Britain Rowing U23 International vests
Year	Competition	Event	Result	-
2015	U23 Worlds – Plovdiv	Women's Double	4th	G. Francis
2014	U23 Worlds – Varese	Women's Eight	Silver	G. Francis
2014	U23 Worlds – Varese	Lwt Four	Silver	T. Richards
2014	U23 Worlds – Varese	Lwt Pair	Silver	W. Kimberley
2013	U23 Worlds – Linz	Lwt Four	Silver	T. Richards
2013	U23 Worlds – Linz	Lwt Pair	Silver	W.Kimberley
2013	U23 Worlds – Linz	Women's Lwt Quad	Bronze	R. Atkinson
2012	U23 Worlds – Trakai	Lwt Pair	4th	W. Kimberley
2012	U23 Worlds – Trakai	Lwt Quad	9th	T. Richards
2011	U23 Worlds – Amsterdam	Lwt Four	7th	J. Kirkwood
2011	U23 Worlds – Amsterdam	Lwt Quad	7th	J. Butler, W. Kimberley
2011	U23 Worlds – Amsterdam	Coxed Four	5th	H. Goodier
2010	U23 Worlds – Brest	Women's Four	4th	L. Howard-Merrill
2010	U23 Worlds – Brest	Lwt Four	GOLD	J. Kirkwood
2010	U23 Worlds – Brest	Men's Eight	Bronze	H. Fieldman
2009	U23 Worlds – Roudnice	Men's Eight	Bronze	H. Fieldman
2007	U23 Worlds – Strathclyde	Coxless Four	Bronze	O. Moore
2007	U23 Worlds – Strathclyde	Lwt Quad	5th	A. Freeman-Pask
2007	U23 Worlds – Strathclyde	Men's Eight	6th	W. Laughton
2007	U23 Worlds – Strathclyde	Men's Single Scull	11th	B.Smith
2006	U23 Worlds – Hazewinkel	Coxless Pair	Bronze	B. Smith, O. Moore, coach: S. Pearce
2003	U23 Worlds – Belgrade	Coxless Four	11th	G. Whittaker, E. Johnson
2002	U23 Worlds – Genoa	Coxless Four	7th	A. Rivers
2000	U23 Nations Cup – Copenhagen	Coxed Four	GOLD	A. Rivers, A. Warner
2000	U23 Nations Cup – Copenhagen	Coxless Four	7th	S. Jones
1996	U23 Nations Cup – Hazewinkel	Coxless Four	GOLD	L. Attrill, S. Dennis, R. Dunn, S. Eyre, coach: Martin McElroy
1995	U23 Nations Cup – Groningen	Men's Eight	9th	L. Attrill, S. Dennis, T. Gale, A. Kershaw, A. Warnock, coach: Martin McElroy

Wingfield Sculls
Year	Event	Champion	Time
2015	Men's Champion	T. Richards	21.40
2014	Men's Champion	T. Richards	21.06
	Women's Champion	M. Wilson	21.31
2011	Men's Champion	A. Freeman-Pask	19.41 (record)

National champions
Year	Competition
1978	Men 2+
1985	Men lightweight 4-
1991	Men lightweight 4-
1996	Men 2- (with Queen's Tower) (QT)
1997	Women 4- Women 8+ (both with QT) Men 2-, Men 4x (both QT only)
1998	Women 4+, Men 2+ (QT only), Men 4x (QT only)
1999	Men 1x, Men 2x, Women 2 (All QT only)
2002	Women 2-
2004	Open 8+
2008	Women 4x
2014	Women 2x, Women 4x, Women 4-
2015	Women 2x, Women 8+

== Notable members ==
- Henry Fieldman

== See also ==
- Rowing on the River Thames
- University rowing in the United Kingdom
