= Anzulović =

Anzulović is a surname. Notable people with the surname include:

- Branimir Anzulović (1926–2001), Croatian American cultural historian
- Dražen Anzulović (born 1967), Croatian basketball player and coach
- Marija Anzulović (born 1968), Croatian volleyball player
- Vladimir Anzulović (born 1978), Croatian basketball player and coach
