= Daničić =

Daničić is a Croatian and Serbian surname. The surname may refer to:

- Daničić (Uskok family), the well-known Uskok family from Senj that was prominent in the 15th-18th century
- Adolf Daničić (1861–1929), Croatian industrialist
- Damjan Daničić (born 2000), Serbian footballer
- Đuro Daničić (1825–1882), Serbian philologist
- Goran Daničić (1962–2021), Serbian actor
- Patricia Daničić (born 1978), Croatian volleyball player
