= Dmitry Kovalyov =

Dmitry Kovalyov may refer to:

- Dmitry Kovalyov (handballer) (born 1982), Russian handball player
- Dmitry Kovalyov (rower) (born 1976), Russian rower
- Dmitry Kovalëv (volleyball) (born 1991), Russian volleyball player
