= Michael Belenkie =

Canadian rower

Personal information
- Born: 21 November 1974 (age 51) Calgary, Alberta, Canada

Sport
- Sport: Rowing

Michael Belenkie (born 21 November 1974) is a Canadian rower and businessman. He competed in the men's eight event at the 2000 Summer Olympics.
