= Lawrence Varga =

Canadian rower

Personal information
- Nationality: Canadian
- Born: 4 August 1972 (age 52); Port Alberni, British Columbia, Canada

Sport
- Sport: Rowing

Lawrence Varga (born 4 August 1972) is a Canadian rower. He competed in the men's eight event at the 2000 Summer Olympics.
