= Gijs Kind =

Dutch rower

Personal information
- Nationality: Dutch
- Born: 12 January 1972 (age 53) 's-Gravenzande, Netherlands

Sport
- Sport: Rowing

Gijs Kind (born 12 January 1972) is a Dutch rower. He competed in the men's eight event at the 2000 Summer Olympics.
