= Thomas Welsh (rower) =

American rower (born 1977)

Medal record

Men's rowing

Representing United States

World Rowing Championships
Gold medal – first place	1998 Cologne	M8+
Gold medal – first place	1999 St. Catharines	M8+

Thomas Welsh (born May 6, 1977 in Philadelphia, Pennsylvania) is an American rower. He won gold in the men's eight at the 1998 and 1999 World Championships, and finished 5th in the men's eight at the 2000 Summer Olympics. He graduated from Princeton University with a degree in electrical engineering in 1999.

== See also ==
- Princeton University Olympians
