= Beti Rimac =

Croatian volleyball player (born 1976)

Personal information
- Nationality: Croatian
- Born: 14 January 1976 (age 50)
- Height: 1.91 m (6 ft 3 in)
- Weight: 75 kg (165 lb)

Career
Years	Teams
1990–1995; 1995–1997; 1997–1999; 1999–2000; 2000–2001; 2001–2002; 2002–2003; 2003–2007	ŽOK Pula; ŽOK Rijeka; ŽOK Dubrovnik; ŽOK Kaštela; ASPTT Mulhouse; Rio Marsì Palermo; ŽOK Vukovar–Vinkovci; ŽOK Šibenik

National team
2000	Croatia

Beti Rimac (born 14 January 1976 in Pula) is a Croatian former volleyball player.

She began playing volleyball in her hometown for ŽOK Pula, and, showing her talent since the early age, she became a member of the first team at the age of 14. She played for the club from 1990 to 1995. Between 1995 and 1997, she played for the team in the neighboring city of Rijeka, at the time when they were building a team that would eventually win two national championship titles (but without Rimac). In 1997, she moved to Dubrovnik to play for OK Dubrovnik Dubrovačka banka which won the triple crown in 1999, having won the national cup and championship and the European Champions League. That year, Dubrovačka banka was declared the best Croatian women's team by the Croatian Olympic Committee and Sportske novosti.

After a 1999/2000 stint in ŽOK Kaštela, Rimac moved abroad to play for French ASPTT Mulhouse for the 2000/2001 season and Italian Rio Marsi in 2001/2002. She then returned to Croatia, playing a year for ŽOK Vukovar–Vinkovci. Between 2003 and 2007, she played for ŽOK Šibenik, where she ended the professional career.

She competed with the Croatia women's national volleyball team at the 2000 Summer Olympics in Sydney, Australia, finishing 7th.

== See also ==
- Croatia at the 2000 Summer Olympics
