= Croatian Medical Journal =

- Discipline: Medicine
- Language: English
- Edited by: Tomislav Smoljanović

Publication details
- Former name: Acta Facultatis Medicae Zagrabiensis
- History: 1953–present
- Publisher: Medicinska naklada (Croatia)
- Frequency: Bimonthly
- Open access: Diamond
- Impact factor: 1.619 (2016)

Standard abbreviations
- ISO 4: Croat. Med. J.

Indexing
- CODEN: CMEJEN
- ISSN: 0353-9504 (print); 1332-8166 (web)
- OCLC no.: 648911316

Links
- Journal homepage; Online archive

The Croatian Medical Journal (abbreviated CMJ) is a bimonthly peer-reviewed diamond open access general medical journal. It was established in 1953 as the Acta Facultatis Medicae Zagrabiensis, obtaining its current name in 1992. Its first issue under its current title was published in February 1992, and it has been published by Medicinska naklada since 2001. It was previously published by the University of Zagreb School of Medicine. The editor-in-chief is Tomislav Smoljanović (University of Zagreb School of Medicine). According to the Journal Citation Reports, the journal has a 2016 impact factor of 1.619.
