= Ana Kaštelan =

Croatian volleyball player (born 1980)

Personal information
- Nationality: Croatian
- Born: 22 April 1980 (age 46); Dubrovnik
- Height: 1.85 m (6 ft 1 in)
- Weight: 75 kg (165 lb)

National team
2000	Croatia

Ana Kaštelan (born 1980) is a Croatian former volleyball player. She was part of the Croatia women's national volleyball team.

Kaštelan competed with the national team at the 1999 Women's European Volleyball Championship, finishing second. She competed with the national team at the 2000 Summer Olympics in Sydney, Australia, finishing 7th.

Kaštelan retired from competitive volleyball in 2005.

== See also ==
- Croatia at the 2000 Summer Olympics
