= Island Challenge Cup =

Event at the Henley Royal Regatta

- Venue: Henley Royal Regatta, River Thames
- Location: Henley-on-Thames, Oxfordshire
- Dates: 2020 – present

Island Challenge Cup is a rowing event for women's student eights at the annual Henley Royal Regatta on the River Thames at Henley-on-Thames in England.

The event is open to members of a boat club of any university, college or secondary school. Combined entries may only be made by no more than two college boat clubs of any one university. It was inaugurated in 2020 but due to the COVID-19 pandemic was unable to hold its inaugural running.

== Past winners ==
Year	Winner	Runner-Up	Time	Ref
2020	No competition due to COVID-19 pandemic			
2021	Oxford Brookes	University of London	7.10	
2022	Brown University	Yale University BC, USA	6.57	
2023	Oxford Brookes	University of Pennsylvania BC, USA	7.18	
2024	Oxford Brookes	Newcastle University	7.23	
2025	Rutgers University	Newcastle University	6.45	
