= Peter van der Noort =

Dutch rower

Personal information
- Nationality: Dutch
- Born: 30 August 1974 (age 50); Amersfoort, Netherlands

Sport
- Sport: Rowing

Peter van der Noort (born 30 August 1974) is a Dutch rower. He competed in the men's eight event at the 2000 Summer Olympics.
