= Bryan Donnelly (rower) =

Canadian rower

Personal information
- Nationality: Canadian
- Born: 8 April 1975 (age 50); Dublin, Ireland

Sport
- Sport: Rowing

Bryan Donnelly (born 8 April 1975) is a Canadian rower. He competed in the men's eight event at the 2000 Summer Olympics.
