= Morgan Crooks =

Canadian rower

Personal information
- Born: 30 June 1976 (age 49) Lethbridge, Alberta, Canada

Sport
- Sport: Rowing
- College team: Princeton University

Morgan Crooks (born 30 June 1976) is a Canadian rower. He competed in the men's eight event at the 2000 Summer Olympics.
