= Garrett Miller (rower) =

American rower

Medal record

Men's rowing

Representing United States

World Rowing Championships
Gold medal – first place	1997 Aiguebelette	M8+
Gold medal – first place	1998 Cologne	M8+
Gold medal – first place	1999 St. Catharines	M8+

Garrett Miller (born June 7, 1977 in Philadelphia, Pennsylvania) is an American rower. He finished 5th in the Men's eight at the 2000 Summer Olympics.
