= Igor Boraska =

Croatian rower (born 1970)

Igor Boraska OLY
Personal information
- Born: 26 September 1970 (age 55) Split, SR Croatia, Yugoslavia
- Education: Brown University
Medal record
Men's rowing
Representing Croatia
Olympic Games
Bronze medal – third place	2000 Sydney	Eight

Igor Boraska (born 26 September 1970) is a Croatian rower who won a bronze medal in the eights competition at the 2000 Summer Olympics in Sydney.

== Early life ==
Boraska was born in Split, SR Croatia, Yugoslavia.

He attended Brown University, where he crewed for the school's team. Boraska graduated in 1994 with a degree in mechanical engineering and economics.

== Rowing career ==
Boraska's teammates at Sydney were Branimir Vujević, Nikša Skelin, Siniša Skelin, Krešimir Čuljak, Tomislav Smoljanović, Tihomir Franković, Igor Francetić and Silvijo Petriško (coxswain). Boraska also participated at the 1996 Summer Olympics and at the 2004 Summer Olympics, both time in coxless four discipline. He was a World champion and a medalist at the World Rowing Championships.

He was a world record (world's best time) holder, for 20 years, in a coxed pair event set at 1994 World rowing championship.

Boraska retired from competitive rowing in 2010.

== Bobsleigh career ==
Boraska was a member of a Croatian team at the 2002 Winter Olympics, as a part of a four-men bobsleigh team. He is the first Croat who participated in both the Summer and the Winter Olympic Games.
