= Miles Hunt-Davis =

British Army officer (1938–2018)

Sir Miles Hunt-Davis
- Born: 7 November 1938; Johannesburg, South Africa
- Died: 23 May 2018 (aged 79)
- Spouse: Anita Hunt-Davis
- Relatives: 3 children including Ben Hunt-Davis (rower)
- Military career
- Allegiance: United Kingdom
- Branch: British Army
- Service years: 1960–1961; 1962–1991
- Rank: Brigadier
- Service number: 466744
- Commands: Brigade of Gurkhas; 7th Duke of Edinburgh's Own Gurkha Rifles
- Conflicts: Indonesia–Malaysia confrontation
- Awards: Knight Grand Cross of the Royal Victorian Order; Commander of the Order of the British Empire
- Other work: Private Secretary to the Duke of Edinburgh (1993–2010)

Brigadier Sir Miles Garth Hunt-Davis, GCVO, CBE (7 November 1938 – 23 May 2018) was a British Army officer who was also the Private Secretary to The Duke of Edinburgh from 1993 until 2010.

== Early life and education ==
Miles Hunt-Davis was born in Johannesburg, Union of South Africa, in 1938 and educated at St Andrew's College.

== Military career ==
After attending the Mons Officer Cadet School, Hunt-Davis was commissioned a probationary second lieutenant in the Queen's Brigade of the Territorial Army on 5 August 1960, and relinquished his commission on 16 November 1961. He joined the 6th Queen Elizabeth's Own Gurkha Rifles as a second lieutenant (direct-entry) holding a short-service commission on 14 April 1962. On 16 October 1963, he was granted a regular commission in the same regiment with the rank of second lieutenant (seniority 14 April 1962).

He served in Borneo and Malaysia 1964–1966, and was promoted to lieutenant on 14 April 1965. Promoted captain on 14 April 1968, from 1969 to 1970 he attended the Canadian Land Forces Command and Staff College, and was promoted to major on 31 December 1971. From 1974 to 1976 he was brigade major of the 48th Gurkha Infantry Brigade. Promoted lieutenant colonel on 30 June 1976, he commanded 7th Duke of Edinburgh's Own Gurkha Rifles from 25 September. He was appointed a Member of the Order of the British Empire in 1977. In 1979–1980 he was the Chief Instructor, Tactics Wing, of the School of Infantry, and 1980–1982 General Staff Officer Grade 1 (GSO1) Tactics at the School. From 1982 to 1983 he was instructor at the Staff College, Camberley (psc), and was promoted to colonel on 30 June 1984. In 1985–1987 he was Commander British Gurkhas, Nepal. Promoted to brigadier on 31 December 1987 (seniority 30 June), from 1987 to 1990, based in Hong Kong, he commanded the Brigade of Gurkhas. Advanced to Commander of the Order of the British Empire in 1990, he retired on 1 August 1991.

== Personal life ==
Hunt-Davies was married to Anita (née Ridsdale) and together they had three children: Joanna Mary, Justin, and Francis Benedict (Ben) who won a gold medal in the men's eight at the 2000 Sydney Olympic games. He has nine grandchildren. During his time as Private Secretary to Prince Philip, Hunt-Davis lived in a house in the grounds of Kensington Palace and then a flat in Kensington Palace. After his retirement they lived in Wiltshire.

== Private Secretary ==
After leaving the British Army Hunt-Davis was Colonel of the 7th Duke of Edinburgh's Gurkha Rifles (1991-1994), and Chairman of the Gurkha Brigade Association (1991–2003). Hunt-Davis joined the Household of the Duke of Edinburgh as Assistant Private Secretary in 1991. He was promoted to Private Secretary in 1993, and appointed a Commander of the Royal Victorian Order in 1998. He was knighted as a Knight Commander of the Royal Victorian Order in 2003 and, on his retirement in 2010, was advanced to Knight Grand Cross of the Royal Victorian Order.
