= Merijn van Oijen =

Dutch rower

Personal information
- Nationality: Dutch
- Born: 10 December 1973 (age 51); Turnhout, Belgium

Sport
- Sport: Rowing

Merijn van Oijen (born 10 December 1973) is a Dutch rower. He competed in the men's eight event at the 2000 Summer Olympics.
