= Mario Palmisano =

Italian rower (born 1978)

Personal information
- Nationality: Italian
- Born: 28 May 1978 (age 47); Naples, Italy

Sport
- Sport: Rowing

Mario Palmisano (born 28 May 1978) is an Italian rower. He competed in the men's eight event at the 2000 Summer Olympics.
