= Voinești, Dâmbovița =

Voinești
- Commune
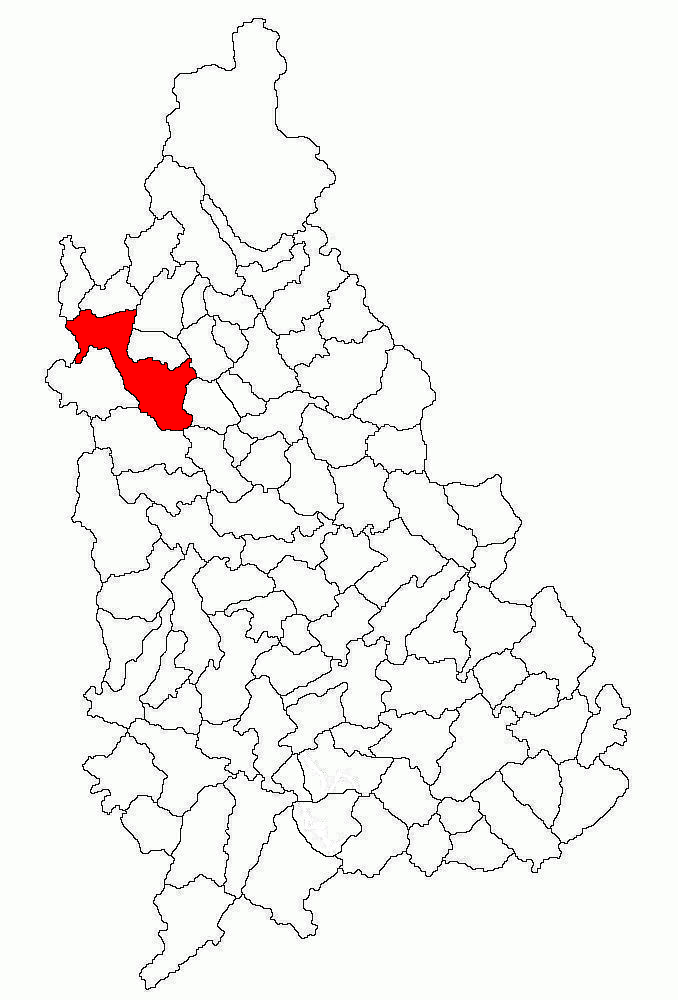
- Location in Dâmbovița County

- Location in Romania
- Coordinates: 45°4′N 25°15′E
- Country: Romania
- County: Dâmbovița

Government
  - Mayor (2020–2024): Gabriel Dănuț Sandu (Ind.)
- Area: 81.03 km^{2} (31.29 sq mi)
- Elevation: 402 m (1,319 ft)
- Population (2021-12-01): 5,911
  - Density: 73/km^{2} (190/sq mi)
- Time zone: EET/EEST (UTC+2/+3)
- Postal code: 137525
- Area code: +(40) 245
- Vehicle reg.: DB
- Website: primarievoinesti.ro

Voinești is a commune in Dâmbovița County, Muntenia, Romania with a population of 5,911 as of 2021. It is composed of eight villages: Gemenea-Brătulești, Izvoarele, Lunca, Manga, Mânjina, Oncești, Suduleni, and Voinești.

At Voinești, there is a powerful mediumwave broadcasting station with 2 masts, working on 630 kHz.

Historical population
Year	Pop.	±%
2002	6,246	—
2011	6,203	−0.7%
2021	5,911	−4.7%
Source: Census data

== Natives ==
- Cătălin Grigore (born 1977), footballer
- Gheorghe Pîrvan (born 1976), rower
