= Chris Taylor (rowing) =

Canadian rower

Personal information
- Born: 25 August 1966 (age 58); St. Catharines, Ontario, Canada

Sport
- Sport: Rowing

Chris Taylor (born 25 August 1966) is a Canadian rower. He competed in the men's eight event at the 2000 Summer Olympics.
