= Ingrid Šišković =

Croatian volleyball player

Ingrid Siscovich

Personal information
- Full name: Ingrid Siscovich
- Nickname: Sisco
- Nationality: Croatian; Italian
- Born: 6 June 1980 (age 46); Pula, SR Croatia, SFR Yugoslavia
- Hometown: Pula, Croatia
- Height: 1.83 m (6 ft 0 in)
- Weight: 71 kg (157 lb)
- Spike: 320
- Block: 300

Volleyball information
- Position: Opposite, attacker
- Number: 2

Career
Years	Teams
1993–2000; 2000–2001; 2001–2004; 2004–2005; 2005–2006; 2006–2007; 2007–2008; 2008–2009	ŽOK Istarska Banka; Tortoreto; Reggio Emilia; Arzano; Matera; Muszynianka Fakro; Yamamay Busto Arsizio; Benevento

National team
2000	Croatia
Honours
Women's volleyball
Representing Croatia
European U-18 Championship
Silver medal – second place	1997 Slovakia	U-18 Team
European Championship
Silver medal – second place	1999 Italy	Team

Ingrid Siscovich (born 6 June 1980) is a former Croatian female volleyball player. She was part of the Croatia women's national volleyball team. Siscovich was named MVP at 1997 Girls' Youth European Volleyball Championship in Slovakia. She won a silver at 1999 Women's European Volleyball Championship in Italy.

== Career ==
=== Clubs ===
Siscovich was born on June 6, 1980, in Pula, Croatia. She started playing volleyball at 9, with local club OK Istarska Banka. Her talent was noted quickly, and at 13 she was already playing games with the first team. With the Istarska banka's kadeti (juniors), she won the Croatian junior championship for five years in a row (1994, 1995, 1996, 1997, 1998), being named MVP of the championship each year.

As she played with the kadeti and then the U-20 team, Siscovich also occasionally played for the first team. The season 1999/2000, in which Istarska Banka finished third in the championship, was her last season in Croatia. She then moved to Italy, and in her first season there (2000/2001) she played for Tortoreto in the A2 league. She then played four years in the Italian first league with Cerdisa Reggio Emilia. She then moved to Arzano, playing there the 2004/2005 season in the A2 league, finishing second in the league and gaining promotion to the first Italian League for Arzano. She then moved to BBC Toyota Matera in the Italian A2 League.

After Matera she moved to Poland, to Muszynianka Fakro, in the TAURON Liga, playing there the 2006/2007 season. The next season (2007/2008) she moved back to Italy, to Yamamay Busto Arsizio, playing in the Italian A league. With Yamamay she reached the quarter finals in the playoffs, where the team was knocked out by Sirio Perugia, which would go on to reach the final. She then moved to Accademia Benevento, playing there in the 2008/2009 season.

She moved back to Croatia for the 2009/2010 season, to Poreč, in the Croatian Beach volleyball first league, winning the Croatian Cup and finishing 2nd in the Croatian Championship that year. She then interrupted her career due to pregnancy. She came back in the 2013/2014 season, playing in the Italian Serie C. Her team finished first in the league and was promoted to the Italian B League.

=== National team ===
She debuted with the Croatian national team in 1995, at the junior European Championship in Ankara. In 1997 she was declared best player at the Junior European Championship in Slovakia, where Croatia won the silver. In 1998 she played at the junior European Championship in Belgium as well as the senior World Championship in Japan. With the senior national team she played at the 1999 World Cup in Sweden. In the same year, Siscovich played in Brema in the tournament of qualification to the Olympic games, finishing third with Croatia. Siscovich won the silver medal at the European Championship in Rome in 1999. She also represented Croatia at the 1999 Military Games in Zagreb, winning the gold medal.

At the beginning of 2000, Siscovich took part in the qualification games for Sydney 2000, helping Croatia to qualify for the Summer Olympics. She finished 7th with Croatia in the 2000 women's Olympic volleyball tournament. Siscovich also played for Croatia at the 2001 European Championship in Bulgaria.

After her retirement, Siscovich became a coach. She was the coach of the young cadets, cadets and juniors of Italian Serie C club Livorno from 2009 to 2013. She was also the club's team manager. In the 2014/2014 season she coached the cadets of Volley Massafra. In the 2014(2015 season she was the coach of the young cadets of Comes Tempesta Taranto.

== Sporting achievements ==
=== Clubs ===
==== National championships ====
- 1999/2000 Croatian Championship, with Istarska banka
- 2006 Polish Super Cup, with Muszynianka Fakro
- 2007/2008 3rd/4th place Italian Cup, with Busto Arsizio
- 2007/2008 Serie A1 Playoffs quarterfinals, with Busto Arsizio

=== National team ===
- 1997 U-18 European Championship
- 1999 CEV European Championship
- 1999 Military World Games

== Individually ==
- 1994 Croatian junior championship – Most Valuable Player
- 1995 Croatian junior championship – Most Valuable Player
- 1996 Croatian junior championship – Most Valuable Player
- 1997 Croatian junior championship – Most Valuable Player
- 1997 1997 Girls' Youth European Volleyball Championship – Most Valuable Player
- 1998 Croatian junior championship – Most Valuable Player

== See also ==
- Croatia at the 2000 Summer Olympics
