= Matt Swick =

Canadian rower

Personal information
- Born: 1 September 1978 (age 46); St. Catharines, Ontario, Canada

Sport
- Sport: Rowing

Matt Swick (born 1 September 1978) is a Canadian former rower. He competed in the men's eight event at the 2000 Summer Olympics.

== Education and career ==
Swick graduated from Brock University in 2004, with a major in biology and physical education. In 2007, Swick was hired by his alma mater, Holy Cross Catholic Secondary School, to teach science and geography. As of 2025, he still teaches at the school.
