= Florian Tudor =

Romanian rower

Personal information
- Born: 23 May 1973 (age 53) Brăila, Romania
Medal record
Men's rowing
Representing Romania
World Championships
Gold medal – first place	1994 Indianapolis	M4+
Silver medal – second place	1997 Aiguebelette	M8+
Bronze medal – third place	1994 Indianapolis	M8+
Bronze medal – third place	1997 Aiguebelette	M4-
Bronze medal – third place	1998 Cologne	M8+

Florian Tudor (born 23 May 1973 in Brăila) is a Romanian rower. He competed in the Men's eight at the 2000 Summer Olympics.
