= Costel Mutescu =

Romanian rower

Personal information
- Nationality: Romanian
- Born: 7 May 1974 (age 50); Rădăuți, Romania

Sport
- Sport: Rowing

Costel Mutescu (born 7 May 1974) is a Romanian rower. He competed in the men's eight event at the 2000 Summer Olympics.
