= Gioacchino Cascone =

Italian rower

Personal information
- Nationality: Italian
- Born: 6 March 1972 (age 53); Castellammare di Stabia, Italy

Sport
- Sport: Rowing

Gioacchino Cascone (born 6 March 1972) is an Italian rower. He competed in the men's eight event at the 2000 Summer Olympics.
