= Franco Berra =

Italian rower

Personal information
- Nationality: Italian
- Born: 7 May 1972 (age 52); Magenta, Italy

Sport
- Sport: Rowing

Franco Berra (born 7 May 1972) is an Italian rower. He competed in the men's eight event at the 2000 Summer Olympics.
