= Luca Ghezzi =

Italian rower

Personal information
- Nationality: Italian
- Born: 5 September 1978 (age 46); Milan, Italy

Sport
- Sport: Rowing

Luca Ghezzi (born 5 September 1978) is an Italian rower. He competed at the 2000 Summer Olympics and the 2004 Summer Olympics.
