= Valerio Pinton =

Italian rower

Personal information
- Nationality: Italian
- Born: 14 February 1978 (age 47); Padua, Italy

Sport
- Sport: Rowing

Valerio Pinton (born 14 February 1978) is an Italian rower. He competed at the 2000 Summer Olympics and the 2004 Summer Olympics.
