= Marija Anzulović =

Croatian volleyball player (born 1968)

Personal information
- Nationality: Croatian
- Born: 31 October 1968 (age 57)
- Height: 1.78 m (5 ft 10 in)
- Weight: 65 kg (143 lb)

National team
2000	Croatia

Marija Anzulović (born 31 October 1968) is a Croatian former volleyball player. She was part of the Croatia women's national volleyball team.

She competed with the national team at the 2000 Summer Olympics in Sydney, Australia, finishing 7th.

== See also ==
- Croatia at the 2000 Summer Olympics
