= Tihomir Franković =

Croatian rower (born 1970)

Medal record

Men's rowing

Representing Croatia

Olympic Games
Bronze medal – third place	2000 Sydney	Eight

Tihomir Franković (born 30 September 1970) is a Croatian rower who won a bronze medal in the eights competition at the 2000 Summer Olympics in Sydney. His teammates were Igor Boraska, Nikša Skelin, Siniša Skelin, Branimir Vujević, Krešimir Čuljak, Tomislav Smoljanović and Igor Francetić.

He was a world record (world's best time) holder, for 20 years, in a coxed pair event set at 1994 World rowing championship.
