= Patricia Daničić =

Croatian volleyball player (born 1978)

Personal information
- Nationality: Croatian
- Born: 21 April 1978 (age 48)
- Height: 1.83 m (6 ft 0 in)
- Weight: 80 kg (176 lb)

National team
2000	Croatia

Patricia Daničić (born 21 April 1978) is a retired Croatian female volleyball player. She was part of the Croatia women's national volleyball team.

She competed with the national team at the 2000 Summer Olympics in Sydney, Australia, finishing 7th.

== See also ==
- Croatia at the 2000 Summer Olympics
