= Aleksandr Litvinchev =

Russian rower

Personal information
- Nationality: Russian
- Born: 21 March 1972 (age 52); Moscow, Russia

Sport
- Sport: Rowing

Aleksandr Litvinchev (born 21 March 1972) is a Russian rower. He competed at the 2000 Summer Olympics and the 2004 Summer Olympics.
