= Tomislav Smoljanović =

Croatian rower and physician (born 1977)

Personal information
- Born: 15 July 1977 (age 49) Split, Croatia
- Education: School of Medicine, University of Zagreb
- Height: 1.90 m (6 ft 3 in)
- Weight: 90 kg (198 lb)

Sport
- Country: Croatia
- Sport: Men's rowing
- Event: Eights
- Club: HVK Gusar; HAVK Mladost
- Retired: 2003
Medal record
Men's rowing
Representing Croatia
Olympic Games
Bronze medal – third place	2000 Sydney	Eights
World Championships
Silver medal – second place	2001 Lucerne	Eights
World Junior Championships
Silver medal – second place	1995 Poznań	Coxed Pair

Tomislav Smoljanović (born 15 July 1977) is a Croatian medical scientist, physician, and a retired rower.

Smoljanović won bronze at the 2000 Summer Olympics and silver at the 2001 World Championships as a member of the national eights team. As a physician, he gained public prominence in 2011 for his research and campaigning which were instrumental in uncovering the harmful side effects of bone morphogenetic protein 2 therapy.

== Sports career ==
Smoljanović was born in Split in 1977. He took up rowing in 1989, but had to leave it due to bad grades in school, and returned to the sport only in 1993. Since 1994, as a member of HVK Gusar rowing club, he competed in the coxed pairs with Damir Vučičić, winning world junior silver medal in 1995. In 1998 Smoljanović won silver in the coxed fours in the World University Rowing Championships, teamed with Vučičić, Nikša Skelin and Oliver Martinov. Smoljanović moved from HVK Gusar to Zagreb-based HAVK Mladost rowing club in 1999, after enrolling in the School of Medicine, University of Zagreb.

Smoljanović won a bronze medal in the eights competition at the 2000 Summer Olympics in Sydney. His teammates were Igor Boraska, Nikša Skelin, Siniša Skelin, Branimir Vujević, Krešimir Čuljak, Tihomir Franković and Igor Francetić, with Silvijo Petriško as coxswain. In the 2001 World Rowing Championships in Lucerne, Smoljanović was a member of a slightly changed national eights team – with Oliver Martinov and Damir Vučičić instead of Franković and Francetić – which won a silver medal.

Smoljanović retired from competitive rowing in 2003.

== Scientific career ==
After earning his M.D. degree in 2002, Smoljanović worked as a physician at the Department of Orthopaedics of the University Hospital Centre in Zagreb. In 2006, while examining the available literature on bone morphogenetic protein 2 (BMP-2), used to stimulate bone growth in spinal fusion procedures, Smoljanović and his colleagues discovered that BMP-2 therapy had major side effects that were being ignored by most studies. The most serious complication was retrograde ejaculation, which caused temporary or even permanent sterility in men. Smoljanović started to write letters to editors of medical journals, pointing to deficiencies in papers on the BMP-2 therapy, but both the letters and Smoljanović's review article on the topic were rejected for publication. Nevertheless, he remained unconvinced, feeling that his concerns were not met with valid counterarguments. After finding out that most editorial boards of rejecting journals had at least one member with financial ties to Medtronic, a major producer of BMP-2-based products, Smoljanović and his colleagues took the "guerrilla science approach", writing more than 35 letters to medical journals.

Smoljanović's complaints eventually caught the attention of Stanford researchers, whose 2011 study ultimately found that the incidence of harmful side effects was 10 to 50 times higher than previously reported, and criticized the earlier industry-sponsored studies for "biased and corrupted research". In 2011, the US Senate and Department of Justice started investigations of Medtronic over the omissions of safety problems from clinical trials data.

Smoljanović currently works as an assistant professor at the School of Medicine, University of Zagreb and is a member of FISA Sports Medicine Commission. In 2013, the Croatian Ministry of Science, Education and Sport named him among top twenty junior researchers in the country.

As of 2018, Smoljanović is the editor-in-chief of Croatian Medical Journal.
