= Gheorghe Pîrvan =

Romanian rower (born 1976)

Medal record

Men's rowing

Representing Romania

World Rowing Championships
| Gold medal – first place | 2001 Lucerne | M8+ |
| Bronze medal – third place | 1998 Cologne | M8+ |

Gheorghe Pîrvan (born 29 January 1976 in Voinești, Dâmbovița) is a Romanian rower.
