= Krešimir Čuljak =

Croatian rower (born 1970)

Medal record

Men's rowing

Representing Croatia

Olympic Games
Bronze medal – third place	2000 Sydney	Eight

Mediterranean Games
Gold medal – first place	1997 Bari	Fours

Krešimir Čuljak (born 18 September 1970 in Zagreb) is a Croatian rower who won a bronze medal in the eights competition at the 2000 Summer Olympics in Sydney, along with Igor Boraska, Nikša Skelin, Siniša Skelin, Branimir Vujević, Tomislav Smoljanović, Tihomir Franković and Igor Francetić.
