= Dmitry Kovalyov (rower) =

Russian rower

Dmitry Aleksandrovich Kovalyov (Russian: Дмитрий Александрович Ковалёв; born 27 March 1976 in Kaluga, RSFSR) is a former Russian rower. He competed at the 1999 World Rowing Championships and 2000 Summer Olympics. He won the bronze medal for rowing.
