= Daniel Burke (rower) =

Australian rower (born 1974)

Medal record

Men's rowing

Representing Australia

Olympic Games
Silver medal – second place	2000 Sydney	Eight

World Rowing Championships
Bronze medal – third place	1997 Aiguebelette	M8+

World Rowing U23 Championships
Silver medal – second place	1996 Haezewinkel	M2-

Daniel Burke (born 2 May 1974 in Sydney) is an Australian rower who won a silver medal at the 2000 Sydney Olympics. He's one of only two Australian oarsmen to have twice won the Grand Challenge Cup at the Henley Royal Regatta.

== Club and state rowing ==
Burke was raised in Shoal Bay on the central coast of New South Wales. He was educated at St. Joseph's College, Hunters Hill where he took up rowing. He rowed in that school's First VIII in both of his senior years 1991 and 1992. His senior club rowing was done from the Sydney Rowing Club and the Sydney University Boat Club.

Burke first made state selection for New South Wales in the 1996 senior men's eight to contest the King's Cup at the Interstate Regatta within the Australian Rowing Championships. He stroked that crew to a second place. He raced in four further King's Cup eights for New South Wales in 1997, 1998, 1999, and 2000. His King's Cup career was during a period of Victorian dominance.

== International representative rowing ==
Burke's Australian representative debut came in 1995 when he was selected to row a coxed pair with Shane McLaughlin at the 1995 World Rowing Championships in Tampere. With Teesan Koo in the bow, they placed fourth. At the 1996 World Rowing U23 Championships he competed in the Australian coxless pair and rowed to a silver medal with Alastair Gordon.

In 1997 he secured a seat in the Australian men's senior eight. He raced in the eight at two World Rowing Cups in Europe that year and then at the Henley Royal Regatta as an Australian Institute of Sport crew they contested and won the 1997 Grand Challenge Cup. At the 1997 World Rowing Championships in Aiguebelette, France he rowed in the six seat for their third placing in the final and to a bronze medal. He held his seat in the Australian eight in 1998 and raced at the 1998 World Rowing Championships in Cologne to a sixth-place finish. In the 2000 Olympic year Burke was back in contention for the Australian eight. He rowed in both World Rowing Cup races in Europe in their lead up campaign as well as at the Henley Royal Regatta where they raced as an Australian Institute of Sport eight and won that year's Grand Challenge Cup. At Sydney 2000 the Australian eight won their heat in a pace that blew away the eventual gold medallists Great Britain. However, in the final they started slowly and their late sprint home left them 0.8 seconds behind the Brits at the line and taking the silver Olympic medal in a thrilling finish.

Burke's record in winning two Grand Challenge Cups at the Henley Royal Regatta is a rare feat for British rowers, but never before achieved by an Australian oarsman.

== Yachting ==
After the 2000 Olympic Games Burke turned his hand to Yacht racing. In 2003 he competed in the Rolex IMS maxi world championships in Capri Italy. He was a crew member aboard 'Bumblebee 5' finishing 5th.

== Personal and family ==
He attended the University of Sydney where he obtained a Bachelor of Education and a Masters of Commerce in International Business and Marketing. In 2002 Burke received a Sydney University Blue for the sport of rowing. His brother Michael - a state and national amateur heavy weight boxing representative - also received a Blue in the same year for the sport of boxing.

His brother in-law Matthew Gray is a three time Olympic archer for Australia. His sister Kathleen is also an Australian rower.
