= Rob Jahrling =

Australian rower and Olympic medalist

Personal information
- Nationality: Australian
- Born: 14 February 1974 (age 52) East Berlin, East Germany
- Education: Newington College; Monash University
- Occupation: Investment banker
- Height: 200 cm (6 ft 7 in)
- Weight: 111 kg (245 lb)
- Relatives: Harald Jährling (father); Marina Wilke (mother)
Medal record
Men's rowing
Representing Australia
Olympic Games
Silver medal – second place	2000 Sydney	Eight
World Championships
Silver medal – second place	2002 Seville	Coxed pair
Commonwealth Rowing Championships
Silver medal – second place	1994 Ontario	M4-

Robert Jahrling (born 14 February 1974) is an East Berlin-born Olympian rower of East German parentage who competed for Australia at three Olympic Games. He is an Australian state and national champion, a medallist at World Rowing Championships, Rowing World Cups, Commonwealth Games and won a silver medal at the 2000 Sydney Olympics in the men's eight.

== Personal ==
Jahrling was born in East Berlin, Germany. His parents, Marina Wilke and Harald Jährling, are both Olympic gold medallists in rowing for East Germany. His mother – the coxswain of the East German women's eight – was not yet sixteen when Jahrling was born. Jahrling attended Dynamo Berlin Sports School in East Berlin and Newington College (1991–1992) where he was coached by Robert Buntine and Michael Morgan. He holds a BA (Commerce) with majors in International Finance, Accounting, Marketing and Management from Monash University where he graduated in 2000.

According to Jahrling's LinkedIn profile he completed further education at MIT Massachusetts Institute of Technology, Columbia Business School, Stanford University, Yale School of Management, University of Oxford, Harvard Business School, Cambridge University and Wharton School University of Pennsylvania.

Jahrling works as an investment banker at Citi where he is a Managing Director and the Head of Equity Capital Markets for Australia.

== Club and state rowing ==
Jahrling's senior club rowing was done from Sydney Rowing Club, where he is an Honorary Life Member. He was first selected to represent New South Wales in the 1993 men's senior eight contesting the King's Cup at the Interstate Regatta within the Australian Rowing Championships. He raced in further King's Cup eights for New South Wales in 1994, 1995, 1998, 2000, 2002 and 2004. His King's Cup career was during a period of Victorian dominance and Jahrling only saw one NSW victory – in 2004.

In Sydney Rowing Club colours Jahrling contested numerous national titles at the Australian Rowing Championships. He won 7 national championships and 21 New South Wales state championship titles.

Jahrling represented Australia at 3 Olympic Games (1x Silver), 8 World Championships, 3 Commonwealth Games (1 Gold, 1 Silver, 1 Bronze) and over 50 World Cup regattas:

- 6th Place 1996 Atlanta Olympics M8+
- 2nd Place 2000 Sydney Olympics M8+
- 3rd Place 2002 World Championships Seville M2-
- 4th Place 2004 Athens Olympics M4-
- 7x Australian Champion
- 21x NSW State Champion
- 1x Kings Cup Gold
- 7x Kings Cup Silver

== Accolades ==
Jahrling is a five time New South Wales Rower of the Year recipient and has been involved in fund raising activities for Step to the Future and Mission Australia. He is an Honorary Life Member of Sydney Rowing Club.

== Post-rowing career ==
From 2000, Jahrling worked as an investment banker for Credit Suisse in Australia and Deutsche Bank in Hong Kong. Later he became a managing director at Citi in Australia and the head of Equity Syndicate.
