= Christian Ryan =

Australian rower

Personal information
- Born: 5 June 1977 (age 49)

Sport
- Sport: Rowing
- Club: Melbourne University Boat Club.
Medal record
Men's rowing
Representing Australia
Olympic Games
Silver medal – second place	2000 Sydney	Eight
World Rowing U23 Championships
Gold medal – first place	1998 Ionnina	BM8+

Christian Ryan (born 5 June 1977 in Warrnambool, Victoria) is an Australian former rower who won a silver medal at the 2000 Sydney Olympics.

== Club and state rowing ==
Ryan's senior club rowing was from the Melbourne University Boat Club.

Victorian state representation first came for Ryan in the 1996 youth eight which contested and won the Noel Wilkinson Trophy at the Interstate Regatta within the Australian Rowing Championships. In 1998 he was selected in the Victorian men's eight to race for the King's Cup at the Interstate Regatta. He rowed in the bow seat of that 1998 Vic eight to a King's Cup victory. He rowed in further Victorian King's Cup crews in 1999, 2000, 2005, 2006, 2007 and saw victories in 2000, 2006 and 2007.

== International representative rowing ==
Ryan's Australian representative debut was at the 1997 World Rowing Cup III in Lucerne in an U23 Australian eight. That crew then competed at the 1997 World Rowing U23 Championships in Milan where they raced to a fourth place. In 1998 he was again in the Australian U23 eight when they raced at the World Rowing Cup III in Lucerne and then at the 1998 World Rowing U23 Championships in Ioannina, Greece where they won the gold medal.

In 1999 Ryan was elevated to the Australian senior squad. He competed in a coxless pair at the World Rowing Cup III in Lucerne and then was selected in the Australian eight for the 1999 World Rowing Championships in St Catharine's Canada. The eight missed the A final and finished in overall seventh place.

In 2000 Ryan was in the Australian eight which qualified for the Olympics and raced at two Rowing World Cups in the lead up campaign as well as at the Henley Royal Regatta where they raced as an Australian Institute of Sport eight and won that year's Grand Challenge Cup. At Sydney 2000 with Ryan in the bow seat, the Australian eight won their heat in a pace that blew away the eventual gold medallists Great Britain. However, in the final they started slowly and their late sprint home left them 0.8 seconds behind the Brits at the line and to take the silver Olympic medal in a thrilling finish.

After a five year gap Ryan was back in national representative contention in 2005. He raced in a coxless pair with Karsten Forsterling at the 2005 World Rowing Championships to an overall eighth placing. In 2006 he made his last Australian appearance in a coxless four at the World Rowing Cup II in Poznan.
