= Branimir Vujević =

Croatian rower

Medal record

Men's rowing

Representing Croatia

Olympic Games
Bronze medal – third place	2000 Sydney	Eights

Mediterranean Games
Gold medal – first place	1997 Bari	Fours

Branimir Vujević (born 29 November 1974 in Zadar) is a Croatian rower who won a bronze medal in the eights competition at the 2000 Summer Olympics in Sydney. His teammates were Igor Boraska, Nikša Skelin, Siniša Skelin, Krešimir Čuljak, Tomislav Smoljanović, Tihomir Franković and Igor Francetić.
