= Louis Attrill =

English Olympic rower & rugby union footballer

Louis Attrill MBE
Personal information
- Born: Louis Mark Attrill; 5 March 1975 (age 51) Newport, Isle of Wight, England

Sport
- Sport: Rowing
- Club: Shanklin Sandown RC
Medal record
Men's rowing
Representing Great Britain
Olympic Games
| Gold medal – first place | 2000 Sydney | Eight |
World Championships
| Silver medal – second place | 1999 St. Catharines | Eight |

Louis Mark Attrill is a British rower and Olympic gold medallist.

== Career ==
Attrill took up rowing at Shanklin Rowing Club on the Isle of Wight and won novice at Milford regatta. The following year he furthered his interest in the sport at Imperial College Boat Club in 1993. Previously he had played rugby and cricket for Hampshire Colts and was British junior kick-boxing champion in 1991. In his first year of rowing, he won at Henley Royal Regatta in the Imperial College London Temple Challenge Cup eight. The following year he won his second Henley medal and made his international debut at under-23 level, he was also asked to travel to the 1995 senior World Championships in the reserve pair. In 1996, Attrill rowed for Imperial and won the premier event for eights at Henley Royal Regatta — the Grand Challenge Cup. He then went on to be selected for the British under-23 coxless four which won a gold medal at the Nations Cup.

Attrill was selected for the 1997 senior eight. This was a young crew, largely composed of ex-junior and under-23 internationals. They raced with freshness and flair throughout the World Cup series and finished in fourth place at the World Championships. He was in the eight again for the 1998 World Championships and they were unlucky to miss out on a place in the final.

Attrill won a silver medal in the eight at the 1999 World Championships in Canada. In a close race the British and Americans battled it out, pulling away from the rest of the field. The Brits took the lead in the third 500 metres only for the United States crew to snatch it back before the finish. It was Attril's third year in the eight and the result was a reflection of the meticulous attention to detail that the crew had put into their preparations. In 2000 they had a very successful season on the international circuit and took the World Cup title at Lucerne, Switzerland. He then went on to win an Olympic gold medal in the 2000 Sydney Games.

As of today, Louis Atrill has continued his carrer on the Isle of Wight. He is currently Employed at Ryde School with Upper Chine as a teacher and sports coach.

== Personal life ==
Attrill was born in Newport, Isle of Wight in 1975. He went to the Bay Church of England Secondary School, who have a suite named after him. He still lives on the Isle of Wight. He was appointed Member of the Order of the British Empire in the 2001 New Year Honours list.
