= Igor Francetić =

Croatian rower (born 1977)

Personal information
- Born: 21 April 1977 (age 49) Zagreb
- Height: 195 cm (6 ft 5 in)
- Weight: 90 kg (198 lb)
Medal record
Men's Rowing
Representing Croatia
Olympic Games
Bronze medal – third place	2000 Sydney	Eights

Igor Francetić (born 21 April 1977 in Zagreb) is a Croatian rower who won a bronze medal in the eights competition at the 2000 Summer Olympics in Sydney. His teammates were Igor Boraska, Nikša Skelin, Siniša Skelin, Branimir Vujević, Krešimir Čuljak, Tomislav Smoljanović and Tihomir Franković.
