= Alastair Gordon =

Australian rower

Personal information
- Born: 8 December 1976 (age 49)

Sport
- Sport: Rowing
- Club: Sydney Rowing Club
Medal record
Men's rowing
Representing Australia
Olympic Games
Silver medal – second place	2000 Sydney	Eight
World Rowing Championships
Bronze medal – third place	1997 Aiguebelette	M8+

Alastair Gordon (born 8 December 1976 in Sydney) is an Australian rower who won a silver medal at the 2000 Sydney Olympics. He's one of only two Australian oarsmen to have twice won the Grand Challenge Cup at the Henley Royal Regatta.

== Club and state rowing ==
Gordon was educated at The King's School in Sydney where he took up rowing. His senior club rowing was done from the Sydney Rowing Club.

Gordon first made state selection for New South Wales in the 1995 youth eight who won the Noel Wilkinson Trophy at the Interstate Regatta within the Australian Rowing Championships. In 1996 he made the New South Wales senior men's eight to contest the King's Cup at the Interstate Regatta within the Australian Rowing Championships. He raced in four further King's Cup eights for New South Wales in 1997, 1998, 1999, and 2000. His King's Cup career was during a period of Victorian dominance.

== International representative rowing ==
Gordon's Australian representative debut came in 1996 when he was selected to row a coxless pair with Daniel Burke at the World Rowing U23 Championships in Hazewinkel. They rowed to a silver . In 1997 he secured a seat in the Australian men's senior eight. He raced in the eight at two World Rowing Cups in Europe that year and then at the Henley Royal Regatta as an Australian Institute of Sport crew they contested and won the 1997 Grand Challenge Cup. At the 1997 World Rowing Championships in Aiguebelette, France he rowed in the six seat for their third placing in the final and to a bronze medal.

He held his seat in the Australian eight in 1998 and raced at the 1998 World Rowing Championships in Cologne to a sixth-place finish. Then in 1999 he was again the eight competing at the 1999 World Rowing Championships in St Catharine's Canada to a seventh-place finish.

In the 2000 Olympic year Gordon was secure in the Australian eight. He rowed in both World Rowing Cup races in Europe in their lead up campaign as well as at the Henley Royal Regatta where they raced as an Australian Institute of Sport eight and won that year's Grand Challenge Cup. At Sydney 2000 the Australian eight won their heat in a pace that blew away the eventual gold medallists Great Britain. However, in the final they started slowly and their late sprint home left them 0.8 seconds behind the Brits at the line and taking the silver Olympic medal in a thrilling finish.

Gordon's record in winning two Grand Challenge Cups at the Henley Royal Regatta is a rare feat for British rowers, but never before achieved by an Australian oarsman.
