= Steve Trapmore =

British rower

Steve Trapmore MBE
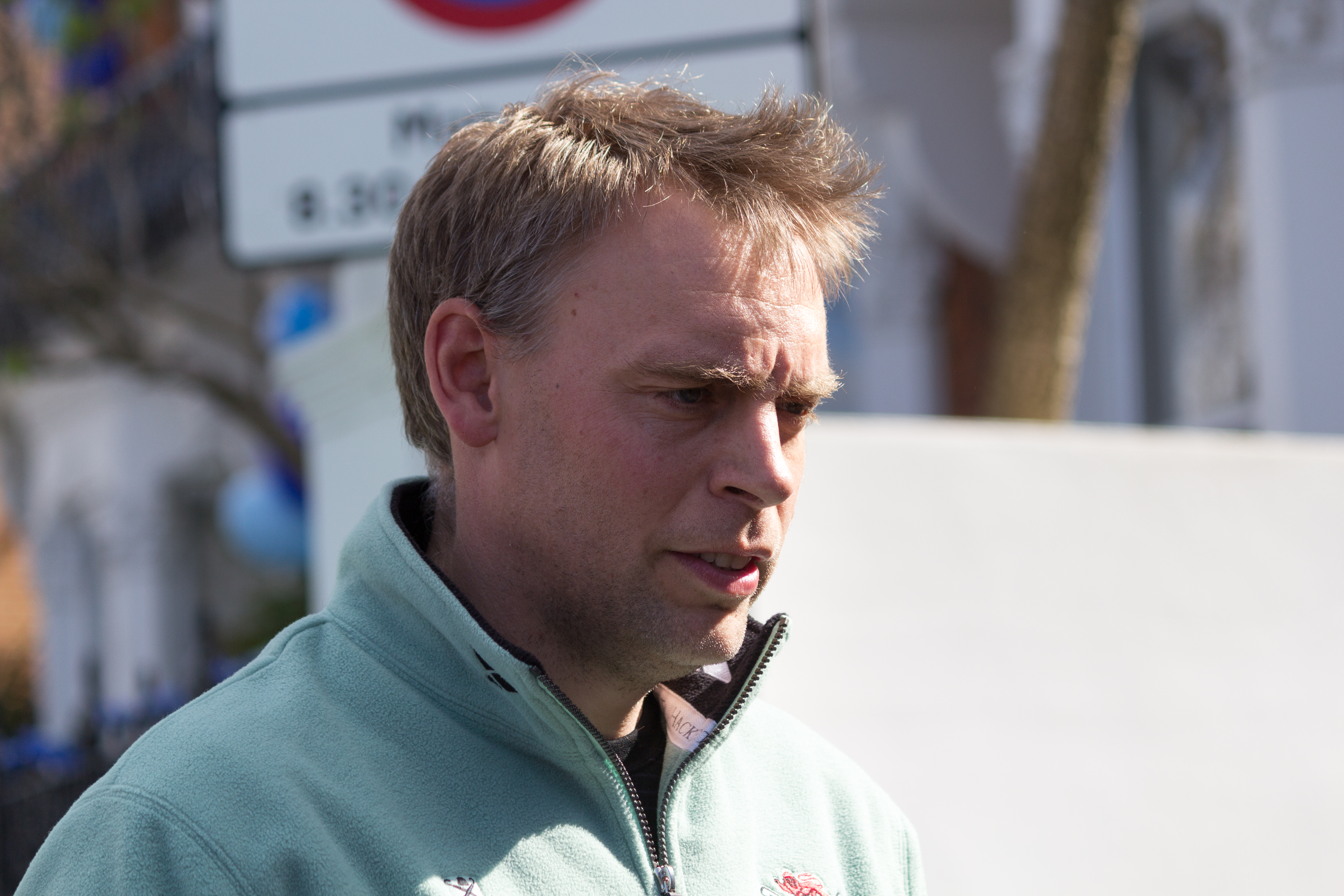
- Trapmore at The Boat Races 2015

Personal information
- Nationality: British
- Born: 18 March 1975 (age 51)

Sport
- Country: Great Britain
- Sport: Rowing
- Club: Nottinghamshire County Rowing Association
Medal record
Men's rowing
Representing Great Britain
Olympic Games
Gold medal – first place	2000 Sydney	Eight
World Championships
Gold medal – first place	2002 Seville	Coxed four
Silver medal – second place	1999 St. Catharines	Eight
Bronze medal – third place	1997 Aiguebelette	Coxed four

Stephen Patrick Trapmore MBE (born 18 March 1975) is an English rowing coach and former rower who represented Great Britain at the 2000 Summer Olympics in Sydney. He is currently the High Performance Coach within the Great Britain Olympic Rowing programme, developing athletes and crews to compete at World and Olympic competition.

== Education ==
Trapmore attended Halliford School, Shepperton, before going on to study Engineering at Nottingham Trent University. He was awarded an honorary degree from Trent in 2017 in recognition of his contribution to the sport of rowing.

== Rowing career ==
Trapmore started rowing at 15 at the Walton Rowing Club. By the age of 17 he was in the Great Britain Junior Team, competing in the Junior World Championships in 1993. As a senior athlete he trained with the Nottinghamshire County Rowing Association, winning his first senior medal in Aiguebelette in 1997. In 2000, he was part of the Great Britain eight that won at the Sydney Olympics, stroking the crew. He has also won a gold, silver and bronze medal at the World Championships as well as wins at Henley Royal Regatta and the Eights Head of the River race with Queen's Tower BC training out of the Imperial College Boat House.

== Coaching career ==
Following his retirement as an athlete in 2002, he began coaching Imperial College in 2007, and was appointed Head Coach there a year later. In 2010, Trapmore accepted the post as Chief Coach of Cambridge University Boat Club, leading them into the 2011 Boat Race campaign. In the years that followed Steve brought stability to the Cambridge programme developing a robust environment for scholar athletes of all backgrounds to excel in a ruthless but rewarding team environment. He coached the Light Blues to victory in 2012 and 2016. In December 2017, it was announced that Trapmore had accepted the role of High Performance Coach within the Great Britain Olympic Rowing programme and would be leaving Cambridge University Boat Club after the 2018 Boat Race. He went on to coach the GB Mens 8 to a Bronze medal at the Tokyo Olympics and Gold Medal at the Paris Olympics. The win in Paris makes him a member of a select group of people who have won Olympic Gold as an athlete and coach.

== Personal life ==
Trapmore is married to Nicola and has two daughters, Lucy and Anna.

== Honours ==
Steve was appointed Member of the Order of the British Empire (MBE) in 2001 for services to rowing.
