= Ben Hunt-Davis =

British rower

Ben Hunt-Davis MBE
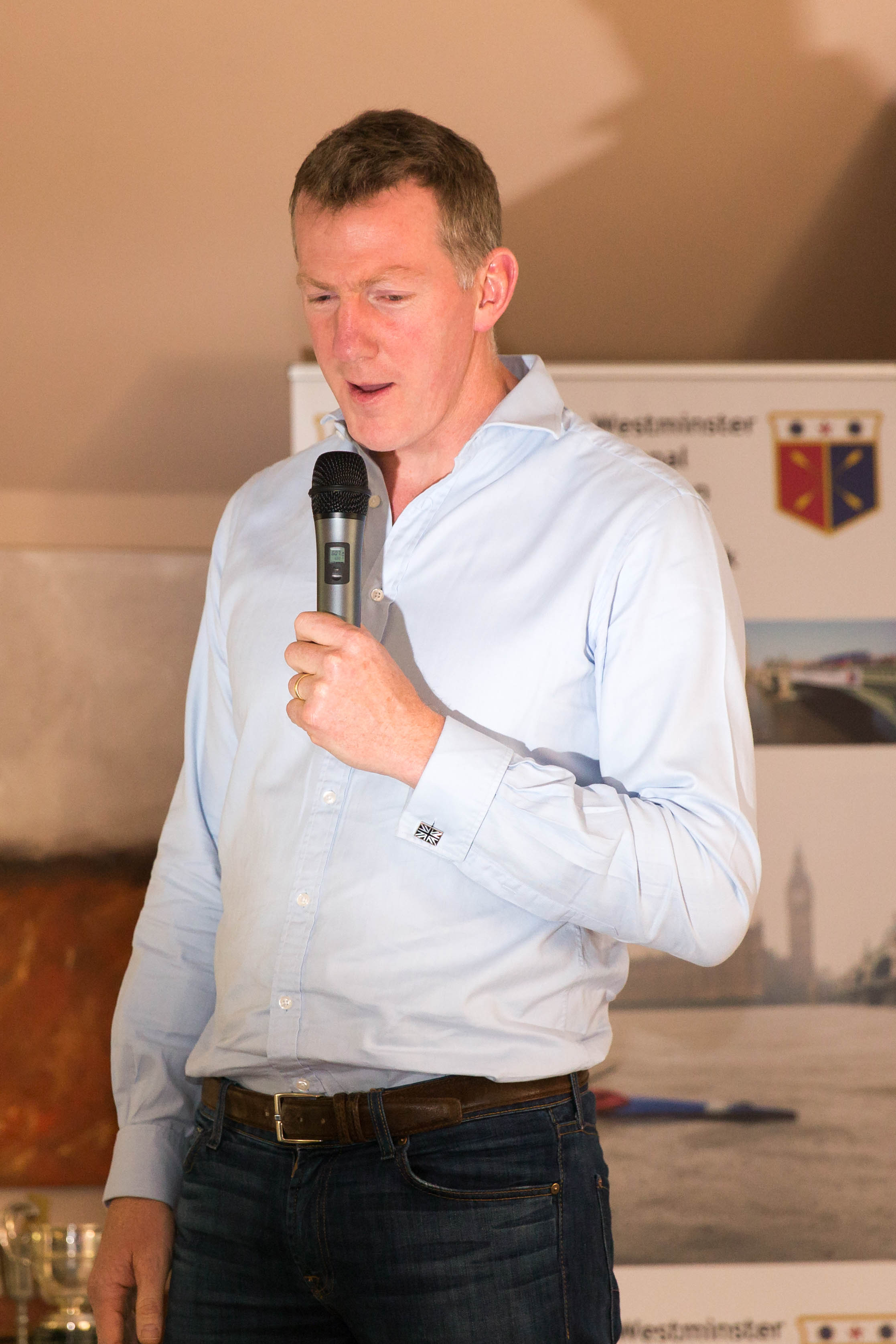

Personal information
- Nationality: British
- Born: 15 March 1972 (age 54) Tidworth, Wiltshire, South West England

Sport
- Sport: Rowing
Medal record
Representing Great Britain
Men's rowing
Olympic Games
Gold medal – first place	2000 Sydney	Eight
World Championships
Silver medal – second place	1999 St. Catharines	Eight

Francis Benedict Hunt-Davis MBE (born 15 March 1972) is a former British competition rower and an Olympic champion. He was appointed Member of the Order of the British Empire in the 2001 New Year Honours list.

== Early life ==
Hunt-Davis was educated at Shiplake College, Henley-on-Thames in Oxfordshire. He is the son of Anita and Miles Hunt-Davis, a British Army officer.

== Rowing career ==
Hunt-Davis competed at the 1992 Barcelona games and the 1996 Atlanta games, and won a silver medal in the 1999 World Rowing Championships. He won a gold medal in the Men's VIIIs at the 2000 Summer Olympics in Sydney, as a member of the British rowing team, the first British crew to have won this event since 1912.

== Life after rowing ==
Hunt-Davis is a keynote speaker and performance coach, and owns a leadership development company, Will It Make The Boat Go Faster? Ltd with Tom Barry. He has also worked for the British Olympic Association, and was the Chairman of the 2011 World Rowing Junior Championships and Chairman of the Organising Committee for the 2013 World Rowing Cup at Eton Dorney.

He co-authored Will It Make The Boat Go Faster? with Harriet Beveridge.

On 27 July 2012, Hunt-Davis was one of the crew of the Gloriana which rowed with the Olympic Torch from Hampton Court Palace to Westminster Bridge.

Hunt-Davis married Isabella (née Parish) in 2000; they have three children.
