= Luka Grubor =

British-Croatian rower

Luka Grubor MBE
Personal information
- Born: 27 December 1973 (age 52) Zagreb, Yugoslavia (now Croatia)
- Education: Somerville College, Oxford

Sport
- Club: Somerville College Boat Club
Medal record
Men's rowing
Representing Great Britain
Olympic Games
Gold medal – first place	2000 Sydney	Eight
World Championships
Gold medal – first place	2002 Seville	Coxed four
Silver medal – second place	1999 St. Catharines	Eight
Representing Croatia
Nations Cup
Gold medal – first place	1993 Ioannina	BM4-

Luka Grubor MBE (born 27 December 1973) is a retired rower, born in Zagreb, who competed internationally for Yugoslavia, Croatia and Great Britain, as well as for Oxford in the 1997 Boat Race. Grubor won a gold medal in the men's eight at the 2000 Summer Olympics in Sydney, as a member of the British rowing team.

Grubor studied at Somerville College, Oxford.

He was appointed Member of the Order of the British Empire in the 2001 New Year Honours list.
