= Fred Scarlett =

British rower

Medal record

Men's rowing

Representing Great Britain

Olympic Games
Gold medal – first place	2000 Sydney	Eight

World Championships
Silver medal – second place	1999 St. Catharines	Eight

Fred Scarlett MBE (born 29 April 1975 in Ashford) is an English Olympic gold medalist as a British rower.

He took up rowing at The King's School Canterbury, and was Captain of Boats in his final year. At Oxford Brookes University, he won two Henley Royal Regatta medals, in the Temple Challenge Cup, and the Visitors Challenge Cup. He had success at the junior and under-23 levels, and at the 1998 World University Championships, he won gold in the coxless pairs. Fred then became part of the British eight with coxswain, winning a silver medal at the 1999 World Rowing Championships, and then a gold medal in the 2000 Summer Olympics in Sydney. He retired shortly after. He was appointed Member of the Order of the British Empire in the 2001 New Year Honours list.

He now lives in Paris, working for Krug Champagne.
