= Rowley Douglas =

British rower (born 1977)

Medal record

Men's rowing

Representing Great Britain

Olympic Games
Gold medal – first place	2000 Sydney	Eight

World Championships
Silver medal – second place	1999 St. Catharines	Eight

Rowley Douglas MBE (born 27 January 1977 in Washington, D.C., United States) is a coxswain and rowing Olympic champion for Great Britain.

Douglas won a gold medal in the eight at the 2000 Summer Olympics in Sydney as a member of the British rowing team. In the Olympic final the British crew took an early lead and were only challenged towards the very end of the race.

Douglas coxed a variety of national team boats before taking the senior position with the national men's eight at the start of 1999. In the same year the crew won a silver medal at the World Rowing Championships. When in 2000 they won two rounds of the World Rowing Cup the eight began to be ranked amongst the favourites for the Olympics.

Douglas's last major championship appearance was in 2001.

He came out of retirement in 2010 in anticipation of the 2012 Summer Olympics in London, but a proposed trial at the Team GB training camp in Varese, Italy was scrapped by British Rowing. Douglas appealed the decision but his claim was rejected.

Douglas was appointed an MBE (Order of the British Empire) in the 2001 New Year Honours List.

He has held a number of senior roles across the financial services industry, including working for the financial services arm of General Electric. As of 2017, he works as vice president for North America for CloudSense, a US technology company.

== Education ==
Douglas was educated at Monkton Combe School, an independent school in Somerset, UK, and at Oxford Brookes University, where he read Technology Management.
