= Siniša Skelin =

Croatian rower

Medal record

Men's rowing

Representing Croatia

Olympic Games
| Silver medal – second place | 2004 Athens | Coxless pair |
| Bronze medal – third place | 2000 Sydney | Eight |

World Championships
| Silver medal – second place | 1998 Cologne | Coxed four |
| Silver medal – second place | 2001 Luzern | Eight |
| Silver medal – second place | 2003 Milan | Coxless pair |
| Bronze medal – third place | 2002 Seville | Coxless pair |

Siniša Skelin (born 14 July 1974, in Split) is a Croatian rower who has won two Olympic medals. At the 2004 Summer Olympics in Athens he won a silver medal in coxless pairs with his younger brother Nikša.
