= Nikša Skelin =

Croatian rower

Medal record

Men's rowing

Representing Croatia

Olympic Games
Silver medal – second place	2004 Athens	Coxless pair
Bronze medal – third place	2000 Sydney	Eight

World Championships
Silver medal – second place	2001 Luzern	Eight
Silver medal – second place	2003 Milan	Coxless pair
Bronze medal – third place	2002 Seville	Coxless pair

Nikša Skelin (born 25 March 1978, in Split) is a Croatian rower who has won two Olympic medals. At the 2004 Summer Olympics in Athens he won a silver medal in coxless pairs with his older brother Siniša.
