= Rowing at the 1996 Summer Olympics – Men's lightweight coxless four =

Men's lightweight coxless four at the Games of the XXVI Olympiad
- Date: 22–28 July 1996
- Competitors: 68 from 17 nations

Medalists
| 1st place, gold medalist(s) | | Victor Feddersen; Niels Henriksen; Thomas Poulsen; Eskild Ebbesen | Denmark |
| 2nd place, silver medalist(s) | | Brian Peaker; Jeffrey Lay; Dave Boyes; Gavin Hassett | Canada |
| 3rd place, bronze medalist(s) | | Marc Schneider; Jeff Pfaendtner; David Collins; William Carlucci | United States |

The men's lightweight coxless four competition at the 1996 Summer Olympics in Atlanta, Georgia took place at Lake Lanier.

At international level for crew boats the limits are: Men: Crew average 70 kilograms (154.3 lb; 11 st 0.3 lb) – no rower over 72.5 kilograms (159.8 lb; 11 st 5.8 lb)

== Competition format ==
This rowing event is a sweep rowing event, meaning that each rower has one oar and rows on only one side. Four rowers crew each boat, and no coxswain is used. The competition consists of multiple rounds. Finals were held to determine the placing of each boat; these finals were given letters with those nearer to the beginning of the alphabet meaning a better ranking. Semifinals were named based on which finals they fed, with each semifinal having two possible finals.

With 14 boats in with heats, the best boats qualify directly for the semi-finals. All other boats progress to the repechage round, which offers a second chance to qualify for the semi-finals. The boats finishing in the 2 last positions from the repechage are eliminated from the competition. The best three boats in each of the two semi-finals qualify for final A, which determines places 1–6 (including the medals). Unsuccessful boats from semi-finals A/B go forward to final B, which determines places 7–12.

== Results ==
=== Heats ===
The first three boats of each heat advanced to the semifinals, the remainder goes to the repechage.

==== Heat 1 ====
| Rank | Rower | Country | Time | Notes |
|---|---|---|---|---|
| 1 | Victor Feddersen; Niels Henriksen; Thomas Poulsen; Eskild Ebbesen | Denmark | 6:20.13 | Q |
| 2 | Derek Holland; Sam Lynch; Neville Maxwell; Tony O'Connor | Ireland | 6:23.82 | R |
| 3 | Haimish Karrasch; Gary Lynagh; David Belcher; Simon Burgess | Australia | 6:25.87 | R |
| 4 | Andrea Re; Leonardo Pettinari; Ivano Zasio; Carlo Gaddi | Italy | 6:26.80 | R |
| 5 | David Lemon; James McNiven; Tom Kay; Benjamin Helm | Great Britain | 6:35.95 | R |
| 6 | Hernán Legizamón; Jorge Enríquez; Federico Querín; Gabriel Scortiquini | Argentina | 6:43.58 | R |

==== Heat 2 ====
| Rank | Rower | Country | Time | Notes |
|---|---|---|---|---|
| 1 | Derek Holland; Sam Lynch; Neville Maxwell; Tony O'Connor | Ireland | 6:00.99 | Q |
| 2 | Marc Schneider; Jeff Pfaendtner; David Collins; William Carlucci | United States | 6:21.85 | R |
| 3 | Vladimir Mityushov; Aleksandr Ustinov; Andrey Shevel; Dmitry Kartashov | Russia | 6:26.39 | R |
| 4 | Fernando Climent; David Morales; Juan Manuel Florido; Alfredo Girón | Spain | 6:28.05 | R |
| 5 | Katsuhiko Nakamizo; Yasunori Tanabe; Michinori Iwaguro; Kazuaki Mimoto | Japan | 6:30.16 | R |
| 6 | Samuel Aguiar; João Fernandes; Henrique Baixinho; Manuel Fernandes | Portugal | 7:37.13 | R |

==== Heat 3 ====
| Rank | Rower | Country | Time | Notes |
|---|---|---|---|---|
| 1 | Roger Tobler; Mark Rowand; Gareth Costa; Mike Hasselbach | South Africa | 6:19.98 | Q |
| 2 | Tobias Rose; Martin Weis; Michael Buchheit; Bernhard Stomporowski | Germany | 6:22.97 | R |
| 3 | Martin Kobau; Harald Hofmann; Christoph Schmölzer; Gernot Faderbauer | Austria | 6:24.59 | R |
| 4 | Michael Bänninger; Mathias Binder; Markus Feusi; Nicolai Kern | Switzerland | 6:26.5 | R |
| 5 | Stéphane Barré; Xavier Dorfman; Stéphane Guerinot; Henri-Pierre Dall'acqua | France | 6:26.84 | R |

=== Repechages ===
The first three boats of each repechage advanced to the semifinals, the remainder goes to Final C.

==== Repechage 1 ====
| Rank | Rower | Country | Time | Notes |
|---|---|---|---|---|
| 1 | Marc Schneider; Jeff Pfaendtner; David Collins; William Carlucci | United States | 5:58.58 | S |
| 2 | Haimish Karrasch; Gary Lynagh; David Belcher; Simon Burgess | Australia | 6:02.04 | S |
| 3 | Michael Bänninger; Mathias Binder; Markus Feusi; Nicolai Kern | Switzerland | 6:04.38 | S |
| 4 | Katsuhiko Nakamizo; Yasunori Tanabe; Michinori Iwaguro; Kazuaki Mimoto | Japan | 6:06.77 | C |
| 5 | Hernán Legizamón; Jorge Enríquez; Federico Querín; Gabriel Scortiquini | Argentina | 6:09.86 | C |

==== Repechage 2 ====
| Rank | Rower | Country | Time | Notes |
|---|---|---|---|---|
| 1 | Marc Schneider; Jeff Pfaendtner; David Collins; William Carlucci | United States | 5:58.58 | S |
| 2 | David Lemon; James McNiven; Tom Kay; Benjamin Helm | Great Britain | 6:02.65 | S |
| 3 | Martin Kobau; Harald Hofmann; Christoph Schmölzer; Gernot Faderbauer | Austria | 6:02.76 | S |
| 4 | Fernando Climent; David Morales; Juan Manuel Florido; Alfredo Girón | Spain | 6:03.33 | C |

==== Repechage 3 ====
| Rank | Rower | Country | Time | Notes |
|---|---|---|---|---|
| 1 | Tobias Rose; Martin Weis; Michael Buchheit; Bernhard Stomporowski | Germany | 5:58.90 | S |
| 2 | Andrea Re; Leonardo Pettinari; Ivano Zasio; Carlo Gaddi | Italy | 5:59.67 | S |
| 3 | Stéphane Barré; Xavier Dorfman; Stéphane Guerinot; Henri-Pierre Dall'acqua | France | 5:59.95 | S |
| 4 | Vladimir Mityushov; Aleksandr Ustinov; Andrey Shevel; Dmitry Kartashov | Russia | 6:00.03 | C |
| 5 | Samuel Aguiar; João Fernandes; Henrique Baixinho; Manuel Fernandes | Portugal | 6:15.82 | C |

=== Semifinals ===
The first three boats of each semifinal advanced to the Final A, the remainder go to Final B.

==== Semifinal 1 ====
| Rank | Rower | Country | Time | Notes |
|---|---|---|---|---|
| 1 | Victor Feddersen; Niels Henriksen; Thomas Poulsen; Eskild Ebbesen | Denmark | 6:13.21 | A |
| 2 | Haimish Karrasch; Gary Lynagh; David Belcher; Simon Burgess | Australia | 6:15.47 | A |
| 3 | Derek Holland; Sam Lynch; Neville Maxwell; Tony O'Connor | Ireland | 6:15.66 | A |
| 4 | Roger Tobler; Mark Rowand; Gareth Costa; Mike Hasselbach | South Africa | 6:16.65 | B |
| 5 | Andrea Re; Leonardo Pettinari; Ivano Zasio; Carlo Gaddi | Italy | 6:17.84 | B |
| 6 | Martin Kobau; Harald Hofmann; Christoph Schmölzer; Gernot Faderbauer | Austria | 6:22.60 | B |

==== Semifinal 2 ====
| Rank | Rower | Country | Time | Notes |
|---|---|---|---|---|
| 1 | Marc Schneider; Jeff Pfaendtner; David Collins; William Carlucci | United States | 6:09.89 | A |
| 2 | Brian Peaker; Jeffrey Lay; Dave Boyes; Gavin Hassett | Canada | 6:10.38 | A |
| 3 | Tobias Rose; Martin Weis; Michael Buchheit; Bernhard Stomporowski | Germany | 6:12.73 | A |
| 4 | Stéphane Barré; Xavier Dorfman; Stéphane Guerinot; Henri-Pierre Dall'acqua | France | 6:15.75 | B |
| 5 | David Lemon; James McNiven; Tom Kay; Benjamin Helm | Great Britain | 6:19.07 | B |
| 6 | Michael Bänninger; Mathias Binder; Markus Feusi; Nicolai Kern | Switzerland | 6:20.98 | B |

=== Finals ===
==== Final C ====
| Rank | Rower | Country | Time | Notes |
|---|---|---|---|---|
| 13 | Vladimir Mityushov; Aleksandr Ustinov; Andrey Shevel; Dmitry Kartashov | Russia | 6:23.59 | |
| 14 | Fernando Climent; David Morales; Juan Manuel Florido; Alfredo Girón | Spain | 6:25.81 | |
| 15 | Samuel Aguiar; João Fernandes; Henrique Baixinho; Manuel Fernandes | Portugal | 6:27.07 | |
| 16 | Katsuhiko Nakamizo; Yasunori Tanabe; Michinori Iwaguro; Kazuaki Mimoto | Japan | 6:28.60 | |
| 17 | Hernán Legizamón; Jorge Enríquez; Federico Querín; Gabriel Scortiquini | Argentina | 6:30.64 | |

==== Final B ====
| Rank | Rower | Country | Time | Notes |
|---|---|---|---|---|
| 7 | Stéphane Barré; Xavier Dorfman; Stéphane Guerinot; Henri-Pierre Dall'acqua | France | 6:02.39 | |
| 8 | Andrea Re; Leonardo Pettinari; Ivano Zasio; Carlo Gaddi | Italy | 6:03.25 | |
| 9 | Roger Tobler; Mark Rowand; Gareth Costa; Mike Hasselbach | South Africa | 6:04.13 | |
| 10 | David Lemon; James McNiven; Tom Kay; Benjamin Helm | Great Britain | 6:05.13 | |
| 11 | Michael Bänninger; Mathias Binder; Markus Feusi; Nicolai Kern | Switzerland | 6:05.92 | |
| 12 | Martin Kobau; Harald Hofmann; Christoph Schmölzer; Gernot Faderbauer | Austria | 6:06.09 | |

==== Final A ====
| Rank | Rower | Country | Time | Notes |
|---|---|---|---|---|
| 1st place, gold medalist(s) | Victor Feddersen; Niels Henriksen; Thomas Poulsen; Eskild Ebbesen | Denmark | 6:09.58 | |
| 2nd place, silver medalist(s) | Brian Peaker; Jeffrey Lay; Dave Boyes; Gavin Hassett | Canada | 6:10.13 | |
| 3rd place, bronze medalist(s) | Marc Schneider; Jeff Pfaendtner; David Collins; William Carlucci | United States | 6:12.29 | |
| 4 | Derek Holland; Sam Lynch; Neville Maxwell; Tony O'Connor | Ireland | 6:13.51 | |
| 5 | Tobias Rose; Martin Weis; Michael Buchheit; Bernhard Stomporowski | Germany | 6:14.79 | |
| 6 | Haimish Karrasch; Gary Lynagh; David Belcher; Simon Burgess | Australia | 6:18.16 | |
