= Portugal at the 1996 Summer Olympics =

- IOC code: POR
- NOC: Olympic Committee of Portugal
- Website: www.comiteolimpicoportugal.pt (in Portuguese)

in Atlanta
- Competitors: 107 (83 men and 24 women) in 18 sports
- Flag bearers: Fernanda Ribeiro (opening); Carla Sacramento (closing)
- Medals Ranked 47th: Gold 1 Silver 0 Bronze 1 Total 2

Summer Olympics appearances (overview)
- 1912; 1920; 1924; 1928; 1932; 1936; 1948; 1952; 1956; 1960; 1964; 1968; 1972; 1976; 1980; 1984; 1988; 1992; 1996; 2000; 2004; 2008; 2012; 2016; 2020; 2024

Portugal competed at the 1996 Summer Olympics in Atlanta, United States.

A delegation with a record number of 107 competitors (83 men and 24 women) participated in 79 events across 18 sports. Two medals were won, one of them being Portugal's third Olympic gold, thanks to Fernanda Ribeiro's surprise victory in the women's 10000m over the 5000m Olympic champion Wang Junxia. This third Olympic title in the athletics reinforced Portugal's strength in this sport and in particular the long-distance endurance events. A bronze was achieved by the 470 class male team, reviving a successful sailing tradition in this nation's Olympic delegations.

In Atlanta, Portugal debuted in cycling, women's sailing classes, slalom canoeing, and in newly promoted beach volleyball, almost grabbing a bronze medal in the latter, on its first participation. In their second appearance, the tennis male team succumbed yet again on the first round to a Bahamian team. After 68 years, Portugal sent a football team to the Olympics and, in the end, it repeated Amsterdam's fourth place.

== Medalists ==
=== Gold ===
- Fernanda Ribeiro — Athletics, Women's 10000m.

=== Bronze ===
- Hugo Rocha and Nuno Barreto — Sailing, Men's 470.

== Archery ==
Men's Individual Competition:

- Nuno Pombo

- Ranking round — 650 pts (→ 35th)

| Round | 1st half | 2nd half | Total |
|---|---|---|---|
| Pts | 322 | 328 | 650 |

- Elimination rounds — 148 pts (→ 58th)

- 1/32 finals — Pawel Szymczak (POL) (→ lost by 152–148, did not advance)

== Athletics ==
=== Men's events ===
100m:

- Luís Cunha

- Round 1 (heat 1) — 10.65 (→ 6th, did not advance)

800m:

- António Abrantes

- Round 1 (heat 5) — 1:47.73 (→ 5th, did not advance)

1500m:

- António Travassos

- Round 1 (heat 3) — 3:42.01 (→ 10th, did not advance)

- Luís Feiteira

- Round 1 (heat 4) — 3:38.09 (→ 5th, advanced as 4th fastest loser)
- Semi-final 1 — 3:40.31 (→ 11th, did not advance)

- Luís Jesus

- Round 1 (heat 2) — 3:44.65 (→ 7th, did not advance)

5000m:

- José Ramos

- Round 1 (heat 1) — 14:17.26 (→ 8th)
- Semi-final 1 — 14:24.81 (→ 15th, did not advance)

- Luís Jesus

- Round 1 (heat 3) — 14:08.87 (→ 11th, advanced as 9th fastest loser)
- Semi-final 2 — did not start

10000m:

- Alfredo Braz

- Round 1 (heat 2) — 28:50.58 (→ 14th, did not advance)

- Carlos Patrício

- Round 1 (heat 1) — 29:15.41 (→ 15th, did not advance)

- Paulo Guerra

- Round 1 (heat 2) — did not finish

Marathon:

- António Pinto — 2:16:41 (→ 14th)
- Domingos Castro — 2:18:03 (→ 25th)
- Manuel Matias — 2:20:58 (→ 46th)

20 km Walk:

- José Urbano — 1:25:32 (→ 31st)

50 km Walk:

- José Magalhães — 4:27:37 (→ 36th)

400m Hurdles:

- Carlos Silva

- Round 1 (heat 2) — 49.09s (→ 3rd, did not advance)

3000m Steeplechase:

- Eduardo Henriques

- Round 1 (heat 1) — 8:35.58 (→ 8th, did not advance)

- Vítor Almeida

- Round 1 (heat 2) — 8:48.16 (→ 11th, did not advance)

Long Jump:

- Carlos Calado

- Qualifying round (Group A) — 7,81 (→ 12th, did not advance)

| 1 | 2 | 3 | Result |
|---|---|---|---|
| 7,36 | 7,81 | X | 7,81 |

Pole Vault:

- Nuno Fernandes

- Qualifying round (Group A) — 5,60 (→ 10th, did not advance)

| 5,20 | 5,40 | 5,60 | 5,70 | Result |
|---|---|---|---|---|
| XO | O | XXO | XXX | 5,60 |

Triple Jump:

- Carlos Calado

- Qualifying round (Group A) — 16,65 (→ 10th, did not advance)

| 1 | 2 | 3 | Result |
|---|---|---|---|
| 16,43 | 16,65 | X | 16,65 |

=== Women's events ===
100m:

- Lucrécia Jardim

- Round 1 (heat 6) — 11.32 (→ 3rd)
- Round 2 (heat 2) — 11.37 (→ 4th)
- Semi-final 2 — 11.32 (→ 8th, did not advance)

200m:

- Lucrécia Jardim

- Round 1 (heat 2) — 22.95 (→ 3rd)
- Round 2 (heat 3) — 22.98 (→ 5th, did not advance)

800m:

- Eduarda Coelho

- Round 1 (heat 2) — 2:03.22 (→ 5th, did not advance)

1500m:

- Carla Sacramento

- Round 1 (heat 2) — 4:13.57 (→ 3rd)
- Semi-final 2 — 4:06.70 (→ 5th)
- Final — 4:03.91 (→ 6th)

5000m:

- Ana Dias

- Round 1 (heat 2) — 15:57.35 (→ 11th, did not advance)

10000m:

- Conceição Ferreira

- Round 1 (heat 1) — 33:40.76 (→ 14th, did not advance)

- Fernanda Ribeiro

- Round 1 (heat 2) — 31:36.32 (→ 3rd)
- Final — 31:01.63 OR (→ Gold Medal)

Marathon:

- Manuela Machado — 2:31:11 (→ 7th)
- Albertina Dias — 2:26:39 (→ 27th)
- Albertina Machado — 2:43:44 → (47th)

10 km Walk:

- Susana Feitor — 44:24 (→ 13th)

Discus Throw:

- Teresa Machado

- Qualifying round (Group A) — 62,02 (→ 5th)

| 1 | 2 | 3 | Result |
|---|---|---|---|
| 59,14 | 62,02 | | 62,02 |

- Final — 61,38 (→ 10th)

| 1 | 2 | 3 | Result |
|---|---|---|---|
| 61,38 | 60,48 | 60,02 | 61,38 |

Shot Put:

- Teresa Machado

- Qualifying round (Group A) — 15,91 (→ 12th, did not advance)

| 1 | 2 | 3 | Result |
|---|---|---|---|
| 15,91 | 15,62 | 15,60 | 15,91 |

== Beach volleyball ==
Men's Competition:

- João Brenha and Miguel Maia — 4th

- Round 1 — Michel Everaert and Sander Mulder (NED) (→ won by 15-8)
- Round 2 — Carl Henkel and Sinjin Smith (USA) (→ lost by 15-7)
- 17th place round — Javier Yuste Muniz and Miguel Angel Martin Prieto (ESP) (→ won by 15-8)
- 13th place round — Eduardo Esteban Martinez and Martin Alejo Conde (ARG) (→ won by 15-5)
- 9th place round — Emanuel Rego and José Marco de Melo Ferreira (BRA) (→ won by 15-12)
- 7th place round — Björn Maaseide and Jan Kvalheim (NOR) (→ won by 15-3)
- 5th place round — Carl Henkel and Sinjin Smith (USA) (→ won by 15-13)
- Semi-finals — Mike Dodd and Mike Whitmarsh (USA) (→ lost by 15-13)
- Bronze medal match — John Child and Mark Heese (CAN) (→ lost by 12-5, 12-8)

== Canoeing ==
=== Slalom ===
| Athlete | Event | Final | | | | | |
| Athlete | Event | Run 1 | Rank | Run 2 | Rank | Total | Rank |
|---|---|---|---|---|---|---|---|
| Aníbal Fernandes | Men's K-1 | 158.72 | 18 | 170.00 | 28 | 158.72 | 30 |
| Florence Ferreira Fernandes | Women's K-1 | 212.19 | 13 | 208.20 | 17 | 208.20 | 22 |

=== Sprint ===
Men

| Athlete | Event | Heats | | Repechage | | Semifinals | | Final | |
| Athlete | Event | Time | Rank | Time | Rank | Time | Rank | Time | Rank |
|---|---|---|---|---|---|---|---|---|---|
| Silvestre Pereira | C-1 500 m | 2:01.58 | 7 QS | — | | 1:57.95 | 7 | Did not advance | |
| Silvestre Pereira | C-1 1000 m | 4:42.72 | 8 QS | — | | 4:31.20 | 7 | Did not advance | |
| José Garcia | K-1 500 m | 1:52.76 | 8 QR | 1:56.10 | 9 | Did not advance | | | |
| José Garcia | K-1 1000 m | 3:56.06 | 4 QR | 4:05.68 | 3 QS | 3:48.86 | 8 | Did not advance | |
| Joaquim Queirós; Rui Fernandes | K-2 500 m | 1:33.86 | 5 QR | 1:37.50 | 3 QS | 1:31.56 | 6 | Did not advance | |
| Joaquim Queirós; Rui Fernandes | K-2 1000 m | 3:59.39 | 9 QR | 3:36.49 | 5 QS | 3:22.27 | 6 | Did not advance | |

== Cycling ==
Men's Road Race:

- Cândido Barbosa — 5:01:29 (→ 112th)
- José Azevedo — did not finish
- Nuno Marta — 4:56:49 (→ 78th)
- Orlando Rodrigues — 4:56:45 (→ 39th)
- Pedro Lopes — 4:56:45 (→ 48th)

Women's Road Race:

- Ana Barros — 2:37:06 (→ 23rd)

== Equestrianism ==
Individual Jumping:

- António Vozone

- Qualifying round — 13.75 penalty pts (→ 69th)

| Time | Penalties | | | Rank |
| Time | Obstacle | Time | Total | Rank |
|---|---|---|---|---|
| 111.50 | 12 | 1.75 | 13.75 | 69th |

- Miguel Leal

- Qualifying round — 12.00 penalty pts (→ 59th)

| Time | Penalties | | | Rank |
| Time | Obstacle | Time | Total | Rank |
|---|---|---|---|---|
| 102.37 | 12 | 0.00 | 12.00 | 59th |

== Fencing ==
One male fencer represented Portugal in 1996.

Men's épée

- Nuno Frazão

- Round A — Vitally Zakharov (BLR) (→ lost by 15-11, did not advance)

== Football ==
Men's Competition:

- Afonso Martins, Litos, Dani, Kenedy, Emílio Peixe, Hugo Porfírio, José Dominguez, Calado, José Vidigal, Andrade, Nuno Afonso, Nuno Gomes, Nuno Espírito Santo, Paulo Alves, Costinha, Beto, Rui Bento and Rui Jorge — 4th

- Group stage (A) — 5 pts (→ 2nd, 1 scored goal less than Argentina)

- July 20 | Washington D.C. — Tunisia (→ won by 2-0; goals by: Afonso Martins)
- July 22 | Washington D.C. — Argentina (→ draw 1-1; goals by: Nuno Gomes)
- July 24 | Washington D.C. — United States (→ draw 1-1; goals by: Paulo Alves)

- Quarter-finals

- July 27 | Miami, Florida — France (→ won by 2-1; goals by: Capucho, Calado)

- Semi-finals

- July 30 | Athens, Georgia — Argentina (→ lost by 2-0)

- Bronze medal match

- August 2 | Athens, Georgia — Brazil (→ lost by 5-0)

== Gymnastics ==
Women's Individual All-Round Competition:

- Diana Teixeira — 72.609 pts (→ 66th)

| Round | Balance Beam | Vault | Uneven Bars | Floor | Total |
|---|---|---|---|---|---|
| Ia | 8.812 | 9.425 | 9.112 | 9.187 | 36.536 |
| Ib | 8.437 | 9.337 | 9.437 | 8.862 | 36.073 |
| Total (Rank) | 17.249 (81st) | 18.762 (55th) | 18.549 (66th) | 18.049 (86th) | 72.609 |

== Judo ==
Men's Extra Lightweight (–60 kg):

- Pedro Caravana

Pool A
- Round 1 — Ewan Beaton (CAN) (→ won by waza-ari)
- Round 2 — Nigel Donohue (GBR) (→ lost by ippon)

Men's Half Lightweight (–65 kg):

- Michel Almeida

Pool A
- Round 1 — Jose Perez (PUR) (→ won by ippon)
- Round 2 — Francesco Giorgi (ITA) (→ won by koka)
- Round 3 — Taro Tan (CAN) (→ won by yuko)
- 1/4 finals — Udo Quellmalz (GER) (→ lost by ippon)
Repêchage A
- Round 1 — Bye
- Round 2 — Bye
- Round 3 — Israel Hernández Plana (CUB) (→ lost by ippon, did not advance)

Men's Lightweight (–71 kg):

- Guilherme Bentes

Pool A
- Round 1 — Bye
- Round 2 — Loris Mularoni (SMR) (→ won by ippon)
- Round 3 — Vladimeri Dgebuadze (GEO) (→ lost by yusei-gachi, did not advance)

Men's Half Heavyweight (–95 kg):

- Pedro Soares

Pool A
- Round 1 — Bye
- Round 2 — Detlef Knorrek (GER) (→ won by ippon)
- Round 3 — A. Sanchez Armentero (CUB) (→ won by ippon)
- 1/4 finals — Pawel Nastula (POL) (→ lost by ippon)
Repêchage A
- Round 1 — Bye
- Round 2 — Bye
- Round 3 — Antal Kovács (HUN) (→ lost by shido, did not advance)

Women's Lightweight (–56 kg):

- Filipa Cavalleri

Pool B
- Round 1 — Bye
- Round 2 — Ai-Chun Huang (TPE) (→ lost by yusei-gachi)

== Modern pentathlon ==
Men's Individual Competition:

- Manuel Barroso — 5246 pts (→ 19th)

| Event | Fencing | | | Swimming | | Shooting | | Cross-country | | Riding | | Total |
| Event | Vict. | Def. | Pen. | Time | Pen. | Hits | Pen. | Time | Pen. | Time | Pen. | Total |
|---|---|---|---|---|---|---|---|---|---|---|---|---|
| Event | 11 | 20 | 0 | 3:23.35 | 0 | 171 | 0 | 12:45.69 | 0 | 75.07 | 30 | Total |
| Pts (Rank) | 670 (28th) | | | 1248 (19th) | | 988 (24th) | | 1270 (7th) | | 1070 (5th) | | 5246 (19th) |

== Rowing ==
Men's Lightweight Coxless Four:

- Henrique Baixinho, João Fernandes, Manuel Fernandes (stern) and Samuel Aguiar (bow)

- Round 1 (heat 2) — 7:37.13 (→ 6th)
- Repêchage 3 — 6:15.82 (→ 5th)
- Final C — 6:27.07 (→ 3rd, 15th overall)

== Sailing ==
=== Men's events ===
Finn:

- Vasco Batista — 129 pts (→ 22nd)

| Race | 1 | 2 | 3 | 4 | 5 | 6 | 7 | 8 | 9 | 10 | Total | Net |
|---|---|---|---|---|---|---|---|---|---|---|---|---|
| Place | 16th | ~~23rd~~ | 23rd | 22nd | ~~26th~~ | 7th | 22nd | 14th | 16th | 9th | Total | Net |
| Pts | 16 | ~~23~~ | 23 | 22 | ~~26~~ | 7 | 22 | 14 | 16 | 9 | 178 | 129 |

Mistral:

- João Rodrigues — 42 pts (→ 7th)

| Race | 1 | 2 | 3 | 4 | 5 | 6 | 7 | 8 | 9 | Total | Net |
|---|---|---|---|---|---|---|---|---|---|---|---|
| Place | ~~14th~~ | 8th | 9th | 5th | 2nd | 4th | 6th | ~~12th~~ | 8th | Total | Net |
| Pts | ~~14~~ | 8 | 9 | 5 | 2 | 4 | 6 | ~~12~~ | 8 | 68 | 42 |

470:

- Hugo Rocha (skipper) and Nuno Barreto — 62 pts (→ Bronze Medal)

| Race | 1 | 2 | 3 | 4 | 5 | 6 | 7 | 8 | 9 | 10 | 11 | Total | Net |
|---|---|---|---|---|---|---|---|---|---|---|---|---|---|
| Place | 5th | 10th | ~~17th~~ | 7th | 4th | 8th | 9th | 5th | 2nd | 12th | ~~15th~~ | Total | Net |
| Pts | 5 | 10 | ~~17~~ | 7 | 4 | 8 | 9 | 5 | 2 | 12 | ~~15~~ | 94 | 62 |

=== Women's events ===
Europe:

- Joana Pratas — 209 pts (→ 25th)

| Race | 1 | 2 | 3 | 4 | 5 | 6 | 7 | 8 | 9 | 10 | 11 | Total | Net |
|---|---|---|---|---|---|---|---|---|---|---|---|---|---|
| Place | 25th | 24th | 23rd | ~~27th~~ | 25th | 23rd | 16th | 24th | 24th | 25th | ~~26th~~ | Total | Net |
| Pts | 25 | 24 | 23 | ~~27~~ | 25 | 23 | 16 | 24 | 24 | 25 | ~~26~~ | 262 | 209 |

Mistral:

- Catarina Fagundes — 133 pts (→ 21st)

| Race | 1 | 2 | 3 | 4 | 5 | 6 | 7 | 8 | 9 | Total | Net |
|---|---|---|---|---|---|---|---|---|---|---|---|
| Place | ~~False start~~ | 16th | 19th | 21st | 15th | ~~23rd~~ | 23rd | 19th | 20th | Total | Net |
| Pts | ~~28~~ | 16 | 19 | 21 | 15 | ~~23~~ | 23 | 19 | 20 | 184 | 133 |

=== Open events ===
Laser:

- Vasco Serpa — 74 pts (→ 7th)

| Race | 1 | 2 | 3 | 4 | 5 | 6 | 7 | 8 | 9 | 10 | 11 | Total | Net |
|---|---|---|---|---|---|---|---|---|---|---|---|---|---|
| Place | 8th | 3rd | 10th | ~~False start~~ | 3rd | 9th | 11th | 11th | 12th | ~~16th~~ | 7th | Total | Net |
| Pts | 8 | 3 | 10 | ~~57~~ | 3 | 9 | 11 | 11 | 12 | ~~16~~ | 7 | 147 | 74 |

Star:

- Diogo Cayolla and Raul Costa — 129 pts(→ 21st)

| Race | 1 | 2 | 3 | 4 | 5 | 6 | 7 | 8 | 9 | 10 | Total | Net |
|---|---|---|---|---|---|---|---|---|---|---|---|---|
| Place | 19th | 15th | 16th | 15th | 18th | 14th | ~~20th~~ | 18th | ~~21st~~ | 14th | Total | Net |
| Pts | 19 | 15 | 16 | 15 | 18 | 14 | ~~20~~ | 18 | ~~21~~ | 14 | 170 | 129 |

== Shooting ==
Men's Trap:

- João Rebelo

- Preliminary round — 120 hits (→ 13th, did not advance)

| Round | 1 | 2 | 3 | 4 | 5 | Total |
|---|---|---|---|---|---|---|
| Hits | 25 | 23 | 22 | 25 | 25 | 120 |

- Manuel Vieira

- Preliminary round — 122 hits (→ 7th, did not advance)

| Round | 1 | 2 | 3 | 4 | 5 | Total |
|---|---|---|---|---|---|---|
| Hits | 24 | 23 | 25 | 25 | 25 | 122 |

Women's 10m Air Rifle:

- Carla Ribeiro

- Preliminary round — 375hits (→ 48th, did not advance)

| Round | 1 | 2 | 3 | 4 | Total |
|---|---|---|---|---|---|
| Hits | 95 | 93 | 91 | 96 | 375 |

- Sara Antunes

- Preliminary round — 377 hits (→ 47th, did not advance)

| Round | 1 | 2 | 3 | 4 | Total |
|---|---|---|---|---|---|
| Hits | 91 | 94 | 93 | 99 | 377 |

Women's 50m Rifle 3 Positions:

- Carla Ribeiro

- Preliminary round — 568 hits (→ 32nd, did not advance)

| Position | Prone | Knee | Standing | Total |
|---|---|---|---|---|
| Hits | 197 | 180 | 191 | 568 |

- Sara Antunes

- Preliminary round — 571 hits (→ 29th, did not advance)

| Position | Prone | Knee | Standing | Total |
|---|---|---|---|---|
| Hits | 195 | 185 | 191 | 571 |

== Swimming ==
=== Men's events ===
50m Freestyle:

- Paulo Trindade

- Heats (heat 5) — 23.73 (→ 5th, did not advance – 41st overall)

1500m Freestyle:

- Pedro Ferreira

- Heats (heat 2) — 16:34.55 (→ 7th, did not advance)

100m Backstroke:

- Nuno Laurentino

- Heats (heat 4) — 57.59 (→ 7th, did not advance – 31st overall)

200m Backstroke:

- Nuno Laurentino

- Heats (heat 3) — 2:05.95 (→ 7th, did not advance – 29th overall)

200m Breaststroke:

- José Couto

- Heats (heat 2) — 2:17.28 (→ 2nd, did not advance – 18th overall)

200m Butterfly:

- Diogo Madeira

- Heats (heat 3) — 2:01.58 (→ 3rd, did not advance – 25th overall)

4 × 100 m Medley Relay:

- José Couto, Miguel Cabrita, Miguel Machado and Nuno Laurentino

- Heats (heat 4) — disqualified

=== Women's events ===
200m Freestyle:

- Ana Alegria

- Heats (heat 3) — 2:05.16 (→ 4th, did not advance – 29th overall)

400m Freestyle:

- Ana Alegria

- Heats (heat 2) — 4:27.19 (→ 8th, did not advance)

100m Backstroke:

- Maria Santos

- Heats (heat 5) — 1:04.84 (→ 8th, did not advance – 22nd overall)

200m Backstroke:

- Petra Chaves

- Heats (heat 2) — 2:20.49 (→ 3rd, did not advance – 26th overall)

200m Breaststroke:

- Joana Soutinho

- Heats (heat 2) — 1:13.73 (→ 3rd, did not advance – 34th overall)

100m Butterfly:

- Ana Francisco

- Heats (heat 2) — 1:02.98 (→ 1st, did not advance – 26th overall)

200m Butterfly:

- Ana Francisco

- Heats (heat 3) — 2:17.61 (→ 7th, did not advance)

200m Individual Medley:

- Petra Chaves

- Heats (heat 2) — 2:22.03 (→ 3rd, did not advance – 33rd overall)

4 × 100 m Medley Relay:

- Ana Alegria, Ana Francisco, Joana Soutinho and Maria Santos

- Heats (heat 3) — 4:21.61 (→ 7th, did not advance – 21st overall)

== Tennis ==
Men's Doubles Competition:

- Bernardo Mota and Emanuel Couto

- Round 1 — Mark Knowles and Roger Smith (BAH) (→ lost by 7-6, 7-6 – did not advance)

== Weightlifting ==
Men's Bantamweight (–59 kg):

- Nuno Alves

Group B — 237,5 kg (→ 14th)

| Event | Attempt | | | Result |
| Event | 1 | 2 | 3 | Result |
|---|---|---|---|---|
| Snatch | | | | 102,5 |
| Clean & Jerk | | | | 135,0 |
| Total | | | | 237,5 |

== Wrestling ==
Men's Greco-Roman Bantamweight (–57 kg):

- David Maia

- Round 1 — Luis Sarmiento Hernández (CUB) (→ lost by 5-0)
- Round 2 — Armando Fernández (MEX) (→ lost by 7-3, did not advance)

== Officials ==
- Vítor Fonseca da Mota (chief of mission)
- Avelino Corbal Simões Azevedo (beach volleyball)
- Nelo Vingada (football coach)
- Agostinho Oliveira (football coach)

== Notes ==
- Watkins, Ginger T., ed. (1997). The Official Report of the Centennial Olympic Games, Volume III The Competition Results (PDF). Atlanta: Peachtree Publishers. ISBN 1-56145-150-9.
- "Olympic Medal Winners". International Olympic Committee.
