= Rowing at the 1997 Mediterranean Games =

Rowing competition

- Location: Bari, Italy
- Dates: June 1997

The Rowing Competition at the 1997 Mediterranean Games was held in Bari, Italy.

== Medalists ==
Event	Gold	Silver	Bronze
Single sculls	Iztok Čop (SLO)	Ali Ibrahim (EGY)	Giovanni Calabrese (ITA)
Double sculls	Italy (ITA); Alessio Sartori; Agostino Abbagnale	Croatia (CRO); Hrvoje Telišman; Daniel Bajlo	France (FRA); Frédéric Kowal; Yvan Deslavière
Coxless pairs	France (FRA); Jean-Christophe Rolland; Michel Andrieux	Croatia (CRO); Igor Boraska; Tihomir Franković	Italy (ITA); Marco Palmisano; Rosario Gioia
Coxless fours	Croatia (CRO); Oliver Martinov; Krešimir Čuljak; Marko Banović; Branimir Vujević	Italy (ITA); Marco Penna; Riccardo De Rossi; Valter Molea; Raffaello Leonardo	Slovenia (SLO); Denis Žvegelj; Jani Klemenčič; Milan Janša; Sadik Mujkič
Lightweight double sculls	Italy (ITA); Leonardo Pettinari; Michelangelo Crispi	France (FRA); Pascal Touron; Frederic Dufour	Spain (ESP); Josep Colome; Carlos Dinares
Lightweight quadruple sculls	France (FRA); Xavier Dorfman; Laurent Porchier; Frederic Pinon; Enri Pierre Dall ́Acqua	Italy (ITA); Carlo Grande; Stefano Fraquelli; Ivano Zasio; Andrea Re	Spain (ESP); Oscar Arjona; Juan Manuel Florido; Alfredo Girón; Raimundo Piera

== Medal table ==
Rank	Nation	Gold	Silver	Bronze	Total
1	Italy (ITA)	2	2	1	5
2	France (FRA)	2	1	1	4
3	Croatia (CRO)	1	2	0	3
4	Slovenia (SLO)	1	0	1	2
5	Egypt (EGY)	0	1	0	1
6	Spain (ESP)	0	0	2	2
Totals (6 entries)		6	6	5	17
