= Canoeing at the 1996 Summer Olympics – Men's slalom K-1 =

Men's slalom K-1 at the Games of the XXVI Olympiad
- Venue: Ocoee Whitewater Center
- Dates: 28 July 1996
- Competitors: 44 from 28 nations

Medalists
1st place, gold medalist(s)		Oliver Fix	Germany
2nd place, silver medalist(s)		Andraž Vehovar	Slovenia
3rd place, bronze medalist(s)		Thomas Becker	Germany

These are the results of the men's K-1 slalom competition in canoeing at the 1996 Summer Olympics. The K-1 (kayak single) event is raced by one-man kayaks through a whitewater course. The venue for the 1996 Olympic competition was along the Toccoa/Ocoee River near the Georgia-Tennessee state line.

== Medalists ==
Gold	Silver	Bronze
Oliver Fix (GER)	Andraž Vehovar (SLO)	Thomas Becker (GER)

== Results ==
The 44 competitors each took two runs through the whitewater slalom course on July 28. The best result of the runs counted for the event.

Rank	Name	Run 1			Run 2			Result
Rank	Name	Time	Points	Total	Time	Points	Total	Total
Gold	Oliver Fix (GER)	141.22	0	141.22	154.75	55	209.75	141.22
Silver	Andraž Vehovar (SLO)	145.38	0	145.38	141.65	0	141.65	141.65
Bronze	Thomas Becker (GER)	144.48	0	144.48	142.79	0	142.79	142.79
4	Laurent Burtz (FRA)	154.18	5	159.18	144.33	0	144.33	144.33
5	Ian Wiley (IRL)	145.21	0	145.21	147.26	60	207.26	145.21
6	Richard Weiss (USA)	144.45	5	149.45	145.78	0	145.78	145.78
7	Jernej Abramič (SLO)	151.59	0	156.59	145.81	0	145.81	145.81
8	Jochen Lettmann (GER)	145.99	0	145.99	140.97	10	150.97	145.99
9	Ian Raspin (GBR)	146.15	0	146.15	149.11	60	209.11	146.15
10	Miroslav Stanovský (SVK)	155.17	10	165.17	146.59	0	146.59	146.59
11	Michael Reys (NED)	146.79	0	146.79	150.49	60	210.49	146.79
12	Scott Shipley (USA)	143.31	5	148.31	144.34	5	149.34	148.31
13	Peter Nagy (SVK)	151.54	60	211.54	148.35	0	148.35	148.35
14	Paul Ratcliffe (GBR)	148.49	5	153.59	143.37	5	148.37	148.37
15	David Ford (CAN)	149.23	0	149.23	145.83	50	195.83	149.23
16	Andrej Glucks (CRO)	155.75	0	155.75	150.12	0	150.12	150.12
17	Pierpaolo Ferrazzi (ITA)	146.10	50	196.10	145.76	5	150.76	150.76
18	Luboš Hilgert (CZE)	146.10	5	151.10	146.99	50	196.99	151.10
19	Jiří Prskavec (CZE)	182.29	115	297.29	151.15	0	151.15	151.15
20	Eric Giddens (USA)	151.15	50	201.15	146.65	5	151.65	151.65
21	Aldis Kļaviņš (LAT)	156.08	10	166.08	152.67	0	152.67	152.67
22	Javier Etxaniz (ESP)	160.81	60	220.81	148.77	5	153.77	153.77
23	Jean-Yves Cheutin (FRA)	160.13	60	220.13	148.95	5	153.95	153.95
24	Richard MacQuire (AUS)	148.97	5	153.97	153.07	0	153.07	153.07
25	Shaun Pearce (GBR)	154.76	0	154.76	152.94	15	167.94	154.76
26	Fedja Marušič (SLO)	145.70	10	155.70	153.24	5	158.24	155.70
27	Jerzy Sandera (POL)	152.78	20	172.78	155.79	0	155.79	155.79
28	Helmut Oblinger (AUT)	154.22	5	159.22	157.06	0	157.06	157.06
29	Lazar Popovski (MKD)	159.53	0	159.53	158.30	0	158.30	158.30
30	Aníbal Fernandes (POR)	158.72	0	158.72	160.00	10	170.00	158.72
31	Owen Hughes (NZL)	154.79	10	164.79	155.25	5	160.25	160.25
32	Gustavo Selbach (BRA)	153.33	15	168.33	162.48	0	162.48	162.48
33	Benjamin Kvanli (GUA)	162.28	20	182.28	159.34	5	164.34	164.34
34	Esteban Aracama (ESP)	149.66	15	164.66	155.17	110	265.17	155.17
35	Anton Lazko (RUS)	161.11	5	166.11	155.56	135	290.56	166.11
36	Tsuyoshi Fujino (JPN)	162.26	5	167.26	157.94	10	167.94	167.26
37	Frits Sins (NED)	154.42	55	209.42	149.33	20	169.33	169.33
38	Matthew Pallister (AUS)	161.88	75	236.88	159.19	20	179.19	179.19
39	Roger Madrigal (CRC)	175.34	5	180.34	164.97	55	219.97	180.34
40	Andrew Boland (IRL)	191.92	10	201.92	174.51	10	184.51	184.51
41	Samir Karabašić (BIH)	213.01	35	248.01	191.85	5	196.85	196.85
42	Manuel Köhler (AUT)	156.01	105	261.01	144.54	65	209.54	209.54
43	Sal Ayob (MAS)	189.15	70	259.15	174.54	55	229.54	229.54
44	Scott Muller (PAN)	232.24	10	242.24	207.89	35	242.89	242.24
