= Selbach (disambiguation) =

Selbach is a municipality in western Germany.

Selbach may also refer to:

== Places ==
- Selbach, Rio Grande do Sul, a municipality in Brazil

== Given name ==
- Selbach mac Ferchair (died 730), Irish king

== Surname ==
- Gustavo Selbach (born 1974), Brazilian slalom canoer
- Jopie Selbach (1918–1998), Dutch swimmer
- Kip Selbach (1872–1956), American baseball player
- Leonardo Selbach (born 1971), Brazilian slalom canoer, brother of Gustavo Selbach
- Toetie Selbach (born 1934), Dutch Olympic gymnast
- Tootje Selbach (born 1928), Dutch Olympic gymnast, sister of Toetie Selbach
- Udo Sellbach (1927-2006), German-Australian visual artist and educator
