= Andrew Stunell (rower) =

Australian rower

Sport
- Country: Australia
- Sport: Rowing
- Club: Adelaide Rowing Club
Medal record
Men's rowing
Representing Australia
World Rowing Championships
Silver medal – second place	1994 Indianapolis	LM4-
Commonwealth Rowing Championships
Gold medal – first place	1994 Ontario	LM4-

Andrew Stunell is an Australian former representative lightweight rower. He was a seven time Australian national champion, won a silver medal at the 1994 World Rowing Championships and a gold medal at the 1994 Commonwealth Rowing Championships.

== Club and state rowing ==
Raised in South Australia, Stunell's senior rowing was from the Adelaide Rowing Club.

Stunell first made South Australian state selection in the 1990 youth eight contesting the Noel F Wilkinson Trophy at the Interstate Regatta within the Australian Rowing Championships. From 1992 he rowed in South Australian lightweight fours contesting the Penrith Cup. He was in the three seat of the 1992 four and the 1993 and 1994 victorious South Australian fours.

== International representative rowing ==
Stunell made his first Australian representative appearance in 1992 in an U23 lightweight four which contested an U23 Trans-Tasman series against New Zealand crews. The Australian lightweight four won all three of their match races.

Stunell made his Australian senior representative debut in 1993 in the men's lightweight coxless four at the 1993 World Rowing Championships in Racice. The Australian four rowed to a fourth.

At the Indianapolis 1994 Stunell and his South Australian team-mate James Seppelt rowed in a lightweight coxless four with Bruce Hick and Gary Lynagh. Stunell was in bow seat and the four achieved a silver medal.

The following year at the 1995 World Rowing Championships he held his seat in the Australian lightweight coxless four. They finished in tenth place and it was Stunell's last Australian representative appearance.
