= James Seppelt =

Australian rower

Sport
- Country: Australia
- Sport: Rowing
Medal record
Men's rowing
Representing Australia
World Rowing Championships
Silver medal – second place	1994 Indianapolis	LM4-
Commonwealth Rowing Championships
Gold medal – first place	1994 Ontario	LM4-

James Seppelt is an Australian former representative lightweight rower. He was a seven time Australian national champion, won a silver medal at the 1994 World Rowing Championships and a gold medal at the 1994 Commonwealth Rowing Championships.

== Club and state rowing ==
Raised in South Australia, Seppelt's senior rowing was from the Adelaide Rowing Club.

Seppelt first made South Australian state selection in the 1991 youth eight contesting the Noel F Wilkinson Trophy at the Interstate Regatta within the Australian Rowing Championships. From 1992 he rowed in South Australian lightweight fours contesting the Penrith Cup. He stroked the 1992 four, the 1993 victorious South Australian four, rowed in the two seat of the victorious 1994 SA four, and rowed again in the 1996 SA Penrith Cup four.

== International representative rowing ==
Seppelt made his first Australian representative appearance in 1992 in an U23 lightweight four which contested an U23 Trans-Tasman series against New Zealand crews. The Australian lightweight four won all three of their match races.

Seppelt made his Australian senior representative debut in 1993 in the men's lightweight coxless four at the 1993 World Rowing Championships in Racice. The Australian four rowed to a fourth. He rowed again in the Australian lightweight eight at the 1994 World Rowing Championships where that crew placed sixth.

At the Indianapolis 1994 Seppelt and his South Australian team-mate Andrew Stunnel rowed in a lightweight coxless four with Bruce Hick and Gary Lynagh. Seppelt stroked the four to a silver medal. That same crew contested the 1994 Commonwealth Rowing Championships held in association with the 1994 Commonwealth Games. They won gold at those championships. The following year at the 1995 World Rowing Championships he again stroked the Australian lightweight coxless four. They finished in tenth place and it was Seppelt's last Australian representative appearance.
