= 1994 World Rowing Championships =

International rowing event

- Venue: Eagle Creek Park
- Location: Indianapolis, United States
- Dates: 11 to 18 September

The 1994 World Rowing Championships were World Rowing Championships that were held from 11 to 18 September 1994 at Eagle Creek Park, Indianapolis, United States.

== Medal summary ==
=== Men's events ===
Event	Gold	Time	Silver	Time	Bronze	Time
M1x	Germany; André Willms	6:46.33	Switzerland; Xeno Müller	6:48.10	Slovenia; Iztok Čop	6:49.33
M2x	Norway; Lars Bjønness; Rolf Thorsen	6:08.33	Germany; Christian Händle; Peter Uhrig	6:08.88	France; Samuel Barathay; Yves Lamarque	6:10.03
M4x	Italy; Alessandro Corona; Rossano Galtarossa; Massimo Paradiso; Alessio Sartori	5:37.68	Ukraine; Oleksandr Marchenko; Leonid Shaposhnikov; Mykola Chupryna; Oleksandr Zaskalko	5:39.11	Germany; Andreas Hajek; André Steiner; Stephan Volkert; Torsten Weishaupt	5:39.71
M2+	Croatia; Igor Boraska; Tihomir Franković; Milan Razov	6:42.16	Italy; Carmine Abbagnale; Gioacchino Cascone; Antonio Cirillo	6:42.98	Romania; Nicolae Spîrcu; Ioan Vizitiu; Marin Gheorghe	6:46.99
M2-	Great Britain; Matthew Pinsent; Steve Redgrave	6:18.65	Germany; Peter Hoeltzenbein; Thorsten Streppelhoff	6:19.75	Australia; Robert Walker; Richard Wearne	6:20.25
M4+	Romania; Valentin Robu; Iulică Ruican; Viorel Talapan; Florian Tudor; Marin Gheorghe	6:06.69	United States; Bill Cooper; Adam Holland; Edward Murphy; Chris Swan; Peter Cipollone	6:06.98	Netherlands; Michiel Bartman; Jochen Jansen; Pim Vos; Marc Eecen; Kagan Turkcan	6:07.73
M4-	Italy; Riccardo Dei Rossi; Raffaello Leonardo; Valter Molea; Carlo Mornati	5:48.44	France; Michel Andrieux; Daniel Fauché; Philippe Lot; Jean-Christophe Rolland	5:49.82	Great Britain; Tim Foster; Rupert Obholzer; Greg Searle; Jonny Searle	5:50.37
M8+	United States; Jon Brown; Sean Hall; Fredric Honebein; Robert Kaehler; Jeffrey Klepacki; Jamie Koven; John McKibbon; Don Smith; Steven Segaloff	5:24.50	Netherlands; Kai Compagner; Nico Rienks; Niels van der Zwan; Jaap Krijtenburg; Sjors van Iwaarden; Niels van Steenis; Henk-Jan Zwolle; Ronald Florijn; Jeroen Duyster	5:25.10	Romania; Dorin Alupei; Vasile Năstase; Dragoș Neagu; Cornel Nemțoc; Valentin Robu; Iulică Ruican; Viorel Talapan; Florian Tudor; Marin Gheorghe	5:27.08
Men's lightweight events
LM1x	Great Britain; Peter Haining	6:53.48	Ireland; Niall O'Toole	6:56.33	Denmark; Karsten Nielsen	6:56.99
LM2x	Italy; Michelangelo Crispi; Francesco Esposito	6:18.10	New Zealand; Rob Hamill; Mike Rodger	6:20.14	Switzerland; Markus Gier; Michael Gier	6:20.85
LM4x	Austria; Gernot Faderbauer; Walter Rantasa; Christoph Schmölzer; Wolfgang Sigl	5:46.75	Italy; Enrico Gandola; Paolo Pittino; Ivano Zasio; Massimo Guglielmi	5:48.83	Portugal; Henrique Baixinho; Luis Fonseca; José Leitão; Luis Ahrens Teixeira	5:49.64
LM2-	Italy; Carlo Gaddi; Leonardo Pettinari	6:34.70	Russia; Vladimir Mitiusjev; Alexandr Ustinov	6:39.92	Ireland; Neville Maxwell; Tony O'Connor	6:39.96
LM4-	Denmark; Eskild Ebbesen; Victor Feddersen; Niels Henriksen; Thomas Poulsen	5:53.77	Australia; Bruce Hick; Gary Lynagh; James Seppelt; Andrew Stunell	5:56.24	Germany; Stephan Fahrig; Oliver Rau; Bernhard Stomporowski; Martin Weis	5:57.07
LM8+	Great Britain; Christopher Bates; Simon Cox; Steve Ellis; Toby Hessian; Tom Kay; Dave Lemon; Jim McNiven; Carl Smith; John Deakin	5:31.00	Denmark; Johnny Bo Andersen; Morten Bagger; Michael Hjelmer; Jeppe Jensen Kollat; Michael Jensen; Hardy Olesen; Bo Vestergaard; Thomas Croft Buck; Stephen Masters	5:31.36	Italy; Salvatore Amitrano; Enrico Barbaranelli; Massimiliano Faraci; Pasquale Marigliano; Fabrizio Ravasi; Andrea Re; Roberto Romanini; Carmine Somma; Gaetano Iannuzzi	5:34.63

=== Women's events ===
Event	Gold	Time	Silver	Time	Bronze	Time
W1x	Denmark; Trine Hansen	7:23.96	Germany; Kathrin Boron	7:24.90	Belgium; Annelies Bredael	7:25.56
W2x	New Zealand; Philippa Baker; Brenda Lawson	6:45.30	Canada; Kathleen Heddle; Marnie McBean	6:46.17	Germany; Angela Schuster; Jana Thieme	6:47.16
W4x	Germany; Kerstin Köppen; Kristina Mundt; Katrin Rutschow; Jana Sorgers	6:11.73	China; Cao Mianyin; Liu Xirong; Zhang Xiuyun; Zhao Guifeng	6:15.74	Ukraine; Svitlana Maziy; Dina Miftakhutdynova; Olena Ronzhyna; Tetiana Ustiuzhanina	6:18.05
W2-	France; Hélène Cortin; Christine Gossé	7:01.77	Romania; Iulia Bobeică-Bulie; Elisabeta Lipă	7:05.45	Australia; Carmen Klomp-Wearne; Anna Ozolins	7:07.60
W4-	Netherlands; Femke Boelen; Elien Meijer; Muriel van Schilfgaarde; Rita de Jong	6:30.76	United States; Catriona Fallon; Amy Fuller; Anne Kakela; Monica Tranel-Michini	6:31.92	Australia; Alison Davies; Kate Slatter; Megan Still; Victoria Toogood	6:32.85
W8+	Germany; Kathrin Haacker; Andrea Klapheck; Micaela Schmidt; Doreen Martin; Dana Pyritz; Antje Rehaag; Ute Wagner; Stefani Werremeier; Doreen Schnell	6:07.42	United States; Jennifer Dore; Catriona Fallon; Amy Fuller; Anne Kakela; Laurel Korholz; Elizabeth McCagg; Katherine Scanlon Lewis; Monica Tranel-Michini; Yasmin Farooq	6:08.24	Romania; Angela Alupei; Iulia Bobeică-Bulie; Veronica Cochela; Lenuta Doroftei; Doina Ignat; Elisabeta Lipă; Ioana Olteanu; Anca Tănase; Cristina Ilie	6:08.55
Women's lightweight events
LW1x	Romania; Constanța Burcică	7:34.17	Netherlands; Laurien Vermulst	7:35.81	Switzerland; Pia Vogel	7:38.63
LW2x	Canada; Colleen Miller; Wendy Wiebe	6:54.85	China; Ou Shaoyan; Zhong Aifang	6:56.83	United States; Lindsay Burns; Teresa Zarzeczny	6:57.76
LW4-	United States; Christine Collins; Danika Holbrook-Harris; Charlotte Hollings; Linda Muri	6:36.40	Great Britain; Jane Brownless; Annamarie Hall; Annamarie Stapleton; Tonia Williams	6:37.28	China; Ding Yahong; Li Fei; Liao Xiaoli; Fang Wang	6:38.27

== Medal table ==
Place	Nation	1st place, gold medalist(s)	2nd place, silver medalist(s)	3rd place, bronze medalist(s)	Total
1	Italy	4	2	1	7
2	Germany	3	3	3	9
3	Great Britain	3	1	1	5
4	United States	2	3	1	6
5	Romania	2	1	3	6
6	Denmark	2	1	1	4
7	Netherlands	1	2	1	4
8	France	1	1	1	3
9	Canada	1	1		2
9	New Zealand	1	1		2
11	Austria	1			1
11	Croatia	1			1
11	Norway	1			1
14	China		2	1	3
15	Australia		1	3	4
16	Switzerland		1	2	3
17	Ireland		1	1	2
17	Ukraine		1	1	2
19	Russia		1		1
20	Belgium			1	1
20	Portugal			1	1
20	Slovenia			1	1
Total		23	23	23	69
