= Peru at the 1992 Summer Olympics =

- IOC code: PER
- NOC: Peruvian Olympic Committee

in Barcelona
- Competitors: 16 (12 men and 4 women) in 9 sports
- Flag bearer: Francisco Boza
- Medals Ranked 49th: Gold 0 Silver 1 Bronze 0 Total 1

Summer Olympics appearances (overview)
- 1900; 1904–1932; 1936; 1948; 1952; 1956; 1960; 1964; 1968; 1972; 1976; 1980; 1984; 1988; 1992; 1996; 2000; 2004; 2008; 2012; 2016; 2020; 2024

Peru competed at the 1992 Summer Olympics in Barcelona, Spain. 16 competitors, 12 men and 4 women, took part in 18 events in 9 sports.

== Medalists ==
| Medal | Name | Sport | Event | Date |
|---|---|---|---|---|
| Silver | Juan Giha | Shooting | Skeet | July 28 |

== Competitors ==
The following is the list of number of competitors in the Games.

| Sport | Men | Women | Total |
|---|---|---|---|
| Athletics | 1 | 1 | 2 |
| Canoeing | 1 | 0 | 1 |
| Cycling | 1 | 0 | 1 |
| Modern pentathlon | 1 | – | 1 |
| Shooting | 2 | 0 | 2 |
| Swimming | 1 | 1 | 2 |
| Table tennis | 2 | 2 | 4 |
| Tennis | 2 | 0 | 2 |
| Weightlifting | 1 | – | 1 |
| Total | 12 | 4 | 16 |

== Athletics ==
Men's 10.000 metres

- Juan José Castillo

- Heat — 30:04.60 (→ did not advance)

Women's Marathon

- Ena Guevara — 3:05.50 (→ 34th place)

== Canoeing ==
Men's Kayak Slalom Singles

- Eric Arenas

== Cycling ==
One male cyclist represented Peru in 1992.

Men's individual pursuit

- Tony Ledgard

== Modern pentathlon ==
One male pentathlete represented Peru in 1992.

Individual:

- Luis Alberto Urteaga → 65th place (3503 points)

== Shooting ==
Mixed Trap

- Francisco Boza

Mixed Skeet

- Juan Giha

== Swimming ==
Men's 100m Backstroke

- Alejandro Alvizuri

- Heat – 57.72 (→ did not advance, 29th place)

Men's 200m Backstroke

- Alejandro Alvizuri

- Heat – 2:03.10 (→ did not advance, 20th place)

Men's 200m Individual Medley

- Alejandro Alvizuri

- Heat – 2:15.10 (→ did not advance, 45th place)

Women's 100m Breaststroke

- Claudia Velásquez

- Heat – 1:17.80 (→ did not advance, 39th place)

Women's 200m Breaststroke

- Claudia Velásquez

- Heat – 2:47.31 (→ did not advance, 37th place)

== Table tennis ==
Men's singles

- Yair Nathan

Men's doubles

- Walter Nathan and Yair Nathan

Women's singles

- Eliana González

Women's doubles

- Eliana González and Magaly Montes

== Tennis ==
Men's Singles Competition

- Pablo Arraya
  1. First round — Lost to Javier Frana (Argentina) 2-6, 0-6, 7-6, 7-6, 2-6
- Jaime Yzaga
  1. First round — Defeated Leander Paes (India) 1-6, 7-6, 6-0, 6-0
  2. Second round — Lost to Pete Sampras (USA) 3-6, 0-6, 6-3, 1-6

== Weightlifting ==
Men's Super-Heavyweight

- Rolando Marchinares

== See also ==
- Peru at the 1991 Pan American Games
