= Stephen Hawkins =

Australian rower

Steve Hawkins
Personal information
- Born: 14 January 1971 (age 55) Hobart, Tasmania, Australia

Sport
- Sport: Rowing
- Club: Lindisfarne
Medal record
Men's rowing
Representing Australia
Olympic Games
Gold medal – first place	1992 Barcelona	Double sculls
World Rowing Championships
Gold medal – first place	1991 Vienna	Lwt quad sculls
Silver medal – second place	1993 Račice	Lwt single sculls
Bronze medal – third place	1990 Tasmania	Lwt quad sculls

Stephen Mark Hawkins OAM (born 14 January 1971) is an Australian former national champion, World Champion and Olympic gold medal winning lightweight rower.

== Club and state rowing ==
Hawkins' senior rowing was from the Lindisfarne Rowing Club near Hobart. He commenced contesting the national lightweight single sculls title at the Australian Rowing Championships in 1990, coached by his father Stephen Hawkins Snr. In 1991 he beat out his Tasmanian rival Simon Burgess and claimed his first national lightweight championship in the single sculls. He won that same title at Australian Rowing Championships in 1993 and 1994. In 1992 he placed second behind Peter Antonie in the heavyweight single sculls Australian championship.

From 1989 to 1994 he was the Tasmanian state representative picked to race the President's Cup – the open heavyweight single scull – at the Interstate Regatta within the Australian Rowing Championships. He won the interstate championship for Tasmania in 1993.

== International representative rowing ==
Hawkins first competed at a FISA event at the 1990 World Rowing Championships in his home state of Tasmania – in a lightweight quad scull with Burgess, Gary Lynagh and Bruce Hick. They won the bronze medal. The following year at Vienna 1991 that same crew won gold and a World Championship title. They rowed through the field and won by 0.23 seconds.

In 1992 Hawkins was selected in the Olympic heavyweight double scull with Peter Antonie to compete at Barcelona 1992. Antonie, a veteran of 15 years of international competition was, like Hawkins a lightweight and they were respectively Australia's #1 and #2 ranked scullers ahead of the heavyweights Richard Powell and Jason Day. The selectors felt that Antonie would be unlikely to win the single scull event but using a weight corrected ergo score methodology determined that Antonie and Hawkins together could be competitive in the double. They prepared perfectly, raced superbly and won the Olympic gold.

For Roudnice 1993 and Indianapolis 1994 Hawkins was selected as Australia's lightweight single sculler. He rowed to second place and a silver medal in 1993 behind Great Britain's Peter Haining. In 1994 he finished in twelfth place.

Hawkins was inducted into the Tasmanian Sporting Hall of Fame in 2003.
