= Simon Burgess =

Australian rower (born 1967)

Personal information
- Born: 11 September 1967 (age 58) Franklin, Tasmania
- Years active: 1987-2005

Sport
- Sport: Rowing
- Club: Franklin Rowing Club
Medal record
Men's rowing
Representing Australia
Olympic Games
| Silver medal – second place | 2000 Sydney | LM4- |
| Silver medal – second place | 2004 Athens | LM4- |
World Rowing Championships
| Gold medal – first place | 1991 Vienna | LM4x |
| Gold medal – first place | 1997 Aiguebelette | LM8+ |
| Silver medal – second place | 1999 St. Catharines | LM4- |
| Bronze medal – third place | 1990 Tasmania | LM4x |
| Bronze medal – third place | 1998 Cologne | LM4- |
Commonwealth Rowing Championships
| Gold medal – first place | 1994 Ontario | LM4X |

Simon Burgess (born 11 September 1967 in Franklin, Tasmania) is an Australian national champion, two-time World Champion, three-time Olympian and dual Olympic silver medal-winning lightweight rower. He represented Australia ten times at World Rowing Championships between 1990 and 2002. He won world and national championships in both sculls and in sweep-oared boat classes during an eighteen-year elite level career.

== Club and state rowing ==
An accomplished sculler and sweep oarsman, Burgess' senior rowing was with the Franklin Rowing Club in the small southern Tasmanian town of Geeveston.

Burgess began contesting national lightweight championship sculling titles at Australian Rowing Championships in 1987 representing the Franklin Rowing Club. He won his first national championship being the Australian lightweight single sculls title in 1990 . He rowed in the Tasmania representative men's lightweight four who contested the Penrith Cup at the Interstate Regatta on ten occasions between 1993 and 2005. He stroked that crew on seven occasions in those years and was a crew member in the seven consecutive Tasmanian wins from 1999 to 2005. He contested the heavyweight singles sculls championship - the President's Cup - representing Tasmania in 1995.

== International representative rowing ==
=== World Championships ===
Burgess was first selected to represent Australia in his "home" world championships at Lake Barrington 1990. The Australian quad scull contained two Tasmanian locals in Burgess and Stephen Hawkins and was coached by Tim McLaren and John Driessen, also Tasmanians. Hawkins stroked the crew (with Burgess at bow) to a bronze medal. The following year at Vienna 1991 that same crew (with Gary Lynagh and Bruce Hick at two and three) won gold and a World Championship title. They rowed through the field and won by 0.23 seconds.

In 1992 Stephen Hawkins was selected in the Olympic heavyweight double scull and so the champion lightweight quad was broken up. At the 1992 lightweight World Championships Lynagh and Hick had success as a double while Burgess raced the lightweight single scull championship for a fifth place.

For Roudnice 1993 and Indianapolis 1994 Burgess was back in the Australian lightweight quad scull and he stroked both those crews to a seventh place in 1993 and fifth place in 1994.

Burgess did not make Australian representative sculling crews in 1995 or 1996 due to illness, but by 1997 he was performing and selected at the elite level in lightweight sweep oared boats. For Aiguebelette 1997 he was picked in the six seat of the Australian lightweight eight who won gold, earning Burgess his second World Championship title. For Cologne 1998 and then at St Catharine's 1999 Burgess rowed in the Australian coxless four. The same four took bronze in 1998 and silver, with Burgess at stroke in 1999.

Burgess' final World Championship appearances were in the build up to the 2004 Summer Olympics. He was again selected in the coxless four who competed at Seville 2002 (4th place) and Milan 2003 (7th place).

=== Olympics ===
Atlanta 1996 saw lightweight events introduced to the Olympic regatta for the first time. Burgess was selected with his longstanding sculling partner Gary Lynagh in the lightweight coxless four along with Haimish Karrasch and David Belcher. They made the Olympic final and placed sixth.

For Sydney 2000 Burgess was again selected in the lightweight coxless four. The event showcased two match races between the Australians and the French crew. They met in a semi-final where the Australians (with Burgess in the bow seat) pipped the French by 3/100ths of a second. In the final the Australians led for much of the race. The French tried once to break through and failed, then a second time and failed and finally with a matter of metres to go broke through to win by less than half a second. Both races were superb and a highlight of the regatta.

At Athens 2004 Burgess made his third and final Olympic appearance in the Australian lightweight coxless four, this time as stroke. Anthony Edwards in the two seat was also at his third Olympics and both were still looking for their first Olympic gold medal. The Danish crew however were favourites and they got away in the 1st 500m. Burgess brought the Australian crew back into contention in the second and third 500 metres. However the Danes still had something in reserve in the rush home extending their lead to 1.4 seconds at the finish. This would be Burgess' last international representative appearance and the end of a seventeen-year rowing career at the elite level.

== Rowing palmares ==
=== Olympics ===
- 1996 Atlanta Olympics LM4- stroke - sixth
- 2000 Sydney Olympics LM4- bow - silver
- 2004 Athens Olympics LM4- stroke - silver

=== World Championships ===
- 1990 Tasmania LM4x bow - bronze
- 1991 Vienna LM4x bow - gold
- 1992 Montreal LM1x - fifth
- 1993 Roudnice LM4x stroke - seventh
- 1994 Indianapolis LM4x stroke - fifth
- 1997 Aiguebelette LM8+ six seat - gold
- 1998 Cologne LM4- two seat - bronze
- 1999 St. Catharines LM4- stroke - silver
- 2002 Seville LM4- bow - fourth
- 2003 Milan LM4- stroke - seventh

=== National Interstate Regatta ===
- 1993 Interstate men's LM4- (TAS) stroke - second
- 1994 Interstate men's LM4- (TAS) stroke - third
- 1995 Interstate men's single scull (TAS) - fifth
- 1998 Interstate men's LM4- (TAS) stroke - third
- 1999 Interstate men's LM4- (TAS) stroke - first
- 2000 Interstate men's LM4- (TAS) stroke - first
- 2001 Interstate men's LM4- (TAS) three seat - first
- 2002 Interstate men's LM4- (TAS) stroke - first
- 2003 Interstate men's LM4- (TAS) stroke - first
- 2004 Interstate men's LM4- (TAS) bow - first
- 2005 Interstate men's LM4- (TAS) stroke - first
