= Scott Muller =

Scott Muller may refer to:

- Scott Muller (cricketer) (born 1971), Australian cricketer
- Scott Muller (canoeist) (born 1970), Panamanian-American slalom canoer
