= Derek Holland (disambiguation) =

Derek Holland (born 1986), is an American baseball player.

Derek Holland may also refer to:

- Derek Holland (activist), a figure on the European far-right
- Derek Holland (rower) (born 1974), Irish rower
