= Canoeing at the 1992 Summer Olympics – Men's slalom K-1 =

These are the results of the men's K-1 slalom competition in canoeing at the 1992 Summer Olympics. The K-1 (kayak single) event is raced by one-man kayaks through a whitewater course. The venue for the 1992 Olympic competition was at La Seu d'Urgell.

== Medalists ==
| Gold | Silver | Bronze |
| Pierpaolo Ferrazzi (ITA) | Sylvain Curinier (FRA) | Jochen Lettmann (GER) |

== Results ==
The 44 competitors each took two runs through the whitewater slalom course on August 2. The best result of the runs counted for the event.

| Rank | Name | Run 1 | | | Run 2 | | | Result |
| Rank | Name | Time | Points | Total | Time | Points | Total | Total |
|---|---|---|---|---|---|---|---|---|
| Gold | Pierpaolo Ferrazzi (ITA) | 1:51.64 | 5 | 116.64 | 1:46.89 | 0 | 106.89 | 106.89 |
| Silver | Sylvain Curinier (FRA) | 2:08.09 | 5 | 133.09 | 1:47.06 | 0 | 107.06 | 107.06 |
| Bronze | Jochen Lettmann (GER) | 1:48.52 | 0 | 108.52 | 1:49.72 | 0 | 109.72 | 108.52 |
| 4 | Richard Fox (GBR) | 1:44.73 | 15 | 119.73 | 1:48.85 | 0 | 108.85 | 108.85 |
| 5 | Laurent Brissaud (FRA) | 1:49.37 | 0 | 109.37 | 1:53.02 | 10 | 123.02 | 109.37 |
| 6 | Marjan Štrukelj (SLO) | 1:50.11 | 0 | 110.11 | 1:51.75 | 20 | 131.75 | 110.11 |
| 7 | Melvyn Jones (GBR) | 1:50.40 | 0 | 110.40 | 1:55.70 | 15 | 130.70 | 110.40 |
| 8 | Ian Wiley (IRL) | 1:50.45 | 0 | 110.45 | 1:48.93 | 15 | 123.93 | 110.45 |
| 9 | Albin Čižman (SLO) | 1:52.12 | 0 | 112.12 | 1:50.73 | 0 | 110.73 | 110.73 |
| 10 | Janez Skok (SLO) | 1:52.00 | 0 | 112.00 | 1:51.52 | 0 | 111.52 | 111.52 |
| 11 | Michael Reys (NED) | 1:51.90 | 0 | 111.90 | 1:54.73 | 110 | 224.73 | 111.90 |
| 12 | Horst Pock (AUT) | 1:52.22 | 0 | 112.22 | 1:54.41 | 0 | 114.41 | 112.22 |
| 13 | Eric Jackson (USA) | 1:52.59 | 0 | 112.59 | 1:52.04 | 5 | 117.04 | 112.59 |
| 14 | Vincent Fondeviole (FRA) | 1:47.69 | 5 | 112.69 | 2:00.19 | 165 | 285.19 | 112.69 |
| 15 | David Ford (CAN) | 1:52.70 | 0 | 112.70 | 1:50.32 | 5 | 115.32 | 112.70 |
| 16 | Richard Weiss (USA) | 1:49.29 | 5 | 114.29 | 1:48.12 | 5 | 113.12 | 113.12 |
| 17 | Manuel Köhler (AUT) | 1:53.68 | 0 | 113.68 | 1:52.06 | 5 | 117.06 | 113.68 |
| 18 | Thomas Brunold (SUI) | 1:54.99 | 10 | 124.99 | 1:54.69 | 0 | 114.69 | 114.69 |
| 19 | Frits Sins (NED) | 1:52.35 | 10 | 122.35 | 1:49.77 | 5 | 114.77 | 114.77 |
| 20 | Ian Raspin (GBR) | 1:51.91 | 5 | 116.91 | 1:50.52 | 5 | 115.52 | 115.52 |
| 21 | Patrice Gagnon (CAN) | 1:56.25 | 0 | 116.25 | 1:53.79 | 5 | 118.79 | 116.25 |
| 22 | Javier Etxaniz (ESP) | 1:59.54 | 55 | 174.54 | 1:56.47 | 0 | 116.47 | 116.47 |
| 23 | Luboš Hilgert (TCH) | 1:51.63 | 5 | 116.63 | 1:53.48 | 5 | 118.48 | 116.63 |
| 24 | Pavel Přindiš (TCH) | 1:52.60 | 5 | 117.60 | 1:54.99 | 5 | 119.99 | 117.60 |
| 25 | Donald Johnstone (NZL) | 1:50.71 | 10 | 120.71 | 1:52.73 | 5 | 117.73 | 117.73 |
| 26 | Thomas Becker (GER) | 1:54.38 | 5 | 119.38 | 1:50.63 | 10 | 120.63 | 119.38 |
| 27 | Scott Shipley (USA) | 1:49.64 | 10 | 119.64 | 1:55.98 | 5 | 120.98 | 119.64 |
| 28 | Tsuyoshi Fujino (JPN) | 2:08.92 | 0 | 128.92 | 1:59.95 | 0 | 119.95 | 119.95 |
| 29 | Jens Vorsatz (GER) | 2:00.51 | 0 | 120.51 | 1:54.37 | 10 | 124.37 | 120.51 |
| 30 | Marlon Grings (BRA) | 2:00.86 | 5 | 125.86 | 2:00.82 | 0 | 120.82 | 120.82 |
| 31 | Gustavo Selbach (BRA) | 1:57.14 | 5 | 122.14 | 1:57.09 | 10 | 127.09 | 122.14 |
| 32 | Ralph Rhein (SUI) | 1:58.05 | 5 | 123.05 | 1:57.27 | 20 | 137.27 | 123.05 |
| 33 | Gregor Becke (AUT) | 1:58.65 | 15 | 133.65 | 1:53.62 | 10 | 123.62 | 123.62 |
| 34 | Lazar Popovski (IOP) | 2:03.82 | 0 | 123.82 | 2:05.72 | 10 | 135.72 | 123.82 |
| 35 | José María Martínez (ESP) | 1:55.15 | 15 | 130.15 | 1:54.69 | 10 | 124.69 | 124.69 |
| 36 | Alexander Rennie (RSA) | 2:06.79 | 0 | 126.79 | 2:13.12 | 65 | 198.12 | 126.79 |
| 37 | Juan Maricich (ARG) | 2:10.05 | 10 | 140.05 | 2:23.67 | 55 | 198.67 | 140.05 |
| 38 | Corran Addison (RSA) | 2:12.63 | 25 | 157.63 | 2:10.71 | 20 | 150.71 | 150.71 |
| 39 | Milan Đorđević (IOP) | Did not finish | N/A | 10 | 2:26.28 | 10 | 156.28 | 156.28 |
| 40 | Gary Wade (RSA) | 2:20.61 | 130 | 270.61 | 2:22.93 | 20 | 162.93 | 162.93 |
| 41 | Joaquín García Benavides (CRC) | 3:19.23 | 105 | 304.23 | 2:34.14 | 15 | 169.14 | 169.14 |
| 42 | Eric Arenas (PER) | 2:50.02 | 0 | 170.02 | 2:59.52 | 75 | 254.52 | 170.02 |
| 43 | Ferdinand Steinvorth (CRC) | 2:29.07 | 120 | 269.07 | 2:26.11 | 45 | 191.11 | 191.11 |
| 44 | Gabriel Álvarez (CRC) | 3:08.87 | 270 | 458.87 | 2:51.02 | 130 | 301.02 | 301.02 |
