= Gary Wade =

Gary Wade may refer to:

- Gary Wade (canoeist) (born 1970), South African canoeist
- Gary R. Wade (born 1946), American jurist
