= Maricich =

Maricich is a surname. Notable people with the surname include:

- Juan Maricich (born 1972), Argentine slalom canoeist
- Maria Maricich (born 1961), American alpine skier
