= Feusi =

Surname list

Feusi is the surname of the following people

- Arnold Feusi (1912-1998), Canadian provincial politician
- Markus Feusi (born in 1968), Swiss rower
- Martina Feusi (born in 1974), Swiss bobsledder

== See also ==
- Patrice Feussi (born in 1986), Cameroonian footballer
