= Gabriel Álvarez =

Costa Rican canoeist

Gabriel Álvarez Saborio (born May 3, 1969) is a Costa Rican slalom canoer.

== Career ==
Álavarez competed in the early 1990s. He finished 43rd in the K-1 event at the 1992 Summer Olympics in Barcelona.
