= Miroslav Stanovský =

Slovak born Latvian slalom canoeist (born 1970)

Personal information
- Nationality: Slovak
- Born: 18 October 1970 (age 55) Ružomberok, Czechoslovakia
- Height: 1.75 m (5 ft 9 in)
- Weight: 68 kg (150 lb)

Sport
- Country: Slovakia, Latvia
- Sport: Canoe slalom
- Event: K1
Medal record
Men's canoe slalom
Representing Slovakia
European Championships
Silver medal – second place	1996 Augsburg	K1

Miroslav Stanovský (born 18 October 1970 in Ružomberok, Czechoslovakia) is a retired Slovak slalom canoeist who competed at the international level from 1988 to 2013, specializing in the K1 discipline.

He represented Czechoslovakia at the 1988 World Junior Canoe Slalom Championships. At the senior level he represented Slovakia from 1993 to 2000 and then Latvia from 2007 to 2013.

He competed in the K1 event at the 1996 Summer Olympics in Atlanta, where he finished in 10th position. He is the first Slovak paddler to win an individual medal in the men's K1 category with a silver at the inaugural 1996 European Canoe Slalom Championships in Augsburg.

As of 2023 he is coaching his daughter Soňa Stanovská.

== Major championships results timeline ==
=== Representing Slovakia ===
Event		1993	1994	1995	1996	1997	1998	1999	2000
Olympic Games	K1	Not held			10	Not held			—
World Championships	K1	29	Not held	23	Not held	24	Not held	32	Not held
World Championships	K1 team	10	Not held	8	Not held	6	Not held	4	Not held
European Championships	K1	Not held			2	Not held	16	Not held	28
European Championships	K1 team	Not held			4	Not held	5	Not held	—

=== Representing Latvia ===
Event		2007	2008	2009	2010	2011	2012	2013
World Championships	K1	—	Not held	DNS	DNS	60	Not held	—
World Championships	K1 team	—	Not held	—	—	13	Not held	—
European Championships	K1	41	28	—	35	—	52	51
European Championships	K1 team	—	16	—	—	—	—	13
