= David Collins (rower) =

American rower (born 1969)

Personal information
- Born: October 12, 1969 (age 56) Thousand Oaks, California, U.S.
- Height: 6 ft 0 in (183 cm)
- Weight: 154 lb (70 kg)
Medal record
Men's rowing
Representing the United States
Olympic Games
Bronze medal – third place	1996 Atlanta	Lwt coxless four
World Rowing Championships
Bronze medal – third place	1991 Vienna	Lwt eight
Pan American Games
Gold medal – first place	1995 Mar del Plata	Lwt eight

David Collins (born October 12, 1969) is an American rower and Olympic bronze medalist. He was born in Thousand Oaks, California. A seven-time national rowing champion, Dave won a bronze medal at the 1996 Olympics as a member of the U.S. rowing team. Dave also received a gold medal at the 1995 Pan American Games and a bronze medal at the 1991 World Rowing Championships. Dave was inducted into the United States National Rowing Hall of Fame and Rutgers University's Olympic Hall of Fame. He graduated with honors from Rutgers College of Engineering and completed his graduate degree in secondary education at Old Dominion University's Darden College of Education.

In addition to teaching mathematics in public high schools, Dave has worked for the North Carolina Department of Education evaluating and authoring future state assessments. He also wrote a research paper to aid new teachers with peer relations within a multicultural classroom as part of a U.S. Department of Education study. Dave is a member of VAIS's Professional Development Advisory Commission. He has also coached both high school and college crew, including the Rutgers and Georgetown University teams.
