= Ralph Rhein =

Swiss slalom canoer (born 1965)

Ralph Rhein (born 31 January 1965) is a Swiss slalom canoeist who competed from the mid-1980s to the mid-1990s. He finished 32nd in the K-1 event at the 1992 Summer Olympics in Barcelona.
