= Harald Hofmann =

Austrian rower

Personal information
- Nationality: Austrian
- Born: 18 July 1973 (age 52) Linz, Austria

Sport
- Sport: Rowing

Harald Hofmann (born 18 July 1973) is an Austrian rower. He competed in the men's lightweight coxless four event at the 1996 Summer Olympics.
