= Stéphane Guérinot =

French rower

Stéphane Guerinot
Personal information
- Full name: Stéphane Hugues Guérinot
- Nationality: French
- Born: 17 July 1968 (age 58) Lyon, France

Sport
- Sport: Rowing
Medal record
Representing France
World Championships
Silver medal – second place	1990 Tasmania	Lwt coxless fours
Silver medal – second place	1991 Vienna	Lwt eights
Bronze medal – third place	1992 Montreal	Lwt coxless fours
Summer Universiade
Silver medal – second place	1993 Buffalo	Coxed fours

Stéphane Hugues Guerinot (born 17 July 1968) is a French rower. He competed in the men's lightweight coxless four event at the 1996 Summer Olympics.
