= David Morales (rower) =

Spanish rower

Personal information
- Full name: David Morales Paz
- Nationality: Spanish
- Born: 10 February 1977 (age 48); Tortosa, Spain

Sport
- Sport: Rowing

David Morales Paz (born 10 February 1977) is a Spanish rower. He competed in the men's lightweight coxless four event at the 1996 Summer Olympics.
