= Valter Molea =

Italian rower

Personal information
- Born: 8 July 1966 (age 60) Naples, Italy

Sport
- Sport: Rowing
Medal record
Representing Italy
Olympic Games
Silver medal – second place	2000 Sydney	Coxless four
World Rowing Championships
Gold medal – first place	1994 Indianapolis	M4-
Gold medal – first place	1995 Tampere	M4-
Bronze medal – third place	1998 Cologne	M4-
Bronze medal – third place	1999 St. Catharines	M4-
Summer Universiade
Gold medal – first place	1987 Zagreb	Eight
Mediterranean Games
Silver medal – second place	1993 Languedoc	Coxless four
Silver medal – second place	1997 Bari	Coxless four

Valter Molea (born 8 July 1966) is an Italian rower. He competed at four Olympic Games and won a silver medal at the 2000 Summer Olympics.
