= Marc Schneider (rower) =

American rower (born 1973)

Personal information
- Full name: Marcus Blake Schneider
- Born: April 28, 1973 (age 53) Lubbock, Texas, U.S.
Medal record
Men's rowing
Representing the United States
Olympic Games
Bronze medal – third place	1996 Atlanta	Lwt coxless four
Pan American Games
Gold medal – first place	1999 Winnipeg	Lwt coxless four

Marcus Blake Schneider (born April 28, 1973) is an American former rower for the University of Washington. He competed in the 1996 Atlanta Olympic Games as well as the 2000 Sydney Olympic games. He won a bronze medal in 1996, and finished 6th in 2000. He attended Cascade High School in Everett, Washington.
