= Hernán Legizamón =

Argentine rower

Personal information
- Full name: Hernán Dario Leguizamón
- Born: 30 October 1969 (age 56) Tigre, Buenos Aires, Argentina

Sport
- Sport: Rowing
Medal record
Representing Argentina
Pan American Games
Silver medal – second place	1995 Mar del Plata	Lightweight eights

Hernán Dario Legizamón (born 30 October 1969) is an Argentine rower. He competed in the men's lightweight coxless four event at the 1996 Summer Olympics.
