= Richard MacQuire =

Australian slalom canoeist (born 1972)

Richard MacQuire (born 17 February 1972) is an Australian slalom canoeist who competed in the men's slalom K-1 event at the 1996 Summer Olympics.

== Early life and career ==
Richard MacQuire was born on 17 February 1972 in Melbourne. His mother's name is Lyn MacQuire. MacQuire is from North Warrandyte and resides on Bradleys Lane. He attended Warrandyte Primary School. MacQuire took up canoe slalom at the age of 12, when it was an "easy walk from the family home to the Yarra River".

Prior to the Olympics, MacQuire competed in the 1989, 1991, 1993 and 1995 ICF Canoe Slalom World Championships and the 1992, 1994 and 1995 Canoe Slalom World Cups. He was at one point the Australian men's No.1 canoeist and national champion.

== 1996 Summer Olympics ==
At the 1996 Summer Olympics, MacQuire finished 24th in the men's slalom K-1 event with a final result of 153.07.
