= Michael Bänninger =

Swiss rower

Personal information
- Nationality: Swiss
- Born: 30 November 1971 (age 53)

Sport
- Sport: Rowing

Michael Bänninger (born 30 November 1971) is a Swiss rower. He competed in the men's lightweight coxless four event at the 1996 Summer Olympics.
