= Marlon Grings =

Brazilian slalom canoer (born 1976)

Marlon Almiro Grings (born July 16, 1976) is a Brazilian slalom canoer who competed in the early-to-mid 1990s. He finished 30th in the K-1 event at the 1992 Summer Olympics in Barcelona.
