= Henri-Pierre Dall'acqua =

French rower

Personal information
- Nationality: French
- Born: 1 December 1972 (age 52); Toulouse, France

Sport
- Sport: Rowing

Henri-Pierre Dall'acqua (born 1 December 1972) is a French rower. He competed in the men's lightweight coxless four event at the 1996 Summer Olympics.
