= Jim McNiven =

British rower

Personal information
- Born: James McNiven; 3 June 1965 (age 61)

Sport
- Sport: Rowing
Medal record
Men's rowing
Representing Great Britain
World Rowing Championships
Gold medal – first place	1994 Indianapolis	Lwt eight
Silver medal – second place	1992 Montreal	Lwt eight
Silver medal – second place	1995 Tampere	Lwt eight
Silver medal – second place	1997 Aiguebelette	Lwt eight
Silver medal – second place	2000 Zagreb	Lwt eight

James McNiven (born 3 June 1965) is a British lightweight rower. He won a gold medal at the 1994 World Rowing Championships in Indianapolis with the lightweight men's eight. He also competed in the men's lightweight coxless four event at the 1996 Summer Olympics.
