= Jerzy Sandera =

Polish canoeist (born 1972)

Jerzy Sandera (born September 3, 1972 in Nowy Sącz) is a Polish slalom canoer who competed from the early 1990s to the early 2000s. He finished 27th in the K-1 event at the 1996 Summer Olympics in Atlanta.
