= Brian Peaker =

Canadian rower

Personal information
- Born: May 26, 1959 (age 67) London, Ontario
Medal record
Men's rowing
Representing Canada
Olympic Games
Silver medal – second place	1996 Atlanta	Lightweight coxless four

Brian Ronald Peaker (born May 26, 1959 in London, Ontario) is a retired rower from Canada. He won the silver medal at the 1996 Summer Olympics in the Men's Lightweight Coxless Fours, alongside Jeffrey Lay, Dave Boyes, and Gavin Hassett.
