= Patrice Gagnon =

Canadian canoeist (born 1963)

Patrice Gagnon (born May 12, 1963) is a Canadian slalom canoer who competed from the mid-1980s to the early 1990s. He finished 21st in the K-1 event at the 1992 Summer Olympics in Barcelona. Gagnon was born in Lévis, Quebec.
