= Dave Lemon =

British rower

Personal information
- Born: David Lemon; 14 June 1969 (age 57)

Sport
- Sport: Rowing
Medal record
Men's rowing
Representing Great Britain
World Rowing Championships
Gold medal – first place	1994 Indianapolis	Lwt eight
Silver medal – second place	1995 Tampere	Lwt eight
Silver medal – second place	1997 Aiguebelette	Lwt eight

David Lemon (born 14 June 1969) is a British lightweight rower. He won a gold medal at the 1994 World Rowing Championships in Indianapolis with the lightweight men's eight. He also competed in the men's lightweight coxless four event at the 1996 Summer Olympics.
