= Vladimir Mityushov =

Russian rower

Personal information
- Full name: Vladimir Petrovich Mityushov
- Nationality: Russian
- Born: 17 October 1960 (age 64); Orenburg, Russia

Sport
- Sport: Rowing

Vladimir Petrovich Mityushov (Russian: Владимир Петрович Митюшев; born 17 October 1960) is a Russian rower. He competed in the men's lightweight coxless four event at the 1996 Summer Olympics.
