= Michelangelo Crispi =

Italian rower

Personal information
- Born: 5 February 1972 (age 54) Catania

Sport
- Sport: Rowing
- Club: G.S. Fiamme Gialle
Medal record
Men's rowing
Representing Italy
World Rowing Championships
Gold medal – first place	1992 Montreal	Lwt quad scull
Gold medal – first place	1994 Indianapolis	Lwt double scull
Gold medal – first place	1999 St. Catharines	Lwt double scull
Silver medal – second place	1993 Račice	Lwt quad scull
Silver medal – second place	1997 Aiguebelette	Lwt double scull
Silver medal – second place	1998 Cologne	Lwt double scull
Mediterranean Games
Gold medal – first place	Bari 1997	Lwt double scull

Michelangelo Crispi (born 5 February 1972 in Catania) is an Italian lightweight rower. He won a gold medal at the 1994 World Rowing Championships in Indianapolis with the lightweight men's double scull.
