= Alexander Rennie =

South African canoeist

Alexander Grant Rennie (28 September 1959 – 4 December 2013) was a South African slalom canoer who competed in the early 1990s. He finished 36th in the K-1 event at the 1992 Summer Olympics in Barcelona. Rennie died in a plane crash in 2013.
