= Tobias Rose =

German rower

Personal information
- Nationality: German
- Born: 29 June 1974 (age 50); Hamburg, West Germany

Sport
- Sport: Rowing

Tobias Rose (born 29 June 1974) is a German rower. He competed in the men's lightweight coxless four event at the 1996 Summer Olympics.
