= Gavin Hassett =

Canadian rower

Personal information
- Born: July 13, 1973 (age 53) Saint John, New Brunswick, Canada

Sport
- Sport: Rowing
Medal record
Representing Canada
Olympic Games
Silver medal – second place	1996 Atlanta	Lwt coxless four
World Championships
Gold medal – first place	1993 Racice	Lwt eight
Bronze medal – third place	2002 Seville	Lwt coxless four
Summer Universiade
Bronze medal – third place	1993 Buffalo	Lwt coxless four

Gavin Hassett (born July 13, 1973) is a Canadian rower. He began rowing in 1989. A three time Olympian, he won the silver medal at the 1996 Summer Olympics in the Men's Lightweight Coxless Fours event, alongside Jeffrey Lay, Dave Boyes and Brian Peaker. He also claimed a bronze medal at the 2002 World Rowing Championships in Seville, Spain in the same event.
