= Bernhard Stomporowski =

German rower

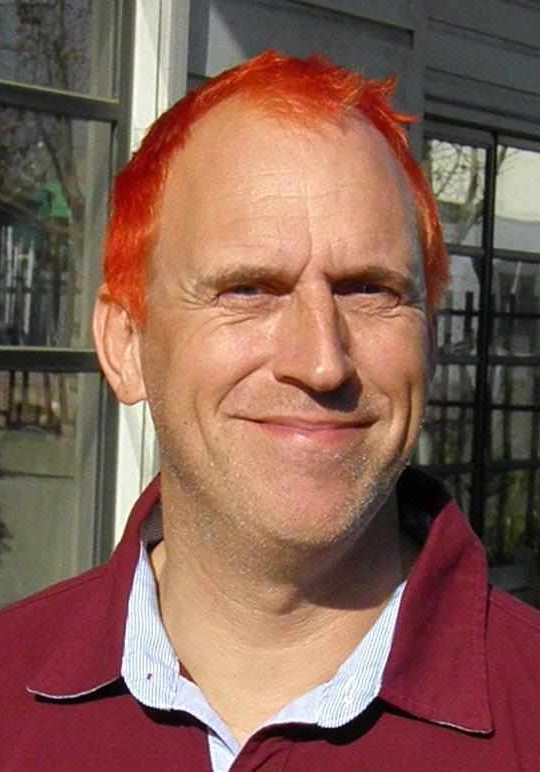
- Stomporowski in 2017

Personal information
- Born: 19 May 1966 (age 60) Braunschweig, West Germany
- Height: 186 cm (6 ft 1 in)
- Weight: 71 kg (157 lb)

Sport
- Sport: Rowing
Medal record
Men's rowing
World Championships
Representing West Germany
Silver medal – second place	1987 Copenhagen	LM8+
Gold medal – first place	1989 Bled	LM4-
Gold medal – first place	1990 Tasmania	LM4-
Representing Germany
Bronze medal – third place	1992 Montreal	LM8+
Bronze medal – third place	1994 Indianapolis	LM4-
Bronze medal – third place	1995 Tampere	LM4-
Gold medal – first place	1998 Cologne	LM8+

Bernhard Stomporowski (born 19 May 1966) is a retired German lightweight rower. He is a triple world champion.

Stomporowski was born in 1966 in Braunschweig, West Germany. He started rowing in 1982. He first competed internationally at the 1987 World Rowing Championships in Copenhagen, Denmark, where he won a silver medal with the lightweight eight. He was world champion with the lightweight four in 1989 and 1990. He competed in the lightweight men's four at the 1996 Summer Olympics in the United States where his team came fifth.

He studied rowing at the Trainerakademie in Cologne. On 20 December 1999, he married fellow international rower Katrin Rutschow. They lived in Switzerland until 2007, where they worked as rowing trainers. They divorced in 2010. In 2011, he was head coach of the California Rowing Club (CRC), and Kathleen Bertko and Kristin Hedstrom from his club won silver at the 2013 World Rowing Championships. While coaching for CRC, he lived in Alameda, California.
