= Jeffrey Lay =

Canadian rower

Personal information
- Born: October 6, 1969 (age 56) Ottawa, Canada
Medal record
Men's rowing
Representing Canada
Olympic Games
Silver medal – second place	1996 Atlanta	Lightweight coxless four
World Rowing Championships
Gold medal – first place	1993 Racice	Eights
Bronze medal – third place	1997 Aiguebelette-le-Lac	Eights
Pan American Games
Silver medal – second place	1995 Mar del Plata	Lightweight pairs
Silver medal – second place	1995 Mar del Plata	Lightweight coxless fours

Jeffrey Donald Lay (born October 6, 1969) is a retired rower from Canada. He won the silver medal at the 1996 Summer Olympics in the Men's Lightweight Coxless Fours, alongside Brian Peaker, Dave Boyes, and Gavin Hassett.
