= Charlotte Hollings =

American rower

Medal record

Women's rowing

Representing the United States

World Championships
Silver medal – second place	1985 Hazewinkel	LW4-
Gold medal – first place	1994 Indianapolis	LW4-

Charlotte Hollings is an American rower. In the 1994 World Rowing Championships she won a gold medal in the women's lightweight coxless four event.
