= Michael Reys =

Dutch slalom canoer (born 1966)

Michael Reys (born 17 February 1966 in Ratingen, West Germany) is a Dutch slalom canoer who competed from the late 1980s to the mid-1990s. He finished 11th in the K-1 event at both the 1992 and the 1996 Summer Olympics.
