= Katsuhiko Nakamizo =

Japanese rower (born 1966)

Personal information
- Nationality: Japanese
- Born: 5 March 1966 (age 60) Gunma, Japan

Sport
- Sport: Rowing

Katsuhiko Nakamizo (Japanese: 中溝 勝彦; born 5 March 1966) is a Japanese rower. He competed in the men's lightweight coxless four event at the 1996 Summer Olympics.
