= Jorge Enríquez (rower) =

Argentine rower

Personal information
- Full name: Jorge Alberto Enríquez
- Nationality: Argentine
- Born: 16 April 1972 (age 53)

Sport
- Sport: Rowing

Jorge Alberto Enríquez (born 16 April 1972) is an Argentine rower. He competed in the men's lightweight coxless four event at the 1996 Summer Olympics.
