= Jens Vorsatz =

German slalom canoer (born 1971)

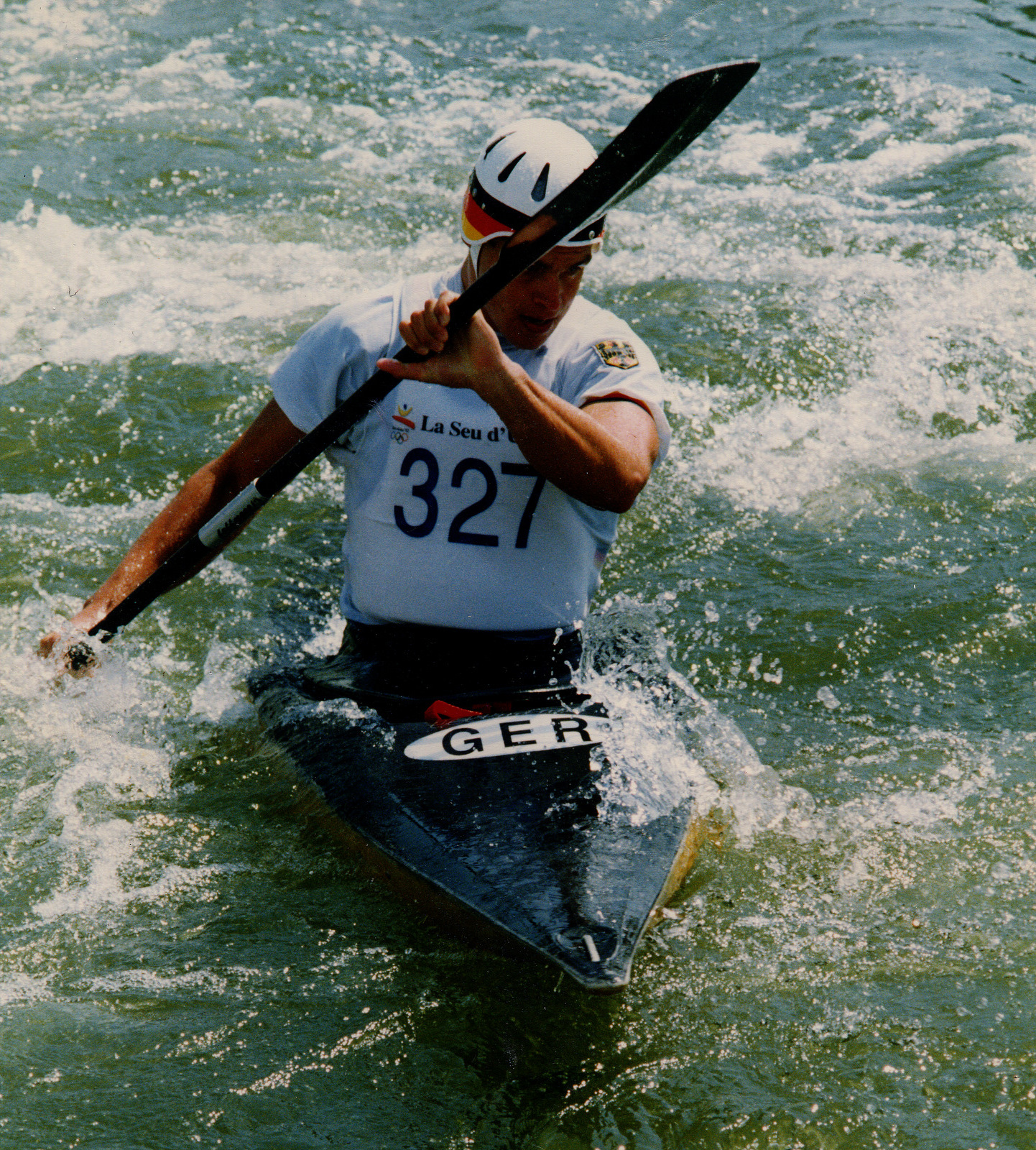
Jens Vorsatz in action

Jens Vorsatz (born 13 January 1971 in Schwerte) is a German slalom canoer who competed in the early-to-mid 1990s. He finished 29th in the K-1 event at the 1992 Summer Olympics in Barcelona.
