= Javier Etxaniz =

Spanish canoeist

Javier Etxaniz Peña (born April 11, 1970, in San Sebastián) is a Basque slalom canoer who competed in the early to mid-1990s. He finished 22nd in the K-1 event both at the 1992 and the 1996 Summer Olympics.
