= Milan Đorđević =

Serbian slalom canoer (born 1968)

Milan Đorđević (Serbian: Милан Ђорђевић; born 5 November 1968) is a Serbian slalom canoeist who competed as an Independent Olympic Participant in the early 1990s. He finished 39th in the K-1 event at the 1992 Summer Olympics in Barcelona.
