= Niels Henriksen =

Danish rower

Personal information
- Born: Niels Laulund Henriksen; 4 February 1966 (age 60) Gentofte, Denmark

Sport
- Sport: Rowing
Medal record
Men's rowing
Representing Denmark
Olympic Games
Gold medal – first place	1996 Atlanta	Lwt coxless four
World Championships
Gold medal – first place	1994 Indianapolis	Lwt coxless four
Silver medal – second place	1989 Bled	Lwt eight
Silver medal – second place	1993 Račice	Lwt eight
Silver medal – second place	1995 Tampere	Lwt coxless four

Niels Laulund Henriksen (born 4 February 1966) is a Danish competition rower and Olympic champion.

Henriksen won a gold medal in lightweight coxless four at the 1996 Summer Olympics. At world championships, he won one gold and three silver medals between 1989 and 1995.
