= Ferdinand Steinvorth =

Costa Rican slalom canoer (born 1973)

Ferdinand Steinvorth Neverman (born June 16, 1973) is a Costa Rican former slalom canoer who competed in the early-to-mid 1990s. He finished 43rd in the K-1 event at the 1992 Summer Olympics in Barcelona.
