= Joaquín García Benavides =

Costa Rican canoeist (born 1962)

Joaquín García Benavides (born June 5, 1962) is a retired Costa Rican slalom canoer who competed in the early 1990s. He finished 41st in the K-1 event at the 1992 Summer Olympics in Barcelona.
