= Samir Karabašić =

Bosnian slalom canoer (1966–2026)

Samir Karabašić (12 December 1966 – 7 March 2026) was a Bosnian slalom canoer who competed in the mid-1990s. He finished 41st in the K-1 event at the 1996 Summer Olympics in Atlanta. Karabašić died on 7 March 2026, at the age of 59.

== Sources ==
- Sports-Reference.com Profile
