= Nicolai Kern =

Swiss rower (born 1968)

Personal information
- Nationality: Swiss
- Born: 12 October 1968 (age 56); Nebikon, Switzerland

Sport
- Sport: Rowing

Nicolai Kern (born 12 October 1968) is a Swiss former rower. He competed in the men's lightweight coxless four event at the 1996 Summer Olympics.
