= Owen Hughes (canoeist) =

New Zealand canoeist (born 1971)

Owen Lance Hughes (born 6 July 1971 in Palmerston North) is a New Zealand slalom canoer who competed from the late 1980s to the mid-1990s. He finished 31st in the K-1 event at the 1996 Summer Olympics in Atlanta.
