= Aleksandr Ustinov =

Russian rower

Personal information
- Full name: Aleksandr Viktorovich Ustinov
- Nationality: Russian
- Born: 26 January 1968; Kazan, Russia
- Died: 1996 (aged 27–28); Kazan, Russia

Sport
- Sport: Rowing

Aleksandr Viktorovich Ustinov (Russian: Александр Викторович Устинов; 26 January 1968 – 16 December 1996) was a Russian rower. He competed in the men's lightweight coxless four event at the 1996 Summer Olympics. He died in a car crash in his home city Kazan not long after his Olympic appearance.
