= Benjamin Helm (rower) =

British rower (born 1964)

Ben Helm
Personal information
- Born: 8 May 1964 (age 61) London, England

Sport
- Country: United Kingdom
- Sport: Rowing

Ben Helm (born 8 May 1964) is a British rower. He competed in the men's lightweight coxless four event at the 1996 Summer Olympics. Ben won a silver medal in lightweight eights at the 1995 World Rowing Championships.

Helm is Chair of the Head of the River Race and is the Chair of the Race Committee (chief umpire) for the Head of the River Race, the Schools' Head of the River Race, and the Metropolitan Regatta. He is also a Steward of Henley Royal Regatta.
