= Dave Boyes =

Canadian rower

Personal information
- Born: August 26, 1964 (age 61) St. Catharines, Ontario
Medal record
Men's rowing
Representing Canada
Olympic Games
Silver medal – second place	1996 Atlanta	Lightweight coxless four

David Michael Boyes (born August 26, 1964) is a retired rower from Canada. He won the silver medal at the 1996 Summer Olympics in the Men's Lightweight Coxless Fours, alongside Brian Peaker, Jeffrey Lay, and Gavin Hassett. Boyes was born in St. Catharines, Ontario, and is currently a captain in the St. Catharines Fire Department.
