= David Belcher =

Australian rower

Personal information
- Full name: David Alexander Belcher
- Nationality: Australian
- Born: 6 January 1967 (age 58); Penola, South Australia

Sport
- Sport: Rowing

David Alexander Belcher (born 6 January 1967) is an Australian rower. He competed in the men's lightweight coxless four event at the 1996 Summer Olympics.
