= Gregor Becke =

Austrian slalom canoer (born 1972)

Gregor Becke (born 12 October 1972 in Salzburg) is an Austrian slalom canoer who competed from the late 1980s to the early 1990s. He finished 33rd in the K-1 event at the 1992 Summer Olympics in Barcelona.
