= Thomas Brunold =

Swiss slalom canoer & chemist

Thomas Brunold (born 6 March 1969) is a Swiss slalom canoeist who competed from the mid-1980s to the mid-1990s. He finished 18th in the K-1 event at the 1992 Summer Olympics in Barcelona. He is currently a Chemistry professor at the University of Wisconsin–Madison. Placed first in his age division at the Ironman Wisconsin race in 2012, 2013, and 2014.
