= Gareth Costa =

South African rower

Personal information
- Nationality: South African
- Born: 23 November 1964 (age 60); Johannesburg, South Africa

Sport
- Sport: Rowing

Gareth Costa (born 23 November 1964) is a South African rower. He competed in the men's lightweight coxless four event at the 1996 Summer Olympics.
