= Stéphane Barré =

French rower

Personal information
- Full name: Stéphane Georges Barré
- Nationality: French
- Born: 23 January 1970 (age 55); Rouen, France

Sport
- Sport: Rowing

Stéphane Georges Barré (born 23 January 1970) is a French rower. He competed in the men's lightweight coxless four event at the 1996 Summer Olympics, where they reached the semi-finals before failing to qualify to the finals. Via the B final they ultimately were ranked 7th.
