= Jeff Pfaendtner =

American rower

Personal information
- Full name: Jeffrey A. Pfaendtner
- Born: February 28, 1967 (age 59) Detroit, Michigan, U.S.
- Education: University of Pennsylvania
Medal record
Men's rowing
Representing United States
Olympic Games
Bronze medal – third place	1996 Atlanta	Lwt coxless four
World Rowing Championships
Silver medal – second place	1988 Milan	Lwt eight

Jeffrey A. Pfaendtner (born February 28, 1967) is an American rower and Olympic bronze medalist. He won the bronze medal in men's lightweight coxless four at the 1996 Summer Games in Atlanta. Pfaendtner is a graduate of the University of Pennsylvania.

== Personal life ==
In 2018, Pfaendtner married Tammy Dickinson. He has three children- Olivia, Helene and Lucas and currently lives in Minnesota.
