= Andrew Boland =

Irish slalom canoer (born 1972)

Andrew Boland (born March 30, 1972, in Leixlip) is an Irish slalom canoer who competed in the mid-1990s. He finished 40th in the K-1 event at the 1996 Summer Olympics in Atlanta.
