= Sal Ayob =

Malaysian slalom canoer (born 1964)

Salehuddin "Sal" Ayob (born 22 November 1964) is a Malaysian slalom canoer who competed in the mid-to-late 1990s. He finished 43rd in the K-1 event at the 1996 Summer Olympics in Atlanta.

His daughter, Aruwin Salehhuddin has qualified to represent Malaysia in alpine skiing at the 2022 Winter Olympics in Beijing.
