= Donald Johnstone (canoeist) =

New Zealand canoeist (born 1953)

Donald Brett Johnstone (born 17 September 1963 in Feilding) is a New Zealand slalom canoer who competed from the mid-1980s to the early 1990s. He finished 25th in the K-1 event at the 1992 Summer Olympics in Barcelona.
