= Gabriel Scortiquini =

Argentine rower

Personal information
- Full name: Gabriel Alejandro Scortiquini
- Nationality: Argentine
- Born: 7 December 1971 (age 54)

Sport
- Sport: Rowing
Medal record
Representing Argentina
Pan American Games
Silver medal – second place	1995 Mar del Plata	Lightweight eights

Gabriel Alejandro Scortiquini (born 7 December 1971) is an Argentine rower. He competed in the men's lightweight coxless four event at the 1996 Summer Olympics.
