= Eric Arenas =

Peruvian canoeist (born 1971)

Eric Arenas Centeno (born 3 June 1971) is a Peruvian slalom canoer who competed in the early 1990s. He finished 42nd in the K-1 event at the 1992 Summer Olympics in Barcelona.

Centeno was born in Cusco.
