= Scott Muller (canoeist) =

Scott A. Muller (born June 28, 1970 in Rochester, Minnesota) is a Panamanian-American who competed for Panama as a slalom canoer from 1995–2003. He finished 44th in the K-1 event at the 1996 Summer Olympics in Atlanta. In 2002 he won a bronze medal at the Pan American Slalom Kayak Championships on the Aconcagua river in Chile.

From 2007–2012, Muller was the Director for the Clinton Foundation- Clinton Climate Initiative and the C40 Cities Climate Leadership Group in Lima, Peru.
