= Mike Hasselbach =

South African rower (1969–2026)

Personal information
- Full name: Michael Hasselbach
- Nationality: South African
- Born: 29 June 1969
- Died: 21 September 2026 (aged 57) New Zealand

Sport
- Sport: Rowing

Michael Hasselbach (29 June 1969 – 21 September 2026) was a South African rower. He competed at the 1996 Summer Olympics and the 2000 Summer Olympics.

Hasselbach died in New Zealand on 21 September 2026, at the age of 57.
