= Haimish Karrasch =

Australian former rower (born 1976)

Personal information
- Nationality: Australian
- Born: 27 January 1976 (age 50)

Sport
- Country: Australia
- Sport: Rowing
- Club: Toowong Rowing Club
Medal record
Representing Australia
World Rowing Championships
Silver medal – second place	1999 St Catharines	LM2X
World Rowing U23 Championships
Silver medal – second place	1997 Milan	BLM1X
Junior World Rowing Championships
Bronze medal – third place	1994 Munich	JM2X

Haimish John Karrasch (born 27 January 1976) is an Australian former rower. He was a nine-time Queensland state representative, an eight-time Australian national champion, a dual Olympian and won a silver medal at the 1999 World Rowing Championships.

== Club and state rowing ==
Born in Brisbane Queensland, Karrasch's senior rowing was from the Toowong Rowing Club.

He made his first Queensland state appearance in the 1994 youth eight contesting the Noel Wilkinson Trophy at the Interstate Regatta within the Australian Rowing Championships. In 1996 he was selected in Queensland's lightweight four competing for the Penrith Cup at the Interstate Regatta. He raced in further Queensland lightweight fours in 1997, 1998, 1999, 2002, 2003 and 2004. He stroke those Queensland fours in 2003 and 2004. In 2000 Karrasch contested and won the President's Cup - the Interstate single sculls championship as the Queensland state representative.

In Toowong Rowing Club colours he contested the national lightweight sculling title at the Australian Rowing Championships on numerous occasions and he won that title in 1998, 1999, 2000, 2003 and 2004.

In 1996 in a composite Australian selection crew Karrasch won the national lightweight coxless four title at the Australian Championships. In 2003 Karrasch was a member of the Australian Institute of Sport's lightweight four that won the Australian championship at Lake Barrington.

== International representative rowing ==
Karrasch made his Australian representative debut at age eighteen the 1994 World Rowing U23 Championships in Paris in an Australian junior double scull which finished in twelfth place. A few weeks later in that same double with Martin Inglis he raced at the 1994 Junior World Rowing Championships in Munich and won a bronze medal.

At the 1995 World Rowing Championships in Tampere, Finland Karrasch was elevated to the senior squad when he rowed in the lightweight quad scull which finished in sixth place. For the 1996 Athens Olympics Karrasch moved into a sweep-oared boat when he rowed in the lightweight coxless four to sixth place in the Olympic final.

In 1997 still eligible for the World Rowing U23 Championships Karrasch was Australia's lightweight single-sculling representative in Milan. He rowed to a silver medal. In 1998 Karrasch held his position as Australia's lightweight single sculler and rowed at two World Rowing Cups in Europe and then at the 1998 World Rowing Championships in Cologne to fourth place. At St Catharine's 1999 Karrasch was paired up with Bruce Hick in the double scull. Karrasch was in the stroke seat for their heat win and they showed great form in the final into a tough headwind taking the silver medal behind the Italians.

In the 2000 Olympic year Karrasch was again paired with Bruce Hick in the lightweight double scull. They rowed at two World Rowing Cups in Europe with Karrasch at stroke. At Sydney 2000 with Hick setting the pace this time, they won their heat and looked comfortable in the semi-final until with 500 m to go they were unable to match the final sprint in a very tight race. They finished fourth and missed the final. They easily won the B final, placing seventh overall.

Following his second Olympics Karrasch continued to row at the highest international level in a lightweight double scull. In 2002 he competed at a World Rowing Cup and the 2002 Seville World Championships with Dan Stewart rowing to a sixth-place finish. Then in 2003 he competed at the World Rowing Cup in Lucerne and the 2003 Milan World Championships he finished in tenth place overall rowing with Anthony Edwards. It was his final Australian representative appearance.
