= Mark Rowand =

South African rower

Personal information
- Full name: Mark Raeside Rowand
- Nationality: South African
- Born: 10 February 1968 (age 57); Johannesburg, South Africa

Sport
- Sport: Rowing

Mark Raeside Rowand (born 10 February 1968) is a South African rower. He competed at the 1996 Summer Olympics and the 2000 Summer Olympics.
