= João Fernandes (rower) =

Portuguese rower

Personal information
- Nationality: Portuguese
- Born: 21 June 1976 (age 48)

Sport
- Sport: Rowing

João Fernandes (born 21 June 1976) is a Portuguese rower. He competed in the men's lightweight coxless four event at the 1996 Summer Olympics.
