= Juan Maricich =

Argentine canoeist

Personal information
- Full name: Juan Pablo Maricich Garcia
- Nationality: Argentine
- Born: 23 January 1972 (age 54)
- Height: 176 cm (5 ft 9 in)
- Weight: 72 kg (159 lb; 11 st 5 lb)

Sport
- Country: Argentina
- Sport: Canoe Slalom
- Events: Kayak Singles, Slalom, Barcelona 1992

Juan Pablo Maricich Garcia (born January 23, 1972) is an Argentine slalom canoer who competed in the early 1990s. He finished 37th in the K-1 event at the 1992 Summer Olympics in Barcelona.
