= Claudia Velásquez =

Peruvian swimmer

Personal information
- Full name: Claudia Silvana Velásquez Ponzoni
- Born: September 30, 1975 (age 50)

Sport
- Sport: Swimming
- Strokes: Breaststroke

Claudia Silvana Velásquez Ponzoni (born September 30, 1975) is a retired female breaststroke swimmer from Peru. She represented her native country at the 1992 Summer Olympics in Barcelona, Spain. She finished in 39th (100 m breaststroke) and in 37th place (200 m breaststroke).
