= Bruce Hick =

Australian rower (born 1963)

Bruce Hick OAM
Personal information
- Full name: Bruce Samuel Hick
- Born: 20 August 1963 (age 62)
- Years active: 1985–2000
- Spouse: Kay Hick

Sport
- Sport: Rowing
- Club: Leichhardt Rowing Club; Aust National University; Canberra Rowing Club
Medal record
Men's rowing
Representing Australia
Olympic Games
| Bronze medal – third place | 1996 Atlanta | Lightweight double sculls |
World Rowing Championships
| Gold medal – first place | 1991 Vienna | LM4x |
| Gold medal – first place | 1992 Montreal | LM2x |
| Gold medal – first place | 1993 Račice | LM2x |
| Silver medal – second place | 1994 Indianapolis | LM4- |
| Silver medal – second place | 1999 St. Catharines | LM2x |
| Bronze medal – third place | 1990 Tasmania | LM4x |
| Bronze medal – third place | 1995 Tampere | LM2x |
Commonwealth Rowing Championships
| Gold medal – first place | 1994 Ontario | LM4- |

Bruce Hick OAM (born 20 August 1963 in Rockhampton, Queensland) is an Australian national champion, three time World Champion and dual Olympian lightweight rower. He represented Australia over a fifteen-year period and rowed at ten World Rowing Championships.

== Club and state rowing ==
A sculler, Hick's senior rowing started from the Leichhardt Rowing Club in Rockhampton, Queensland. He first began contesting national championships events at the Australian Rowing Championships in 1985 in an u/23 single scull – he placed second.

By 1987 Hick had relocated to Canberra. He represented the Australian National University Boat Club in a lightweight pair and a lightweight four at the 1987 Australian Championships. The next year he rowed in ANU colours in a composite lightweight four and a lightweight eight.

From 1989 Hick was sculling and he contested the Australian national lightweight sculls championship rowing for the Canberra Rowing Club. He placed third that year. He eventually won the national single sculls title in 1992 – tieing for first place with his representative partner Gary Lynagh and then outright in 1996.

He raced in the New South Wales representative men's lightweight four who contested the Penrith Cup at the Interstate Regatta in 1987 (to victory) and in 1988. He contested the heavyweight singles sculls championship – the President's Cup – representing New South Wales in 1991, 1992 and 1993.

== International representative rowing ==
=== World Championships ===
Hick's first national representative selection was to the 1985 Match des Seniors in Banyoles Spain – the equivalent at the time of today's World Rowing U23 Championships. Hick stroked an Australian heavyweight double scull for fourth place.

His first senior Australian representative selection was in the men's lightweight eight for Copenhagen 1987 coached by Rusty Robertson. They placed eighth. The following year at Milan 1988 he was picked in the lightweight four. That crew rowed a brilliant semi final rowing down the Swedes to earn their place in the final. They battled well in the final but finished sixth.

Hick was selected for Australia at Lake Barrington 1990 in the lightweight Australian quad scull. Hick rowed with Gary Lynagh and two Tasmanians – Simon Burgess and Stephen Hawkins – to a bronze medal. The following year at Vienna 1991 that same crew won gold and a World Championship title. They rowed through the field and won by 0.23 seconds.

In 1992 Stephen Hawkins was selected in the Olympic heavyweight double scull and so the champion lightweight quad was broken up. At the 1992 lightweight World Championships Hick and Lynagh had success as a double winning the lightweight double scull world championship title. They repeated this feat at Racice 1993.

By Indianapolis 1994 Lynagh and Hick were rowing in the lightweight coxless four with South Australians Andrew Stunnell and James Seppelt. They took the silver medal. Hick was back in the lightweight double scull for Tampere 1995 with Anthony Edwards – he stroked that boat to a bronze medal.

Hick took a break after the 1996 Olympics and in 1998 competed at both World Rowing Cup events on the international calendar before teaming with his old partner Gary Lynagh to race a double scull at the 1998 World Rowing Championships in Cologne. They had a disappointing result, finishing second in the repechage and third in the C/D semi-final for an overall 12th placing. At St Catharine's 1999 Hick was paired up with Haimish Karrasch in the double scull. With Karrash in the stroke seat they won their heat and showed great form in the final into a tough head wind taking the silver medal behind the Italians.

=== Olympics ===
The 1996 Summer Olympics in Atlanta first saw lightweight events introduced to the Olympic regatta. With their great technical proficiency Hick and Edwards were selected again in the double scull and were expected to medal. The Swiss brothers Michael and Markus Gier were favourites and Hick and Edwards placed third beaten out by 0.21 by the Dutch crew for the silver medal.

For Sydney 2000 Hick was again paired with Haimish Karrash in the lightweight double scull with Hick setting the pace this time. They won their heat and looked comfortable in the semi-final until with 500 m to go they were unable to match the final sprint in a very tight race. They finished fourth and missed the final. They easily won the B final, placing seventh overall. Aged 37, this was Hick's last international appearance for Australia.

Hick was awarded the Medal of the Order of Australia in the 1994 Australia Day Honours for "service to rowing".
