= Xavier Dorfman =

French rower (born 1973)

Personal information
- Born: 12 May 1973 (age 53) Grenoble, France

Sport
- Sport: Rowing
Medal record
Representing France
Olympic Games
Gold medal – first place	2000 Sydney	Lightweight coxless four
World Championships
Gold medal – first place	2001 Lucerne	Lightweight eight
Silver medal – second place	1995 Tampere	Lightweight coxless pairs
Silver medal – second place	1997 Aiguebelette	Lightweight coxless four
Silver medal – second place	1998 Cologne	Lightweight coxless four
Bronze medal – third place	1999 St. Catharines	Lightweight coxless four
Bronze medal – third place	2001 Lucerne	Lightweight coxless four
Summer Universiade
Gold medal – first place	1993 Buffalo	Lightweight coxless four
Mediterranean Games
Gold medal – first place	1997 Bari	Lightweight coxless four

Xavier Elle Dorfman (born 12 May 1973) is a French competition rower and Olympic champion.

Dorfman won a gold medal in the lightweight coxless fours, at the 2000 Summer Olympics. He is married to fellow rower Bénédicte Dorfman-Luzuy.
