= Frits Sins =

Dutch slalom canoer (born 1964)

Frederik Jacobus Johannes "Frits" Sins (born 30 August 1964 in Sittard) is a Dutch slalom canoer who competed from the early 1980s to the mid-1990s. Competing in two Summer Olympics, he earned his best finish of 19th in the K-1 event in Barcelona in 1992.
