= Joana Soutinho =

Portuguese swimmer

Personal information
- Born: 8 November 1977 (age 48)

Sport
- Sport: Swimming

Joana Soutinho (born 8 November 1977) is a Portuguese swimmer. She competed in two events at the 1996 Summer Olympics.
