= Gernot Faderbauer =

Austrian lightweight rower

Personal information
- Born: 23 April 1969 (age 57)

Sport
- Sport: Rowing
Medal record
Men's rowing
Representing Austria
World Rowing Championships
Gold medal – first place	1993 Račice	Lwt quad scull
Gold medal – first place	1994 Indianapolis	Lwt quad scull
Gold medal – first place	1995 Tampere	Lwt quad scull

Gernot Faderbauer (born 23 April 1969) is an Austrian lightweight rower. He won a gold medal at the 1993 World Rowing Championships in Račice with the lightweight men's quadruple scull.
