= Alfredo Girón =

Spanish rower

Personal information
- Full name: Alfredo Girón Sopeña
- Nationality: Spanish
- Born: 11 February 1975 (age 50); Seville, Spain

Sport
- Sport: Rowing

Alfredo Girón Sopeña (Note: In this Spanish name, the first or paternal surname is Girón and the second or maternal family name is Sopeña.) (born 11 February 1975) is a Spanish rower. He is now a teacher in the IES Antonio Alvarez López. He competed in the men's lightweight coxless four event at the 1996 Summer Olympics.
