= Gary Wade (canoeist) =

South African canoeist

Gary Peter Wade (born 2 April 1970) is a South African slalom canoer who competed in the early 1990s. He finished 40th in the K-1 event at the 1992 Summer Olympics in Barcelona.
