= Selbach =

- Municipality
- Coat of arms

- Location of Selbach within Altenkirchen district
- Interactive map of Selbach
- Location within Germany Location within Rhineland-Palatinate
- Coordinates: 50°44′41″N 7°46′5″E
- Country: Germany
- State: Rhineland-Palatinate
- District: Altenkirchen
- Municipal assoc.: Wissen

Government
  - Mayor (2019–24): Matthias Grohs

Area
  - Total: 3.66 km^{2} (1.41 sq mi)
- Elevation: 220 m (720 ft)

Population (2025-12-31)
  - Total: 777
  - Density: 212/km^{2} (550/sq mi)
- Time zone: UTC+01:00 (CET)
  - Summer (DST): UTC+02:00 (CEST)
- Postal codes: 57537
- Dialling codes: 02742
- Vehicle registration: AK
- Website: selbach-sieg.de

Selbach is a municipality in the district of Altenkirchen, in Rhineland-Palatinate, in western Germany.

The place gave its name to Selbach, Rio Grande do Sul in southern Brazil, where since the pioneering days the Riograndenser Hunsrückisch language, a Brazilian variety of German largely based on the Rhine Franconian is spoken.
