= Jochen Lettmann =

Canoeist

Medal record

Men's canoe slalom

Representing Germany

Olympic Games
Bronze medal – third place	1992 Barcelona	K1

World Championships
Gold medal – first place	1995 Nottingham	K1 team
Bronze medal – third place	1997 Três Coroas	K1 team

European Championships
Gold medal – first place	1996 Augsburg	K1 team
Bronze medal – third place	1996 Augsburg	K1

Jochen Lettmann (born 10 April 1969, in Duisburg) is a German slalom canoeist who competed in the 1990s. Competing in two Summer Olympics, he won a bronze medal in the K1 event in Barcelona in 1992.

Lettmann also won two medals in the K1 team event at the ICF Canoe Slalom World Championships with a gold in 1995 and a bronze in 1997. He also has two medals from the 1996 European Championships in Augsburg (a team gold and an individual bronze).

== World Cup individual podiums ==
Season	Date	Venue	Position	Event
1992	31 May 1992	Nottingham	3rd	K1
1994	3 Jul 1994	Augsburg	1st	K1
1996	21 Apr 1996	Ocoee	3rd	K1
1996	9 Jun 1996	La Seu d'Urgell	3rd	K1
