= Markus Feusi =

Swiss rower

Personal information
- Nationality: Swiss
- Born: 24 August 1968 (age 56); Freienbach, Switzerland

Sport
- Sport: Rowing

Markus Feusi (born 24 August 1968) is a Swiss rower. He competed in the men's lightweight coxless four event at the 1996 Summer Olympics.
