= Christoph Schmölzer =

Austrian rower

Personal information
- Born: 30 November 1962 (age 63)

Sport
- Sport: Rowing
Medal record
Men's rowing
Representing Austria
World Rowing Championships
| Gold medal – first place | 1989 Bled | Lwt double scull |
| Gold medal – first place | 1993 Račice | Lwt quad scull |
| Gold medal – first place | 1994 Indianapolis | Lwt quad scull |
| Silver medal – second place | 1991 Vienna | Lwt double scull |
| Silver medal – second place | 1992 Montreal | Lwt double scull |
| Bronze medal – third place | 1990 Tasmania | Lwt double scull |

Christoph Schmölzer (born 30 November 1962) is an Austrian lightweight rower. He won a gold medal at the 1989 World Rowing Championships in Bled with the lightweight men's double scull.
