= Carla Cristina Ribeiro =

Portuguese sports shooter

Personal information
- Nationality: Portuguese
- Born: 29 May 1971 (age 53); Lisbon, Portugal

Sport
- Sport: Sports shooting

Carla Cristina Ribeiro (born 29 May 1971) is a Portuguese sports shooter. She competed at the 1992 Summer Olympics and the 1996 Summer Olympics.
