= Tsuyoshi Fujino =

Japanese canoeist (born 1962)

Tsuyoshi Fujino (Japanese: 剛藤野; born September 3, 1962, in Tokyo) is a Japanese slalom canoer who competed from the late 1970s to the mid-1990s. Competing in two Summer Olympics, he earned his best finish of 28th in the K-1 event in Barcelona in 1992.
