= Tom Kay (rower) =

British rower (born 1969)

Personal information
- Full name: Thomas Kay
- Born: 22 May 1969 (age 57) London
- Education: John Hampden Grammar School, High Wycombe
- Height: 185 cm (6 ft 1 in)
- Weight: 72 kg (159 lb)

Sport
- Sport: Rowing
Medal record
Men's rowing
Representing Great Britain
World Championships
Gold medal – first place	1991 Vienna	Lwt men's four
Gold medal – first place	1992 Montreal	Lwt men's four
Gold medal – first place	1994 Indianapolis	Lwt men's eight
Silver medal – second place	2003 Milan	Lwt men's single scull
Bronze medal – third place	1990 Tasmania	Lwt men's eight

Tom Kay (born 22 May 1969) is a British lightweight rower. He was three times world champion; twice with the lightweight men's four (in 1991 in Vienna and in 1992 in Montreal) and once with the lightweight men's eight (in 1994 in Indianapolis).
