= Manuel Fernandes (rower) =

Portuguese rower

Personal information
- Nationality: Portuguese
- Born: 11 December 1967 (age 57)

Sport
- Sport: Rowing

Manuel Fernandes (born 11 December 1967) is a Portuguese rower. He competed in the men's lightweight coxless four event at the 1996 Summer Olympics.
