= Selbach, Rio Grande do Sul =

Municipality in Rio Grande do Sul, Brazil

Coordinates: 28°38′S 52°58′W

- Municipality
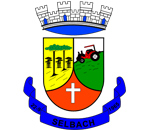
- Flag Coat of arms
- Interactive map of Selbach, Rio Grande do Sul
- Country: Brazil
- Time zone: UTC−3 (BRT)

Selbach is a municipality in the state of Rio Grande do Sul, Brazil. As of 2020, the estimated population was 5,107.

== Minority language ==
Since its foundation and pioneering days, the Riograndenser Hunsrückisch language, a Brazilian variety of German largely based on the Rhine Franconian has been present in this community.

There are many other municipalities with this bilingual profile throughout the state. In 2012 the state chamber of deputies voted unanimously in favor of recognizing this Germanic dialect an official historical culture good to be preserved.

Selbach in fact is named after Selbach, a municipality in Rhineland-Palatinate, in western Germany.

== See also ==
- List of municipalities in Rio Grande do Sul
