= Mathias Binder =

Swiss lightweight rower

Personal information
- Born: 24 July 1972 (age 53)

Sport
- Sport: Rowing
Medal record
Men's rowing
Representing Switzerland
World Rowing Championships
Gold medal – first place	1997 Aiguebelette	Lwt coxless pair

Mathias Binder (born 24 July 1972) is a Swiss lightweight rower. He won a gold medal at the 1997 World Rowing Championships in Aiguebelette with the lightweight men's coxless pair.
