= Juan Manuel Florido =

Spanish rower

Personal information
- Full name: Juan Manuel Florido Pellón
- Born: 24 January 1975 (age 51) Seville, Spain
- Height: 182 cm (6 ft 0 in)
- Weight: 73 kg (161 lb)

Sport
- Country: Spain
- Sport: Rowing
Medal record
World Championships
Silver medal – second place	2006 Eton	LM2-

Juan Manuel Florido Pellón (Note: In this Spanish name, the first or paternal surname is Florido and the second or maternal family name is Pellón.) (born 24 January 1975) is a Spanish rower. He competed in the men's lightweight coxless four event at the 1996 Summer Olympics.
