= Sara Antunes =

Portuguese sports shooter (born 1975)

Personal information
- Nationality: Portuguese
- Born: 23 May 1975 (age 50) Cascais, Portugal

Sport
- Sport: Sports shooting

Sara Antunes (born 23 May 1975) is a Portuguese sports shooter. She competed in two events at the 1996 Summer Olympics. Currently she is still an active athlete competing on an international level. She is also the rifle coach and shooting team leader in Ginásio Clube Português.
