= Leonardo Selbach =

Brazilian slalom canoeist (born 1971)

Leonardo Selbach (born 1 July 1971 in São Sebastião do Caí) is a Brazilian slalom canoeist who competed at the international level from 1992 to 2002.

Competing in two Summer Olympics, he earned his best finish of 23rd in the C1 event in Atlanta in 1996.

His younger brother Gustavo is also a two-time Olympian in canoe slalom.
