= Samuel Aguiar =

Portuguese rower (born 1968)

Personal information
- Nationality: Portuguese
- Born: 30 December 1968 (age 56)

Sport
- Sport: Rowing

Samuel Aguiar (born 30 December 1968) is a Portuguese rower. He competed in the men's lightweight coxless four event at the 1996 Summer Olympics.
