= Aníbal Fernandes =

Portuguese canoeist (born 1968)

Aníbal Ferreira Fernandes (born 29 February 1968) is a Portuguese slalom canoer.

== Career ==
Fernandes competed in the 1990s. He finished 30th in the K-1 event at the 1996 Summer Olympics in Atlanta.
