= Ivano Zasio =

Italian rower

Personal information
- Born: 6 April 1973 (age 53)

Sport
- Sport: Rowing
Medal record
Men's rowing
Representing Italy
World Rowing Championships
Gold medal – first place	1995 Tampere	Lwt men's four
Silver medal – second place	1993 Račice	Lwt men's quad scull
Silver medal – second place	1994 Indianapolis	Lwt men's quad scull

Ivano Zasio (born 6 April 1973) is an Italian lightweight rower. He won a gold medal at the 1995 World Rowing Championships in Tampere with the lightweight men's four.
