= Derek Holland (rower) =

Irish rower (born 1974)

Personal information
- Nationality: Irish
- Born: 14 January 1974 (age 52) Dublin, County Dublin, Ireland
- Height: 1.86 m (6 ft 1 in)
- Weight: 90 kg (198 lb)

Sport
- Country: Ireland
- Sport: Rowing
- Event(s): Lightweight men's four Lightweight men's eight

Derek Eugene Holland (born 14 January 1974 in Dublin) is an Irish rower and secondary school teacher at Enniskillen Royal Grammar School. He reached fourth place at the 1996 Summer Olympics in the Men's Lightweight Coxless Fours.

== Early life ==
Derek Holland was born on 14 January 1974 in Dublin in County Dublin, Ireland. Holland was introduced to rowing in 1987 aged around thirteen by his dad John Holland.

== Rowing career ==
=== Olympic games ===
When Derek Holland was 22, he won 4th in the Lightweight Men's Four at the 1996 Olympic Games held in Atlanta, United States.

=== World Championships ===
In 1989, Holland was selected for the Irish Junior team at the 1989 World Rowing Junior Championships held in Szeged, Hungary, and won 4th in the junior eight sculls. Derek Holland also competed in the 1995 World Rowing Championships in Tampere, Finland, coming first in the Lightweight Men's Four. Holland also competed in the 1996 World Rowing Championships in Glasgow, Great Britain, coming third in the Lightweight Men's Eight. In 1998 Derek competed in the 1998 World Rowing Championships which took place in Cologne, Germany, he got silver in the Lightweight Men's Four.

=== World Rowing Cups ===
In 1997 Derek competed in the 1997 World Rowing Cup II which took place in Paris, France, he placed 6th in the Lightweight Men's Four.

== Achievements ==
- World Championship medals: 4 gold, 6 silver, 5 bronze

=== Olympic Games ===
- 1996 – 4th, Coxless Four (with Sam Lynch, Tony O'Connor)

=== World Rowing Championships ===
- 2004 – Silver, Coxless Pair (with Neil Casey)
- 2004 – 4th, Coxless Pair (with Neil Casey)
- 2004 – 6th, Coxless Pair (with Neil Casey)
- 2003 – Silver, Coxless Pair (with Neil Casey)
- 2003 – Bronze, Coxless Pair (with Neil Casey)
- 2003 – 5th, Coxless Pair (with Neil Casey)
- 2002 – Gold, Coxless Four (with Neil Casey, Paul Griffin, Richard Archibald)
- 2002 – Gold, Coxless Four (with Neil Casey, Paul Griffin, Richard Archibald)
- 2002 – Silver, Coxless Four (with Neil Casey, Paul Griffin, Richard Archibald)
- 2002 – 4th, Coxless Four (with Neil Casey, Paul Griffin, Richard Archibald)
- 2001 – Silver, Coxless Four (with Neal Byrne, Owen Byrne, Noel Monahan)
- 2001 – Bronze, Coxless Four (with Neal Byrne, Owen Byrne, Noel Monahan)
- 2001 – 4th, Coxless Four (with Neal Byrne, Owen Byrne, Noel Monahan)
- 2000 – Bronze, Coxless Four (with James Lindsay-Fynn, John Armstrong, Noel Monahan)
- 2000 – 4th, Coxless Four (with James Lindsay-Fynn, John Armstrong, Noel Monahan)
- 2000 – 5th, Coxless Four (with James Lindsay-Fynn, John Armstrong, Noel Monahan)
- 2000 – 6th, Coxless Four (with James Lindsay-Fynn, John Armstrong, Noel Monahan)
- 1999 – Gold, Coxless Pair (with Niall O'Toole)
- 1999 – Silver, Coxless Pair (with Niall O'Toole)
- 1999 – Bronze, Coxless Pair (with Niall O'Toole)
- 1999 – 6th, Coxless Pair (with Niall O'Toole)
- 1998 – Silver, Coxless Four (with Neville Maxwell, Tony O'Connor, Brendan Dolan)
- 1996 – Bronze, Eight (with Sam Lynch, Peter Brady, Keith Flynn, Eoin Whelan, Adrian Smith, Paul Flannery, John Forde, Malachy McGlynn)
- 1995 – Gold, Coxless Four (with Sam Lynch, Conor Moloney, Paul Flannery)

=== Junior World Rowing Championships ===
- 1989 – Eight (with Angus Woods, Manus Crowley, Colm O'Rourke, Owen Diviney, Eugene McCarthy, Peter Collins, Brian Collins, Tom Colsh)
