= Leonardo Pettinari (rower) =

Italian rower

Medal record

Men's rowing

Representing Italy

Olympic Games
Silver medal – second place	2000 Sydney	LM2x

World Rowing Championships
Gold medal – first place	1994 Indianapolis	LM2-
Gold medal – first place	1995 Tampere	LM4-
Gold medal – first place	1999 St. Catharines	LM2x
Gold medal – first place	2001 Lucerne	LM2x
Gold medal – first place	2002 Seville	LM2x
Gold medal – first place	2003 Milan	LM2x
Gold medal – first place	2007 Munich	LM4x
Silver medal – second place	1997 Aiguebelette	LM2x
Silver medal – second place	1998 Cologne	LM2x
Bronze medal – third place	1993 Račice	LM8+

Mediterranean Games
Bronze medal – third place	2005 Almería	Lwt double scull

Leonardo Pettinari (born 19 April 1973 in Pontedera) is an Italian rower.
