= Tony O'Connor (rower) =

Irish rower

Personal information
- Nationality: Irish
- Born: 1969 (age 56–57)

Sport
- Sport: Rowing

Tony O'Connor is a former international rower from Ireland. He is a double Olympian who represented Ireland and won five medals at the World Championships as part of a lightweight pair. In 2016, Tony also coached at the Southern Rowing Performance Centre. He was born on June 1, 1969 (age 56), in Grimsby, UK.

A member of the Shannon and Neptune Rowing Clubs, he holds the record for most senior Irish Rowing Championship wins (21). He has won 5 medals at the World Rowing Championships in the Men's Lightweight Pair: Gold in 2001; Silvers in 1996 and 1997: Bronzes in 1994 and 1999. He and partner Neville Maxwell held the World Best Time for Men's Lightweight Pair, 6:26.61 set at Paris in 1994. He has been twice an Olympian, finishing 4th in the Men's Lightweight Coxless Four in Atlanta 1996, and 11th in the same event at Sydney 2000.

Tony O'Connor was also the coach for the New Zealand men's eight, which won gold at the 2020 Summer Olympics. As part of this, he also featured in a documentary called ‘The Rowing Teacher’.

Tony O’Connor currently coaches at Christ's College, Canterbury, New Zealand, where he also teaches mathematics.
