= Gustavo Selbach =

Brazilian slalom canoeist (born 1974)

Medal record

Men's canoe slalom

Representing Brazil

Junior World Championships
Bronze medal – third place	1992 Sjoa	K1

Gustavo Selbach (born 25 August 1974 in Três Coroas) is a Brazilian slalom canoeist who competed at the international level from 1992 to 2010.

Competing in two Summer Olympics, he earned his best finish of 31st in the K1 event in Barcelona in 1992.

His older brother Leonardo is also a two-time Olympian in canoe slalom.
