= Martin Weis =

German rower

Personal information
- Nationality: German
- Born: 25 December 1970 (age 54); Aschaffenburg, West Germany

Sport
- Sport: Rowing

Martin Weis (born 25 December 1970) is a German former rower. He competed at the 1996 Summer Olympics and the 2000 Summer Olympics.
