= Gary Lynagh =

Australian rower

Personal information
- Born: Gary Joseph James Lynagh; 4 June 1970 (age 56)
- Years active: 1988–98

Sport
- Sport: Rowing
- Club: Commercial Rowing Club
Medal record
Men's rowing
Representing Australia
World Rowing Championships
Gold medal – first place	1991 Vienna	Lwt quad scull
Gold medal – first place	1992 Montreal	Lwt double scull
Gold medal – first place	1993 Račice	Lwt double scull
Silver medal – second place	1994 Indianapolis	Lwt four
Bronze medal – third place	1990 Tasmania	Lwt quad scull
Commonwealth Rowing Championships
Gold medal – first place	1994 Ontario	Lwt four

Gary Joseph James Lynagh OAM (born 4 June 1970) is an eleven time Australian national champion, three time World Champion and Olympian lightweight rower. He represented Australia at every premier international regatta from 1990 to 1998.

== Club and state rowing ==
Lynagh's senior rowing was from the Commercial Rowing Club in Brisbane. He began contesting national lightweight championship sculling titles at the Australian Rowing Championships in 1988 representing Commercial. In 1989 he was in a composite Queensland lightweight eight who won the national title and in 1990 he won two Australian national championships – the lightweight double scull and the quad scull titles. He won the national championship quad in 1991, a single sculls title in 1992, the double scull in 1993 and 1994 and the quad in 1993, 1994 and 1996. In 1996 in a composite Australian selection crew Lynagh also won the national lightweight coxless four title at the Australian Championships.

He raced in the Queensland representative men's lightweight four who contested the Penrith Cup at the Interstate Regatta in 1992, 1995, 1996 and 1998. He contested the heavyweight singles sculls championship – the President's Cup – representing Queensland in 1993 and 1994.

== International representative rowing ==
Lynagh was first selected to represent Australia at Lake Barrington 1990 in the lightweight Australian quad scull. Lynagh rowed with Bruce Hick and two Tasmanians – Simon Burgess and Stephen Hawkins – to a bronze medal. The following year at Vienna 1991 that same crew won gold and a World Championship title. They rowed through the field and won by 0.23 seconds.

In 1992 Stephen Hawkins was selected in the Olympic heavyweight double scull and so the champion lightweight quad was broken up. At the 1992 lightweight World Championships Lynagh and Hick had success as a double winning the lightweight double scull world championship title . They repeated this feat at Racice 1993.

By Indianapolis 1994 Lynagh and Hick were rowing in the lightweight coxless four with South Australians Andrew Stunnell and James Seppelt. They took the silver medal. Lynagh was back in the quad for Tampere 1995 – he stroked that crew to a sixth placing.

In the 1995 Australia Day Honours Lynagh was awarded the Medal of the Order of Australia for "service to rowing".

The 1996 Summer Olympics in Atlanta saw lightweight events introduced to the Olympic regatta for the first time. Lynagh was selected with his longstanding sculling partner Simon Burgess in the lightweight coxless four along with Haimish Karrasch and David Belcher. They made the Olympic final and placed sixth.

Lynagh competed at all four World Rowing Cup events on the international calendar in 1997 and 1998. He was teamed with Anthony Edwards for the 1997 World Rowing Championships in Aiguebelette, stroking their double scull to fifth place. At the 1998 World Rowing Championships in Cologne he raced a double scull with his old partner Bruce Hick and had a disappointing result, finishing second in the repechage and third in the C/D semi-final for an overall 12th placing. This was his last representative appearance for Australia.
