= Neville Maxwell (rower) =

Irish rower

Personal information
- Nationality: Irish
- Born: 15 May 1970 (age 55); County Galway, Ireland

Sport
- Sport: Rowing

Neville Maxwell (born 15 May 1970) is an Irish rower. He competed at the 1996 Summer Olympics and the 2000 Summer Olympics. Maxwell attended St Joseph's Patrician College.
