= Henrique Baixinho =

Portuguese rower (born 1961)

Personal information
- Full name: Henrique Baixinho Capela
- Nationality: Portuguese
- Born: 23 September 1961 (age 63)

Sport
- Sport: Rowing

Henrique Baixinho Capela (born 23 September 1961) is a Portuguese rower. He competed in the men's lightweight coxless four event at the 1996 Summer Olympics.
