= Commonwealth Rowing Championships =

Commonwealth Rowing Championship logo

The Commonwealth Rowing Championships are a regatta for rowers from Commonwealth nations held in conjunction with the Commonwealth Games. Rowing is classed as an 'optional' sport for the purposes of the Commonwealth Games, but is currently not included in the Commonwealth Games programme itself. The Championships are therefore usually held immediately after or before the Games themselves in the same host city, or nearby. They are a recognised championships by the Commonwealth Games Federation, and the Federation provides the medals for the victors.

== History ==
In 1994 and 1999 the Commonwealth Rowing Association organised a Commonwealth Rowing Regatta at Fanshawe Lake, London, Ontario, Canada.

In August 2002 the first official Commonwealth Rowing Championships were held in Holme Pierrepont, Nottingham, England, and the 2006 Championships were held at Strathclyde Park, Motherwell, Scotland.

The 2010 Championships were held on 31 July and 1 August at Welland, Ontario, Canada.

In August 2014 the Championships were held, on a 1500-metre course, again at Strathclyde Park, Motherwell, Scotland.

In 2018 there was a Commonwealth Beach Sprint Championships at Sandbanks, Poole, England on 17-18 August.

== 2002 participating nations and medal count ==
This is the full table of the medal count of the first Commonwealth Rowing Championships. These rankings sort by the number of gold medals earned by a country. The number of silvers is taken into consideration next and then the number of bronze. If, after the above, countries are still tied, equal ranking is given and they are listed alphabetically. This follows the system used by the IOC, IAAF and BBC.

* Host nation (England)

Rank	Nation	Gold	Silver	Bronze	Total
1	Australia	7	1	0	8
2	Canada	6	4	0	10
3	England*	5	10	6	21
4	Scotland	1	3	3	7
5	Wales	1	2	9	12
6	Zimbabwe	1	1	0	2
7	New Zealand	1	0	1	2
8	South Africa	1	0	0	1
9	Northern Ireland	0	2	4	6
10	Guernsey	0	0	0	0
Totals (10 entries)		23	23	23	69

== 2006 participating nations and medal count ==
The second Commonwealth Rowing Championships were held in August 2006 at Strathclyde Park, Motherwell, Scotland.

* Host nation (Scotland)

Rank	Nation	Gold	Silver	Bronze	Total
1	England	10	5	5	20
2	South Africa	4	0	1	5
3	Canada	3	6	2	11
4	Scotland*	2	3	3	8
5	Northern Ireland	1	4	1	6
6	New Zealand	1	0	0	1
7	Wales	0	3	4	7
8	Australia	0	0	3	3
9	Kenya	0	0	0	0
Totals (9 entries)		21	21	19	61

== 2010 participating nations and medal count ==
The third Commonwealth Rowing Championships were held in July & August 2010 at Welland, Ontario, Canada.

* Host nation (Canada)

Rank	Nation	Gold	Silver	Bronze	Total
1	Canada*	10	4	3	17
2	Scotland	5	4	8	17
3	Australia	4	8	1	13
4	England	3	4	9	16
5	Wales	0	2	0	2
6	Norfolk Island	0	0	1	1
Totals (6 entries)		22	22	22	66

== 2014 participating nations and medal count ==
The fourth Commonwealth Rowing Championships were held in August 2014, on a 1500-metre course, at Strathclyde Park, Motherwell, Scotland.

* Host nation (Scotland)

Rank	Nation	Gold	Silver	Bronze	Total
1	Scotland*	9	4	2	15
2	England	5	7	3	15
3	Canada	4	4	5	13
4	Wales	1	4	5	10
5	Australia	1	1	0	2
6	Northern Ireland	0	0	2	2
7	Norfolk Island	0	0	1	1
8	Gibraltar	0	0	0	0
8	Guernsey	0	0	0	0
8	Isle of Man	0	0	0	0
8	Namibia	0	0	0	0
8	Nigeria	0	0	0	0
8	Vanuatu	0	0	0	0
8	Zambia	0	0	0	0
Totals (14 entries)		20	20	18	58

== 2018 participating nations and medal count ==
The fifth edition of Commonwealth Rowing Championships was in the form of the Commonwealth Beach Sprint Regatta at Sandbanks, Poole, England in August 2018.

* Host nation (England)

Rank	Nation	Gold	Silver	Bronze	Total
1	Scotland	4	1	1	6
2	Canada	1	3	1	5
3	Vanuatu	1	0	0	1
4	England*	0	2	3	5
5	Wales	0	0	1	1
6	Namibia	0	0	0	0
6	Uganda	0	0	0	0
Totals (7 entries)		6	6	6	18

== 2022 participating nations and medal count ==
The sixth edition of the Commonwealth Rowing Championships was in the form of the Commonwealth Rowing Association Beach Sprint Championships at Independence Beach, Walvis Bay, Namibia in December 2022.

This marks the first time the event has been held in Africa.

* Host nation (Namibia)

Rank	Nation	Gold	Silver	Bronze	Total
1	Scotland	3	0	0	3
2	Australia	1	0	1	2
3	England	0	3	0	3
4	Wales	0	1	1	2
5	Canada	0	0	3	3
6	Bahamas	0	0	0	0
6	Barbados	0	0	0	0
6	Jersey	0	0	0	0
6	Kenya	0	0	0	0
6	Namibia*	0	0	0	0
6	South Africa	0	0	0	0
6	Uganda	0	0	0	0
6	Zambia	0	0	0	0
Totals (13 entries)		4	4	5	13

== 2025 participating nations and medal count ==
The seventh edition of the Commonwealth Rowing Championships was in the form of the Commonwealth Rowing Association Beach Sprint Championships at Browne’s Beach, Bridgetown, Barbados from November 21 to 23, 2025.

This marks the first time the event has been held in the Caribbean.

Events included Men's Solo, Women's Solo, and Mixed doubles across U19, U21, and Senior categories. U19 and U21 categories were included for the first time.

Full regatta results can be found on Regatta Master.

* Host nation (Barbados)

Rank	Nation	Gold	Silver	Bronze	Total
1	Australia	7	0	0	7
2	Canada	2	2	2	6
3	Guernsey	1	0	0	1
4	Barbados*	0	2	1	3
4	Scotland	0	2	1	3
4	Wales	0	2	1	3
7	England	0	1	2	3
8	Jersey	0	1	1	2
9	Turks and Caicos Islands	0	0	1	1
9	Uganda	0	0	1	1
11	Cyprus	0	0	0	0
11	Namibia	0	0	0	0
11	South Africa	0	0	0	0
11	Vanuatu	0	0	0	0
Totals (14 entries)		10	10	10	30

Both Barbados and Uganda were awarded Bronze in the Men's U19 1x. Only two entries competed in the Mixed U19 2x.
