= Rowing at the 1996 Summer Olympics – Women's lightweight double sculls =

Women's lightweight double sculls at the Games of the XXVI Olympiad
- Date: 22–28 July 1996
- Competitors: 33 from 16 nations

Medalists
1st place, gold medalist(s)		Constanța Burcică; Camelia Macoviciuc	Romania
2nd place, silver medalist(s)		Teresa Bell; Lindsay Burns	United States
3rd place, bronze medalist(s)		Virginia Lee; Rebecca Joyce	Australia

The inaugural women's lightweight double sculls competition at the 1996 Summer Olympics in Atlanta, Georgia took place at Lake Lanier.

== Results ==
=== Heats ===
The winner of each heat advanced to the semifinals, remainder go to the repechage.

==== Heat 1 ====
Rank	Rower	Country	Time	Notes
1	Teresa Bell; Lindsay Burns	United States	7:28.28	S
2	Lisa Bertini; Martina Orzan	Italy	7:31.58	R
3	Laurien Vermulst; Ellen Meliesie	Netherlands	7:32.30	R
4	Li Fei; Ou Shaoyan	China	7:36.71	R
5	Myriam Lamolle; Catherine Muller	France	7:36.75	R
6	Angeliki Gremou; Chrysi Biskitzi	Greece	8:01.60	R

==== Heat 2 ====
Rank	Rower	Country	Time	Notes
1	Virginia Lee; Rebecca Joyce	Australia	7:33.16	S
2	Michelle Darvill; Ruth Kaps	Germany	7:45.52	R
3	Monika Knejp; Kristina Knejp	Sweden	7:48.15	R
4	Anna Accensi; Esperanza Márquez; Nuria Domínguez	Spain	7:51.05	R
5	Ayako Yoshida; Noriko Shibuta	Japan	7:55.99	R

==== Heat 3 ====
Rank	Rower	Country	Time	Notes
1	Constanța Burcică; Camelia Macoviciuc	Romania	7:33.61	S
2	Berit Christoffersen; Lene Andersson	Denmark	7:36.47	R
3	Colleen Miller; Wendy Wiebe	Canada	7:41.20	R
4	Karola Schustereder; Monika Felizeter	Austria	7:45.45	R
5	Ana Sofía Soberanes; Andrea Boltz	Mexico	8:00.92	R

=== Repechage ===
The first three places advanced to the semifinals, remainder go to the Final C.

==== Repechage 1 ====
Rank	Rower	Country	Time	Notes
1	Laurien Vermulst; Ellen Meliesie	Netherlands	7:00.17	S
2	Michelle Darvill; Ruth Kaps	Germany	7:05.29	S
3	Karola Schustereder; Monika Felizeter	Austria	7:07.34	S
4	Ayako Yoshida; Noriko Shibuta	Japan	7:15.61	FC
5	Angeliki Gremou; Chrysi Biskitzi	Greece	7:21.39	FC

==== Repechage 2 ====
Rank	Rower	Country	Time	Notes
1	Lisa Bertini; Martina Orzan	Italy	6:59.06	S
2	Colleen Miller; Wendy Wiebe	Canada	7:02.54	S
3	Myriam Lamolle; Catherine Muller	France	7:03.27	S
4	Anna Accensi; Esperanza Márquez; Nuria Domínguez	Spain	7:12.96	FC

==== Repechage 3 ====
Rank	Rower	Country	Time	Notes
1	Berit Christoffersen; Lene Andersson	Denmark	7:03.80	S
2	Monika Knejp; Kristina Knejp	Sweden	7:03.68	S
3	Li Fei; Ou Shaoyan	China	7:10.96	S
4	Ana Sofía Soberanes; Andrea Boltz	Mexico	7:18.31	FC

=== Semifinals ===
The first three places advanced to the Final A, remainder go to the Final B.

==== Semifinal 1 ====
Rank	Rower	Country	Time	Notes
1	Teresa Bell; Lindsay Burns	United States	7:09.47	FA
2	Constanța Burcică; Camelia Macoviciuc	Romania	7:11.13	FA
3	Lisa Bertini; Martina Orzan	Italy	7:15.29	FA
4	Michelle Darvill; Ruth Kaps	Germany	7:19.69	FB
5	Myriam Lamolle; Catherine Muller	France	7:20.11	FB
6	Monika Knejp; Kristina Knejp	Sweden	7:27.01	FB

==== Semifinal 2 ====
Rank	Rower	Country	Time	Notes
1	Virginia Lee; Rebecca Joyce	Australia	7:17.67	FA
2	Laurien Vermulst; Ellen Meliesie	Netherlands	7:19.20	FA
3	Berit Christoffersen; Lene Andersson	Denmark	7:19.79	FA
4	Li Fei; Ou Shaoyan	China	7:23.46	FB
5	Colleen Miller; Wendy Wiebe	Canada	7:27.19	FB
6	Karola Schustereder; Monika Felizeter	Austria	7:32.07	FB

=== Finals ===
==== Final C ====
Rank	Rower	Country	Time	Notes
13	Ayako Yoshida; Noriko Shibuta	Japan	7:44.81	
14	Ana Sofía Soberanes; Andrea Boltz	Mexico	7:46.57	
15	Angeliki Gremou; Chrysi Biskitzi	Greece	7:51.80	
16	Anna Accensi; Esperanza Márquez; Nuria Domínguez	Spain	7:55.84	

==== Final B ====
Rank	Rower	Country	Time	Notes
7	Colleen Miller; Wendy Wiebe	Canada	7:03.87	
8	Michelle Darvill; Ruth Kaps	Germany	7:04.31	
9	Li Fei; Ou Shaoyan	China	7:07.81	
10	Myriam Lamolle; Catherine Muller	France	7:09.95	
11	Karola Schustereder; Monika Felizeter	Austria	7:11.22	
12	Monika Knejp; Kristina Knejp	Sweden	7:12.03	

==== Final A ====
Rank	Rower	Country	Time	Notes
1st place, gold medalist(s)	Constanța Burcică; Camelia Macoviciuc	Romania	7:12.78	
2nd place, silver medalist(s)	Teresa Bell; Lindsay Burns	United States	7:14.65	
3rd place, bronze medalist(s)	Virginia Lee; Rebecca Joyce	Australia	7:16.56	
4	Lisa Bertini; Martina Orzan	Italy	7:16.83	
5	Berit Christoffersen; Lene Andersson	Denmark	7:18.20	
6	Laurien Vermulst; Ellen Meliesie	Netherlands	7:21.92	
