= Rowing at the 1996 Summer Olympics – Men's lightweight double sculls =

Men's lightweight double sculls at the Games of the XXVI Olympiad
- Venue: Lake Lanier
- Date: 22–28 July 1996
- Competitors: 38 from 19 nations
- Winning time: 6:23.47

Medalists
1st place, gold medalist(s)		Markus Gier; Michael Gier	Switzerland
2nd place, silver medalist(s)		Maarten van der Linden; Pepijn Aardewijn	Netherlands
3rd place, bronze medalist(s)		Anthony Edwards; Bruce Hick	Australia

The men's lightweight double sculls competition at the 1996 Summer Olympics in Georgia, USA took place at Lake Lanier.

== Competition format ==
This was the first time this event was a part of the Olympic rowing regatta.

This rowing event is a double scull event, meaning that each boat is propelled by a pair of rowers. The "scull" portion means that the rower uses two oars, one on each side of the boat; this contrasts with sweep rowing in which each rower has one oar and rows on only one side. As a lightweight rowing competition, the body mass of the rowers was limited to a maximum of 72.5 kilograms each and 70 kilograms on average.

The competition consisted of multiple rounds. Finals were held to determine the placing of each boat; these finals were given letters with those nearer to the beginning of the alphabet meaning a better ranking. Semifinals were named based on which finals they fed, with each semifinal having two possible finals.

With 19 boats in heats, the best boats qualify directly for the semi-finals. All other boats progress to the repechage round, which offers a second chance to qualify for the semi-finals. Unsuccessful boats from the repechage must proceed to final C, which determines places 13-18. The best three boats in each of the two semi-finals qualify for final A, which determines places 1–6 (including the medals). Unsuccessful boats from semi-finals A/B go forward to final B, which determines places 7–12.

== Results ==
=== Heats ===
The winner of each heat advanced to the semifinals, remainder goes to the repechage.

==== Heat 1 ====
Rank	Rower	Country	Time	Notes
1	Maarten van der Linden; Pepijn Aardewijn	Netherlands	6:49.93	Q
2	Tom Auth; Stephen Peterson	United States	6:50.55	R
3	Vasileios Polymeros; Ioannis Kourkourikis	Greece	6:50.57	R
4	Fernando Zapata; Agustin Rocha	Argentina	7:07.50	R
5	Mattias Tichy; Anders Christensson	Sweden	7:18.87	R

==== Heat 2 ====
Rank	Rower	Country	Time	Notes
1	Jose Maria de Marco; Juan Carlos Saez	Spain	6:46.66	Q
2	Marco Audisio; Michelangelo Crispi	Italy	6:47.26	R
3	Robert Sycz; Grzegorz Wdowiak	Poland	6:54.68	R
4	Brendan Dolan; Niall O'Toole	Ireland	6:56.28	R
5	Nick Strange; Andrew Sinton	Great Britain	6:56.86	R

==== Heat 3 ====
Rank	Rower	Country	Time	Notes
1	Markus Gier; Michael Gier	Switzerland	6:47.28	Q
2	Wolfgang Sigl; Walter Rantasa	Austria	6:54.36	R
3	Magne Kvalvik; Tor Albert Ersdal	Norway	6:57.37	R
4	Raul Leon; Alexis Arias	Cuba	7:01.03	R
5	Adam Michalek; Michal Vabrousek	Czech Republic	7:16.07	R

==== Heat 4 ====
Rank	Rower	Country	Time	Notes
1	Anthony Edwards, Bruce Hick	Australia	6:49.95	Q
2	Peter Uhrig; Ingo Euler	Germany	6:54.82	R
3	Kenichi Obinata; Hitoshi Hase	Japan	6:56.17	R
4	Rob Hamill; Mike Rodger	New Zealand	7:09.61	R

=== Repechage ===
The first 2 boats in each repechage qualified for semi-finals 1/2 and the rest for semi-finals 3/4

==== Repechage 1 ====
Rank	Rower	Country	Time	Notes
1	Mattias Tichy; Anders Christensson	Sweden	6:17.84	1/2
2	Peter Uhrig; Ingo Euler	Germany	6:18.11	1/2
3	Brendan Dolan; Niall O'Toole	Ireland	6:18.38	3/4
4	Magne Kvalvik; Tor Albert Ersdal	Norway	6:26.68	3/4

==== Repechage 2 ====
Rank	Rower	Country	Time	Notes
1	Wolfgang Sigl; Walter Rantasa	Austria	6:21.10	1/2
2	Robert Sycz; Grzegorz Wdowiak	Poland	6:24.19	1/2
3	Fernando Zapata; Agustin Rocha	Argentina	6:28.08	3/4

==== Repechage 3 ====
Rank	Rower	Country	Time	Notes
1	Marco Audisio; Michelangelo Crispi	Italy	6:19.95	1/2
2	Vasileios Polymeros; Ioannis Kourkourikis	Greece	6:24.40	1/2
3	Adam Michalek; Michal Vabrousek	Czech Republic	6:30.34	3/4
4	Rob Hamill; Mike Rodger	New Zealand	6:34.78	3/4

==== Repechage 4 ====
Rank	Rower	Country	Time	Notes
1	Tom Auth; Stephen Peterson	United States	6:20.93	1/2
2	Nick Strange; Andrew Sinton	Great Britain	6:22.27	1/2
3	Raul Leon; Alexis Arias	Cuba	6:23.52	3/4
4	Kenichi Obinata; Hitoshi Hase	Japan	6:24.68	3/4

=== Semifinals ===
In the first 2 Semi-finals, the first three places advance to Final A, the remainder to Final B.
In 3rd and 4th Semi-finals, the last place finisher was eliminated and the remaining boats advanced to Final C.

==== Semifinal 1 ====
Rank	Rower	Country	Time	Notes
1	Markus Gier; Michael Gier	Switzerland	6:25.37	A
2	Maarten van der Linden; Pepijn Aardewijn	Netherlands	6:27.07	A
3	Wolfgang Sigl; Walter Rantasa	Austria	6:28.06	A
4	Tom Auth; Stephen Peterson	United States	6:29.80	B
5	Vasileios Polymeros; Ioannis Kourkourikis	Greece	6:34.84	B
6	Peter Uhrig; Ingo Euler	Germany	6:40.14	B

==== Semifinal 2 ====
Rank	Rower	Country	Time	Notes
1	Mattias Tichy; Anders Christensson	Sweden	6:29.17	A
2	Anthony Edwards, Bruce Hick	Australia	6:29.27	A
3	Jose Maria de Marco; Juan Carlos Saez	Spain	6:29.37	A
4	Marco Audisio; Michelangelo Crispi	Italy	6:30.46	B
5	Nick Strange; Andrew Sinton	Great Britain	6:39.20	B
6	Robert Sycz; Grzegorz Wdowiak	Poland	6:39.56	B

==== Semifinal 3 ====
Rank	Rower	Country	Time	Notes
1	Adam Michalek; Michal Vabrousek	Czech Republic	6:41.41	C
2	Kenichi Obinata; Hitoshi Hase	Japan	6:45.08	C
3	Brendan Dolan; Niall O'Toole	Ireland	8:14.64	

==== Semifinal 4 ====
Rank	Rower	Country	Time	Notes
1	Magne Kvalvik; Tor Albert Ersdal	Norway	6:36.30	C
2	Raul Leon; Alexis Arias	Cuba	6:37.40	C
3	Fernando Zapata; Agustin Rocha	Argentina	6:38.55	C
4	Rob Hamill; Mike Rodger	New Zealand	6:41.39	

=== Finals ===
==== Final C ====
Rank	Rower	Country	Time	Notes
13	Adam Michalek; Michal Vabrousek	Czech Republic	6:53.14	
14	Magne Kvalvik; Tor Albert Ersdal	Norway	6:55.35	
14	Kenichi Obinata; Hitoshi Hase	Japan	6:56.13	
15	Raul Leon; Alexis Arias	Cuba	6:58.63	
16	Fernando Zapata; Agustin Rocha	Argentina	7:04.67	

==== Final B ====
Rank	Rower	Country	Time	Notes
7	Robert Sycz; Grzegorz Wdowiak	Poland	6:24.95	
8	Marco Audisio; Michelangelo Crispi	Italy	6:25.04	
9	Tom Auth; Stephen Peterson	United States	6:25.89	
10	Vasileios Polymeros; Ioannis Kourkourikis	Greece	6:27.94	
11	Peter Uhrig; Ingo Euler	Germany	6:30.43	
12	Nick Strange; Andrew Sinton	Great Britain	6:31.15	

==== Final A ====
Rank	Rower	Country	Time	Notes
1st place, gold medalist(s)	Markus Gier; Michael Gier	Switzerland	6:23.47	
2nd place, silver medalist(s)	Maarten van der Linden; Pepijn Aardewijn	Netherlands	6:26.48	
3rd place, bronze medalist(s)	Anthony Edwards, Bruce Hick	Australia	6:26.69	
4	Jose Maria de Marco; Juan Carlos Saez	Spain	6:28.09	
5	Wolfgang Sigl; Walter Rantasa	Austria	6:30.85	
6	Mattias Tichy; Anders Christensson	Sweden	6:34.78	
