= Bertini =

Bertini may refer to:

== People ==
- Adriana Bertini, Brazilian fashion designer
- Alba de Céspedes y Bertini (1911–1997), Cuban-Italian writer
- Catherine Bertini (born 1950), American public servant
- Demostene Bertini or Démosthenes Magalhães, Brazilian football player
- Eugenio Bertini (1846–1933), Italian mathematician
- Francesca Bertini (1892–1985), Italian silent film actress
- Gary Bertini (1927–2005), Israeli conductor
- Franco Bertini (born 1938), Italian basketball player
- Giovanni Bertini (1951–2019), Italian football player
- Giuseppe Bertini (1825–1898), Italian painter
- Henri Bertini (1798–1876), French composer and pianist
- Ivano Bertini (1940-2012), Italian chemist
- Lisa Bertini (born 1972), Italian rower
- Lorenzo Bertini (rower) (born 1976), Italian rower
- Lorenzo Bertini (footballer) (born 2001), Italian football player
- Mario Bertini (born 1944), Italian football player
- Nina Bertini-Humphreys, Irish-born opera singer
- Romeo Bertini (1893–1973), Italian athlete
- Sabrina Bertini (born 1969), Italian volleyball player
- Silvano Bertini (1940–2021), Italian boxer

== Other ==
- Mantidactylus bertini, a species of frog in the family Mantellidae
- Ulmus 'Pyramidalis Bertini', an elm cultivar
- Theorem of Bertini, an existence and genericity theorem
