= 1995 World Rowing Championships =

International rowing event

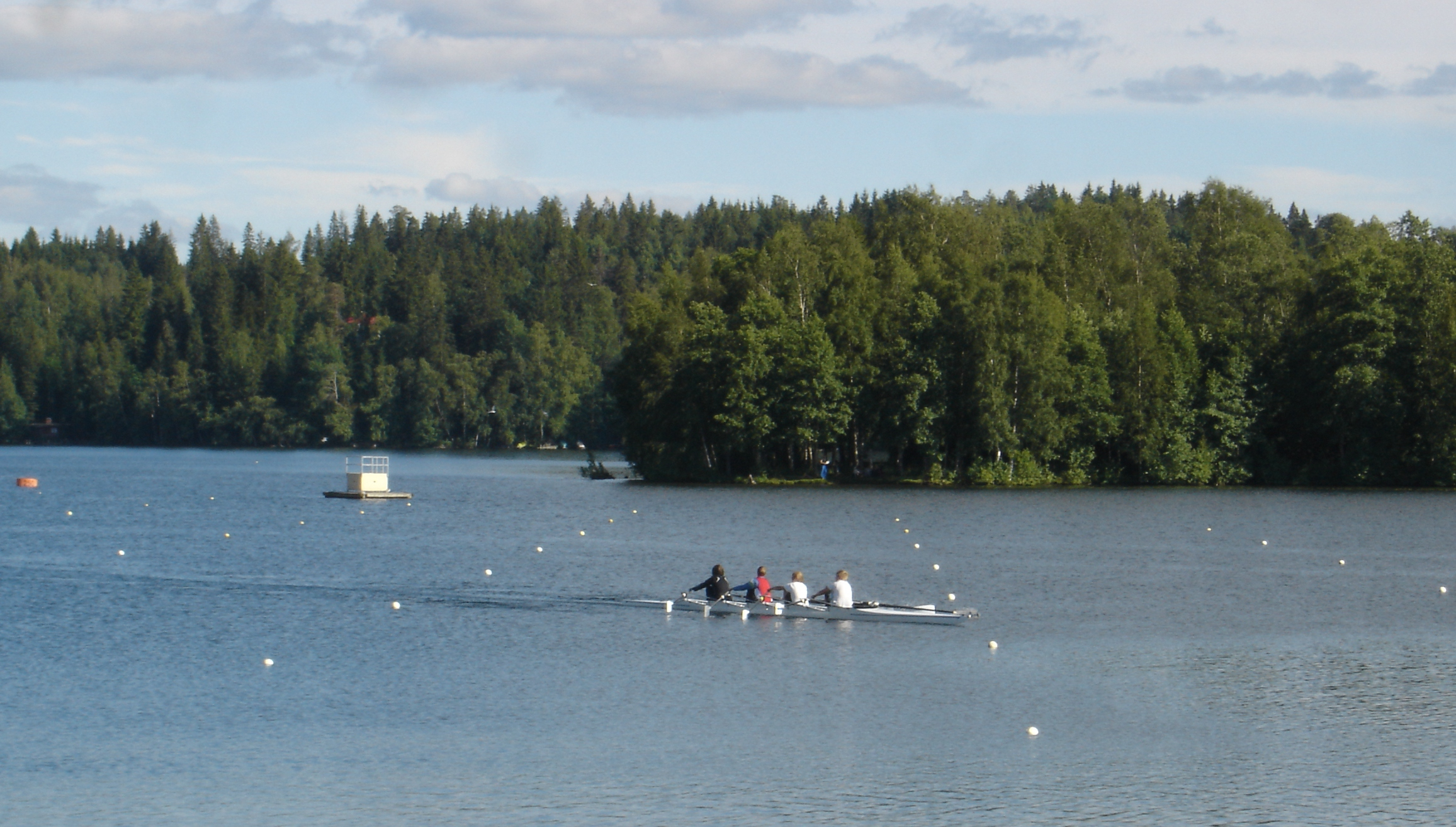
- Sculling on Lake Kaukajärvi
- Venue: Lake Kaukajärvi
- Location: Tampere, Finland
- Dates: 20 to 28 August 1995

The 1995 World Rowing Championships were World Rowing Championships that were held from 20 to 28 August 1995 at Lake Kaukajärvi, Tampere, Finland.

== Events ==
The women's lightweight four (LW4-) was poorly subscribed, with only five nations entering boats; no heats were thus had. The Australian team, although present, did not start. The Danish rower in seat two caught a crab and injured herself, and they did not finish. Therefore, all finishers received a medal, with the team from the United States the overall winners.

== Medal summary ==
=== Men's events ===
Event	Gold	Time	Silver	Time	Bronze	Time
M1x	Slovenia; Iztok Čop	6:52.93	Estonia; Jüri Jaanson	6:53.48	Czech Republic; Václav Chalupa	6:54.14
M2x	Denmark; Lars Christensen; Martin Haldbo Hansen	6:17.01	Germany; André Steiner; Stephan Volkert	6:19.42	Norway; Steffen Størseth; Kjetil Undset	6:21.84
M4x	Italy; Alessandro Corona; Rossano Galtarossa; Massimo Paradiso; Alessio Sartori	6:10.09	Germany; Marco Geisler; Andreas Hajek; Marko Schwalbe; André Willms	6:11.62	Argentina; Santiago Fernández; Sergio Fernández González; Rubén Knulst; Guillermo Pfaab	6:12.62
M2+	Italy; Giuliano De Stabile; Luca Sartori; Antonio Cirillo	7:35.11	France; Antoine Béghin; Laurent Béghin; Christophe Lattaignant	7:37.97	Belgium; Frank Moortgat; Dominique Verdeyen; Benoit Ollemans	7:41.21
M2-	Great Britain; Matthew Pinsent; Steve Redgrave	6:28.11	Australia; Robert Walker; Richard Wearne	6:29.87	France; Michel Andrieux; Jean-Christophe Rolland	6:30.63
M4+	United States; Chris Ahrens; Porter Collins; Ben Holbrook; Scott Munn; Peter Cipollone	6:37.50	New Zealand; Murdoch Dryden; Andrew Matheson; Chris McAsey; Chris White; Michael Whittaker	6:38.65	Italy; Lorenzo Carboncini; Luca Cavallini; Ciro Liguori; Rocco Pecoraro; Vincenzo Di Palma	6:40.14
M4-	Italy; Riccardo Dei Rossi; Raffaello Leonardo; Valter Molea; Carlo Mornati	5:58.28	Great Britain; Tim Foster; Rupert Obholzer; Greg Searle; Jonny Searle	5:58.89	Poland; Piotr Basta; Wojciech Jankowski; Maciej Łasicki; Jacek Streich	6:02.13
M8+	Germany; Roland Baar; Stefan Forster; Detlef Kirchhoff; Ike Landvoigt; Jochen Lerche; Frank Richter; Dieter Sator; Marc Weber; Peter Thiede	5:53.40	Netherlands; Michiel Bartman; Kai Compagner; Nico Rienks; Niels van der Zwan; Jaap Krijtenburg; Niels van Steenis; Henk-Jan Zwolle; Ronald Florijn; Jeroen Duyster	5:55.54	United States; Jon Brown; Sean Hall; Fredric Honebein; Robert Kaehler; Jeffrey Klepacki; Jamie Koven; Michael Peterson; Don Smith; Steven Segaloff	5:57.46
Men's lightweight events
LM1x	Great Britain; Peter Haining	7:29.78	Czech Republic; Tomáš Kacovský	7:31.60	Denmark; Anders Brems	7:33.24
LM2x	Switzerland; Markus Gier; Michael Gier	6:45.56	Sweden; Anders Christensson; Mattias Tichy	6:46.83	Australia; Anthony Edwards; Bruce Hick	6:47.60
LM4x	Austria; Gernot Faderbauer; Walter Rantasa; Christoph Schmölzer; Wolfgang Sigl	6:09.32	Germany; Frank Günder; Andreas Lutz; Bernhard Rühling; Jens Weckbach	6:11.07	Italy; Lorenzo Bertini; Paolo Pittino; Franco Sancassani; Massimo Guglielmi	6:13.71
LM2-	Italy; Carlo Grande; Pasquale Marigliano	7:08.64	France; Sebastien Bel; Xavier Dorfman	7:11.77	Denmark; Thomas Ebert; Bo Helleberg	7:13.96
LM4-	Italy; Carlo Gaddi; Leonardo Pettinari; Andrea Re; Ivano Zasio	6:16.46	Denmark; Eskild Ebbesen; Victor Feddersen; Niels Henriksen; Thomas Poulsen	6:17.83	Germany; Michael Buchheit; Oliver Rau; Bernhard Stomporowski; Martin Weiß	6:18.44
LM8+	Denmark; Johnny Bo Andersen; Torben Bech Jensen; Thomas Croft Buck; Carsten Glud; Søren Henrichsen; Jeppe Jensen Kollat; Michael Jensen; Bo Vestergaard; Dennis Larsen	5:53.45	Great Britain; Christopher Bates; Andy Butt; Niall Gardam; Ben Helm; Dave Lemon; Jim McNiven; Nicholas Strange; Jon Williamson; John Deakin	5:55.70	Italy; Salvatore Amitrano; Enrico Barbaranelli; Sabino Bellomo; Danilo Fraquelli; Stefano Fraquelli; Fabrizio Ravasi; Roberto Romanini; Carmine Somma; Gaetano Iannuzzi	5:58.77

=== Women's events ===
Event	Gold	Time	Silver	Time	Bronze	Time
W1x	Sweden; Maria Brandin	7:26.00	Canada; Silken Laumann	7:29.07	Belgium; Annelies Bredael	7:34.29
W2x	Canada; Kathleen Heddle; Marnie McBean	6:55.76	Netherlands; Eeke van Nes; Irene Eijs	6:55.84	New Zealand; Philippa Baker; Brenda Lawson	6:59.43
W4x	Germany; Kerstin Köppen; Katrin Rutschow; Jana Sorgers; Jana Thieme	6:40.80	Canada; Laryssa Biesenthal; Kathleen Heddle; Marnie McBean; Diane O'Grady	6:43.02	Netherlands; Nelleke Penninx; Eeke van Nes; Anita Meiland; Irene Eijs	6:43.22
W2-	Australia; Kate Slatter; Megan Still	7:12.70	United States; Karen Kraft; Missy Schwen-Ryan	7:14.90	France; Celine Garcia; Christine Gossé	7:16.49
W4-	United States; Cindy Brooks; Melissa Iverson; Lianne Nelson; Katherine Scanlon Lewis	7:03.53	Germany; Gerte John; Doreen Martin; Dana Pyritz; Anke Weiler	7:05.13	Belarus; Tamara Davydenko; Irina Gribko; Nataliya Stasyuk; Marina Znak	7:07.98
W8+	United States; Jennifer Dore; Catriona Fallon; Amy Fuller; Anne Kakela; Laurel Korholz; Elizabeth McCagg; Mary McCagg; Monica Tranel-Michini; Yasmin Farooq	6:50.73	Romania; Angela Alupei; Iulia Bobeică; Veronica Cochela; Doina Ignat; Ioana Olteanu; Dobrita Preda; Doina Spîrcu; Anca Tănase; Cristina Ilie	6:52.76	Netherlands; Tessa Appeldoorn; Femke Boelen; Anneke Venema; Marieke Westerhof; Muriel van Schilfgaarde; Meike van Driel; Tessa Knaven; Rita de Jong; Jissy de Wolf	6:54.25
Women's lightweight events
LW1x	Australia; Rebecca Joyce	8:14.66	France; Catherine Mueller	8:16.31	Netherlands; Annette Bogstra	8:18.61
LW2x	Canada; Colleen Miller; Wendy Wiebe	7:26.45	Denmark; Lene Andersson; Berit Christoffersen	7:27.28	Germany; Michelle Darvill; Ruth Kaps	7:29.60
LW2-	United States; Christine Collins; Ellen Minzner	7:55.99	Great Britain; Alison Brownless; Jane Hall	7:59.17	Denmark; Kristine Jørgensen; Sharon Thilgreen	8:02.58
LW4-	United States; Barbara Byrne; Linda Muri; Whitney Post; Sarah Simmons	7:08.48	Great Britain; Juliet Machan; Robyn Morris; Jo Nitsch; Rachel Woolf	7:09.74	Germany; Janet Radünzel; Gunda Reimers; Jutta Schausten; Gaby Schulz	7:13.91

== Medal table ==
Place	Nation	1st place, gold medalist(s)	2nd place, silver medalist(s)	3rd place, bronze medalist(s)	Total
1	United States	5	1	1	7
2	Italy	5		3	8
3	Germany	2	4	3	9
4	Great Britain	2	4		6
5	Denmark	2	2	3	7
6	Canada	2	2		4
7	Australia	2	1	1	4
8	Sweden	1	1		2
9	Austria	1			1
9	Slovenia	1			1
9	Switzerland	1			1
12	France		3	2	5
13	Netherlands		2	3	5
14	Czech Republic		1	1	2
14	New Zealand		1	1	2
16	Estonia		1		1
16	Romania		1		1
18	Belgium			2	2
19	Argentina			1	1
19	Belarus			1	1
19	Norway			1	1
19	Poland			1	1
Total		24	24	24	72
