= 1992 World Rowing Championships =

International rowing event

- Venue: Notre Dame Island
- Location: Montreal, Quebec, Canada
- Dates: 13 to 16 August

The 1992 World Rowing Championships were World Rowing Championships that were held from 13 to 16 August 1992 in Montreal, Quebec, Canada. Since 1992 was an Olympic year for rowing, the World Championships did not include Olympic events scheduled for the 1992 Summer Olympics.

== Medal summary ==
Medalists at the 1992 World Rowing Championships were:

=== Men's lightweight events ===
Event:	Gold:	Time	Silver:	Time	Bronze:	Time
LM1x	Denmark; Jens Mohr Ernst	7:08.79	Netherlands; Pepijn Aardewijn	7:10.21	United States; Brian Sweenor	7:14.63
LM2x	Australia; Gary Lynagh; Bruce Hick	6:24.68	Austria; Walter Rantasa; Christoph Schmölzer	6:26.23	Switzerland; Markus Gier; Michael Gier	6:28.86
LM4-	Great Britain; Christopher Bates; Toby Hessian; Tom Kay; Carl Smith	6:03.98	Italy; Sabino Bellomo; Franco Cattaneo; Danilo Fraquelli; Alfredo Striani	6:05.69	France; Sébastien Bel; Stéphane Guérinot; Benoît Masson; José Oyarzabal	6:07.48
LM4x	Italy; Michelangelo Crispi; Francesco Esposito; Massimo Lana; Massimo Guglielmi	5:54.38	Sweden; Joakim Brischewski; Bo Ekros; Lars-Johan Flodin; Per Lundberg	5:56.31	Germany; Stephan Fahrig; Klaus Götte; Rene Höhn; Bernhard Rühling	5:57.60
LM8+	Denmark; Johnny Bo Andersen; Svend Blitskov; Thomas Croft Buck; Jan Hansen; Jeppe Jensen Kollat; Flemming Meyer; Thomas Poulsen; Bo Vestergaard; Martin Sorensen (cox)	5:34.95	Great Britain; Andy Butt; Roger Everington; Jim Hartland; Jim McNiven; Mark Partridge; Nicholas Strange; Ian Watson; Stephen Wright; Philip Cox (cox)	5:37.02	Germany; Klaus Altena; Michael Buchheit; Christian Dahlke; Michael Kobor; Thomas Melges; Bernhard Stomporowski; Kai von Warburg; Uwe Maerz; Olaf Kaska (cox)	5:37.95

=== Women's lightweight events ===
Event:	Gold:	Time	Silver:	Time	Bronze:	Time
LW1x	Denmark; Mette Bloch Jensen	8:11.62	Great Britain; Sue Key	8:17.37	Canada; Wendy Wiebe	8:21.75
LW2x	Germany; Claudia Waldi; Christiane Weber	7:27.29	Canada; Michelle Darvill; Colleen Miller	7:28.04	United States; Sanya Remmler-Suddeth; Teresa Zarzeczny	7:29.70
LW4-	Australia; Marina Cade; Deirdre Fraser; Virginia Lee; Liz Moller	7:01.40	Great Britain; Alison Brownless; Anna Marie Dryden; Tonia Williams; Claire Davies	7:03.78	Canada; Jill Blois; Nori Doobenen; Laurie Featherstone; Renata Troc	7:08.30
