= Doerksen =

Doerksen is a surname. Notable people with the surname include:

- Arno Doerksen (born 1958), Canadian politician and current Member of the Legislative Assembly of Alberta
- Brian Doerksen (born 1965), Canadian Christian singer-songwriter and worship leader from Abbotsford, British Columbia
- Heather Doerksen (born 1980), Canadian actress who has appeared on stage and screen
- Joe Doerksen (born 1977), Canadian mixed martial artist from New Bothwell, Manitoba
- Victor Doerksen (born 1953), politician, accountant and former cabinet minister in Alberta, Canada

== See also ==
- Derksen
- Dirksen (disambiguation)
- Drochtersen
