= Audisio =

Audisio is an Italian surname. Notable people with the surname include:

- Guglielmo Audisio (1802–1882), Italian Catholic priest and writer
- Marco Audisio (born 1975), Italian rower
- Tommaso Audisio (1789–1845), Italian Catholic priest and amateur architect
- Walter Audisio (1909–1973), Italian politician
