= Li Fei (rower) =

Chinese rower

Personal information
- Born: 14 January 1973 (age 53)
- Height: 180 cm (5 ft 11 in)
- Weight: 75 kg (165 lb)

Sport
- Sport: Rowing
Medal record
Women's rowing
Representing China
World Rowing Championships
Bronze medal – third place	1994 Indianapolis	LW4-
Silver medal – second place	1993 Račice	LW2x
Gold medal – first place	1991 Vienna	LW4-

Li Fei (born 14 January 1973) is a Chinese rower.

Li was born in 1973 in China. At the 1991 World Rowing Championships, she won gold with the lightweight women's four. At the 1992 World Rowing Championships, she came ninth in the lightweight women's double sculls. At the 1993 World Rowing Championships, she won a silver medal in the lightweight women's double sculls. At the 1994 World Rowing Championships, she won bronze with the lightweight women's four. She competed in lightweight single sculls in the 1995 World Rowing Championships and came twelfth. She then went to the 1996 Summer Olympics in Atlanta, USA, where she competed in the women's lightweight double sculls, where she came ninth partnered with Ou Shaoyan.
