= Gier =

Gier may refer to:

- Gier (river), a river in France
- Aqueduct of the Gier, an ancient Roman aqueduct
- Greed (Jelinek novel) or Gier, a 2000 novel by Elfriede Jelinek
- GIER, a 1961 computer made by Regnecentralen

== People with the surname ==
- Jack de Gier (born 1968), Dutch football player
- Kerstin Gier (born 1966), German author
- Markus Gier (born 1970), Swiss rower
- Michael Gier (born 1967), Swiss rower
- Rob Gier (born 1981), English–Filipino football player
