= Michael Jensen =

Michael Jensen may refer to:

- Michael C. Jensen (1939–2024), American economist
- Michael K. Jensen, American mechanical engineer
- Michael Jensen (theologian) (born 1970), Australian theologian
- Michael Jensen (rower), Danish lightweight rower
- Michael Jensen (racing driver) (born 1975), Danish racing driver
- Michael Jepsen Jensen (born 1992), Danish speedway rider
- Michael Aastrup Jensen (born 1976), Danish politician
- Michael Westergård Jensen (1916–1944), merchant and member of the Danish resistance

== See also ==
- Mike Jensen (born 1988), Danish footballer
- Mike Jensen (internet pioneer), Member of the Internet Hall of Fame
