= 1996 World Rowing Championships =

International rowing event

- Venue: Strathclyde Country Park
- Location: Motherwell, Strathclyde, United Kingdom
- Dates: 11 August

The 1996 World Rowing Championships were World Rowing Championships that were held on 11 August 1996 in conjunction with the World Junior Rowing Championships in Motherwell, North Lanarkshire, Scotland, United Kingdom. The event took place at Strathclyde Country Park. Since 1996 was an Olympic year for rowing, the World Championships did not include Olympic events scheduled for the 1996 Summer Olympics.

== Medal summary ==
=== Men's events ===
Event	Gold	Time	Silver	Time	Bronze	Time
M4+	Romania; Dorin Alupei; Gabriel Marin; Iulică Ruican; Viorel Talapan; Alexei Raducanu (c)	6:25.74	Czech Republic; Dusan Businsky; Michal Dalecký; Pavel Malinsky; Lubomir Skalicky; Oldřich Hejdušek (c)	6:26.76	Russia; Vladimir Andreyev; Aleksandr Litvinchev; Gennadiy Mulitsa; Evgeniy Ovtcharov; Aleksey Mitienko (c)	6:28.17
M2+	France; Luc Prévot; Yannick Schulte; Christophe Tellier (c)	7:18.26	Romania; Dimitrie Popescu; Nicolae Țaga; Dumitru Răducanu (c)	7:18.96	Netherlands; Remco Schnieders; Leofwin Visman; Chun Wei Cheung (c)	7:22.33
Men's lightweight events
LM1x	Denmark; Karsten Nielsen	7:35.72	Czech Republic; Tomáš Kacovský	7:36.01	Finland; Heikki Haavikko	7:37.15
LM4x	Italy; Lorenzo Bertini; Paolo Pittino; Franco Sancassani; Massimo Guglielmi	06:10.11	Germany; Oliver Ibielski; Alexander Lutz; Andreas Lutz; Frank Mager	6:11.53	France; Frederic Ceresoli; Frédéric Dufour; Thierry Richard; Pascal Touron	6:11.82
LM2-	Denmark; Thomas Ebert; Bo Helleberg	7:06.34	Ireland; Neville Maxwell; Tony O'Connor	7:09.25	Germany; Tobias Müller; Oliver Rau	7:10.73
LM8+	Germany; Andreas Bech; Matthias Edeler; Dirk Jenny; Stefan Locher; Marcus Mielke; Teja Töpfer; Vladimir Vukelic; Uwe Maerz; Klaus Klotz (c)	5:55.06	Denmark; Jens Christensen; Thomas Croft Buck; Wilhelm Drexel Jorn Hamdorf; Morten Hansen Skov; Søren Henrichsen; Jeppe Jensen Kollat; Michael Jensen; Dennis Larsen (c)	5:56.96	Canada; Jon Beare; Ross Beattie; Chris Davidson; Len Diplock; Graham Mclaren; Ben Storey; Bryan Thompson; Edward Winchester; Chris Taylor (c)	5:59.47

=== Women's events ===
Event	Gold	Time	Silver	Time	Bronze	Time
W4-	United States; Emily Dirksen; Sara Field; Amy Turner; Rosana Zegarra	6:49.48	Romania; Liliana Gafencu; Doina Ignat; Elisabeta Lipă; Marioara Ciobanu-Popescu	6:51.36	Germany; Claudia Barth; Gerte John; Doreen Martin; Lenka Wech	6:55.15
Women's lightweight events
LW1x	Romania; Constanța Burcică	8:06.90	France; Benedicte Dorfman - Luzuy	8:07.66	United States; Sarah Garner	8:09.74
LW2-	United States; Christine Smith-Collins; Ellen Minzner	7:56.66	Great Britain; Alison Brownless; Jane Hall	8:02.71	Romania; Camelia Macoviciuc; Maria Sava	8:03.31
LW4-	China; Liu Bili; Liu Mei Ling; Wang Fang; Zhong Aifang	7:08.56	Great Britain; Patricia Corless; Robyn Morris; Malindi Myers; Jo Nitsch	7:09.55	United States; Kari Green; Julie McCleery; Whitney Post; Sarah Simmons	7:11.10

== Medal table ==
Place	Nation	1st place, gold medalist(s)	2nd place, silver medalist(s)	3rd place, bronze medalist(s)	Total
1	Romania	2	2	1	5
2	Denmark	2	1	0	3
3	United States	2	0	1	3
4	Germany	1	1	2	4
5	France	1	1	1	3
6	Italy	1	0	0	1
7	Czech Republic	0	2	0	2
8	Ireland	0	1	0	1
8	Great Britain	0	1	0	1
10	Canada	0	0	1	1
10	Finland	0	0	1	1
10	Netherlands	0	0	1	1
10	Russia	0	0	1	1
Total		9	9	9	27
