= Jan Hansen =

Jan Hansen may refer to:

- Jan Hansen (curler) (born 1957), Danish curler
- Jan Hansen (footballer) (born 1955), Norwegian footballer
- Jan Hansen (rower) (born 1970), Danish lightweight rower
- Jan Vang Sørensen (née Hansen, born 1960), retired Danish football player turned professional poker player
- Jan Knobelauch Hansen (born 1971), Danish athlete
