= Sara Field =

Sara Field may refer to:

- Sara Bard Field (1882–1974), American poet and suffragist
- Sara Field (rower) (born 1969), American rower
