= Torben Jensen =

Torben Jensen may refer to:

- Torben Alstrup Jensen, Danish field hockey player
- Torben Bech Jensen, Danish rower
- Torben Jensen, chairman and principal shareholder of the defunct venture capitalist firm Hellerup Finans
