= Amy Turner =

Amy Turner may refer to:

- Amy Turner (rugby, born March 1984), New Zealand-born semi-professional Australian rugby league and rugby union player
- Amy Turner (rugby union, born July 1984), English rugby union player
- Amy James-Turner (born 1991), English association footballer
- Amy Turner (rower), American rower
