= 1997 World Rowing Championships =

International rowing event

- Venue: Lac d'Aiguebelette
- Location: Aiguebelette-le-Lac, France
- Dates: 31 August to 7 September

The 1997 World Rowing Championships were World Rowing Championships that were held from 31 August to 7 September 1997 at the Lac d'Aiguebelette, France. The annual week-long rowing regatta was organized by FISA (the International Rowing Federation), and held at the end of the northern hemisphere summer. In non-Olympic years it is the highlight of the international rowing calendar.

== Medal summary ==
=== Men's events ===
Event	Gold	Time	Silver	Time	Bronze	Time
M1x	United States; Jamie Koven	6:44.86	Germany; André Willms	6:47.49	Great Britain; Greg Searle	6:47.57
M2x	Germany; Andreas Hajek; Stephan Volkert	6:13.35	Norway; Steffen Størseth; Kjetil Undset	6:14.98	Australia; Duncan Free; Marcus Free	6:16.05
M4x	Italy; Agostino Abbagnale; Giovanni Calabrese; Alessandro Corona; Rossano Galtarossa	5:42.50	Germany; Jens Burow; Marco Geisler; Marcel Hacker; Stefan Röhnert	5:45.88	Ukraine; Oleh Lykov; Oleksandr Marchenko; Leonid Shaposhnikov; Oleksandr Zaskalko	5:46.11
M2+	United States; Nicholas Anderson; Scott Fentress; Jordan Irving (c)	6:56.30	Australia; David Cameron; Nick McDonald-Crowley; David Colvin (c)	6:56.36	Greece; Georgios Fotou; Konstantinos Kariotis; Lampros Rizos (c)	6:57.62
M2-	France; Michel Andrieux; Jean-Christophe Rolland	6:27.69	Italy; Lorenzo Carboncini; Mattia Trombetta	6:31.51	United States; Adam Holland; Edward Murphy	6:32.10
M4-	Great Britain; James Cracknell; Tim Foster; Matthew Pinsent; Steve Redgrave	5:52.40	France; Gilles Bosquet; Daniel Fauché; Olivier Moncelet; Bertrand Vecten	5:56.34	Romania; Dorin Alupei; Gabriel Marin; Cornel Nemțoc; Florian Tudor	5:57.10
M4+	France; Antoine Béghin; Vincent Maliszewski; Bernard Roche; Laurent Béghin; Christophe Lattaignant (cox)	6:04.17	Italy; Giuliano De Stabile; Rosario Gioia; Francesco Mattei; Mario Palmisano; Gaetano Iannuzzi (cox)	6:05.98	Great Britain; Ed Coode; Mark Johnson; Garry McAdams; Steve Trapmore; David Chung (cox)	6:09.80
M8+	United States; Chris Ahrens; Sebastian Bea; Phil Henry; Robert Kaehler; Garrett Miller; Timothy Richter; Michael Wherley; Robert Cummins; Peter Cipollone (c)	5:27.20	Romania; Valentin Robu; Florin Corbeanu; Viorel Talapan; Florian Tudor; Gabriel Marin; Andrei Bănică; Cornel Nemțoc; Dorin Alupei; Marin Gheorghe (c)	5:27.76	Australia; Robert Walker; Geoff Stewart; Alastair Gordon; David Porzig; James Stewart; Daniel Burke; Drew Ginn; Richard Wearne; David Colvin	5:28.14
Men's lightweight events
LM1x	Denmark; Karsten Nielsen	6:57.16	Switzerland; Michael Bänninger	6:59.62	Czech Republic; Tomáš Kacovský	7:00.92
LM2x	Poland; Tomasz Kucharski; Robert Sycz	6:14.57	Italy; Michelangelo Crispi; Leonardo Pettinari	6:15.98	Germany; Ingo Euler; Bernhard Rühling	6:18.38
LM2-	Switzerland; Mathias Binder; Beni Schmidt	6:32.81	Ireland; Neville Maxwell; Tony O'Connor	6:33.51	Denmark; Jeppe Jensen Kollat; Jakob Øjvind Nielsen	6:34.11
LM4x	Italy; Stefano Basalini; Paolo Pittino; Franco Sancassani; Massimo Guglielmi	5:50.68	Germany; Markus Baumann; Oliver Ibielski; Alexander Lutz; Frank Mager	5:52.90	Ireland; John Armstrong; Neal Byrne; Brendan Dolan; Emmet O'Brien	5:55.04
LM4-	Denmark; Thomas Ebert; Thomas Poulsen; Eskild Ebbesen; Victor Feddersen	5:54.35	France; Xavier Dorfman; Frederic Pinon; Yves Hocdé; Laurent Porchier	5:54.91	Germany; Martin Weis; Marcus Mielke; Jan Herzog; Roland Haendle	5:57.87
LM8+	Australia; Darren Balmforth; Jon Berney; Simon Burgess; Alastair Isherwood; Rob Mitchell; Bob Richards; Michael Wiseman; Tim Wright; Brett Hayman (c)	5:40.00	Great Britain; Phil Baker; James Brown; Jim Hartland; Alex Henshilwood; Jason Keys; Dave Lemon; Jim Mcniven; Ben Webb; John Deakin (c)	5:40.03	Canada; Jon Beare; Chris Davidson; Jeff Lay; Graham Mclaren; Anthony Shearing; Ben Storey; Bryan Thompson; Edward Winchester; Chris Taylor (c)	5:40.91

=== Women's events ===
Event:	Gold:	Time	Silver:	Time	Bronze:	Time
W1x	Belarus; Ekaterina Karsten-Khodotovitch	7:29.30	Denmark; Trine Hansen	7:30.73	Sweden; Maria Brandin	7:31.39
W2x	Germany; Kathrin Boron; Meike Evers	6:51.07	Great Britain; Miriam Batten; Gillian Lindsay	6:48.82	Romania; Liliana Gafencu; Viorica Susanu	6:50.16
W4x	Germany; Kathrin Boron; Kerstin Köppen; Manuela Lutze; Jana Thieme	6:16.15	Denmark; Ulla Hansen Werner; Sarah Lauritzen; Dorthe Pedersen; Stinne Petersen	6:19.35	Ukraine; Inna Frolova; Svitlana Maziy; Dina Miftakhutdinova; Olena Morozova-Ronzhina	6:20.16
W2-	Canada; Alison Korn; Emma Robinson	7:08.09	Romania; Veronica Cochela; Georgeta Damian	7:14.77	Russia; Albina Ligatcheva; Vera Pochitaeva	7:17.10
W4-	Great Britain; Alex Beever; Lisa Eyre; Elizabeth Henshilwood; Sue Walker	6:40.30	Romania; Doina Ignat; Ioana Olteanu; Doina Spîrcu; Anca Tănase	6:41.13	Germany; Anna Coenen; Pia Coenen; Kristina Erbe; Elke Hipler	6:45.70
W8+	Romania; Georgeta Damian; Viorica Susanu; Ioana Olteanu; Angela Cazac; Liliana Gafencu; Veronica Cochela; Doina Ignat; Anca Tănase; Elena Georgescu (c)	6:02.40	Canada; Buffy-Lynne Williams-Alexander; Laryssa Biesenthal; Jessica Gonin; Alison Korn; Emma Robinson; Dorota Urbaniak; Kristen Wall; Kubet Weston; Lesley Thompson-Willie (c)	6:07.18	Great Britain; Alex Beever; Lisa Eyre; Katherine Grainger; Elizabeth Henshilwood; Elise Laverick; Sue Walker; Rachel Woolf; Francesca Zino; Suzie Ellis (c)	6:10.00
Women's lightweight events
LW1x	United States; Sarah Garner	7:38.39	France; Bénédicte Dorfman-Luzuy	7:42.48	Sweden; Kristina Knejp Christensson	7:46.98
LW2x	Germany; Angelika Brand; Michelle Darvill	7:00.93	Denmark; Lene Andersson; Anna Helleberg	7:01.77	Romania; Angela Alupei; Camelia Macoviciuc	7:03.86
LW2-	Australia; Eliza Blair; Justine Joyce	7:18.32	United States; Michelle Borkhuis; Linda Muri	7:20.34	Great Britain; Caroline Hobson; Malindi Myers	7:23.97
LW4x	Germany; Christiane Brand; Nicole Faust; Christine Morawitz; Gunda Reimers	6:36.63	Canada; Nathalie Benzing; Brie Ellard; Renata Troc; Samara Walbohm	6:37.16	Netherlands; Hedi Poot; Brechtje van Eijck; Sigrid Winkelhuis; Floortje van Eijck	6:39.38

== Medal table ==
Place	Nation	1st place, gold medalist(s)	2nd place, silver medalist(s)	3rd place, bronze medalist(s)	Total
1	Germany	5	3	2	10
2	United States	4	1	1	6
3	Great Britain	2	2	3	7
4	Italy	2	2	0	4
5	Australia	2	1	2	5
6	Romania	1	3	3	7
7	Denmark	1	3	1	5
8	Canada	1	2	1	4
9	France	1	2	0	3
10	Switzerland	1	1	0	2
11	Belarus	1	0	0	1
11	Poland	1	0	0	1
13	Ireland	0	1	1	2
14	Norway	0	1	0	1
15	Sweden	0	0	2	2
15	Ukraine	0	0	2	2
17	Czech Republic	0	0	1	1
17	Greece	0	0	1	1
17	Netherlands	0	0	1	1
17	Russia	0	0	1	1
Total		22	22	22	66
