= Rob Mitchell (rower) =

Australian rower (born 1976)

Personal information
- Born: 8 May 1976 (age 50)

Sport
- Sport: Rowing
- Club: UTS Haberfield Rowing Club
Medal record
Men's rowing
Representing Australia
World Rowing Championships
Gold medal – first place	1997 Aiguebelette	Lwt eight
World Rowing U23 Championships
Gold medal – first place	1996 Hazewinkel	LM4-
Bronze medal – third place	1995 Groningen	LM2X

Rob Mitchell (born 8 May 1976) is an Australian former lightweight rower. He was a 1997 world champion and twice an Australian national champion. He won gold at the 1997 World Rowing Championships in Aiguebelette in the lightweight men's eight.

== Club and state rowing ==
Mitchell's senior club rowing was from the UTS Haberfield Rowing Club in Sydney.

Mitchell rowed in New South Wales representative men's lightweight fours contesting the Penrith Cup at the Interstate Regatta within the Australian Rowing Championships from 1997 to 2000. Those crews were victorious in 1997 and 1998 .

== International representative rowing ==
Mitchell first represented Australia aged 19 in the lightweight double scull at the 1995 World Rowing U23 Championships at Groningen in The Netherlands where the Australians took the bronze medal. Then at the 1996 World Rowing U23 Championships in Hazewinkel, he rowed at three in the lightweight coxless four to a gold medal victory.

In 1997 he made his debut in an Australian senior crew – the Lyall McCarthy coached men's lightweight eight. At the 1997 World Rowing Championships in Aiguebelette, Mitchell rowed at seven behind his New South Wales and U23 team-mate Michael Wiseman to a thrilling final victory by 0.03 seconds with only 1.5 lengths separating the field. Mitchell won his first and only World Championship title. At the 1999 World Championships in St Catharines Canada, Mitchell rowed a lightweight coxless pair with Wiseman to a seventh-place finish.

In 2002 in a crew with the veteran Tasmanian lightweight Simon Burgess, Mitchell raced in the coxless four at a World Rowing Cup in Munich and at the 2002 World Rowing Championships in Seville to a fourth placing. His final Australian representative selection was in the coxless four which competed at Milan 2003 and placed seventh.
