= 2021 Læsø municipal election =

← 2017	16 November 2021	2025 →

All 9 seats to the Læsø Municipal Council 5 seats needed for a majority
- Turnout: 33,065 (80.8%) ▼1.5pp
	First party	Second party	Third party
	V	C	H
Party	Venstre	Conservatives	Læsø Borgerliste
Last election	4 seats, 37.1%	0 seats, 5.2%	Did not stand
Seats won	3	2	2
Seat change	▼1	▲2	▲2
Popular vote	307	290	261
Percentage	25.3%	23.9%	21.5%
Swing	▼11.8%	▲18.7%	New
	Fourth party	Fifth party
	A	O
Party	Social Democrats	Danish People's Party
Last election	1 seat, 8.7%	2 seats, 22.5%
Seats won	1	1
Seat change	0	▼1
Popular vote	200	97
Percentage	16.5%	8.0%
Swing	▲7.8%	▼14.5%
Mayor before election
Karsten Nielsen
Venstre
Mayor after election
Tobias Birch Johansen
Venstre

In 2018, following the 2017 Læsø Municipal election, Danish People's Party and the Social Democrats (Denmark) reached an agreement for a constitution that would see Karsten Nielsen, from Danish People's Party become the first mayor in a Danish municipality, in the party's history. On June 4, 2021, Karsten Nielsen announced he would switch his party affiliation to centre-right Venstre. Later on 9 October 2021, he announced he would not stand to be re-elected for mayor. Instead deputy mayor, Tobias Birch, would be the main candidate of Venstre.

== Electoral system ==
For elections to Danish municipalities, a number varying from 9 to 31 are chosen to be elected to the municipal council. The seats are then allocated using the D'Hondt method and a closed list proportional representation. Læsø Municipality had 9 seats in 2021

Unlike in Danish General Elections, in elections to municipal councils, electoral alliances are allowed.

== Electoral alliances ==
=== Electoral Alliance 1 ===
Party		Political alignment
D	New Right	Right-wing to Far-right
V	Venstre	Centre-right

=== Electoral Alliance 2 ===
Party		Political alignment
C	Conservatives	Centre-right
O	Danish People's Party	Right-wing to Far-right

== Results by polling station ==
Polling Station	A	C	D	O	V	H
Polling Station	%	%	%	%	%	%
Læsø	16.5	23.9	4.7	8.0	25.3	21.5

== Results ==
Party		Votes	%	+/-	Seats	+/-
Læsø Municipality
V	Venstre	307	25.33	-11.76	3	-1
C	Conservatives	290	23.93	+18.68	2	+2
H	Læsø Borgerliste	261	21.53	New	2	New
A	Social Democrats	200	16.50	+7.82	1	0
O	Danish People's Party	97	8.00	-14.53	1	-1
D	New Right	57	4.70	New	0	New
Total		1,212	100	N/A	9	N/A
Invalid votes		13	0.84	+0.65		
Blank votes		24	1.55	+1.30		
Turnout		1,249	80.79	-1.55		
Source: valg.dk
