= Wdowiak =

Wdowiak is a Polish surname. Notable people with the surname include:

- Grzegorz Wdowiak (born 1970), Polish rower
- Mateusz Wdowiak (born 1996), Polish footballer
