= Sue Walker =

Sue Walker may refer to:

- Sue Walker (politician) (born 1951), British-Australian politician
- Sue Walker (rower) (born 1967), British rower
- Sue Brannan Walker (born 1940), American poet

== Fictional characters ==
- Sue Walker, a fictional character on the television series In the Flesh

== See also ==
- Susan Walker (disambiguation)
