= Zegarra =

Zegarra is a surname. Notable people with the surname include:

- Dimas Zegarra (1932–2023), Peruvian footballer
- Víctor Zegarra (born 1940), Peruvian footballer and manager
- Nicolás Fuentes (1941–2015), full name Domingo Nicolás Fuentes Zegarra, Peruvian footballer
- Andrés Zegarra (born 1947), Peruvian footballer
- Dina Ercilia Boluarte Zegarra (born 1962), the 64th president of Peru
- Ricardo Zegarra (born 1966), Peruvian footballer
- Pablo Zegarra (born 1973), Peruvian footballer and manager
- Carlos Zegarra (footballer) (born 1977), Peruvian footballer
- Rosana Zegarra, American rower
