= Michelle Darvill =

Canadian-German rower

Personal information
- Born: Michelle Denise Darvill; 21 August 1965 (age 61) Toronto, Ontario, Canada
- Height: 172 cm (5 ft 8 in)
- Weight: 59 kg (130 lb)

Sport
- Sport: Rowing
Medal record
Representing Canada
World Rowing Championships
Gold medal – first place	1993 Račice	LW1x
Silver medal – second place	1992 Montreal	LW2x
Summer Universiade
Gold medal – first place	1993 Buffalo	W4x
Representing Germany
World Rowing Championships
Gold medal – first place	1997 Aiguebelette	LW2x
Gold medal – first place	2000 Zagreb	LW4x
Bronze medal – third place	1995 Tampere	LW2x

Michelle Denise Darvill (born 21 August 1965) is a retired rower. Born in Toronto, she first competed for Canada, but later change allegiance to Germany. She was world champion in three different lightweight boat classes, once for Canada and twice for Germany, and represented Germany at the 1996 Summer Olympics. Since 2009, she has been coaching the Canadian under 23 women's team.

== Early life ==
Darvill was born in 1965 in Toronto, Ontario, Canada, and grew up in Mississauga. In her youth, she was a competitive swimmer. She took up rowing when she was at university as a social activity.

== Rowing for Canada ==
At the 1991 World Rowing Championships, she came fourth in the lightweight women's double sculls for Canada. At the 1992 World Rowing Championships, she won silver in the same event. At the 1993 World Rowing Championships, she won gold in the lightweight women's single sculls. At the 1994 World Rowing Championships, she came fifth in the same event.

== Rowing for Germany ==
As a holder of dual citizenship, Darvill competed for Germany from 1995. At the 1995 World Rowing Championships, she won bronze in the lightweight women's double sculls, partnering with Ruth Kaps. Kaps and Darvill competed at the 1996 Summer Olympics in the same event and came eighth. Partnering with Angelika Brand, they became lightweight women's double sculls world champions in 1997. At the 2000 World Rowing Championships, she competed in the lightweight women's quadruple sculls and became world champion. She retired from competitive rowing after the 2000 season.

== Post-competitive rowing career ==
Since 2009, she has been the lead coach for Canada's under 23 women's team.
