= Cindy Brooks =

Cindy Brooks may refer to:

- Cindy Brooks (model) (born 1951), American model and actress
- Cindy Brooks (rower) (born 1965), American rower
