= Soberano (disambiguation) =

El Soberano is a Mexican luchador enmascarado or masked professional wrestler.

Soberano, meaning sovereign, may also refer to:

- Liza Soberano (born 1998), Filipino-American actress and model
- Soberano Awards, Dominican music awards
- Venezuelan bolívar soberano, the current banknote category in Venezuela

== See also ==
- La Soberana (or Casandra Damirón; 1919–1983), Dominican singer, dancer and folklorist
- Soberanes, a surname
