= Phil Henry =

Phil Henry may refer to:

- Philip Henry (1631–1696), English Nonconformist clergyman and diarist
- Phil Henry (rower) (born 1971), American rower
- Phillip Henry of Edgelarks, an English folk music duo
