= Ioannis Kourkourikis =

Greek rower (born 1971)

Personal information
- Nationality: Greek
- Born: 5 March 1971 (age 54); Giannitsa, Greece

Sport
- Sport: Rowing

Ioannis Kourkourikis (born 5 March 1971) is a Greek rower. He competed in the men's lightweight double sculls event at the 1996 Summer Olympics.
