= Maarten van der Linden =

Dutch rower

Personal information
- Born: 9 March 1969 (age 57)
Medal record
Men's rowing
Representing the Netherlands
Olympic Games
Silver medal – second place	1996	Lightweight double sculls

Everwijn Johan Maarten van der Linden (born 9 March 1969 in Voorburg, South Holland) is a former rower from the Netherlands, who competed for his native country in two consecutive Summer Olympics, starting in 1996. He won the silver medal in the men's lightweight double sculls event in Atlanta, United States, alongside Pepijn Aardewijn. The pair came in 12th in 2000 in Sydney, Australia.
