= Esperanza Márquez =

Spanish rower

Personal information
- Nationality: Spanish
- Born: 10 July 1973 (age 51); Seville, Spain

Sport
- Sport: Rowing

Esperanza Márquez (born 10 July 1973) is a Spanish rower. She competed in the women's lightweight double sculls event at the 1996 Summer Olympics.
