= Alastair Isherwood =

Australian rower

Personal information
- Born: 7 March 1975 (age 51)

Sport
- Sport: Rowing
- Club: Banks Rowing Club; Melb University Boat Club
Medal record
Men's rowing
Representing Australia
World Rowing Championships
Gold medal – first place	1997 Aiguebelette	Lwt eight

Alastair Isherwood (born 7 March 1975) is an Australian lightweight rower and a former world champion. He won a gold medal at the 1997 World Rowing Championships in Aiguebelette with the lightweight men's eight. He later worked as a rowing coach.

== Club and state rowing ==
Isherwood's senior club rowing was from the Banks Rowing Club in Melbourne and then the Melbourne University Boat Club.

Isherwood was first selected to represent Victoria in the men's youth eight who contested the Noel F Wilkinson Trophy in the Interstate Regatta within the 1994 Australian Rowing Championships. He stroked that crew to victory. In 2001 and 2002 he rowed in Victorian representative men's lightweight fours contesting the Penrith Cup at the Interstate Regatta.

== International representative rowing ==
In 1997 Isherwood made his senior Australian representative debut in the Lyall McCarthy coached men's lightweight eight. At the 1997 World Rowing Championships in Aiguebelette, Isherwood rowed in the three seat of that boat to a thrilling final victory by 0.03 seconds with only 1.5 lengths separating the field. Isherwood won his first and only world championship title. In 1998 Isherwood rowed with his Victorian team-mate Jon Berney from the '97 eight in a lightweight coxless pair. They won silver and then gold at two World Rowing Cups that year in Europe before racing that pair at the 1998 World Championships in Cologne to a fifth place finish.

In 2001 Isherwood raced with Samuel Beltz in a lightweight coxless pair at the World Rowing Cup IV and then at the 2001 World Rowing Championships in Lucerne he finished in tenth place in the pair with Beltz and in sixth place in the men's lightweight eight. It was his last Australian representative appearance.

== Coaching career ==
After competitive retirement Isherwood took up coaching at school, club, national and international levels. He was the head coach at the Mercantile Rowing Club at the 2011 Australian Rowing Championships and has coached national title winning crews.
