= Dirksen =

Dirksen is a surname. Notable people with the surname include:

- Corra Dirksen (1938–2020), South African rugby union player
- Dirk Dirksen (1937–2006), American music promoter and emcee
- Emily Dirksen (born 1969), American rower
- Everett Dirksen (1896–1969), U.S. politician
  - Dirksen Senate Office Building, in Washington, D.C., named after Everett Dirksen
  - Everett McKinley Dirksen United States Courthouse, in Chicago, Illinois, named after Everett Dirksen
- Hanno Dirksen (born 1991), South African rugby union player
- Herbert von Dirksen (1882–1955), German diplomat
- Richard Wayne Dirksen (1921–2003), American musician and composer
