= Franco Sancassani =

Italian rower

Personal information
- Nationality: Italian
- Born: 12 April 1974 (age 52) Lecco, Italy

Sport
- Country: Italy
- Sport: Rowing; Skyrunning
- Club: G.S. Marina Militare
Medal record
Men's rowing
World Rowing Championships
Gold medal – first place	1996 Motherwell	LM4x
Gold medal – first place	1997 Aiguebelette-le-Lac	LM4x
Gold medal – first place	1998 Cologne	LM4x
Gold medal – first place	1999 St. Catharines	LM4x
Gold medal – first place	2004 Banyoles	LM4x
Gold medal – first place	2006 Dorney	LM8+
Gold medal – first place	2008 Ottensheim	LM4x
Gold medal – first place	2009 Poznań	LM4x
Gold medal – first place	2011 Bled	LM4x
Silver medal – second place	2000 Zagreb	LM4x
Silver medal – second place	2002 Seville	LM2-
Bronze medal – third place	1995 Tampere	LM4x
European Rowing Championships
Gold medal – first place	2010 Montemor-o-Velho	LM4x

Franco Sancassani (born 12 April 1974) is an Italian rower. He is the brother of fellow rower and World Championships gold medalist Elisabetta Sancassani.

== Biography ==
Sancassani was part of the team which finished fourth at the 2000 Summer Olympics. He largely specialises in lightweight and sculls events and has won nine gold medals at the World Rowing Championships. In 2013 he was awarded the Lifetime Achievement Award at Oscar del remo (awards honouring Italian rowers).
