= Fernando Zapata =

Argentine rower

Personal information
- Nationality: Argentine
- Born: 15 August 1973 (age 52)

Sport
- Sport: Rowing

Fernando Zapata (born 15 August 1973) is an Argentine rower. He competed in the men's lightweight double sculls event at the 1996 Summer Olympics.
