= Monika Felizeter =

Austrian rower

Personal information
- Nationality: Austrian
- Born: 7 November 1977 (age 47); Bregenz, Austria

Sport
- Sport: Rowing

Monika Felizeter (born 7 November 1977) is an Austrian rower. She competed in the women's lightweight double sculls event at the 1996 Summer Olympics.
