= Tomáš Kacovský =

Czech rower

Medal record

Men's rowing

Representing Czech Republic

World Rowing Championships
Silver medal – second place	1995 Tampere	LM1x
Silver medal – second place	1996 Strathclyde	LM1x
Bronze medal – third place	1997 Aiguebelette	LM1x

Tomáš Kacovský (born 29 August 1969 in Prague) is a Czech rower. Until 1992, he competed for Czechoslovakia.
