= Magne Kvalvik =

Norwegian rower

Personal information
- Nationality: Norwegian
- Born: 3 July 1973 (age 52) Porsgrunn, Norway

Sport
- Sport: Rowing

Magne Kvalvik (born 3 July 1973) is a Norwegian rower. He competed in the men's lightweight double sculls event at the 1996 Summer Olympics.
