= Uwe Maerz =

German rower

Personal information
- Born: 6 October 1969 (age 56)

Sport
- Sport: Rowing
Medal record
Men's rowing
Representing Germany
World Rowing Championships
Gold medal – first place	1996 Motherwell	Lwt eight
Bronze medal – third place	1992 Montreal	Lwt eight

Uwe Maerz (born 6 October 1969) is a German lightweight rower. He won a gold medal at the 1996 World Rowing Championships in Motherwell with the lightweight men's eight.
