= Sarah Simmons =

American rower

Sara Simmons (born February 10, 1972, in Belmont, Massachusetts), is an American rower. In the 1995 World Rowing Championships, she won a gold medal in the women's lightweight coxless four event. She also won a bronze medal in the 1996 World Rowing Championships in the same event.
