= Wolfgang Sigl =

Austrian rower

Personal information
- Born: 23 December 1972 (age 53)

Sport
- Sport: Rowing
Medal record
Men's rowing
Representing Austria
World Rowing Championships
Gold medal – first place	1993 Roudnice	LM4x
Gold medal – first place	1994 Indianapolis	LM4x
Gold medal – first place	1995 Tampere	LM4x
Gold medal – first place	2001 Lucerne	LM4-

Wolfgang Sigl (born 23 December 1972 in Linz) is an Austrian rower. He finished fifth in the men's lightweight double sculls at the 1996 Summer Olympics. Both his mother (Renate Sigl née Sika) and grandmother (Eva Sika) were multiple medallists at European Rowing Championships in single sculls. His grandmother won five silver and two bronze medals, and his mother won two bronze medals.
