= Massimo Guglielmi =

Italian rower

Personal information
- Born: 10 January 1970 (age 56)

Sport
- Sport: Rowing
Medal record
Men's rowing
Representing Italy
World Rowing Championships
Gold medal – first place	1990 Tasmania	Lwt quad scull
Gold medal – first place	1992 Montreal	Lwt quad scull
Gold medal – first place	1996 Motherwell	Lwt quad scull
Gold medal – first place	1997 Aiguebelette	Lwt quad scull
Silver medal – second place	1994 Indianapolis	Lwt quad scull
Bronze medal – third place	1995 Tampere	Lwt quad scull
Bronze medal – third place	1998 Cologne	Lwt eight
Bronze medal – third place	2001 Lucerne	Lwt pair

Massimo Guglielmi (born 10 January 1970) is an Italian lightweight rower. He won a gold medal at the 1990 World Rowing Championships in Tasmania with the lightweight men's quadruple scull.
