= Kenichi Obinata =

Japanese rower (born 1968)

Personal information
- Nationality: Japanese
- Born: 17 January 1968 (age 58) Niigata, Japan

Sport
- Sport: Rowing

Kenichi Obinata (born 17 January 1968) is a Japanese rower. He competed in the men's lightweight double sculls event at the 1996 Summer Olympics.
