= Kai von Warburg =

German rower (1968–2026)

Personal information
- Born: 10 March 1968
- Died: 31 May 2026

Sport
- Sport: Rowing
Medal record
Men's rowing
Representing Germany
World Rowing Championships
Gold medal – first place	1991 Vienna	Lwt double scull
Bronze medal – third place	1992 Montreal	Lwt eight

Kai von Warburg (10 March 1968 – 31 May 2026) was a German lightweight rower. He won a gold medal at the 1991 World Rowing Championships in Vienna with the lightweight men's double scull.
