= Jill Blois =

Canadian rower

Personal information
- Full name: Jillian Rose Blois
- Born: Gander, Newfoundland, Canada

Sport
- Country: Canada
- Sport: Rowing
Medal record
Rowing
Representing Canada
World Championships
Gold medal – first place	1990 Tasmania	Lightweight fours
Bronze medal – third place	1992 Montreal	Lightweight fours

Jillian Blois Rose (born 1966) is a Canadian retired rower. She was a World champion in the lightweight fours.
