= Tor Albert Ersdal =

Norwegian rower

Personal information
- Nationality: Norwegian
- Born: 10 January 1972 (age 54) Stavanger, Norway

Sport
- Sport: Rowing

Tor Albert Ersdal (born 10 January 1972) is a Norwegian rower. He competed in the men's lightweight double sculls event at the 1996 Summer Olympics.
