= Andrea Boltz =

Mexican rower (born 1969)

Personal information
- Nationality: Mexican
- Born: 2 February 1969 (age 57)

Sport
- Sport: Rowing
Medal record
Representing Mexico
Pan American Games
Bronze medal – third place	1995 Mar del Plata	Single sculls
Central American and Caribbean Games
Gold medal – first place	1993 Ponce	Double sculls
Gold medal – first place	1993 Ponce	Lwt quadruple sculls
Silver medal – second place	1993 Ponce	Quadruple sculls

Andrea Maria Boltz Bradstreet (born 2 February 1969) is a Mexican rower. She competed in the women's lightweight double sculls event at the 1996 Summer Olympics.
