= Vladimir Vukelic =

German rower

Personal information
- Born: 8 August 1975 (age 50)

Sport
- Sport: Rowing
Medal record
Men's rowing
Representing Germany
World Rowing Championships
Gold medal – first place	1996 Motherwell	Lwt eight
Gold medal – first place	1998 Cologne	Lwt eight

Vladimir Vukelic (born 8 August 1975) is a German lightweight rower. He won a gold medal at the 1996 World Rowing Championships in Motherwell with the lightweight men's eight.

He now works at Ruderklub am Wannsee as coach of the junior rowing squad.
