= Agustín Rocha =

Argentine rower (born 1971)

Personal information
- Full name: Agustín Rocha Cano
- Nationality: Argentine
- Born: 10 May 1971 (age 55)

Sport
- Sport: Rowing

Agustín Rocha Cano (Note: In this Spanish name, the first or paternal surname is Rocha and the second or maternal family name is Cano.) (born 10 May 1971) is an Argentine rower. He competed in the men's lightweight double sculls event at the 1996 Summer Olympics.
