= Olaf Kaska =

German rower (born 1973)

Personal information
- Born: 15 January 1973 (age 53)

Sport
- Sport: Rowing
Medal record
Men's rowing
Representing Germany
World Rowing Championships
| Gold medal – first place | 1998 Cologne | Lwt eight |
| Gold medal – first place | 2003 Milan | Lwt eight |
| Bronze medal – third place | 1992 Montreal | Lwt eight |

Olaf Kaska (born 15 January 1973) is a German coxswain. He won a gold medal at the 1998 World Rowing Championships in Cologne with the lightweight men's eight.
