= Soberanes =

Soberanes is a surname. Notable people with the surname include:

- Ana Sofía Soberanes (born 1977), Mexican rower
- José Luis Soberanes (born 1950), Mexican lawyer
- Juan Soberanes (born 1968), Mexican boxer
