= Oliver Rau =

German lightweight rower (born 1968)

Personal information
- Born: 21 May 1968 (age 58)
- Spouse: Jana Sorgers

Sport
- Sport: Rowing
Medal record
Men's rowing
Representing Germany
World Rowing Championships
Bronze medal – third place	1994 Indianapolis	Lightweight men's four
Bronze medal – third place	1995 Tampere	Lightweight men's four
Bronze medal – third place	1996 Motherwell	Lightweight men's pair

Oliver Rau (born 21 May 1968) is a German lightweight rower.

Rau was born in 1968. At the 1993 World Rowing Championships, he was part of the German lightweight men's eight that came fourth. At the 1994 World Rowing Championships, he won a bronze medal in the lightweight men's four. At the 1995 World Rowing Championships, the lightweight men's four again came third. At the 1996 World Rowing Championships, he won a bronze medal in the lightweight men's pair.

After his retirement from competitive rowing, he married fellow rower Jana Sorgers. The couple have twin daughters (born c. 2000) and for many years, they lived in Bremen. Oliver Rau worked for sports club SV Werder Bremen from 1996 until 2017. He now works for Stiftung Deutsche Sporthilfe and they live in Frankfurt.
