= Juan Carlos Sáez (rower) =

Spanish rower

Juan Carlos Sáez Bernardos
Personal information
- Nationality: Spanish
- Born: 7 June 1961 (age 63); Madrid, Spain

Sport
- Sport: Rowing

Juan Carlos Sáez (born 7 June 1961) is a Spanish rower. He competed in the men's lightweight double sculls event at the 1996 Summer Olympics.
