= Whitney Post =

American rower

Whitney Post (born 25 June 1973) is an American rower. In the 1995 World Rowing Championships, she won a gold medal in the women's lightweight coxless four event. She also won a bronze medal in the 1996 World Rowing Championships in the same event.
