= Walter Rantasa =

Austrian rower (born 1966)

Medal record

Men's rowing

Representing Austria

World Rowing Championships
Gold medal – first place	1989 Bled	LM2x
Gold medal – first place	1993 Roudnice	LM4x
Gold medal – first place	1994 Indianapolis	LM4x
Gold medal – first place	1995 Tampere	LM4x
Silver medal – second place	1991 Wien	LM2x
Silver medal – second place	1992 Montreal	LM2x
Bronze medal – third place	1990 Tasmania	LM2x

Walter Rantasa (born 14 February 1966 in Vienna) is an Austrian rower. He finished fifth in the men's lightweight double sculls at the 1996 Summer Olympics.
