= Susan Walker =

Susan Walker may refer to:

- Susan Walker (archaeologist)
- Susan Walker Fitzgerald (1871–1943), American suffragist
- Susan Lalic (born 1965) (née Walker), English chess player

== In fiction ==
- Susan Walker, a major character in Coupling
- Susan Walker, a major character in Miracle on 34th Street
- Susan Walker, a major character in Swallows and Amazons
- Susan Walker, a character played by comedian Liam Kyle Sullivan

== See also ==
- Sue Walker (disambiguation)
- Suzanne Walker, professor of microbiology and molecular genetics
