= Alison Brownless =

British rower

Alison Purnell
Personal information
- Nickname: Wilma
- Born: Oxford, Great Britain
- Height: 160 cm (5 ft 3 in)

Sport
- Country: Great Britain
- Sport: Rowing
- Retired: 1996
Medal record
Rowing
Representing Great Britain
World Championships
Gold medal – first place	1993 Racice	LW4-
Silver medal – second place	1991 Vienna	LW4-
Silver medal – second place	1992 Montreal	LW4-
Silver medal – second place	1994 Indianapolis	LW4-
Silver medal – second place	1995 Tampere	LW2-
Silver medal – second place	1996 Glasgow	LW2-

Alison "Wilma" Purnell née Alison Brownless (born 1962) is a retired British rower who competed at international level events. She was a World champion and five-time silver medalist in the women's lightweight pairs and fours. She was the first British woman to win six Championship medals.
