= Paolo Pittino =

Italian lightweight rower (born 1968)

Personal information
- Born: 2 February 1968 (age 58)

Sport
- Sport: Rowing
Medal record
Men's rowing
Representing Italy
World Rowing Championships
Gold medal – first place	1990 Tasmania	Lwt quad scull
Gold medal – first place	1996 Motherwell	Lwt quad scull
Gold medal – first place	1997 Aiguebelette	Lwt quad scull
Gold medal – first place	1998 Cologne	Lwt quad scull
Gold medal – first place	1999 St. Catharines	Lwt coxless pair
Silver medal – second place	1994 Indianapolis	Lwt quad scull
Bronze medal – third place	1993 Račice	Lwt double scull
Bronze medal – third place	1995 Tampere	Lwt quad scull

Paolo Pittino (born 2 February 1968) is an Italian lightweight rower. He won a gold medal at the 1999 World Rowing Championships in St. Catharines with the lightweight men's coxless pair.
