= Matthias Edeler =

German rower

Personal information
- Born: 8 January 1970 (age 56)

Sport
- Sport: Rowing
Medal record
Men's rowing
Representing Germany
World Rowing Championships
Gold medal – first place	1996 Motherwell	Lwt eight
Gold medal – first place	1998 Cologne	Lwt eight

Matthias Edeler (born 8 January 1970) is a German lightweight rower. He won a gold medal at the 1996 World Rowing Championships in Motherwell with the lightweight men's eight.
