= 2025 Læsø municipal election =

- 18 November 2025

All 9 seats to the Læsø municipal council 5 seats needed for a majority
- Turnout: 1,269 (85.7%) ▲4.9%
	First party	Second party	Third party
	C	V	O
Party	Conservatives	Venstre	Danish People's Party
Last election	2 seats, 23.9%	3 seats, 25.3%	1 seat, 8.0%
Seats won	5	2	1
Seat change	▲3	▼1	0
Popular vote	573	192	201
Percentage	45.6%	15.3%	16.0%
Swing	▲21.7%	▼10.1%	▲8.0%
	Fourth party	Fifth party	Sixth party
	F	A	L
Party	Green Left	Social Democrats	Læsø Borgerliste
Last election	Did not stand	1 seat, 16.5%	2 seats, 21.5%
Seats won	1	0	0
Seat change	▲1	▼1	▼2
Popular vote	102	100	47
Percentage	8.1%	8.0%	3.7%
Swing	New	▼8.5%	▼17.8%
Mayor before election
Tobias Birch Johansen
Venstre
Mayor after election
Niels Odgaad
Conservatives

The 2025 Læsø Municipal election was held on November 18, 2025, to elect the 9 members to sit in the regional council for the Læsø Municipal council, in the period of 2026 to 2029. The result saw the Conservatives win 5 seats, resulting in an absolute majority. Despite, Thomas W. Olsen receiving the highest number of personal votes, Niels Odgaard, the party's mayoral candidate, would win the mayoral position. The Social Democrats would fail to win any seats, marking the first time since the structural reform in 2007, that they were not represented in all 98 municipal councils.

== Background ==
Since the 2009 Læsø municipal election, no mayor has been elected for two terms in a row. Incumbent mayor at the time of election was Tobias Birch Johansen from Venstre, who were the only party to win at least 3 seats in the 2021 election. In April 2025, Birch Johansen, revealed that he would not seek re-election in 2025.

== Electoral system ==
For elections to Danish municipalities, a number varying from 9 to 31 are chosen to be elected to the municipal council. The seats are then allocated using the D'Hondt method and a closed list proportional representation. Læsø Municipality had 9 seats in 2025

Unlike in Danish General Elections, in elections to municipal councils, electoral alliances are allowed.

== Electoral alliances ==
=== Electoral Alliance 1 ===
Party		Political alignment
L	Læsø Borgerliste	Local politics
V	Venstre	Centre-right
Æ	Denmark Democrats	Right-wing

== Results by polling station ==
Division	A	C	F	L	O	V	Æ
Division	%	%	%	%	%	%	%
Læsø Hallen	8.0	45.6	8.1	3.7	16.0	15.3	3.3

== Results ==
Party		Votes	%	+/-	Seats	+/-
Læsø Municipality
C	Conservatives	573	45.58	+21.66	5	+3
O	Danish People's Party	201	15.99	+7.99	1	0
V	Venstre	192	15.27	-10.06	2	-1
F	Green Left	102	8.11	New	1	New
A	Social Democrats	100	7.96	-8.55	0	-1
L	Læsø Borgerliste	47	3.74	-17.80	0	-2
Æ	Denmark Democrats	42	3.34	New	0	New
Total		1,257	100	N/A	9	N/A
Invalid votes		5	0.34	-0.50		
Blank votes		7	0.47	-1.17		
Turnout		1,269	85.69	+4.90		
Source: valg.dk

== Opinion polls ==
Polling firm	Fieldwork date	Sample size	V	C	L	A	O	F	Æ	Others	Lead
Epinion	4 Sep - 13 Oct 2025	31	5.6	53.6	–	12.4	12.3	16.1	0.0	0.0	37.5
2024 european parliament election	9 Jun 2024		18.0	5.7	–	11.5	15.2	11.5	19.5	–	1.5
2022 general election	1 Nov 2022		14.9	6.1	–	26.2	4.7	5.0	20.0	–	6.2
2021 regional election	16 Nov 2021		14.9	46.7	–	18.5	4.3	4.1	–	–	28.2
2021 municipal election	16 Nov 2021		25.3 (3)	23.9 (2)	21.5 (2)	16.5 (1)	8.0 (1)	–	–	–	1.4
