= Ellen Meliesie =

Dutch rower (1963–2026)

Personal information
- Full name: Elisabeth Johanna Wilhelmina Meliesie
- Nationality: Dutch
- Born: 2 January 1963 Zwolle, Netherlands
- Died: 10 October 2026 (aged 63)

Sport
- Sport: Rowing

Elisabeth Johanna Wilhelmina Meliesie (2 January 1963 – 10 October 2026), known as Ellen Meliesie, was a Dutch rower. She competed in the women's lightweight double sculls event at the 1996 Summer Olympics.

Meliesie died from cancer on 10 October 2026, at the age of 63.
