= Martin Sorensen =

Danish rower

Sport
- Sport: Rowing
Medal record
Men's rowing
Representing Denmark
World Championships
Gold medal – first place	1992 Montreal	Lwt eight

Martin Sorensen is a Danish lightweight rower. He won a gold medal at the 1992 World Rowing Championships in Montreal with the lightweight men's eight.
