= Jane Hall (rower) =

British rower

Personal information
- Full name: Jane Lucy Hall
- Nationality: British
- Born: 20 October 1973 (age 52) Kingston upon Thames

Sport
- Club: Kingston RC
Medal record
Women's rowing
Representing Great Britain
World Rowing Championships
Gold medal – first place	1993 Račice	LW4-
Silver medal – second place	1995 Tampere	LW2-
Silver medal – second place	1996 Strathclyde	LW2-
Silver medal – second place	1999 St. Catharines	LW2-
Silver medal – second place	2007 Munich	LW4x
Silver medal – second place	2009 Poznań	LW4x

Jane Lucy Hall (born 20 October 1973 in Kingston upon Thames) is a former British rower who won six World Championship medals.

== Rowing career ==
Hall won the gold medal in the lightweight coxless four with Alison Brownless, Annamarie Dryden and Tonia Williams at the 1993 World Rowing Championships.

She was part of the coxless pair with Alison Brownless that won the national title rowing for a Kingston and Thames composite at the 1996 National Championships. She also won a second gold at the same Championships in the eight composite.
