= Tim Wright (rower) =

Australian rower

Personal information
- Born: 18 February 1973 (age 53)

Sport
- Sport: Rowing
- Club: Wendouree Ballarat Rowing Club
Medal record
Men's rowing
Representing Australia
World Rowing Championships
| Gold medal – first place | 1997 Aiguebelette | LM8+ |
U23 World Championships
| Silver medal – second place | U23 1995 Groningen | LM4- |

Tim Wright (born 18 February 1973) is an Australian former world champion lightweight rower. He won a gold medal at the 1997 World Rowing Championships in Aiguebelette with the lightweight men's eight.

== Club and state rowing ==
Wright took up rowing at Ballarat High School as a coxswain. His senior rowing was from the Wendouree-Ballarat Rowing Club.

Richards rowed in Victorian representative men's lightweight fours contesting the Penrith Cup at the Interstate Regatta within the Australian Rowing Championships in 1997 and 1999.

== International representative rowing ==
Wright first represented Australia in the lightweight coxless at the 1994 World Rowing U23 Championships in Paris where the Australians finished fourth. The following year at Groningen in The Netherlands he again raced at the U23 World Championships in the lightweight coxless four and they won the silver medal.

In 1997 he made his debut in an Australian senior crew seated in the bow of the men's lightweight eight. At the 1997 World Rowing Championships in Aiguebelette, the Australians won a thrilling final by 0.03 seconds with only 1.5 lengths separating the field. Wright won his first and only World Championship title in his only senior World Championship appearance.
