= Peter Uhrig =

German rower

Personal information
- Born: 23 May 1965 (age 61)

Sport
- Sport: Rowing
Medal record
Men's rowing
World Rowing Championships
Representing West Germany
Gold medal – first place	1989 Bled	Lwt quad scull
Representing Germany
Silver medal – second place	1991 Vienna	Lwt single scull
Silver medal – second place	1994 Indianapolis	Double scull
Bronze medal – third place	1993 Račice	Double scull

Peter Uhrig (born 23 May 1965) is a German lightweight rower. He won a gold medal at the 1989 World Rowing Championships in Bled with the lightweight men's quadruple scull. He competed at the 1996 Summer Olympics in lightweight double sculls and came eleventh.
