= Martina Orzan =

Italian rower

Personal information
- Nationality: Italian
- Born: 6 September 1971 (age 55) Trieste, Italy

Sport
- Sport: Rowing
Medal record
Representing Italy
Summer Universiade
Bronze medal – third place	1993 Buffalo	Lwt single sculls
Mediterranean Games
Silver medal – second place	2001 Tunis	Lwt double sculls

Martina Orzan (born 6 September 1971) is an Italian rower. She competed in the women's lightweight double sculls event at the 1996 Summer Olympics.
