= Thomas Croft Buck =

Danish rower (born 1970)

Personal information
- Born: Thomas Buck; 16 July 1970 (age 55)
- Education: Cand.pharm
- Occupation: Chief pharmacist

Sport
- Sport: Rowing
- Club: Bagsvaerd Rowing Club, Copenhagen Rowing Club, Vejle Rowing Club
Medal record
Men's rowing
Representing Denmark
World Championships
Gold medal – first place	1992 Montreal	Lwt eight
Silver medal – second place	1994 Indianapolis	Lwt eight
Gold medal – first place	1995 Tampere	Lwt eight
Silver medal – second place	1996 Motherwell	Lwt eight
Silver medal – second place	2001 Lucerne	Lwt eight

Thomas Croft Buck (sometimes incorrectly referred to as Buch; born 16 July 1970) is a Danish lightweight rower.

== Rowing career ==
He won a gold medal at the 1992 World Rowing Championships in Montreal with the lightweight men's eight. And another gold medal again the 1995 World Rowing Championships in Tampere with the lightweight men's eight. Buck added "Croft" as a middle name in 1991.

== FISA listings ==
Buck is listed in the World Rowing database with various entries:

- Thomas Buck: 1988 results rowing for Denmark
- Thomas Croft: results between 1990 and 2001 rowing for Denmark
- Thomas Buch: 1994 results being based in the United States
