= Klaus Klotz =

German rower (born 1976)

Personal information
- Born: 9 January 1976 (age 50)

Sport
- Sport: Rowing
Medal record
Men's rowing
Representing Germany
World Rowing Championships
Gold medal – first place	1996 Motherwell	Lwt eight

Klaus Klotz (born 9 January 1976) is a German lightweight rower. He won a gold medal at the 1996 World Rowing Championships in Motherwell with the lightweight men's eight.
