= Elizabeth Henshilwood =

British rower (born 1975)

Elizabeth Henshilwood (born 23 June 1975) is a British rower. In the 1997 World Rowing Championships, she won a gold medal in the women's coxless four event.
