= Melissa Iverson =

American rower

Melissa Iverson is an American rower. In the 1995 World Rowing Championships, she won a gold medal in the women's coxless four event.
