= Teja Töpfer =

German rower

Sport
- Sport: Rowing
Medal record
Men's rowing
Representing Germany
World Rowing Championships
Gold medal – first place	1996 Motherwell	Lwt eight

Teja Töpfer is a German lightweight rower. He won a gold medal at the 1996 World Rowing Championships in Motherwell with the lightweight men's eight.
