= Adam Michálek =

Czech rower

Personal information
- Born: 8 April 1975 (age 50); Hodonín, Czech Republic
- Height: 186 cm (6 ft 1 in)
- Weight: 86 kg (190 lb)

Sport
- Sport: Rowing
- Club: trenér VK Hodonín

Adam Michálek (born 8 April 1975) is a Czech rower. He competed at the 1996 Summer Olympics in Atlanta with the men's lightweight double sculls where they came 13th.
