= Myriam Lamolle =

French rower

Personal information
- Full name: Myriam Corinne Lamolle
- Nationality: French
- Born: 23 August 1963 (age 61); Albi, France

Sport
- Sport: Rowing

Myriam Corinne Lamolle (born 23 August 1963) is a French rower. She competed in the women's lightweight double sculls event at the 1996 Summer Olympics.
