= Colleen Miller (rower) =

Canadian rower (born 1967)

Personal information
- Full name: Colleen Grace Miller
- Born: 30 December 1967 (age 58) Matlock, Manitoba, Canada

Sport
- Sport: Rowing
Medal record
Women's rowing
Representing Canada
World Championships
Gold medal – first place	1990 Tasmania	LW4-
Silver medal – second place	1992 Montreal	LW2x
Gold medal – first place	1993 Racice	LW2x
Gold medal – first place	1994 Indianapolis	LW2x
Gold medal – first place	1995 Tampere	LW2x

Colleen Grace Miller (born 30 December 1967) is a Canadian former rower. She competed in the women's lightweight double sculls event at the 1996 Summer Olympics.
