= Carsten Glud =

Danish rower

Personal information
- Born: 14 June 1970 (age 56)

Sport
- Sport: Rowing
Medal record
Men's rowing
Representing Denmark
World Rowing Championships
Gold medal – first place	1995 Tampere	Lwt eight

Carsten Glud (born 14 June 1970) is a Danish lightweight rower. He won a gold medal at the 1995 World Rowing Championships in Tampere with the lightweight men's eight.
