= Oliver Ibielski =

German rower (1971–2017)

Personal information
- Born: 30 January 1971
- Died: 25 December 2017 (aged 46)

Sport
- Sport: Rowing
Medal record
Men's rowing
Representing Germany
World Rowing Championships
| Gold medal – first place | 1998 Cologne | Lwt eight |
| Silver medal – second place | 1996 Motherwell | Lwt quad scull |
| Silver medal – second place | 1997 Aiguebelette | Lwt quad scull |

Oliver Ibielski (30 January 1971 – 25 December 2017) was a German lightweight rower. He won a gold medal at the 1998 World Rowing Championships in Cologne with the lightweight men's eight. He died in 2017.
