= Jon Berney =

Australian rower

Personal information
- Born: 26 March 1976 (age 50)
- Education: Geelong Grammar

Sport
- Sport: Rowing
- Club: Barwon Rowing Club
Medal record
Men's rowing
Representing Australia
World Rowing Championships
| Gold medal – first place | 1997 Aiguebelette | Lwt eight |

Jon Berney (born 26 March 1976) is an Australian world champion lightweight rower. He won a gold medal at the 1997 World Rowing Championships in Aiguebelette with the lightweight men's eight.

== Club and state rowing ==
Berney's was educated and took up rowing at Geelong Grammar School. His senior club rowing was from the Barwon Rowing Club in Geelong.

== International representative rowing ==
In 1997, Berney made his Australian representative debut in the Lyall McCarthy coached men's lightweight eight. At the 1997 World Rowing Championships in Aiguebelette, Berney rowed in the four seat of that boat to a final victory by 0.03 seconds with only 1.5 lengths separating the field. Berney won his first and only World Championship title.

In 1998, Berney rowed with his team-mate Alastair Isherwood from the 1997 eight in a lightweight coxless pair. They won silver and then gold at two World Rowing Cups that year in Europe, before racing that pair at the 1998 World Championships in Cologne to a fifth place finish. It was Berney's last Australian representative appearance.

In 2013, Berney was inducted into the Rowing Victoria Hall of Fame.
