= Andy Butt =

British former rower

Andrew Butt
Personal information

Sport
- Sport: Rowing
Medal record
Men's rowing
Representing Great Britain
World Championships
Silver medal – second place	1995 Tampere	LM8+
Silver medal – second place	1992 Montreal	LM8+

Andrew Butt is a British former rower.

== Career ==
Butt competed for Durham University Boat Club as a student. He was part of the British crew that took the silver medal in the lightweight men's eight at the 1992 World Championships in Montreal. He replicated this achievement in the same event three years later, at the 1995 World Championships in Tampere.

Butt works in the insurance industry. He became a Christian in 2003 and is now a church deacon.
