= Beni Schmidt =

Swiss rower

Personal information
- Born: 26 April 1974 (age 52)

Sport
- Sport: Rowing
Medal record
Men's rowing
Representing Switzerland
World Rowing Championships
Gold medal – first place	1997 Aiguebelette	Lwt coxless pair

Beni Schmidt (born 26 April 1974) is a Swiss lightweight rower. He won a gold medal at the 1997 World Rowing Championships in Aiguebelette with the lightweight men's coxless pair.
