= Andrew Sinton =

British rower

Personal information
- Nationality: British
- Born: 19 August 1965 (age 59); Windsor, England

Sport
- Sport: Rowing

Andrew Sinton (born 19 August 1965) is a British rower. He competed in the men's lightweight double sculls event at the 1996 Summer Olympics.
