= Kaukajärvi =

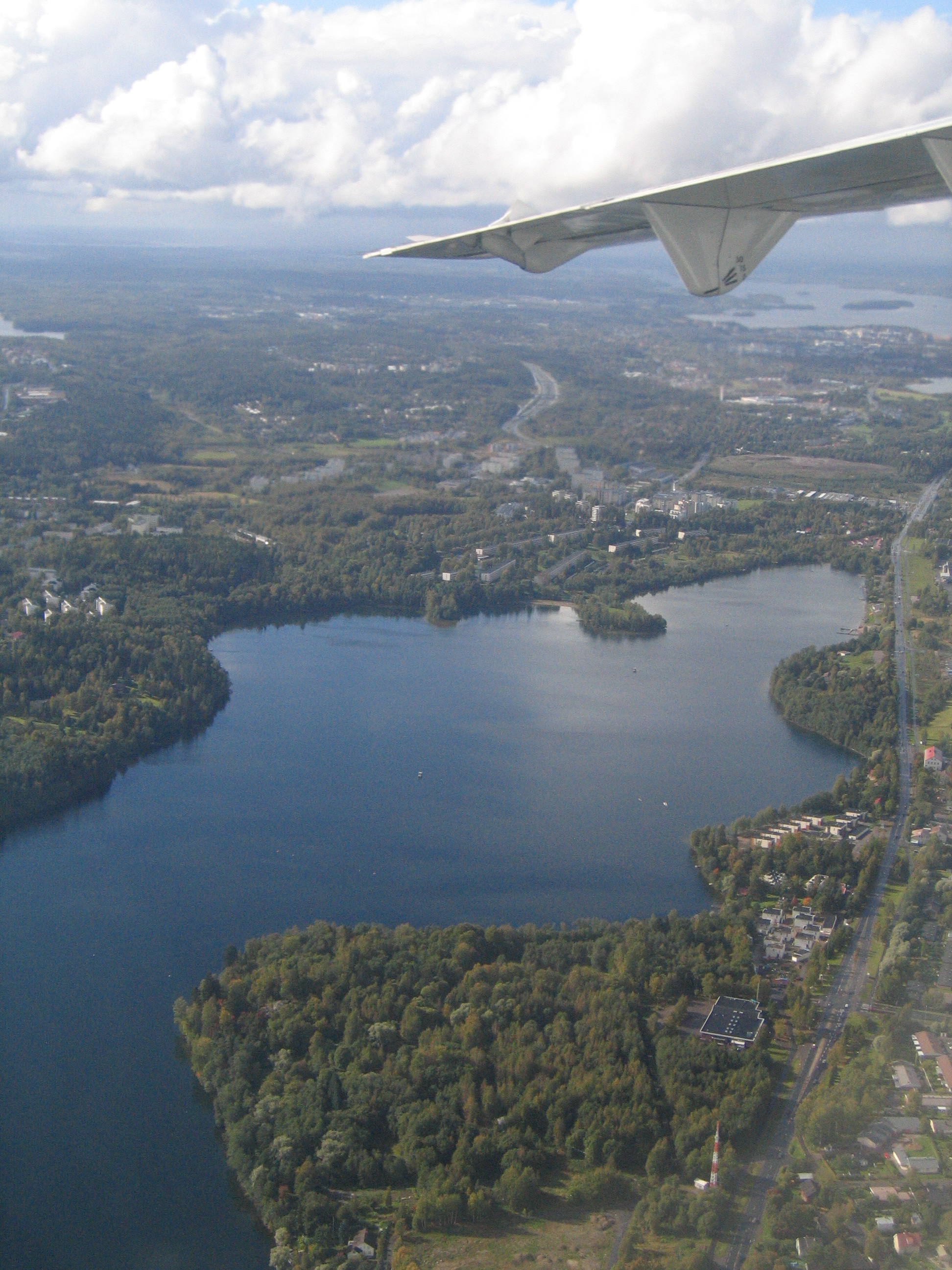
- Aerial view of Kaukajärvi

- Location within Finland
- Location: Pirkanmaa, Finland
- Coordinates: 61°28′15″N 23°54′40″E
- Type: lake
- Max. length: 3.2 km (2.0 mi)
- Max. width: .95 km (0.59 mi)
- Surface area: 1.43 km^{2} (0.55 sq mi)
- Average depth: 12 m (39 ft)
- Max. depth: 23 m (75 ft)

Kaukajärvi is a Finnish lake in the city of Tampere, Pirkanmaa. The lake is 3.2 kilometres (2.0 mi) long, 950 metres (3,120 ft) wide and covers an area of 143 hectares (350 acres). Its average depth is 12 metres (39 ft) and the maximum depth has been measured as 23 metres (75 ft).

The municipalities of Tampere and Kangasala adjoin the lake. Kaukajärvi was the venue for the 1977 World Rowing Junior Championships and the 1995 World Rowing Championships.
