= Christiane Weber (rower) =

German rower

Medal record

Women's rowing

World Rowing Championships

Representing West Germany
Bronze medal – third place	1989 Bled	LW2x

Representing Germany
Gold medal – first place	1991 Vienna	LW2x
Gold medal – first place	1992 Montreal	LW2x

Christiane Weber is a German rower.
