= Karola Schustereder =

Austrian rower

Personal information
- Nationality: Austrian
- Born: 15 October 1966 (age 58); Gmunden, Austria

Sport
- Sport: Rowing

Karola Schustereder (born 15 October 1966) is an Austrian rower. She competed in the women's lightweight double sculls event at the 1996 Summer Olympics.
