= Monika Knejp =

Swedish rower

Personal information
- Full name: Monika Ludmila Knejp
- Nationality: Swedish
- Born: 1 September 1970 (age 54); Stockholm, Sweden

Sport
- Sport: Rowing

Monika Ludmila Knejp (born 1 September 1970) is a Swedish rower. She competed in the women's lightweight double sculls event at the 1996 Summer Olympics.
