= Noriko Shibuta =

Japanese rower (born 1972)

Personal information
- Nationality: Japanese
- Born: 3 May 1972 (age 53); Aomori, Japan

Sport
- Sport: Rowing

Noriko Shibuta (Japanese: 渋田 紀子; born 3 May 1972) is a Japanese rower. She competed in the women's lightweight double sculls event at the 1996 Summer Olympics.
