= Johnny Bo Andersen =

Danish rower (born 1963)

Personal information
- Born: 22 November 1963 (age 62)

Sport
- Sport: Rowing
Medal record
Men's rowing
Representing Denmark
World Rowing Championships
Gold medal – first place	1992 Montreal	Lwt eight
Gold medal – first place	1995 Tampere	Lwt eight
Silver medal – second place	1993 Račice	Lwt eight
Silver medal – second place	1994 Indianapolis	Lwt eight

Johnny Bo Andersen (born 22 November 1963) is a Danish lightweight rower. He won a gold medal at the 1992 World Rowing Championships in Montreal with the lightweight men's eight.
