= Jeppe Jensen Kollat =

Danish rower (born 1972)

Personal information
- Born: 9 August 1972 (age 53)

Sport
- Sport: Rowing
Medal record
Men's rowing
Representing Denmark
World Rowing Championships
Gold medal – first place	1992 Montreal	Lwt eight
Gold medal – first place	1995 Tampere	Lwt eight
Silver medal – second place	1993 Račice	Lwt eight
Silver medal – second place	1994 Indianapolis	Lwt eight
Silver medal – second place	1996 Motherwell	Lwt eight
Bronze medal – third place	1997 Aiguebelette	Lwt pair

Jeppe Jensen Kollat (born 9 August 1972) is a Danish lightweight rower. He won a gold medal at the 1992 World Rowing Championships in Montreal with the lightweight men's eight.
