= Catherine Muller =

French rower

Personal information
- Full name: Catherine Brigitte Muller
- Nationality: French
- Born: 1 July 1969 (age 56) Saint-Étienne-au-Mont, France

Sport
- Sport: Rowing

Catherine Brigitte Muller (born 1 July 1969) is a French rower. She competed in the women's lightweight double sculls event at the 1996 Summer Olympics.
