= Dirk Jenny =

German rower (born 1972)

Personal information
- Born: 30 August 1972 (age 53) Aschaffenburg
- Height: 188

Sport
- Sport: Rowing
Medal record
Men's rowing
Representing Germany
World Rowing Championships
Gold medal – first place	1996 Motherwell	Lwt eight

Dirk Jenny (born 30 August 1972) is a German lightweight rower. He won a gold medal at the 1996 World Rowing Championships in Motherwell with the lightweight men's eight.
