= Bryan Thompson (rower) =

Canadian rower

Sport
- Sport: Rowing
Medal record
Men's rowing
Representing Canada
World Rowing Championships
Gold medal – first place	1993 Račice	Lwt eight
Bronze medal – third place	1996 Motherwell	Lwt eight
Bronze medal – third place	1997 Aiguebelette	Lwt eight

Bryan Thompson is a Canadian lightweight rower. He won a gold medal at the 1993 World Rowing Championships in Račice with the lightweight men's eight.
