= Sara Field (rower) =

American rower

Sara Field (born October 9, 1972) is an American rower. In the 1996 World Rowing Championships, she won a gold medal in the women's coxless four event.
