= Alexander Lutz =

German rower

Personal information
- Born: 26 July 1973 (age 52)

Sport
- Sport: Rowing
Medal record
Men's rowing
Representing Germany
World Championships
Silver medal – second place	1997 Aiguebelette	LM4x

Alexander Lutz (born 26 July 1973) is a retired German lightweight rower. He has won medals at a number of World Rowing Championships in lightweight quad scull (LM4x).
