= Torben Bech Jensen =

Danish rower (born 1973)

Personal information
- Born: 26 January 1973 (age 53)

Sport
- Sport: Rowing
Medal record
Men's rowing
Representing Denmark
World Rowing Championships
Gold medal – first place	1995 Tampere	Lwt eight

Torben Bech Jensen (born 26 January 1973) is a Danish lightweight rower. He won a gold medal at the 1995 World Rowing Championships in Tampere with the lightweight men's eight.
