= Pepijn Aardewijn =

Dutch rower (born 1970)

Medal record

Men's rowing

Representing the Netherlands

Olympic Games
Silver medal – second place	1996	Lightweight double sculls

Pepijn Aardewijn (born 15 June 1970 in Amsterdam, North Holland) is a former rower from the Netherlands, who competed for his native country in two consecutive Summer Olympics, starting in 1996. He won the silver medal in the men's lightweight double sculls event in Atlanta, Georgia, alongside Maarten van der Linden.

He is married and has a child with 2004 Olympic bronze medal and 2008 gold medal winner Kirsten van der Kolk.
