= Markus Gier =

Swiss rower

Personal information
- Born: 1 January 1970 (age 56) St. Gallen, Switzerland
- Height: 180 cm (5 ft 11 in)
- Weight: 75 kg (165 lb)
- Relatives: Michael Gier (brother)

Sport
- Sport: Rowing
- Club: Seeclub Rorschach
Medal record
Representing Switzerland
Men's rowing
Olympic Games
Gold medal – first place	1996 Atlanta	Lwt double sculls
World Rowing Championships
Silver medal – second place	1989 Bled	Lwt quad sculls
Bronze medal – third place	1992 Montreal	Lwt double sculls
Silver medal – second place	1993 Račice	Lwt double sculls
Bronze medal – third place	1994 Indianapolis	Lwt double sculls
Gold medal – first place	1995 Tampere	Lwt double sculls
Bronze medal – third place	1998 Cologne	Lwt double sculls

Markus Gier (born 1 January 1970) is a Swiss competition rower and Olympic champion. He hails from Sankt Gallen.

Gier and his brother Michael won a gold medal in lightweight double sculls at the 1996 Summer Olympics. The brothers also competed at the 2000 Summer Olympics in Sydney where they finished fifth.

He was in the silver medal-winning lightweight quad scull in Bled in 1989 along with Reto Fierz (bow), Philipp Ferlber (seat 2), and Cirillo Ghielmetti (seat 3).
