= Teresa Bell (rower) =

American rower (born 1966)

Personal information
- Born: August 28, 1966 (age 59) Washington Crossing, Pennsylvania, U.S.
Medal record
Women's rowing
Representing United States
Olympic Games
Silver medal – second place	1996 Atlanta	Lwt double sculls

Teresa A. Bell (née Zarzeczny, born August 28, 1966, in Washington Crossing, Pennsylvania) is an American rower.
