= Kristina Knejp =

Swedish rower

Medal record

Women's rowing

Representing Sweden

World Rowing Championships
Bronze medal – third place	1997 Aiguebelette	LW1x

Kristina Knejp (born 24 February 1974 in Stockholm) is a Swedish rower.
