= Anna Accensi =

Spanish rower

Personal information
- Nationality: Spanish
- Born: 1 January 1970 (age 55); Amposta, Spain

Sport
- Sport: Rowing

Anna Accensi Abella (born 1 January 1970) is a Spanish rower. She competed in the 1996 Summer Olympics.
