= Mike Rodger =

New Zealand rower

Personal information
- Born: Michael John Rodger; 25 January 1965 (age 61)
- Height: 188 cm (6 ft 2 in)

Sport
- Sport: Rowing
Medal record
Men's rowing
Representing New Zealand
World Championships
Silver medal – second place	1994 Eagle Creek Park, US	LM2x

Michael John Rodger (born 25 January 1965) is a New Zealand rower.

At the 1994 World Rowing Championships at Eagle Creek Park, Indianapolis, United States, Rodger won a Silver medal in the lightweight men's double sculls with Rob Hamill. In the same boat class, he represented New Zealand at the 1996 Summer Olympics in Atlanta, United States. He is listed as New Zealand Olympian number 738.
