= Stephen Peterson (rower) =

American rower

Personal information
- Full name: Stephen Lee Peterson
- National team: United States
- Born: June 27, 1963 (age 63) Detroit, Michigan, United States
- Education: University of Rhode Island 1985
- Occupation: Rowing coach
- Employer: Indiana University

Sport
- Sport: Rowing
Medal record
Representing the United States
World Rowing Championships
Gold medal – first place	1990 Tasmania	Lwt Double Sculls
World University Games
Bronze medal – third place	1989 Duisburg	Lwt Quadruple Sculls

Stephen Lee Peterson (born June 27, 1963) is an American rower who was a member of the 1996 U.S. Olympic team. He was also on the 1990 U.S. World Championships team where he won a gold medal in the Men's Lightweight Double Scull. He has been the head coach of the Indiana University women's rowing team since 2003.

Peterson was born in Detroit, Michigan but grew up in Cumberland, Rhode Island.

As a student at the University of Rhode Island, he was on the rowing team and a member of Sigma Pi fraternity. During his time on the rowing team at URI, he would win gold medals his freshman (1982) and junior (1984) years at the Dad Vail Collegiate National Rowing Championships.

After graduating in 1985, he would take his first coaching job as an assistant at The University of Rhode Island from 1986 to 1987and later become the head coach from 1989 to 1991. He would leave Rhode Island to become the head coach of the lightweight men's crew at Rutgers University from 1992 to 1995.

In 1996, he became the head coach of women's rowing at George Washington University where he would lead the program for eight years (1996–2003). During that time, he led the Colonial women to the NCAA Rowing Championships in 1998 and he was named Atlantic 10 Conference Coach of the Year in 2000 and 2001.

He would leave GW in 2003 and take the head coaching position at Indiana University shortly after it had been elevated to varsity status in 2000. In his 20+ years at IU, he would lead the Hoosiers to multiple Big Ten Championship medals as well as the NCAA Rowing Championships nine times (2014, 2015, 2016, 2017, 2018, 2019, 2023, 2024, 2025). In 2014, he was named NCAA Division I Rowing Coach of the Year and in 2023 and 2024, he was named Big Ten Conference Rowing Coach of the Year.

In addition to coaching collegiately, he was a part of the United States National Team coaching staff from 1999 to 2003. During that time he led the US Lightweight Women's Scullers to medals at the Pan Am Games and World Championships all four years.

Peterson continued his own competitive rowing career while he was coaching and he would eventually end up on seven US National teams between 1989 and 1996. His gold medal at the 1990 World Rowing Championships in the Men's' Lightweight Double Sculls in Tasmania, Australia would be his highest finish at the international level. That gold medal performance was extremely unique because he and his partner, Robert Dreher, had to stop momentarily 400m into the grand final race to fix an equipment issue, before continuing on to win the event.

Peterson and Dreher would win the 1990 Vesper Cup Award for their performance which is given annually to the members of the US National Team for outstanding and inspirational achievement in international competition.

In 1996, Peterson qualified in the Men's' Lightweight Double Sculls to compete for the United States at the Atlanta Olympic Games. It was the first time lightweight rowing events were ever in the Olympic program, and Peterson was the first rower ever to be weighed in for an Olympic rowing event.

His rowing career ended after the 1996 Olympics and Peterson was inducted into the U.S. Rowing Hall of Fame in 1999. In 2000, he was also inducted into the University of Rhode Island's Athletic Hall of Fame. In total, Peterson earned over 50 medals at all levels of competition, from collegiate to elite, during his rowing career.

== Awards and recognition ==
Peterson has earned awards for both his rowing and his coaching careers. Below is a summary of his top accolades:

- 2023 and 2024 Big Ten Conference Head Coach of the Year

- 2014 NCAA Division I and Central Region Head Coach and Coaching Staff of the Year

- 2000 & 2001 Atlantic 10 Conference Head Coach of the Year

- 2000 University of Rhode Island Hall of Fame Inductee

- 1999 US Rowing Hall of Fame Inductee

- 1996 US Olympic Team Member

- 1990 World Champion, Men's Lightweight Double Sculls

- 1990 Vesper Cup Award Winner for Outstanding and Inspirational Achievement in International competition.

- Seven-time US National Rowing Team Member

== Family ==
Peterson is married to Meredith Morgan Peterson and has one son, Tyler, and one daughter, Sydney.
