= Michael K. Jensen =

American mechanical engineer

Michael K. Jensen is an American mechanical engineer.

== Career ==
Jensen earned a Master's of Science in mechanical engineering in 1976, and completed a PhD in the same subject in 1980, both from Iowa State University. He taught at the Rensselaer Polytechnic Institute where, in 2005, he was appointed the founding project director and principal investigator of the Center for Future Energy Systems, a collaboration between RPI and Cornell University.

== Awards and honors ==
Jensen was elected a fellow of the American Society of Mechanical Engineers in 1996.
