= Sue Walker (rower) =

British rower (born 1967)

Sue Walker (born 14 September 1967) is a British rower. In the 1997 World Rowing Championships, she won a gold medal in the women's coxless four event.
