= Phil Henry (rower) =

American rower

Personal information
- Full name: Philip Henry
- Nationality: American
- Born: April 16, 1971 (age 55)
- Height: 1.90 m (6 ft 3 in)
- Weight: 95 kg (209 lb)

Sport
- Country: United States
- Sport: Rowing
- Club: Princeton TC
Medal record
Men's rowing
Representing the United States
Pan American Games
Gold medal – first place	1999 Winnipeg	Eight
World Championships
Gold medal – first place	1997 Aiguebelette	Eight
Gold medal – first place	1999 St. Catharines	Coxed pair
Bronze medal – third place	1998 Cologne	Coxed pair

Philip Henry (born April 16, 1971) is an American former rower.

== Biography ==
Henry trained in Princeton, New Jersey, but grew up in Seattle and attended the University of Washington. He was a member of the American eight crew that won the gold medal at the 1997 World Rowing Championships. In 1999 he was World Champion in the coxed pair and won gold in the eight at the Pan American Games in Winnipeg. He was an alternate at the 2000 Summer Olympics for the United States.
