= Andreas Lutz (rower) =

German rower

Sport
- Sport: Rowing
Medal record
Men's rowing
Representing Germany
World Championships
Bronze medal – third place	1996 Glasgow	LM4x

Andreas Lutz (born 1970) is a retired German lightweight rower. He has won medals at a number of World Rowing Championships in lightweight quad scull (LM4x).
