= Marco Audisio =

Italian rower

Personal information
- Nationality: Italian
- Born: 29 July 1975 (age 49); Cittiglio, Italy

Sport
- Sport: Rowing

Marco Audisio (born 29 July 1975) is an Italian rower. He competed in the men's lightweight double sculls event at the 1996 Summer Olympics.
