= Michael Jensen (rower) =

Danish rower

Sport
- Sport: Rowing
Medal record
Men's rowing
Representing Denmark
World Rowing Championships
Gold medal – first place	1995 Tampere	Lwt eight
Silver medal – second place	1994 Indianapolis	Lwt eight
Silver medal – second place	1996 Motherwell	Lwt eight

Michael Jensen is a Danish lightweight rower. He won a gold medal at the 1995 World Rowing Championships in Tampere with the lightweight men's eight.
