= Ayako Yoshida =

Japanese rower (born 1976)

Personal information
- Nationality: Japanese
- Born: 28 April 1976 (age 49); Aomori, Japan

Sport
- Sport: Rowing

Ayako Yoshida (吉田 理子, Yoshida Ayako, born 28 April 1976) is a Japanese rower. She competed at the 1996 Summer Olympics and the 2000 Summer Olympics.
