= Cindy Brooks (rower) =

American rower (born 1965)

Cindy Brooks (born January 9, 1965) is an American rower. In the 1995 World Rowing Championships, she won a gold medal in the women's coxless four event.
