= Rosana Zegarra =

American rower

Rosana Zegarra is an American rower. In the 1996 World Rowing Championships, she won a gold medal in the women's coxless four event.
