= Michael Wiseman (rower) =

Australian rower

Personal information
- Born: 24 June 1977 (age 49)
- Education: Shore School
- Years active: 1993–2000

Sport
- Sport: Rowing
- Club: SUBC
Medal record
Men's rowing
Representing Australia
World Rowing Championships
| Gold medal – first place | 1997 Aiguebelette | LM8+ |
| Bronze medal – third place | 2000 Zagreb | LM8+ |
World Rowing U23 Championships
| Gold medal – first place | 1996 Hazewinkel | LM4- |
| Silver medal – second place | 1995 Groningen | LM4- |
Junior World Rowing Championships
| Gold medal – first place | 1995 Juniors Poznan | LM4+ |

Michael Wiseman (born 24 June 1977) is an Australian former lightweight rower, a world champion and national champion. He won a gold medal at the 1997 World Rowing Championships in Aiguebelette in the lightweight men's eight.

== Club and state rowing ==
Wiseman attended Sydney Church of England Grammar School where he took up rowing. His senior club rowing was from the Sydney University Boat Club.

Wiseman rowed in five consecutive New South Wales representative men's lightweight fours contesting the Penrith Cup at the Interstate Regatta within the Australian Rowing Championships from 1996 to 2000. Those New South Wales crews of 1997 and 1998 were victorious.

== International representative rowing ==
Wiseman first represented Australia aged just eighteen in the lightweight coxless four at the 1995 World Rowing U23 Championships at Groningen in The Netherlands where the Australian four won the silver medal. That same year he also rowed at the Junior World Rowing Championships in a coxed four. The Australian junior squad was decimated by food poisoning at those championships in Poznan, Poland but the coxed four was the only sweep crew unaffected and able to race as selected. They won the gold. Then at the 1996 World Rowing U23 Championships in Hazewinkel Wiseman stroked an Australian lightweight coxless four to a gold medal victory.

In 1997 he made his debut in an Australian senior crew – the Lyall McCarthy coached men's lightweight eight. At the 1997 World Rowing Championships in Aiguebelette, Wiseman stroked the Australians to a thrilling final victory by 0.03 seconds with only 1.5 lengths separating the field. Wiseman won his first and only World Championship title.

At the 1999 World Championships in St Catharines Canada, Wiseman rowed a lightweight coxless pair with Robert Mitchell to a seventh place finish. In 2000 Wiseman made his last Australian representative appearance at the lightweight-only 2000 World Rowing Championships in Zagreb in the men's eight. They won the bronze medal.

== Post competition ==
Wiseman led the consultation in the rebuilding of the Sydney University boatshed at Linley Point on Burns Bay. The shed was burnt down in 2006 and rebuilding was not complete until 2017.
