= Lorenzo Bertini (rower) =

Italian rower (born 1976)

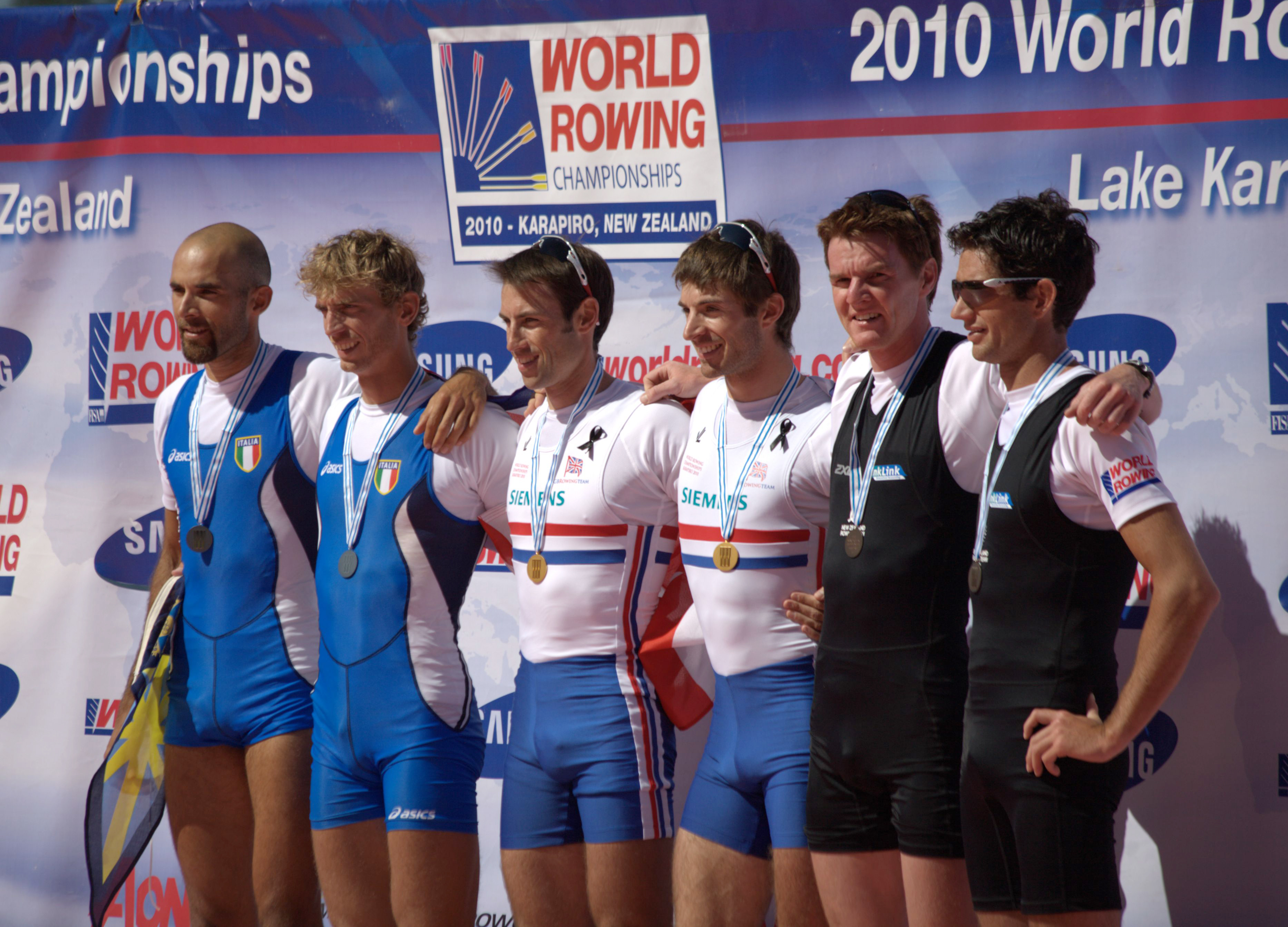
- Berini (first from left) in 2010.

Personal information
- Nationality: Italian
- Born: 1 June 1976 (age 50) Pontedera, Italy
- Height: 185 cm (6 ft 1 in)
- Weight: 71 kg (157 lb)
- Relatives: Lisa Bertini (sister)

Sport
- Club: Fiamme Oro
Medal record
Men's rowing
Representing Italy
Olympic Games
Bronze medal – third place	2004 Athens	LM4-
World Rowing Championships
Gold medal – first place	1996 Motherwell	LM4x
Gold medal – first place	1998 Cologne	LM4x
Gold medal – first place	2009 Poznań	LM4x
Silver medal – second place	2002 Seville	LM4-
Silver medal – second place	2007 Oberschleißheim	LM1x
Silver medal – second place	2010 Cambridge	LM2x
Bronze medal – third place	1995 Tampere	LM4x
Bronze medal – third place	1999 St. Catharines	LM8+
Bronze medal – third place	2003 Milan	LM4-
Bronze medal – third place	2005 Kaizu	LM4-
Bronze medal – third place	2011 Bled	LM2x

Lorenzo Bertini (born 1 June 1976 in Pontedera) is an Italian rower. His sister Lisa Bertini is also an Olympic rower.
