= Anders Christensson =

Swedish rower

Personal information
- Full name: Anders Tommy Christensson
- Nationality: Swedish
- Born: 7 March 1973 (age 52); Strövelstorp, Sweden

Sport
- Sport: Rowing

Anders Tommy Christensson (born 7 March 1973) is a Swedish rower. He competed in the men's lightweight double sculls event at the 1996 Summer Olympics.
