= Rob Hamill =

New Zealand rower & politician (born 1964)

Rob Hamill MNZM
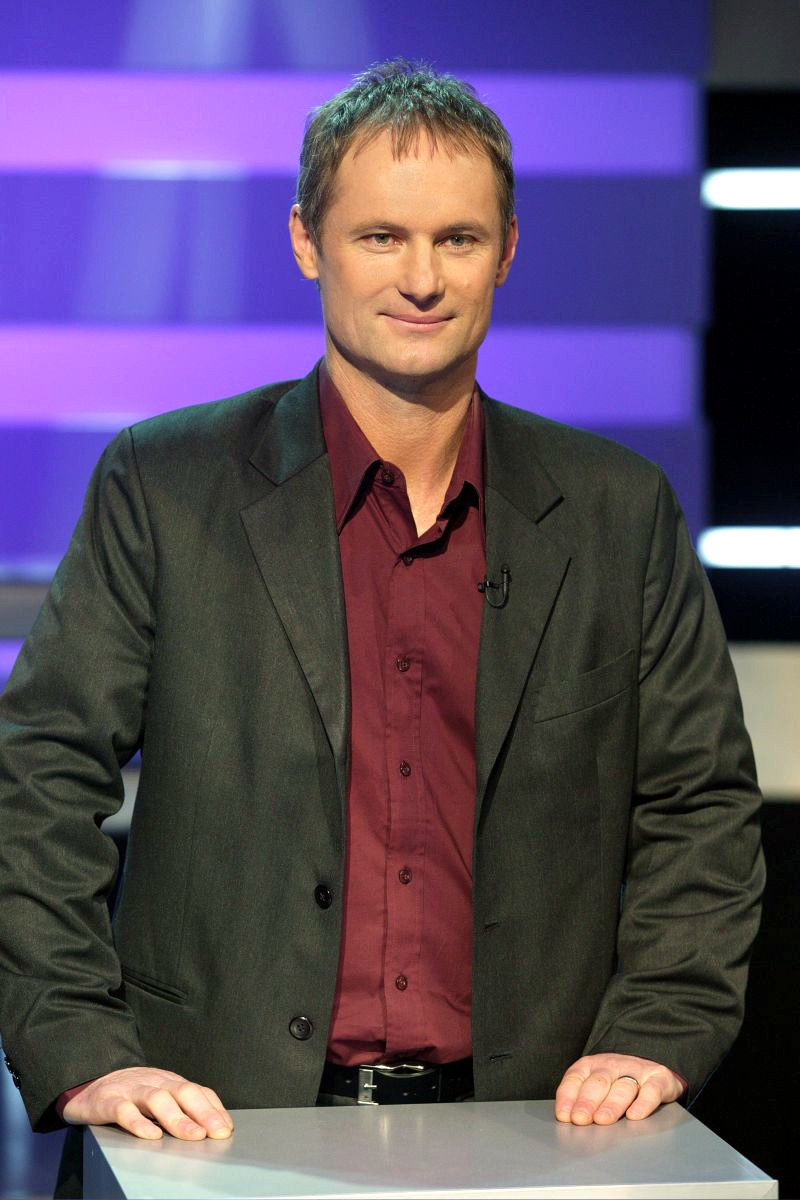

Personal information
- Full name: Robert Miles Hamill
- Born: 4 January 1964 (age 62) Whakatāne, New Zealand
- Spouse: Rachel
- Website: www.robhamill.com

Sport
- Country: New Zealand
- Sport: Rowing
Medal record
Representing New Zealand
Men's rowing
World Championships
| Silver medal – second place | 1994 Eagle Creek Park | LM2x |

Robert Miles Hamill MNZM (born 4 January 1964), also known as Robbie Hamill, is a former New Zealand rower and political candidate. He came to public attention when, in 1994, he won a silver medal in the World Rowing Championships. He went on to win the first Atlantic Rowing Race in 1997.

Hamill was a candidate at the 2008 general election for the Green Party. However, he was not elected. His oldest brother, Kerry, was imprisoned and killed by members of the Khmer Rouge in 1978, after straying into Cambodian waters. Rob testified in court against the leader of the prison, Duch, in 2009.

== Early life ==
Rob Hamill was born on 4 January 1964 in Whakatāne, Bay of Plenty.

Hamill considers boxer Muhammad Ali his role model, "his skill, athleticism, courage, arrogance and self-belief all had a huge influence."

== Rowing career ==
At the 1994 World Rowing Championships at Eagle Creek Park, Indianapolis, United States, Hamill won a silver medal in the lightweight men's double sculls with Mike Rodger. Hamill also took part in the 1996 Atlanta Summer Olympics on behalf of New Zealand.

=== Atlantic Rowing Race ===
He is most well known for his winning of the inaugural Atlantic Rowing Race with Phil Stubbs in 1997, with a world record time of forty-one days, two hours and fifty-five minutes. In the 1999 New Year Honours, Hamill and Stubbs were both appointed Members of the New Zealand Order of Merit, for services to ocean rowing; however Stubbs died in a plane crash before the honours were officially announced. Hamill wrote a book about this experience, The Naked Rower. In the next two such races, in 2001 and 2003, Hamill managed the New Zealand teams who won those races.

=== Other involvements ===
Hamill achieved a world record on an indoor rowing machine, and established and co-organises The Great Race. He also set up a trans-Tasman race in 2008, which he hopes to become biennial, and manages rowing teams.

== Politics ==
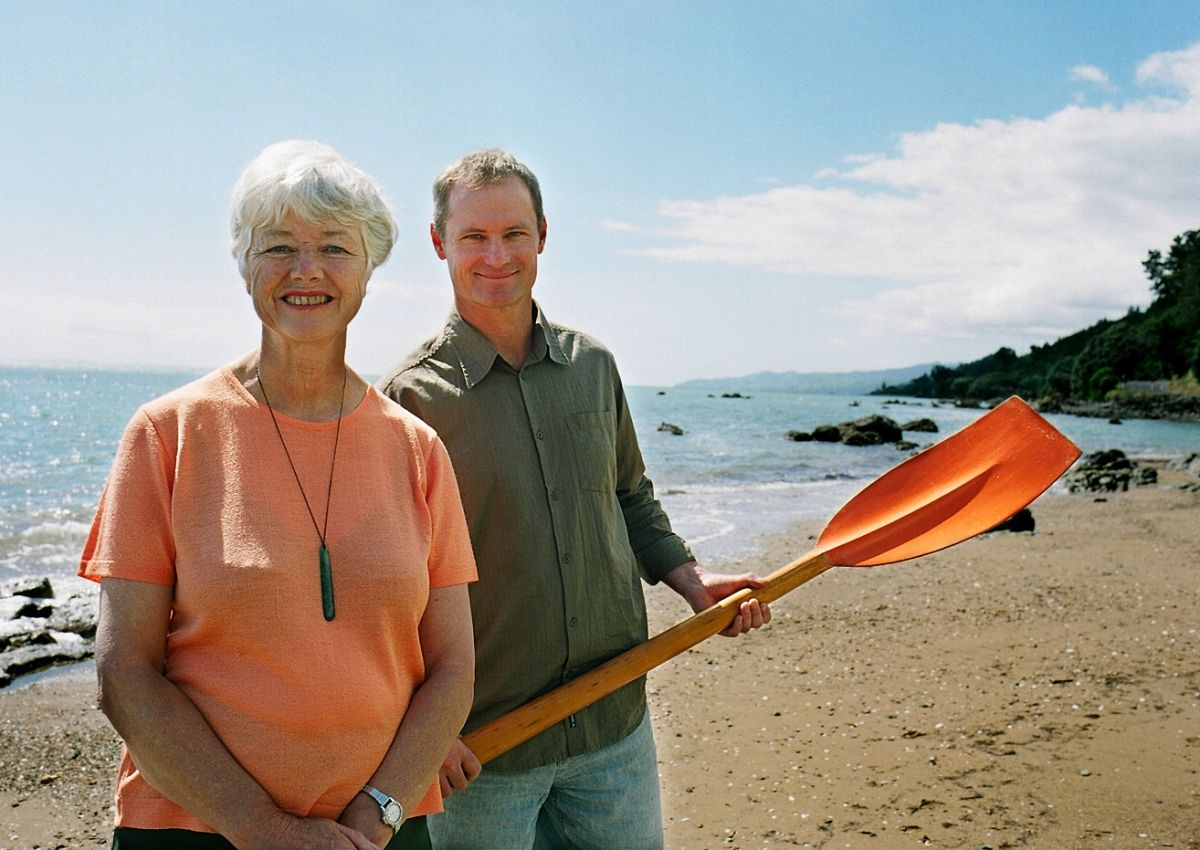
Rob Hamill with former Green Party co-leader, Jeanette Fitzsimons

Hamill stood in the Taranaki-King Country electorate in the 2008 New Zealand general election for the Green Party of Aotearoa New Zealand, and at 56 on the Green party list. He came third, with 8.41% of the vote, and losing to the incumbent, National's Shane Ardern. However, he stated that his intention was not to win the seat, and did not "think that would be realistic." but campaigned for the Green party vote. Hamill describes the Green Party as "the only party with a commitment to driving policy towards a sustainable future".

Hamill is a supporter of New Zealand becoming a republic, endorsing Member of Parliament Keith Locke's Head of State Referenda Bill, a private member's bill.

Hamill was an ambassador for WWF's Earth Hour in 2010.

He is a member of the WEL Energy Trust, and is considering standing for Environment Waikato in the 2010 local body elections.

== Brother's death ==
While on a trip from Singapore to Bangkok, Hamill's older brother, Kerry, was captured, tortured, interrogated and killed in the S-21 prison by the Khmer Rouge in 1978, after being caught in a storm on his yacht, Foxy Lady, and straying into Cambodian waters. He was aged 28 at the time of his death. Hamill was 14 when he learned of his brother's fate. The news of his brother's fate caused Hamill's other older brother, John, to commit suicide. In July 2009 Hamill testified against Duch, the leader of the prison, in the Extraordinary Chambers in the Courts of Cambodia, and Kerry Hamill's alleged killer, who was on trial for crimes against humanity and premeditated murder. Hamill called the experience as "going to be quite scary" and "an opportunity to find [information] out", but stipulated that he is against the death penalty, and did not want to see Duch killed, but that an ideal sentence would be forty years of imprisonment, "anything less than that would be a victory to the [Duch] defence team, I suspect".

Hamill also wants to research Kerry's last few days in Northern Territory, asking Darwinians for any "precious" information about him, saying that "just anything would help".

=== Aftermath ===
Hamill's search for his brother's story has been made into a documentary film entitled Brother Number 1, funded by NZ On Air and TV3, and the New Zealand Film Commission, directed by Annie Goldson, and produced by Hamill, Goldson and James Bellamy. It was pitched at the Hot Docs Canadian International Documentary Festival in Toronto.

The death of his brother, Kerry, inspired him to become an ambassador of WWF and to oppose human trafficking.
