= Emily Dirksen =

American rower (born 1969)

Emily Dirksen (born April 28, 1969) is an American rower. In the 1996 World Rowing Championships, she won a gold medal in the women's coxless four event.
