= Berit Christoffersen =

Danish rower

Medal record

Women's rowing

Representing Denmark

World Rowing Championships
Silver medal – second place	1995 Tampere	LW2x

Berit Christoffersen (born 3 May 1973, in Virum) is a Danish rower. Along with Lene Andersson she finished 5th in the women's lightweight double sculls at the 1996 Summer Olympics.
