= Brendan Dolan (rower) =

Irish rower

Personal information
- Nationality: Irish
- Born: 30 November 1966 (age 58); Dublin, Ireland

Sport
- Sport: Rowing

Brendan Dolan (born 30 November 1966) is an Irish rower. He competed in the men's lightweight double sculls event at the 1996 Summer Olympics.
