= Giovanni Bertini =

Italian footballer (1951–2019)

Personal information
- Date of birth: 7 January 1951
- Place of birth: Rome, Italy
- Date of death: 3 December 2019 (aged 68)
- Place of death: Rome, Italy
- Height: 1.81 m (5 ft 11 in)
- Position: Defender

Senior career*
Years	Team	Apps	(Gls)
1969–1974	Roma	29	(0)
1971–1972	→ Arezzo (loan)	7	(0)
1974	Taranto	3	(0)
1974–1975	Ascoli	15	(0)
1975–1976	Fiorentina	10	(0)
1976–1980	Catania	84	(7)
1980–1982	Benevento	41	(0)

International career
1970	Italy U-21	1	(0)
- * Club domestic league appearances and goals

Giovanni "Giovannone" Bertini (7 January 1951 – 3 December 2019) was an Italian professional footballer who played as a defender.

== Career ==
Bertini was born in Rome, and began playing youth football with Ostiense before signing with A.S. Roma at the age of 18. He made his professional debut in Serie A in a 2–2 draw against Fiorentina on 14 December 1969, and went on to collect six appearances in his first season, and three in his second season. He remained with the club until 1974, aside from a brief loan spell with Serie B side Arezzo in 1971, with whom he collected seven league appearances. After returning to Roma the following season, he made 20 more appearances for the club, before being sold to Taranto in 1974. Later that same year, he joined Ascoli Calcio 1898 under manager Carlo Mazzone, while he left for Fiorentina the following season, collecting 10 appearances in his only season with the club. In total, he played for six seasons (54 games, no goals) in the Italian Serie A, for Roma, Ascoli, and Fiorentina, also collecting 29 appearances in Serie B. He later also made 84 appearances for Catania, 65 of which came in Serie C, scoring seven goals, and obtained 41 appearances for Benevento over two seasons, before retiring in 1982.

== Style of play ==
Bertini was a strong and physically imposing defender, who was also known for his exuberant character, leadership, tenacity, and personality. He usually played as a man-marking centre-back, known as a "stopper" in Italian. He was also known for his goalscoring ability as a defender, courtesy of his heading accuracy – which made him an aerial threat – as well as his powerful shot with either foot, including from free kicks.

== Later life, illness, and death ==
Following his retirement, Bertini worked as a pundit for several broadcasting corporations, including TV2000. He was diagnosed with Amyotrophic lateral sclerosis in 2016. He died on 3 December 2019, in Rome, at the age of 68.

== Personal life ==
Bertini had a daughter, Benedetta.
