= Jan Hansen (rower) =

Danish rower

Personal information
- Born: 18 February 1970 (age 56)

Sport
- Sport: Rowing
Medal record
Men's rowing
Representing Denmark
World Rowing Championships
Gold medal – first place	1992 Montreal	Lwt eight

Jan Hansen (born 18 February 1970) is a Danish lightweight rower. He won a gold medal at the 1992 World Rowing Championships in Montreal with the lightweight men's eight.
