= Derksen =

Derksen is a Dutch surname which means son of Derk/Dirk, and may refer to:

- Dirk Jan Derksen (born 1972), Dutch footballer
- Geert-Jan Derksen (born 1975), Dutch rower
- Jan Derksen (1919–2011), Dutch cyclist
- Johan Derksen (born 1949), Dutch footballer and sports journalist (editor-in-chief of Voetbal International)
- Kristina Tesser Derksen, Canadian politician
- Piet Derksen (1913–1996), Dutch businessman and founder of Center Parcs
- Rick Derksen, (born 1964) Dutch linguist
- Rob Derksen (1960–2004), American professional baseball pitcher
- Robert-Jan Derksen (born 1974), Dutch golfer
