= Ulmus 'Pyramidalis Bertini' =

Elm cultivar

- Genus: Ulmus
- Cultivar: 'Pyramidalis Bertini'
- Origin: Europe

The elm cultivar Ulmus 'Pyramidalis Bertini' was listed by Lavallée without description in 1877 as Ulmus campestris var. pyramidalis Bertini. It is considered "possibly Ulmus carpinifolia" (: U. minor) by Green.

== Cultivation ==
No specimens are known to have survived.
