= Karsten Nielsen =

Danish rower

Medal record

Men's rowing

Representing Denmark

World Rowing Championships
Gold medal – first place	1996 Strathclyde	LM1x
Gold medal – first place	1997 Aiguebelette	LM1x
Gold medal – first place	1999 St. Catharines	LM1x
Bronze medal – third place	1994 Indianapolis	LM1x
Bronze medal – third place	1998 Cologne	LM1x

Karsten Nielsen (born 23 May 1973 in Skælskør) is a Danish rower.
