= Grzegorz Wdowiak =

Polish rower

Personal information
- Nationality: Polish
- Born: 20 November 1970 (age 54); Warsaw, Poland

Sport
- Sport: Rowing

Grzegorz Wdowiak (born 20 November 1970) is a Polish rower. He competed in the men's lightweight double sculls event at the 1996 Summer Olympics.
