= Lisa Bertini =

Italian rower

Personal information
- Nationality: Italian
- Born: 22 February 1972 (age 53); Pisa, Italy
- Relatives: Lorenzo Bertini (brother)

Sport
- Sport: Rowing

Lisa Bertini (born 22 February 1972) is an Italian rower. She competed in the women's lightweight double sculls event at the 1996 Summer Olympics. Her brother Lorenzo Bertini is also an Olympic rower.
