= Tommaso Audisio =

Italian priest, student of architecture

Tommaso Audisio (1789–1845) was an Italian priest, student of architecture, and an amateur practitioner of the art.

He was born in Moncalvo, a town near Asti in north-west Italy, in 1789. By profession he was a churchman, parish priest of Villadeati from 1817 until his death. But he is better remembered for his architectural and interior design projects which included a number of churches and furnishings for churches.

Audasio was also responsible for the design of the new seat of the Biblioteca del Seminario in piazza Calabiana, Casale Monferrato (1838). The most important project which has been attributed to him, however, is the Castello di Belvedere at Villadeati. This was commissioned by Giacinto Magrelli as a villa-castle to replace the ancient fortress which dominated the hill-town. Stylistically it is noted for incorporating baroque elements into a neoclassical layout.
