= Lene Andersson =

Danish rower (born 1968)

Medal record

Women's rowing

Representing Denmark

World Championships
Silver medal – second place	1995 Tampere	LW2x
Silver medal – second place	1997 Aiguebelette	LW2x

Lene Skov Andersson (born 17 July 1968) is a Danish rower. Along with Berit Christoffersen she finished 5th in the women's lightweight double sculls at the 1996 Summer Olympics.
