= Amy Turner (rower) =

American rower

Amy Turner is an American rower. In the 1996 World Rowing Championships, she won a gold medal in the women's coxless four event.
