= Mattias Tichy =

Swedish rower

Medal record

Men's rowing

Representing Sweden

World Rowing Championships
Silver medal – second place	1995 Tampere	LM2x

Mattias Tichy (born 12 October 1974 in Fristad) is a Swedish rower.
