= Ruth Kaps =

German rower (born 1968)

Personal information
- Born: 20 February 1968 (age 58) Giessen, West Germany

Sport
- Sport: Rowing
Medal record
Women's rowing
Representing Germany
World Championships
Bronze medal – third place	1995 Tampere	LW2x

Ruth Kaps (born 20 February 1968 in Giessen) is a former German lightweight rower.

She competed at the 1996 Summer Olympics.
