= Ana Sofía Soberanes =

Mexican rower (born 1977)

Personal information
- Full name: Ana Sofía Soberanes González
- Born: 9 April 1977 (age 49) Mexico City, Mexico

Sport
- Sport: Rowing
Medal record
Representing Mexico
Pan American Games
Bronze medal – third place	1995 Mar del Plata	Lightweight double sculls

Ana Sofía Soberanes González (born 9 April 1977) is a Mexican former rower. She competed at the 1996 Summer Olympics and the 2000 Summer Olympics.
