= Camelia Macoviciuc-Mihalcea =

Romanian rower

Personal information
- Born: 1 March 1968 (age 58) Hudești, Botoșani County, Romania
Medal record
Women's rowing
Representing Romania
Olympic Games
Gold medal – first place	1996 Atlanta	LW2x
World Championships
Gold medal – first place	1999 St. Catharines	LW2x
Bronze medal – third place	1997 Aiguebelette	LW2x
Bronze medal – third place	1998 Cologne	LW2x

Camelia Macoviciuc-Mihalcea (born 1 March 1968) is a Romanian rower.
