= Nicholas Strange (rower) =

British rower

Personal information
- Full name: Nicholas Bucket Dimitri Strange
- Nationality: Irish
- Born: 15 August 1966 (age 59) Canterbury, England

Sport
- Sport: Rowing

Nicholas Strange (born 15 August 1966) is a British rower. He competed in the men's lightweight double sculls event at the 1996 Summer Olympics. Nick also coached at the Beijing and London games, and now coaches Abingdon School U15 B crew.
