= Michael Gier =

Swiss rower

Personal information
- Born: 19 July 1967 (age 58) Goldach, Switzerland
- Height: 183 cm (6 ft 0 in)
- Weight: 72 kg (159 lb)
- Relatives: Markus Gier (brother)

Sport
- Sport: Rowing
- Club: Seeclub Rorschach
Medal record
Representing Switzerland
Men's rowing
Olympic Games
Gold medal – first place	1996 Atlanta	Lwt double sculls

Michael Gier (born 19 July 1967) is a Swiss competition rower and Olympic champion.

Gier and his brother Markus won a gold medal in lightweight double sculls at the 1996 Summer Olympics. The brothers also competed at the 2000 Summer Olympics in Sydney where they finished fifth.
