= Moomba Festival =

Labour Day festival in Melbourne, Australia

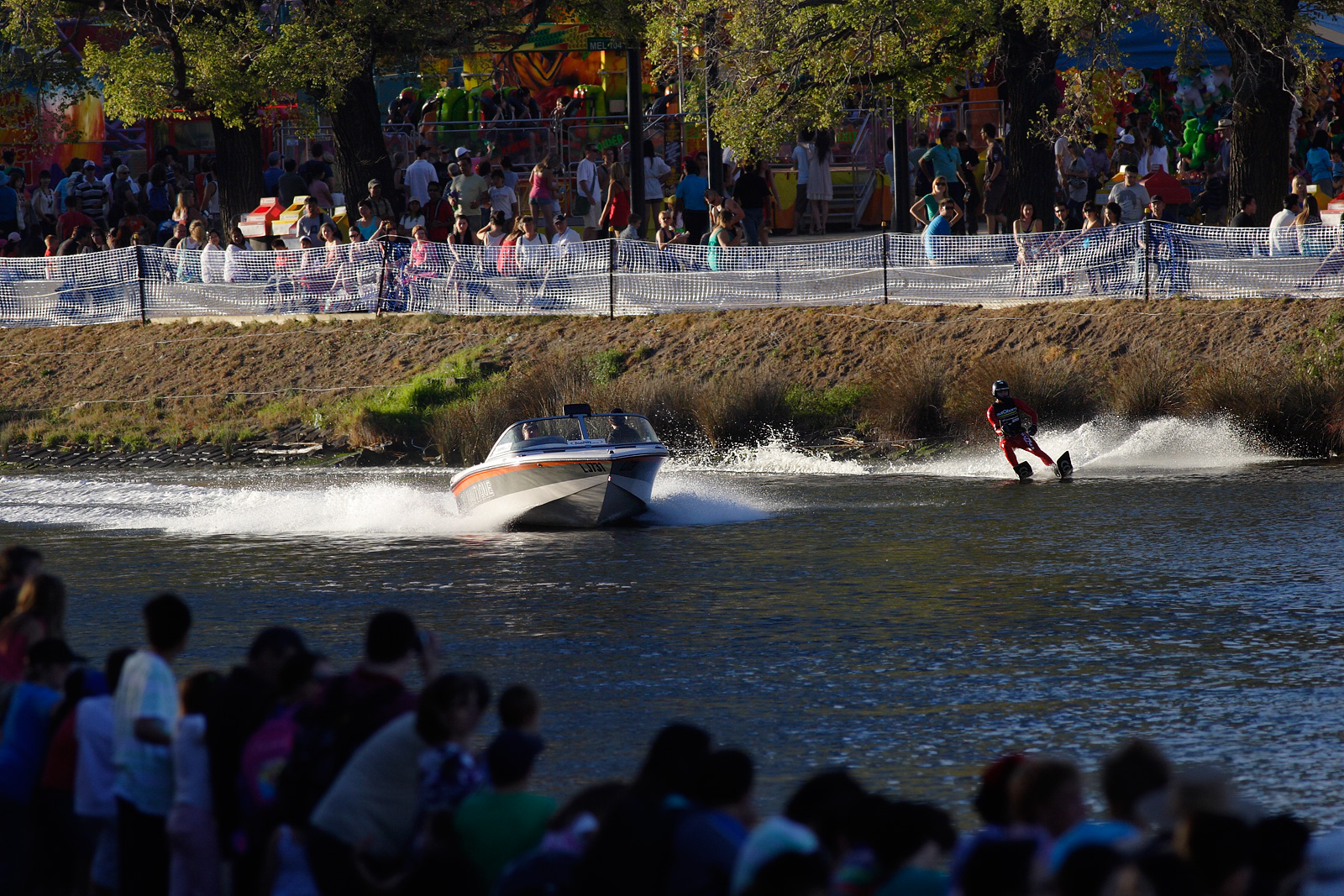
- Waterskiing events at Moomba
- Genre: Carnival
- Begins: Labour Day long weekend (second Monday in March)
- Frequency: annual
- Locations: Melbourne, Australia
- Years active: 71
- Inaugurated: 1955
- Previous event: 2020
- Attendance: 3.8 million (2.3 million tourists; record, set in 2018)
- Organiser: City of Melbourne
- Website: moomba.melbourne.vic.gov.au

Moomba (also known as the Moomba Festival) is held annually in Melbourne, Australia. Run by the City of Melbourne, it is Australia's largest free community festival. The Melburnian tradition is celebrated over four days, incorporating the Labour Day long weekend, from Friday to the second Monday in March. Moomba is culturally important to Melbourne, having been celebrated since 1955, and regularly attracts up to a million people, with a record attendance of 3.8 million (2.3 million tourists) set in 2018.

In 2003, the event was renamed Melbourne Moomba Waterfest.

Traditional events include the Moomba parade, crowning of Moomba monarchs, fireworks displays, carnivals in the gardens along the river, river activities including watersports, water floats and the Birdman Rally, as well as live music and bands.

In 2021, the usual Moomba was cancelled by Melbourne City Council, for the first time ever, due to events and issues related to the COVID-19 pandemic in Australia. However "Moomba 2.0" events were held on 5–8 March. In 2024, a forecast of extremely hot weather caused the Moomba Parade to be cancelled.

== Origins ==
In 1951, Australia celebrated fifty years of Federation with a parade and the staging of the theatre production An Aboriginal Moomba: Out of the Dark. In 1954, Queen Elizabeth II visited the city for the first time as reigning monarch, and the City Development Association and the Melbourne City Council proposed an autumn carnival to be called "Moomba".

A committee was formed in July 1954 to organise and fund the event, successfully allocating £10,000 to its inaugural running. Before the event's first year, controversy was created when Labor Councillor Frank Williams resigned from the committee, branding the planned carnival as a "Bourke street joke for the benefit of shopkeepers". A promotional theme song "Come to Melbourne for the Moomba" was written by Jack O'Hagan.

== Etymology ==
The festival was originally named Moomba in the mistaken belief it was an indigenous word meaning 'a happy get-together.' Credit is usually given to Bill Onus, a unionist and member of the Australian Aborigines' League for proposing the term, which he used in a play, Aboriginal Moomba in 1951. In 1969 Luise Hercus glossed the word mum (rhyming with 'vroom') as meaning 'bottom, rump', and suggested mum-ba meant something like 'bottom and..', and had been introduced from Healesville usage as a joke. In 1981 Barry Blake analysed the word as combining as mum (anus) and –ba, a locative suffix meaning 'at, in, on'. This would give the sense of 'up your bum/arse'.

Onus himself, according to his daughter-in-law, who said she had heard the story from Onus's wife Mary, had picked up the word from a word list of indigenous terms. Some say he did it to get back at the city council for having deliberately upstaged the traditional Labour Day march with a popular carnival. Lin Onus, his son, stated that indeed his father had intended to play a prank in passing on the word with this sense.

== Event history ==
The first Moomba was a 15-day festival officially opened on 12 March 1955 by the State Governor, Sir Dallas Brooks. The inaugural programme included a fireworks display, parade, vintage car display, Henley rowing regatta, river floats including a "Lord Mayor's houseboat", cycling race, tennis at Kooyong, concerts including performances by the Victorian Symphony Orchestra and Royal Philharmonic choir, crowning of the Queen of Moomba and riverside carnival. 25,000 turned out to watch the inaugural Moomba parade down Swanston Street. The first Moomba was heavily criticised by Melbourne's conservative establishment, including the Anglican Church, which at the time claimed it was hedonistic and embodying social decay. Council responded to the criticism citing that Moomba was intended to be a festival for families and as such is reinforcing family values in society.

One of the popular events associated with Moomba was the Herald Sun Outdoor Art Show in the Treasury Gardens.

After the 2016 Moomba festival fireworks there was a large-scale brawl in and around Federation Square in Melbourne's Central Business District, in which young people and the police fought each other. The violence was blamed in the press on the supposed Apex, and became a trigger for the African gangs moral panic in the lead up to the Victorian state election of 2018.

=== 2021 – Moomba 2.0 ===
In 2021, the usual Moomba events were cancelled by Melbourne City Council, for the first time ever, due to COVID-19 restrictions and Victoria's third lockdown in February. The Moomba Parade and the Birdman Rally were already cancelled.

Instead of the normal festival attractions, Lord Mayor Sally Capp said Moomba 2.0 will be: "... a series of fun, family friendly events and attractions across the city that will help bring the buzz back to Melbourne." There was ticketing and COVID-safe marshals at all sites. Moomba 2.0 was a COVID-safe event.

== Events ==
=== Parade and floats ===
A parade (or "procession") and floats through the streets of Melbourne have been a key part of the Moomba festival since its beginning. Each year it attracts over 100,000 people to Melbourne's city centre as well as being shown on free-to-air television in Melbourne.

The first Moomba procession was held in 1955. It was first televised in 1957, the year after the Melbourne 1956 Olympics.

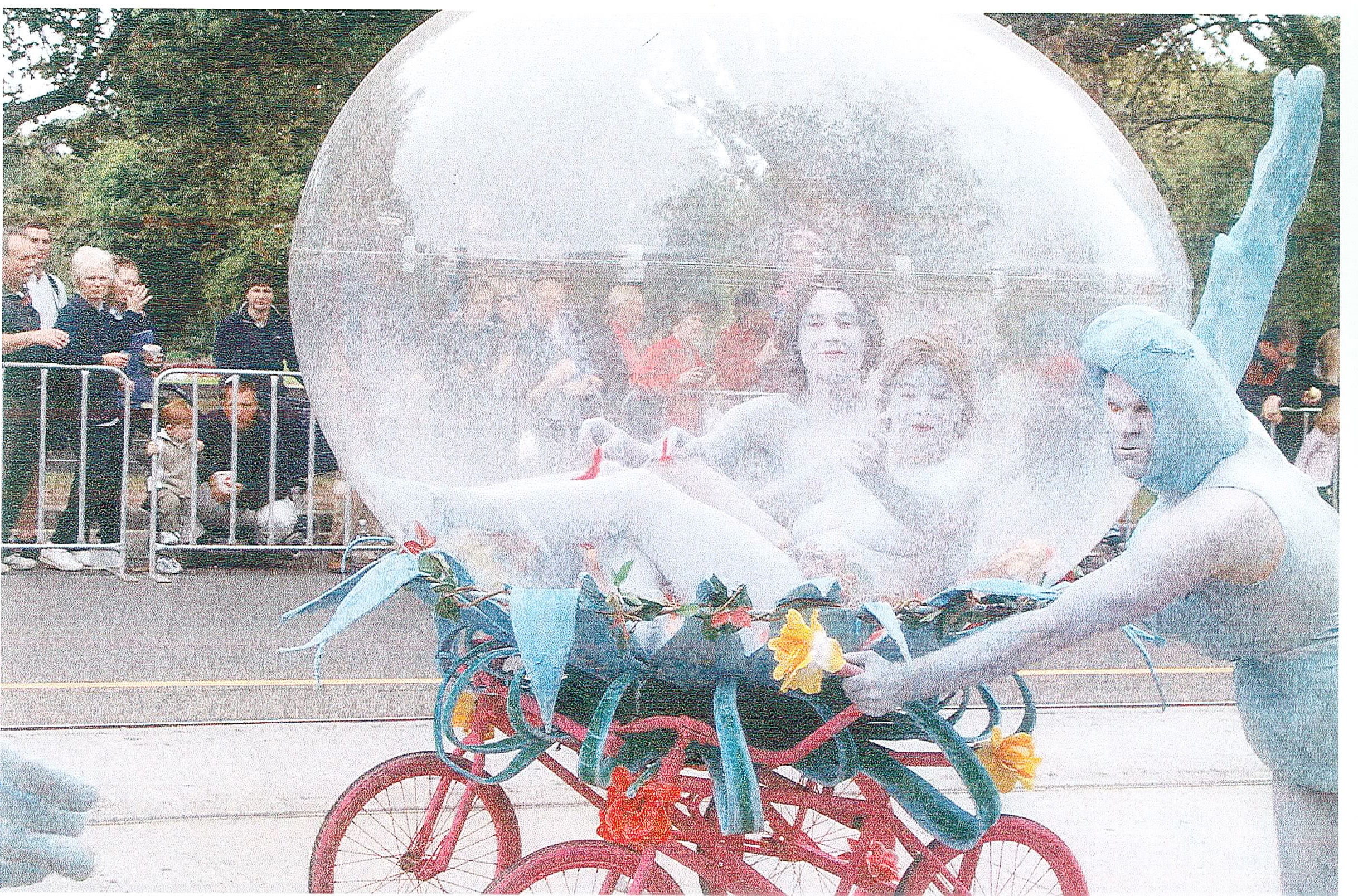
Snuff Puppets float Moomba Parade 2001

The floats have an annual theme, usually an elaboration on "Let's get together and have fun", the avowed mission and vision statement of Moomba and are usually from sister cities (of which Melbourne has six), schools and community groups. They also promote some aspect of the arts, like singing, dancing, or design. Swanston Street is the traditional home of the floats and spine of the city and horse- or tractor-drawn floats use the tram tracks. Decorated trams are sometimes also featured.

In 2001, the parade came under media controversy when a French Troupe and Melbourne's Snuff Puppets had floats with naked people covered in body paint.

In 2024, the parade, in its 70th year, was cancelled due to a heatwave with forecast temperatures from the high 30s to low 40s°C.

=== Moomba monarchy ===
The Moomba monarchy has been one of the most celebrated and controversial components of the festival over the years.

==== Queens of Moomba (1955–1987) ====
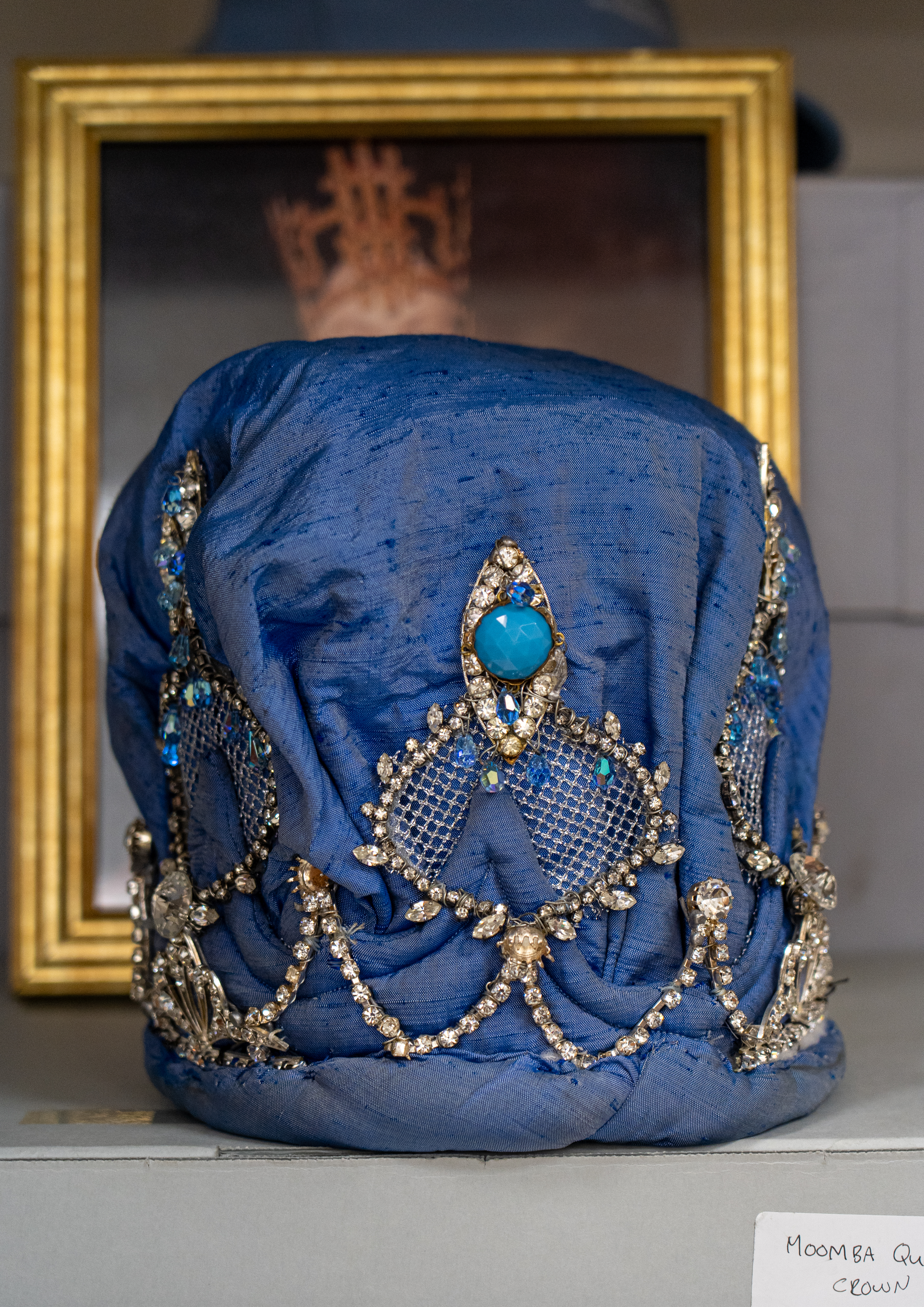
A crown worn by Queens of Moomba, circa 1980s.

The first Moomba monarchs were the Queens of Moomba, awarded from the inaugural festival in 1955. The role was decided by a beauty pageant competition. It was awarded for the last time in 1987, as a new gender-neutral monarch position was established and the beauty pageant was abolished.

Notably, 1966 Moomba Queen Erica McMillan was killed in a car accident seven weeks after the festival, in the car which she had received as a prize for being voted Queen.

Year	Queen
1955	Beverley Stewart
1956	Fay Chapman
1957	Patricia Bramwell
1958	Norma Jones
1959	Honni Freger
1960	Pat Tudor
1961	Rhonda Parker
1962	Gillian Munro
1963	Anne Maree Cafarella
1964	Ria Luyben
1965	Pauline Verey
1966	Erica McMillan
1967	Patsy Earp
1968	Judy Fenelon
1969	Janine Forbes
1970	Fiona Ross
1971	Carolyn Gibbs
1972	Debbi Scott
1973	Janice Bridgeford
1974	Marianne Perrott
1975	Aurora Laurins
1976	Julie Costa
1977	Sharyn Duncan
1978	Deanna DeBona
1979	Michelle Worsley
1980	Elizabeth Egan
1981	Kim Formosa
1982	Sharon McKenzie
1983	Linda Knight
1984	Kim Kermonde
1985	Anne Erickson
1986	Ingrid Johansen
1987	Marita Jones

==== Kings of Moomba (1967–1987) ====
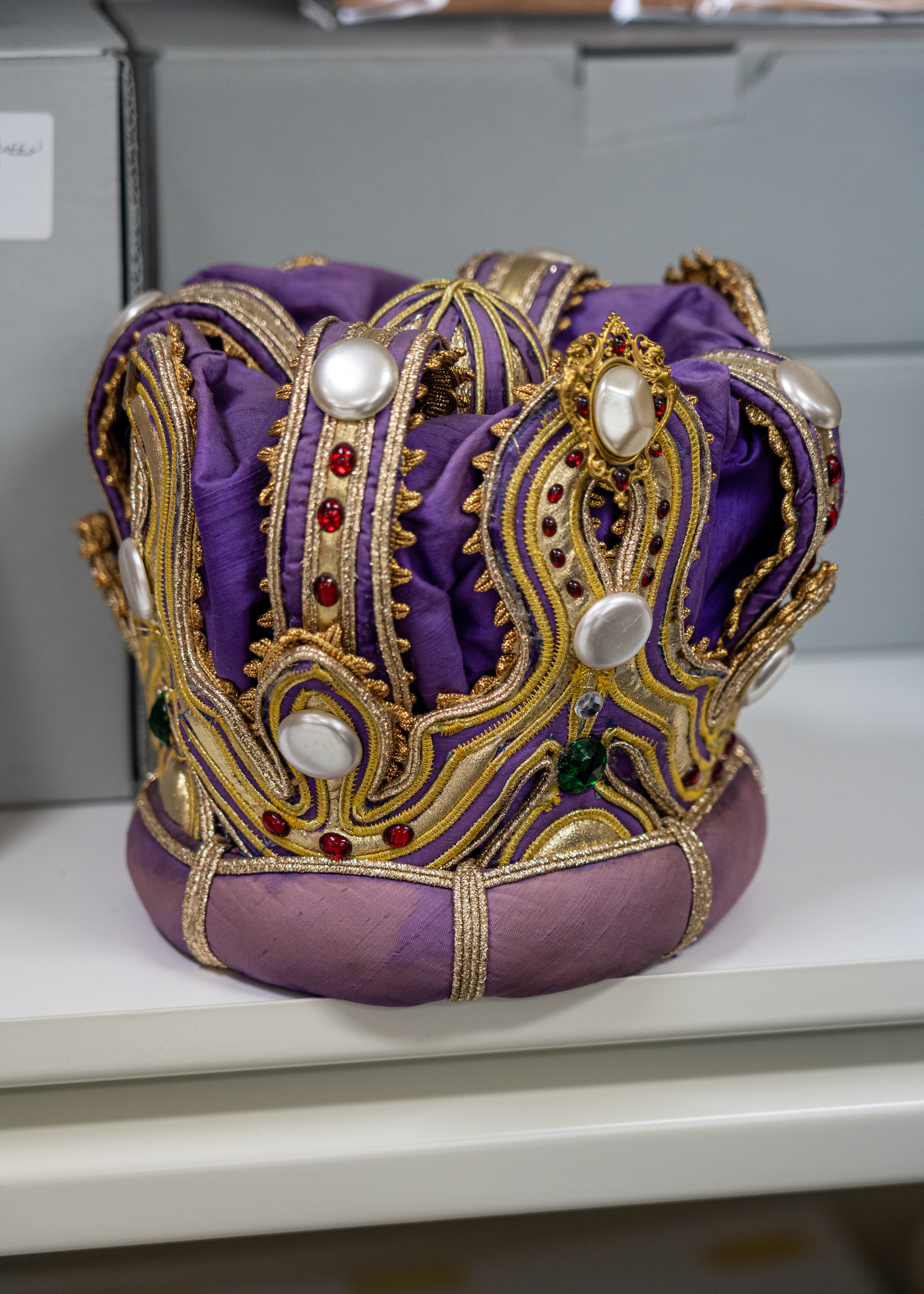
A crown worn by Kings of Moomba, circa 1980s.

Kings of Moomba were named beginning in 1967. The role was awarded to male celebrities. It too was abolished following the 1987 festival as the gender-neutral monarch was introduced.

Occasionally, a "court jester" was also named to accompany the king.

Key
Court jester

Year	King	Nationality	Notability
1967	Robert Morley	United Kingdom	Actor
1968	Alfred Marks	United Kingdom	Actor
1969	Tito Gobbi (Note: Gobbi rejected the role after negative feedback, before "return[ing] to his throne" six days later.)	Italy	Opera singer
1970	Johnny Famechon	Australia	Boxer
1971	Oleg Popov	Soviet Union	Clown
1972	Johnny Farnham	Australia	Singer
1972	Lou Richards	Australia	Australian rules footballer
1973	Douglas Nicholls	Australia	Aboriginal Australian rules footballer and pastor
1974	Robert Helpmann	Australia	Ballet dancer
1975	Rolf Harris	Australia	Entertainer
1976	Barry Crocker	Australia	Entertainer
1977	Mickey Mouse	United States	Disney character
1977	Ugly Dave Gray	United Kingdom	Entertainer
1978	Bert Newton	Australia	Entertainer
1979	Graham Kennedy	Australia	Entertainer
1980	Paul Cronin	Australia	Actor
1981	Lou Richards	Australia	Australian rules footballer
1982	Frank Thring	Australia	Actor
1983	Daryl Somers	Australia	Entertainer
1984	Kevin Bartlett	Australia	Australian rules footballer
1985	Molly Meldrum	Australia	Music industry figure
1986	Peter Brock	Australia	Racing driver
1987	Paul McNamee	Australia	Tennis player

==== Moomba Monarchs (1988–1998, 2010–present) ====
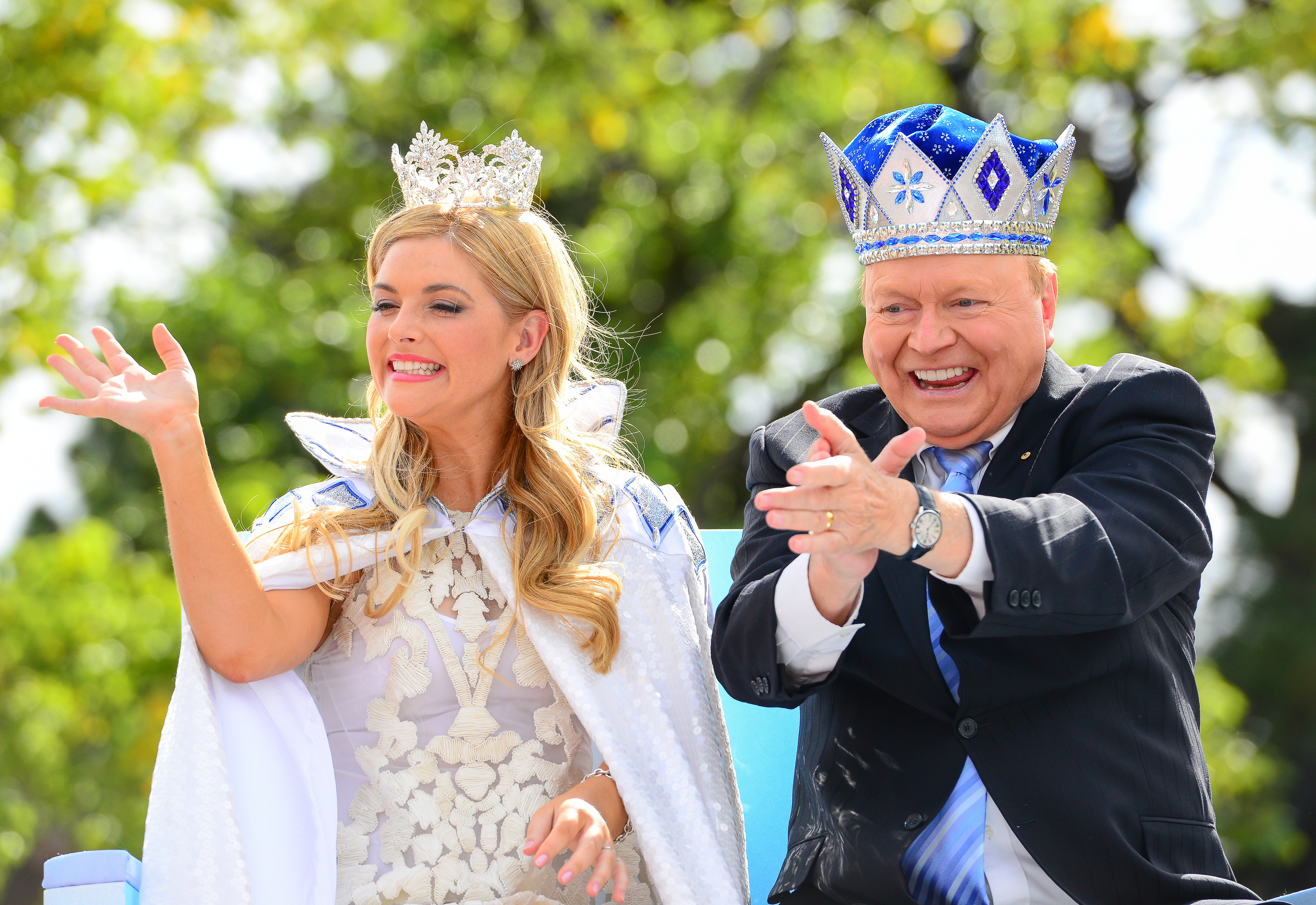
2014 Moomba monarchs Lucy Durack and Bert Newton

In 1988, a gender-neutral Moomba Monarch position was established. Winners are typically celebrities and may be any gender. The first was television presenter Jo Pearson. In 1999, the tradition ended when clowns Zig and Zag were appointed. After it was revealed that, years before, Zig (Jack Perry) had pleaded guilty to child molestation, they were dethroned. In 2010, the tradition was restored, with Molly Meldrum and Kate Ceberano being named King and Queen of Moomba.

On some occasions, non-celebrities have been named for various reasons.

Key
Non-celebrity

Year	Monarch/s	Nationality	Notability
1988	Jo Pearson	Australia	Television presenter
1989	Con "the Fruiterer" Dikaletis	Greece	Character portrayed by Australian actor Mark Mitchell
1990	David Hanison	Australia	Taxi driver
1991	Tony Shaw	Australia	Australian rules footballer
1992	Don Dunstan	Australia	Politician
1993	Oarsome Foursome	Australia	Australian representative men's rowing coxless four crew, consisting of Andrew Cooper, Nick Green, Mike McKay and James Tomkins
1994	Andrew Gaze	Australia	Basketballer
1995	Cathy Freeman	Australia	Sprinter
1996	Marina Prior	Australia	Singer and actor
1997	Lano and Woodley	Australia	Comedy duo, consisting of Colin Lane ("Lano") and Frank Woodley
1998	Denise Drysdale	Australia	Entertainer
1999–2009	No Monarch (Note: Australian clowns Zig and Zag (portrayed by Jack Perry and Doug McKenzie respectively) had been announced as the 1999 Monarchs but not yet crowned when it became publicly known that Perry had sexually assaulted his granddaughter. As a result, the pair were not crowned. There was no replacement Monarch that year, and the concept as a whole was rested until 2010.)		
2010	Kate Ceberano	Australia	Singer
2010	Molly Meldrum	Australia	Music industry figure
2011	Mick Malthouse	Australia	Australian rules football coach
2011	Ruby Rose	Australia	Model and television presenter
2012	Natalie Bassingthwaighte	Australia	Entertainer
2012	Harry Kewell	Australia	Soccer player
2013 (Note: In 2013, eight community and emergency services organisations (Ambulance Victoria, the Country Fire Authority, the Department of Sustainability and Environment, the Metropolitan Fire Brigade, The Salvation Army, St John Ambulance Australia, Victoria Police and Victoria State Emergency Service) were honoured by the monarchy. These were represented by seven monarchs (one of the monarchs represented both ambulance organisations).)	Stephanie Carr	Australia	Department of Sustainability and Environment community engagement facilitator
2013	Karla Challis	Australia	Victoria Police family violence advisor
2013	Alan Eade	Australia	Ambulance Victoria paramedic and St John Ambulance Australia chief commissioner
2013	Sandy Faoro	Australia	Victoria State Emergency Service unit controller
2013	April Himmelreich	Australia	Country Fire Authority volunteer firefighter
2013	Scott McGraw	Australia	Metropolitan Fire Brigade firefighter
2013	Brendan Nottle	Australia	Salvation Army commanding officer
2014	Lucy Durack	Australia	Actor
2014	Bert Newton	Australia	Entertainer
2015	Pallavi Sharda	Australia	Actor
2015	Shane Warne	Australia	Cricketer
2016	Michelle Payne	Australia	Jockey
2016	Stevie Payne	Australia	Michelle Payne's brother and strapper
2017	Guy Grossi	Australia	Chef
2017	Karen Martini	Australia	Chef
2018	Jimmy Giggle	Australia	Children's entertainer
2018	Chrissie Swan	Australia	Television personality
2019	Jane Bunn	Australia	Meteorologist and weather presenter
2019	Archie Thompson	Australia	Soccer player
2020	Nazeem Hussain	Australia	Comedian
2020	Julia Morris	Australia	Entertainer
2021 (Note: In 2021, three workers in roles particularly affected by the COVID-19 pandemic were selected as monarchs.)	Kirsty Buising	Australia	Infectious diseases physician
2021	Pravini Fernando	Australia	Cleaner
2021	Drew Law	Australia	Supermarket worker
2022	Fifi Box	Australia	Radio presenter
2022	Peter Hitchener	Australia	Television presenter
2023	Rhonda Burchmore	Australia	Entertainer
2023	Rob Mills	Australia	Entertainer
2024	Emma Watkins	Australia	Children's entertainer
2024	Peter Helliar	Australia	Comedian
2025	Sooshi Mango	Australia	Comedy troupe consisting of characters Johnny, Sam and Vince, played by Joe Salanitri, Andrew Manfre and Carlo Salanitri respectively
2026	Caterina Mete	Australia	Children's entertainer
2026	Sammy J	Australia	Comedian

==== Queens of the Pacific (1967–1977) ====
The Queen of the Pacific was a title contested by representatives from various countries and administrations from the Pacific and South-East Asian regions. It was decided by a beauty contest. The title was awarded from 1967 to 1977.

Year	Monarch	Representing	Notes
1967	Betty Lim Saw Yim	Malaysia	
1968	Baby Santiago	Philippines	
1969	Hiroko Suzuki	Japan	
1970	Deirdre Bruton	New Zealand	
1971	Nelia Sancho	Philippines	
1972	Abigail Banglos	Hawaii	
1973	Irene Rebecca Soetanto	Indonesia	Runner Up of Ratu Indonesia (Queen of Indonesia) 1973
1974	Doris Dodge	California	
1975	Fransisca Warastoeti	Indonesia	Winner of Puteri Indonesia (Miss Indonesia) 1975
1976	Suzie Cross	Australia	
1977	Lei Maa	Hawaii	

==== Young Ambassadors (2003–200?) ====
The title of "Young Ambassador" was awarded during part of the period during which no monarchs were named (1999 to 2009). It was first awarded in 2003.

Year	Ambassador	Notability
2003	Carrie Stoney	Ultramarathoner supporting Beyond Blue (mental health)
2004	Sam Quinn	Australian Deaflympian basketballer
2005	Alan Wu	Youth advocate
2006	Natalie Bassingthwaighte	Entertainer
2007	Trisha Broadbridge	Boxing Day tsunami survivor and youth leader

From approximately 1981 to 1988 there were also instances where Moomba included a Prince and Princess of Moomba designation consisting of two children chosen through a competition held by local radio station 3KZ.

=== Fireworks ===
Fireworks are a big part of the Moomba festival and large displays occur on every night of the festival. The fireworks are above the Yarra river.

=== Carnival ===
A traditional carnival including a ferris wheel are held in the Alexandra Gardens along the river bank. In recent years, the carnival has extended to Birrarung Marr across the river. It is popular with children, and corn dogs and doughnut stands line the paths.

=== River activities ===
Moomba particularly celebrates the Yarra River, which has been much maligned during the history of the city until the last few decades.

==== Water skiing ====
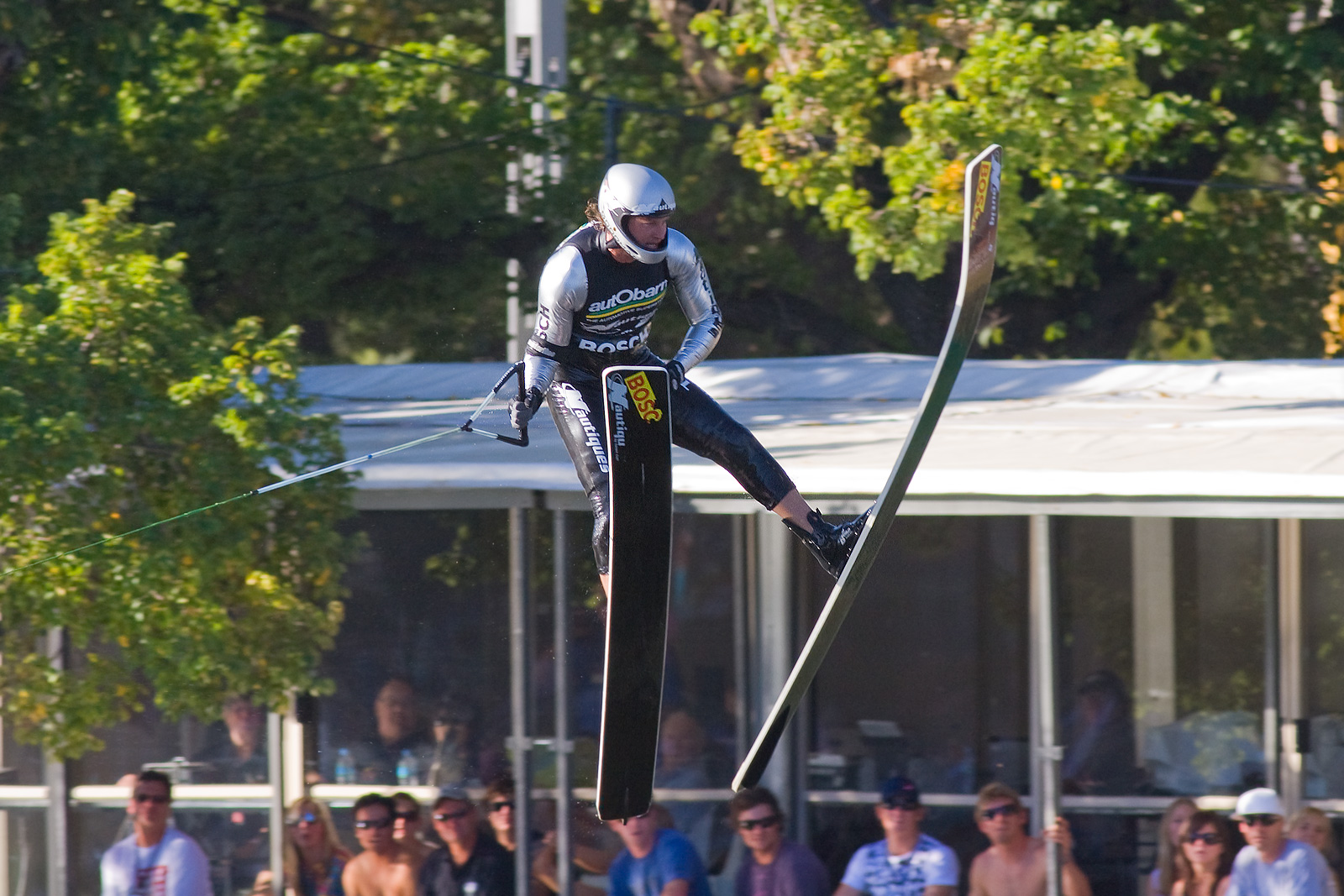
Water stunts

Water skiing in the Yarra was introduced to Moomba in 1959. The tournament has both Junior and Open divisions, with the finals crowning the Moomba Masters Champions on Moomba Monday.

==== River floats ====
The festival has featured Chinese dragon boats and the Moomba Showboat.

==== Birdman rally ====
Among the more popular events is the Birdman Rally, begun in 1976, which is traditionally held at the Swan Street Bridge over the Yarra River. However it has been held only intermittently during Moomba's history. It was stopped for a number of years due to high levels of E. coli contamination of the Yarra. Subsequent clean-ups reduced pollution to acceptable levels and 2004 saw its return. In 2005, the rally was held in the new inner city park, Birrarung Marr, close to its traditional location.

=== Music and live bands ===
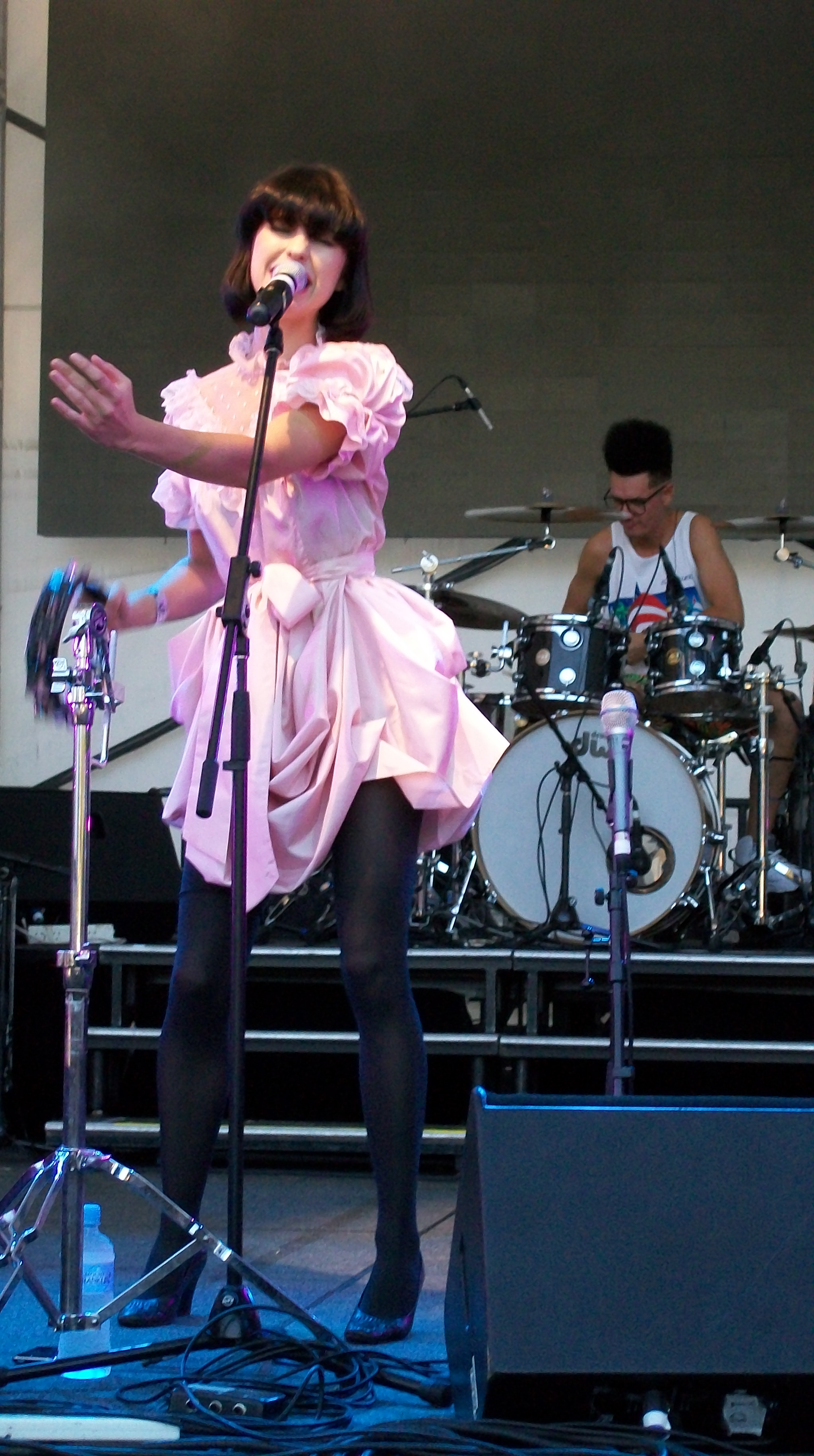
Kimbra performing at Moomba in 2011

Moomba's performers have included international musical acts such as ABBA, Neil Diamond and AC/DC as well as a number of smaller local acts.

In 2012, performers included Tex Perkins and Daryl Braithwaite.

== Other reading ==
Eckersley, M. 2012. 'Australian Indigenous Drama'. Tasman Press. Altona.
