= Andrew Cox =

Australian rower

Personal information
- Born: 10 August 1964 (age 62)
- Education: The King's School
- Occupations: Copywriter; Schoolteacher

Sport
- Sport: Rowing

Achievements and titles
- National finals: King's Cup 1988
Medal record
Representing Australia
Men's rowing
World Rowing U23 Championships
Silver medal – second place	U23 1985 Banyoles	M8+

Andrew Cox (born 10 August 1964) is an Australian former rowing coxswain and former Sydney first grade rugby union head coach. As a cox he was an U23 Australian national champion and later steered Australia's senior lightweight eight at the 1987 World Rowing Championships.

== Club and state rowing ==
Cox was educated at The King's School, Parramatta. In his senior year of 1982 he coxed that school's 1st VIII to victory at the AAGPS Head of the River.

Cox first made state selection in the New South Wales youth eight which contested the Noel Wilkinson trophy at the Interstate Regatta within the 1983 Australian Rowing Championships. He coxed the New South Wales youth eight again in 1984. In 1988 he made the New South Wales men's senior eight which contested the King's Cup at the Interstate Regatta.

At the 1984 Australian Rowing Championships he steered a Mosman/Sydney/SUBC four to victory for the U23 coxed four national title. At those same championships he coxed a Mosman/Sydney/Haberfield eight in a title attempt for the U23 eight championship. In 1987 and 1988 he coxed AIS selection composite crews in the coxed four championship. The 1987 four placed second and the 1988 crew was sixth.

== International representative rowing ==
Cox made his Australian representative debut as coxswain of the Australian U23 eight which competed in the 1985 U23 Trans Tasman series on Lake Ruataniwha in New Zealand. They lost both of their match races against New Zealand. Later that year they contested the 1985 World Rowing U23 Championships in Banyoles, Spain. There, that crew which contained three future world champions (McKay, Cooper and Batten) and the future coaching great Paul Thompson, won a silver medal.

For the 1987 World Rowing Championships in Copenhagen Cox's New South Wales rival Dale Caterson was the incumbent rudder-man for the Australian men's senior eight, and Cox was selected in the stern of the Australian men's lightweight eight which also had good prospects. The regatta was held in bad weather and tricky winds made lane allocations and racing conditions difficult and the Australian eight did not fare well, missing the A final and finishing in overall eight place.

== Rugby coach ==
Cox's interest in coaching rugby union saw him eventually become a club coach between 2005 and 2011 in the Shute Shield, the premier club rugby union football competition in New South Wales. He started in 1998 as the second grade coach at Sydney's Northern Suburbs Rugby Club. His first head coaching experience came in 2003 with a two-year stint as head coach of the New South Wales Country Cockatoos an amateur representative side of regional players picked by the New South Wales Country Rugby Union.

At the end of 2005 he was appointed head coach of the Warringah Rugby Club and he guided that team for two seasons. For the 2009 season he was the backline coach at the Northern Suburbs Rugby Club. In 2011 he was appointed as first-grade coach of the West Harbour RFC where he served for one season.

== Professional and personal ==
Cox had a thirty-year career as an advertising copywriter and worked at a number of Sydney's leading ad agencies. At 50 years of age he completed his teaching qualifications and in 2014 secured a role at his alma-mater The King's School as an English teacher. He coached rugby and the school's first VIII up till 2019. Subsequently Cox had teaching roles at Knox Grammar School, then Frensham School.

Cox is married to Keeley Devery a prominent Australian representative netball player. Devery had a ten-year representative career from 1985 to 1995. She was awarded an OAM in 1992 and named in Netball Australia's Hall of Fame in 2010.
