= Rebecca Joyce =

Australian rower (born 1970)

Personal information
- Nationality: Australian
- Born: 12 September 1970 (age 55)
- Education: Geelong Grammar School

Sport
- Sport: Rowing
- Club: Mercantile Rowing Club; Melbourne University Boat Club; UTS Haberfield Rowing Club
Medal record
Women's rowing
Representing Australia
Olympic Games
Bronze medal – third place	1996 Atlanta	Lightweight double sculls
World Rowing Championships
Gold medal – first place	1995 Tampere	LW1x
Silver medal – second place	1990 Tasmania	LW4-

Rebecca Susan Joyce (born 12 September 1970 in Melbourne) is an Australian former rower, a sculler in the lightweight division. She was a five-time national champion, a 1995 world champion and Olympic medal winner.

== Club and state rowing ==
Joyce was educated at Geelong Grammar School where she took up rowing. She joined Mercantile Rowing Club in the final year of school and rowed from that club between 1988 and 1990. Joyce rowed at the Melbourne University Boat Club from 1991 to 1994. She relocated to Sydney in 1994 to be coached by Ellen Randall and rowed at the UTS Haberfield Rowing Club from 1994 to 2000.

Joyce was first selected for Victorian state representation in the 1989 women's youth four, however the Interstate Regatta was not conducted that year due to a cyclone. In 1990 she was an emergency reserve for the Victorian lightweight four. She finally competed at the 1991 Interstate Regatta within the Australian Rowing Championships as stroke of the Victorian women's lightweight four contesting and winning the Victoria Cup. From 1995 she represented New South Wales and rowed in their lightweight fours contesting the Victoria Cup at the Interstate Regatta in 1995, 1996, 1997 and 1999. Those New South Wales crews were victorious in 1995 and 1996.

She contested national titles at the Australian Rowing Championships on the number of occasions. In Melbourne University colours she contested the lightweight coxless pair in 1990 and won the lightweight coxless four title in 1991. In 1996 she won the national lightweight single sculls championship.

== International representative rowing ==
Joyce's national representative debut came when, still aged eighteen, she was selected to stroke the Australian lightweight four at the 1989 World Rowing Championships in Bled. They rowed to a fourth placing. Joyce and Sally Ninham held their seats in the Australian lightweight four in 1990 and were joined by Pam Westerndorf and Amanda Cross. They gained some international experience with a valuable tour of North America before coming back to Tasmania for the 1990 World Rowing Championships in Lake Barrington. In the final, Joyce stroked the Australian four to a silver medal.

In 1991 Joyce was the only returning member of that 1990 four and joined up with Tamsin Angus-Leppan, and Joyce's Victorian teammates Deirdre Fraser and Minnie Cade to compete at the 1991 World Rowing Championships. The lightweight four place fifth and Joyce and Cade doubled-up to row in the Australian women's heavyweight eight who placed twelfth.

Joyce suffered chronic fatigue in 1992 and took a break from the sport. In 1993, the lightweight double scull was announced for introduction into the Olympic program and this spurred her back into rowing, a move into sculls and a relocation to Sydney in order to be coached by Ellen Randall. Joyce was selected as Australia's lightweight single-sculls entrant for the 1995 World Rowing Championships in Tampere, Finland. She won her heat, finished second to France in the semi-final and then raced magnificently in the final to win the gold medal and a world championship title.

Joyce brought her Olympic dream to a reality when she was selected with the highly experienced Sydney lightweight Virginia Lee to row Australia's lightweight double scull at the 1996 Atlanta Olympics They won their heat and semi-final and raced with skill in the final to a bronze medal beaten out the fourth placed Italians by 0.27 seconds.

Post Olympics Joyce was back competing at the highest level in 1998. She rowed in a lightweight double scull at the World Rowing Cup II in Hazewinkel and then in the quad at WRC III in Lucerne. At the 1998 World Rowing Championships in Cologne, Joyce stroked Australia's lightweight quad scull. The Australians finished second in their heat and second in the repechage to make the final where they placed fifth. It was Joyce's last representative appearance.
