= Drew Ginn =

Australian rower (born 1974)

Drew Ginn OAM
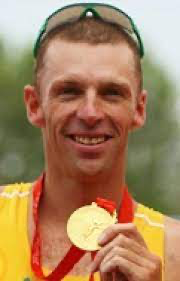

Personal information
- Born: 20 November 1974 (age 51)

Sport
- Sport: Rowing
- Club: Mercantile Rowing Club
Medal record
Men's rowing
Representing Australia
Olympic Games
Gold medal – first place	1996 Atlanta	Coxless four
Gold medal – first place	2004 Athens	Coxless pair
Gold medal – first place	2008 Beijing	Coxless pair
Silver medal – second place	2012 London	Coxless four
World Championships
Gold medal – first place	1998 Cologne	Coxed four
Gold medal – first place	1999 St. Catharines	Coxless pair
Gold medal – first place	2003 Milano	Coxless pair
Gold medal – first place	2006 Eton	Coxless pair
Gold medal – first place	2007 Munich	Coxless pair
Silver medal – second place	1998 Cologne	Coxless pair
Bronze medal – third place	1997 Aiguebelette	Eight
Bronze medal – third place	2011 Bled	Coxless four

Drew Cameron Ginn OAM (born 20 November 1974) is an Australian five-time world champion rower, a four time Olympian and triple Olympic gold medallist. From 1995 to 1998 he was a member of Australia's prominent world class crew – the coxless four known as the Oarsome Foursome.

== Club and state rowing ==
Ginn was educated at Scotch College, Melbourne where he took up rowing. His senior club rowing was done from the Mercantile Rowing Club in Melbourne.

His first state selection for Victoria came in the 1993 youth eight contesting the Noel Wilkinson Trophy in the Interstate Regatta at the Australian Rowing Championships. He rowed again in the Victorian youth eight in 1994, this time to victory in the Interstate Regatta. On twelve occasions between 1995 and 2008 he was selected in the Victorian senior men's eight to contest the King's Cup at the Interstate Regatta. Eight of those Victorian eights saw King's Cup victories and Ginn stroked three King's Cup eights, two to victory.

== National representative rowing ==
Ginn made his Australian representative debut in the 1994 U23 Trans Tasman series against New Zealand. He rowed in the Australian eight which won two of the three match races in the series. In 1994 he also contested the World Rowing U23 Championships in Paris rowing in the men's eight. In 1995 he first contested senior World Rowing Championships rowing in the men's eight to an eleventh placing in Tampere, Finland.

Ginn won gold in the men's coxless four at the Atlanta 1996 Summer Olympics as part of Australia's Oarsome Foursome, along with Mike McKay, James Tomkins, and Nicholas Green – Ginn replaced the retired Andrew Cooper. In 1997 he secured a seat in the Australian men's senior eight. He raced at the World Rowing Cup I in Lucerne that year and then at the 1997 World Rowing Championships in Aiguebelette, France he rowed in the seven seat for their third placing in the final and to a bronze medal. Ginn's 1997 season in the Australian eight also included a campaign at the Henley Royal Regatta where as an Australian Institute of Sport crew they contested and won the 1997 Grand Challenge Cup.

At the 1998 World Championships, back in the Oarsome Foursome Ginn raced and won the men's coxed four world title with Brett Hayman in the stern. Mike McKay and Ginn also took a silver medal at that same regatta as a coxless pair. In 1999, the foursome would go on to try out, but lose the 1999 Australian selection trials in a coxless four. Tomkins and Ginn decided to switch to a coxless pair and won the 1999 World Championship in St Catharines Canada.

Ginn and James Tomkins had planned to race the straight pair at the Sydney 2000 Summer Olympics, but Ginn suffered a severe back injury, forcing him to withdraw from the boat. In 2002, he returned to the water, teaming up with fellow Oarsome Foursome rower James Tomkins in a coxless pair; they finished fourth in the 2002 World Championships. In 2003, Ginn and Tomkins were the surprise winners, beating the British favourites—and defending champions—Matthew Pinsent and James Cracknell, which was a factor in Pinsent and Cracknell choosing to move to the coxless fours. At the 2004 Summer Olympics, Ginn and Tomkins won the gold medal in the coxless pairs.

In 2006, Ginn made a return to international competition at the 2006 World Rowing Championships held at Dorney Lake, Eton. He and new pairs partner Duncan Free were able to win despite choppy tail conditions. In 2007 Ginn and Free successfully defended their coxless pairs title, posting a time of 6:24.87 minutes — almost 6 secs ahead of their New Zealand rivals (Nathan Twaddle and George Bridgewater) who had stuck with them for the first 1000 m before dropping behind to take the silver.

Early in 2008 Drew Ginn and his 2007 World Champion partner Free, were pre-selected to compete for Australia at the 2008 Beijing Olympic Games where they won the gold medal as a coxless pair. At the 2012 London Olympics, Ginn won a silver medal in the Australian men's coxless four, behind the all-conquering Great Britain men's four, who went on to win gold in their fourth consecutive Olympics.

== Cycling career ==
In 2009 Ginn took up competitive road bicycle racing, with immediate success, particularly in the discipline of the time trial. He won the 2009 Oceania time trial championships. However, in downplaying the achievement, Ginn noted two riders in the under-23 competition actually posted faster times over the same course on the same day.

In a much stronger field at the 2010 Australian national road championships, Ginn finished sixth.

== Accolades ==
Ginn was awarded the Medal of the Order of Australia (OAM) in the 1997 Australia Day Honours and the Australian Sports Medal in June 2000.

Scotch College, Melbourne, Ginn's former school, named a racing eight "Drew Ginn" in his honour. The school's first VIII won the APS Head of the River (Australia) in that boat in 1998.

In 2003 together with James Tomkins he was named with FISA male rower of the year. In 2004 he was appointed as an Athletes Commission member to the Australian Olympic Committee. In 2007 jointly with Duncan Free he was named FISA male rower of the year.

In 2010, Ginn was inducted as a member of the Rowing Victoria Hall of Fame.

In 2014, the International Rowing Federation awarded Ginn the Thomas Keller Medal for his outstanding international rowing career. It is the sport's highest honour and is awarded within five years of the athlete's retirement, acknowledging an exceptional rowing career and exemplary sportsmanship.

In October 2018, he was inducted into the Sport Australia Hall of Fame.

== Rowing palmarès ==
=== Olympics ===
- 1996 Atlanta Olympics M4- bow – gold
- 2004 Athens Olympics M2- bow – gold
- 2008 Beijing Olympics M2- bow – gold
- 2012 London Olympics M4- three seat – silver

=== World Championships ===
- 1994 Trans Tasman Under 23 Series Men's eight
- 1994 World Rowing U23 Championships Men's eight
- 1995 World Rowing Championships Men's eight bow – eleventh
- 1997 World Rowing Championships Men's eight seven seat – bronze
- 1998 World Rowing Championships Coxed four three seat – gold
- 1998 World Rowing Championships Coxless pair stroke – silver
- 1999 World Rowing Championships Coxless pair bow – gold
- 2002 World Rowing Championships Coxless pair – bow – fourth
- 2003 World Rowing Championships Coxless pair bow – gold
- 2006 World Rowing Championships Coxless pair bow – gold
- 2007 World Rowing Championships Coxless pair bow – gold

=== National Interstate Regatta ===
- 1993 – Interstate Men's Youth Eight Championship five seat – Second
- 1994 – Interstate Men's Youth Eight Championship six seat – First
- 1995 – Interstate Men's Eight Championship three seat – First
- 1996 – Interstate Men's Eight Championship five seat – First
- 1997 – Interstate Men's Eight Championship six seat – Third
- 1998 – Interstate Men's Eight Championship six seat – First
- 1999 – Interstate Men's Eight Championship six seat – Second
- 2000 – Interstate Men's Eight Championship – First
- 2002 – Interstate Men's Eight Championship seven seat – First
- 2003 – Interstate Men's Eight Championship seven seat – First
- 2004 – Interstate Men's Eight Championship seven seat – Second
- 2006 – Interstate Men's Eight Championship stroke – First
- 2007 – Interstate Men's Eight Championship stroke – First
- 2008 – Interstate Men's Eight Championship stroke – Second

Awards and achievements
Preceded by Eskild Ebbesen	Thomas Keller Medal; 2014	Succeeded by Iztok Čop
