= Brett Hayman =

Australian rowing cox

Personal information
- Born: 3 May 1972 (age 54) Melbourne, Australia
- Years active: 1991-2003

Sport
- Sport: Rowing
- Club: Yarra Yarra Rowing Club; Mercantile Rowing Club
Medal record
Men's rowing
Representing Australia
Olympic Games
Silver medal – second place	2000 Sydney	Eight
World Championships
Gold medal – first place	1997 Aiguebelette	LM8+
Gold medal – first place	1998 Cologne	M4+
Gold medal – first place	1998 Cologne	M2+
Commonwealth Championships
Gold medal – first place	1994 Ontario	Coxed four

Brett Hayman (born 3 May 1972 in Melbourne) is an Australian three time world champion, a dual Olympian and an Australian national champion rowing coxswain. He won a silver medal at the 2000 Sydney Olympics steering the Australian men's eight. He coxed Australian crews at every premier world rowing regatta from 1993 to 2000.

== Club and state rowing ==
Hayman's senior coxing was initially from the Yarra Yarra Rowing Club in Melbourne and then the Mercantile Rowing Club. Later when he took an AIS scholarship he rowed from the Daramalan Rowing Club in Canberra.

Hayman's first Victorian state representative call-up was to the 1991 Victorian youth eight which contested the Noel Wilkinson Trophy at the Interstate Regatta within the Australian Rowing Championships. In 1995 he coxed the Victorian senior men's eight in the King's Cup at the Interstate Regatta. From 1997 when Hayman was at the Australian Institute of Sport he coxed ACT eights in the King's Cup, starting with the victorious ACT crew of 1997. He then steered the ACT King's Cup eights of 1998, 2000, 2001 and 2003.

== International representative rowing ==
Hayman's first Australian representative appearance was in the men's coxed four at the 1993 World Rowing Championships in Roudnice. That crew placed fifth as did Hayman's next representative boat, the coxed four who raced at the 1994 World Championships in Indianapolis. He was then in the stern of the Australian men's senior eight for Tampere 1995. He was the incumbent senior Australian coxswain coming into the 1996 Olympic year and steered the men's senior eight at Atlanta 1996 to a sixth-place finish.

World Championship success came to Hayman in 1997 as cox of the men's lightweight eight at the 1997 World Championships in Aiguebelette. The Australians won a thrilling final by 0.03 seconds and only 1.5 lengths separated the field.

In 1998 Australia's prominent world class crew the Oarsome Foursome returned to elite rowing from the break that followed their 1996 Olympic success. At the 1998 Cologne World Championships they rowed in a number of combinations including coxed crews steered by Hayman. They won gold as a coxed four and Nick Green, James Tomkins and Hayman were also crowned World Champions in a coxed pair.

At the 1999 World Rowing Championships Hayman was Australia's senior coxswain and he steered the men's eight (which placed seventh) and the pair to fourth place.

In the 2000 Olympic year Hayman was again in the Australian eight. He steered the crew in both World Rowing Cup races in Europe in their lead up campaign as well as at the Henley Royal Regatta where they raced as an Australian Institute of Sport eight and won that year's Grand Challenge Cup. Hayman's final Australian representative appearance was in the eight at the 2000 Sydney Olympics. The Australian eight won their heat beating the eventual gold medallists Great Britain in a time faster than the final. In the final Australians started slowly requiring an almighty sprint home which they almost achieved. They won the silver Olympic medal with Hayman in the stern.
