= Mercantile Rowing Club =

- Location: Boathouse Drive, Melbourne, Australia
- Home water: Yarra River, Melbourne
- Founded: 19 September 1880
- Affiliations: Rowing Victoria
- Website: www.mercantile.org.au

The Mercantile Rowing Club is based in Melbourne, Australia on the Yarra River. It was founded in 1880 and has occupied its current site since 1885. More than 40 Mercantillians have represented Australia at Olympic Games.

== Club history ==
A group of sportsmen interested in the advancement of amateur rowing met at Young and Jackson's Hotel on 19 September 1880 and the Mercantile Rowing club was born. William S Boyd was a driving influence and the club's first Captain. The club was initially named The Junior Warehouseman's Rowing Club and then changed its name in 1881. Boats and facilities were borrowed from the Greenlands boatshed next to the Prices Bridge until 1884 when the member's decided to lease land and build their own boatshed at the club's current location.

The current boathouse was built in 1973, after a fire destroyed the previous shed on 6 May 1973.

== Competition history & representative success ==
From Moscow 1980 the Mercantile club has had at least one representative in every Australian Olympic rowing squad without exception. At the 1987 Australian Rowing Championships, the Victorian Kings Cup winning VIII was crewed entirely by the Mercantile 1st grade VIII.

== Club presidents ==
- W. K. Thompson 1880–89
- J. B. Whitty 1889–1903
- A. R. Blackwood 1903–1905
- Sir Stephen Morell 1905–1933, a Lord Mayor of Melbourne.
- A. L. Dobbie 1933–1955
- J. G. H. Sprigg 1955–1982
- Robert R. Aitken M.B.E 1982–1993, coach of the Olympic bronze medallist VIII Melbourne 1956.
- David Boykett 1993–1997, an Olympic bronze medallist Melbourne 1956.
- Andrew Guerin 1997–2004, rowing historian and Olympic rowing team manager at Barcelona 1992 & Atlanta 1996.
- P. Batters 2004–2010
- Malcolm Batten since 2010, a 1986 World Champion and 1988 Olympian.

== Members ==
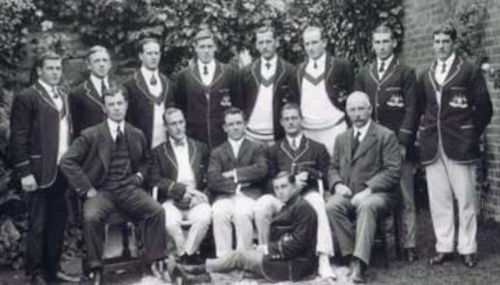
1912 Aust Olympic VIII CS Cunningham selector/mgr seated right

Membership of the club was male-only until 19xx, when the Club decided that it would allow women to become members.

Notable past members include:

- William S Boyd, founder and inaugural captain 1880–1889
- CS Cunningham, captain 1889–92 and an Olympic selector who accompanied the Australian VIII to Stockholm 1912
- Noel Donaldson, coach of the Oarsome Foursome at the time of their 1990 and 1991 World Championships and 1992 Olympic victory.
- Brian Richardson, coach of the Australian men's VIII at Barcelona 1992 and head coach at Sydney 2000.

Olympic representative members include:

- David Boykett, Olympic bronze medallists Melbourne 1956 and a competitor at Tokyo 1964
- Garth Manton, Brian Doyle, Harold Hewitt Olympic bronze medallists Melbourne 1956.
- David Douglas Olympic silver medallist Mexico City 1968.
- Robert Lachal, Martin Tomanovits, Graeme McCall, Anthony Walker, Richard Garrard, Simon Newcomb, Peter Gillon who competed at Tokyo 1964.
- Andrew Withers who competed in the Australian men's VIII at Moscow 1980.
- Ion Popa was in the Australian VIII which won the bronze medal at Los Angeles 1984 and competed in the VIII at Seoul 1988.
- Samuel Patten was in the Australian VIII which won the bronze medal at Los Angeles 1984, competed in a pair with Malcolm Batten at Seoul 1988 and competed in Barcelona 1992
- Susan Lee won the first Australian women's rowing medal, a bronze in the Women's 4+ at Los Angeles 1984.
- Mark Doyle competed in the men's VIII at Seoul 1988.
- Four of the various members of Australia's Oarsome Foursome — Mike McKay, James Tomkins, Andrew Cooper and Drew Ginn who staged multiple successful Olympic campaigns in pairs, fours and eights.
- Ben Dodwell who competed at Barcelona 1992, Atlanta 1996 and Sydney 2000.
- Peter Murphy and David Colvin of the Australian men's VIII at Barcelona 1992.
- Brett Hayman coxed the men's VIII at Atlanta 1996.
- Rebecca Joyce bronze medallist at Atlanta 1996.
- Georgina Douglas competed in a single scull at Sydney 2000.
- Katie Foulkes coxed the women's VIII at Sydney 2000 and Athens 2004.
- Matthew Long bronze medallist at Sydney 2000.
- David Crawshay gold medallist at Beijing 2008 and a competitor at Athens 2004 and London 2012.
- Josh Dunkley-Smith silver medallist at London 2012 and competitor at Rio 2016.
- Sarah Tait silver medallist at London 2012.
- Pauline Frasca competitor at London 2012.
- Jennifer Cleary in the women's quad at Rio 2016.
- Four members of the Australian women's eight at Rio 2016 - Fiona Albert, Charlotte Sutherland, Sarah Banting and Jessica Morrison. (Morrison also competed at Tokyo 2021 in both the women's four and the pair).
- Amanda Bateman in the women's double scull at Tokyo 2021.
- Katrina Werry and James Rook in the women's eight and Angus Widdicombe in the men's eight at Tokyo 2021.

World champions include:

- Samuel Patten, Mike McKay, James Tomkins, Andrew Cooper and Drew Ginn who all won various World Championship titles as the Oarsome Foursome.
- Rebecca Joyce 1995 World Champion women's lightweight sculler.
- Brett Hayman 1997 World Champion coxing a lightweight VIII and dually in 1998 coxing a pair and a four.
- Pauline Frasca, Robyn Selby Smith, 2005 dual World Champions (VIII and IV) and Fleur Chew 2005 World Champion in the women's VIII.

== Honours ==
=== Henley Royal Regatta ===
Year	Races won
1988	Ladies' Challenge Plate
