= Matthew Long (rower) =

Australian rower

Personal information
- Born: 27 June 1975 (age 51)
- Education: Newington College
- Years active: 1990-2000

Sport
- Sport: Rowing
- Club: Sydney Rowing Club; Mercantile Rowing Club
Medal record
Men's rowing
Representing Australia
Olympic Games
Bronze medal – third place	2000 Sydney	Coxless pair
World Rowing U23 Championships
Silver medal – second place	1997 Milan	BM4-

Matthew Long (born 27 June 1975) is an Australian former Olympian rower. He was an Australian national champion, a representative at World Championships and won a bronze medal in the coxless pair at Sydney 2000

== Club and state rowing ==
Long attended Newington College and coached by Olympian and Old Newingtonian Michael Morgan. He rowed three times in Newington crews at the New South Wales GPS Head of the River, and twice won the 1st VIII event in 1991 and 1992.

Long's senior club rowing was initially from the Sydney Rowing Club and later after his relocation to Victoria, from the Mercantile Rowing Club in Melbourne.

Long was selected at stroke in the New South Wales state representative men's eight to contest the 1998.King's Cup at the Interstate Regatta within the Australian Rowing Championships. In 2002 he raced the King's Cup in the Victorian state eight and won that event.

== International representative rowing ==
Long made his Australian representative debut while still a schoolboy in the 1991 junior Trans-Tasman series of match races against New Zealand. The selected Australian crew was the Newington College first VIII. They won both their races on Queensland. In 1992 the Newington College first VIII, now stroked by Long was again selected to race the series in New Zealand. They beat both New Zealand crews who contested the event.

Long was selected in a coxless four which contested the 1997 World Rowing Cup III in Lucerne and then the 1997 World Rowing U23 Championships in Milan. That four raced to a second place and a silver medal in Milan.

In the 2000 Olympic year Long was in the Australian squad and in contention for seat in a sweep-oared boat. He travelled with the squad on their international season and was in the eight when they raced at the Henley Royal Regatta as an Australian Institute of Sport eight and won that year's Grand Challenge Cup. In 2000 the Australian gun coxless pair were James Tomkins and Drew Ginn who had moved down into the smaller boat after their success in the Oarsome Foursome. Tomkins and Ginn had won a 1999 World Championship and planned a run at the 2000 Summer Olympics. On the 2000 overseas tour they raced at the World Rowing Cup III in Vienna and then just before the start of their semi-final at the next World Cup in Lucerne, Ginn suffered a serious back injury. Long stepped into the boat at the starting line and the pair of Tomkins and Long won the semi and the final. With only a short preparation they were racing at Sydney 2000 two months later. Their third place and bronze medal in Sydney was regarded as a tremendous achievement.

Long rowed on after the Olympics and in 2001 was seated in the men's eight for the 2001 World Rowing Championships in Lucerne where that crew placed seventh overall.
