= Samuel Patten =

Australian rower

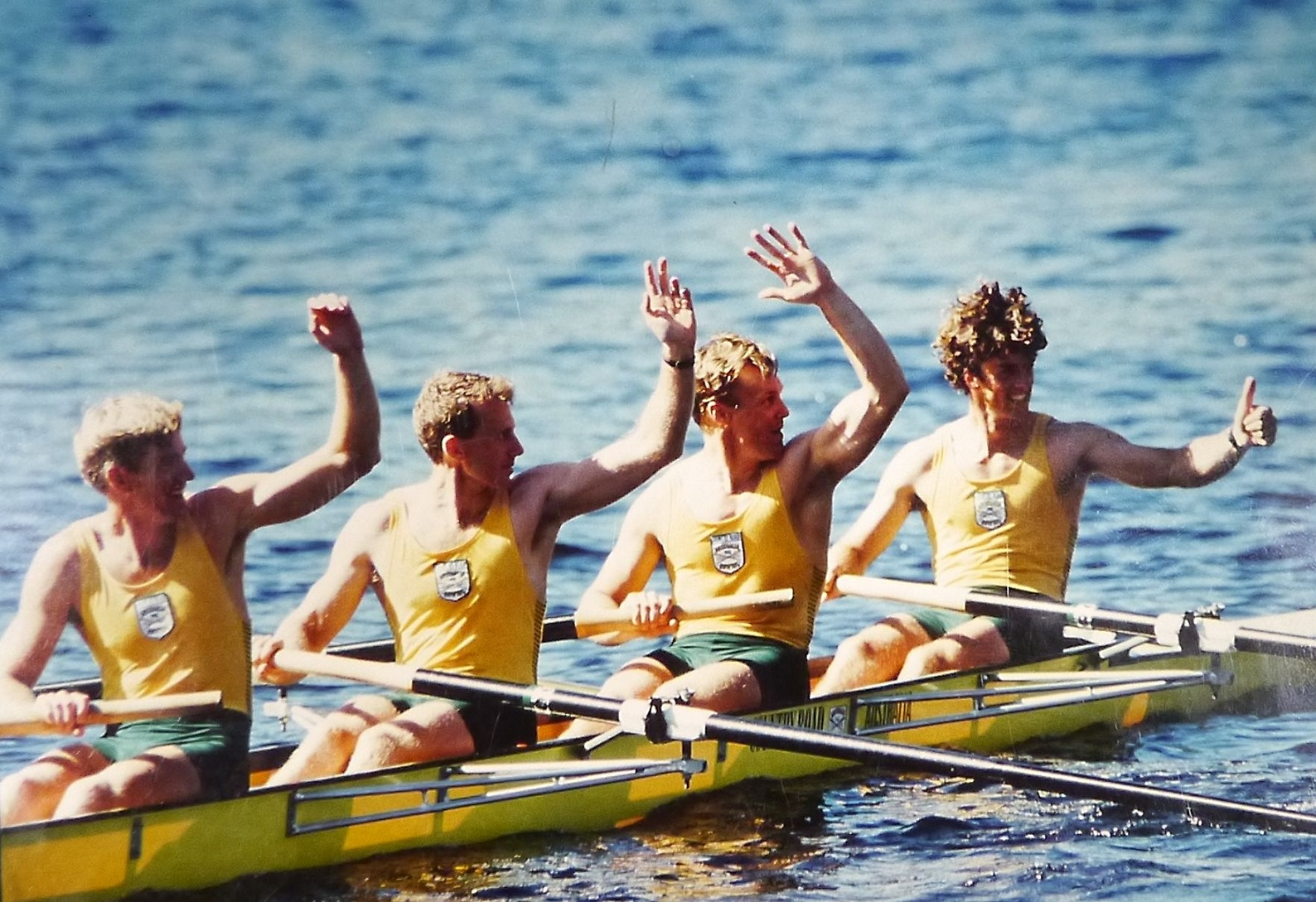
- Patten (at 3) in the 1990 Oarsome Foursome

Personal information
- Born: 23 May 1963 (age 63) Melbourne, Victoria
- Education: Scotch College, Melbourne; Monash University; Oxford University
- Occupation: Orthopaedic surgeon
- Height: 194 cm (6 ft 4 in)
- Weight: 90 kg (198 lb)
- Relative: Barry Patten (father)

Sport
- Club: Mercantile Rowing Club

Achievements and titles
- Olympic finals: 1992 Men's eight
Medal record
Men's rowing
Representing Australia
Olympic Games
| Bronze medal – third place | 1984 Los Angeles | Eight |
World Rowing Championships
| Gold medal – first place | 1990 Tasmania | Coxless four |
| Bronze medal – third place | 1983 Duisburg | M8+ |
- Updated on 22 August 2016

Samuel Patten (born 23 May 1963) is a former Australian World Champion rower and Olympic medallist. His professional career has been as an orthopaedic surgeon specialising in hip and knee surgery and based in Melbourne. From 1990 to 1991 he was a member of Australia's prominent world class crew – the coxless four known as the Oarsome Foursome.

== Club and state rowing career ==
The son of Olympic alpine skier and noted architect, Barry Patten, Samuel Patten took up rowing at Scotch College, Melbourne. His senior club rowing was with the Mercantile Rowing Club in Melbourne.

Patten was selected in Victorian state representative King's Cup crews contesting the men's Interstate Eight-Oared Championship at the Australian Rowing Championships in 1983, 1984, 1987, 1988, 1989 and 1990. He saw victories in 1987–88 and 1989–90. He was selected in the 1992 King's Cup eight but withdrew due to injury.

== International representative rowing ==
=== World Championships ===
Patten's first Australian selection was in the coxed four who placed fourth at the 1981 World Junior Championships. Two years later he was a member of the Australian men's senior eight who won a bronze medal at the 1983 World Rowing Championships in Duisburg, Germany.

Patten won a World Championship in first incarnation of Australia's Oarsome Foursome coxless four at the 1990 World Rowing Championships in Lake Barrington, Tasmania. He was seated at three, with Nick Green (bow), Mike McKay (two) and James Tomkins (stroke), and achieved his first and only world championship gold medal.

=== Olympics ===
Patten first Australian Olympic representative selection was the men's eight who took the bronze medal at Los Angeles 1984 Olympics.

At the Olympic games in Seoul 1988 Patten and Malcolm Batten were selected in the squad as reserves for the eight and qualified a coxless pair. They raced in heats and were eliminated in the repechage. Patten's last Australian representative selection was in the men's eight at the 1992 Barcelona Olympic Games. That crew placed fifth.

== Selector/administrator ==
From 1993 to 1996 Patten was a selector for Victorian states crews. In those same years he was on the Australian Olympic Committee's Athletes Commission.

From 1996 to 1997 he was a board member of Rowing Australia.

== Surgical career ==
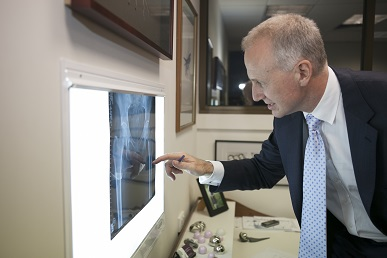
Samuel Patten in his private practice.

Graduating from Monash University with a degree in medicine, Patten gained a Fellowship from the Royal Australian College of Surgeons in 2002 and went on to work as a Senior Joint Replacement Fellow at the prestigious Nuffield Orthopaedic Centre in Oxford, England, and Consultant Trauma Surgeon at the John Radcliffe Hospital in Oxford and Oxford University in 2004. Patten specialises in injuries and arthritis of the hip and knee: Anterior Minimally Invasive Surgery (AMIS) for total hip replacement, conventional total hip replacement, revision hip replacement, total knee replacement, revision knee replacement, knee arthroscopy, reconstructive surgery of the knee (ACL), knee osteotomy, post-trauma reconstruction of the pelvis and lower limb.
