= Malcolm Batten =

Australian rower (born 1964)

Personal information
- Full name: Malcolm William Batten
- Born: 12 March 1964 (age 62) Launceston, Tasmania, Australia
- Years active: 1979–1991

Sport
- Sport: Rowing
- Club: North Esk RC; Commercial Rowing Club; Mercantile Rowing Club; RMIT Rowing Club
Medal record
Men's rowing
Representing Australia
World Championships
Gold medal – first place	1986 Nottingham	Eight
Commonwealth Games
Gold medal – first place	1986 Edinburgh	Eight

Malcolm William Batten (born 12 March 1964) is an Australian rower. He is a former state and national champion, World Champion, Olympian and Commonwealth Games gold medal-winner.

== Club and state rowing ==
Batten was born in Tasmania and commenced his rowing career in 1979 as a coxswain with the North Esk Rowing Club in Launceston. He rowed for a season in 1982 with the Tweed Heads Rowing Club prior to moving to Brisbane and joining the Commercial Rowing Club.

He was one of the first Australian Institute of Sport scholarship holders in 1985 and held full AIS scholarships from 1985 to 1988. He moved to Melbourne in 1988 and joined the Mercantile Rowing Club. In 1988 he was one of the founders of the RMIT Rowing Club.

Wearing club colours but racing in AIS combinations Batten competed for national titles at the Australian Rowing Championships in pairs and fours from 1986. He won the Australian national title in AIS coxless four in 1987 and 1988. He stroked AIS eights to victory in Queensland state championships in 1988, 1989 and 1990 with that 1988 crew also winning the New South Wales state championship that year.

Batten competed twice at the Australian Rowing Championships in the men's Interstate Eight-Oared Championship – the King's Cup. He stroked the Queensland King's Cup eight in 1988 and he raced in the victorious Victorian crew of 1990.

== International representative rowing ==
Batten's first national representative selection was to the 1985 Match des Seniors in Banyoles, Spain – the equivalent at the time of today's World Rowing U23 Championships. Batten stroked the Australian men's eight to a silver medal. That same crew represented Australia in the men's eight selected for the 1985 Trans-Tasman U/23 regatta held on Lake Ruataniwha in New Zealand.

Batten's first senior representative selection was to 1986 World Rowing Championships in Nottingham, England. He rowed in the two seat of the victorious Australian men's eight. It was Australia's first and only World Championship title in the men's eight. That same year at the 1986 Commonwealth Games in Edinburgh, in that same crew Batten won gold in the Australian men's VIII.

At the 1987 World Rowing Championships in Copenhagen Batten was again in the two seat of Australian eight. That crew placed fourth.

For the 1988 Summer Olympics in Seoul, Batten was beaten out for his seat in the Australian men's eight by South Australian rower Hamish McLachlan. Batten and Sam Patten were selected in the squad as reserves for the eight and qualified a coxless pair. They raced in heats at the Seoul Olympics but were eliminated in the repechage.

His final national representative racing was as the stroke of the men's eight for the 1991 World Rowing Championships in Vienna. They finished tenth.

== After rowing ==
Following competitive retirement Batten coached at St Catherine's School, Toorak from 1992 to 1994. Since 2011 he has been the president of Mercantile Rowing Club.

He is a partner and managing director of the Melbourne headquartered international construction business Cockram Construction. Since 2017 that company has been part owned by the Japanese international firm Kajima.
