= Liz Moller =

Australian rower

Sport
- Sport: Rowing
- Club: Canberra Rowing Club

Achievements and titles
- National finals: ULVA Trophy 1998-99
Medal record
Women's rowing
Representing Australia
World Rowing Championships
Gold medal – first place	1992 Montreal	Lwt coxless four

Elizabeth Moller is an Australian former World Champion lightweight rower.

== Club and state rowing ==
Moller rowed from Canberra in the Australian Capital Territory (ACT) for the Canberra Rowing Club. She first raced at the Australian Rowing Championships in 1990 in an under-19 pair and then in 1991 in an under-23 pair.

Moller was selected to represent the ACT at the Interstate Regatta within the Australian Rowing Championships on the rare occasions in the 1990s when the ACT boated representative crews – in 1998 in an open women's four and 1999 in the open women's eight.

== National representative rowing ==
Moller was first selected to represent Australia and saw immediate success at the 1992 World Rowing Championships in Montreal, Canada, when she won the world championship in the lightweight four, with Virginia Lee, Marina Cade, and Deirdre Fraser. That same crew were selected for Račice 1993 to attempt to defend their title – they placed fourth.
