= Virginia Lee (rower) =

Australian rower (born 1965)

Personal information
- Born: 6 April 1965 (age 61) Sydney, Australia
- Height: 173 cm (5 ft 8 in)
- Weight: 59 kg (130 lb)

Sport
- Sport: Rowing
Medal record
Women's rowing
Representing Australia
Olympic Games
| Bronze medal – third place | 1996 Atlanta | Lwt W2X |
World Rowing Championships
| Gold medal – first place | 1992 Montreal | Lwt W4- |
| Bronze medal – third place | 1999 St. Catharines | Lwt W2X |
Commonwealth Games
| Silver medal – second place | 1986 Edinburgh | Lwt W4- |
| Silver medal – second place | 1994 Ontario | Lwt W2X |

Virginia Lee (born 6 April 1965) is an Australian former rower. She was a four-time national champion, a 1992 world champion, a dual Olympian and an Olympic bronze medallist who competed in both sweep oared and sculling events in the lightweight division.

== Club and state rowing ==
Lee was born in Sydney, Australia. Her senior rowing was from the Mosman Rowing Club in Sydney.

On eight occasions from 1986 to 1996 she represented New South Wales, racing for the Women's Lightweight Four Championship (the Victoria Cup) at the Australian Rowing Championships. Her crews won the championship in 1995 and 1996. They crossed the line first in 1988 but were disqualified for a doping infringement.

In 1995 and again in 2000 Lee won the Australian national lightweight single sculls title.

== National representative rowing ==
=== World championships ===
She was selected to national representative honours for the 1986 and 1987 World Rowing Championships in the women's lightweight four who came fourth both times. At the 1992 World Rowing Championships in Montreal, Canada, she won a world championship in the lightweight four, with Marina Cade, Deirdre Fraser, and Liz Moller.

At the next world championships in Račice 1993, her Australian lightweight four finished in fourth place. The following year at Indianapolis 1994, she raced in a lightweight double scull which finished seventh. At the 1995 World Rowing Championships in Tampere, Finland, Lee was again part of the lightweight four, but the boat did not start. At those same championships she also competed in the lightweight women's double scull with Joanne Morgan and where they placed fourth. At the 1999 World Rowing Championships in St. Catharines, Ontario, Canada, she partnered with Sally Newmarch in the lightweight double scull to win a bronze medal.

=== Olympics ===
At the 1996 Summer Olympics in Atlanta, USA, she partnered with Rebecca Joyce and won bronze in the lightweight women's double sculls. At the 2000 Summer Olympics in her home city of Sydney, she again competed with Newmarch in a lightweight double scull and they came fourth.
