= Noel Donaldson =

Australian rowing coxswain and coach

Personal information
- Born: 16 December 1955 (age 70)

Sport
- Country: Australia
- Sport: Rowing
- Club: Mercantile Rowing Club

Achievements and titles
- National finals: King's Cup 1979

Noel Donaldson (born 16 December 1955) is an Australian former rowing coxswain and has since 1990 been a prominent and successful world-class rowing coach of Victorian state, Australian national and later, New Zealand national crews.

== Rowing career ==
Donaldson's senior rowing was from the Mercantile Rowing Club. In 1979 he was selected to cox the Victorian men's eight who contested and won the King's Cup at the Interstate Regatta within the Australian Rowing Championships.

Donaldson made his sole Australian representative appearance as coxswain of the 1979 Australian men's eight who contested the 1979 World Rowing Championships in Bled. That crew finished in fourth place.

== Coaching career ==
Donaldson started coaching at Melbourne's Carey Baptist Grammar School where James Tomkins stroked the first VIII in both his senior years, 1982 and 1983. Donaldson was instrumental in Tomkins early development and brought him to Mercantile Rowing Club. Donaldson successful coaching career was then forged on the consistent performances he extracted from the Tomkins and the rest of the Oarsome Foursome, Australia's prominent world class crew of the 1990s and early 2000s. Donaldson was consistently the top Victorian men's coach of the 1990s, coaching ten Victorian men's King's Cup eights in that decade to eight victories, one silver and one bronze. In that period he also coached two Victorian women's fours to victory and twice took Georgina Douglas to victory as the Australian single sculling champion at the Interstate Regatta.

In the 1990s he coached the Oarsome Foursome to five World Championship campaigns, winning four gold medals and one silver in fours and pairs combinations. He twice took Georgina Douglas to World Championships in 1998 and 1999. For the World Championships of 2001, 2002 and 2003 he was the Head Men's Coach of the Australian squads. In 2009, 2010 and 2011 he was the coach of the Australian men's eight in their World Championship campaigns.

Donaldson took Australian crews to five Olympic games including gold medal victories by the Oarsome Foursome at Barcelona 1992 and Atlanta 1996. He was the Australian head men's coach for 2004 Athens where the Australians finished as the most successful men's team at the Olympic Regatta.

From 2001 to 2003 Donaldson was Head Coach at the Victorian Institute of Sport. From 2004 to 2008 he was the High Performance Director of Rowing Australia. From 2008 to 2012 he was the Head Men's Coach at the Australian National Rowing Centre of Excellence. In 2010 he was inducted into the Victorian Rowing Hall of Fame.

In 2013 he took a role as head coach of the New Zealand men's sweep crews in the World Championship campaign and that year coached the coxless pair of Hamish Bond and Eric Murray who were at that point in the middle of their six years of world dominance as a coxless pair.

== Coaching palmares ==
=== Australian interstate regatta ===
- 1990 Interstate men's eight (Kings's Cup) co-coach Victoria – First
- 1991 Interstate men's eight (King's Cup) coach Victoria – First
- 1992 Interstate men's eight (King's Cup) coach Victoria – First
- 1994 Interstate men's eight (King's Cup) coach Victoria – First
- 1995 Interstate men's eight (King's Cup) coach Victoria – First
- 1996 Interstate men's eight (King's Cup) coach Victoria – First
- 1997 Interstate men's eight (King's Cup) coach Victoria – Third
- 1998 Interstate men's eight (King's Cup) coach Victoria – First
- 1999 Interstate men's eight (King's Cup) coach Victoria – Second
- 2000 Interstate men's eight (King's Cup) coach Victoria – First
- 1995 Interstate women's four coach Victoria – First
- 1998 Interstate women's four co-coach Victoria – First
- 1998 Interstate women's single scull coach Victoria – First
- 1999 Interstate women's single scull coach Victoria – Second
- 2000 Interstate women's single scull coach Victoria – First
- 2004 Interstate men's youth eight co-coach Victoria – Second

=== World Championships ===
- 1990 World Championships men's coxless four - Gold
- 1991 World Championships men's coxless four - Gold
- 1993 World Championships men's eight - 4th
- 1995 World Championships men's coxless four - 5th
- 1998 World Championships men's coxed pair - Gold
- 1998 World Championships men's coxless pair - Silver
- 1998 World Championships men's coxed four - Gold
- 1998 World Championships women's scull - 8th
- 1999 World Championships men's coxless pair - Gold
- 1999 World Championships women's scull - 8th
- 1999 World Championships men's coxed pair - 4th
- 2001 World Championships head men's coach (Australia)
- 2002 World Championships head men's coach (Australia)
- 2003 World Championships head men's coach (Australia)
- 2009 World Championships men's eight coach – 7th
- 2010 World Championships men's eight coach – Bronze
- 2010 World Championships men's coxed pair coach - Gold
- 2011 World Championships men's eight coach – 4th
- 2011 World Championships men's coxed pair coach – Silver
- 2013 World Championships lead men's sweep coach (New Zealand)
- 2013 World Championships NZ men's pair coach - Gold

=== Olympics ===
- 1992 Barcelona Olympics men's coxless four coach – Gold
- 1996 Atlanta Olympics men's coxless four coach – Gold
- 2000 Sydney Olympics men's coxless pair coach – Bronze
- 2000 Sydney Olympics women's single scull coach – 5th
- 2004 Athens Olympics Australian head men's coach
- 2012 London Olympics men's eight co-coach – 6th

=== U23 World Championships ===
- 1994 Nations Cup men's eight coach – 4th
- 1997 Nations Cup men's eight coach – 4th
- 2003 U23 World Championships men's single scull co-coach – Gold
- 2003 U23 World Championships men's l'weight single scull co-coach – Silver

- 1994 U23 Trans Tasman series – Australian men's eight coach
