= James Tomkins (rower) =

Australian rower (born 1965)

James Tomkins OAM
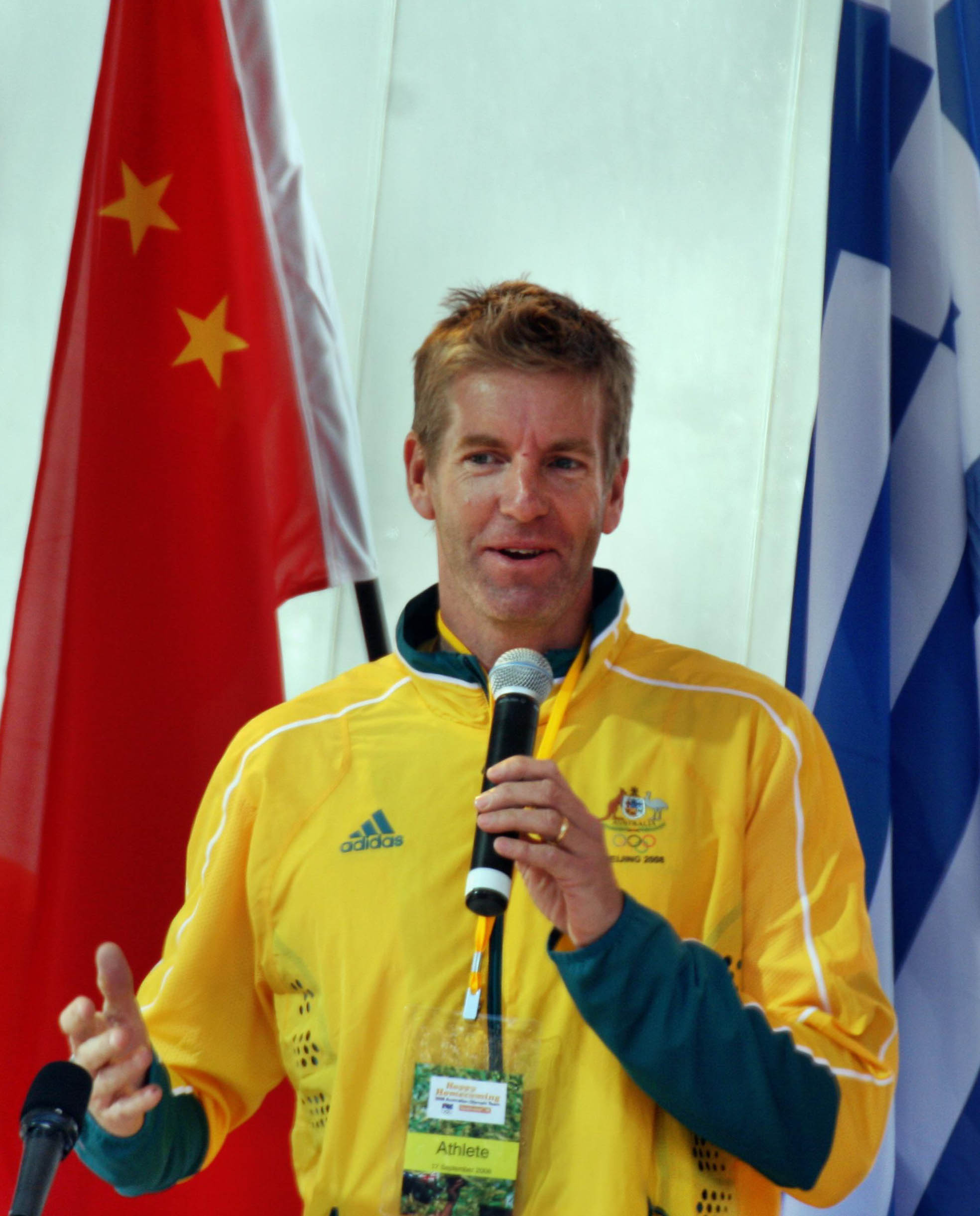
- Tomkins in 2008

Personal information
- Born: 19 August 1965 (age 61) Sydney, New South Wales
- Education: Carey Baptist Grammar School
- Occupation: Financial Services
- Height: 200 cm (6 ft 7 in)
- Weight: 98 kg (15 st 6 lb; 216 lb)

Sport
- Club: Mercantile Rowing Club
- Coached by: Noel Donaldson
Medal record
Men's rowing
Representing Australia
Olympic Games
Gold medal – first place	1992 Barcelona	Coxless four
Gold medal – first place	1996 Atlanta	Coxless four
Gold medal – first place	2004 Athens	Coxless pair
Bronze medal – third place	2000 Sydney	Coxless pair
World Championships
Gold medal – first place	1986 Nottingham	Eight
Gold medal – first place	1990 Tasmania	Coxless four
Gold medal – first place	1991 Vienna	Coxless four
Gold medal – first place	1998 Cologne	Coxed four
Gold medal – first place	1998 Cologne	Coxed pair
Gold medal – first place	1999 St. Catharines	Coxless pair
Gold medal – first place	2003 Milan	Coxless pair
Commonwealth Games
Gold medal – first place	1986 Edinburgh	Eight
Bronze medal – third place	1986 Edinburgh	Coxed four
- Updated on 7 December 2016

James Bruce Tomkins (born 19 August 1965) is an Australian rower, seven-time World Champion and a three-time Olympic gold medalist. He is Australia's most awarded oarsman, having made appearances at six Olympic games (for three gold and one bronze medal); eleven World Championships (for seven world titles including one in each of the five sweep oar events); four Rowing World Cups (for two titles) and eighteen state representative King's Cup appearances – the Australian blue riband men's VIII event, (for fifteen victories, ten as stroke). Tomkins is one of only five Australian athletes and four rowers worldwide to compete at six Olympics. From 1990 to 1998 he was the stroke of Australia's prominent world class crew – the coxless four known as the Oarsome Foursome.

== Club and state rowing ==
Tomkins took up rowing at Carey Baptist Grammar School. He stroked the Carey First VIII in both of his senior years, 1982 and 1983. His long senior club career was with the Mercantile Rowing Club in Melbourne.

Tomkins was selected in Victorian state representative King's Cup crews contesting the men's Interstate Eight-Oared Championship at the Australian Rowing Championships on eighteen occasions from 1985 to 2004. Tomkins was in winning Victorian King's Cup crews on fifteen occasions, for ten of which he was in stroke seat.

Tomkins competed in Mercantile colours in the National Regatta at the Australian Rowing Championships in coxless pairs and in coxed and coxless fours from 1985. He won Australian national titles at those Australian Rowing Championships in 1985, 1987 and 1988 in a 2-; in 1986 and 1987 in a 4+; and in 1988 and 1990 in a 4- with other members of the Oarsome Foursome.

== International representative rowing ==
In 1985, Tomkins first made the Australian national team as stroke of the senior men's eight for the 1985 World Rowing Championships in Hazewinkel Belgium. The Australian eight finished in ninth place. In 1986, the Australian eight stroked by Steve Evans won a gold medal at the 1986 World Rowing Championships in Nottingham, England with Tomkins rowing in the six seat. That same crew rowed to victory at the 1986 Commonwealth Games in Edinburgh, and Tomkins won a Commonwealth Games gold medal. Tomkins also stroked a coxed four to a bronze medal at those same games.

At the World Championships in Copenhagen 1987 Tomkins was in the six seat when the men's VIII finished in fourth place and at the 1988 Summer Olympics, the Australian eight finished fourth with Tomkins again rowing at six.

In 1990 with his Mercantile clubmates Samuel Patten and Mike McKay and Nick Green from the Melbourne University Boat Club, Tomkins began racing an Australian representative coxless four. Their success was immediate. They won the 1990 and 1991 World Championships. After Andrew Cooper replaced Samuel Patten, they followed up with a gold medal at the 1992 Summer Olympics in Barcelona. The crew's success gained them the nickname Oarsome Foursome and lifted the profile of rowing in Australia. The crew repeated its gold medal performance at the 1996 Summer Olympics, this time with Drew Ginn replacing Andrew Cooper.

At the 1998 World Championships, the Oarsome Foursome raced and won the men's coxed four world title with Brett Hayman in the stern. Tomkins, Green and Hayman also took the world title at that same regatta as a coxed pair. In 1999, the boat would go on to try out, but lose the 1999 Australian selection trials in a coxless four. Tomkins and Drew Ginn decided to switch to a coxless pair and won the 1999 World Championship. This win established Tomkins as the first man to win a gold medal at World Championships in each of the five sweep rowing events.

Tomkins and Ginn had planned to row the pair at the 2000 Summer Olympics in Sydney, but while in Europe preparing for the games, a severe back injury requiring surgery sidelined Ginn. On short notice, Tomkins teamed with team alternate Matthew Long, (who had to switch from stroke side to bow side) and they raced a surprising third at the Lucerne World Cup race. Tomkins and Long were selected to represent Australia, and at the Olympics, they finished third behind France and the United States, just 1.3 seconds out of first place.

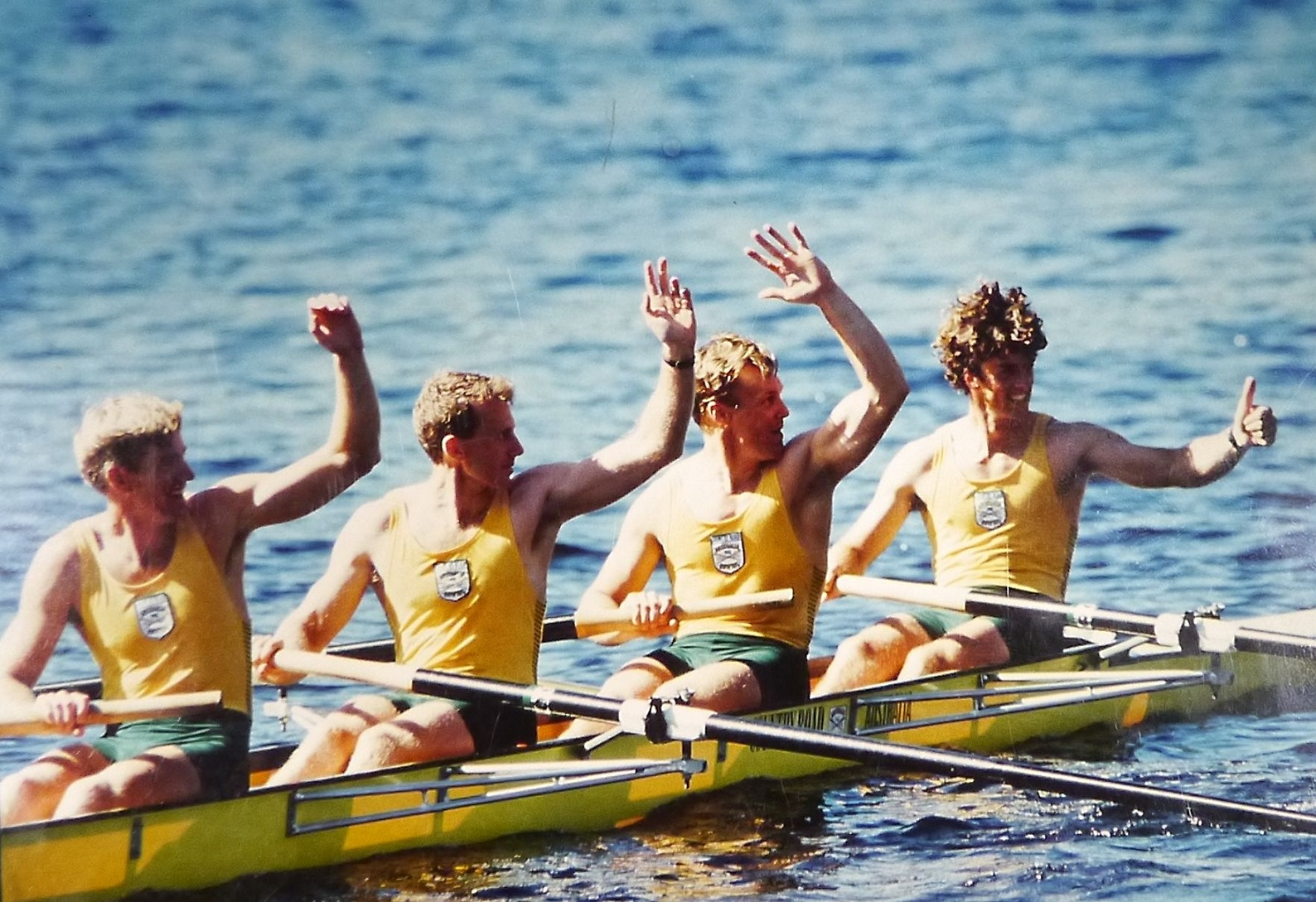
Tomkins (stroke): 1990 Australian M4-.

Returning to a coxless pair in 2002, Ginn and Tomkins beat the heavily favoured British crew of Matthew Pinsent and James Cracknell in a world cup race before finishing a close fourth at the 2002 World Championships. In 2003, Ginn and Tomkins reversed the prior years result winning the 2003 World Championship, with Pinsent and Cracknell placing fourth. In 2004, Pinsent and Cracknell moved to the coxless four to better their chances for a medal. Ginn and Tomkins would go on to win the coxless pair at the 2004 Summer Olympics, leading at every mark, beating Croatia by 2 seconds, with South Africa claiming the bronze.

Tomkins was selected in the men's eight for the 2007 World Rowing Championships in Munich, placing a disappointing 4th. He competed in his sixth Olympic Games at Beijing following the disqualification of the Russian Federation boat as a result of a doping scandal. Tomkins was the Australian flag bearer at the Opening Ceremony. Tomkins and his crew finished last in the final of the men's eight and 6th overall at the Beijing Games.

He is one of four athletes to compete in rowing at six Olympics, along with Romanian Elisabeta Oleniuc Lipă in 2004, Canadian cox Lesley Thompson, and Estonian Jüri Jaanson.

== Accolades ==
James Tomkins was announced as the 2008 Victorian Father of the Year by the Father's Day Council of Victoria Inc.

In 2010 he was inducted as a member of the Rowing Victoria Hall of Fame and that same year the International Rowing Federation awarded Tomkins the Thomas Keller Medal for his outstanding international rowing career. It is the sport's highest honour and is awarded within five years of the athlete's retirement, acknowledging an exceptional career and exemplary sportsmanship.

In 2012 he was inducted into the Sport Australia Hall of Fame and was elected to the IOC Athletes' Commission. He will serve as an IOC member for eight years.

Tomkins also helped to build the Carey/Yarra Yarra Boat Sheds on the Yarra River in Melbourne. There is an eight named after him in Carey boatshed.

== Achievements ==
- 2008 Beijing Olympics Australian Flag Bearer
- Olympic Medals: 3 Gold, 1 Bronze
- World Championship Medals: 7 Gold
- Commonwealth Games Medals: 1 Gold, 1 Bronze
- King's Cup: 15 Championships
- FISA World Cups: 2 Gold
- FISA Crew of the Year: 2003, Coxless Pair
- Thomas Keller Medal: 2010

=== Olympic Games ===
- 1988 – 5th, Eight
- 1992 – Gold, Coxless Four (with Nick Green, Andrew Cooper, Mike McKay)
- 1996 – Gold, Coxless Four (with Nick Green, Drew Ginn, Mike McKay)
- 2000 – Bronze, Coxless Pair (with Matthew Long)
- 2004 – Gold, Coxless Pair (with Drew Ginn)
- 2008 – 6th, Eight

=== World championships ===
- 1985 – 9th, Eight
- 1986 – Gold, Eight
- 1987 – 4th, Eight
- 1990 – Gold, Coxless Four (with Nick Green, Samuel Patten, Mike McKay)
- 1991 – Gold, Coxless Four (with Nick Green, Samuel Patten, Mike McKay)
- 1995 – 5th, Coxless Four (with Nick Green, Drew Ginn, Mike McKay)
- 1998 – Gold, Coxed Pair (with Nick Green and Brett Hayman
- 1998 – Gold, Coxed Four (with Nick Green, Mike McKay, Drew Ginn and Brett Hayman
- 1999 – Gold, Coxless Pair (with Drew Ginn)
- 2002 – 4th, Coxless Pair (with Drew Ginn)
- 2003 – Gold, Coxless Pair (with Drew Ginn)
- 2007 – 7th, Eight

=== FISA World Cups ===
- 2002 – 1st, Coxless Pair, World Cup II
- 2007 – 10th, Eight, World Cup II
- 2007 – 6th, Eight, World Cup III
- 2008 – 1st, Eight, World Cup I
- 2008 – 4th, Eight, World Cup II

=== The Kings Cup ===
- 1984– 1st
- 1986– 1st
- 1987– 1st
- 1988– 1st
- 1990– 1st
- 1991– 1st
- 1992– 1st
- 1994– 1st
- 1995– 1st
- 1996– 1st
- 1998– 1st
- 1999– 2nd, Western Australia (1st)
- 2000– 1st
- 2002– 1st
- 2003– 1st
- 2004– 2nd, New South Wales (1st)
- 2007– 1st
- 2008– 2nd, New South Wales (1st)

=== Commonwealth Games ===
- 1986 – Gold, Eight. Bronze, Coxed Four (with James Galloway, Andrew Cooper, Mike McKay and Dale Caterson (cox)).

== See also ==
- List of athletes with the most appearances at Olympic Games
