= Oarsome Foursome =

Australian rowing team

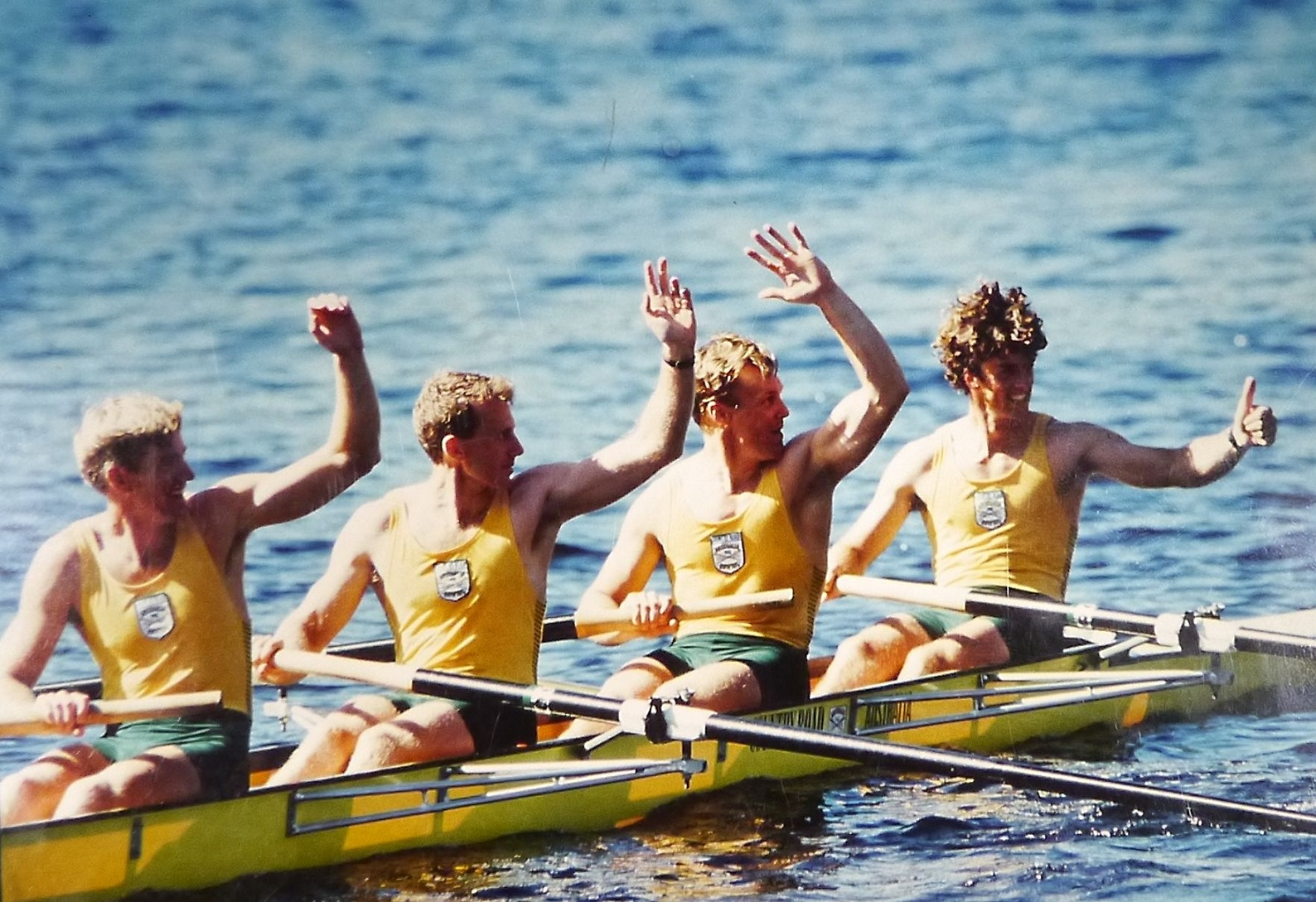
- The 1990 Oarsome Foursome
Medal record
Men's rowing
Representing Australia
Olympic Games
Gold medal – first place	1996 Atlanta	Coxless four
Gold medal – first place	1992 Barcelona	Coxless four
Silver medal – second place	2012 London	Coxless four
World Championships
Gold medal – first place	1998 Cologne	Coxed four
Gold medal – first place	1998 Cologne	Coxed pair
Gold medal – first place	1991 Vienna	Coxless four
Gold medal – first place	1990 Lake Barrington	Coxless four
Silver medal – second place	1998 Cologne	Coxless pair

The Oarsome Foursome is the nickname for an Australian men's rowing coxless four crew who competed with a clear lineage between 1990 and 2012, winning two Olympic gold medals and one silver medal, two world championships as a coxless four, and additional world championship titles in coxed boats. Members of the Oarsome Foursome when split into pairs placed first and second in the 1998 World Rowing Championships and won gold at the 2008 Beijing Olympics.

== 1st combination ==
They first achieved success seated as Nick Green (bow), Mike McKay (two), Samuel Patten (three) and James Tomkins stroke, when they won gold at the 1990 World Rowing Championships in Lake Barrington. They were coached by Noel Donaldson a former Victorian and national representative coxswain who had taken to coaching after competitive retirement. Donaldson encouraged periods of relaxation within the crew's training regime and it's been reported that the rowers spent the morning of that final indulging in a relaxed round of golf.

== 2nd combination ==
Patten was replaced by Andrew Cooper in 1991, and another World Championship title was won in Vienna 1991. Around this time they were accused by former Norwegian coach Thor Nilsson of not being serious enough about their training. In lead-up races before the 1992 Olympics the crew's dominance was challenged by fours from the Netherlands and the USA but after a seat swap by Donaldson between Cooper and Green and the adoption of the new short "cleaver" blades they won gold at Barcelona 1992. The win led them to become household names, and they were crowned Moomba Monarchs (popularly called Kings of Moomba) in 1993, and appeared in television advertisements for the Australian canned fruit brand Goulburn Valley.

== 3rd combination ==
Andrew Cooper retired in 1995, and Drew Ginn took the bow seat. In that combination, they won a second Olympic gold medal at Atlanta 1996, cementing their popularity and fame and elevating the profile of rowing in Australia. Following a break in 1997, they returned to world-class rowing in 1998, winning gold at the 1998 Cologne World Championships as a coxed four steered by Brett Hayman. At those same championships, McKay and Ginn took silver as a coxless pair and Green; Tomkins and Hayman were also crowned World Champions in a coxed pair.

The Australian coxless four at Sydney 2000 contained no members of any previous Oarsome Foursome, although Tomkins won a bronze medal with Matthew Long in a coxless pair. Again at Athens 2004, the coxless four contained all-new faces, while Tomkins and Ginn took gold in a pair and Mike McKay rowed in the 8+. At Beijing in 2008, Tomkins rowed in the six-seat of the Australian 8+, while Ginn won gold in a coxless pair with Duncan Free.

In 2004, they released a DVD titled Oarsome Foursome Fitness, a general fitness training guide not necessarily aimed at rowers (although there is a section on perfecting your rowing stroke).

== 4th variation ==
At London 2012, Drew Ginn provided a single link to the previous Foursomes when he was selected in the two-seat of Australia's coxless four with James Chapman, Josh Dunkley-Smith and Will Lockwood. That combination won the Olympic silver medal.
