= Marina Cade =

Australian former World Champion rower

Personal information
- Nickname: Minnie
- Born: 15 March 1968 (age 58)
- Education: Melbourne University
- Occupation: Architect
- Years active: 1986–2000

Sport
- Sport: Rowing
- Club: MUBC
Medal record
Women's rowing
Representing Australia
World Rowing Championships
| Gold medal – first place | 1992 Montreal | LW4- |
| Silver medal – second place | 1988 Milan | LW4- |

Marina Cade (born 15 March 1968 in Melbourne) is an Australian former representative rower. A lightweight sweep oar rower and later a sculler, her senior rowing was with the Melbourne University Boat Club. She was a 1992 world champion.

== Club and state rowing ==
Cade took up rowing at school at Methodist Ladies' College, Melbourne and continued on at Melbourne University Boat Club where she commenced her studies in architecture in 1986. During this time she was a resident at Ormond College.

On eight occasions from 1987 to 1998 she represented Victoria, racing for the Interstate Women's Lightweight Four Championship (the Victoria Cup) at the Australian Rowing Championships. She crewed in boats which won that championship in 1987, 1991, 1992, 1993, 1997 and 1998. She stroked the 1993 crew. Late in her career she represented for Victoria in a quad scull at the Interstate Regatta at the 2000 Australian Rowing Championships.

== National representative rowing ==
When still only in her second year out of school, Cade was first selected to represent Australia, for the 1987 World Rowing Championships in Copenhagen to stroke the lightweight four. That crew placed fourth. The following year at Milano 1988 Cade was in the lightweight coxless four that took the silver medal. She stroked the Australian lightweight pair at the World Student Games in 1989. At the 1991 World Rowing Championships in Vienna, Cade was in the three seat of the lightweight coxless four as well as racing in the bow seat of Australia's open women's eight.

World Championship success came to Cade at the 1992 World Rowing Championships in Montreal, Canada, when she won the world championship in the lightweight four, with Virginia Lee, Deirdre Fraser, and Liz Moller. That same crew were selected for Račice 1993 to attempt to defend their title – they placed fourth.

Cade retired from competitive rowing in 2000. She has practised as an architect.
