= Deirdre Fraser =

Australian rower

Personal information
- Years active: 1986–1995

Sport
- Sport: Rowing
- Club: Bendigo Rowing Club; MUBC

Achievements and titles
- National finals: Victoria Cup 1991-95
Medal record
Women's rowing
Representing Australia
World Rowing Championships
Gold medal – first place	1992 Montreal	LW4-

Deirdre Fraser is an Australian former World Champion lightweight rower.

== Club and state rowing ==
Fraser took up rowing in 1986 at the Bendigo Rowing Club and rowed for that club until 1990. When she began to represent at state and national level from 1991 she raced for the Melbourne University Boat Club.

On four occasions from 1991 to 1995 she represented Victoria, racing for the Women's Lightweight Four Championship (the Victoria Cup) at the Australian Rowing Championships. Her crews won the championship in 1991, 1992 and 1993.

== National representative rowing ==
Fraser was first selected to represent Australia, for the 1991 World Rowing Championships in Vienna in the lightweight four. That crew placed fifth. The following year Fraser saw world championship success at the 1992 World Rowing Championships in Montreal, Canada, when she won the world championship in the lightweight four, with Virginia Lee, Marina Cade, and Liz Moller. That same crew were selected for Račice 1993 to attempt to defend their title – they placed fourth.

Fraser retired from competitive rowing in 1995. She was general manager of Rowing Victoria from 1995 to 1999.
