= Andrew Cooper (rower) =

Australian rower

Personal information
- Full name: Andrew Dollman Cooper
- Nickname: Coops
- Born: 23 December 1964 (age 61) Melbourne, Victoria, Australia
- Years active: 1985–1995

Sport
- Sport: Rowing
- Club: Mercantile Rowing Club
Medal record
Men's rowing
Representing Australia
Olympic Games
Gold medal – first place	1992 Barcelona	Coxless four
World Rowing Championships
Gold medal – first place	1986 Nottingham	Eight
Gold medal – first place	1991 Vienna	Coxless four
Commonwealth Games
Gold medal – first place	1986 Edinburgh	Eight

Andrew Dollman Cooper OAM (born 23 December 1964) is a former Australian Olympic Champion and World Champion rower. He is a national champion, dual Olympian and two-time World Champion who achieved success as a member of Australia's "Oarsome Foursome" in 1991 and 1992.

== Club and state rowing ==
Cooper's senior rowing was with the Mercantile Rowing Club in Melbourne and he was selected to train at the Australian Institute of Sport from 1986.

Cooper competed at the National Regatta in Mercantile colours in coxless pair and in coxed and coxless four from 1986 to 1988 and in 1990. He won Australian national titles at those Australian Rowing Championships in 1986 in a coxless four; and in 1990 in both the coxed and coxless four with other members of the Oarsome Foursome.

Cooper was selected in Victorian state representative King's Cup crews contesting the men's Interstate Eight-Oared Championship at the Australian Rowing Championships in 1988, 1991, 1992, 1994, 1995. Cooper enjoyed the rare distinction of being victorious in every King's Cup he raced.

== International representative rowing ==
Cooper's first national representative selection was to the 1985 Match des Seniors in Banyoles Spain – the equivalent at the time of today's World Rowing U23 Championships. Cooper rowed in the Australian men's eight to a silver medal. That same crew represented Australia in the men's eight selected for the 1985 Trans-Tasman U/23 regatta held on Lake Ruataniwha New Zealand.

Cooper's senior call-up was into the men's eight who competed and took the gold at the 1986 World Rowing Championships in Nottingham, England. This was Australia's first and to date only, World Championship win the men's eight. That same year at the 1986 Commonwealth Games in Edinburgh, in that same crew Cooper won gold in the Australian men's VIII.

At the 1987 World Rowing Championships in Copenhagen, Cooper was in the bow seat of the Australian eight who took fourth place. He was moved to the three seat for the men's eight for the 1988 Summer Olympics in Seoul who placed fifth. Cooper's teammates on that occasion were James Galloway, Hamish McLachlan, Mike McKay, Mark Doyle, James Tomkins, Ion Popa, Steve Evans, and Dale Caterson (cox). He would go on to enjoy great success rowing with Tomkins and McKay.

In 1991 Cooper was in the Australian coxless four who won gold at the 1991 World Rowing Championships in Vienna along with Nick Green, Mike McKay, and James Tomkins. This was the second iteration of Australia's successful Oarsome Foursome. The same crew repeated this achievement taking gold the following year at the Barcelona 1992 Olympics.

After a break the champion foursome returned to the water at state and national level in 1994 but were not ready for the 1994 World Championships. At the 1995 World Rowing Championships in Tampere Finland, the Oarsome Foursome represented again as a Coxless four seated as they'd been at Vienna and Barcelona. They finished fifth. This was Cooper's last international regatta in Australian colours.

== Accolades ==
In 1999 he was inducted into the Sport Australia Hall of Fame. In 2010 Cooper was inducted as a member of the Rowing Victoria Hall of Fame.
