= Mike McKay (rower) =

Australian rower (born 1964)

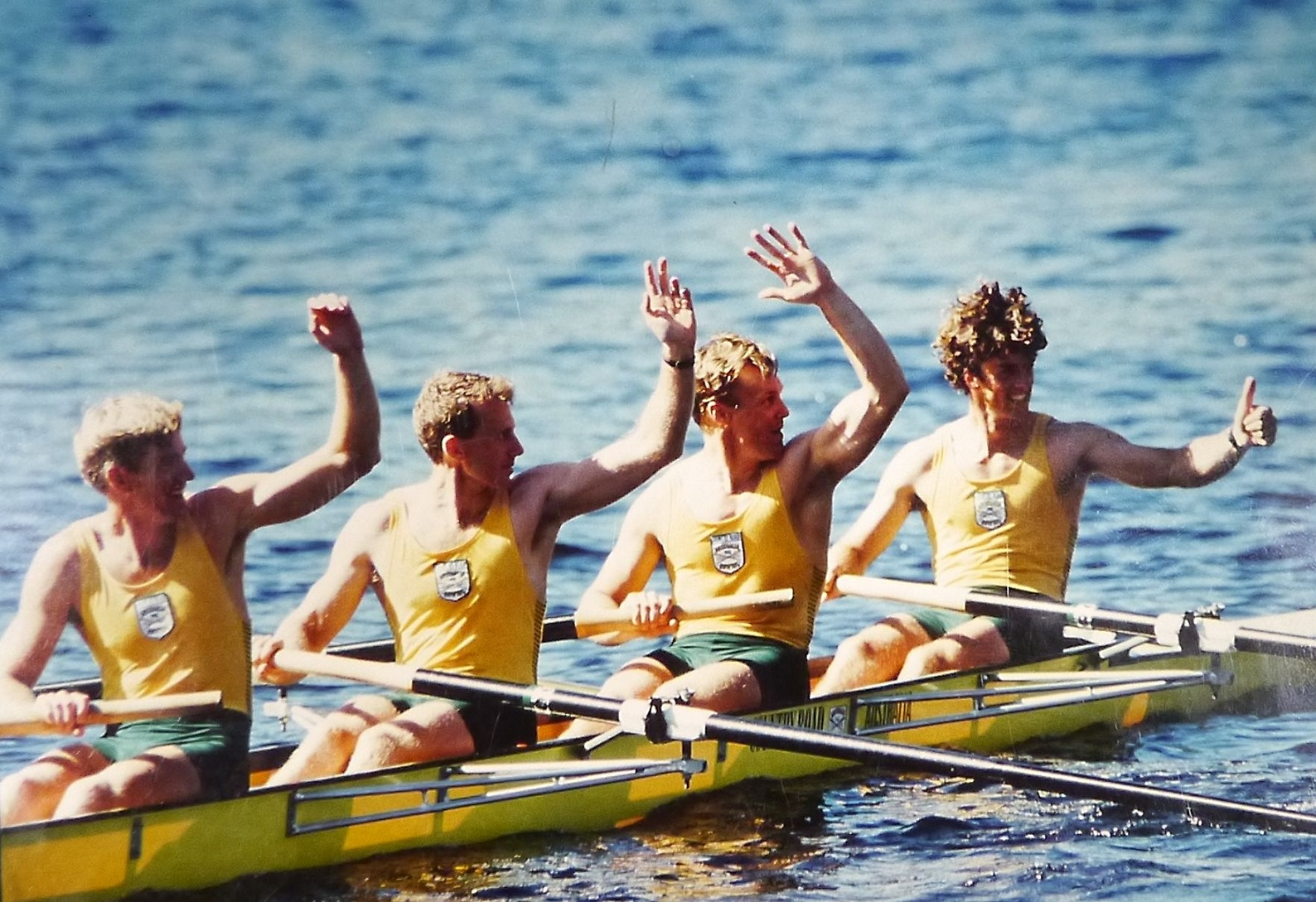
- McKay (at 2) in the 1990 Oarsome Foursome

Personal information
- Born: 30 September 1964 (age 61)
- Years active: 1990–2004

Sport
- Sport: Rowing
- Club: Mercantile Rowing Club
Medal record
Olympics
Gold medal – first place	1992 Barcelona	Coxless four
Gold medal – first place	1996 Atlanta	Coxless four
Silver medal – second place	2000 Sydney	Eight
Bronze medal – third place	2004 Athens	Eight
World Championships
Gold medal – first place	1986 Nottingham	Eight
Gold medal – first place	1990 Tasmania	Coxless four
Gold medal – first place	1991 Vienna	Coxless four
Gold medal – first place	1998 Cologne	Coxed four
Silver medal – second place	1998 Cologne	Coxless pair
Commonwealth Games
Gold medal – first place	1986 Edinburgh	Eight
Bronze medal – third place	1986 Edinburgh	Coxed four

Michael Scott McKay, OAM (born 30 September 1964), known as Mike McKay, is an Australian rower, a four-time world champion, a four-time Olympic medallist and Commonwealth Games gold medallist. From 1990 to 1998 he was a member of Australia's prominent world class crew – the coxless four known as the Oarsome Foursome.

== Club and state rowing ==
McKay commenced his rowing at Xavier College in Kew, Melbourne. His senior club rowing was from the Mercantile Rowing Club.

McKay was selected in Victorian state representative King's Cup crews contesting the men's Interstate Eight-Oared Championship at the Australian Rowing Championships on eighteen occasions from 1986 to 2004. McKay was in winning Victorian King's Cup crews on fifteen occasions.

== International representative rowing ==
McKay's first national representative selection was to the 1985 Match des Seniors in Banyoles Spain – then the equivalent of today's World Rowing U23 Championships. McKay rowed in the Australian men's eight to a silver medal. That same crew represented Australia in the men's eight selected for the 1985 Trans-Tasman U/23 regatta held on Lake Ruataniwha New Zealand.

His first senior national call up was to the 1986 World Rowing Championships in Nottingham, England where he rowed the four seat in the Australian men's eight to victory. It was Australia's first and only World Championship title in the men's VIII. That same year at the 1986 Commonwealth Games in Edinburgh, in that same crew McKay won gold in the Australian men's VIII. McKay also rowed in a coxed four to a bronze medal at those same games.

In 1990, McKay, with Nick Green, Samuel Patten, James Tomkins were selected race as Australia's coxless four. Their success was immediate. They won the 1990 and 1991 World Rowing Championships. And with Andrew Cooper replacing Samuel Patten, they followed up with a gold medal at the 1992 Summer Olympics in Barcelona. The crew's success gained them the nickname Oarsome Foursome.

The boat repeated its Gold medal performance at the 1996 Summer Olympics, this time with Drew Ginn replacing Andrew Cooper.

At the 1998 World Rowing Championships, McKay, with the other members of the Oarsome Foursome, teamed to win the coxless four. At those same championships McKay with Drew Ginn placed second in the coxless pair. In 1999 the foursome tried out but lost the 1999 Australian selection trials as a coxless four. Nick Green retired, Tomkins and Ginn decided to switch to the coxless pairs, and McKay tried out for the Australian eight which ended up finishing seventh at the World Championships.

In 2000 the Australian eight qualified for the Olympics and raced at two Rowing World Cups in the lead up campaign as well as at the Henley Royal Regatta where they raced as an Australian Institute of Sport eight and won that year's Grand Challenge Cup. At Sydney 2000 with McKay in the bow seat, the Australian eight won their heat in a pace that blew away the eventual gold medallists Great Britain. However, in the final they started slowly and their late sprint home left them 0.8 seconds behind the Brits at the line and to take the silver Olympic medal in a thrilling finish.

McKay was again in the Australian eight for the 2004 Summer Olympics in Athens. The boat finished third behind the United States and the Netherlands.

== Accolades ==
In 1993, McKay and the other members of his 1992 Olympic boat were awarded the Order of Australia.

In 2007 he was inducted into the Sport Australia Hall of Fame. and that same year the International Rowing Federation awarded McKay the Thomas Keller Medal for his outstanding international rowing career. It is the sport's highest honour and is awarded within five years of the athlete's retirement, acknowledging an exceptional career and exemplary sportsmanship.

== Rowing palmares ==
=== Olympic Games ===
- 2004 – Bronze, Eight
- 2000 – Silver, Eight
- 1996 – Gold, Coxless Four (with Nick Green, Drew Ginn, James Tomkins)
- 1992 – Gold, Coxless Four (with Nick Green, Andrew Cooper, James Tomkins)
- 1988 – 5th, Eight

=== World championships ===
- 1999 – Seventh, Eight
- 1998 – Gold, Coxed Four (with Nick Green, James Tomkins, Drew Ginn and Brett Hayman (cox))
- 1998 – Silver, Coxless Pair (with Drew Ginn)
- 1995 – 5th, Coxless Four (with Nick Green, Drew Ginn, James Tomkins)
- 1991 – Gold, Coxless Four (with Nick Green, Samuel Patten, James Tomkins)
- 1990 – Gold, Coxless Four (with Nick Green, Samuel Patten, James Tomkins)
- 1986 – Gold, Men's Eight

== Life after rowing ==
In May 2011 McKay was announced as the CEO of the GreenEdge Cycling Team which began competing in 2012. In 2022 he coached the Victorian men's senior eight to a second placing in the King's Cup at the Interstate Regatta.
