= Nick Green (rower) =

Australian rower (born 1967)

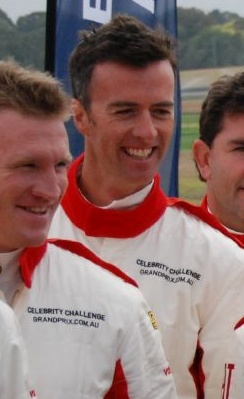
- Nick Green at the 2008 Australian Grand Prix Celebrity Challenge

Personal information
- Nationality: Australian
- Born: 4 October 1967 (age 59) Melbourne, Victoria, Australia
- Education: Xavier College
- Occupation: Former rower
Medal record
Men's rowing
Representing Australia
Olympic Games
Gold medal – first place	1992 Barcelona	Coxless four
Gold medal – first place	1996 Atlanta	Coxless four
World Championships
Gold medal – first place	1990 Tasmania	Coxless four
Gold medal – first place	1991 Vienna	Coxless four
Gold medal – first place	1998 Cologne	Coxed four
Gold medal – first place	1998 Cologne	Coxed pair
- Updated on 21 September 2014

Nicholas David Green OAM (born 4 October 1967) is an Australian former rower, a dual Olympic gold medallist and four time World Champion. From 1990 to 1998 he was a member of Australia's prominent world class crew – the coxless four known as the Oarsome Foursome. Now a sports administrator, since 2014 he has been Chief Executive of Cycling Australia.

== Rowing career ==
Educated at Xavier College in Kew, Melbourne and at Melbourne High School, Green competed in two Olympic Games — 1992 Summer Olympics and 1996 Summer Olympics, winning gold medals at each in the "Oarsome Foursome".

== Accolades ==
He was one of the eight flag-bearers of the Olympic Flag at the opening ceremony of the 2000 Sydney Olympics.

He was awarded the Medal of the Order of Australia in 1993 for services to rowing and the Australian Sports Medal in 2000. In 2010 Green was inducted as a member of the Rowing Victoria Hall of Fame.

== Sports administrator ==
In 2008 Nick was appointed as director of game and industry development for Golf Australia.

He was appointed the Chef de mission for the Australian team at the 2012 Olympic Games.

In September 2014 he was appointed as Chief Executive of Cycling Australia.

== Achievements ==
- Olympic Medals: 2 Gold
- World Championship Medals: 4 Gold

=== Olympic Games ===
- 1996 – Gold, Coxless Four (with James Tomkins, Drew Ginn, Mike McKay)
- 1992 – Gold, Coxless Four (with James Tomkins, Andrew Cooper, Mike McKay)

=== World Championships ===
- 1998 – Gold, Coxed Four (with James Tomkins, Mike Mckay, Drew Ginn and Brett Hayman (cox))
- 1998 – Gold, Coxed Pair (with James Tomkins and Brett Hayman (cox))
- 1995 – 5th, Coxless Four (with James Tomkins, Drew Ginn, Mike McKay)
- 1991 – Gold, Coxless Four (with James Tomkins, Andrew Cooper, Mike McKay)
- 1990 – Gold, Coxless Four (with James Tomkins, Sam Patten, Mike McKay)

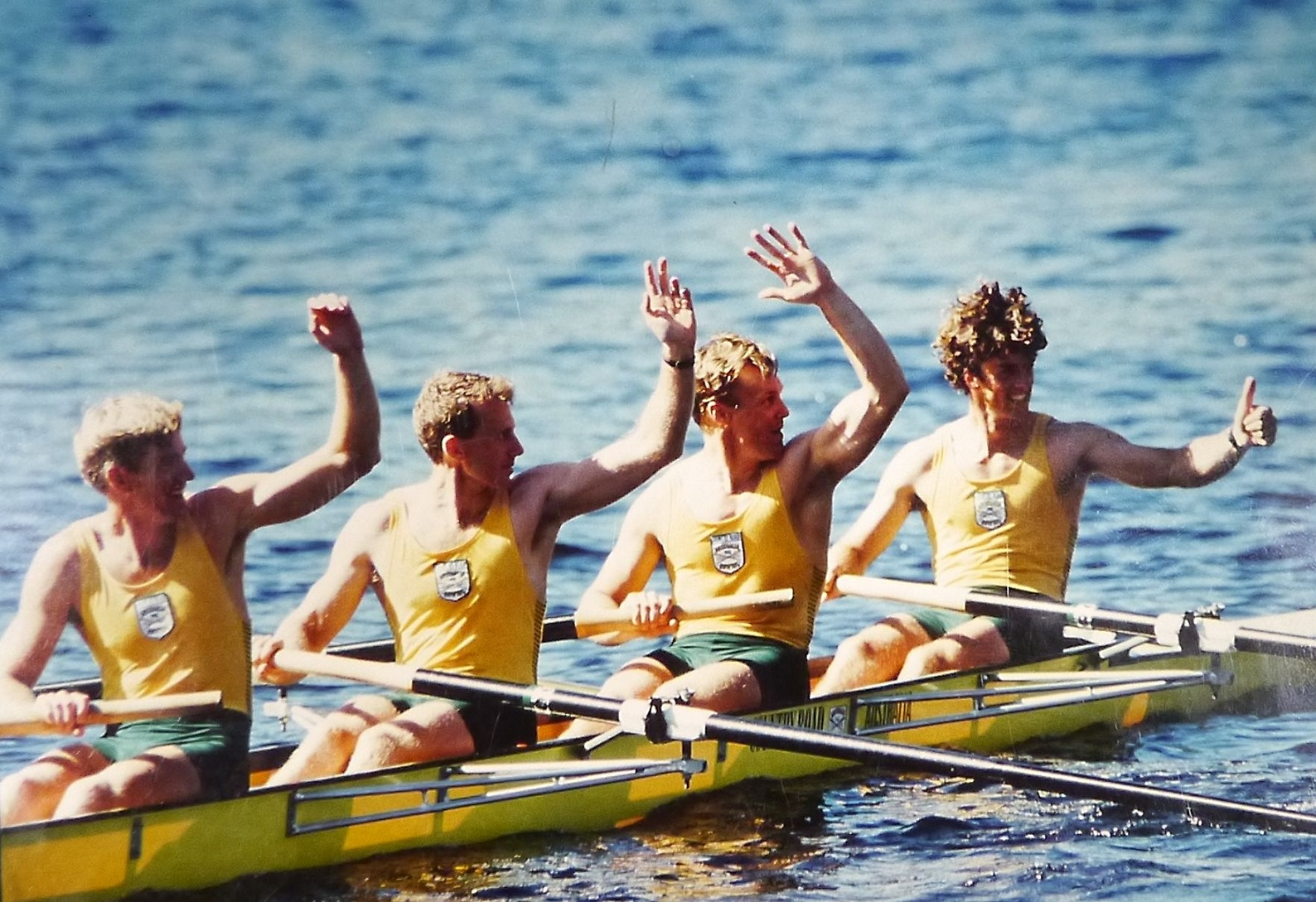
Nick Green (bow) in the 1990 foursome
