= Coxless pair =

Boat class used in competitive rowing

Coxless pair icon

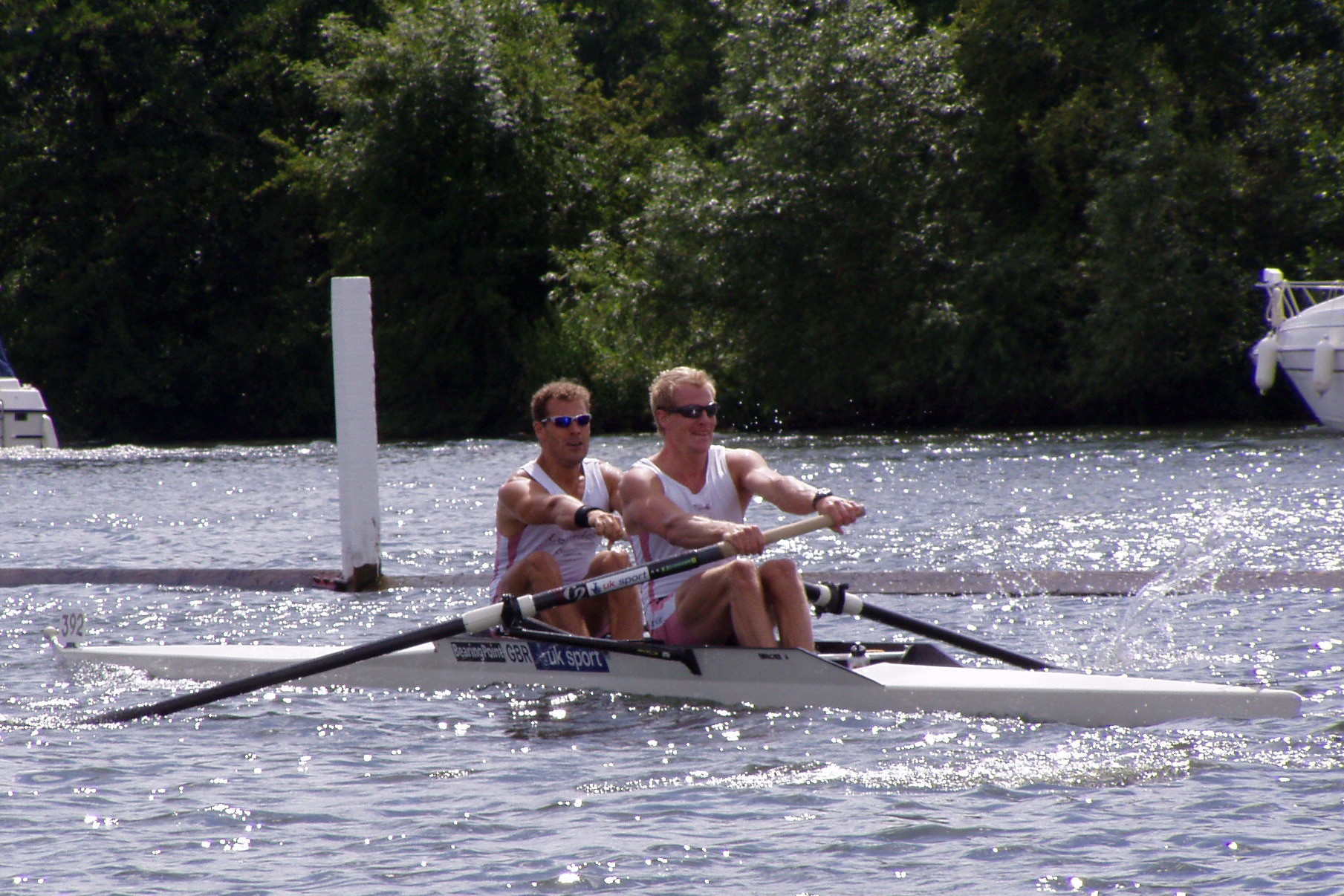
A coxless pair which is a sweep-oar boat. The rower on the left of the photo, or the bow of the boat. is rowing "starboard" or "bowside". The rower on the right of the photo and closest to the stern of the boat is rowing "port" or "strokeside".

A coxless pair, abbreviated as a 2- and also known as a straight pair, is a racing shell used in the sport of competitive rowing. It is designed for two rowers, who propel the boat with sweep oars.

The crew consists of a pair of rowers, each having one oar, one on the stroke side (rower's right hand side) and one on the bow side (rower's lefthand side). As the name suggests, there is no coxswain (cox) on such a boat, and the two rowers co-ordinate steering and the proper timing of oar strokes between themselves or by means of a steering installation which is operated by foot from one of the rowers. The equivalent boat when it is steered by a cox is referred to as a "coxed pair".

Racing boats (often called "shells") are long, narrow, and broadly semi-circular in cross-section in order to reduce drag to a minimum. Originally made from wood, shells are now almost always made from a composite material (usually carbon-fibre reinforced plastic) for strength and weight advantages. Pairs have a fin towards the rear, to help prevent roll and yaw. The riggers are staggered alternately along the boat so that the forces apply asymmetrically to each side of the boat.

A coxless pair is often considered the most difficult boat to row, as each rower must balance their side in cooperation with the other, apply equal power, place their catch and extract the blade simultaneously in order to move the boat efficiently. There are also difficulties with the hydrodynamics, such as having the pins offset longitudinally, which causes non-orthogonal paddle angles to exert a rotational torque on the shell (sometimes called "waddle"), which can make it exceedingly difficult for the coach to dial in the optimal shell configuration for rowers of distinct stature.

"Coxless pair" is one of the classes recognized by the International Rowing Federation and is competed in the Olympic Games.

== See also ==
- Rowing at the Summer Olympics
- World Rowing Championships
- Silver Goblets & Nickalls' Challenge Cup
