= Goldstream River (Vancouver Island) =

Watercourse in Capital Regional District, British Columbia, Canada

Coordinates: 48°29′00″N 123°33′00″W

The Goldstream River (Saanich: sʔə́ləq̕ʷtəɬ) is a river northwest of Victoria on southern Vancouver Island, British Columbia, Canada. The river's name derives from a small gold rush in its basin during the 1860s, and was originally Gold Stream.

== Course ==
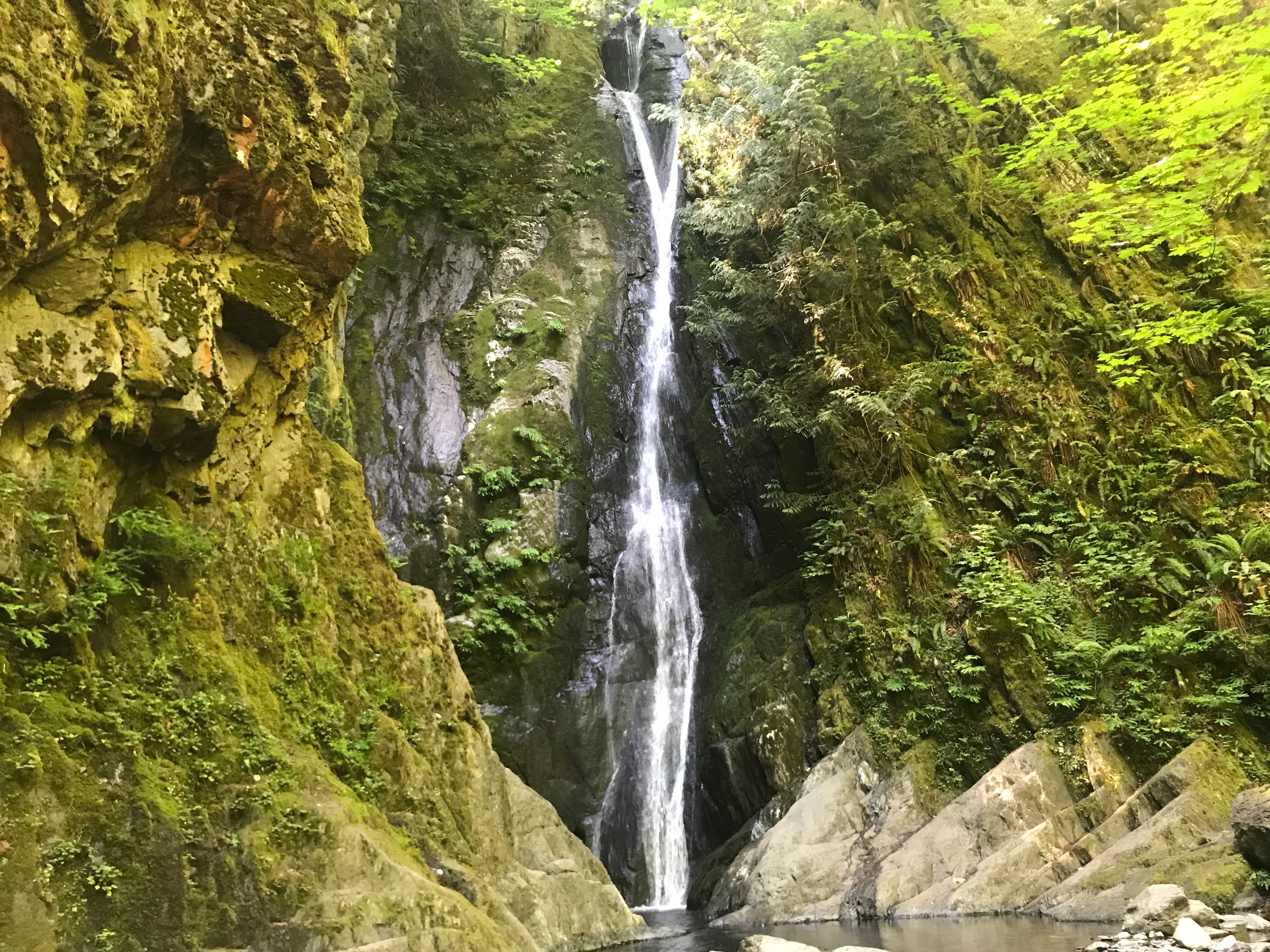
Niagara Falls

The Goldstream River begins at the outlet of Butchart Lake, the first of three reservoirs along the upper reaches of the Goldstream which are within the Greater Victoria Watershed Area. Shortly after exiting Butchart Lake it flows into Lubbe Lake. Shortly after exiting Lubbe Lake the river enters the final and largest of the three lakes, Goldstream Lake. After exiting Goldstream Lake, the river flows southeast until it turns north and enters Goldstream Provincial Park. Just before entering the park, the river receives its first major tributary, Waugh Creek. About halfway through the park, the river tumbles over Goldstream Falls. After the falls it continues north, receiving its final major tributary, Niagara Creek, just before finally entering the southern end of Finlayson Arm, a long inlet at the south end of the larger Saanich Inlet, while still inside the park.

== Power generation ==
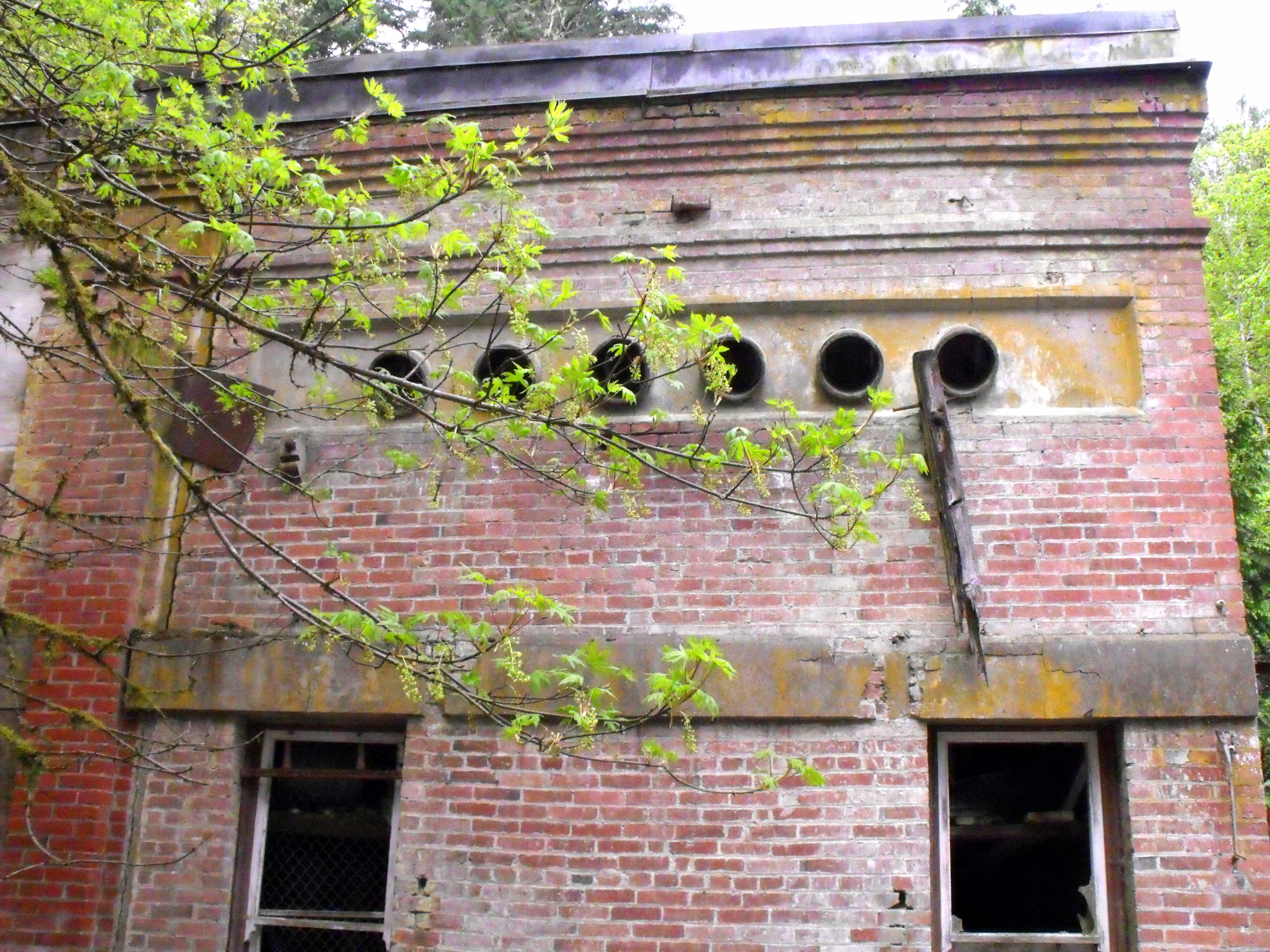
The powerlines would leave the structure here and begin their 19 km (12 mi) journey to Victoria.

At the turn of the century, the Lubbe Hydroelectric Plant was operated near Goldstream and created electricity by running high pressure drinking water through a turbine. A powerline then ran 12 miles (19 km) into Victoria and provided electricity to power the streetcars of the day. The plant still exists but is inaccessible to the public.

== Wildlife ==
Goldstream River and Goldstream Provincial Park host a wide variety of wildlife. In particular, Coho salmon spawn in the river in late October to November. Spawning season attracts a great number of visitors to the park. A large variety of west coast birds can be found by the river, with bald eagles and seagulls commonly seen consuming dead salmon after they have spawned.

== December 2010 prank ==
On December 29, 2010 fluorescein was dumped in the Goldstream River, likely as a prank. The result was that the waters turned a bright, glowing green. Health officials said the chemical is non-toxic, used primarily to find leaks in septic systems along with various medical applications. Some people may experience allergic reactions. As of January 10, 2011 it was unknown who dumped the chemical.

== See also ==
- List of rivers of British Columbia
- Goldstream Provincial Park
- Goldstream, British Columbia
- Leechtown, British Columbia
- Mount Finlayson
- Sooke Flowline
