= Kapoor Tunnel =

Water transport route in BC, Canada

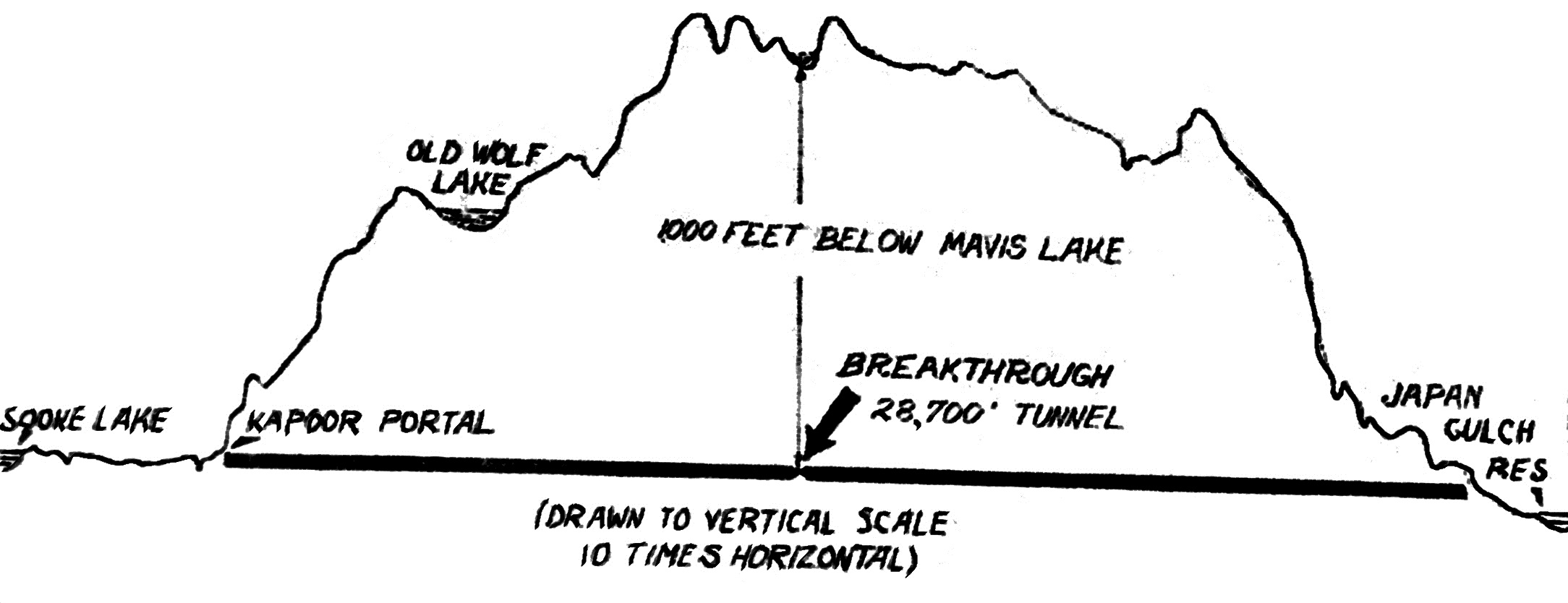
- The Kapoor Tunnel passes 1,000 ft (305 m) below two lakes.
- Begins: Sooke Lake Head Tank; 48.509520°N 123.691286°W
- Ends: Japan Gulch; 48.460766°N 123.573069°W
- Official name: Kapoor Tunnel
- Maintained by: Capital Regional District Integrated Water Services

Characteristics
- Total length: 8.8 km (5.5 mi)
- Width: 2.1 m (6 ft 11 in) max.
- Height: 2.1 m (6 ft 11 in) max.
- Capacity: 580,000 m^{3}/d (20,000,000 cu ft/d)

History
- Construction start: 1960
- Opened: 1970

The Kapoor Tunnel is a straight 8.8 km (5.5 mi) subterranean route which is the main transport of water from the Sooke Lake to the Westshore, City of Victoria, Esquimalt, and the Saanich Peninsula. When it was determined that the Sooke Flowline would no longer meet the region's needs, the decision was made to excavate the tunnel. Prior to construction of the flowline, Arthur Adams, the consultant for the flowline construction, had proposed the Kapoor Tunnel be built. However, that era's technology was not yet up to the task.

== Construction ==
The tunnel was formed by a miniature tunnel boring machine (TBM), which was built in Vancouver at a cost of $258,000. Excavation was undertaken from both ends with the intention of meeting in the middle. The machine was later abandoned and excavation was carried out manually due to the soft rock clogging the teeth and gears and causing motor burn outs. The contractor quit and the water district completed the task in 1967. On completion, the tunnel was an engineering success. Even without modern laser technology, the tunnel was joined only 6 in (152 mm) off line. The project was almost incident free with the only major injury occurring when a worker's eye was damaged while drilling into a hole containing an undetonated stick of dynamite.

The project was a challenging feat due to a variety of factors:

- The rock the tunnel was being bored through was a crumbly, unstable shale
- Close quarters meant that only one cart could travel in the tunnel at a time
- The tight space meant that only three men could work at the rock face, limiting progress to 7 metres (23 feet) per day
- Fresh air needed to be pumped in from the surface deep into the tunnel
- The narrow gauge railway restricted how much cement could be sent into the tunnel and slowed the lining process to 24 m (79 ft) per day.

== Route ==
The tunnel runs from the head tank near Sooke Lake, which maintains a constant pressure to the Japan Gulch UV Plant near Goldstream Provincial Park.

== Maintenance ==
This tunnel can convey 580 million litres/day, 10 times greater than the Sooke Flowline, and provides water to all municipalities, except Sooke and the Highlands. Its final cost was $5.6 million. The Sooke Flowline had been leaking and was vulnerable to blow downs and rock slides.

Every January, the tunnel is shut off and the city transfers over to the district's secondary Goldstream system. Workers walk the 8.8 km (5.5 mi) route to look for cracks and other defects.
