= Langford, British Columbia =

City in British Columbia, Canada

Langford
- City
- City of Langford
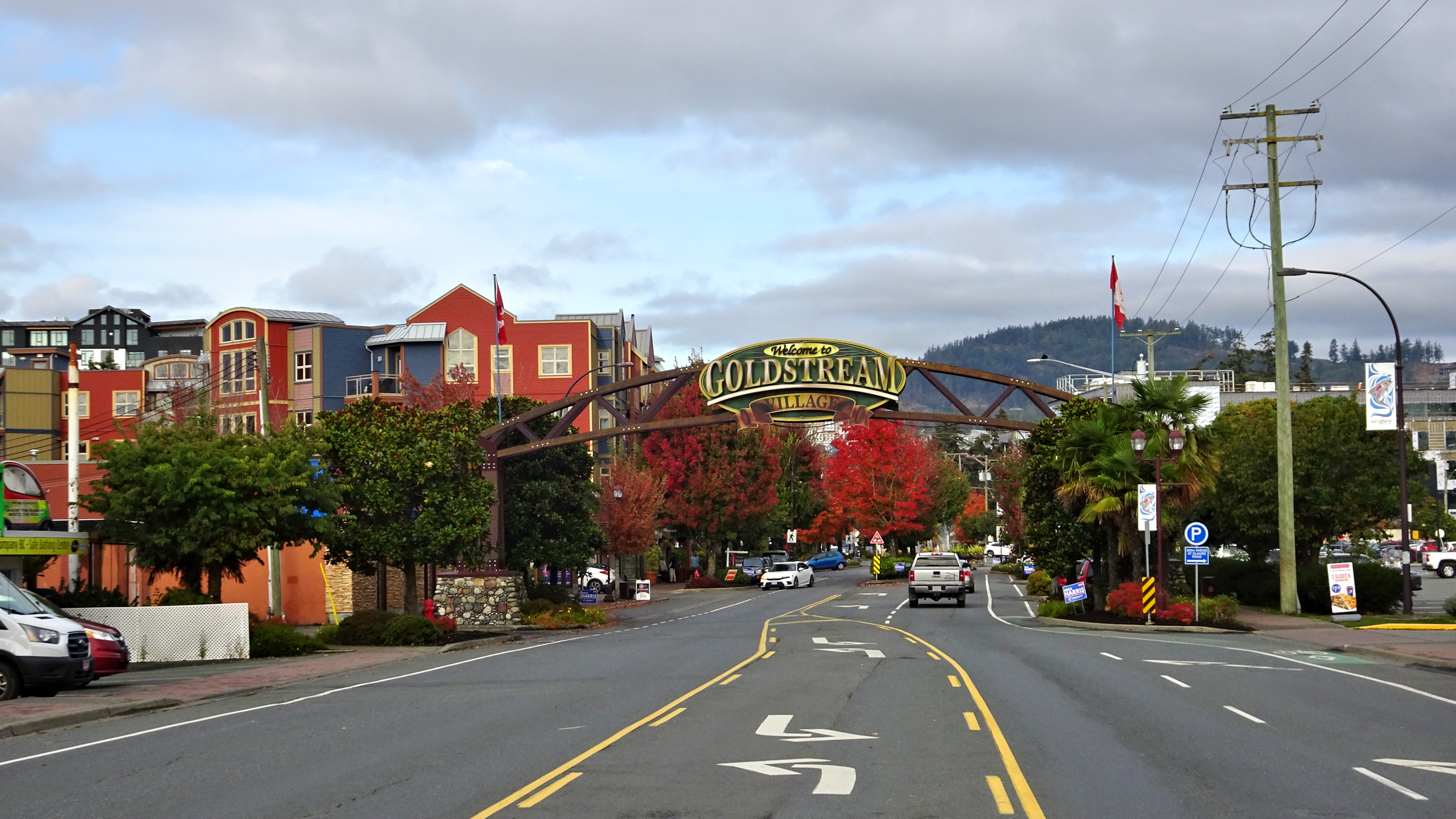
- Goldstream Village, centre of Langford

- Flag

- Location of Langford within the Capital Regional District

- Location of Langford within British Columbia Langford (British Columbia)
- Coordinates: 48°27′2″N 123°30′21″W
- Country: Canada
- Province: British Columbia
- Regional district: Capital
- Founded: 1851
- Incorporated: December 8, 1992

Government
  - Governing body: Langford City Council
  - Mayor: Stew Young

Area
  - Land: 41.43 km^{2} (16.00 sq mi)
- Elevation: 76 m (249 ft)

Population (2021)
  - Total: 46,584
  - Density: 1,124.4/km^{2} (2,912/sq mi)
- Demonym(s): Langfordite, Langfordian
- Time zone: UTC−7 (Pacific Time)
- Postal code: V9B, V9C
- Area codes: 250, 778, 236, 672
- Highways: Highway 1 (TCH), Highway 14
- Website: langford.ca

Langford is a city on southern Vancouver Island in the province of British Columbia, Canada. Langford is one of the 13 component municipalities of Greater Victoria and is within the Capital Regional District. Langford was incorporated in 1992 and has a population of over 40,000 people, the largest municipality in the Western Communities, and third-largest in the Capital Regional District after Saanich and Victoria.

Its motto is "Golden in setting, determined in Spirit," containing a reference to the natural beauty of the City of Langford, specifically Goldstream Provincial Park, and a comment on the community's drive to enhance Langford's special character and future.

== History ==
Langford's history of European settlement dates back to 1851, when Captain Edward Langford established one of the four Hudson's Bay Company farms in the Victoria area. He arrived with his family in 1851 as the first English family to emigrate to the Colony of Vancouver Island. He was the manager of the Esquimalt farm owned by the Puget Sound Agricultural Company, a subsidiary of the Hudson's Bay Company. He returned to England in 1861.

In the early 1860s, the region of Langford experienced a short-lived gold rush in what is now Goldstream Provincial Park. The area was once a favourite recreation destination for thousands of Victorians in the late 1800s: day-trippers travelled via the Canadian Pacific railway to the country resort Goldstream House Hotel; hunters built their lodges on the shores of the lakes near the mountains; and a summer colony of the well-to-do city folk relaxed and socialized at Langford Lake.

Langford was incorporated as a district on December 8, 1992, and became a city in 2003.

== Geography ==
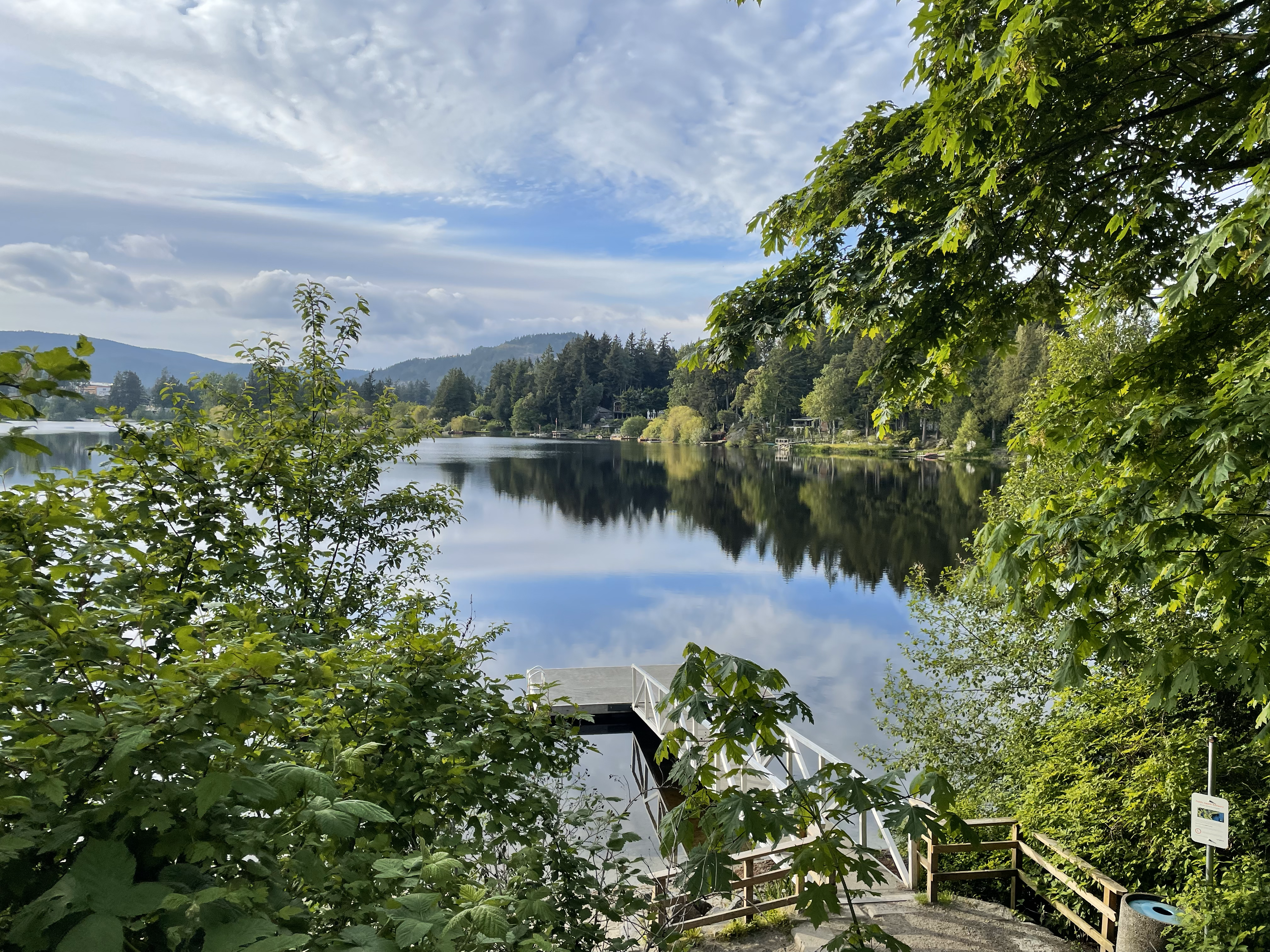
Glen Lake public access along the Galloping Goose Trail (2022)

Langford is the urban core of the five suburban municipalities comprising the region of West Shore for a combined population of about 75,000. Its municipal neighbours are Colwood to the southeast, Highlands to the north, Metchosin to the southwest, and View Royal to the northeast.

Notable physical features of Langford include the three prominent lakes (Langford Lake, Glen Lake and Florence Lake) stocked with trout, and the Humpback Reservoir, several peaks such as Mount Finlayson and Mount Wells, and the notable Goldstream Provincial Park. The Malahat drive, part of the Trans-Canada Highway, begins in Langford, and the Galloping Goose Regional Trail and the Island Rail Corridor cross the city.

Langford has a temperate climate with mild temperatures and distinct dry and rainy seasons. Most built-up areas in Langford are on basalt bedrock, while lower-lying regions of the Langford Plain from Langford Lake to Royal Bay are glacial till, and Happy Valley and Goldstream River valley are on deep sand of the Colwood Delta.

Old growth forestlands were once abundant in Langford but urban sprawl threatens natural habitat including coastal Douglas fir, western red cedar, arbutus trees and Garry oak ecosystems. The last remaining pockets of arbutus groves and Garry oak meadows are unique to southern Vancouver Island and only about five percent of the ecosystems remain in their natural state. The unique Mediterranean characteristics of the island's climate support the Garry oak ecosystem in the few remaining undeveloped areas of Langford, and are under threat due to rapid growth, high-density subdivisions, and urbanization.

=== Neighbourhoods ===
- (South) Langford Proper/ Goldstream Village/ Langford Lake
- Humpback/ Goldstream Meadows
- Westhills
- Glen Lake
- Luxton/ Happy Valley
- Triangle Mountain/ Walfred
- Olympic View/ Latoria
- Mill Hill/ Atkins
- North Langford/ Millstream
- Thetis Heights
- Florence Lake surrounded by temporate rain forest is home to the Hidden Valley Mobile home park
- Bear Mountain

== Demographics ==
In the 2021 Census of Population conducted by Statistics Canada, Langford had a population of 46,584 living in 19,050 of its 19,968 total private dwellings, a change of 31.8% from its 2016 population of 35,342. With a land area of 41.43 km^{2} (16.00 sq mi), it had a population density of 1,124.4/km^{2} (2,912.2/sq mi) in 2021.

Langford was ranked as the fastest growing community in British Columbia and the third fastest growing city in Canada in the 2021 census, attracting new residents from all over Greater Victoria, the Lower Mainland, Ontario, and Alberta due to new housing developments, a strong real estate market and affordability, a desirable temperate climate with warm, dry summers and mild, wet winters, ample amenities as the commercial centre of West Shore, and year-long recreational activities.

The median household income in 2015 for Langford was $80,331, which is almost 15% higher than the British Columbia provincial average of $69,995.

Historical census populations – Langford, British Columbia

Year	Pop.	±%
1996	17,515	—
2001	18,840	+7.6%
2006	22,459	+19.2%

Year	Pop.	±%
2011	29,228	+30.1%
2016	35,342	+20.9%
2021	46,584	+31.8%

Population counts are not adjusted for boundary changes.
Source: Statistics Canada

=== Ethnicity ===
Panethnic groups in the City of Langford (2001−2021)
Panethnic group	2021		2016		2011		2006		2001	
Panethnic group	Pop.	%	Pop.	%	Pop.	%	Pop.	%	Pop.	%
European (Note: Statistic includes all persons that did not make up part of a visible minority or an indigenous identity.)	35,845	77.6%	29,230	83.71%	25,220	87.1%	20,010	89.75%	17,160	91.94%
Indigenous	2,685	5.81%	2,090	5.99%	1,490	5.15%	940	4.22%	665	3.56%
Southeast Asian (Note: Statistic includes total responses of "Filipino" and "Southeast Asian" under visible minority section on census.)	1,935	4.19%	825	2.36%	410	1.42%	320	1.44%	55	0.29%
South Asian	1,880	4.07%	910	2.61%	690	2.38%	490	2.2%	270	1.45%
East Asian (Note: Statistic includes total responses of "Chinese", "Korean", and "Japanese" under visible minority section on census.)	1,720	3.72%	1,000	2.86%	655	2.26%	235	1.05%	225	1.21%
African	725	1.57%	250	0.72%	180	0.62%	100	0.45%	120	0.64%
Latin American	640	1.39%	375	1.07%	155	0.54%	85	0.38%	50	0.27%
Middle Eastern (Note: Statistic includes total responses of "West Asian" and "Arab" under visible minority section on census.)	390	0.84%	120	0.34%	80	0.28%	20	0.09%	0	0%
Other/multiracial (Note: Statistic includes total responses of "Visible minority, n.i.e." and "Multiple visible minorities" under visible minority section on census.)	370	0.8%	120	0.34%	55	0.19%	105	0.47%	100	0.54%
Total responses	46,190	99.15%	34,920	98.81%	28,955	99.07%	22,295	99.27%	18,665	99.07%
Total population	46,584	100%	35,342	100%	29,228	100%	22,459	100%	18,840	100%
Note: Totals greater than 100% due to multiple origin responses.

=== Religion ===
According to the 2021 census, religious groups in Langford included:

- Irreligion (28,590 persons or 61.9%)
- Christianity (14,450 persons or 31.3%)
- Islam (685 persons or 1.5%)
- Hinduism (625 persons or 1.4%)
- Sikhism (600 persons or 1.3%)
- Buddhism (370 persons or 0.8%)
- Judaism (220 persons or 0.5%)
- Indigenous Spirituality (65 persons or 0.1%)

== Amenities ==
Langford's city parks include City Centre Park, which has a family-friendly entertainment zone including a Family Fun Park, a bowling alley, and ice rink. Veterans Memorial Park is in the heart of downtown and, at its centre, is a cenotaph commemorating the men and women of the Canadian Forces who have given their lives in the line of duty. It is where Langford holds its yearly Remembrance Day ceremony on November 11.

Community events include parades, a seasonal farmer's market, the Summer Festival, and Luxton Fair in September. Rugby Canada has its headquarters in Langford practising at Starlight Stadium. A $30 million YMCA/YWCA Aquatic Centre that opened in May 2016, acclaimed by the mayor to be the "biggest project in the history of Langford", and features multiple pools, recreation facilities and a new library.

Langford is home to several golf courses, including the Bear Mountain Resort on Skirt Mountain. The golf resort offers a system of mountain bike trails as the training centre for the Canadian National Mountain Bike Team.

There are many lakes in the area for fishing, swimming, and non-motorized boating, including Langford, Glen, and Florence Lake. Langford has many nature parks and a network of trails for hikers and walkers, including Mill Hill Park, Mount Wells, Thetis Lake Regional Park, and Mount Finlayson. The multi-use Galloping Goose Trail, formerly a Canadian National Railway line, moves through urban and rural parts of Langford and is used as a commuter trail to downtown Victoria, which is approximately 45 minutes away by bicycle. The Trans Canada Trail goes through the city as well. Goldstream Provincial Park is a large 477-hectare (1,180-acre) nature reserve home to old-growth trees, waterfalls, estuaries, and a visitor centre and Nature House. It has many visitor activities, such as camping, picnicking, hiking, and wildlife watching. Every autumn, there is the annual salmon run.

== Services ==
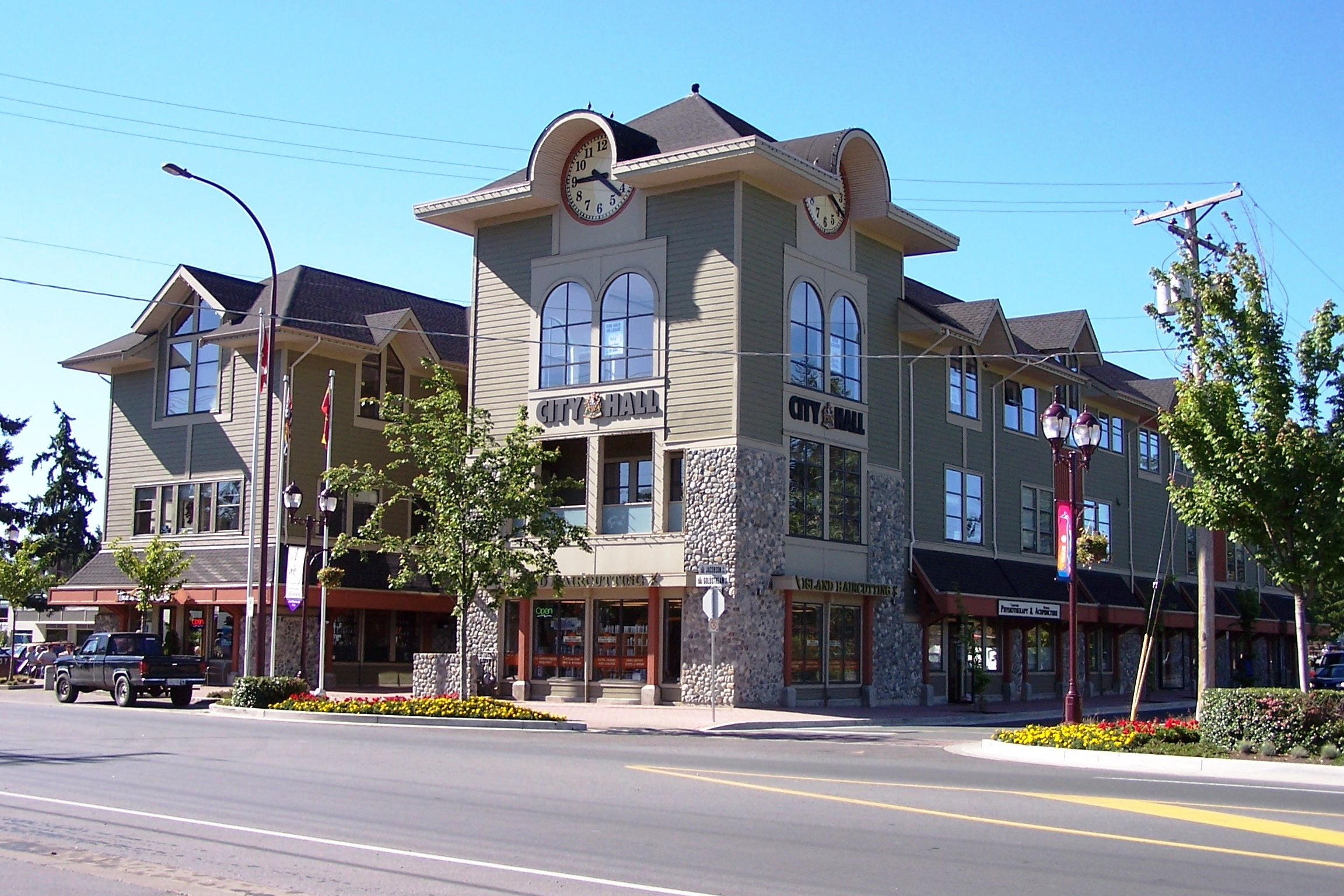
Langford City Hall

Langford has three fire stations with a mix of volunteer and career members.

The region is policed by the West Shore detachment of the Royal Canadian Mounted Police. Additionally, Langford is also home to the central BC Ambulance 911 call centre, Ambulance Station 109 located at 2764 Leigh Rd, which provides 911 dispatch services to Vancouver Island and the surrounding islands.

== Education ==
Langford is a part of the School District 62 Sooke with approximately 12,900 students in 2023. The school district serves the communities of Sooke, Port Renfrew, Metchosin, Colwood, Highlands, and Langford. Ten of the 25 schools are in Langford including one middle school and one high school. In 2015, two new state-of-the-art high schools were built to a LEED Gold standard to replace the 65-year-old Belmont high school: lake-front Belmont Secondary School (the largest on Vancouver Island) in Langford with a capacity of 1,200-students, and the ocean-side Royal Bay Secondary School in Colwood with 800 students. Both high schools are already overcapacity due to rapidly expanding region. There is also the Westshore Centre for Learning and Training, and the Lighthouse Christian Academy which serves Kindergarten to Grade 12.

== Notable people ==
- Tyson Barrie, NHL player
- Ryder Hesjedal, Canadian Olympian and professional racing cyclist
- John Horgan, former Premier of British Columbia
- Moka Only, musician
- Bob Rock, musician
- Dustin Hawthorne, musician
- Jennifer Tilly, actor
- Meg Tilly, actor
