= Goldstream Powerhouse =

Hydroelectric plant in Victoria, Canada

Coordinates: 48°27′50″N 123°35′6″W

The Goldstream Powerhouse is a decommissioned hydroelectric plant located near Goldstream Provincial Park in Langford, near Victoria, British Columbia. This plant provided electricity to Victoria for 60 years and is one of the little-known and ingenious chapters in the history of Victoria. This plant was one of the first hydro plants of this type on the west coast of North America. The structure is over a century old and is unsafe to inhabit. It is within the boundaries of the watershed lands owned by the CRD and is inaccessible to the public due to its proximity to a drinking water reservoir.

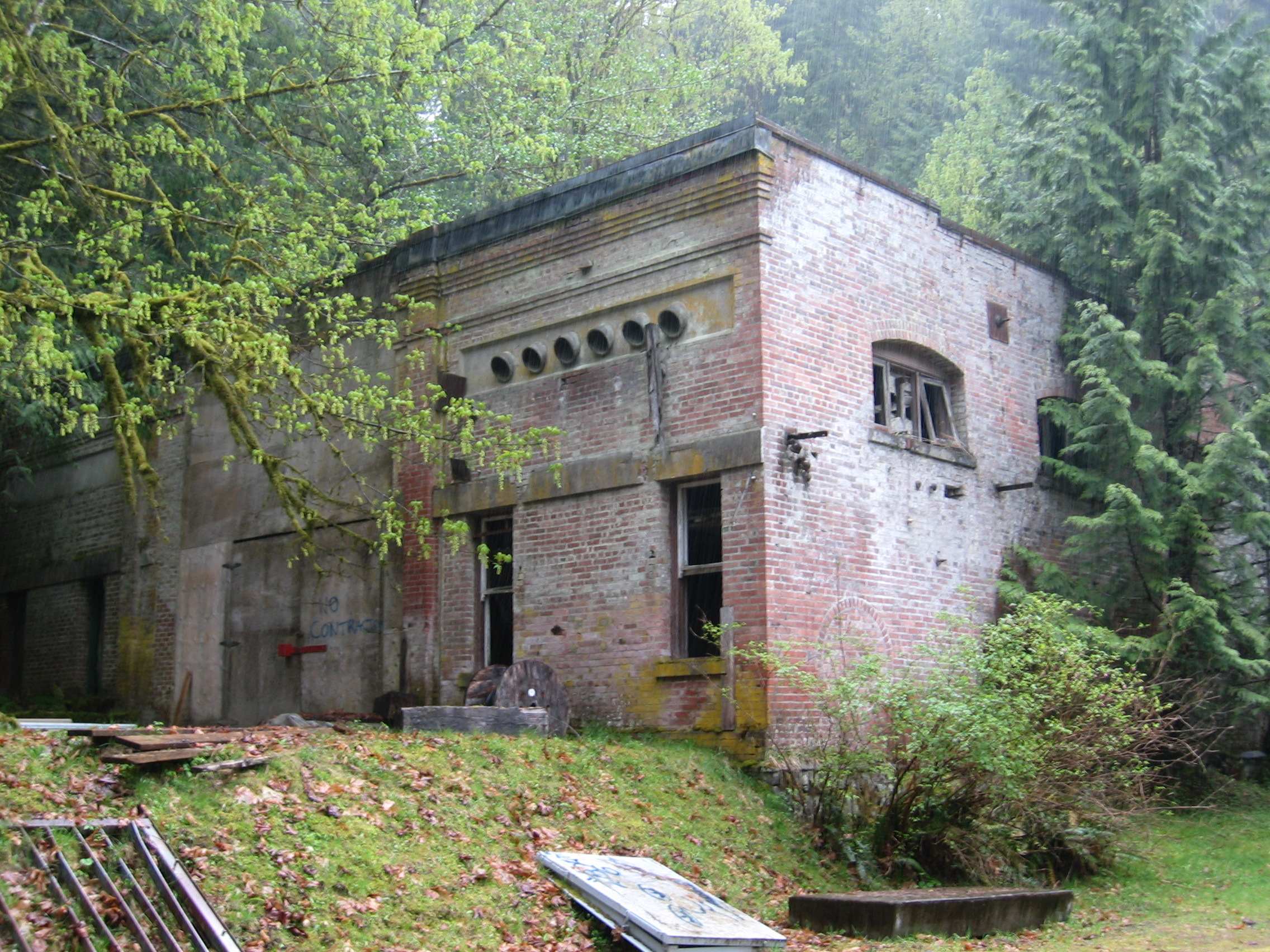
The Goldstream Powerhouse

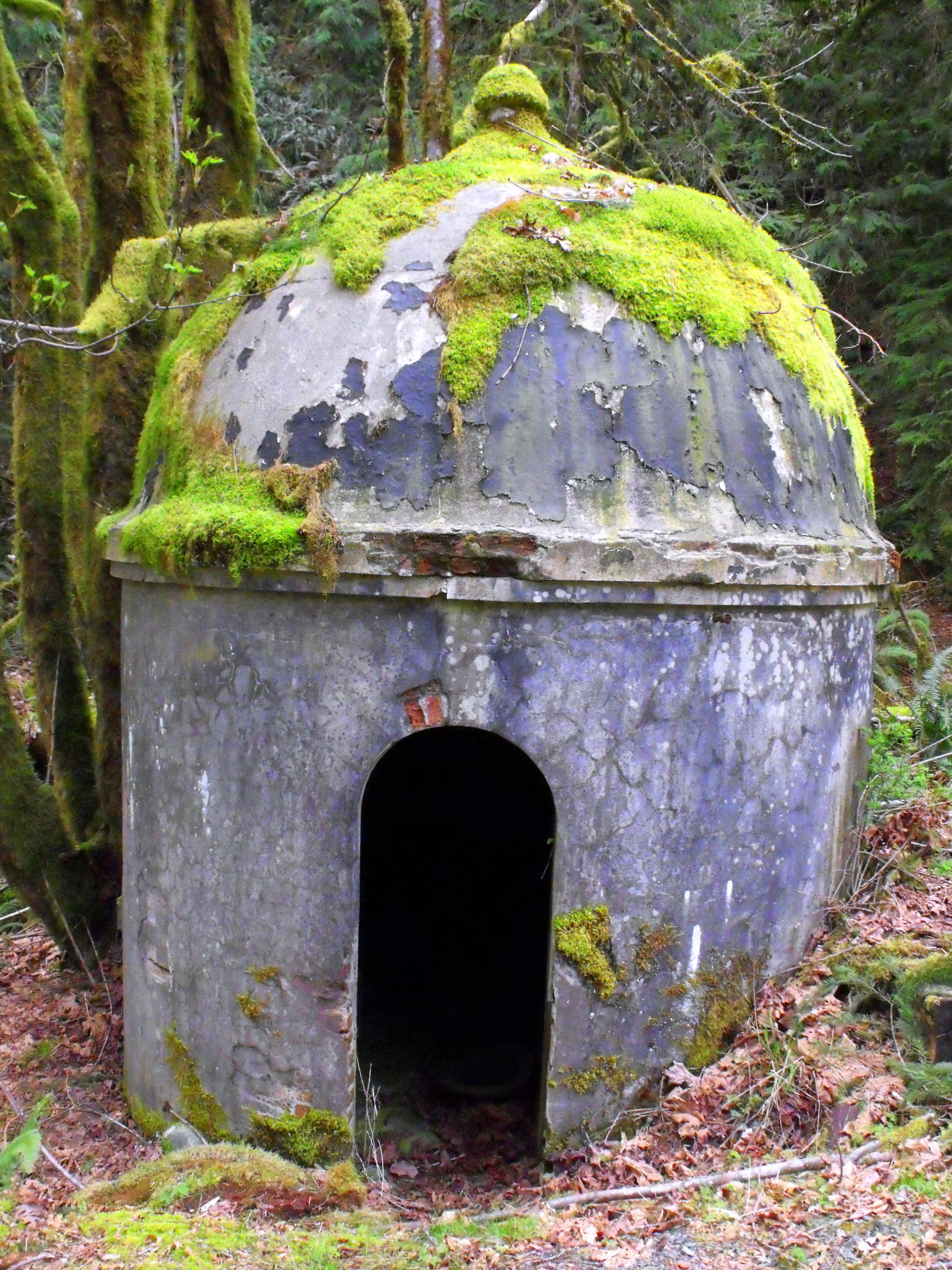
Valve Building

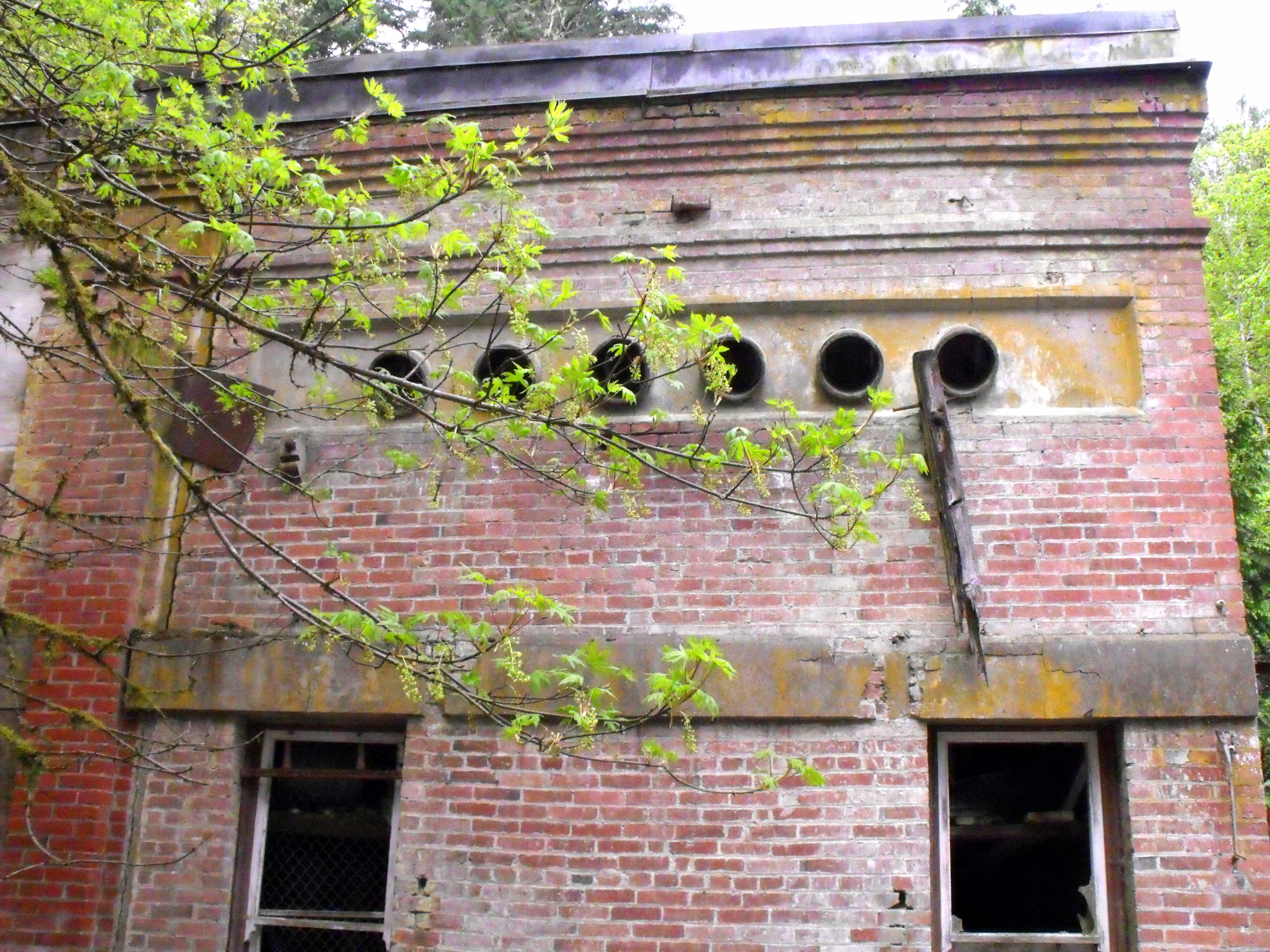
The powerlines would leave the structure here and begin their 12 miles (19 km) journey to Victoria.

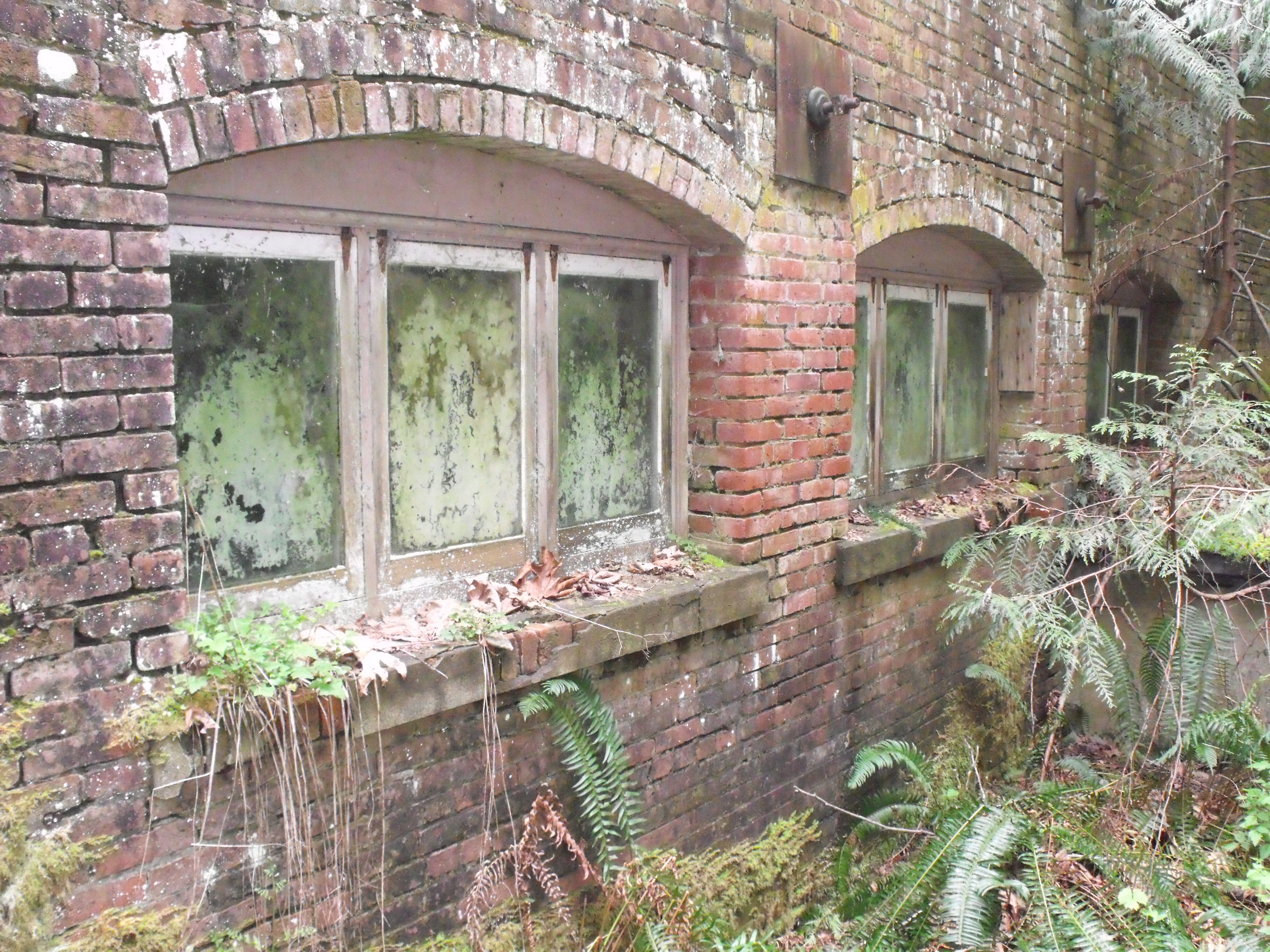
A row of windows

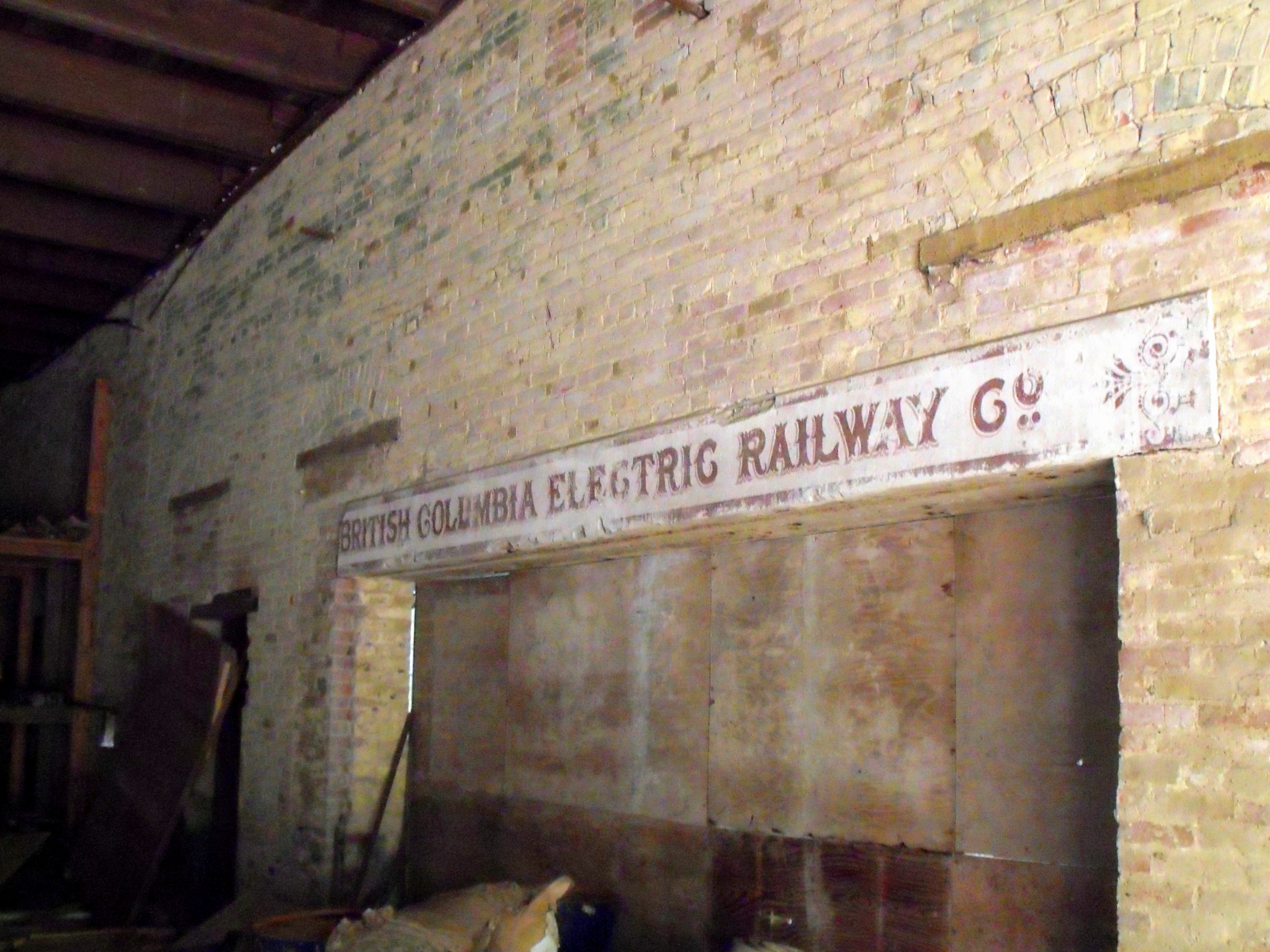
The only lasting remnant of the plant's past

== Overview ==
In 1897, Esquimalt Waterworks Company (EWWC) and British Columbia Electric Railway (BCER) came to an agreement to generate power by using the water from the high elevation reservoirs to generate electricity. The water would be run through Pelton waterwheels, where the water would then flow into the Japan Gulch Reservoir and subsequently be used for domestic purposes. The plant was expanded in 1898 and again in 1905, each time adding another turbine.

The Goldstream Plant was staffed by full time operators, who recorded in their journals the daily activities, comings and goings, and events. A day excursion on the E & N Railway to the Powerhouse was a popular event in the early years of operation. Other entries tell of hobos riding the rails and spending the night at Goldstream. Located along the Cowichan Waggon (sic) Road, the powerhouse meant a long walk for the residents of the Lubbe House, (located only a short distance from the powerhouse, and associated with its early history), whose children reportedly used to walk to town and back.

The Jordan River Hydroelectric Dam came online in 1912 and dwarfed the Lubbe plant. Turbines one and two were taken offline and the plant continued to operate until 1957 as a 1500 KW facility. Rumours tell that the plant was torn down but the building in fact still exists to this day.

=== Construction ===
The heavy equipment and supplies for the powerhouse were shipped in on the E&N Railway, not far from the construction site. Following the offloading of equipment, the components were hauled up the road with manual labour using horses and block and tackle.

=== Power generation ===
Before the plant, the only source of electricity was a coal fired power plant located in Rock Bay. The electricity from this plant provided power to the city's streetcars of the day, as per an agreement with the BCER.

The plant fed upon water sourced from the Cabin Pond Reservoir located 655 feet (200 m) above the powerhouse. From there, it was transported down a 7,920 feet (2,410 m), 33-inch (84 cm), riveted steel pipeline to the powerhouse with an immense pressure of 285 pounds per square inch (1,970 kPa).

=== Plant schematics ===
The building's dimensions are 42 feet (13 m) x 24 feet (7.3 m) x 56 feet (17 m) and contains three rooms. The first room contained the generators, while another housed the Pelton waterwheels, and the third, the transformers. Following the closure of the plant, the equipment was scavenged and was sold in the basement of the Capital Iron store, located in Victoria, and was lost to history. All that remains is the structure itself and a British Columbia Electric Railway sign, which cannot be safely removed.

=== Turbines ===
The plant began with two Pelton waterwheels, likely manufactured in San Francisco. Additions were made later on as the electricity demand grew.

- Turbine 1: 38 inches (0.97 m) : 360 KW (included with plant construction)
- Turbine 2: 38 inches (0.97 m) : 360 KW (included with plant construction)
- Turbine 3: 54 inches (1.4 m) : 500 KW (added 1898)
- Turbine 4: 1000 KW (added 1905)

== Esquimalt Waterworks Company ==
At the beginning of settlement in the region, Victoria and Esquimalt had an adversarial relationship. Victoria had developed Elk Lake as a water supply, while Esquimalt had attempted to exploit Thetis Lake. Using Thetis Lake had ultimately been a failure because it was simply too small, and as a result was only used for three years. The company, headed by entrepreneur Theodore Lubbe, then turned to a series of lakes located northwest of the city. Using mainly Asian labourers, seven lakes were developed.

=== The lakes ===
==== Secondary sources ====
These lakes are currently used as a secondary drinking water source by the CRD. Every January, the CRD switches to this system in order to allow inspection of the Kapoor Tunnel, the main artery transporting water to the city from Sooke Lake. The dams on these lakes underwent a $3.5 million refit in 1995 due to concerns about seismic stability.

- Goldstream Lake
- Lubbe Lake
- Butchart Lake
- Japan Gulch

==== Decommissioned sources ====
These lakes have been decommissioned and are being allowed to return to nature. It was determined that the Mavis and Jack Lake dams would need a seismic refit as well. The decision was made to release the water from these reservoirs, since these sources were no longer required. Cabin Pond has two cabins on its shore where watershed caretakers once took up residence. These lakes are now a part of the Sea to Sea Regional Park Reserve and public access is not permitted.

- Cabin Pond (the Lubbe plant's source)
- Mavis Lake
- Jack Lake

== See also ==
- Sooke Flowline
