= Jordan River Dam =

Dam on the Jordan River, British Columbia, Canada

Jordan River Diversion Dam
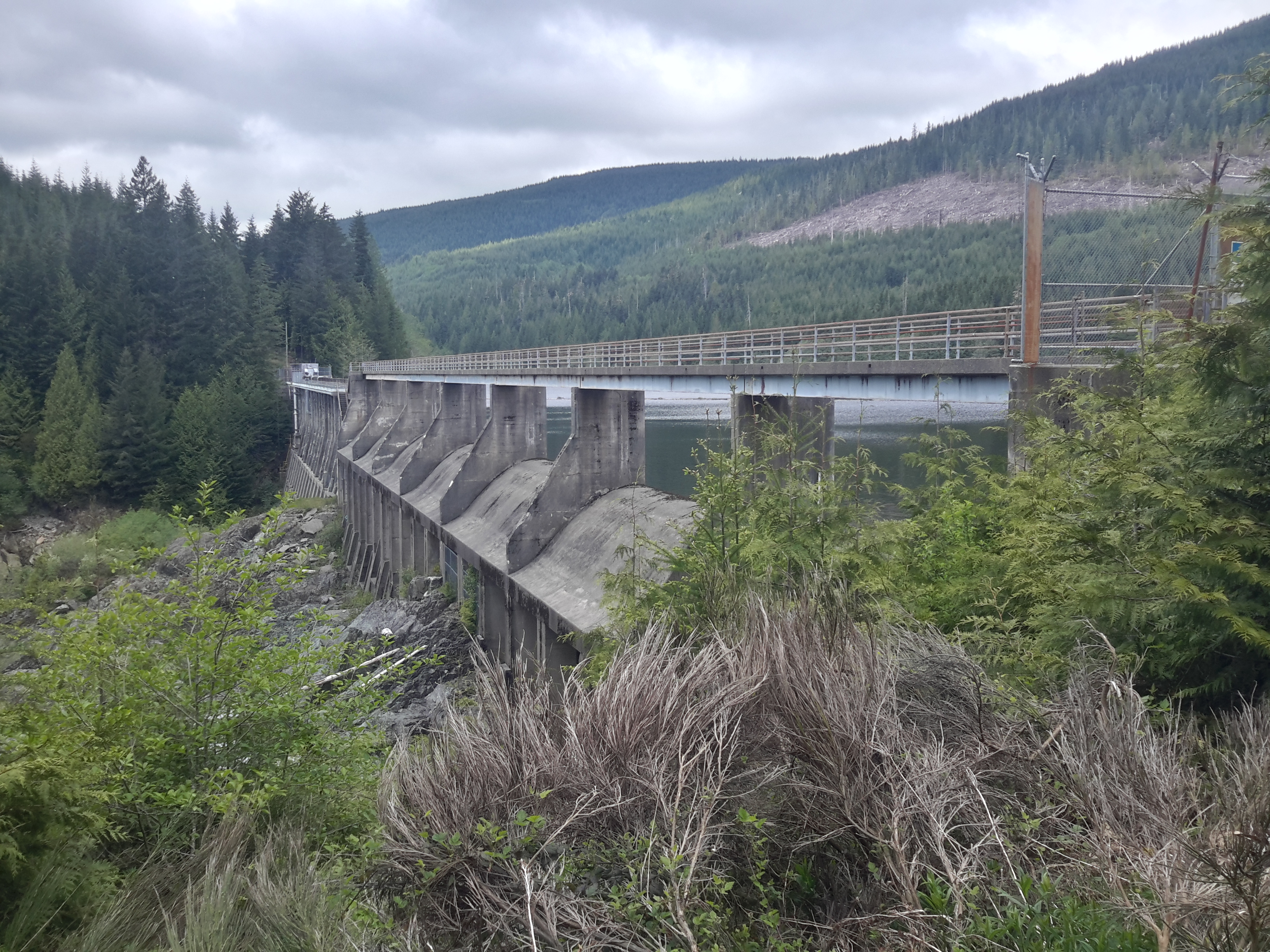
- The Jordan River Diversion Dam
- Interactive map of Jordan River Diversion Dam
- Country: Canada
- Location: Jordan River, British Columbia
- Coordinates: 48.49654°N 123.99301°W
- Purpose: Hydroelectricity
- Status: Operational
- Opening date: 1911
- Built by: Vancouver Island Power Company
- Owner: BC Hydro
- Operator: BC Hydro

Dam and spillways
- Impounds: Jordan River
- Height (foundation): 126 feet (38.4 m)

Reservoir
- Creates: Jordan River Diversion Reservoir
- Total capacity: 20.5×10^{6} m^{3} (1.66×10^{4} acre⋅ft)
- Surface area: 18 km^{2} (6.9 sq mi)

Jordan River Generating Station
- Coordinates: 48.4294°N 124.0530°W
- Operator: BC Hydro
- Commission date: 1911 (original); 1971 (current)
- Type: Conventional
- Hydraulic head: 330 feet (101 m)
- Turbines: 1 × Francis turbine
- Installed capacity: 175–183 MW

The Jordan River Diversion Dam, known locally simply as Diversion Dam, is a dam on the Jordan River in Jordan River, British Columbia, Canada. Part of a multi-dam hydroelectric system operated by BC Hydro, the facility provides approximately 35% of Vancouver Island's generating capacity. It was the second hydroelectric development on Vancouver Island, succeeding the Goldstream Powerhouse.

== History ==
=== Construction and early years ===
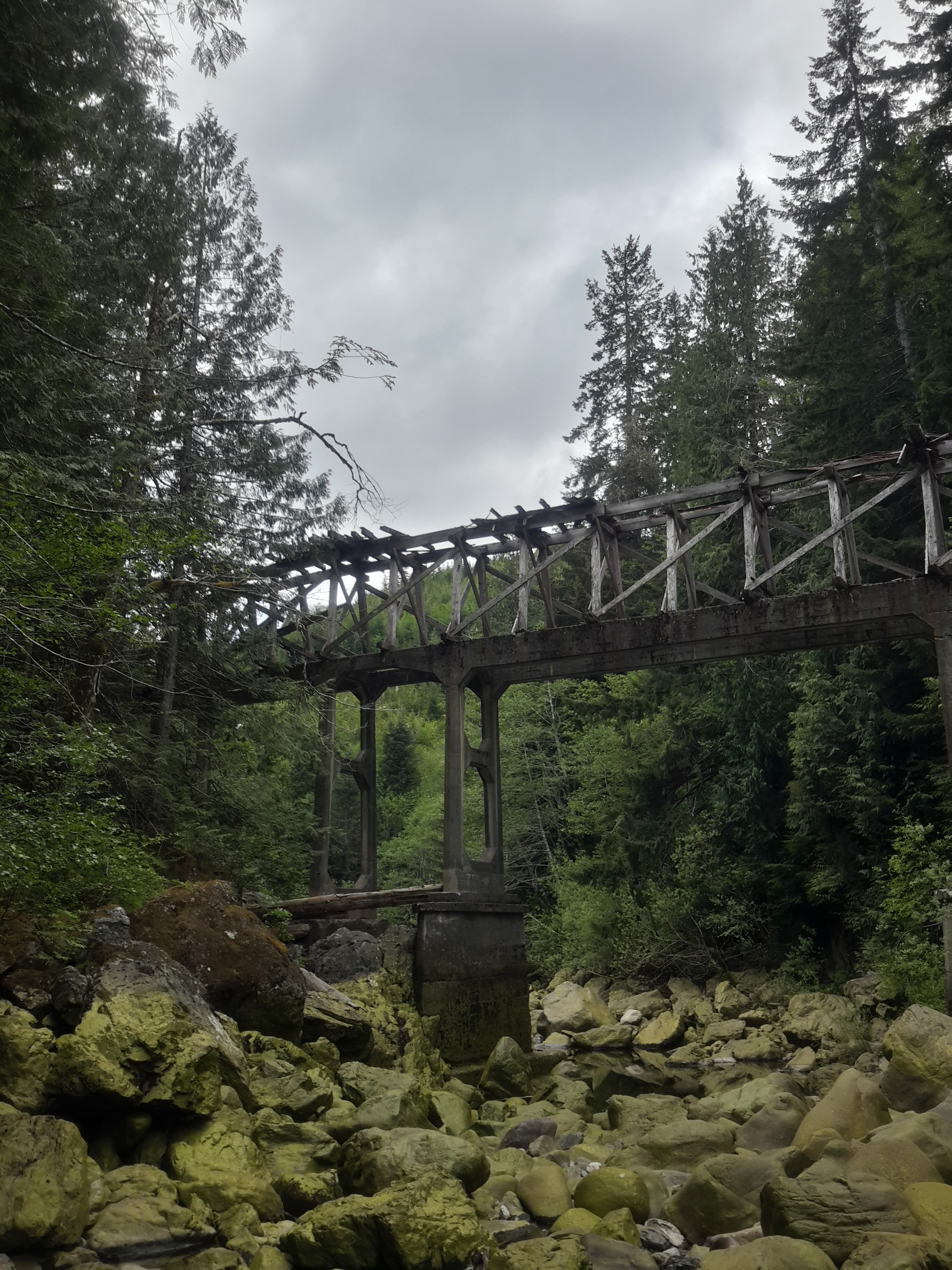
The largest of the disused trestles formerly shared by the flume and the railway.

Prior to the dam's construction, the Goldstream Powerhouse was the main source of electricity to Victoria. The Jordan River facility dwarfed the previous plant upon its completion.

The Vancouver Island Power Company, a subsidiary of the British Columbia Electric Railway, completed construction of both the smaller Bear Creek Dam and the main Jordan River Diversion Dam in 1911. At 126 feet (38.4 m) from top to bottom, the Diversion Dam was, upon completion, the highest dam in Canada. Water flowed through a 31,600 feet (9.6 km) long flume to a penstock above the power house.

The dam's remote location required the construction of a 3-foot (0.91 m) narrow gauge railway and a cable-railway for the initial ascent from the Jordan River valley. From 1912 to 1931, continual improvements and additional generators increased the capacity of the power house to 26 megawatts.

=== 1971 modernisation ===
In 1971, the original flume was replaced by a 7 kilometres (4.3 mi) tunnel, with a penstock feeding a new power house situated across the river from the original. The accompanying service railway was dismantled the same year. A single high-head Francis turbine and generator manufactured by Fuji Electric of Japan replaced the earlier equipment, increasing power output from 26 megawatts to 175–183 megawatts.

== System description ==
The Jordan River hydroelectric system comprises several interconnected components. Water collected at Bear Creek Dam and the Diversion Dam feeds the Jordan River Diversion Reservoir, the largest impoundment in the system, with a surface area of approximately 18 square kilometres (6.9 sq mi) and a licensed full supply storage of about 20.5×10^{6} m^{3}, roughly equivalent to 3.5 days of generation capacity.

From there, the Jack Elliott equalization reservoir (a much smaller headpond of about 1.6 square kilometres (0.62 sq mi) at full pool, holding only a few hours of storage) regulates flow into an 8.8 kilometres (5.5 mi) long tunnel. Water then drops through a steel penstock over the final 330 feet (101 m) of vertical height before reaching the turbine at the generating station near the river mouth.

== Seismic hazard and community impact ==
A 2014 BC Hydro study concluded that the Jordan River dam faced the highest seismic hazard in BC Hydro's system. A magnitude 8–9 Cascadia subduction zone earthquake could potentially cause the dam to collapse, sending a flood wave downstream into the small Jordan River village on the coastal plain.

BC Hydro identified 11 homes within the evacuation zone that would likely be destroyed in a worst-case dam failure scenario. The utility offered to purchase all at-risk properties and ultimately negotiated buyouts for all but one. Nearly all waterfront properties below the dam were cleared, while the remainder of the village, located outside the predicted flood zone, was deemed safe.

== Indigenous relations ==
The Jordan River system lies on the unceded traditional territory of the Pacheedaht First Nation (diitiida). In June 2018, BC Hydro and the Pacheedaht agreed to transfer approximately 28 hectares (69 acres) of the Jordan River "origin site" back to the Nation. The land transfer followed the 2014 seismic review and associated property buyouts, and was described as a historic repatriation of traditional lands. There is no public record of a specific land claim or impact-benefit agreement tied solely to the dam beyond this voluntary land transfer. The Pacheedaht continue to negotiate a broader treaty with the governments of Canada and British Columbia.

== Ecology and water use planning ==
Historically, the Jordan River supported runs of several anadromous salmonid species, including pink, chum, and coho salmon, as well as steelhead (anadromous rainbow trout) and sea-run coastal cutthroat trout. Prior to mid-twentieth-century development, thousands of chum and pink salmon spawned in the river.

In 1996, the provincial government initiated a Water Use Planning (WUP) program, requiring British Columbia's water licence holders to demonstrate their ability to manage the potential environmental impact of reservoirs. The Jordan River WUP, begun in 2001, identified the legacy Sunro copper mine in the lower watershed as the chief barrier to salmon recovery. The plan specified that remediation of the mine site, including cleanup of tailings and toxic residues, should be pursued to improve fish habitat, and that completion of such remediation should trigger a review of the WUP. Other measures included maintaining minimum flows below Elliott Dam for resident trout and creating a wetland in the Diversion Reservoir drawdown zone to replace lost habitat.

== See also ==
- HVDC Vancouver Island
- Powerlines connecting Vancouver Island with Canadian Mainland
- List of generating stations in BC
- List of dams and reservoirs in Canada
- Lubbe Powerhouse
- Goldstream Powerhouse
