= Mount Wells Regional Park =

National park near Langford, British Columbia, Canada

- Interactive map of Mount Wells Regional Park
- Location: British Columbia, Canada
- Nearest city: Langford
- Coordinates: 48°26′52.25″N 123°33′19.57″W
- Area: 1.23 km^{2} (0.47 sq mi)
- Established: 1994
- Governing body: CRD Parks

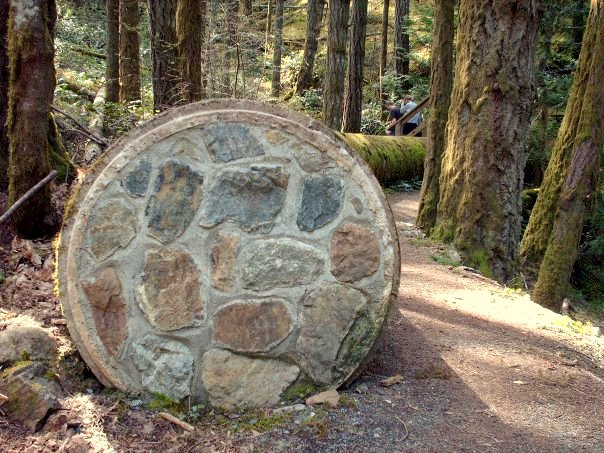
A pipe segment of the Sooke Flowline cut out for the trail up the mountain.

Mount Wells is a small regional park located northwest of the City of Langford and in the nearby vicinity of Goldstream Provincial Park and the Sooke Hills Regional Park Reserve.

The parking lot is located at Humpback Lake, a former reservoir. The terminus of the decommissioned Sooke Flowline is also located here where the water from Sooke Lake would empty.

== Hiking ==
The park features one trail which leads to the 352 m (1,155 ft) summit. The 1.3 km (0.81 mi) trail takes about 45 minutes to reach the summit which provides a panoramic view of the region. Across the valley stands Mount McDonald in the Sooke Hills Regional Park Reserve which is closed to all public access.

== Rock Climbing ==
The side of the mountain facing the Humpback Valley is a popular climbing destination due to its steep cliffs. On a hot summer day, numerous vehicles can be seen parked along Humpback Road where climbers follow various deer trails to the cliffs.
