= Goldstream =

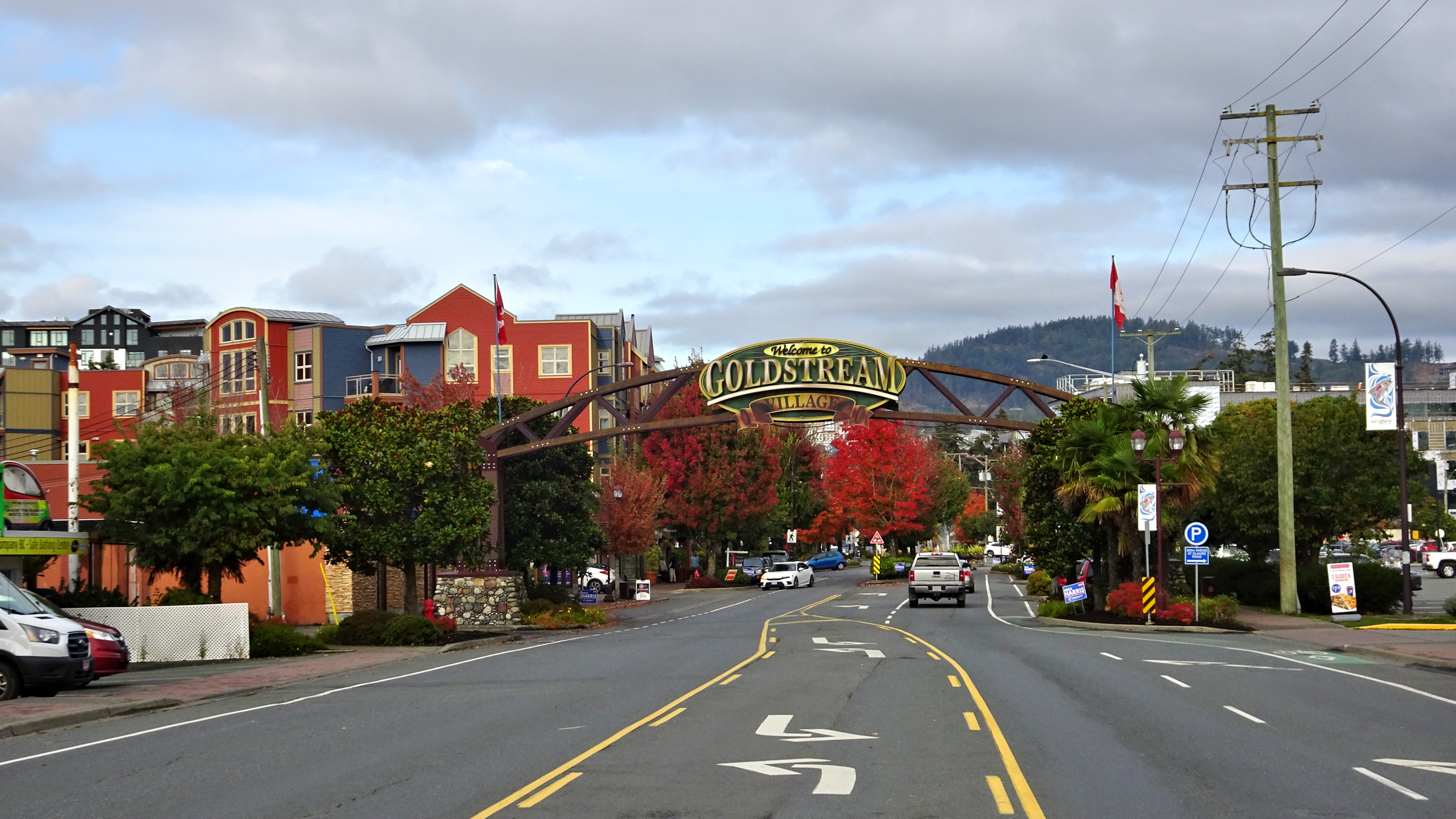
- Goldstream Village

- Location of Goldstream in British Columbia
- Coordinates: 48°27′27″N 123°33′05″W
- Country: Canada
- Province: British Columbia
- Regional district: Capital
- Municipality: Langford
- Time zone: UTC−07:00 (Pacific Time)
- Area codes: 250, 778

Two different neighbourhoods located in Langford, British Columbia, Canada in Greater Victoria on southern Vancouver Island include the name Goldstream.

Goldstream Meadows is a neighbourhood in the city of Langford, on the northwest outskirts of Greater Victoria, British Columbia, Canada. The community is located just west of Langford Lake and the Trans-Canada Highway and adjacent to the river of the same name, which was the scene of a small gold rush in the 1860s. At the turn of the century, the Lubbe Hydroelectric Plant was operated near Goldstream and created electricity by running high pressure drinking water through a turbine. A powerline then ran 12 miles (19 km) into Victoria and provided electricity to power the streetcars of the day. The plant still exists but is inaccessible to the public.

Goldstream Village is located in Langford Proper, considered the downtown heart of the city. The area is only a few square kilometres, located along Goldstream Ave on south side of the city starting at Veterans Memorial Park to the east and ending at Langford Lake to the west (Goldstream Meadows located on far west side of Langford Lake). Veterans Memorial Park is an urban park and home to the Goldstream Farmer's Market and Remembrance Day ceremonies. The village is the central hub of the city containing many small businesses such as retail boutiques, cafes, barber shop, library, police station and City Hall. The Langford trolley services is a transportation service provided by the city and picks up and drops off riders in the village by donation. The neighbourhood consists of a mix of high density condos, townhouses and single home residences. It is a close-knit community with a vibrant, walkable streetscape containing the amenities of a big city but having the appearance and feel of a small town. Festivals, parades, and other city events are often rooted in the downtown village. The area has been the focus of major enhancement work over the years and has received many beautification projects such as the construction of an archway entrance, musical fountain round-about, wide red brick sidewalks, and colourful flowerbeds.

== See also ==
- List of rivers of British Columbia
- Leechtown, British Columbia
- Goldstream Provincial Park
