= Mount Finlayson =

Mountain in British Columbia, Canada

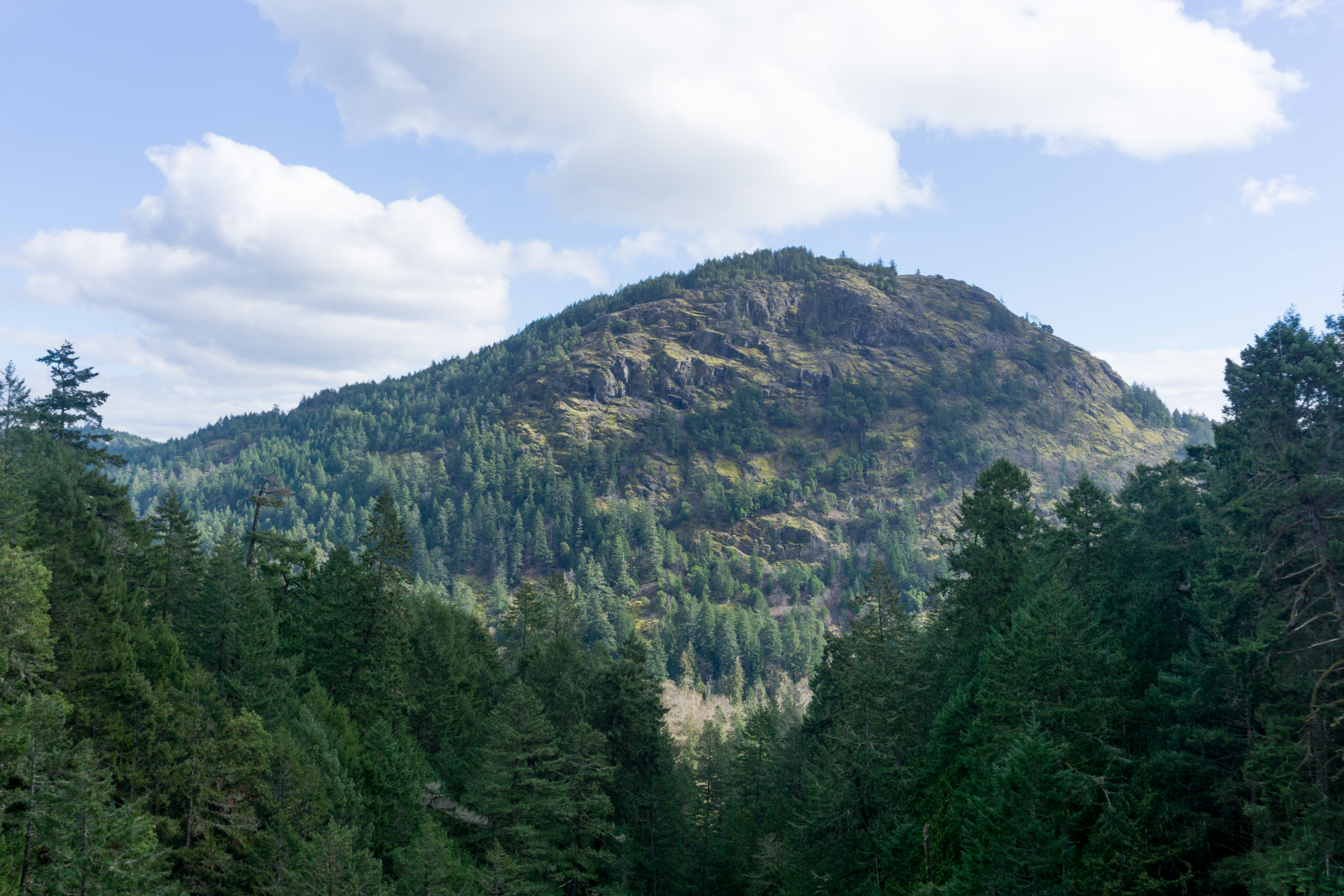
- The west face of Mount Finlayson

Highest point
- Elevation: 419 m (1,375 ft)
- Prominence: 249 m (817 ft)
- Listing: Mountains of British Columbia
- Coordinates: 48°28′57″N 123°32′17″W

Geography
- Location in Goldstream Provincial Park
- Location: Vancouver Island, British Columbia, Canada
- District: Highland Land District
- Parent range: Gowlland Range
- Topo map: NTS 92B5 Sooke

Mount Finlayson is a 419-metre (1,375 ft) mountain located on the border of Highlands and Langford, British Columbia, about 14 km northwest of Victoria.

Mount Finlayson is located within the Gowlland Range (part of the Vancouver Island Ranges). It is bordered by Goldstream Provincial Park and Gowlland Tod Provincial Park and forms an imposing feature looming above Saanich Inlet for those travelling south on the Malahat Drive portion of Highway 1. A steep trail leading up to the summit is easily accessible from Goldstream Park. There are also trails that link up to the summit from Bear Mountain.

From the top of the mountain there are views of the Greater Victoria area, Strait of Juan de Fuca, Olympic Mountain range and Mount Baker.
