= HVDC Vancouver Island =

De-energized high-voltage direct current interconnection

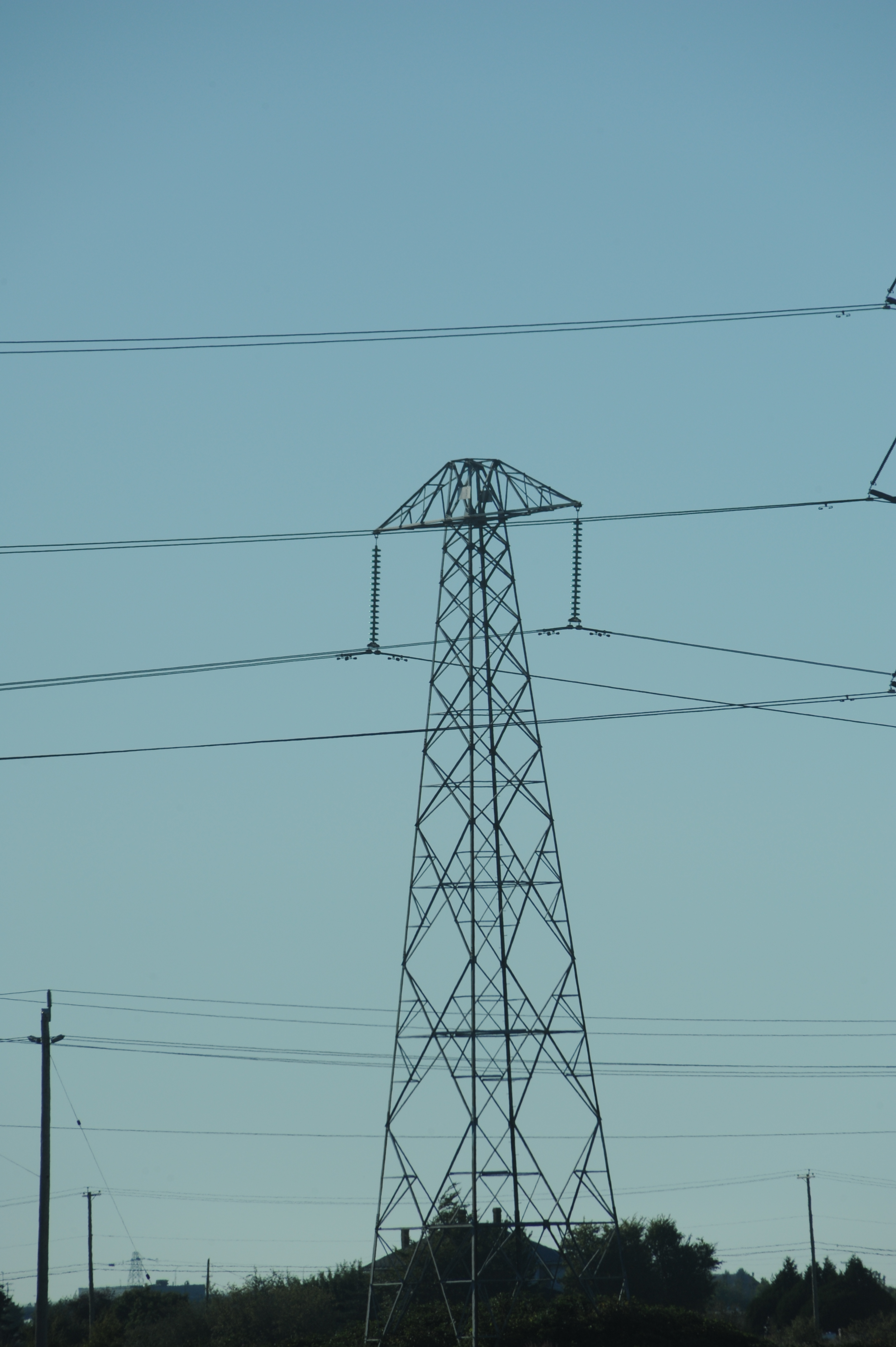
- HVDC Vancouver Island pylon
- Map of HVDC Vancouver Island

Location
- Country: Canada
- State: British Columbia
- Coordinates: 48°49′39″N 123°42′55″W
- From: Delta, British Columbia
- To: Duncan, British Columbia

Ownership information
- Owner: BC Hydro
- Operator: BC Hydro

Construction information
- Substation installer: ASEA
- Commissioned: Pole 1: 1968; Pole 2: 1977
- Decommissioned: Pole 1: 2014; Pole 2: 2016

Technical information
- Type: Multi-terminal
- Current type: HVDC
- Total length: 75 km (47 mi)
- Capacity: 370 MW
- DC voltage: 280 kV

HVDC Vancouver Island is a de-energized high-voltage direct current interconnection owned by BC Hydro that runs between Arnott Substation (ARN) in Delta, British Columbia at 49°5′31″N 123°2′31″W on the Canadian mainland, and the Vancouver Island Terminal (VIT) in Duncan, British Columbia on Vancouver Island at 48°49′39″N 123°42′55″W. It went into operation in 1968 and was extended in 1977. HVDC Vancouver Island consists of three overhead line sections with a total length of 42 km (26 mi) and two submarine cable sections with a length of 33 km (21 mi). There were two 600 amp cables for Pole 1, one 600 amp cable for neutral current return, and two 900 amp cables for Pole 2. Pole 1 ceased operation in 2014, and Pole 2 ceased operation in 2016. The infrastructure remains in place and portions may be re-used in the future.

== Route ==
After its departure from Arnott Substation, the overhead power line on the mainland splits at 49°3′38″N 123°4′30″W into two branches, one running to the Canoe Pass Terminal at 49°3′6″N 123°7′22″W and the other running to the Tsawwassen Beach Terminal at 49°1′40″N 123°6′1″W, where the first submarine cable section begins.

At 48°55′07″N 123°24′15″W, the first submarine cable section ends and a short overhead line section running south-west across Galiano Island starts. The overhead line leaves Galiano Island south of Montague Harbour in an 880-metre-long span, which starts at 48°52′51″N 123°23′21″W and ends on Parker Island at 48°52′48″N 123°24′04″W.

A little to the west, on Parker Island at 48°52′45″N 123°24′9″W, the overhead line ends and the second submarine cable section begins. At 48°51′2″N 123°25′31″W the cable reaches Salt Spring Island and the third overhead line section starts. It crosses Salt Spring Island west-south-westerly. North of Maxwell Point at 48°49′54″N 123°33′50″W and Arbutus Point at 48°49′40″N 123°35′21″W the overhead line crosses Sansum Narrows, the strait between Salt Spring Island and Vancouver Island, by a 1900-metre-long span. After this span the overhead line runs westward to Vancouver Island Terminal near the town of Duncan.

== History ==
In 1968 the first pole of the HVDC Vancouver Island link went into service. Its static inverters use mercury vapour rectifiers. Each of these rectifiers was 3.35 metres (11.0 feet) long, 1.22 metres (4.0 feet) wide and 6.10 metres (20.0 feet) high and has a weight of 4.5 metric tons. The valves are situated in a hall 26.21 metres (86.0 feet) long, 11.89 metres (39.0 feet) wide and 11.28 metres (37.0 feet) high. The maximum transmission capacity of this pole was 312 megawatts and the transmission voltage was 260 kV. The stations Vancouver Island Terminal and Arnott Substation were designed and delivered by Swedish company ASEA (later ABB). The Swedish team of some 10 people were headed for the first phase by Ivan Hedlund and for the second phase by Gunnar Ahgren.

In 1977 the HVDC Vancouver Island link was supplemented by installing a second pole. This pole used thyristor valves for its static inverters and operated at a voltage of 280kV with a rating of 370 megawatts. A new 230kV submarine cable for three-phase alternating current has been constructed between the Canadian mainland and Vancouver Island. This parallels the existing two HVDC lines and replaces one of two earlier 138kV lines. In the 2005 hearings for the new 230kV circuit the HVDC systems were reported to be at the end of their service life and are not considered to be reliable. As a result of this, the first pole was shut down in 2014 and the second in 2016.

== Electrodes and metallic return ==
HVDC Vancouver Island used metallic return, during monopolar operation, when current is lower than 600A. Otherwise earth return was used. On Vancouver Island the line for metallic return is a monopolar line on wooden poles, which are used in some sections also by AC lines, running parallel to the main line of HVDC Vancouver Island.

On the mainland, it uses the poles of the electrode line until a point at 49°3′39″N 123°2′34″W. After this point it runs on wooden poles together with a single-circuit three-phase AC line until 49°2′25″N 123°4′32″W. From there it runs as underground cable to Splashdown Park, where it transits at 49°1′58″N 123°5′26″W again into an overhead line, which ends at the terminal of the main line at 49°1′40″N 123°6′1″W.

The electrode on the Canadian Mainland is a land electrode situated at Boundary Bay at 49°03′25″N 123°01′46″W. It is connected with Arnott Substation by an overhead pole line with two conductors. The electrode on Vancouver Island is a shore electrode in a bay at Sansum Narrows at 48°46′22″N 123°34′24″W. It is connected with Vancouver Island Terminal by an overhead line with two conductors, which is installed on wooden poles. It runs between Vancouver Island Terminal and a point northwest of Maple Bay at 48°49′35″N 123°37′38″W parallel to other power lines.

== See also ==
- Jordan River Dam
- Juan de Fuca Cable Project
- List of HVDC Projects
- Power lines connecting Vancouver Island with Canadian Mainland
