= Juan de Fuca Cable Project =

Proposed power cable between the USA and Canada

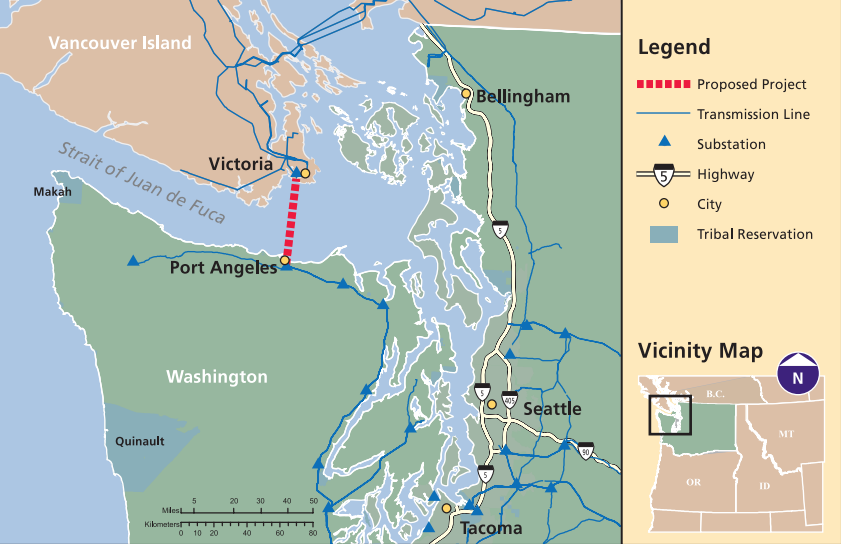
- Map of Juan de Fuca Cable Project

Location
- Country: Canada–United States
- State: Washington
- Province: British Columbia
- From: Victoria, British Columbia 48°29′26″N 123°27′30″W
- Passes through: Strait of Juan de Fuca
- To: Port Angeles, Washington 48°06′10″N 123°25′00″W

Ownership information
- Owner: Sea Breeze Pacific Juan de Fuca Cable LP
- Operator: BC Hydro/Bonneville Power Administration

Construction information
- Cable manufacturer: ABB "HVDC Light"
- Substation manufacturer: ABB
- Expected: 2020?

Technical information
- Type: Buried lines Submarine cables
- Current type: HVDC
- Total length: 22 mi (35 km)
- Capacity: 550 MW
- DC voltage: 150 kv
- No. of poles: 0

The Juan de Fuca Cable Project was a proposed 550 MW, 150 kV high-voltage direct current (HVDC) submarine power cable connection running 19 miles (31 km) under the Strait of Juan de Fuca between Port Angeles, Washington, and Victoria, British Columbia. The project's final environmental impact statement (required by United States law) was completed in October 2007, and a presidential permit issued in June 2008.

Sea Breeze Pacific Juan de Fuca Cable LP proposed to install a high voltage direct current electric power transmission line between Vancouver Island in Canada and Port Angeles on the Olympic Peninsula in the United States. This 550-megawatt transmission line would cross the international border beneath the Strait of Juan de Fuca, and would be constructed using a combination of underground and submarine cables.

A benefit of the interconnection would be to relieve congestion on the US–Canada interconnect. Under the Columbia River Treaty, in return for regulating the flow of the Columbia River in BC, the United States is obliged to return some of the additional electricity generated in Washington to BC.

Two converter stations would be built for connection to power grids in the United States and Canada. One would be at Port Angeles adjacent to an existing Bonneville Power Administration (BPA) substation. One would be at the Pike Lake substation near Victoria.

If built, it would have been the third HVDC system in the Pacific Northwest, along with the Pacific DC Intertie and HVDC Vancouver Island. The system would enable a more stable renewable energy supply by allowing bidirectional exchange of power based on renewable sources such as wind, hydro and solar, for which both supply and demand vary across wide areas based on seasonal and other factors. British Columbia's wind power is considered an underdeveloped resource.

As of late 2013, the project was waiting for completion of a $69 per megawatt hour power purchase agreement with BC Hydro, and would need recertification by Canadian energy regulators. At the same time, the provincial government was considering a plan from BC Hydro to supply energy at $83 per megawatt hour.

== See also ==
- HVDC Vancouver Island
- High-voltage direct current § Renewable electricity superhighways
- List of HVDC projects
