= Skirt Mountain =

Mountain in British Columbia, Canada

Coordinates: 48°27′54″N 123°31′57″W

Skirt Mountain is a 347 m (1,138 ft) mountain lying approximately 13 km (8 mi) northwest of Victoria, British Columbia in Highland Land District. It is a part of the Gowlland Range (part of the Vancouver Island Ranges), which extends from the Highlands through Langford to Metchosin. The indigenous name for the traditional mountain area in shared Coast Salish territories is SPAET ("spa - eth"), which means bear in the Salishan language. The mountain is a popular destination for hikers and mountain-bikers, and is also the site of the controversial Bear Mountain, a golf resort and condominium development.
