= Bear Mountain (resort) =

Golf resort and community in British Columbia, Canada

Coordinates: 48°28′01″N 123°31′35″W

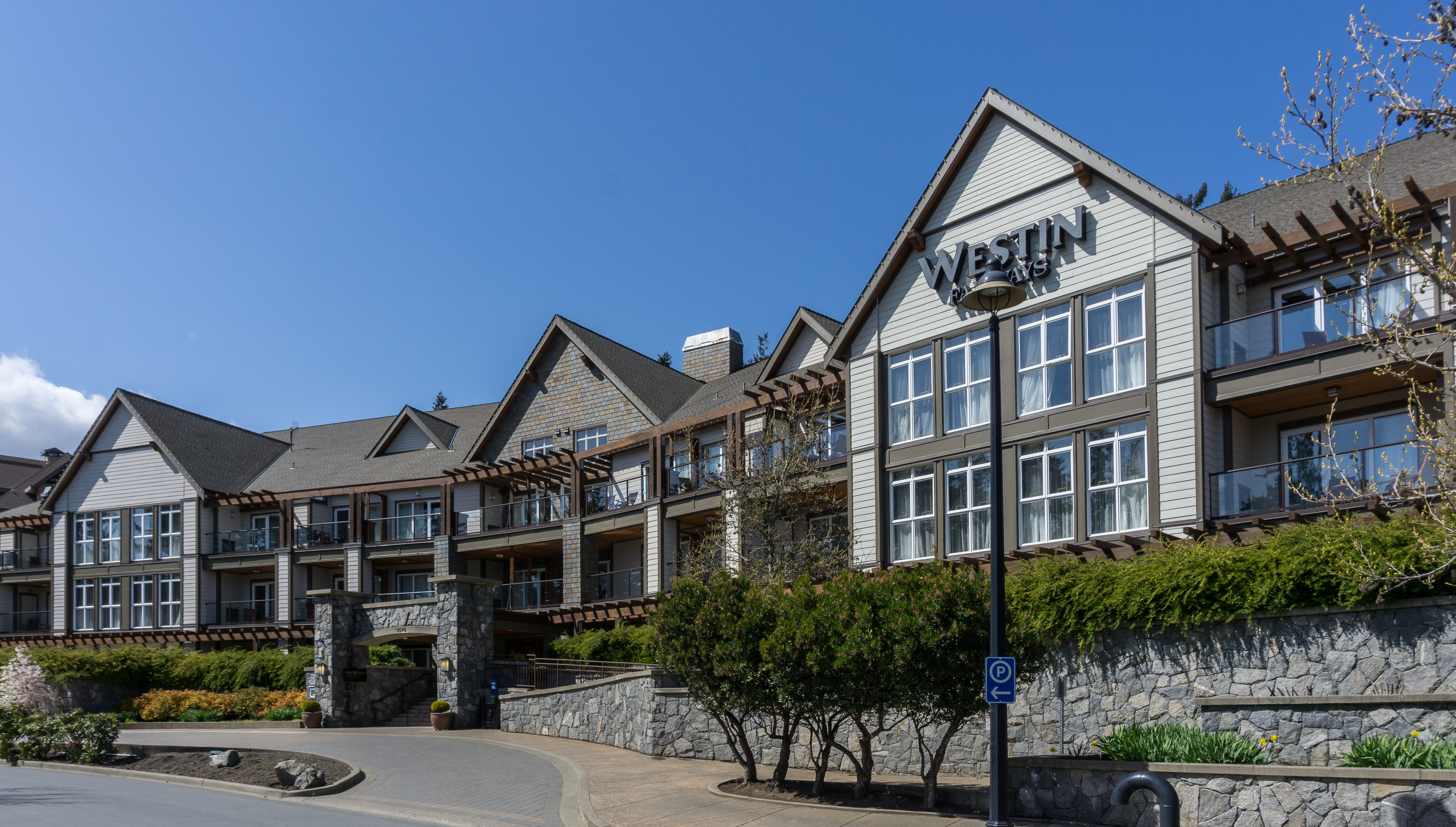
One of the hotels at the Bear Mountain Resort

Bear Mountain is a golf resort and adjacent community straddling the boundary between the City of Langford and the District of Highlands, in the Western Communities of Greater Victoria, British Columbia, Canada. It is located on and adjacent to Skirt Mountain.

Located on southern Vancouver Island, Bear Mountain Golf Resort and Spa offers two courses for a combined 36-hole design by Jack Nicklaus. The Mountain Course, a par 70 playing at 6,900 yards, sets atop a 1,100-foot mountain and has been assigned a slope rating of 142 from the back tees. The 18-hole, par 71 Nicklaus Design Valley Course measures just under 7,000 yards. Bear Mountain is also home to the Canadian training center of Golf Canada's National Development team, the high performance training centre of Canada's National Mountain Bike team, and Canada's largest indoor/outdoor clay court tennis facility supported by Tennis Canada and Tennis BC. Plans are also in the works for a professional disc golf course.

The existing community alongside the resort contains approximately 1,150 homes with 3,000 people, and at build-out over 4,000 homes and the community could exceed 10,000 residents, and has been zoned for 645,000 square feet of commercial space.

Bear Mountain was purchased by B.C.-based Ecoasis Developments LLP. in 2013.

== See also ==
- List of golf courses in British Columbia
