= Power lines connecting Vancouver Island with Canadian Mainland =

The power grid of Vancouver Island is owned and operated by BC Hydro, and is connected with that of the Mainland of British Columbia by high voltage AC submarine cables, and formerly by a DC submarine cable system.

These links, which all consist of overhead line sections on land together with submarine cables are:

- Two parallel 500 kV AC circuits from south of Powell River to Vancouver Island in two cable and three overhead sections with reactor station on Texada Island, running from Malaspina substation near Sechelt to Dunsmuir substation near Qualicum Beach;
- Two AC lines, one 138 kV and one 230 kV, running from Arnott substation in Delta to Vancouver Island Terminal in North Cowichan (the same points that HVDC Vancouver Island connects). Waypoints of these southern lines, which all consist of three overhead and two submarine cable sections are:

The former * HVDC Vancouver Island was capable of transferring a total of 700 MW (now obsolete and de-energized).

Point	Coordinates
Arnott Substation	49.091944°N 123.041944°W
Boundary Bluff Cable Terminal	49.0077277°N 123.0890179°W
Galiano Island Cable Terminal	48.9054008°N 123.3616376°W
Parker Island Cable Terminal	48.89291°N 123.4256136°W
Salt Spring Island Cable Terminal	48.8632961°N 123.4525484°W
Samsum Narrows Span, East End	48.8277957°N 123.5668266°W
Samsum Narrows Span, West End	48.8266797°N 123.5908163°W
Vancouver Island Terminal	48.8275°N 123.715278°W

- A 500 kV AC link consisting of two parallel lines running to the midpoint of Vancouver Island.

Point	Coordinates
Malaspina Substation	49.6690166°N 123.9602852°W
Sackinaw Lake Span, South End	49.6705997°N 124.0210533°W
Sackinaw Lake Span, North End	49.6775427°N 124.0251303°W
Agamemnon Channel Span, East End	49.6911898°N 124.0623808°W
Agamemnon Channel Span, West End	49.6921892°N 124.0851903°W
Cape Cockburn Cable Terminal	49.6741339°N 124.2035777°W
Texada Island Cable Terminal East	49.6301301°N 124.2842746°W
Texada Island, Reactor Station	49.6158403°N 124.3308699°W
Texada Island Cable Terminal West	49.5903014°N 124.3582285°W
Nile Creek Cable Terminal	49.4217569°N 124.6431756°W
Dunsmuir Substation	49.3934351°N 124.6708775°W

== See also ==
- List of high voltage underground and submarine cables
- HVDC Vancouver Island
