= Sooke Flowline =

Aqueduct in British Columbia, Canada

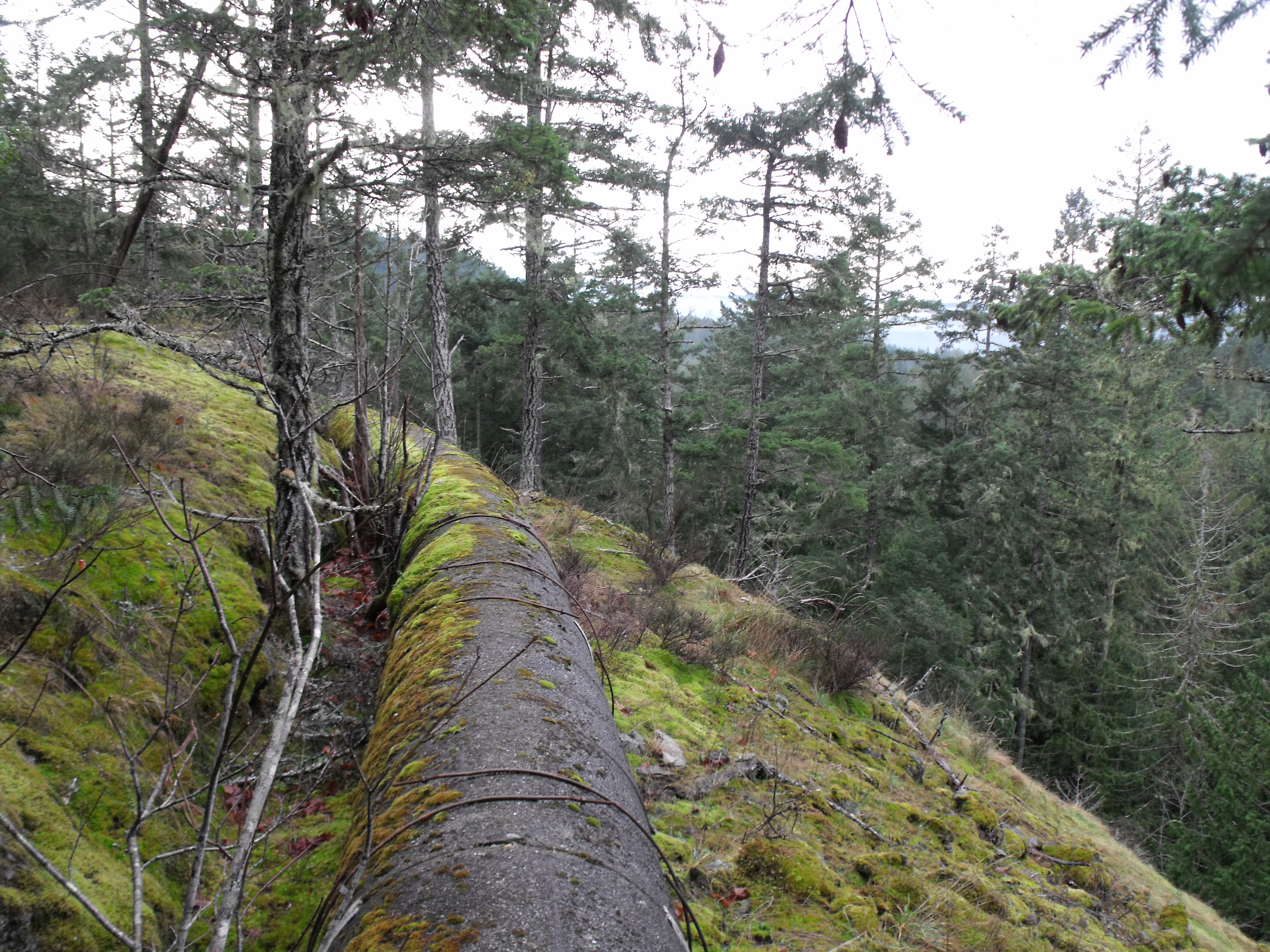
- A section of the Sooke Flowline
- Begins: Sooke Lake Reservoir
- Ends: Humpback Lake, Sooke Hills Regional Park Reserve
- Official name: Sooke Flowline/Aqueduct
- Owner: CRD Water District

Characteristics
- Total length: 44 km (27 mi)
- Diameter: 1.07 m (3 ft 6 in)

History
- Construction start: 1913
- Opened: 1915-1970 (East section); 1915-2009 (North Section)

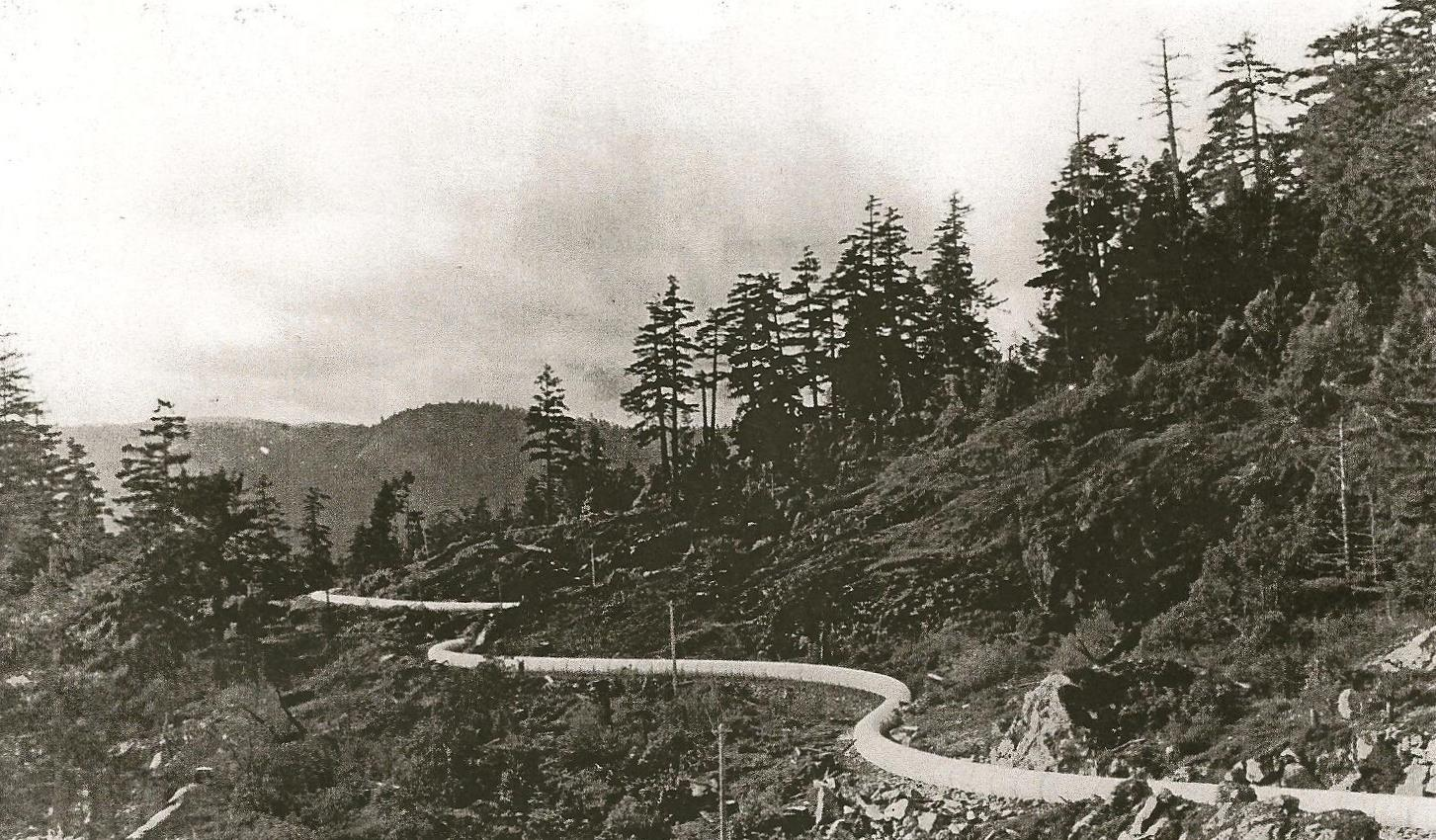
A picture taken just after construction of the pipe Credit: Sooke Region Historical Society.

The Sooke Flowline is an abandoned 44-kilometre (27 mi) concrete aqueduct that snakes through the Sooke Hills from Sooke Lake to the Humpback Reservoir, near Mount Wells Regional Park, in British Columbia, Canada. From this reservoir, a buried, riveted steel pressure main transported water to Victoria. Between 1994 and 2007, this main was replaced, since it was long past its useful life. The flowline was vital to the continued growth of the city of Victoria, as it provided a reliable water supply. While the flowline remains, Victoria's water supply is now carried via Kapoor Tunnel. Leigh Hodgetts, CRD Waterworks superintendent, reported that the westernmost section of the flowline is still used to carry Sooke's water supply, via a 16-inch interconnecting pipe feeding the Sooke distribution system from Charters Creek to Sooke River Road.

Elk Lake used to be the water supply for Victoria, and when the Colquitz River was dammed, it flooded the swamp and merged Elk and Beaver lakes. In the early 1900s, it was determined that Elk/Beaver Lake could no longer meet Victoria's water needs. The daily draw from the lake was too great, and despite measures taken to extend its useful life, such as filter ponds, the pressure and supply was too low, and sediment and amphibians were getting drawn out through the lake's intake.

== Construction ==
In 1912, the city of Victoria expropriated forty property owners on Sooke Lake and on the proposed flowline right-of-way (ROW), at significant cost. The city hired the Pacific Lock Joint Pipe Company to cast the pipe segments, and using their patented design, constructed the pipeline. In between 1911 and 1915, this major engineering project employed over 400 workers and housed their families in rural Sooke. The pipe is almost completely at a constant elevation. Although figures vary, the slope from Sooke Lake to Humpback is between 0.0947% and 0.119% when the inverted siphons are excluded.

At the factory located at Coopers Cove, the site of today's Stickleback Bar and Grill, round concrete segments, 36,000 in all, were mass-produced. The engineering firm Sanderson and Porter specified 40-inch pipe, but the company already had 42-inch molds made up, so they decided to use them instead. The factory was very efficient and used steam to accelerate the curing of the concrete segments. In one eight-hour shift, 150–160 segments were produced. The segments were winched up the hill 450 feet (137 m) above the construction site. Three small locomotives were used to bring segments to both ends via a temporary 2 ft (610 mm) gauge railway, and the pipe was constructed from the ends to the midpoint. At the ends, tripod derricks would unload the segments and place them on the crushed railbed while the tracks were removed. All trees on the 100 ft (30.5 m) right-of-way were cleared so that they could not fall and crush the pipe.

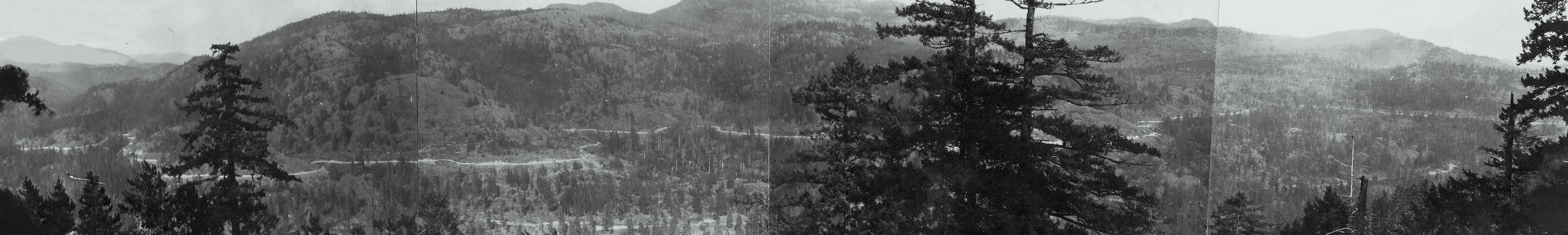
Panorama of the Sooke Flowline looking east above the Sooke River near today's Sooke Potholes Regional Park

== Maintenance ==
During the flowline's operation, caretakers lived along the route in small cabins. They rode recumbent tricycles on the pipe with tilted rear wheels to stay on top. During their routes, they were on the lookout for cracks in the pipe, leaky joints, and trespassers.

Every 600 metres (660 yards) or so, there are access hatches meant for periodic maintenance from the inside by workers. A man would lie prone on a cart and scrape moss off the inside of the pipe and clear sediments, rocks, and dead fish, which inevitably backed up in places. Installed on top of these hatches were wire mesh domes, which reduced pressure buildup and helped aerate the water.

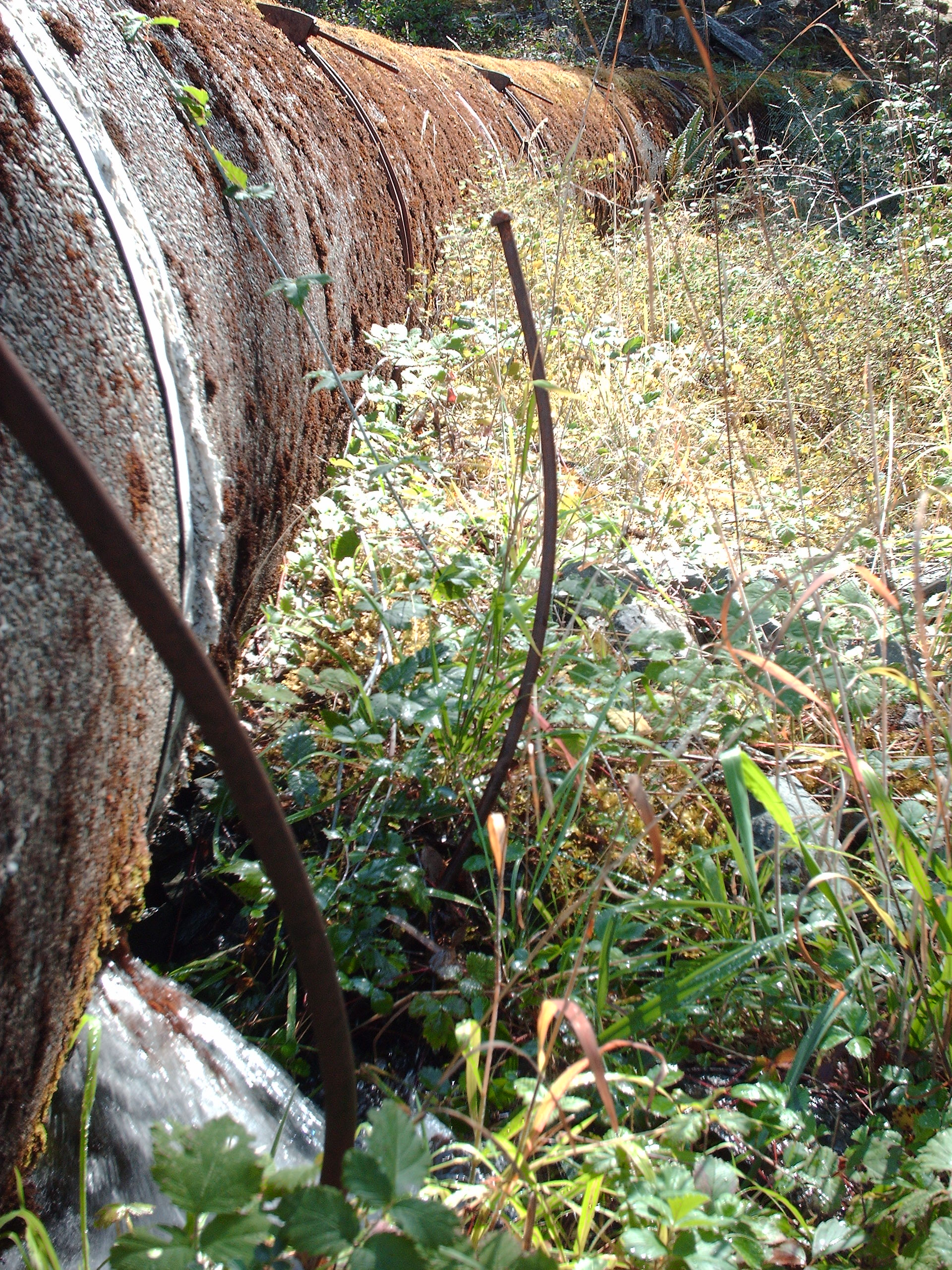
Evidence of leaking on the pipe and broken iron bands demonstrate why decommissioning was necessary.

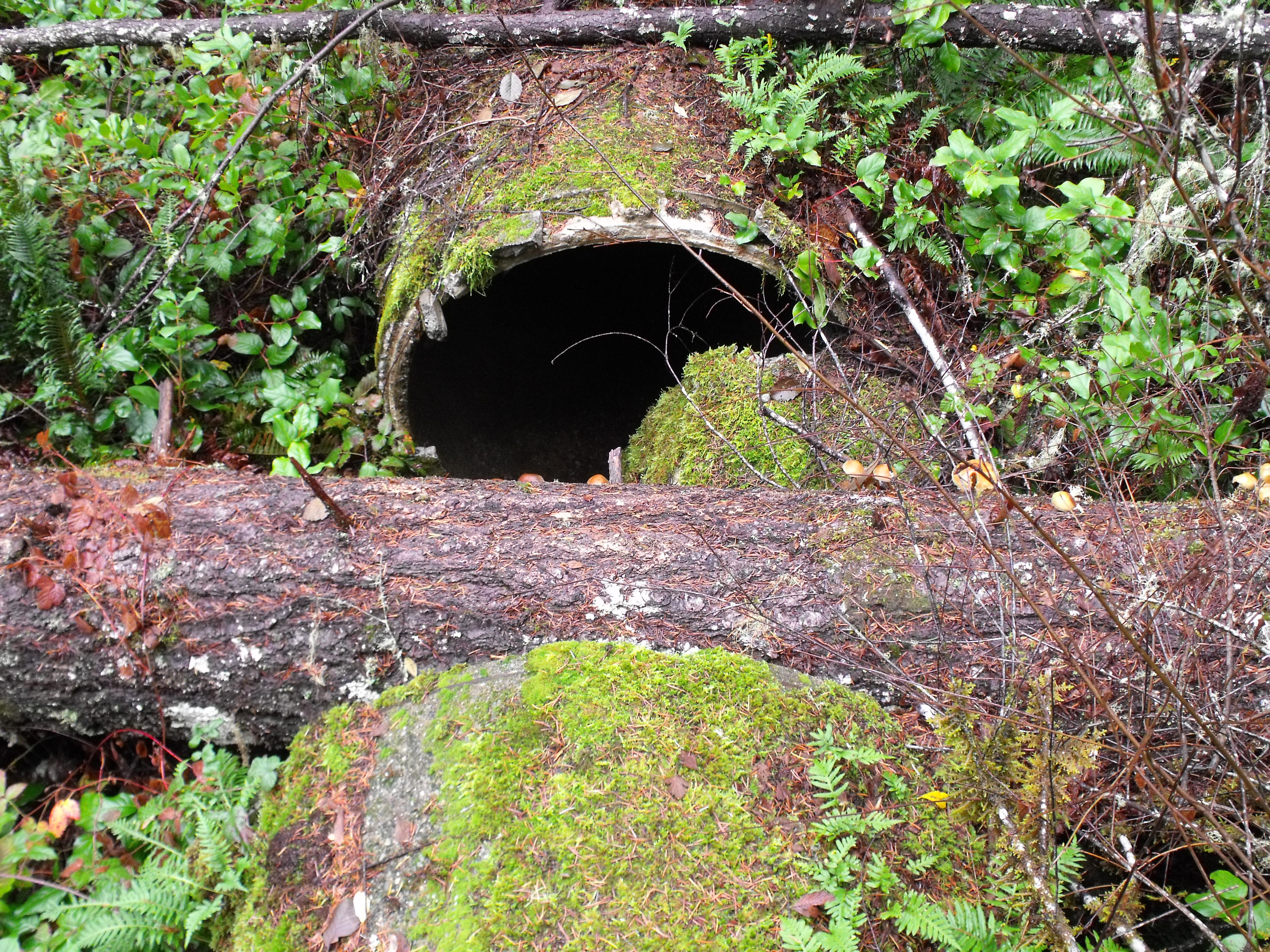
Another example demonstrating the vulnerability of the pipe

== Decommissioning ==
The flowline was never highly efficient. When the taps were opened in 1915, the water that came through was of high quality, but it was soon discovered that it experienced 50–75% water loss throughout its length, depending on the season and temperature. During summer however, the leaking was slightly reduced. This needed to be remedied by placing strips of material across the joints and fastening them with iron bands. A further challenge occurred in the winter of 1915–16. Parts of the newly constructed pipe got taken out by landslides, and repair was difficult, since the construction railway no longer existed. When the city began to outgrow demand, the pipe section from Sooke to the Humpback Reservoir was decommissioned, in 1970. The pipe had begun to show its age, with many leaks and damage from falling trees and rocks. It was then replaced with the 8.8 km (5.5 mi) Kapoor Tunnel, bored through solid rock to the Japan Gulch Disinfection Plant, near Goldstream Provincial Park.

== Sooke use ==
The portion of the old pipe from Sooke Lake to Sooke remained in service after the Humpback Reservoir section was decommissioned. It was routinely patrolled to make sure marijuana grow ops weren't tapping into the pipe and to do periodic patching up as best as possible, but it still had many leaks. Damage had also resulted from falling rocks and trees, and there were concerns about its ability to survive a major earthquake. Finally in late 2009, it was replaced with a PVC pipe buried under the Galloping Goose Regional Trail. This connects to the Sooke River Road Disinfection Facility, which went online in 2009. The facility incorporates ultraviolet disinfection, followed by the addition of chlorine and ammonia.

The water department of the Capital Regional District still owns pipe and the approximately 100 ft (30.5 m) wide corridor, which includes large trees, cliffs, and mossy bluffs.

== Materials ==
There are 54 trestles along the 44 km (27 mi) length of various sizes, spanning ravines. During construction, temporary timber trestles were built alongside the proposed trestles to avoid delays and speed up the building of permanent concrete trestles.

The largest part of the pipeline consists of reinforced concrete segments, which are four by four feet (1.22 by 1.22 m).

Six concrete trestles are made out of wood staves preserved with creosote and bound with iron bands. These were built to reduce the length around the longest of ravines. The wooden trestles dip down one side of the ravine and go up the other, relying on the downward pressure to push the water back up. These "dipping" trestles, known as "inverted siphons", were initially constructed of concrete as well, but the material is very weak in tension and resulted in cracked segments due to the pressure of 39.017 psi (269.01 kPa) (abs).

== Protection ==
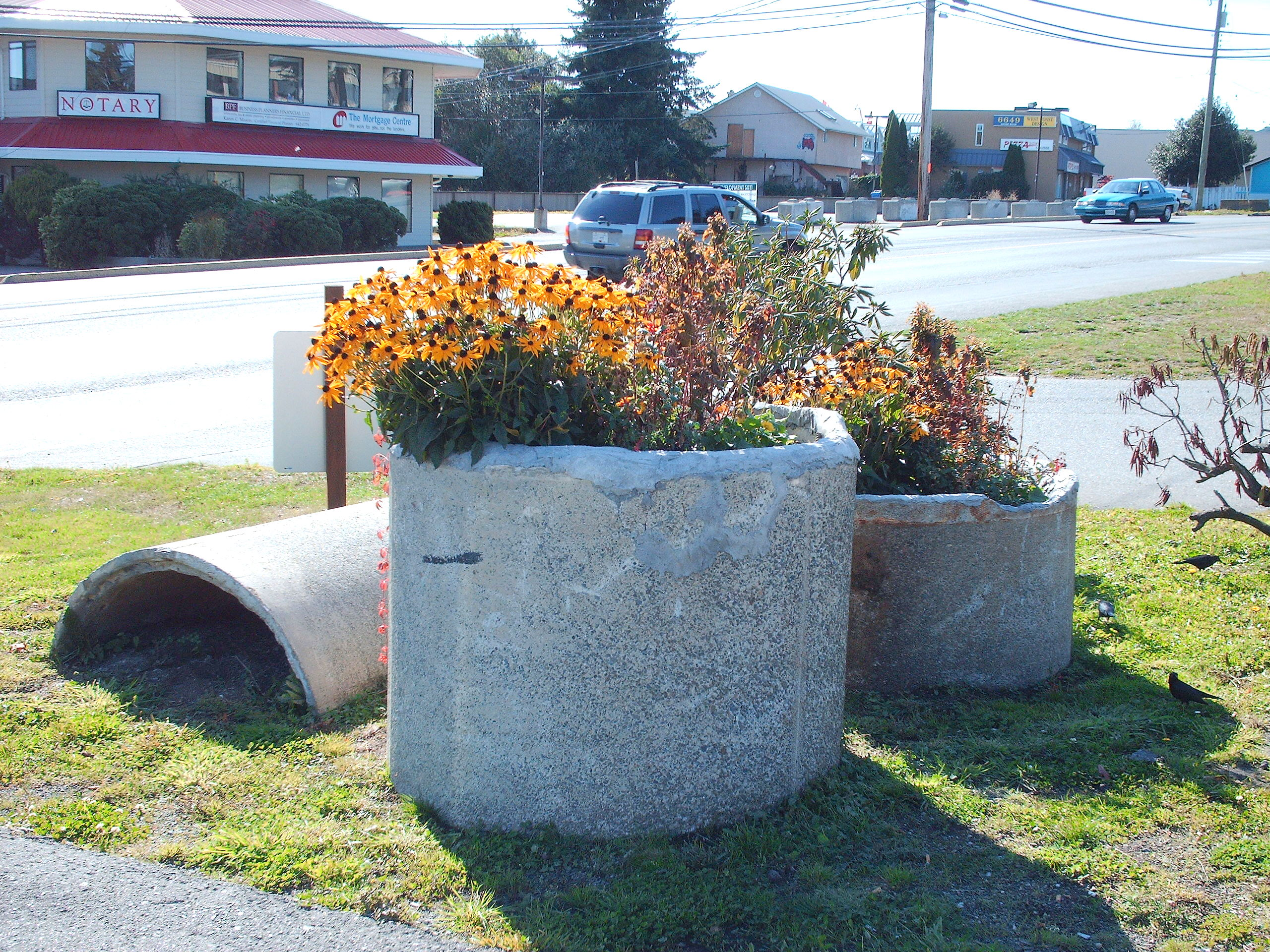
An example of how surplus sections of pipe were used through the township of Sooke

=== Sooke Region Museum ===
As a pilot project of the Sooke Region Museum, surplus sections of pipe were laid out at multiple locations around the Sooke townsite, accompanied by interpretive signs and historical photographs. One issue that had to be addressed was the presence of asbestos on the pipe, originally used in the mortar to join pipe segments together.

These segments can be found at the following locations:

- Sooke Region Museum grounds on Phillips Road
- In front of Home Hardware on Sooke Road
- Holy Trinity Church on Murray Road
- Sooke Municipal Hall on Otter Point Road

=== Utility box beautification ===
As part of a beautification project around the CRD, plain electrical boxes were outfitted with decorative images of the pipe trestles. Such examples are at the following locations:

- Helmcken Road and Watkiss Way in View Royal
- Veteran's Memorial Parkway at the E&N crossing in Langford
- Lansdowne and Foul Bay Roads in Oak Bay
- Bay and Pleasant Street in Victoria

== Visiting ==
The pipe can be found and accessed at the following locations:

- 48°26.821′N 123°33.293′W – Mt. Wells Regional Park – the pipe terminus is at the Humpback Reservoir (Mt. Wells parking lot), and it twins Humpback Road to Sooke Highway.
- 48°24.836′N 123°35.138′W – parking is located by some mailboxes 300 metres (330 yards) south of indicated location.
- 48°23.991′N 123°38.184′W – Glinz Lake Road – drive up the road and park just before the Camp Thunderbird main gate. The pipe crosses the road approximately 50 metres (55 yards) south of the gate.
- 48°23.835′N 123°36.256′W – Impala Road – this steep road is best if it's walked up; there is no room to park up the road.
- 48°24.251′N 123°39.996′W – Harbourview Road – there is a CRD parking lot at the end. Continue walking up the road for 15 minutes, where you will see the pipe cross.
- 48°26.374′N 123°42.976′W – Sooke Potholes – the pipe runs north–south to the east of Sooke River.

== See also ==
- Lubbe Powerhouse
