= Goldstream Provincial Park =

Provincial park in British Columbia, Canada

- IUCN category II (national park)
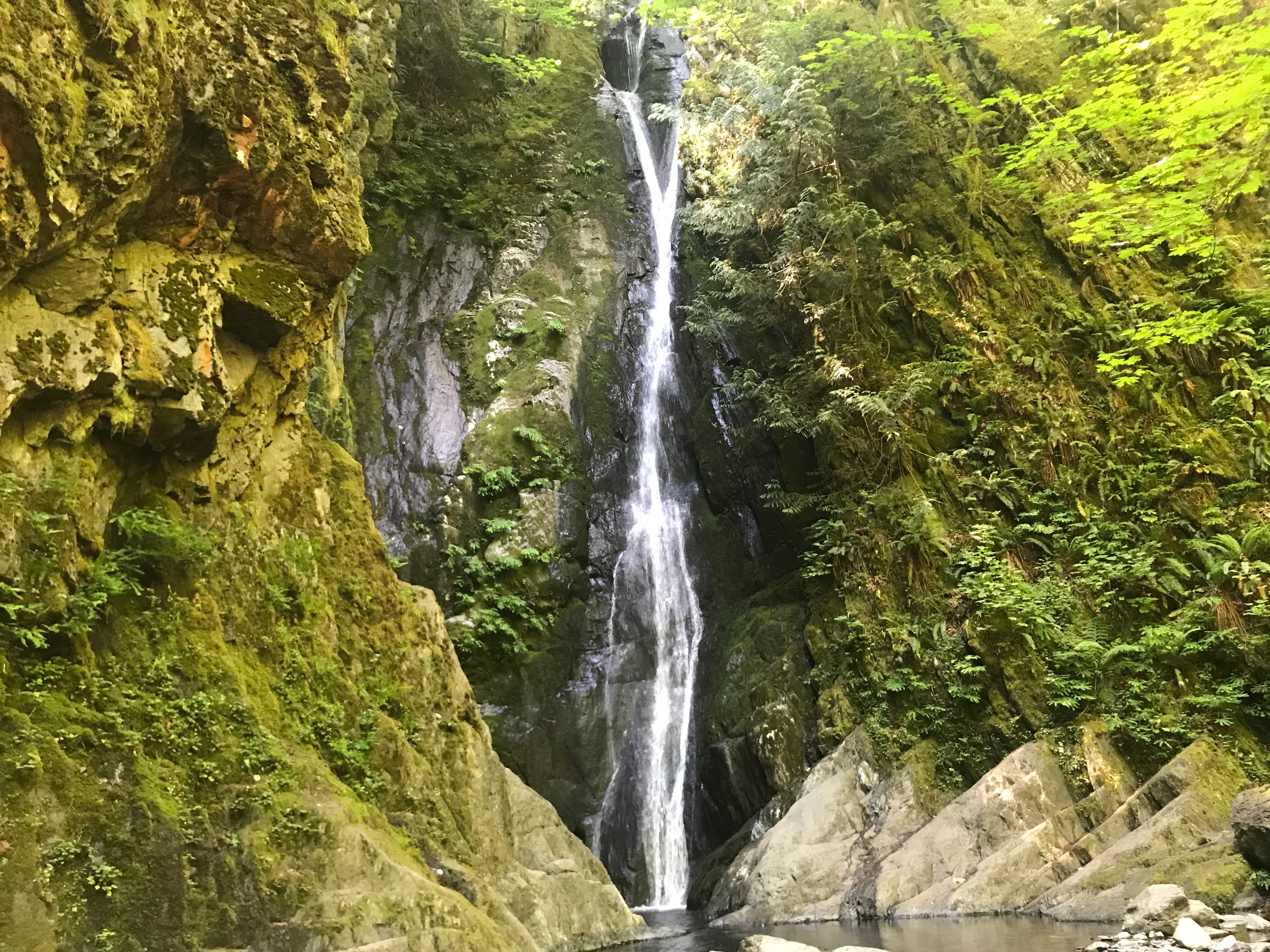
- Niagara Falls in Goldstream Provincial Park

- Location within Vancouver Island Location within British Columbia Location within Capital Regional District
- Interactive map of Goldstream Provincial Park
- Location: Langford, British Columbia, Canada
- Coordinates: 48°28′00″N 123°33′00″W
- Area: 477 ha (1,180 acres)
- Designation: Provincial Park
- Established: 26 June 1958
- Visitors: 692,338 (in 2017-18)
- Governing body: BC Parks

Goldstream Provincial Park is a provincial park in British Columbia, Canada. It is known for the annual fall salmon runs in the Goldstream River, and the large numbers of bald eagles that congregate to feed at that time. The total size of the park is 3.79 km^{2} (937 acres). It is located in the city of Langford. Recreational fishing is only accessible to indigenous cultures, and not local non-indigenous residents.

Huge trees stand on the Goldstream River floodplain. Among them are Douglas-fir and western red cedar. They tower over substantial specimens of western hemlock, black cottonwood, bigleaf maple and red alder, which in turn shade western yew. Steep ridges—home to arbutus, western flowering dogwood and lodgepole pine—overlook the floodplain. Many wildflowers are seen during spring and summer.

Goldstream Park has several hiking trails, one of which offers access to Mount Finlayson.

== Goldstream Nature House ==
Goldstream Nature House is a nature centre located in the park and operated by RLC Enterprize. The centre features natural history displays and offers seasonal environmental education programs for school groups and the general public.

== Goldstream Trestle ==
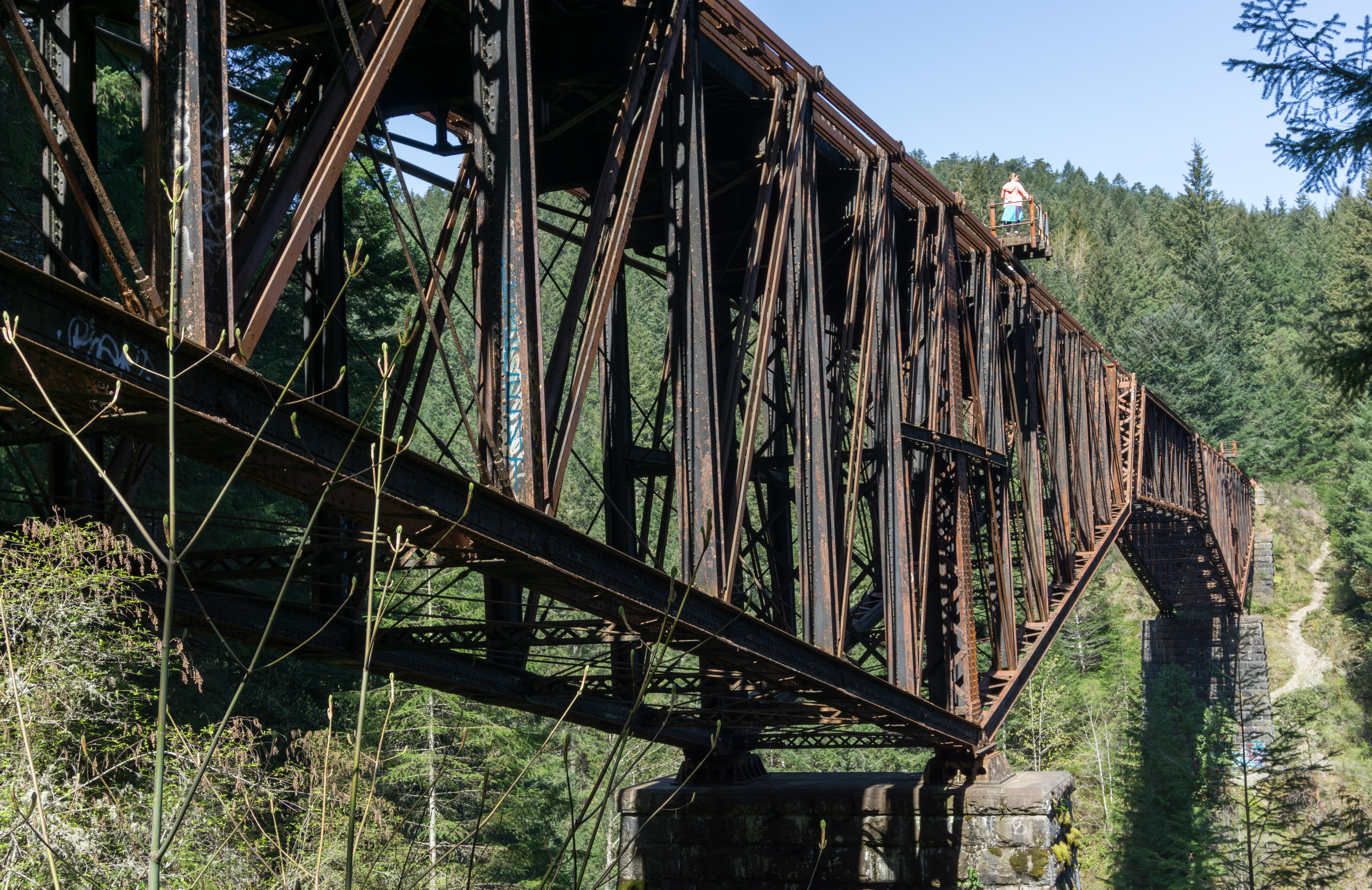
Railway trestle at Goldstream

There is a railway bridge, known locally as Goldstream Trestle (also Niagara Trestle or Niagara Creek Trestle) but officially as Niagara Canyon Bridge by the railway, that borders the park on the west side of the highway. The trestle is clearly indicated on the park map past the westernmost tip of the 'Gold Mine Trail'.

From the route there are views of Mount Finlayson to the east; however, the bridge itself is part of the Island Rail Corridor, a dormant rail line. While the trestle is noted on the map, it is not considered a part of the park's official trail system. The Goldstream Trestle is private property; the railway and its structures (bridges and tunnels) are closed by the public.

Until 2021, the Goldstream Trestle was a popular attraction in the Greater Victoria area for those looking to enjoy the captivating scenery and refreshing scents of nature. After multiple suicides in the area, permanent barriers were installed on either sides of the trestle to restrict access.

== Gold Rush ==
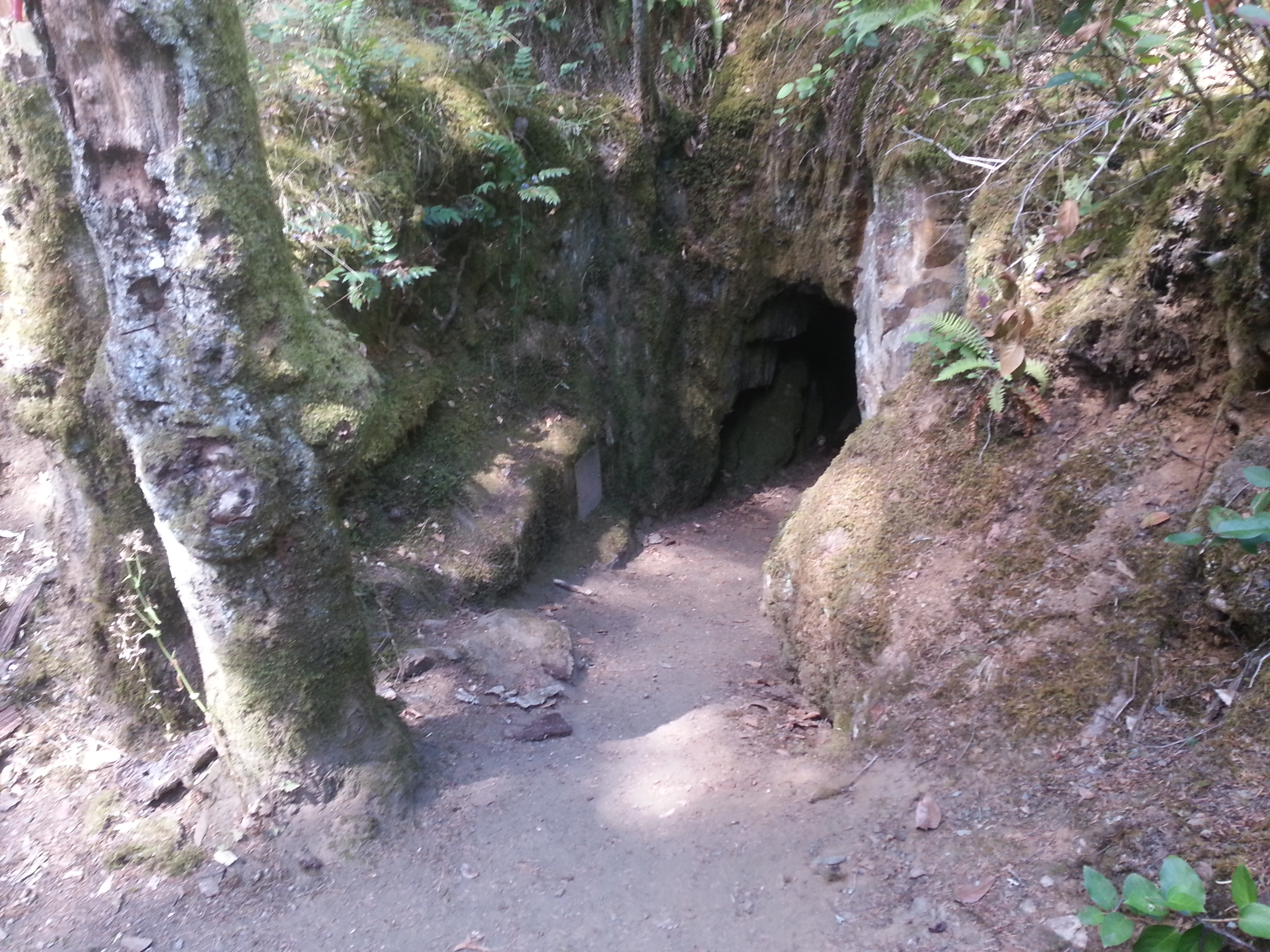
Entrance to mine

In 1863, rumours of gold in Goldstream drove a short, but intense, gold rush in the region. The remnants of the gold rush can be seen in the abandoned mine entrances located along the park's hiking trails.

== History ==
Based on information in records in the City of Victoria Archives (solicitor's files), Goldstream Park was created due to the foresight of Victoria's Mayor and City Council of 1925.

Goldstream Park comprises Sections 6 and 7, Goldstream District, includes the salt marsh and the lower reaches of the Goldstream River, and protects some of the largest Western Red Cedars (Thuja plicata) in British Columbia. Lot 6 originally belonged to Langford's earliest settler, James Phair. He operated the original Goldstream Hotel, now a pub in competition with Six Mile for "oldest pub in BC". In 1908 he sold section 6 to the Esquimalt Water Works Company, a private firm supplying water to the City of Victoria. Section 7, the upstream half of the Park, was originally a Crown Grant to the National Electric Tramway and Lighting Company Ltd. (319 acres for $319) and was acquired from them by the Esquimalt Water Works Company. Financed by a mortgage held by the Dunsmuir Estate of Hatley Castle fame, they acquired the entire Goldstream watershed in order to have a monopoly on the water rights. This was intended to protect them from other corporations' applying for water rights, particularly the City of Victoria under 1873 legislation covering its water supply.

In order to retire the mortgage, the Company sold some of the watershed's timber to the Continental Timber Company (Fairservice Guerin) in 1925, for about $150,000. Within the same year, however, the Esquimalt Water Works Company Winding up Act had been passed by the city, expropriating the land and water works. Victoria re-negotiated the logging contract in order to remove the Goldstream Park area from that destined for logging.

In 1926, the Goldstream Gardens Company submitted a proposal under which they would lease Sections 6 & 7 for 49 years and develop it as a commercial park. It was to have included "motor camp" accommodations, tea rooms, miniature golf course, Swiss Village, riding stables and equipment, gas stations, flower gardens, and fernery. The proposal was not approved, although a confectionary and a tearoom operated in the Park at different times in the 1930s and 1940s. In 1946, Council granted permission to the Rod and Gun Club for the construction of a Clubhouse which today is used as the Nature House.

The City approached the Provincial Government to take over the responsibility for the park and it became a Provincial Park in 1958, the year of the Province's Centennial.

== See also ==
- Goldstream River
- Goldstream, British Columbia
- Leechtown, British Columbia
- Sooke Flowline
- Hatley Park National Historic Site
