= Rowing at the 1972 Summer Olympics – Men's coxed pair =

Men's coxed pair at the Games of the XX Olympiad
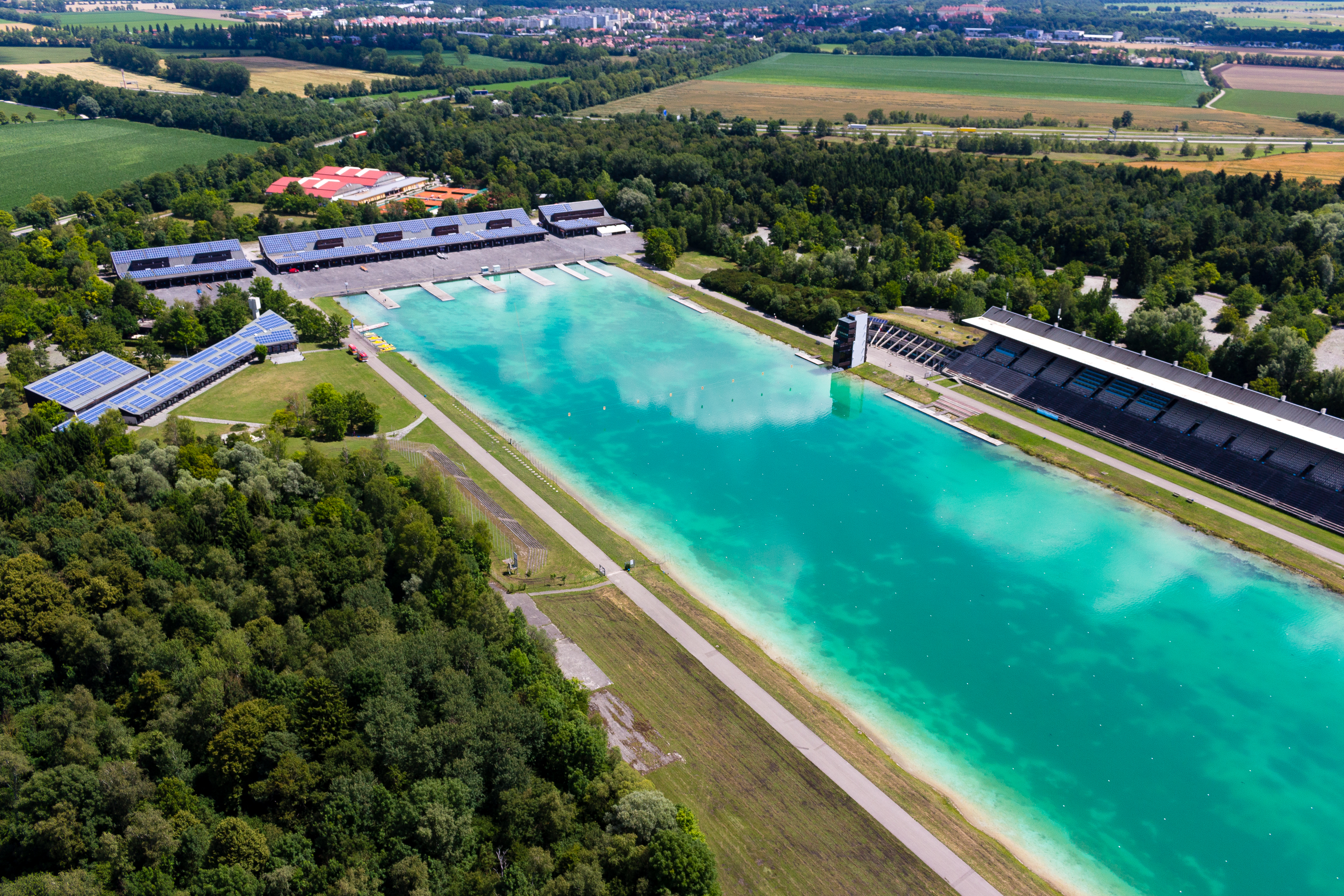
- Aerial view of the venue in Oberschleißheim
- Venue: Oberschleißheim Regatta Course
- Dates: 27 August – 2 September 1972
- Competitors: 63 from 21 nations
- Winning time: 7:17.25

Medalists
1st place, gold medalist(s)		Wolfgang Gunkel; Jörg Lucke; Klaus-Dieter Neubert (cox); East Germany
2nd place, silver medalist(s)		Oldřich Svojanovský; Pavel Svojanovský; Vladimír Petříček (cox); Czechoslovakia
3rd place, bronze medalist(s)		Ștefan Tudor; Petre Ceapura; Ladislau Lovrenschi (cox); Romania

The men's coxed pair competition at the 1972 Summer Olympics in Munich took place from 27 August to 2 September at the Olympic Regatta Course in Oberschleißheim. There were 21 boats (63 competitors) from 21 nations, with each nation limited to a single boat in the event. The event was won by East German crew Wolfgang Gunkel, Jörg Lucke, and coxswain Klaus-Dieter Neubert; it was the first medal in the event for East Germany as a separate nation. Czechoslovakia (silver) and Romania (bronze) also won their first medals in the men's coxed pair.

== Background ==
This was the 13th appearance of the event. Rowing had been on the programme in 1896 but was cancelled due to bad weather. The men's coxed pair was one of the original four events in 1900, but was not held in 1904, 1908, or 1912. It returned to the programme after World War I and was held every Games from 1924 to 1992, when it (along with the men's coxed four) was replaced with the men's lightweight double sculls and men's lightweight coxless four.

Two of the 18 competitors from the 1968 coxed pair Final A returned: rower Wolfgang Gunkel and coxswain Klaus-Dieter Neubert from the fourth-place East German boat. They, along with new second rower Jörg Lucke (a 1968 coxless pairs Olympic champion), had won the 1971 European championship and were among the favorites. Another top team was the Czechoslovak boat, brothers Oldřich Svojanovský and Pavel Svojanovský and cox Vladimír Petříček; they had won the 1969 European title. The Romanian crew, Ștefan Tudor, Petre Ceapura, and cox Ladislau Lovrenschi, were the reigning (1970) World Champions.

Canada and Norway each made their debut in the event. France and the United States each made their 11th appearance, tied for most among nations to that point.

== Competition format ==
The coxed pair event featured three-person boats, with two rowers and a coxswain. It was a sweep rowing event, with the rowers each having one oar (and thus each rowing on one side). The course used the 2000 metres distance that became the Olympic standard in 1912. This rowing competition consisted of three main rounds (quarterfinals, semifinals, and finals), as well as a repechage round that allowed teams that did not win their quarterfinal heats to advance to the semifinals.

- Heats: Four heats. With 21 boats entered, there were 5 or 6 boats per heat. The top boat in each heat (total of 4 boats) advanced directly to the semifinals; all other boats (17 boats) went to the repechage.
- Repechage: Four heats. There were 4 or 5 boats in each heat. The top two boats in each heat (total of 8 boats) advanced to the semifinals. The remaining boats (9 boats) were eliminated.
- Semifinals: Two heats. Each heat consisted of 6 boats. The top three boats in each heat advanced to the "A" final; the other three boats in each heat were sent to a "B" final (7th–12th place classification race).
- Finals: A main final (Final A) and a 7th–12th place classification race (Final B).

== Schedule ==
All times are Central European Time (UTC+1)

Date	Time	Round
Sunday, 27 August 1972	14:00	Quarterfinals
Tuesday, 29 August 1972	14:00	Repechage
Thursday, 31 August 1972	11:30	Semifinals
Friday, 1 September 1972	10:00	Final B
Saturday, 2 September 1972	11:30	Final A

== Results ==
=== Quarterfinals ===
The top crew in each heat advanced to the semifinals, with all others sent to the repechages.

==== Quarterfinal 1 ====
Rank	Rowers	Coxswain	Nation	Time	Notes
1	Oldřich Svojanovský; Pavel Svojanovský	Vladimír Petříček	Czechoslovakia	7:41.27	Q
2	René Furler; Nicolas Lindecker	Stefan Hablützel	Switzerland	7:46.03	R
3	Ștefan Tudor; Petre Ceapura	Ladislau Lovrenschi	Romania	7:47.98	R
4	Mike Neary; Trevor Josephson	Robert Battersby	Canada	7:49.54	R
5	Rolf Andreassen; Arne Bergodd	Thor Egil Olsen	Norway	8:00.56	R
6	Paul De Weert; Wilfried Van Herck	Guy Defraigne	Belgium	8:08.51	R

==== Quarterfinal 2 ====
Rank	Rowers	Coxswain	Nation	Time	Notes
1	Mike Staines; Luther Jones	Aaron Herman	United States	7:50.00	Q
2	Wojciech Repsz; Wiesław Długosz	Jacek Rylski	Poland	7:57.23	R
3	Bernard Luttikhuizen; René Kieft	Herman Zaanen	Netherlands	8:00.15	R
4	Rainer Hinteregger; Manfred Grieshofer	Werner Grieshofer	Austria	8:08.88	R
5	Pedro Ciapessoni; Jorge Buenahora	Daniel Jorge	Uruguay	8:29.51	R

==== Quarterfinal 3 ====
Rank	Rowers	Coxswain	Nation	Time	Notes
1	Wolfgang Gunkel; Jörg Lucke	Klaus-Dieter Neubert	East Germany	7:54.11	Q
2	Dimitar Valov; Dimitar Yanakiev	Nenko Dobrev	Bulgaria	8:01.01	R
3	Giampaolo Tronchin; Mario Semenzato	Siro Meli	Italy	8:02.79	R
4	Jean-Claude Coucardon; Christian Durniak	Alain Lacoste	France	8:09.62	R
5	Pedro Yucciolino; Rafael Garba	Raúl Mazerati	Argentina	8:20.19	R

==== Quarterfinal 4 ====
Rank	Rowers	Coxswain	Nation	Time	Notes
1	Vladimir Eshinov; Nikolay Ivanov	Yuriy Lorentsson	Soviet Union	7:43.84	Q
2	David Maxwell; Mike Hart	Alan Inns	Great Britain	7:49.56	R
3	Heinz Mußmann; Bernd Krause	Stefan Kuhnke	West Germany	8:02.19	R
4	Leo Ahonen; Leif Andersson	Antero Yli-Ikkelä	Finland	8:06.56	R
5	Lázaro Rivero; Teófilo López	Jesús Rosello	Cuba	8:17.34	R

=== Repechages ===
Top two finishers in each heat advanced to semi-finals.

==== Repechage heat 1 ====
Rank	Rowers	Coxswain	Nation	Time	Notes
1	David Maxwell; Mike Hart	Alan Inns	Great Britain	8:01.14	Q
2	Rolf Andreassen; Arne Bergodd	Thor Egil Olsen	Norway	8:03.50	Q
3	Giampaolo Tronchin; Mario Semenzato	Siro Meli	Italy	8:10.46	
4	Rainer Hinteregger; Manfred Grieshofer	Werner Grieshofer	Austria	8:15.94	

==== Repechage heat 2 ====
Rank	Rowers	Coxswain	Nation	Time	Notes
1	Dimitar Valov; Dimitar Yanakiev	Nenko Dobrev	Bulgaria	8:10.94	Q
2	Mike Neary; Trevor Josephson	Robert Battersby	Canada	8:12.69	Q
3	Bernard Luttikhuizen; René Kieft	Herman Zaanen	Netherlands	8:17.37	
4	Lázaro Rivero; Teófilo López	Jesús Rosello	Cuba	8:37.14	

==== Repechage heat 3 ====
Rank	Rowers	Coxswain	Nation	Time	Notes
1	Ștefan Tudor; Petre Ceapura	Ladislau Lovrenschi	Romania	8:08.34	Q
2	Wojciech Repsz; Wiesław Długosz	Jacek Rylski	Poland	8:10.87	Q
3	Leo Ahonen; Leif Andersson	Antero Yli-Ikkelä	Finland	8:11.89	
4	Pedro Yucciolino; Rafael Garba	Raúl Mazerati	Argentina	8:31.51	

==== Repechage heat 4 ====
Rank	Rowers	Coxswain	Nation	Time	Notes
1	Heinz Mußmann; Bernd Krause	Stefan Kuhnke	West Germany	8:07.95	Q
2	René Furler; Nicolas Lindecker	Stefan Hablützel	Switzerland	8:11.53	Q
3	Jean-Claude Coucardon; Christian Durniak	Alain Lacoste	France	8:15.25	
4	Paul De Weert; Wilfried Van Herck	Guy Defraigne	Belgium	8:16.26	
5	Pedro Ciapessoni; Jorge Buenahora	Daniel Jorge	Uruguay	8:52.42	

=== Semifinals ===
The top three finishers in each heat advanced to Final A; others went to Final B.

==== Semifinal 1 ====
Rank	Rowers	Coxswain	Nation	Time	Notes
1	Wolfgang Gunkel; Jörg Lucke	Klaus-Dieter Neubert	East Germany	8:13.87	QA
2	Heinz Mußmann; Bernd Krause	Stefan Kuhnke	West Germany	8:19.86	QA
3	Wojciech Repsz; Wiesław Długosz	Jacek Rylski	Poland	8:20.69	QA
4	David Maxwell; Mike Hart	Alan Inns	Great Britain	8:21.61	QB
5	Mike Staines; Luther Jones	Aaron Herman	United States	8:25.40	QB
6	Mike Neary; Trevor Josephson	Robert Battersby	Canada	9:28.82	QB

==== Semifinal 2 ====
Rank	Rowers	Coxswain	Nation	Time	Notes
1	Vladimir Eshinov; Nikolay Ivanov	Yuriy Lorentsson	Soviet Union	8:07.34	QA
2	Oldřich Svojanovský; Pavel Svojanovský	Vladimír Petříček	Czechoslovakia	8:07.88	QA
3	Ștefan Tudor; Petre Ceapura	Ladislau Lovrenschi	Romania	8:10.89	QA
4	Dimitar Valov; Dimitar Yanakiev	Nenko Dobrev	Bulgaria	8:20.21	QB
5	Rolf Andreassen; Arne Bergodd	Thor Egil Olsen	Norway	8:30.29	QB
6	René Furler; Nicolas Lindecker	Stefan Hablützel	Switzerland	8:32.34	QB

=== Finals ===
==== Final B ====
Rank	Rowers	Coxswain	Nation	Time
7	Rolf Andreassen; Arne Bergodd	Thor Egil Olsen	Norway	7:58.45
8	David Maxwell; Michael Hart	Alan Inns	Great Britain	7:59.57
9	Mike Neary; Trevor Josephson	Robert Battersby	Canada	8:00.27
10	Dimitar Valov; Dimitar Yanakiev	Nenko Dobrev	Bulgaria	8:01.86
11	Mike Staines; Luther Jones	Aaron Herman	United States	8:04.80
12	René Furler; Nicolas Lindecker	Stefan Hablützel	Switzerland	8:05.54

==== Final A ====
Rank	Rowers	Coxswain	Nation	Time
1st place, gold medalist(s)	Wolfgang Gunkel; Jörg Lucke	Klaus-Dieter Neubert	East Germany	7:17.25
2nd place, silver medalist(s)	Oldřich Svojanovský; Pavel Svojanovský	Vladimír Petříček	Czechoslovakia	7:19.57
3rd place, bronze medalist(s)	Ștefan Tudor; Petre Ceapura	Ladislau Lovrenschi	Romania	7:21.36
4	Heinz Mußmann; Bernd Krause	Stefan Kuhnke	West Germany	7:21.52
5	Vladimir Eshinov; Nikolay Ivanov	Yuriy Lorentsson	Soviet Union	7:24.44
6	Wojciech Repsz; Wiesław Długosz	Jacek Rylski	Poland	7:28.92
