= Rowing at the 1968 Summer Olympics – Men's coxed four =

Men's coxed four at the Games of the XIX Olympiad
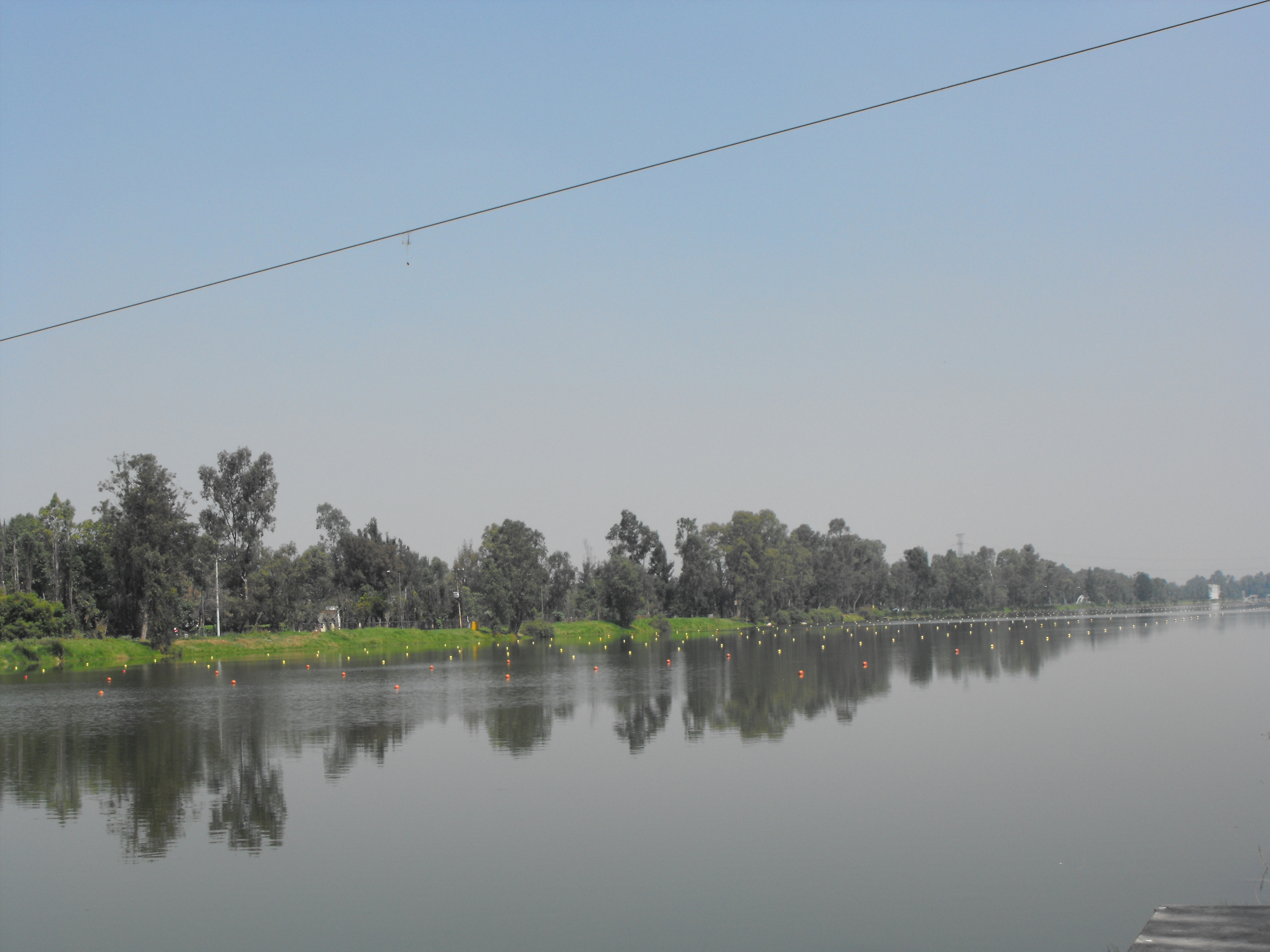
- The venue in 2015
- Venue: Virgilio Uribe Rowing and Canoeing Course
- Dates: 13–19 October 1968
- Competitors: 66 from 13 nations
- Teams: 13
- Winning time: 6:45.62

Medalists
1st place, gold medalist(s)		New Zealand: Dick Joyce; Ross Collinge; Dudley Storey; Warren Cole; Simon Dickie
2nd place, silver medalist(s)		East Germany: Peter Kremtz; Manfred Gelpke; Roland Göhler; Klaus Jacob; Dieter Semetzky
3rd place, bronze medalist(s)		Switzerland: Denis Oswald; Peter Bolliger; Hugo Waser; Jakob Grob; Gottlieb Fröhlich

The men's coxed four competition at the 1968 Summer Olympics took place at Virgilio Uribe Rowing and Canoeing Course, Mexico City, Mexico. It was held from 13 to 19 October and was unexpectedly won by the team from New Zealand, which secured the country its first Olympic rowing gold medal. Thirteen teams (66 competitors, with the Soviet Union making one substitution) from 13 nations attended the competition. East Germany earned its first medal in its debut in the event, taking silver (the 1960 and 1964 Olympic tournaments had both been won by the United Team of Germany, with West German crews). Switzerland took bronze, its first medal in the men's coxed four since 1952.

== Background ==
This was the 13th appearance of the event. Rowing had been on the programme in 1896 but was cancelled due to bad weather. The coxed four was one of the four initial events introduced in 1900. It was not held in 1904 or 1908, but was held at every Games from 1912 to 1992 when it (along with the men's coxed pair) was replaced with the men's lightweight double sculls and men's lightweight coxless four.

At the 1964 Summer Olympics, the men's coxed four event was won by the United Team of Germany. It was the last appearance of the German United Team. The 1962 World Rowing Championships had been won by the team from West Germany, and the 1966 World Rowing Championships had been won by East Germany. The West Germans had come second at the 1965 European Rowing Championships. The crew from the Soviet Union also belonged to the group of favourites, as they had won the last three European Rowing Championships and gained silver at the 1966 World Rowing Championships. A further medal contender was Italy, who had several previous Olympians in their boat. The New Zealand team had originally been selected as four rowers and a cox as a backup to the country's eight that had qualified. They started training together in Christchurch on the Avon River and gained the impression that they had the potential to win a medal as a coxed four. There were stern discussions with the New Zealand selectors but in the end, the rowers got their way and were put forward as a team of their own.

Mexico made its debut in the event; East and West Germany competed separately for the first time. The United States made its 11th appearance, most among nations to that point.

== Competition format ==
The coxed four event featured five-person boats, with four rowers and a coxswain. It was a sweep rowing event, with the rowers each having one oar (and thus each rowing on one side). The competition used the 2000 metres distance that became standard at the 1912 Olympics and which has been used ever since except at the 1948 Games.

The 1964 tournament introduced the "B" final, a consolation final that ranked rowers that had not qualified for the main, or "A", final. Races were held in up to six lanes. This rowing competition consisted of three main rounds (quarterfinals, semifinals, and finals), as well as a repechage round that allowed teams that did not win their quarterfinal heats to advance to the semifinals. Only one boat was eliminated in the first two rounds, with 12 of 13 advancing to the semifinals.

- Quarterfinals: Three heats, 4 or 5 boats per heat. The top three boats in each heat (9 boats) advanced directly to the semifinals; other boats (4 boats) went to the repechage.
- Repechage: One heat, 4 or 5 boats per heat. The top three boats advanced to the semifinal; the last-place boat was eliminated.
- Semifinals: Two heats, 6 boats per heat. The top three boats in each heat (6 boats total) advanced to Final A; the remaining boats (6 total) went to Final B.
- Finals: Two finals. Final A awarded the medals and 4th through 6th places; Final B was a consolation final for 7th through 12th place.

== Schedule ==
All times are Central Standard Time (UTC-6)

Date	Time	Round
Sunday, 13 October 1968	9:00	Quarterfinals
Tuesday, 15 October 1968	9:00	Repechage
Thursday, 17 October 1968	10:00	Semifinals
Friday, 18 October 1968	11:00	Final B
Saturday, 19 October 1968	11:00	Final A

== Results ==
=== Quarterfinals ===
Three heats were rowed on 13 October; these were the first three rowing races of the 1968 Summer Olympics. Two of the heats had four teams and one had five teams, with the first three teams to qualify for the semi-finals, and the remaining teams progressing to the repechage.

==== Quarterfinal 1 ====
Rank	Rowers	Coxswain	Nation	Time	Notes
1	Peter Kremtz; Manfred Gelpke; Roland Göhler; Klaus Jacob	Dieter Semetzky	East Germany	7:03.60	Q
2	Herman Rouwé; Erik Hartsuiker; Berend Brummelman; Tom Dronkert	Otto Weekhout	Netherlands	7:08.15	Q
3	Anatoly Nemtyryov; Nikolay Surov; Aleksey Mishin; Boris Duyunov	Viktor Mikheyev	Soviet Union	7:10.18	Q
4	Hugo Aberastegui; José María Robledo; Juan Carlos Gómez; Guillermo Segurado	Rolando Locatelli	Argentina	7:11.52	R
5	Jorge Castillo; Daniel Chávez; Avelino Soberón; Gregorio Blasco	Rafael Velasco	Mexico	7:51.39	R

==== Quarterfinal 2 ====
Rank	Rowers	Coxswain	Nation	Time	Notes
1	Dick Joyce; Ross Collinge; Dudley Storey; Warren Cole	Simon Dickie	New Zealand	7:12.19	Q
2	Reinhold Batschi; Petre Ceapura; Ștefan Tudor; Francisc Papp	Ladislau Lovrenschi	Romania	7:16.50	Q
3	Luther Jones; Bill Purdy; Tony Martin; Gardner Cadwalader	John Hartigan	United States	7:21.39	Q
4	Ramón Luperón; Santiago Cuesta; Jorge López; Lázaro Rivero	Roberto Ojeda	Cuba	7:41.11	R

==== Quarterfinal 3 ====
Rank	Rowers	Coxswain	Nation	Time	Notes
1	Romano Sgheiz; Emilio Trivini; Giuseppe Galante; Luciano Sgheiz	Mariano Gottifredi	Italy	7:08.60	Q
2	Denis Oswald; Peter Bolliger; Hugo Waser; Jakob Grob	Gottlieb Fröhlich	Switzerland	7:10.39	Q
3	Niko Ott; Peter Berger; Udo Brecht; Hans-Johann Färber	Stefan Armbruster	West Germany	7:12.04	Q
4	Jean le Goff; André Sloth; Jean Freslon; Jean-Pierre Grimaud	Roger Jouy	France	7:13.47	R

=== Repechage ===
One heat was rowed in the repechage on 15 October. Of the four teams competing, the first three would progress to the semi-finals. The team from the host nation was eliminated in the repechage.

Rank	Rowers	Coxswain	Nation	Time	Notes
1	Hugo Aberastegui; José María Robledo; Juan Carlos Gómez; Guillermo Segurado	Rolando Locatelli	Argentina	6:55.55	Q
2	Jean le Goff; André Sloth; Jean Freslon; Jean-Pierre Grimaud	Roger Jouy	France	7:05.48	Q
3	Ramón Luperón; Santiago Cuesta; Jorge López; Lázaro Rivero	Roberto Ojeda	Cuba	7:13.43	Q
4	Jorge Castillo; Daniel Chávez; Avelino Soberón; Gregorio Blasco	Rafael Velasco	Mexico	7:36.29	

=== Semifinals ===
Two heats were rowed in the semi-finals on 17 October. Of the six teams competing per heat, the first three would qualify for the final, while the others would progress to the small final.

==== Semifinal 1 ====
Rank	Rowers	Coxswain	Nation	Time	Notes
1	Dick Joyce; Ross Collinge; Dudley Storey; Warren Cole	Simon Dickie	New Zealand	6:48.65	QA
2	Luther Jones; Bill Purdy; Tony Martin; Gardner Cadwalader	John Hartigan	United States	6:54.22	QA
3	Romano Sgheiz; Emilio Trivini; Giuseppe Galante; Luciano Sgheiz	Mariano Gottifredi	Italy	6:58.24	QA
4	Hugo Aberastegui; José María Robledo; Juan Carlos Gómez; Guillermo Segurado	Rolando Locatelli	Argentina	7:02.25	QB
5	Niko Ott; Peter Berger; Udo Brecht; Hans-Johann Färber	Stefan Armbruster	West Germany	7:06.45	QB
6	Herman Rouwé; Erik Hartsuiker; Berend Brummelman; Tom Dronkert	Otto Weekhout	Netherlands	7:08.68	QB

==== Semifinal 2 ====
The team from the Soviet Union replaced one of their rowers in this heat, and swapped some seats. Arkady Kudinov rowed in this heat only.

Rank	Rowers	Coxswain	Nation	Time	Notes
1	Peter Kremtz; Manfred Gelpke; Roland Göhler; Klaus Jacob	Dieter Semetzky	East Germany	6:46.23	QA
2	Nikolay Surov; Aleksey Mishin; Anatoly Nemtyryov; Arkady Kudinov	Viktor Mikheyev	Soviet Union	6:48.16	QA
3	Denis Oswald; Peter Bolliger; Hugo Waser; Jakob Grob	Gottlieb Fröhlich	Switzerland	6:48.54	QA
4	Reinhold Batschi; Petre Ceapura; Ștefan Tudor; Francisc Papp	Ladislau Lovrenschi	Romania	6:52.67	QB
5	Jean le Goff; André Sloth; Jean Freslon; Jean-Pierre Grimaud	Roger Jouy	France	7:14.05	QB
6	Ramón Luperón; Santiago Cuesta; Jorge López; Lázaro Rivero	Roberto Ojeda	Cuba	7:26.62	QB

=== Finals ===
==== Final B ====
The small final (now termed B final) was raced on 18 October.

Rank	Rowers	Coxswain	Nation	Time
7	Reinhold Batschi; Petre Ceapura; Ștefan Tudor; Francisc Papp	Ladislau Lovrenschi	Romania	6:46.68
8	Hugo Aberastegui; José María Robledo; Juan Carlos Gómez; Guillermo Segurado	Rolando Locatelli	Argentina	6:50.54
9	Herman Rouwé; Erik Hartsuiker; Berend Brummelman; Tom Dronkert	Otto Weekhout	Netherlands	6:51.77
10	Jean le Goff; André Sloth; Jean Freslon; Jean-Pierre Grimaud	Roger Jouy	France	6:52.86
11	Ramón Luperón; Santiago Cuesta; Jorge López; Lázaro Rivero	Roberto Ojeda	Cuba	7:07.07
12	Niko Ott; Peter Berger; Udo Brecht; Hans-Johann Färber	Stefan Armbruster	West Germany	DNS

==== Final A ====
The final (now termed A final) was raced on 19 October. The New Zealand team unexpectedly beat the team from East Germany by over two seconds. In another surprise, the Swiss boat overtook the Italians for the bronze medal position. The win secured New Zealand its first Olympic rowing gold, and its third Olympic rowing medal in total. The Olympic competition was the first time that the team had raced together. The medals were presented by IOC vice-president Konstantin Adrianow.

Rank	Rowers	Coxswain	Nation	Time
1st place, gold medalist(s)	Dick Joyce; Ross Collinge; Dudley Storey; Warren Cole	Simon Dickie	New Zealand	6:45.62
2nd place, silver medalist(s)	Peter Kremtz; Manfred Gelpke; Roland Göhler; Klaus Jacob	Dieter Semetzky	East Germany	6:48.20
3rd place, bronze medalist(s)	Denis Oswald; Peter Bolliger; Hugo Waser; Jakob Grob	Gottlieb Fröhlich	Switzerland	6:49.04
4	Romano Sgheiz; Emilio Trivini; Giuseppe Galante; Luciano Sgheiz	Mariano Gottifredi	Italy	6:49.54
5	Luther Jones; Bill Purdy; Tony Martin; Gardner Cadwalader	John Hartigan	United States	6:51.41
6	Nikolay Surov; Aleksey Mishin; Anatoly Nemtyryov; Arkady Kudinov	Viktor Mikheyev	Soviet Union	7:00.00
