= Roland Göhler =

German rower (1943–2025)

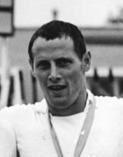
- Göhler in 1969

Medal record

Men's rowing

Representing East Germany

Olympic Games
Silver medal – second place	1968 Mexico City	Coxed four

World Rowing Championships
Gold medal – first place	1966 Bled	Coxless pair

Roland Göhler (26 March 1943 in Meißen, Saxony – 17 September 2025) was a German rower who competed for East Germany in the 1968 Summer Olympics.

He began his career as a member of SC Einheit Dresden, training under Hans Eckstein. Together with Peter Kremtz, Göhler won the German Democratic Republic Rowing Championship in 1964 and placed second in the 1965 and 1967 championships in the coxless pair.

In 1966, he won the World Rowing Championships in the coxless pair and, in 1968, he was part of the Olympic silver medal-winning team in the coxed fours event; the rest of the team was made up of Peter Kremtz, Manfred Gelpke, Klaus Jacob and coxswain Dieter Semetzky. For his part, Göhler received the bronze National Order of Service, a former East German civil award.

Göhler was originally a trained carpenter, before going on to study engineering and later heading the supervision of state building in Dresden.

Göhler died on 17 September 2025, at the age of 82.
