= Uruguay at the 1972 Summer Olympics =

- IOC code: URU
- NOC: Uruguayan Olympic Committee

in Munich
- Competitors: 13 (10 men, 3 women) in 5 sports
- Flag bearer: Darwin Piñeyrúa
- Medals: Gold 0 Silver 0 Bronze 0 Total 0

Summer Olympics appearances (overview)
- 1924; 1928; 1932; 1936; 1948; 1952; 1956; 1960; 1964; 1968; 1972; 1976; 1980; 1984; 1988; 1992; 1996; 2000; 2004; 2008; 2012; 2016; 2020; 2024; 2028

Uruguay competed at the 1972 Summer Olympics in Munich, West Germany. Thirteen competitors, ten men and three women, took part in twelve events in five sports.

During the 1972 Olympics, Uruguayan Delegation Members were staying in Building 31 (Connollystraße 31) at the Olympic Village. The building was also being used by athletes from Israel and Hong Kong. On September 5, 1972, militants from the Palestinian group Black September infiltrated the building and took 11 Israeli athletes as hostages, in what became known as the Munich Massacre. An official from the Uruguayan delegation, Luis Friedman, reportedly encountered one of the militants, Yusuf Nazzal. Nazzal had previously worked in the Village, so the delegate did not find anything unusual. During the early morning raid, many of the Uruguayan athletes were awoken by the commotion of the militants breaching the Israeli apartments. The delegation from Uruguay and Hong Kong were both evacuated by West German authorities.

== Athletics ==
Men's Hammer Throw

- Darwin Piñeyrúa

Women's 200 metres

- Josefa Vicent

Women's 400 metres

- Josefa Vicent

== Boxing ==
Men's Flyweight (– 51 kg)

- Jorge Acuña

- First Round – Lost to Leo Rwabwogo (UGA), 0:5

== Cycling ==
Five cyclists represented Uruguay in 1972.

Individual road race

- Walter Tardáguila – 74th place
- Mario Margalef or Mergaleff – did not finish (→ no ranking)
- Alberto Rodríguez – did not finish (→ no ranking)
- Jorge Jukich – did not finish (→ no ranking)

Team time trial

- Jorge Jukich
- Lino Benech
- Alberto Rodríguez
- Walter Tardáguila

== Rowing ==
Men's Coxed Pairs

- Pedro Ciapessoni, Jorge Buenahora and Daniel Jorge

- Heat – 8:29.51
- Repechage – 8:52.42 (→ did not advance)

== Swimming ==
Women's 100m Freestyle

- Susana Saxlund

Women's 100m Backstroke

- Felicia Ospitaletche

Women's 200m Backstroke

- Felicia Ospitaletche

Women's 100m Butterfly

- Susana Saxlund

Women's 200m Individual Medley

- Felicia Ospitaletche
