= Daniel Chávez =

Daniel Chávez may refer to:

- Daniel Chávez (Peruvian footballer) (born 1988), Peruvian football striker
- Daniel Chávez (Bolivian footballer) (born 1990), Bolivian football midfielder
- Daniel Chávez (rower) (born 1946), Mexican rower
- Daniel Chávez (tennis) (born 1966), Guatemalan tennis player
- Daniel Chávez Morán (born 1951), Mexican real estate developer
- Daniel Chávez García (born 1970), Mexican politician
- Danny Chavez (born 1987), American mixed martial artist
