= Svojanovský =

Svojanovský, Svoyanovsky or Svoyanovski is a Slavic masculine surname; its feminine counterpart is Svojanovska or Svoyanovskaya. It may refer to:

- Oldřich Svojanovský (born 1946), Czech rower
- Pavel Svojanovský (born 1943), Czech rower, brother of Oldřich
