= Vladimír Petříček =

Czechoslovak rower (born 1948)

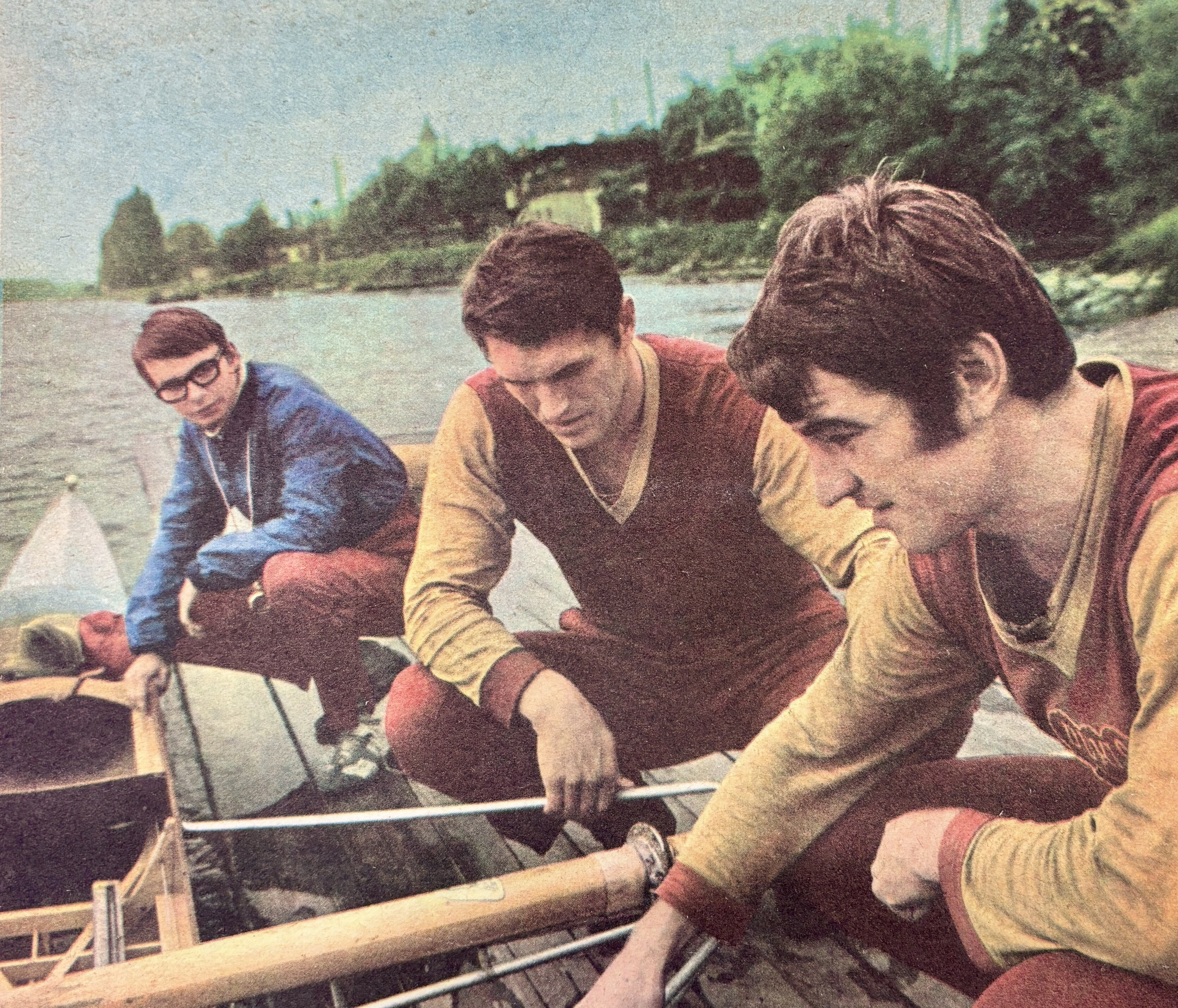
- Petříček (left) at the 1972 Olympics

Personal information
- Born: 17 June 1948 (age 78) Libiš, Czechoslovakia
- Height: 172 cm (5 ft 8 in)
- Weight: 52 kg (115 lb)

Sport
- Sport: Rowing
Medal record
Representing Czechoslovakia
Olympic Games
Silver medal – second place	1972 Munich	Coxed pair
Bronze medal – third place	1972 Munich	Coxed four
World Rowing Championships
Bronze medal – third place	1974 Lucerne	Coxed pair
European Rowing Championships
Gold medal – first place	1969 Klagenfurt	Coxed pair
Bronze medal – third place	1973 Moscow	Coxed four

Vladimír Petříček (born 17 June 1948) is a retired Czech rowing coxswain who competed for Czechoslovakia. He had his best achievements in the coxed pairs with Oldřich Svojanovský and Pavel Svojanovský, winning the European title in 1969, an Olympic silver medal in 1972, and a world championships bronze medal in 1974. He also won a bronze medal in the coxed fours at the 1972 Olympics and finished fourth in 1976.
