= Mussmann =

Mussmann (German: Mußmann) is a surname. It may refer to:

- Heinz Mußmann (born 1945), German rower
- Linda Mussmann (born 1947), American playwright
- Søren Mussmann (born 1993), Danish professional footballer
