= Hans-Johann Färber =

West German rower

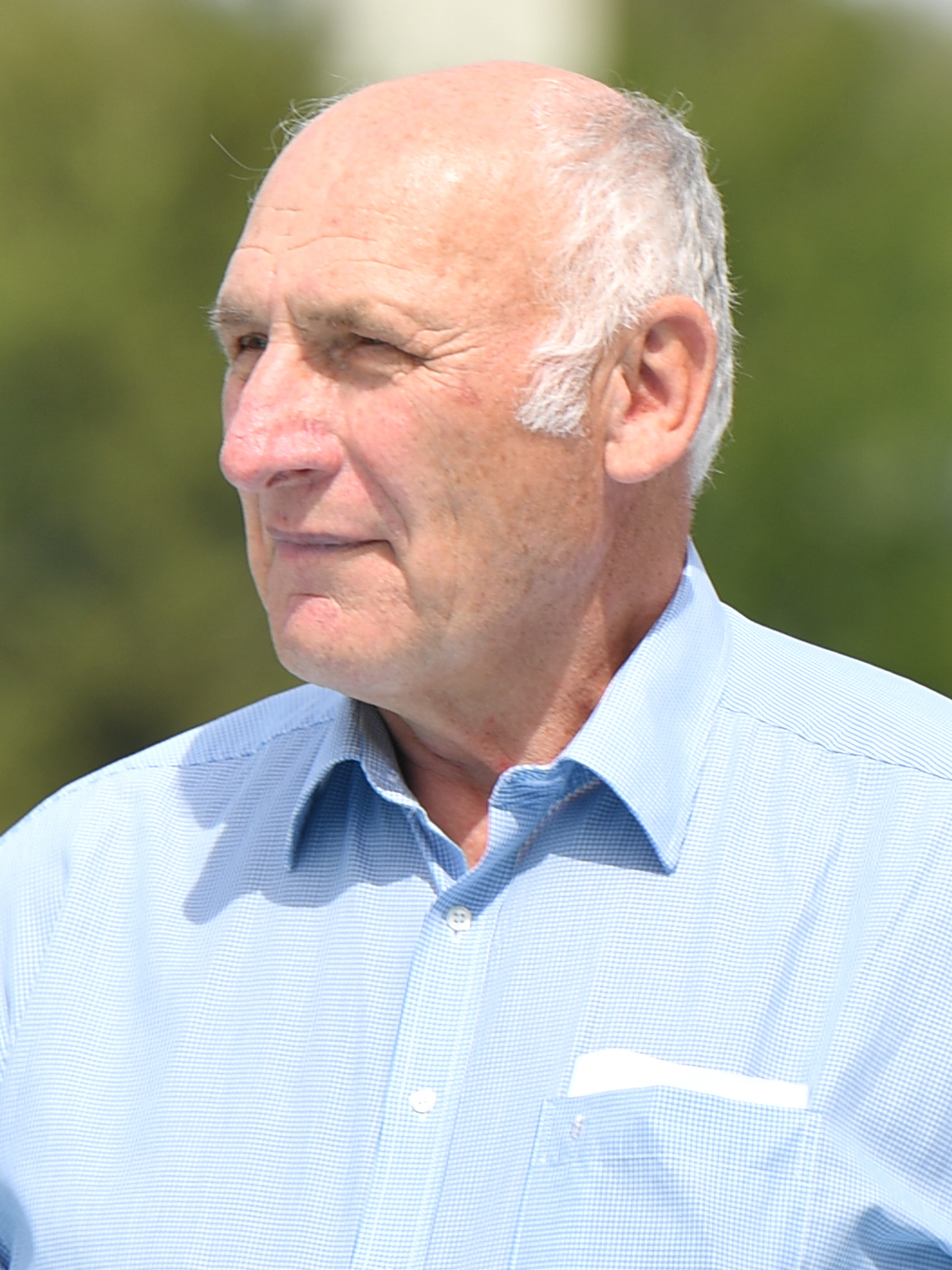
- Färber in 2022

Personal information
- Born: 20 April 1947 (age 79) Šljivoševci, Yugoslavia
- Height: 192 cm (6 ft 4 in)
- Weight: 102 kg (225 lb)

Sport
- Sport: Rowing
- Club: Wetzlar RG
Medal record
Men's rowing
Representing West Germany
Olympic Games
Gold medal – first place	1972 Munich	Coxed four
Bronze medal – third place	1976 Montreal	Coxed four
World Rowing Championships
Gold medal – first place	1970 St. Catharines	Coxed four
Bronze medal – third place	1974 Lucerne	Coxed four
Bronze medal – third place	1975 Nottingham	Coxed four
European Rowing Championships
Bronze medal – third place	1967 Vichy	Coxless pair
Gold medal – first place	1969 Klagenfurt	Coxed four
Gold medal – first place	1971 Copenhagen	Coxed four

Hans-Johann Färber (born 20 April 1947) is a German rower who competed for West Germany in the 1968 Summer Olympics, 1972 Summer Olympics and in the 1976 Summer Olympics.

== Rowing ==
At the 1967 European Rowing Championships, he won bronze with Udo Brecht in the coxless pair. At the 1968 Summer Olympics, he was a crew member of the West German boat that finished twelfth in the coxed four event. He competed at the 1970 World Rowing Championships in St. Catharines in the coxed four and won gold. He competed at the 1971 European Rowing Championships and won a gold medal with the coxed four. At the 1972 Summer Olympics in Munich, he was a crew member of the West German boat that won the gold medal in the coxed four event. At the 1974 World Rowing Championships in Lucerne, he won bronze with the coxed four. At the 1975 World Rowing Championships in Nottingham, he won bronze with the coxed four. At the 1976 Summer Olympics in Montreal, he was a crew member of the West German boat that won the bronze medal in the coxed four event.

== Family ==
Färber was born in Šljivoševci, Osijek-Baranja County, Socialist Republic of Croatia, Socialist Federal Republic of Yugoslavia. He lives with his wife in Schwaig in Bavaria. They have three daughters.

Since 2012, he has trained his granddaughter in rowing. Marie-Sophie Zeidler (born 1999) won silver at the 2016 World Rowing Junior Championships with the junior women's eight, and bronze at the 2017 World Rowing Junior Championships with the junior women's coxless pair.
