= Leif Andersson =

Leif Andersson may refer to:

- Leif Erland Andersson (1944–1979), Swedish astronomer
- Leif Andersson (biathlete) (born 1961), Swedish Olympic athlete
- Leif Andersson (footballer), Swedish former footballer
- Leif Andersson (animal geneticist) (born 1954), Swedish geneticist
- Leif Anderson (1925–1999), Swedish jazz expert and radio personality
- Leif Andersen (born 1971), Norwegian former footballer
- Leif Andersen (rower) (1936–2014), Norwegian rower
- Leif Andersson (Finnish rower) (born 1944), Finnish Olympic rower
- Leif Andersson (wrestler) (born 1949), Swedish Olympic wrestler
