= Hinteregger =

Hinteregger is a surname. Notable people with the surname include:

- Martin Hinteregger (born 1992), Austrian footballer
- Rainer Hinteregger (1944–1982), Austrian rower
