= Hablützel =

Hablützel is a surname. Notable people with the surname include:

- David Hablützel (born 1996), Swiss snowboarder
- Gianna Hablützel-Bürki (born 1969), Swiss fencer
- Stefan Hablützel (born 1958), Swiss rower
