= Soberón =

Soberón or Soberon may refer to:

- Avelino Soberón (born 1948), Mexican Olympic rower
- Claudia Soberón (born 1977), Mexican singer and an actress
- Edgar Soberón (born 1962), Cuban born painter and printmaker
- Francisco Soberón (1948–2022), human rights activist in Peru
- Guillermo Soberón Acevedo (1925–2020), Mexican scientist and politician
- Héctor Soberón (born 1964), Mexican actor
- Jorge L. Soberón, Mexican biologist
- José Villa Soberón (born 1950), Cuban artist, particularly known for his public sculptures around Havana
