= Thor Olsen =

Thor Olsen can refer to:

- Thor Olsen (weightlifter) (born 1929), Norwegian Olympic weightlifter
- Thor Egil Olsen (born 1957), Norwegian Olympic rower
