= Buenahora =

Buenahora is a surname. Notable people with the surname include:

- Hernán Buenahora (born 1967), Colombian cyclist,
- Jorge Buenahora (born 1950), Uruguayan rower.
