= Zaanen =

Zaanen is a surname. Notable people with the surname include:

- Adriaan Cornelis Zaanen (1913–2003), Dutch mathematician
- Herman Zaanen (born 1948), Dutch rower
- Jan Zaanen (1957–2024), Dutch physicist

== See also ==
- Rowin van Zaanen (born 1984), Dutch footballer
