= Aleksey Mishin =

Aleksey Mishin may refer to:

- Aleksey Mishin (rower) (born 1941), Russian Olympic rower who competed for the Soviet Union
- Aleksey Mishin (wrestler) (born 1979), Russian wrestler
- Alexei Mishin (born 1941), Russian figure skating coach
