= Stefan Armbruster =

German rower

Personal information
- Born: 26 March 1953 (age 71); Baden-Baden, West Germany
- Height: 165 cm (5 ft 5 in)
- Weight: 50 kg (110 lb)

Sport
- Sport: Rowing

Stefan Armbruster (born 26 March 1953) is a German coxswain who represented West Germany. He competed at the 1968 Summer Olympics in Mexico City with the men's coxed four where they came twelfth.
