= Pavle, Serbian Patriarch =

Patriarch of the Serbian Orthodox Church from 1990 to 2009

His Holiness Pavle
- Archbishop of Peć, Metropolitan of Belgrade and Karlovci, and Serbian Patriarch
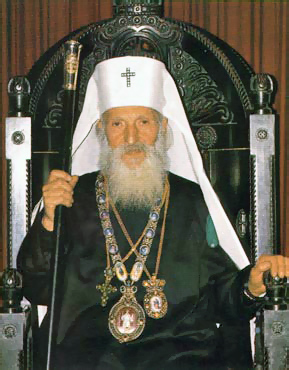
- Patriarch Pavle in October 1992
- Church: Serbian Orthodox Church
- See: Belgrade
- Installed: 1 December 1990
- Term ended: 15 November 2009
- Predecessor: German
- Successor: Irinej

Orders
- Ordination: 1954
- Consecration: 1957

Personal details
- Born: Gojko Stojčević; 11 September 1914 Kućanci, Austria-Hungary
- Died: 15 November 2009 (aged 95) Belgrade, Serbia
- Buried: Rakovica Monastery
- Denomination: Eastern Orthodoxy
- Parents: Stevan Okrajnov; Ana Stojčević

Styles of Serbian Patriarch Pavle
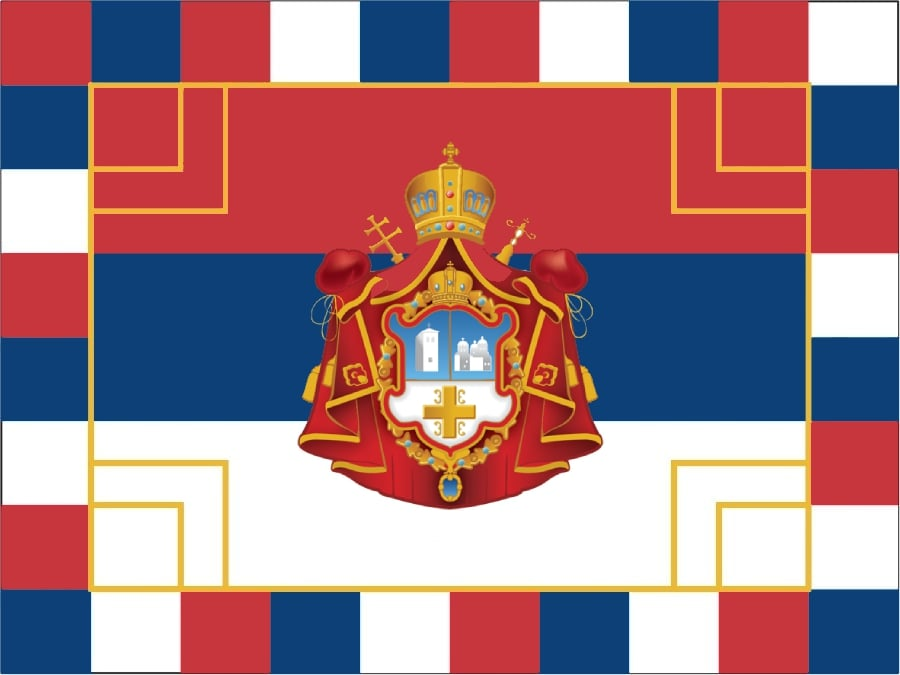
- Reference style: His Holiness
- Spoken style: Your Holiness
- Religious style: Patriarch
- Posthumous style: His Holiness Patriarch Pavle of Blessed Repose

Pavle (Serbian: Павле, English: Paul; born Gojko Stojčević; 11 September 1914 – 15 November 2009) was the 44th Patriarch of the Serbian Orthodox Church, serving from 1990 to 2009.

== Early life ==
Pavle was born as Gojko Stojčević on 11 September 1914 in the village of Kućanci near Magadenovac, then part of Austria-Hungary (present-day Croatia). He lost both of his parents in childhood, and was raised by an aunt Senka and grandmother Draginja. His father, Stevan Okrajnov, died of tuberculosis when he was three years old; shortly before that, his younger brother Dušan was born. His mother, Ana Stojčević, then remarried a widower, gave birth to two daughters — Ljuba and Vida, and then died herself while giving birth to the third girl.

After finishing elementary school, he graduated from a gymnasium in Belgrade, then studied at the seminary in Sarajevo. After completing seminary, he entered the University of Belgrade where he studied theology and medicine in parallel. He quit medicine, but graduated with a Theology degree in 1942. During the World War II he took refuge at the Holy Trinity Monastery in Ovčar and later moved to Belgrade.

During 1944, he was employed as a teacher and educator at the refugee children's home in Bosnia in Banja Koviljača. Once, when the children were running in the river, one boy began to drown and Gojko jumped into the cold water to help him. Soon he became seriously ill "on the lungs" and doctors believed that his illness was tuberculosis and they predicted he had another three months left to live. He then went to the Vujan Monastery where he lived for some time isolated from other monks and managed to cure this disease. In gratitude, he carved and donated a wooden crucifix to the monastery.

After the war, he worked in Belgrade as a construction worker, but because of his poor health he took monastic vows in Blagoveštenje Monastery in Ovčar in 1946. His monastic name became Pavle (Paul). He served as a Hierodeacon at the Blagoveštenje Monastery, and later in Rača Monastery between 1949 and 1955. In 1954, Pavle was ordained to the Holy Priesthood. The same year he was promoted to Protosyncellus, and in 1957 to Archimandrite.

Between 1955 and 1957 Pavle took post-graduate studies in the Theological School of the University of Athens, Greece. He received a doctorate in New Testament and liturgy by the Theological Academy in Athens.

== Bishop of Raška and Prizren ==
After returning from Greece, he was elected the Bishop of Raška and Prizren in 1957. He held the see for 33 years before he was elected Patriarch.

As Bishop of Raška and Prizren Pavle built numerous new churches and aided the reconstruction of old ones. He spent a lot of time traveling and meeting with his eparchy's believers. He also wrote books and gave lectures on church music and Church Slavonic.

== Serbian Patriarch ==
After spending 34 years in Kosovo, Pavle was elected the Serbian Patriarch in 1990, succeeding the ill Patriarch German, and moved to Belgrade. He was enthroned as the Patriarch in the Cathedral of Saint Archangel Michael in Belgrade on 2 December 1990, and at the Patriarchate of Peć Monastery, the ancient seat of the Serbian Church, on 22 May 1994. Six days after his election, the parliamentary election was held in Serbia, in which Slobodan Milošević's Socialist Party of Serbia came to power. At first, relations between the Church and the government were good, but gradually eroded because of the Yugoslav Wars and ongoing crisis in Serbia. Pavle had connections to the Karić family and had numerous meetings with Milošević and Mira Marković, but also with the leaders of the opposition. In 1993 Pavle wrote a letter to Milošević urging him to release Vuk Drašković from prison.

=== Yugoslav Wars ===
During the Yugoslav Wars, the Patriarch and the Church gave support to the leaders of the Bosnian Serbs (in Republika Srpska) and Croatian Serbs (in the Republic of Srpska Krajina). Patriarch Pavle had been heavily criticized for his actions during the wars. The Serbian Orthodox Church has been viewed as promoters of Serbian nationalism by a number of Bosnian Muslims, Croats and many historians. Patriarch Pavle visited the cities of Knin, Pale while Serbian troops carried out a siege on Goražde. Patriarch Pavle met with Serb paramilitary leader Arkan, who he claimed was justified in his actions and presented him with an autographed icon of Saint Nicholas; Arkan considered himself a favorite of Patriarch Pavle and regarded the Patriarch as his "commander", stating that "we are fighting for our religion, the Serbian Orthodox Church."

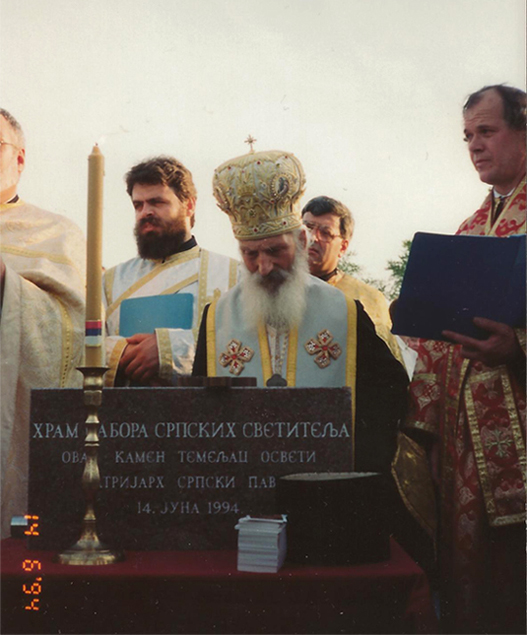
Laying the cornerstone for the All Serbian Saints Church in Mississauga, Canada, 1994

On 13 December 1991, Patriarch Pavle wrote a letter which circulated to all Serbian Orthodox churches urging for the protection of Croatian Serbs from "the Croatian neo-fascist regime - the successor of the Ustašas who massacred 700,000 Orthodox Serbs in World War II." He openly referred to the Republic of Croatia as the "new Independent State of Croatia" and justified the war as "righteous".

During the Bosnian War, Patriarch Pavle supported the President of Republika Srpska, Radovan Karadžić, in his rejection of the Vance-Owen peace plan and supported Karadžić in his claims that there were no Serbian rape camps that kept Muslim women, but accused Bosnian Muslims and Croats of the same thing. A famous photograph from this time is that of Karadžić kissing Patriarch Pavle's hand. In May 1993, Pavle received a letter from Karadžić which thanked him for his "advice and support" in the Bosnian Serbs' "just battle". Karadžić regarded the Serbian Orthodox Church as the "only spiritual force capable of uniting the Serb nation, regardless of borders." In 1994, Patriarch Pavle claimed that Serbs were native to Bosnia and Herzegovina and that Bosniaks had only arrived there when the Ottomans invaded.

When a swift Croatian offensive in May 1995 put the Western Slavonia region back into Croatian control, he urgently called Slobodan Milošević, asking if he will defend Serbia's "brethren in need". On 31 July 1995, he traveled to the Krajina capital Knin with Ratko Mladić to assure the rebel Serbs of military and religious support. However, the Republic of Krajina ceased to exist just three months later, following Operation Storm which resulted in 200,000–250,000 Serbian refugees.

In September 1997, Patriarch Pavle signed a declaration to the UN Security Council which demanded suspension of the proceedings against Karadžić before the Hague tribunal. Patriarch Pavle urged Belgrade not to give up Karadžić and Mladić, indicted for war crimes, to the International Criminal Tribunal for the former Yugoslavia. He and other nationalist intellectuals also signed a declaration demanding their pardon.

In 1998, Patriarch Pavle was invited to Zagreb by Croatian Roman Catholic Archbishop Josip Bozanić for talks on peace where he was snubbed by several leading Croatian party members and Christian groups for his and the Serbian Orthodox Church's role with the rebel Serbs during the war.

After the launch of NATO deployment into Kosovo in June 1999, Norwegian special force soldiers escorted Patriarch Pavle from Pristina to the Patriarchate of Peć Monastery near Peja. The escort mission was regarded to be possibly provocative so soon after the atrocities in the area in question and there were fears of a possible assassination of Patriarch Pavle. The Patriarch and the Norwegian soldiers were attacked several times on their way.

=== 1996–1997 protests in Serbia ===
In 1997, Patriarch Pavle took part in the massive anti-government protests. On 27 January (Saint Sava Day) he led the protesters to break the police cordon in Kolarčeva Street. This was the first time that Patriarch Pavle openly confronted Milošević's government. Although in following years he became close to the opposition leaders and confronted Milošević, Patriarch Pavle took part in the 1999 Republic Day celebration where he congratulated Milošević. Patriarch Pavle later apologized and said that it was misinterpreted. After this, the relations between Patriarch Pavle and Milošević hit new lows. In 2000, Milošević didn't send Patriarch Pavle Christmas congratulations for the first time. Patriarch Pavle later called Milošević and his government responsible for the Yugoslav catastrophe and asked him to resign. After the overthrow of Slobodan Milošević, Patriarch Pavle continued to cooperate with the government and was a frequent guest at various political ceremonies.

=== Later years ===
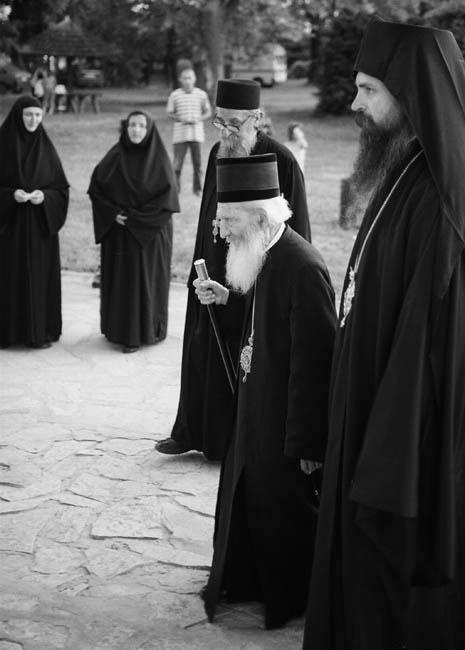
Patriarch Pavle at the Gračanica Monastery

Patriarch Pavle was referred to by some as the "living saint" based on his simple lifestyle and personal humility. All of the bishops of the Serbian Orthodox Church had cars, which they used to travel through their dioceses, except Pavle. When asked why he had never owned a car, he replied: "I will not purchase one until every Albanian and Serb household in Kosovo has an automobile." Asked by foreign journalists about alleged Church support for the Greater Serbian project, Pavle answered:

So I say: if a Great Serbia should be held by committing crime, I would never accept it; may Great Serbia disappear, but to hold it by crime - no. If it were necessary to hold only a small Serbia by crime, I would not accept it. May small Serbia disappear, but to hold it by crime - no. And if there is only one Serb, and if I am that last Serb, to hold on by crime - I do not accept. May we disappear, but disappear as humans, because then we will not disappear, we will be alive in the hands of the living God.

In his tenure as the Patriarch he healed the schism with the "Free Serbian Orthodox Church" and made efforts to heal the ongoing schism in North Macedonia with the Macedonian Orthodox Church, which was considered uncanonical by the Ecumenical Patriarchate of Constantinople and all other Eastern Orthodox churches. During his term, Patriarch Pavle visited numerous eparchies of the Serbian Orthodox Church abroad, mainly in Australia, the United States, Canada, and Western Europe. He also visited Russia, and was also a guest at the United Nations Headquarters in New York City and at the White House.

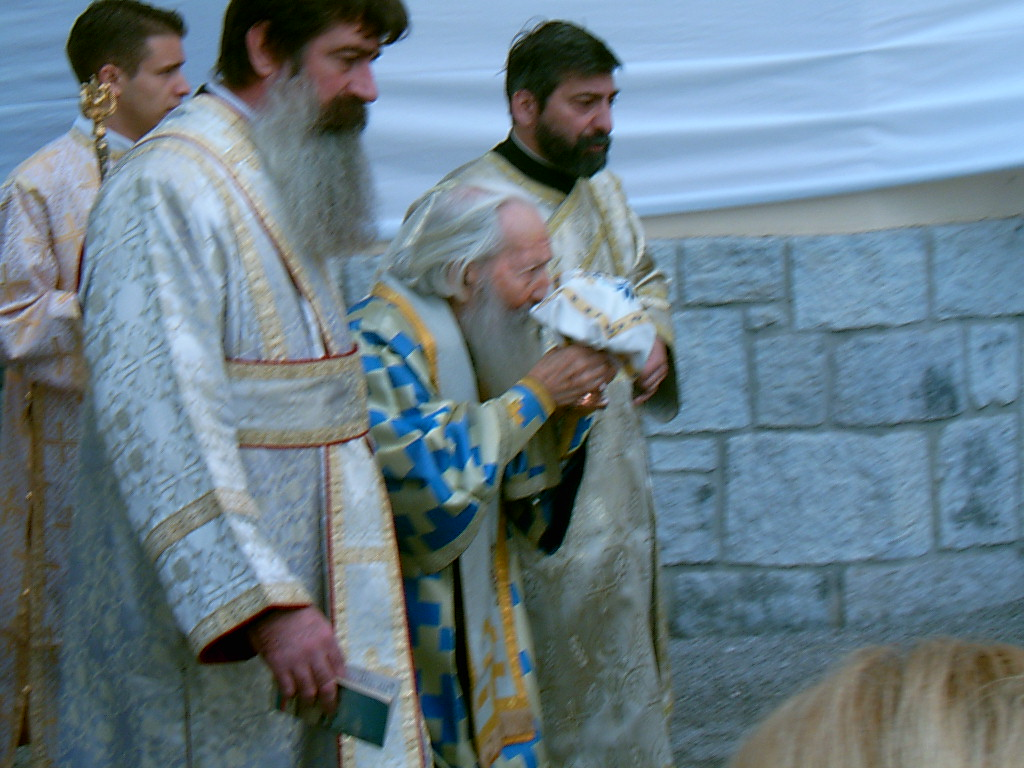
Patriarch Pavle at the consecration of Church of Sts. Cyril and Methodius in Ljubljana, Slovenia, 2005

Patriarch Pavle was the oldest among all living Patriarchs. He was especially devoted to and fond of the words of the Apostle Paul, his namesake, whom he often quoted and expressed admiration for.

In October 2004, Pavle wrote an open letter in which he denounced the elections in Kosovo and urged Serbs to boycott the polls.

On 27 April 2007, the Holy Synod of the Serbian Orthodox Church announced that it had named the Metropolitan Jovan Pavlović of Zagreb and Ljubljana, as the Guardian of the Throne (taking over the Patriarch's duties temporarily) while Patriarch Pavle was recovering at the Saint Sava Hospital. He was discharged on 1 May and returned to his duties on 14 May. The Patriarch's health worsened and he was restricted to a wheelchair. On 13 November 2007 Pavle was admitted to Military Medical Academy, and the Metropolitan Amfilohije Radović of Montenegro and the Littoral, as the oldest member, was elected by the Holy Synod to conduct the duties of the Patriarch.

On 20 November 2007 it was announced that his life was in danger. On 17 May 2008 the Holy Synod took over all Patriarch Pavle's duties owing to his inability to carry out his functions. On 12 October 2008 Pavle was reported to have asked the Holy Synod to accept his resignation because of declining physical ability. On 11 November 2008, the Holy Synod decided to turn down his request and to ask him to remain on the throne for life.

=== Death ===
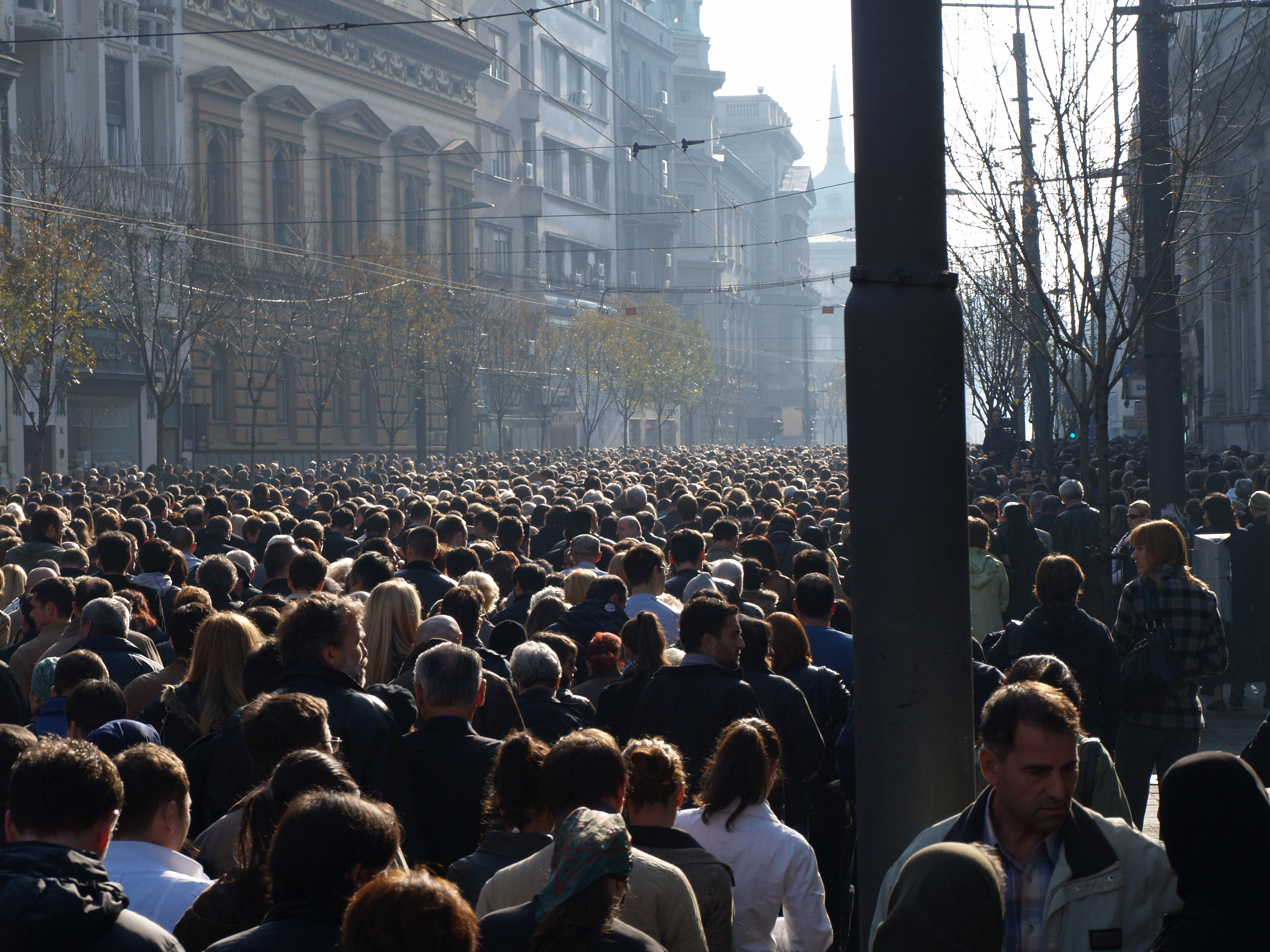
Crowd in Belgrade during funeral

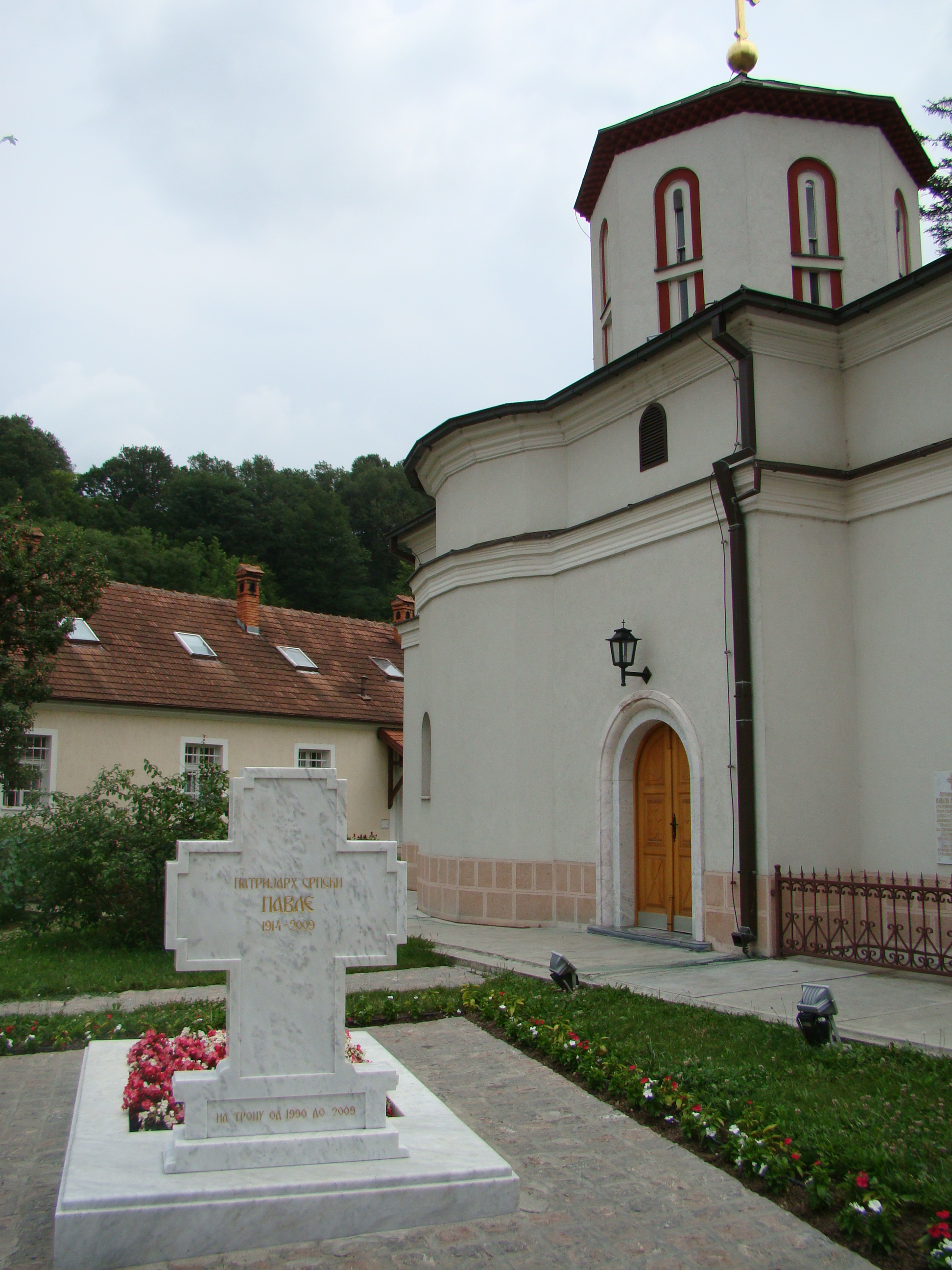
Tomb at the Rakovica Monastery

Before his death, Patriarch Pavle was the oldest living leader of an Eastern Orthodox church. He died on 15 November 2009, after more than two years spent at the Military Medical Academy in Belgrade. People were able to pay tribute to Patriarch Pavle at the Cathedral of Saint Archangel Michael in Belgrade. The Divine Liturgy was held on 19 November at the Cathedral of Saint Archangel Michael, with Ecumenical Patriarch Bartholomew I presiding, while the funeral service was held outside of Church of Saint Sava and he was laid to rest on 19 November, at the Rakovica Monastery. The funeral was attended by Ecumenical Patriarch Bartholomew I of Constantinople, Patriarch Daniel of Romania, Metropolitan Filaret of Minsk and Slutsk, Archbishop Anastasios of Albania, Metropolitan Christopher of Prague, and Roman Catholic Cardinal Angelo Sodano.

The Government of Serbia announced three days of national mourning over the death of Patriarch Pavle, while Republika Srpska, the City of Belgrade and Brčko District declared the funeral day as the official day of mourning. President Boris Tadić said that the Patriarch's death was an "irredeemable loss for the entire Serbian nation."

Condolences to the Serbian Church, people and officials were sent by Patriarch Kirill of Moscow, Bulgarian Orthodox Church, Ecumenical Patriarch Bartholomew I of Constantinople, Archbishop Ieronymos II of Athens, who also held a memorial service, Patriarch Daniel of Romania, Pope Benedict XVI, Cardinal Walter Kasper, Presidents and heads of Government of Russia, Belarus, Ukraine, Germany, and France as well as leaders of countries that are canonical territory of the Serbian Orthodox Church - Bosnia and Herzegovina, Croatia, Montenegro. The Jewish community, both Islamic communities in Serbia, the Islamic community in Bosnia, and the Roman Catholic Church in Serbia sent condolences.

== Awards and honors ==
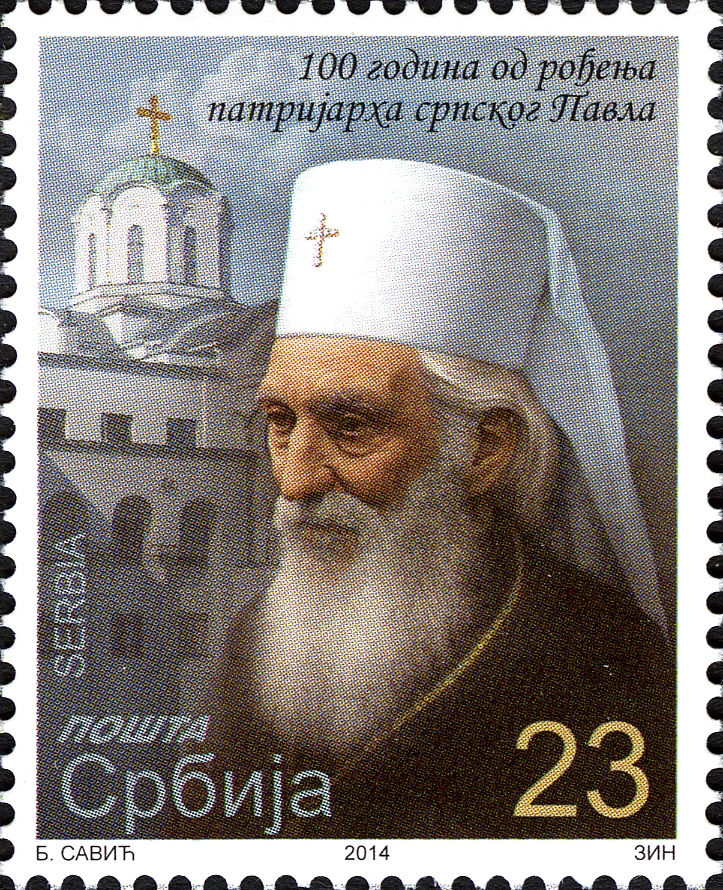
2014 postal stamp, issued on the centennial of Patriarch Pavle's birth

- Order of the Republika Srpska, 2009
- Order of Karađorđe's Star, 2007
- Order of the Holy Prince Vladimir Equal to the Apostles of the First Degree, 2004
- Award of the Unity of Orthodox Nations Foundation, 2002
- Honorary Doctorate of Divinity, 1988

== See also ==
- List of heads of the Serbian Orthodox Church
- List of 20th-century religious leaders
- List of 21st-century religious leaders

Eastern Orthodox Church titles
| Preceded by German | Serbian Patriarch; 1990–2009 | Succeeded by Irinej |
| Preceded by Vladimir Rajić | Bishop of Raška and Prizren; 1957–1990 | Succeeded by Artemije Radosavljević |
