= Stefan Kuhnke =

German rower

Personal information
- Nationality: German
- Born: 7 January 1959 (age 66); Bad Kreuznach, West Germany

Sport
- Sport: Rowing

Stefan Kuhnke (born 7 January 1959) is a German rower. He competed in the men's coxed pair event at the 1972 Summer Olympics.
