= Trevor Josephson =

Canadian rower

Personal information
- Nationality: Canadian
- Born: 31 January 1951 (age 74); Princeton, British Columbia, Canada

Sport
- Sport: Rowing

Trevor Josephson (born 31 January 1951) is a Canadian rower. He competed in the men's coxed pair event at the 1972 Summer Olympics.
