= Gardner Cadwalader =

American rower (born 1948)

Personal information
- Born: July 29, 1948 (age 78) Chestnut Hill, Philadelphia, United States

Sport
- Sport: Rowing

Gardner Cadwalader (born July 29, 1948) is an American rower. He competed in the men's coxed four event at the 1968 Summer Olympics. He subsequently rowed in the winning Cambridge Boat Race crew in 1972.
