= Udo Brecht =

German rower (1943–2026)

Personal information
- Born: 30 April 1943 Speyer, Germany
- Died: 15 July 2026 (aged 83)
- Height: 176 cm (5 ft 9 in)
- Weight: 74 kg (163 lb)

Sport
- Sport: Rowing
Medal record
Men's rowing
Representing West Germany
World Rowing Championships
Bronze medal – third place	1970 St. Catharines	Coxless pair
European Rowing Championships
Bronze medal – third place	1967 Vichy	Coxless pair

Udo Brecht (30 April 1943 – 15 July 2026) was a German rower who represented West Germany.

At the 1967 European Rowing Championships in Vichy, Brecht won bronze with Hans-Johann Färber in the coxless pair. He competed at the 1968 Summer Olympics in Mexico City with the men's coxed four where they came twelfth. At the 1970 World Rowing Championships in St. Catharines, he won bronze in the coxless pair, this time partnered with Lutz Ulbricht.

Brecht died on 15 July 2026, at the age of 83.
