= Nicolas Lindecker =

Swiss rower

Personal information
- Nationality: Swiss
- Born: 16 April 1947 (age 78)
- Died: 7 October 2025 Zurich, Switzerland

Sport
- Sport: Rowing

Nicolas Lindecker (born 16 April 1947) was a Swiss rower. He competed in the men's coxed pair event at the 1972 Summer Olympics.

He was married to Israeli athlete Aviva Balas.
