= Wilfried Van Herck =

Belgian rower (born 1946)

Personal information
- Nationality: Belgian
- Born: 16 April 1946 (age 79); Antwerp, Belgium

Sport
- Sport: Rowing

Wilfried Van Herck (born 16 April 1946) is a Belgian rower. He competed in the men's coxed pair event at the 1972 Summer Olympics.
