= Rolando Locatelli =

Argentine rower

Personal information
- Born: 22 October 1949 (age 76) Rosario, Argentina

Sport
- Sport: Rowing

Rolando Locatelli (born 22 October 1949) is an Argentine rower. He competed in the men's coxed four event at the 1968 Summer Olympics.
