= Robert Battersby (rowing) =

Canadian coxswain

Personal information
- Nationality: Canadian

Sport
- Sport: Rowing

Robert Battersby is a Canadian coxswain. He competed in the men's coxed pair event at the 1972 Summer Olympics.
