= Werner Grieshofer =

Austrian rower

Personal information
- Nationality: Austrian
- Born: 22 February 1960 (age 65)

Sport
- Sport: Rowing

Werner Grieshofer (born 22 February 1960) is an Austrian rowing coxswain. He competed in the men's coxed pair event at the 1972 Summer Olympics, and was 12 years and 187 days old at the time.
