= Jorge Castillo (rower) =

Mexican rower (born 1939)

Personal information
- Born: 31 March 1939 (age 85); Mexico City, Mexico

Sport
- Sport: Rowing

Jorge Castillo (born 31 March 1939) is a Mexican rower. He competed in the men's coxed four event at the 1968 Summer Olympics.
