= Gottlieb Fröhlich =

Swiss rower

Olympic medal record

Men's rowing
Bronze medal – third place	1968 Mexico City	Coxed four

Gottlieb Fröhlich (born 13 August 1948) is a Swiss rower who competed in the 1968 Summer Olympics.

He was born in Wohlen bei Bern.

In 1968 he was the coxswain of the Swiss boat which won the bronze medal in the coxed fours competition.
