= Berend Brummelman =

Dutch rower

Personal information
- Nationality: Dutch
- Born: 2 January 1943; Eefde, Netherlands
- Died: 9 April 2023 (aged 80)

Sport
- Sport: Rowing

Berend Brummelman (2 January 1943 – 9 April 2023) was a Dutch rower. He competed in the men's coxed four event at the 1968 Summer Olympics.
