= Petre Ceapura =

Romanian rower

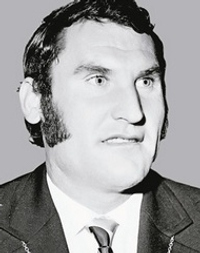

Personal information
- Born: 12 July 1942 (age 83) Jurilovca, Romania
- Height: 188 cm (6 ft 2 in)
- Weight: 94 kg (207 lb)

Sport
- Sport: Rowing
- Club: CS Dinamo București
Medal record
Representing Romania
Olympic Games
| Bronze medal – third place | 1972 Munich | Coxed pair |
World Rowing Championships
| Gold medal – first place | 1970 St. Catharines | Coxed pair |
European Rowing Championships
| Bronze medal – third place | 1967 Vichy | Coxed four |
| Bronze medal – third place | 1969 Klagenfurt | Coxed pair |
| Bronze medal – third place | 1973 Moscow | Coxed pair |

Petre Ceapura (born 12 July 1942) is a retired Romanian rower. He competed at the 1968, 1972 and 1980 Olympics in the coxed fours (1968) and coxed pairs (1972 and 1980) and won a bronze medal in 1972, placing fourth in 1980. In 1970, he became the first world champion in rowing from Romania. He also won three bronze medals at the European championships in 1967–1973. After retiring from competitions, he worked as a coach at his club Dinamo București.
