= Klaus-Dieter Neubert =

East German rowing coxswain

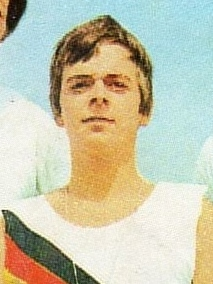
- Neubert in 1972

Personal information
- Born: 22 November 1949 (age 76) Oberwiesenthal, East Germany
- Height: 169 cm (5 ft 7 in)
- Weight: 52 kg (115 lb)

Sport
- Sport: Rowing
- Club: SC Berlin-Grünau
Medal record
Representing East Germany
Olympic Games
Gold medal – first place	1972 Munich	Coxed pair
World Rowing Championships
Silver medal – second place	1974 Lucerne	Coxed pair
European Rowing Championships
Gold medal – first place	1971 Copenhagen	Coxed pair
Silver medal – second place	1973 Moscow	Coxed pair

Klaus-Dieter Neubert (born 22 November 1949) is a retired East German rowing coxswain, who had his best achievements in the coxed pairs, together with Wolfgang Gunkel and Jörg Lucke. They won the European title in 1971 and the Olympic gold medal in 1972, and finished second at the 1973 European and 1974 World Championships. Neubert placed fourth at the 1968 Olympics with another crew.
