= Rafael Velasco (rowing) =

Mexican rower (born 1944)

Personal information
- Born: 24 October 1944 (age 80); Mexico City, Mexico

Sport
- Sport: Rowing

Rafael Velasco (born 24 October 1944) is a Mexican rower. He competed in the men's coxed four event at the 1968 Summer Olympics.
