= Santiago Cuesta =

Cuban rower (born 1947)

Personal information
- Nationality: Cuban
- Born: 22 November 1947 (age 77)

Sport
- Sport: Rowing

Santiago Cuesta (born 22 November 1947) is a Cuban rower. He competed in the men's coxed four event at the 1968 Summer Olympics.
