= Roger Jouy =

French rower

Personal information
- Nationality: French
- Born: 21 January 1934 (age 91); Paris, France

Sport
- Sport: Rowing

Roger Jouy (born 21 January 1934) is a French rower. He competed in the men's coxed four event at the 1968 Summer Olympics.
