= Kućanci =

Coordinates: 45°39′17″N 18°08′07″E

- Village (Selo)
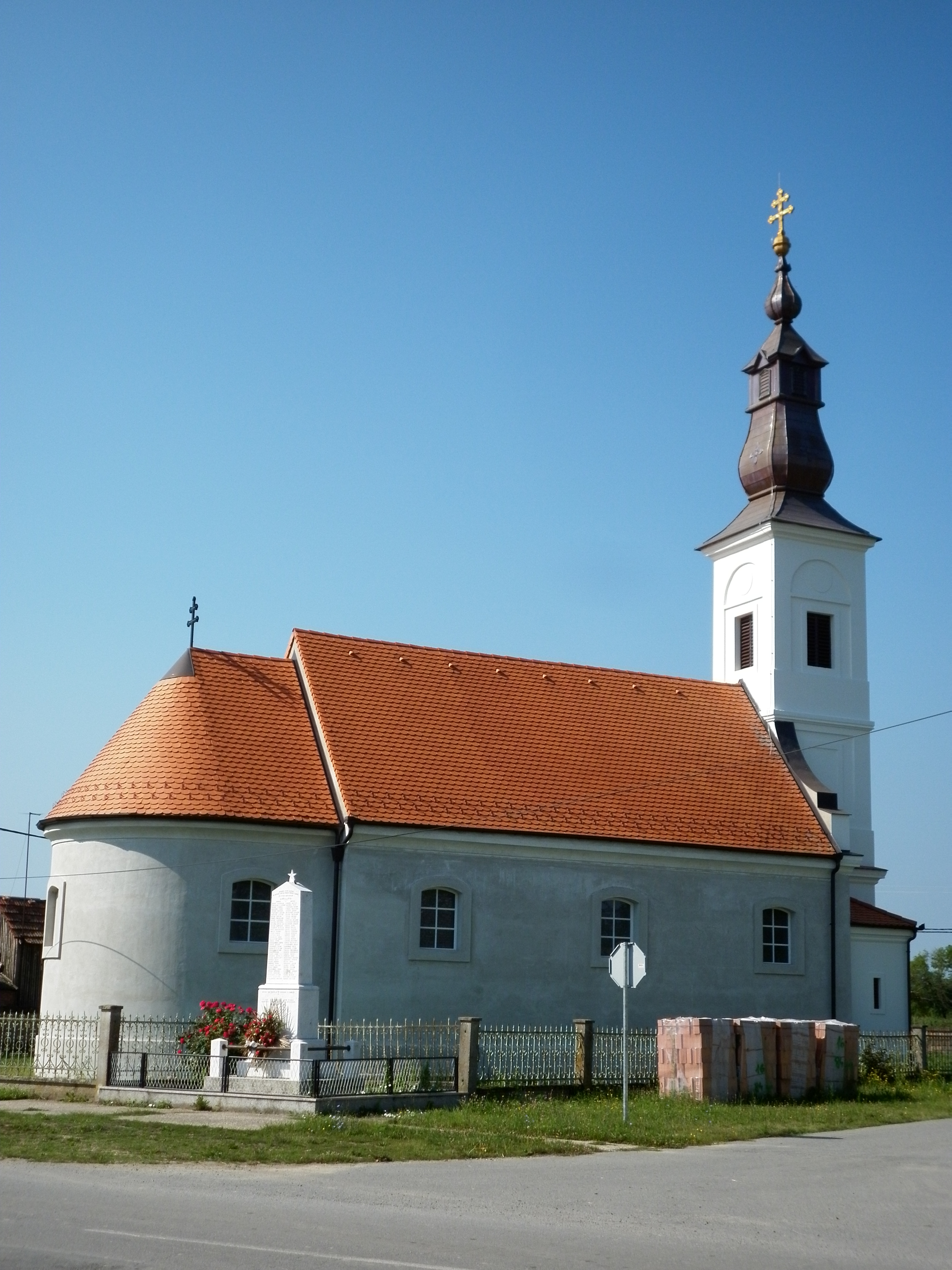
- Serbian Orthodox Church in the village
- Interactive map of Kućanci
- Country: Croatia
- County: Osijek-Baranja
- Municipality: Magadenovac

Kućanci is a village near Magadenovac, Croatia. In the 2011 census, it had 513 inhabitants.

== Population ==
Settlement of Kućanci: Population trends 1857–2021
v

population	813	853	783	911	1121	1338	1233	1457	1238	1332	1244	1012	840	715	622	513	401
	1857	1869	1880	1890	1900	1910	1921	1931	1948	1953	1961	1971	1981	1991	2001	2011	2021

Note:For 1971 a part of the data was in the settlement of Malinovac. Sources: Croatian Bureau of Statistics publications

== Notable people ==
- Pavle, Serbian Patriarch
