= Rafael Garba =

Argentine rower

Personal information
- Nationality: Argentine
- Born: 4 January 1944 (age 81)

Sport
- Sport: Rowing

Rafael Garba (born 4 January 1944) is an Argentine rower. He competed in the men's coxed pair event at the 1972 Summer Olympics.
