= Jakob Grob =

Swiss rower (born 1939)

Olympic medal record

Men's rowing
Bronze medal – third place	1968 Mexico City	Coxed four

Jakob Grob (born 28 March 1939) is a Swiss rower who competed in the 1968 Summer Olympics.

He was born in Obstalden.

In 1968 he was a crew member of the Swiss boat which won the bronze medal in the coxed fours competition.
