= Manfred Grieshofer =

Austrian rower

Personal information
- Nationality: Austrian
- Born: 4 April 1945 (age 79)

Sport
- Sport: Rowing

Manfred Grieshofer (born 4 April 1945) is an Austrian rower. He competed in the men's coxed pair event at the 1972 Summer Olympics.
