= Aaron Herman =

American rower

Personal information
- Full name: Aaron Benjamin Herman
- Born: February 17, 1953 (age 73) Stamford, Connecticut, United States

Sport
- Sport: Rowing

Aaron Benjamin Herman (born February 17, 1953) is an American rower. He competed in the men's coxed pair event at the 1972 Summer Olympics. He graduated from the University of Pennsylvania in 1974.
