= Gregorio Blasco (rower) =

Mexican rower (born 1944)

Personal information
- Born: 20 January 1944 (age 81); Mexico City, Mexico

Sport
- Sport: Rowing

Gregorio Blasco (born 20 January 1944) is a Mexican rower. He competed in the men's coxed four event at the 1968 Summer Olympics.
