= Jacek Rylski =

Polish rower

Personal information
- Nationality: Polish
- Born: 22 December 1956 (age 68); Warsaw, Poland

Sport
- Sport: Rowing

Jacek Rylski (born 22 December 1956) is a Polish rower. He competed in the men's coxed pair event at the 1972 Summer Olympics.
