= Magadenovac =

- Municipality
- Flag Coat of arms

- Location in Croatia Magadenovac (Croatia)
- Coordinates: 45.65°N 18.18°E
- Country: Croatia
- Region: Slavonia
- County: Osijek-Baranja County

Government
  - Mayor: Stjepan Živković

Area
  - Municipality: 112.9 km^{2} (43.6 sq mi)
  - Urban: 4.7 km^{2} (1.8 sq mi)

Population (2021)
  - Municipality: 1,579
  - Density: 13.99/km^{2} (36.22/sq mi)
  - Urban: 96
  - Urban density: 20/km^{2} (53/sq mi)
- Time zone: UTC+1 (Central European Time)
- Website: www.magadenovac.hr

Magadenovac (Serbian Cyrillic: Магаденовац) is a village and a municipality in Osijek-Baranja County, Croatia.

In the 2011 census, there were a total of 1,936 inhabitants, in the following settlements:

- Beničanci, population 520
- Kućanci, population 513
- Lacići, population 351
- Magadenovac, population 109
- Malinovac, population 92
- Šljivoševci, population 351

In the same census, 86.88% were Croats and 10.07% Serbs.

== Politics ==
=== Minority councils ===
Directly elected minority councils and representatives are tasked with consulting the local or regional authorities, advocating for minority rights and interests, integration into public life and participation in the management of local affairs. At the 2023 Croatian national minorities councils and representatives elections Serbs of Croatia fulfilled legal requirements to elect 10 members municipal minority councils of the Magadenovac Varoš Municipality.

== Notable people ==
- Pavle, Serbian Patriarch, born in Kućanci
