= Jean Freslon =

French rower

Personal information
- Nationality: French
- Born: 11 August 1946 (age 78); Tours, France

Sport
- Sport: Rowing

Jean Freslon (born 11 August 1946) is a French rower. He competed in the men's coxed four event at the 1968 Summer Olympics.
