= Giampaolo Tronchin =

Italian rower (1940–2021)

Personal information
- Nationality: Italian
- Born: 10 December 1940; Preganziol, Italy
- Died: 27 November 2021 (aged 80)

Sport
- Sport: Rowing

Giampaolo Tronchin (10 December 1940 – 27 November 2021) was an Italian rower. He competed in the men's coxed pair event at the 1972 Summer Olympics. Tronchin died on 27 November 2021, at the age of 80.
