= Antero Yli-Ikkelä =

Finnish rower

Personal information
- Nationality: Finnish
- Born: 5 March 1956 (age 69); Kimitoön, Finland

Sport
- Sport: Rowing

Antero Yli-Ikkelä (born 5 March 1956) is a Finnish rower. He competed in the men's coxed pair event at the 1972 Summer Olympics.
