= Wojciech Repsz =

Polish rower

Personal information
- Nationality: Polish
- Born: 19 March 1946 (age 79); Skarżysko-Kamienna, Poland

Sport
- Sport: Rowing

Wojciech Repsz (born 19 March 1946) is a Polish rower. He competed in the men's coxed pair event at the 1972 Summer Olympics.
