= Aviva Balas =

Israeli athlete

Personal information
- Native name: אביבה בלס
- Nationality: Israeli
- Born: 1946 (age 79–80) Baghdad

Sport
- Country: Israel
- Sport: Athletics
Medal record
Women's athletics
Representing Israel
Asian Games
Silver medal – second place	1970 Bangkok	400 m

Aviva Balas (Hebrew: אביבה בלס) is an Israeli athlete. She won the silver medal in the 400 m in the 1970 Asian Games. At the 1973 Maccabiah Games, she won the gold medal in the women's 400 m race.

In the summer of 1972, Balas set national records in the 400 m, 600 m and 800 m. Two of these records were not beaten until more than 20 years later, and the 600 m record was not beaten until 2024. Despite her good results, she wasn't selected for the 1972 Summer Olympics in Munich. However, thanks to the support of the German Athletics Association, which at the time was promoting her career, she was able to live in the Olympic village during the Games. Balas almost became a victim of the massacre by Palestinian militants, having originally planned to spend the fateful night in the Israeli delegation building. She was a good friend of the victims, Yossef Romano and Ze'ev Friedman.

It was also in Munich that Balas also met her future husband, the Swiss rower Nicolas Lindecker. She has lived in Switzerland since the mid-1970s, working as a physical education teacher.

Balas' exact date of birth is unknown. Official documents mention the year 1946, but she believes she is older and that her and her sister's dates have been mixed up – her older sister is younger according to the documents. She first grew up in Baghdad as part of the big Jewish community in Iraq. Her family had to flee the country and move to Israel in 1951.
