= Bill Purdy =

American rower

Personal information
- Born: June 26, 1946 (age 80) Chicago, Illinois, United States

Sport
- Sport: Rowing

Bill Purdy (born June 26, 1946) is an American rower. He competed in the men's coxed four event at the 1968 Summer Olympics.
