= Tony Martin (rower) =

American rower

Personal information
- Born: September 3, 1947 Philadelphia, Pennsylvania, United States
- Died: May 13, 2005 (aged 57)

Sport
- Sport: Rowing

Tony Martin (September 3, 1947 – May 13, 2005) was an American rower. He competed in the men's coxed four event at the 1968 Summer Olympics.
