= Jean le Goff =

French rower

Personal information
- Nationality: French
- Born: 22 February 1944 (age 81); Montrouge, France

Sport
- Sport: Rowing

Jean le Goff (born 22 February 1944) is a French rower. He competed in the men's coxed four event at the 1968 Summer Olympics.
