= Mario Semenzato =

Italian rower

Personal information
- Nationality: Italian
- Born: 15 July 1950 (age 74); Borgo Hermada, Italy

Sport
- Sport: Rowing

Mario Semenzato (born 15 July 1950) is an Italian former rower. He competed in the men's coxed pair event at the 1972 Summer Olympics.
