= Alain Lacoste =

French rower

Personal information
- Nationality: French
- Born: 16 October 1946 (age 78)

Sport
- Sport: Rowing

Achievements and titles
- Olympic finals: 1972 Summer Olympics

Alain Lacoste (born 16 October 1946) is a French rower and general practitioner. He competed in the men's coxed pair event at the 1972 Summer Olympics. He completed medical school in Lyon and worked as a general practitioner in Saint-Etienne-de-Cuines, France.
