= Pedro Yucciolino =

Argentine rower

Pedro Iucciolino
Personal information
- Nationality: Argentine
- Born: 23 September 1945 (age 79)

Sport
- Sport: Rowing

Pedro Iucciolino (born 23 September 1945) is an Argentine rower. He competed in the men's coxed pair event at the 1972 Summer Olympics.
