= Boris Duyunov =

Soviet rower

Personal information
- Born: 2 January 1944 (age 81); Dema, Ufa, Russian SFSR, Soviet Union
- Height: 187 cm (6 ft 2 in)
- Weight: 88 kg (194 lb)

Sport
- Sport: Rowing

Boris Duyunov (Russian: Борис Иванович Дуюнов; born 2 January 1944) is a Soviet rower from Russia. He competed at the 1968 Summer Olympics in Mexico City with the men's coxed four where they came sixth. In the semi-final, he was temporarily replaced by Arkady Kudinov.
