= Ștefan Tudor =

Romanian rower (1943–2021)

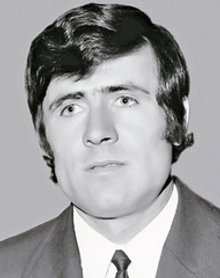

Personal information
- Born: 3 March 1943 Poienarii Burchii, Romania
- Died: 15 February 2021 (aged 77) Galați, Romania
- Height: 185 cm (6 ft 1 in)
- Weight: 92 kg (203 lb)

Sport
- Sport: Rowing
- Club: CS Dinamo București
Medal record
Representing Romania
Olympic Games
| Bronze medal – third place | 1972 Munich | Coxed pair |
World Championships
| Gold medal – first place | 1970 St. Catharines | Coxed pair |
European Championships
| Bronze medal – third place | 1967 Vichy | Coxed four |
| Bronze medal – third place | 1973 Moscow | Coxed pair |

Ştefan Tudor (3 March 1943 – 15 February 2021) was a Romanian rower.

== Career ==
He competed at the 1968, 1972 and 1976 Olympics in the coxed fours, coxed pairs and coxless fours events, respectively, and won a bronze medal in 1972. In 1970 he became the first world champion in rowing from Romania. He also won two bronze medals at the European championships in 1967 and 1973. He died less than one month short of his 78th birthday.
