= Arkady Kudinov =

Soviet rower

Personal information
- Born: 27 September 1942 (age 83) Vladivostok, Russian SFSR, Soviet Union
- Height: 191 cm (6 ft 3 in)
- Weight: 85 kg (187 lb)

Sport
- Sport: Rowing
Medal record
Men's rowing
Representing the Soviet Union
World Rowing Championships
Silver medal – second place	1966 Bled	Eight
European Rowing Championships
Silver medal – second place	1965 Duisburg	Eight

Arkady Kudinov (Russian: Аркадий Кудинов; born 27 September 1942) is a Soviet rower from Russia.

Kudinov was born in Vladivostok, Russia. At the 1965 European Rowing Championships in Duisburg, he won silver with the men's eight. At the 1966 World Rowing Championships in Bled, he won silver with the men's eight. He competed at the 1968 Summer Olympics in Mexico City with the men's coxed four where they came sixth. Kudinov rowed in the semi-finals only when he temporarily replaced Boris Duyunov.
