= René Furler =

Swiss rower

Personal information
- Nationality: Swiss
- Born: 8 August 1949
- Died: 23 November 2013 (aged 64)

Sport
- Sport: Rowing

René Furler (8 August 1949 – 23 November 2013) was a Swiss rower. He competed in the men's coxed pair event at the 1972 Summer Olympics.
