= Bernd Krause (rower, born 1947) =

German rower

Personal information
- Nationality: German
- Born: 31 May 1947 (age 77); Bremerhaven, Germany

Sport
- Sport: Rowing

Bernd Krause (born 31 May 1947) is a German rower. He competed in the men's coxed pair event at the 1972 Summer Olympics.
