= Tom Dronkert =

Dutch rower

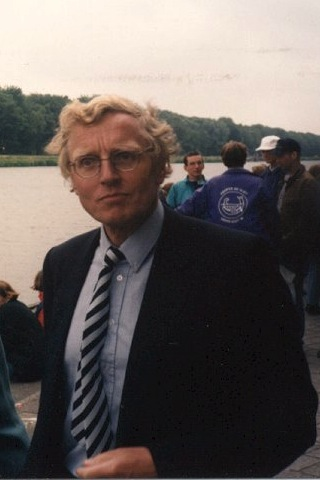
- Tom Dronkert in 1996

Personal information
- Nationality: Dutch
- Born: 3 December 1944 (age 80); Dordrecht, Netherlands

Sport
- Sport: Rowing

Tom Dronkert (born 3 December 1944) is a Dutch rower. He competed in the men's coxed four event at the 1968 Summer Olympics.
