= Jorge López (rower) =

Cuban rower (born 1943)

Personal information
- Nationality: Cuban
- Born: 26 August 1943 (age 82)

Sport
- Sport: Rowing

Jorge López (born 26 August 1943) is a Cuban rower. He competed in the men's coxed four event at the 1968 Summer Olympics.
