= Wiesław Długosz =

Polish rower

Personal information
- Nationality: Polish
- Born: 10 May 1948; Bodzanów, Poland
- Died: 19 December 2008 (aged 60); Szczecin, Zachodniopomorskie, Poland

Sport
- Sport: Rowing

Wiesław Długosz (10 May 1948 – 19 December 2008) was a Polish rower. He competed in the men's coxed pair event at the 1972 Summer Olympics.
