= John Hartigan (rowing) =

American rower (1940–2020)

Personal information
- Born: John DeStefani Hartigan; February 28, 1940 Minneapolis, Minnesota, U.S.
- Died: June 1, 2020 (aged 80)
- Height: 157 cm (5 ft 2 in)
- Weight: 52 kg (115 lb)

Sport
- Sport: Rowing
- Club: Vesper Boat Club
Medal record
Men's rowing
Representing United States
World Championships
Gold medal – first place	1974 Lucerne	Lwt eight
Pan American Games
Gold medal – first place	1983 Caracas	Coxed four
Bronze medal – third place	1979 San Juan	Coxed four

John DeStefani Hartigan (February 28, 1940 – June 1, 2020) was an American coxswain who twice competed at Olympic Games.

Hartigan was born in 1940 in Minneapolis, Minnesota, United States. He had spina bifida. He was a coxswain for the University of Pennsylvania, and he graduated from there in 1963. At the 1968 Summer Olympics, he coxed the men's four and they came fifth. He won a gold medal at the 1974 World Rowing Championships in Lucerne with the lightweight men's eight. At the 1979 Pan American Games in San Juan, Puerto Rico, he won a bronze medal with the coxed four. At the 1983 Pan American Games in Caracas, Venezuela, he won gold with the coxed four. He last competed at international level with the lightweight men's eight at the 1986 World Rowing Championships in Nottingham, England, where they came sixth.
