= Christian Durniak =

French rower

Personal information
- Nationality: French
- Born: 4 April 1949 (age 75)

Sport
- Sport: Rowing

Christian Durniak (born 4 April 1949) is a French rower. He competed in the men's coxed pair event at the 1972 Summer Olympics.
