= Otto Weekhout =

Dutch rower

Personal information
- Nationality: Dutch
- Born: 24 November 1941 (age 83); Delft, Netherlands

Sport
- Sport: Rowing

Otto Weekhout (born 24 November 1941) is a Dutch rower. He competed in the men's coxed four event at the 1968 Summer Olympics.
