= Dieter Semetzky =

German rower (born 1949)

Olympic medal record

Men's rowing
Silver medal – second place	1968 Mexico City	Coxed four

Dieter Semetzky (born 3 November 1949) is a German rower who competed for East Germany in the 1968 Summer Olympics.

He was born in Dresden.

In 1968 he was the coxswain of the East German boat which won the silver medal in the coxed fours event.
