= Pedro Ciapessoni =

Uruguayan rower (born 1946)

Personal information
- Nationality: Uruguayan
- Born: 2 November 1946 (age 78)

Sport
- Sport: Rowing

Pedro Ciapessoni (born 2 November 1946) is a Uruguayan rower. He competed in the men's coxed pair event at the 1972 Summer Olympics.
