= Mariano Gottifredi =

Italian rower (1930–2020)

Personal information
- Nationality: Italian
- Born: 29 August 1930; Gravedona, Italy
- Died: 8 February 2020 (aged 89)

Sport
- Sport: Rowing

Mariano Gottifredi (29 August 1930 – 8 February 2020) was an Italian rower. He competed at the 1968 Summer Olympics and the 1972 Summer Olympics.
