= José María Robledo =

Argentine rower

Personal information
- Born: 7 July 1939 (age 86); Rosario, Argentina

Sport
- Sport: Rowing

José María Robledo (born 7 July 1939) is an Argentine rower. He competed at the 1964 Summer Olympics and the 1968 Summer Olympics.
