= Ladislau Lovrenschi =

Romanian rower

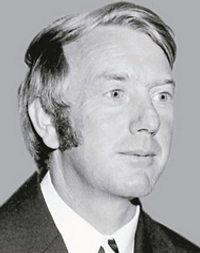

Personal information
- Born: 21 June 1932 Timișoara, Romania
- Died: 2011 (aged 78–79)
- Height: 158 cm (5 ft 2 in)
- Weight: 52 kg (115 lb)

Sport
- Sport: Rowing
- Club: CFR Timișoara; CS Dinamo București
Medal record
Representing Romania
Olympic Games
Bronze medal – third place	1972 Munich	Coxed pair
Silver medal – second place	1988 Seoul	Coxed four
World Rowing Championships
Gold medal – first place	1970 St. Catharines	Coxed pair
European Rowing Championships
Bronze medal – third place	1967 Vichy	Coxed four

Ladislau Lovrenschi (21 June 1932 – 2011) was a rowing coxswain. He was born in a Hungarian community in Romania, where he is also known as László Lavrenszki. He competed in the coxed pairs and coxed fours at the 1968, 1972, 1980 and 1988 Olympics and won a bronze medal in 1968 and a silver in 1988, placing fourth in 1980 and 1988. In 1970, he became the first world champion in rowing from Romania. He also won a bronze medal at the 1967 European Championships. After retiring from competition he worked as a coach at CFR Timișoara and assisted in training the Romanian national team.
