= Peter Kremtz =

East German rower

Medal record

Men's rowing

Representing East Germany

Olympic Games
| Silver medal – second place | 1968 Mexico City | Coxed four |

World Rowing Championships
| Gold medal – first place | 1966 Bled | Coxless pair |

Peter Kremtz (26 April 1940 – 23 February 2014) was a German rower who competed for East Germany in the 1968 Summer Olympics.

He was born in Meißen. In 1968 he was a crew member of the East German boat which won the silver medal in the coxed four event.
