= Nikolay Surov =

Russian rower

Personal information
- Born: Nikolay Vasilyevich Surov; 20 May 1947 Moscow, Soviet Union
- Died: 28 February 2010 (aged 62)
- Height: 190 cm (6 ft 3 in)
- Weight: 89 kg (196 lb)

Sport
- Sport: Rowing
Medal record
Men's rowing
Representing the Soviet Union
European Rowing Championships
Bronze medal – third place	1973 Moscow	Eight

Nikolay Vasilyevich Surov (Russian: Николай Васильевич Суров; 20 May 1947 – 28 February 2010) was a Russian Olympic rower who competed at the 1968 Summer Olympics in Mexico City representing the Soviet Union. He died on 28 February 2010 at the age of 62.
