= Avelino Soberón =

Mexican rower (born 1948)

Personal information
- Born: 9 January 1948 (age 77); Mexico City, Mexico

Sport
- Sport: Rowing

Avelino Soberón (born 9 January 1948) is a Mexican rower. He competed in the men's coxed four event at the 1968 Summer Olympics.
