= René Kieft =

Dutch rower

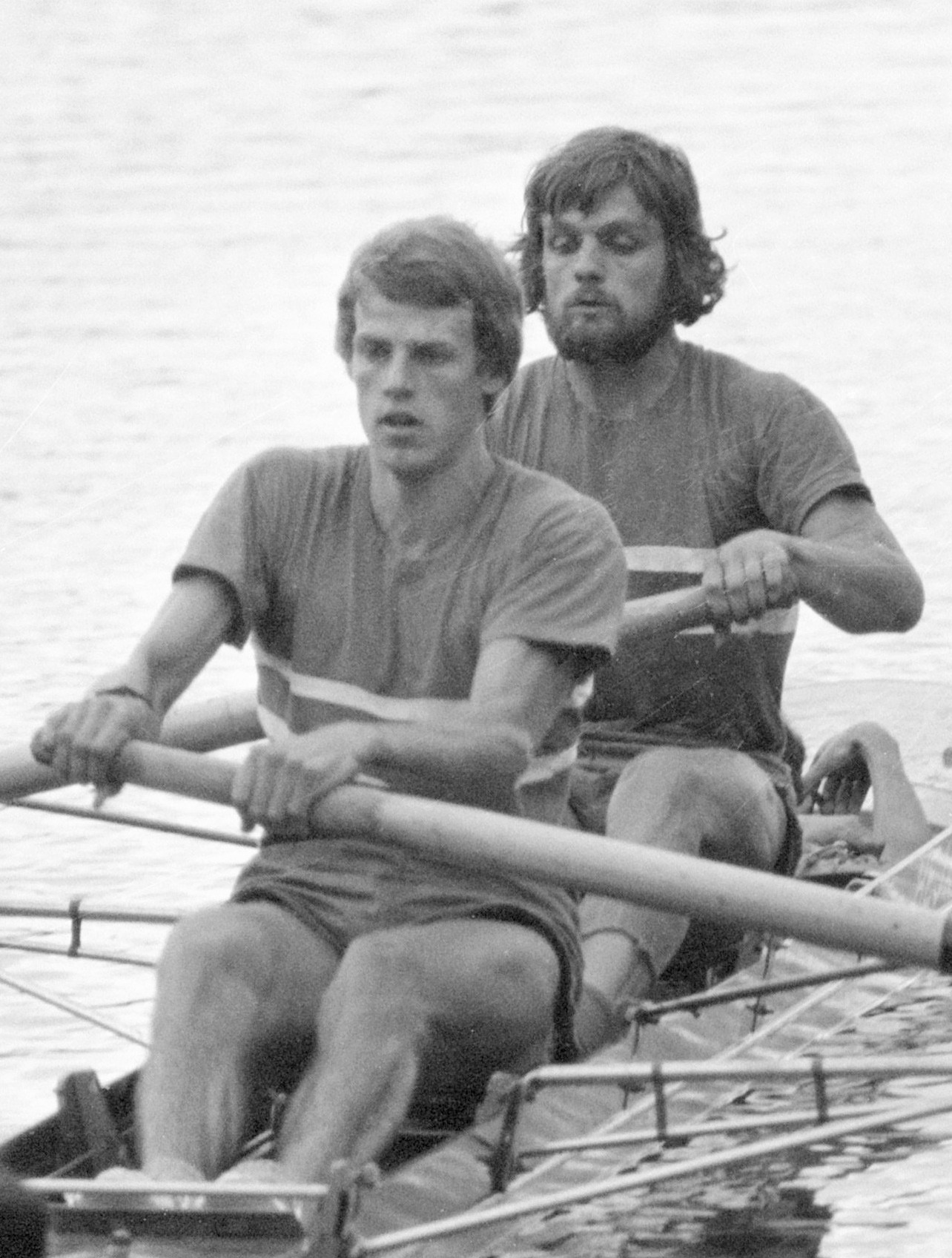
- René Kieft and Bernard Luttikhuizen in 1972

Personal information
- Born: 27 September 1946 (age 79) Andijk, the Netherlands
- Height: 1.92 m (6 ft 4 in)
- Weight: 92 kg (203 lb)

Sport
- Sport: Rowing
- Club: Proteus-Eretes, Delft

René Kieft (born 27 September 1946) is a retired Dutch rower. He competed at the 1972 Summer Olympics in the coxed pairs, together with Bernard Luttikhuizen and Herman Zaanen, but failed to reach the final.
