= Stefan Hablützel =

Swiss rower

Personal information
- Nationality: Swiss
- Born: 31 March 1958 (age 66)

Sport
- Sport: Rowing

Stefan Hablützel (born 31 March 1958) is a Swiss rower. He competed in the men's coxed pair event at the 1972 Summer Olympics.
