= Juan Carlos Gómez (rower) =

Argentine rower (1932–2021)

Personal information
- Born: 9 May 1932 Rosario, Argentina
- Died: 22 March 2021 (aged 88)

Sport
- Sport: Rowing
Medal record
Representing Argentina
Pan American Games
Gold medal – first place	1951 Buenos Aires	Coxless fours
Gold medal – first place	1955 Mexico	Coxless fours

Juan Carlos Gómez (9 May 1932 – 22 March 2021) was an Argentine rower. He competed at the 1964 Summer Olympics and the 1968 Summer Olympics.
