= Dimitar Valov =

Bulgarian rower

Personal information
- Nationality: Bulgarian
- Born: 24 April 1949 (age 77) Dolni Tsibar, Bulgaria

Sport
- Sport: Rowing

Dimitar Valov (Bulgarian: Димитър Вълов; born 24 April 1949) is a Bulgarian rower. He competed at the 1972 Summer Olympics and the 1976 Summer Olympics.
