= Francisc Papp =

Romanian rower

Personal information
- Nationality: Romanian
- Born: 17 December 1946 (age 78); Arad, Romania

Sport
- Sport: Rowing

Francisc Papp (born 17 December 1946) is a Romanian rower. He competed at the 1968 Summer Olympics and the 1972 Summer Olympics.
