= Manfred Gelpke =

German rower (born 1940)

- Manfred Gelpke in 1969

Personal information
- Born: 3 March 1940 (age 86) Dresden, Germany
- Education: DHfK
- Occupation: physical education teacher
- Height: 188 cm (6 ft 2 in)
- Weight: 84 kg (185 lb)

Sport
- Sport: Rowing
- Club: SC Einheit Dresden
Medal record
Men's rowing
Representing East Germany
Olympic Games
Silver medal – second place	1968 Mexico City	Coxed four

Manfred Gelpke (born 3 March 1940) is a German rower who competed for East Germany in the 1968 Summer Olympics.

He was born in Dresden and was a member of SC Einheit Dresden. At the 1968 Olympics he was a crew member of the East German boat that won the silver medal in the coxed four event. He later studied at the Deutsche Hochschule für Körperkultur (DHfK) to become a physical education teacher and from 1978, he worked at a school in Dresden.
