= Daniel Jorge =

Uruguayan rower

Personal information
- Nationality: Uruguayan
- Born: 26 May 1959 (age 65)

Sport
- Sport: Rowing

Daniel Jorge (born 26 May 1959) is a Uruguayan rower. He competed in the men's coxed pair event at the 1972 Summer Olympics.
