= Walter Tardáguila =

Uruguayan cyclist

Personal information
- Born: 13 July 1943 (age 83)
- Height: 1.73 m (5 ft 8 in)
- Weight: 62 kg (137 lb)

Cycling career
- Sport: Cycling
- Discipline: Road Cycling

Walter Tardáguila (born 13 July 1943) is a former Uruguayan cyclist. He competed in the individual road race and team time trial events at the 1972 Summer Olympics. In the individual road race Walter Tardáguila finished 74th, and in the 100 km Team Trial Walter Tardáguila's team finished 27th. In the individual road race, Tardáguila finished with a margin of 2:51.0 when compared to the leading team. In the 100 km Team Trial, Tardáguila's team finished with a time of 2-21:57.7. Notably, he witnessed and survived the Munich Massacre.
