= Bernard Luttikhuizen =

Dutch rower (1947–2026)

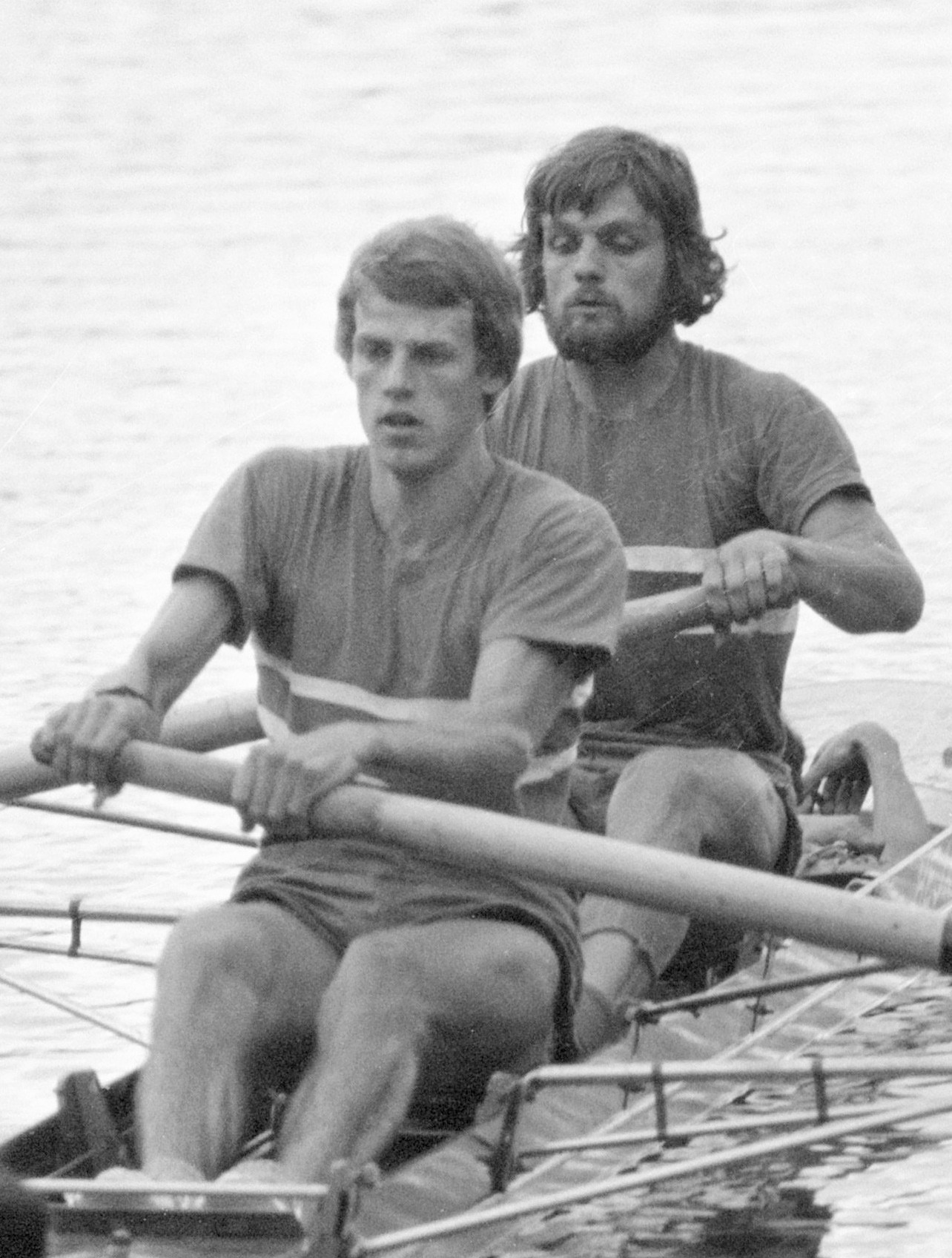
- Luttikhuizen (right) and René Kieft in 1972

Personal information
- Born: 28 November 1947 Beverwijk, Netherlands
- Died: 20 March 2026 (aged 78)
- Height: 1.97 m (6 ft 6 in)
- Weight: 90 kg (200 lb)

Sport
- Sport: Rowing
- Club: Proteus-Eretes, Delft

Bernard Luttikhuizen (28 November 1947 – 20 March 2026) was a Dutch rower. He competed at the 1972 Summer Olympics in the coxed pairs, together with René Kieft and Herman Zaanen, but failed to reach the final. Luttikhuizen died on 20 March 2026, at the age of 78.
