= Heinz Mußmann =

German rower (1945–2026)

Personal information
- Nationality: German
- Born: 23 November 1945 Hanover, Allied-occupied Germany
- Died: 1 September 2026 (aged 80)

Sport
- Sport: Rowing

Heinz Mußmann (23 November 1945 – 1 September 2026) was a German rower. He competed in the men's coxed pair event at the 1972 Summer Olympics. Mußmann died on 1 September 2026, at the age of 80.
