= Rainer Hinteregger =

Austrian rower

Personal information
- Nationality: Austrian
- Born: 16 February 1944
- Died: 12 January 1982 (aged 37)

Sport
- Sport: Rowing

Rainer Hinteregger (16 February 1944 – 12 January 1982) was an Austrian rower. He competed in the men's coxed pair event at the 1972 Summer Olympics.
