= Linda Mussmann =

American playwright

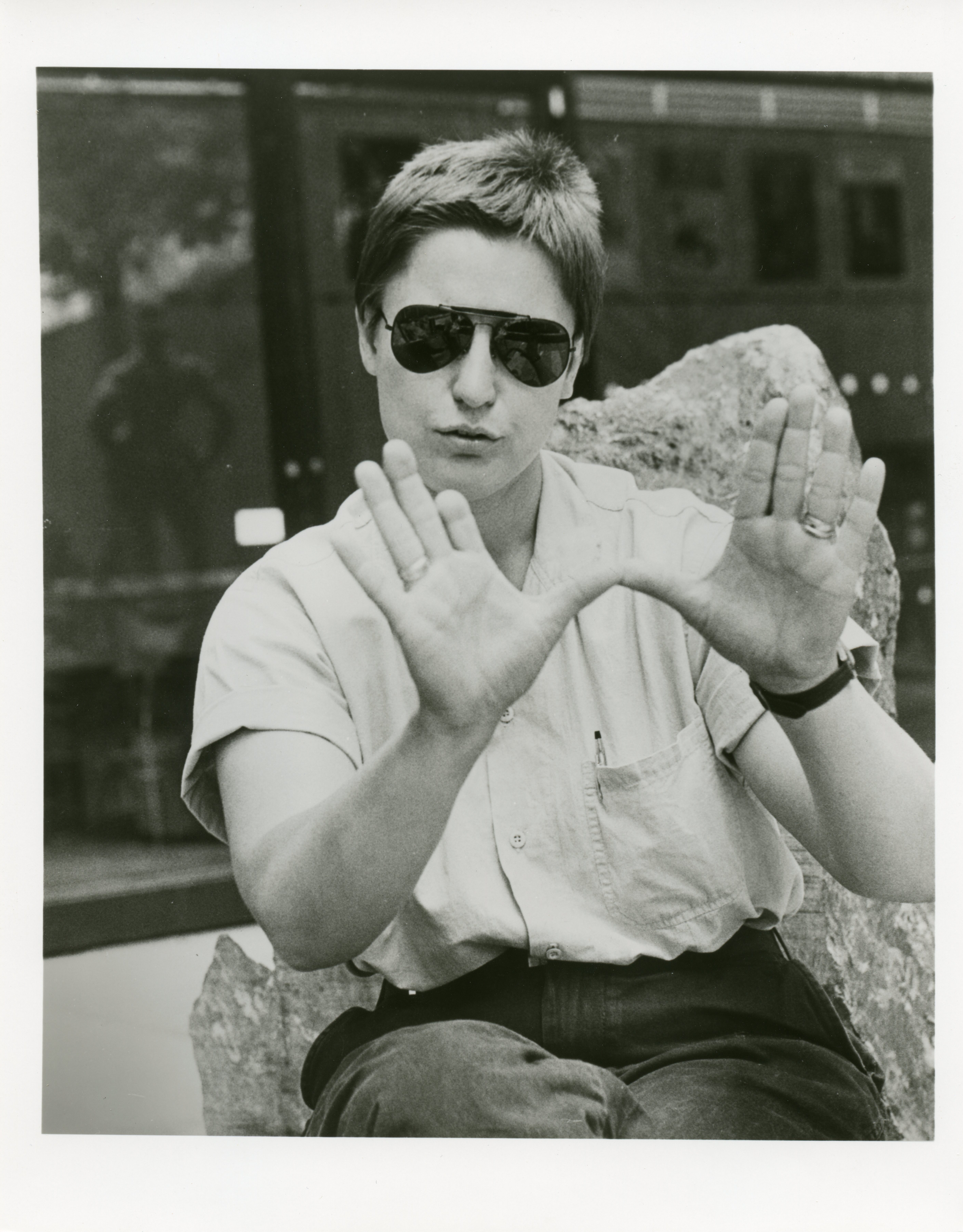
- Born: April 20, 1947 (age 79); Gary, Indiana
- Occupations: Avant-garde playwright, visual artist, multimedia set and lighting designer, activist
- Years active: 1973–present
- Spouse: Claudia Bruce

Linda Mussmann (born April 20, 1947) is an American avant-garde playwright, visual artist, a multimedia set and lighting designer, and an activist whose multi-disciplinary work has addressed problems of representation and language using elements of theater, movement and music. Mussmann is the founder of Time Space Limited Theater Inc., a theater company and performance space.

Mussmann directed and adapted over 30 classic plays. Since 1978, Mussmann has been writing her own performance works and adapted from literature for theater and radio. Mussmann currently lives in Hudson, NY. She is the co-director of Time and Space Limited, (TSL) with Claudia Bruce, her wife and lifelong collaborator. Since 2017, Mussmann holds an elected position as the Fourth Ward Supervisor for Columbia County, NY.

== Early life ==
Mussmann was born in Gary, Indiana, one of America's industrial centers, to Harold and Hilda Mussmann, third generation German-Americans farmers. Mussmann grew up on the family farm until the age of 18 when she left to attend Purdue University.

== Career ==
Mussmann began her work in the theater while a student at Purdue University (1965–1969) where she became the recipient of The Stewart Scholarship for Outstanding Theater Achievement and The Purdue University Outstanding Director Award. During the Summer of 1968, Mussmann studied in Chicago at the Hull House Theater (formerly the settlement house created by Jane Adams.)

Linda Mussmann has been described as a contemporary artist in the Gertrude Stein tradition.." Her texts involve elaborate wordplay and free associations. She has rejected narrative line and subverted dramatic structure to express a concern with problems of representation and perspective. Her work has addressed the problem of meaning, speaking words, perception and intention. Her multi-media projects utilize 8mm films, audio and video tapes, overhead projections, and special lighting designs in site-specific installations.

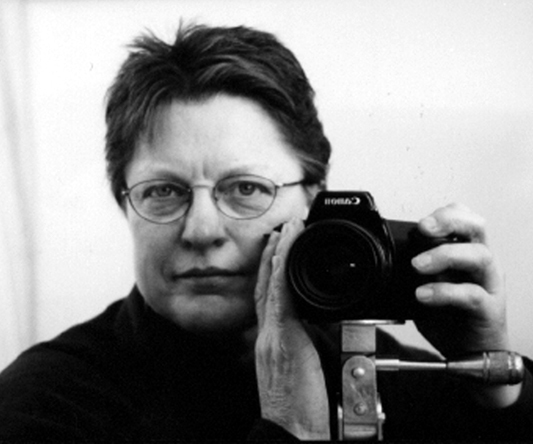
Mussmann holding a camera in 1980

In 1973, Musmann founded Time & Space Limited and became a director in residence at the Universalist Church, on 76th Street. Three years later she was joined by the artist Claudia Bruce with whom she began a life-long collaboration.

Between 1987 and 1989, Mussmann wrote the six-part Civil War Chronicles (If Kansas Goes, Blue Scene Grey, Cross Way Cross, Mary Surratt, Go Between Gettysburg, Lincoln Speak) in collaboration with composer Semih Firincioglu and Bruce as the lead performer and choreographer. The Civil War Chronicles were produced in New York City at Marymount Theater, Merce Cunningham's Dance Space, The Whitney Museum, Cooper Union, The Theatre at The Riverside Church, all in NYC. In 1988, Women and Performance: A Journal of Feminist Theory published an academic analysis of the Civil War Chronicles and the script of Cross Way Cross.

Mussman has been the recipient of grants from the Japan United States Friendship Commission, the former Goethe House now Goethe Institut, the New York Foundation for the Arts, Westdeutscher Rundfunk, The Whitney Museum of American Art (Equitable Center and Philip Morris). She has been resident director at the Universalist Church, the Manhattan Theater Club and La Mama.

In 1991 Time & Space Limited refused a grant from the National Endowment for the Arts that mandated an anti-obscenity pledge. That event, combined with the rising costs in NYC, led the organization to relocate Time & Space Limited, to Hudson, NY, where Mussmann and Bruce are the co-directors of TSL.

== Radio ==
Documentaries

- 1998, "Time To Talk: A Conversation with James G. Snead Jr.", WAMC Public Radio, Albany NY
- 1997, "Time To Talk: A Conversation with James G. Snead Jr.", Sender Freies, Berlin, Germany

Dramas

- Radio Play for: Sender Freies Berlin & Bayerischer Rundfunk, Munich & Südwestfunk, Baden-Baden
- 1990, Danton's Death (George Büchner), WDR Radio, Cologne, Germany
- 1992, Grief Has Taught Us Nothing, WDR Radio, Cologne, Germany
- 1994, Lenz (George Büchner), WDR Radio, Cologne, Germany
