= Daniel Chávez (Bolivian footballer) =

Bolivian footballer (born 1990)

Personal information
- Full name: Daniel Chávez Betancourt
- Date of birth: 13 January 1990 (age 36)
- Place of birth: La Paz, Bolivia
- Height: 1.79 m (5 ft 10 in)
- Position: Left winger

Senior career*
Years	Team	Apps	(Gls)
2011–2012	La Paz	42	(11)
2012–2016	The Strongest	102	(6)
2016–2017	Always Ready		

International career
2013–2014	Bolivia	4	(0)
- * Club domestic league appearances and goals

Daniel Chávez (born 13 January 1990 in La Paz) is a Bolivian footballer who plays as a midfielder or winger.
