= Susana Saxlund =

Uruguayan swimmer

Personal information
- Born: 20 March 1957 (age 69)

Sport
- Sport: Swimming

Susana Saxlund (born 20 March 1957) is a Uruguayan former swimmer. She competed in two events at the 1972 Summer Olympics.
