= Jean-Pierre Grimaud =

French rower

Personal information
- Nationality: French
- Born: 23 March 1944 (age 81)

Sport
- Sport: Rowing

Jean-Pierre Grimaud (born 23 March 1944) is a French rower. He competed at the 1964 Summer Olympics and the 1968 Summer Olympics.
