= Leif Andersson (Finnish rower) =

Finnish rower

Personal information
- Nationality: Finnish
- Born: 27 December 1944 (age 80); Porvoo, Finland

Sport
- Sport: Rowing

Leif Andersson (born 27 December 1944) is a Finnish rower. He competed in the men's coxed pair event at the 1972 Summer Olympics.
