= Šljivoševci =

- Village (Selo)
- Location within Osijek-Baranja County Location within Croatia Location within Europe
- Country: Croatia
- County: Osijek-Baranja County
- Municipality: Magadenovac

Area
  - Total: 10.5 km^{2} (4.1 sq mi)

Population (2021)
  - Total: 276
  - Density: 26.3/km^{2} (68.1/sq mi)
- Time zone: UTC+1 (CET)
  - Summer (DST): UTC+2 (CEST)

Šljivoševci is a village in Croatia.

== Name ==
The name of the village in Croatian is plural.
