= Dimitar Yanakiev =

Bulgarian rower (born 1950)

Personal information
- Nationality: Bulgarian
- Born: 26 May 1950 (age 76) Trayanovo, Bulgaria

Sport
- Sport: Rowing
Medal record
Men's rowing
Representing Bulgaria
World Rowing Championships
Gold medal – first place	1977 Amsterdam	Coxed pair

Dimitar Yanakiev (Bulgarian: Димитър Янакиев, born 26 May 1950) is a Bulgarian former rower. He competed at the 1972 Summer Olympics, 1976 Summer Olympics and the 1980 Summer Olympics.
