= Thor Egil Olsen =

Norwegian rower

Personal information
- Nationality: Norwegian
- Born: 15 April 1957 (age 67); Drammen, Norway

Sport
- Sport: Rowing

Thor Egil Olsen (born 15 April 1957) is a Norwegian coxswain. He competed in the men's coxed pair event at the 1972 Summer Olympics.
