= Daniel Chávez (rower) =

Mexican rower (born 1946)

Personal information
- Born: 20 January 1946 (age 79); Jalisco, Mexico

Sport
- Sport: Rowing

Daniel Chávez (born 20 January 1946) is a Mexican rower. He competed in the men's coxed four event at the 1968 Summer Olympics.
