= André Sloth =

French rower

Personal information
- Nationality: French
- Born: 20 May 1944 (age 80)

Sport
- Sport: Rowing

André Sloth (born 20 May 1944) is a French rower. He competed at the 1964 Summer Olympics and the 1968 Summer Olympics.
