= Klaus Jacob (rower) =

East German rower

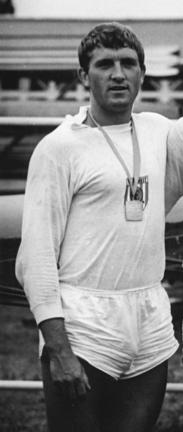
- Klaus Jacob in 1969

Personal information
- Born: 20 April 1943 (age 83) Aussig, Germany

Sport
- Sport: Rowing
- Club: SC Einheit Dresden
Medal record
Men's rowing
Representing East Germany
Olympic Games
Silver medal – second place	1968 Mexico City	Coxed four

Klaus Jacob (born 20 April 1943) is a German rower who competed for East Germany in the 1968 Summer Olympics.

He was born in Aussig in 1943; this became part of Czechoslovakia after WWII. In 1968 he was a crew member of the East German boat which won the silver medal in the coxed four event.
