= Aleksey Mishin (rower) =

Soviet rower

Personal information
- Born: 17 April 1941 (age 83); Krasnodar, Russian SFSR, Soviet Union
- Height: 192 cm (6 ft 4 in)
- Weight: 92 kg (203 lb)

Sport
- Sport: Rowing

Aleksey Mishin (Russian name: Алексей Мишин; born 17 April 1941) is a Soviet rower from Russia. He competed at the 1968 Summer Olympics in Mexico City with the men's coxed four where they came sixth.
