= Nenko Dobrev =

Bulgarian coxswain

Personal information
- Nationality: Bulgarian
- Born: 21 December 1946 (age 79) Plovdiv, Bulgaria
- Height: 158 cm (5 ft 2 in)
- Weight: 45 kg (99 lb)

Sport
- Sport: Rowing
- Club: CSKA Sofia
Medal record
Men's rowing
Representing Bulgaria
World Rowing Championships
Bronze medal – third place	1977 Amsterdam	Coxed four
Bronze medal – third place	1978 Karapiro	Coxed four

Nenko Dobrev (Bulgarian: Ненко Добрев, born 21 December 1946) is a Bulgarian rowing coxswain. He competed at the 1972 Summer Olympics, 1976 Summer Olympics and the 1980 Summer Olympics.
