= Siro Meli =

Italian rower (1946–2018)

Personal information
- Nationality: Italian
- Born: 10 October 1946; Cabras, Italy
- Died: 4 September 2018 (aged 71)

Sport
- Sport: Rowing

Siro Meli (10 October 1946 – 4 September 2018) was an Italian rower. He competed at the 1972 Summer Olympics and the 1984 Summer Olympics.
