= Oldřich Svojanovský =

Czech rower (1946–2026)

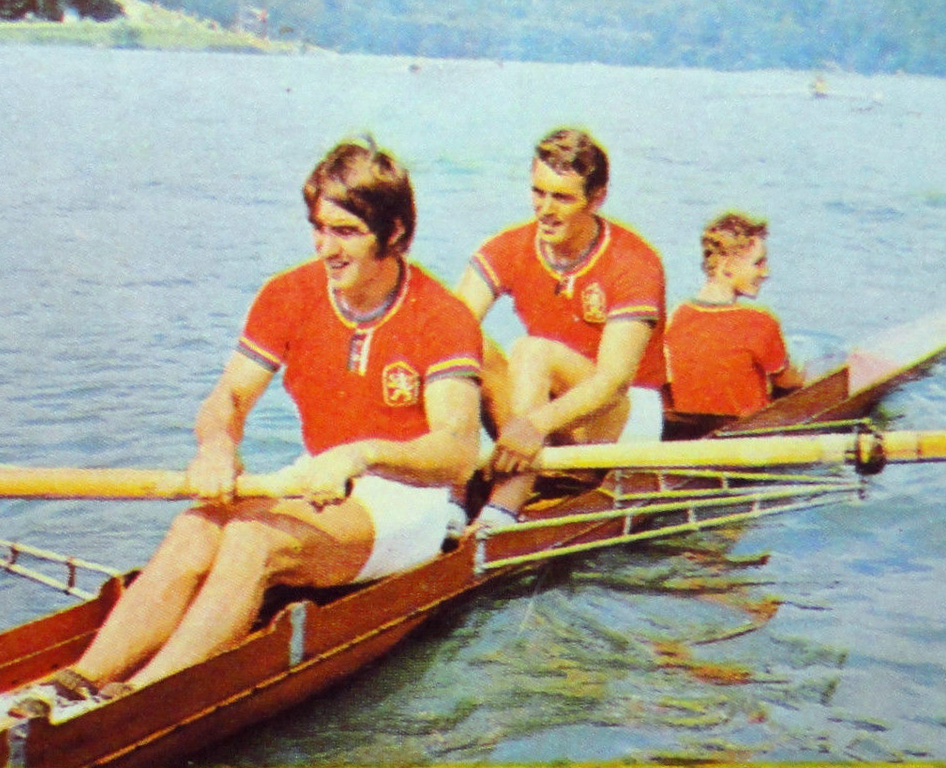
- Svojanovský brothers at the 1972 Olympics

Personal information
- Born: 9 March 1946 Otrokovice, Czechoslovakia
- Died: 11 November 2026 (aged 80)
- Height: 187 cm (6 ft 2 in)
- Weight: 94 kg (207 lb)

Sport
- Sport: Rowing
Medal record
Representing Czechoslovakia
Olympic Games
Silver medal – second place	1972 Munich	Coxed pair
Bronze medal – third place	1976 Montreal	Coxed pair
World Rowing Championships
Bronze medal – third place	1974 Lucerne	Coxed pair
European Rowing Championships
Gold medal – first place	1969 Klagenfurt	Coxed pair
Silver medal – second place	1971 Copenhagen	Coxed pair

Oldřich Svojanovský (9 March 1946 – 11 November 2026) was a Czech rower who mostly competed in the coxed pairs, together with his elder brother Pavel Svojanovský. With different coxswains they won two Olympic (1972 and 1976), one world (1974) and two European championship medals (1969 and 1971). They also placed fifth in the eights at the 1968 Olympics.

Svojanovský died on 11 November 2026, at the age of 80.
