= Jorge Buenahora =

Uruguayan rower (born 1950)

Personal information
- Nationality: Uruguayan
- Born: 29 April 1950 (age 75)

Sport
- Sport: Rowing

Jorge Buenahora (born 29 April 1950) is a Uruguayan rower. He competed in the men's coxed pair event at the 1972 Summer Olympics.
