= Lázaro Rivero =

Cuban rower

Personal information
- Nationality: Cuban
- Born: 17 December 1946 (age 78)

Sport
- Sport: Rowing

Lázaro Rivero (born 17 December 1946) is a Cuban rower. He competed at the 1968 Summer Olympics and the 1972 Summer Olympics.
