= Luther Jones =

American rower (born 1948)

Personal information
- Full name: Luther H Jones III
- Nationality: American
- Born: October 29, 1948 (age 77) Pocatello, Idaho, U.S.

Sport
- Sport: Rowing

Luther Jones (born October 29, 1948) is an American rower. He competed at the 1968 Summer Olympics and the 1972 Summer Olympics.
