= Herman Zaanen =

Dutch rower

Personal information
- Born: 15 March 1948 (age 78) Rotterdam, the Netherlands
- Height: 1.69 m (5 ft 7 in)
- Weight: 50 kg (110 lb)

Sport
- Sport: Rowing
- Club: Proteus-Eretes, Delft

Herman Adriaan Zaanen (born 15 March 1948) is a retired Dutch coxswain. He competed at the 1972 Summer Olympics in the coxed pairs, together with René Kieft and Bernard Luttikhuizen, but failed to reach the final.
