= Grand Challenge Cup =

Rowing competition at the Henley Royal Regatta

- Venue: Henley Royal Regatta, River Thames
- Location: Henley-on-Thames, Oxfordshire
- Dates: 1839 – present

The Grand Challenge Cup is a rowing competition for men's eights. It is the oldest and best-known event at the annual Henley Royal Regatta on the River Thames at Henley-on-Thames in England. It is open to male crews from all eligible rowing clubs. Two or more clubs may combine to make an entry.

The event dates from 1839 and was originally called the "Henley Grand Challenge Cup". The Stewards resolved that a silver cup, for which they incurred 100 guineas, (Note: The amount paid was after the withdrawal of the guinea, a gold coin, in 1816 and is nominally equivalent to £9,418 in 2025 (auto-updates).) was to be competed for annually by amateur crews in eight-oared boats. One of the prize medals awarded at the first race was donated to the regatta in 1969 and is on display in the Prize Tent.

The cup has since been competed for annually save for the years affected by the two World Wars and the COVID-19 pandemic. The eligibility rules have varied over the years, but the premise that the cup has always been open to all established crews has remained at its core. Subject to rowing together long enough, F.I.S.A. national crew members may enter for this event. In its history the Cup has been won by foreign crews 47 times – 14 times by crews from Germany, 11 from the US, 9 from the former USSR, 4 times each by crews from Australia and Canada, 3 times by Belgian crews, twice by a Dutch crew and once each by crews from Bulgaria, Croatia, France and Switzerland. The Leander Club hold the record of 36 wins.

The cup itself records the names of all winning crews since 1839. The base was added in 1896 and extended in 1954 and again in 1986. The Book of Honour was added as an integral part of the trophy in 1954. In 1964, the winning Harvard crew of 1914 presented the regatta with a new cup, identical to the original of 1839, which is now very fragile. This new cup continues to be used as the trophy presented to the winning crew for lifting and photographs on finals day, with medals as in all other events being awarded permanently to winners.

The current Henley course record is 5:53 set by the winning 2018 entry.

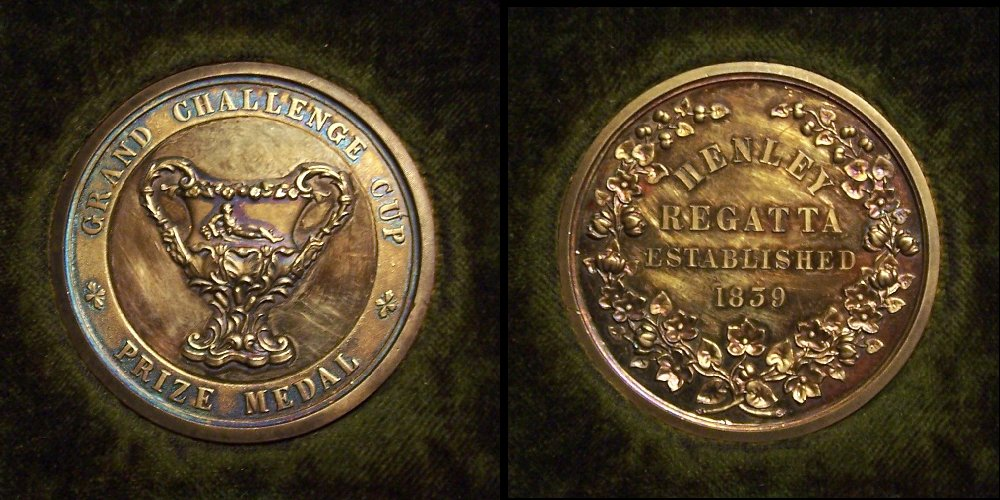
The Prize Medal of the 1937 Grand Challenge Cup

== Past winners ==
=== 1839–1849 ===
Year	Winner	Crew	Runner-up	Dist	ref
1839	First Trinity, Cm	W. R. Gough, W. W. Smyth, S. B. T. Taylor, J. G. Lonsdale, C. Penrose, C. W. Strickland, W. A. Cross, W. Massey (stroke), H. D. Barclay (cox)	Oxford Etonian Club	1/2l	
1840	Leander Club	E. Shepheard, W. Wood, S. Wallace, J. Layton, T.L Jenkins, O. Ommanney, C. Pollock, A. Dalgleish (stroke), H. Gibson (cox)	Trinity College	4l	
1841	Cambridge Subscription Rooms, London	Hon. G. Denman, A. H. Shadwell, W. A. Cross, T. A. Anson, W. H. Yatman, W. M. Jones, C. M. Vialls, W. B. Brett (stroke), T. S. Egan (cox)	Leander Club	foul	
1842	Cambridge Subscription Rooms, London	W. H. Yatman, A. H. Shadwell, G. C. Uppleby, J. G. Lonsdale, A. S. Ritchie, W. M. Jones, C. J. Selwyn, J. Beresford, (stroke), T. S. Egan (cox)	Cambridge Univ BC	ft	
1843	Oxford Univ BC	R. Menzies, E. Royds, W. B. Brewster, G. D. Bourne, J. C. Cox, R. Lowndes, G. E. Hughes (st), A. T. W. Shadwell (cox)	Cambridge Subscription Rooms	1l	
1844	Oxford Etonian Club	W. Chetwynd-Stapylton, W. Spottiswoode, H. Chetwynd-Stapylton, J. Spankie, F. S. Wilson, F. E. Tuke, J. W. Conant, H. Morgan (stroke), A. T. W. Shadwell (cox)	Caius College	3l	
1845	Cambridge Univ BC	G. Mann, W. Harkness, W. S. Lockhart, W. P. Cloves, F.L Hopkins, H. J. Potts, F. M. Arnold, C. G. Hill (stroke), H. Munster (cox)	Oxford University	2l	
1846	Thames Club	F. W. Blake, W. Field, E. G. Peacock, E. Webb, J. S. Robinson, F Playford, L D. Strutton, J. R.L Walmisley (stroke), G. Walmisley (cox)	First Trinity	3-4l	
1847	Oxford Univ BC	E. G. Moon, M. Haggard, J. Oldham, F. C. Royds, E. G. C. Griffiths, W. King, G. R. Winter, E. C. Burton (stroke), C. J. Soanes (cox)	Thames Club	3l	
1848	Oxford Univ BC]	W. G. Rich, M. Haggard, E. J. Sykes, F. C. Royds, G. R. Winter, A. Mansfield, W. H. Milman, E. C. Burton (stroke), C. J. Soanes (cox)	Thames Club	e	
1849	St John of Malta (Wadham)	O. Ogle, J. Semple, A. Sugden, E. Johnson, W. H. Humphrey, J. E. Clarke, H. Hodgson, D. Wauchope (st)., C. Ranken (cox)	Second Trinity	f	

=== 1850–1899 ===
Year	Winner	Crew	Runner-up	Dist	ref
1850	Oxford Univ BC	H. J. Cheales, W. Houghton, J. J. Hornby, J. Aitken, C. H. Steward, J. W. Chitty, E. J. Sykes, W. G. Rich (stroke), R. W. Cotton (cox)	(no Cambridge crews entered)	ro	
1851	Oxford Univ BC	W. G. Rich, W. Nixon, J. J. Hornby, W. Houghton, J. Aitken, R. Greenall, E. J. Sykes, J. W. Chitty (stroke), E. C. Burton (cox)	Cambridge Univ BC	6l	
1852	Oxford Univ BC	W. F. Short, H. Blundell, H. S. Polehampton, W. H. Coventry, H. Denne, C. Stephens, H. R. Barker, R. Greenall (stroke), F. Balguy (cox)	Oxford Aquatic Club		
1853	Oxford Univ BC	W. F. Short, P. H. Moore, W. King, R. J. Buller, H. Denne, P. H. Nind, K. Prescot, W. O. Meade-King (stroke), T. H. Marshall (cox)	Cambridge Univ BC	18i	
1854	First Trinity, Cm	Hon. G. Pepys, J. S. Wood, R. D. Marshall, E. C. Graham, E. Courage, E Macnaghton, R. C. Galton, H. R. Mansel Jones (stroke), W. Wingfield (cox)	Wadham College	2l	
1855	Cambridge Univ BC	P. P. Pearson, E. C. Graham, H. W. Schreiber, E. H. Fairrie, H. Williams, H. F. Johnson, H. Blake, H. R. Mansel Jones (stroke), W. Wingfield (cox)	Oxford University	2 1/2l	
1856	Royal Chester RC	P. Maudsley, T. Grindrod, J. Fairrie, E. B. Gibson, E. Dixon, F. French, J. Elsee, J. B. Littledale (stroke), A. Brittain (cox)	Lady Margaret	e	
1857	London Rowing Club	J. Ireland, F. Potter, C. Schlotel, J. Nottidge, J. Paine, W. Farrar, A. A. Casamajor, H. H. Playford (stroke), H. Edie (cox)	Oxford University	1¼l	
1858	Cambridge Univ BC	G. A. Paley, A L Smith, W. J. Havart, D. Darroch, A. H. Fairbairn, R. Lewis-Lloyd, N. Royds, J. Hall (stroke), J. T.Morland (cox)	London Rowing Club	1/2l	
1859	London Rowing Club	G. Dunnage, W. Foster, F. Potter, W. M. Dunnage, W. Farrar, J. Paine, A. A. Casamajor, H. H. Playford (stroke), H. Weston (cox)	Cambridge Univ BC	¾l	
1860	First Trinity, Cm	G. H. Richards, G. Cox, H. S. Wright, D. Ingles, J. Lyle, T. E.Beaumont, S. Heathcote, N. Royds (stroke), J. T. Morland (cox)	London Rowing Club	3l	
1861	First Trinity, Cm	H. A. Ridgway, T. H. Crampton, H. S. Wright, A. M. Channell, B. P. Gregson, W. C. Smyly, J. G. Buchanan, G. H. Richards (st), J. C. Carter (cox)	Trinity College, Oxford	2 1/2l	
1862	London Rowing Club	H. Hood, W. Stout, G. P. R. Grubb, G. Ryan, C. Boydell, A. Hodgson, F. Fenner, G. R. Cox (stroke), E. Weston (cox)	Trinity College, Oxford	3l	
1863	Univ College, Ox	J. H. E. Smith, A. Brassey, J. E. Parker, J. M. Collyer, R. A. Seymour, A. E. Seymour, F. H. Kelly, J. H. Forster (stroke), W. Glaister (cox)	Brasenose College	2l	
1864	Kingston Rowing Club	C. C. Mowbray, G. F. Meynell, A. Wilson, E. A. Thurburn, W. Seymour, W. R. Griffiths, C. A. P. Talbot, G. Cardale (stroke), C. Walton (cox)	University College	1 1/2l	
1865	Kingston Rowing Club	C. C. Mowbray, G. F. Meynell, H. B. Middleton, F. Willan, W. Seymour, R. F. Wade, W. B. Woodgate, R. W. Risley (stroke), F. Walton (cox)	London Rowing Club	2 1/2l	
1866	Oxford Etonian Club	W. P. Bowman, C. S. Newton, W. P. Senhouse, R. G. Marsden, F. Willan, W. W. Wood, A. Brassey, A. H. Hall (stroke), C. R. W. Tottenham (cox)	Kingston Rowing Club	¼l	
1867	Oxford Etonian Club	M. G. Knight, C. S. Newton, W. P. Bowman, R. G. Marsden, J. C. Thine, W. W. Wood, F. Willan, A. H. Hall (stroke), C. R. W. Tottenham (cox)	London Rowing Club	1 1/2l	
1868	London Rowing Club	C. Warren, B. P. Scare, J. G. Walker, W. Cross, A. DeL Long, C. Ryan, S. Le B. Smith, F. S. Gulston (stroke), V. Weston(cox)	Eton College	1 1/2l	
1869	Oxford Etonian Club	W. Farrer, F. F. Armitstead, R. W. B. Mirehouse, A. G. P. Lewis, F. Willan, A. C. Yarborough, W. D. Benson, S. H. Woodhouse (stroke), E. E. Grubbe (cox)	London Rowing Club	2l	
1870	Oxford Etonian Club	W. Farrer, F. E. Armitstead, S. H. Woodhouse, A. G. P. Lewis, J. C. Tinne, A. C. Yarborough, R. W. B. Mirehouse, W. D. Benson (stroke), E. E. Grubbe (cox)	London Rowing Club	1¼l	
1871	Oxford Etonian Club	F. E. H. Elliot, W. Farrer, M. A. Farrer, J. W. McClintock Bunbury, J. Edwards-Moss, A. G. P. Lewis, S. H. Woodhouse, F. E. Armitstead (stroke), E. E. Grubbe (cox)	London Rowing Club	1 1/2l	
1872	London Rowing Club	S. Le B. Smith, C. E. Routh, C. S. Routh, B. P. Scare, R. M. Barton, John B. Close, A. DeL Long, F. S. Gulston (stroke), V. Weston (cox)	Kingston Rowing Club	6l	
1873	London Rowing Club	C. E. Routh, C. S. Routh, James B. Close, W. F. Pitchford, R. :Barton, John B. Close, A. DeL Long, F. S. Gulston (stroke), V. Weston (cox)	Eton College	3l	
1874	London Rowing Club	B. Horton, C. S. Routh, C. E. Routh, E. B. Parlour, A. DeL Long, F.L Playford, S. Le B. Smith, F. S. Gulston (stroke), V. Weston (cox)	Eton College	2/3l	
1875	Leander Club	P. J. Hibbert, W. Davy, E. A. Phillips, A. W. Nicholson, C. S. Read, H. E. Rhodes, C. W. Benson, J. H. D. Goldie (stroke), E. O. Hopwood (cox)	Molesey Boat Club	2l	
1876	Thames Rowing Club	R. H. Labat, J. Howell, G. C. Gordon, C. C. Cream, W.L Slater, J. A. :Robertson, W. H. Eyre, J. Hastie (stroke), E. A. Safford (cox)	Jesus College, Cm	1l	
1877	London Rowing Club	B. Horton, C. H. Warren, E. Slade, A. Trower, A. DeL Long, F. S. Gulston, S. Le B. Smith, F.L Playford, (stroke), W. F. Sheard (cox)	Thames Rowing Club	1¼l	
1878	Thames Rowing Club	J. C. Sutherland, J. G. Jones, E. C. Otter, B. J. Angle, G. H. Scales, W. Nottebohm, W. H. Eyre, J. Hastie (stroke), E. A. Stafford (cox)	Jesus College, Cm	2l	
1879	Jesus College, Cm	L R. Jones, W. W. Baillie, C. N. Armytage, C. Fairbairn, E. A. Phillips, C. Gurdon, T. E. Hockin, E. H. Prest (stroke), R. Williams (cox)	Kingston Harbor Boat Club	e	
1880	Leander Club	R. H. Poole, L R. West, F. H. Capron, H. Sandford, J. H. T. Wharton, H. B. Southwell, T. C. Edwards-Moss, W. A. Ellison (stroke), G.L Davis (cox)	London Rowing Club	1 1/2l	
1881	London Rowing Club	P. Adcock, W. A. D. Evanson, C G. Ousey, W. W. Hewitt, H. Butler, W. R. Grove, H. H. Playford, jun., F.L Playford (stroke), W. F. Sheard (cox)	Leander Club	1l	
1882	Exeter College, Ox	W. C. Blandy, L Stock, J. A. G. Bengough, A. B. How, H. H. Walrond, R. A. Pinckney, R. S. Kindersley, W. D. B. Curry (stroke), A. B. Roxburgh (cox)	Thames Rowing Club	5l	
1883	London Rowing Club	G. R. B. Earnshaw, C. E. Earnshaw, W. Bergh, A. S. J. Hurrell, C. G. Ousey, W. R. Grove, J. T. Crier, W. W. Hewitt (stroke), W. F. Sheard (cox)	Twickenham	1+l	
1884	London Rowing Club	G. R. B. Earnshaw, C. E. Earnshaw, W, Bergh, J. F. Stilwell, H. J. Hill, A. S. J. Hurrell, J. T. Crier, W. W. Hewitt (stroke), W. F. Sheard (cox)	Twickenham	3l	
1885	Jesus College, Cm	H. S. Sanford, L P. Bevan, H. Armitage, E. P. Alexander, J. W. Dickson, A. M. Hutchinson, S. Fairbairn, C. H. Bicknell (stroke), C. E. Tyndale-Biscoe (cox)	Twickenham	2l	
1886	Trinity Hall, Cm	R. McKenna, L Hannen, W. A. D. Bell, P. Landale, J. Walmsley, S. Swann, A. R. Sladen, C. J. Bristowe (stroke), A. G. Salvin (cox)	Etonian Club	1/2l	
1887	Trinity Hall, Cm	A. R. Sladen, L Hannen, A. Bousfield, C. B. P. Bell, J. Walmsley, S. Swann, P. Landale, C. J. Bristowe (stroke), J. R. Roxburgh (cox)	Thames Rowing Club	4 ft	
1888	Thames Rowing Club	B. W. Looker J. W. Fogg- Elliot, P. S. G. Propert, A. S. Falconer, W. Broughton, A. M. Hutchinson, F. E. C. Clark, J. A. Drake-Smith (stroke), E. A. Safford (cox)	Leander Club	¾l	
1889	Thames Rowing Club	B. W. Looker, B. E. Cole, P. S. G. Propert, A. S. Falconer, W. Broughton, A. M. Hutchinson, F. E. C. Clark, J. Drake-Smith (stroke), E. A. Safford (cox)	New College	1l	
1890	London Rowing Club	M. W. Mossop, H. W. Reeves, T. E. Coulson, J. Baker, A. G. Aldous, R. S. Farren, R. S. Bradshaw, G. B. James (stroke), W. F. Sheard (cox)	Brasenose College	1¾l	
1891	Leander Club	W. F. C. Holland, J. A. Ford, V. Nickalls, Lord Ampthill, G Nickalls, W A L Fletcher, R. P. P. Rowe, C. W. Kent (stroke), L S. Williams (cox)	London Rowing Club	1l	
1892	Leander Club	H. B. Cotton, J. A. Ford, W. A. Hewett, C. M. Pitman, G Nickalls, W A L Fletcher, R. P. P. Rowe, C. W. Kent (stroke), J. P. Heywood-Lonsdale (cox)	Thames Rowing Club	3l	
1893	Leander Club	W. F. C. Holland, T. G. Lewis, C. T. Fogg-Elliott, J. A. Ford, W. B. Stewart, W A L Fletcher, R. O. Kerrison, C. W. Kent (stroke), L S. Williams (cox)	London Rowing Club	1¾l	
1894	Leander Club	H. B. Cotton, J. A. Ford, M. C. Pilkington, C. M. Pitman, W. B. Stewart, J. A. Morrison, W. E. Crum, C. W. Kent (stroke), D. Powell (cox)	Thames Rowing Club	1/2l	
1895	Trinity Hall, Cm	T. B. Hope, J. A. Bott, W. J. Fernie, F. C. Stewart, W. A. Bieber, B. H. Howell, A. S. Bell, D. A. Wauchope (stroke), T. R. Paget-Tomlinson (cox)	New College	1/3l	
1896	Leander Club	C. W. N. Graham, J. A. Ford, H. Willis, R. Carr, T. H. E. Stretch, G Nickalls, W. F. C. Holland, H. G. Gold (stroke), H. R. K. Petchell (cox)	Thames Rowing Club	2¼l	
1897	New College, Oxford	J. J. de Knoop, G. O. Edwards, R. O. Pitman, A. O. Dowson, C. K. Philips, H. Thorpe, W, E, Crum, H. Whitworth (stroke), C. P. Serocold (cox)	Leander Club	2 ft	
1898	Leander Club	H. A. Steward, W. B. Rennie, J. A. Tinne, H. A. Game, C D Burnell, H. Willis, C J D Goldie, H. G. Gold (stroke), H. R. K. Petchell (cox)	First Trinity, Cm	¾l	
1899	Leander Club	R. O. Pitman, E. A. Beresford-Peirse, H. W. M. Willis, H. A. Game, C D Burnell, R. Carr, C. K. Philips, H. G. Gold (stroke), G S Maclagan (cox)	London Rowing Club	1¼l	

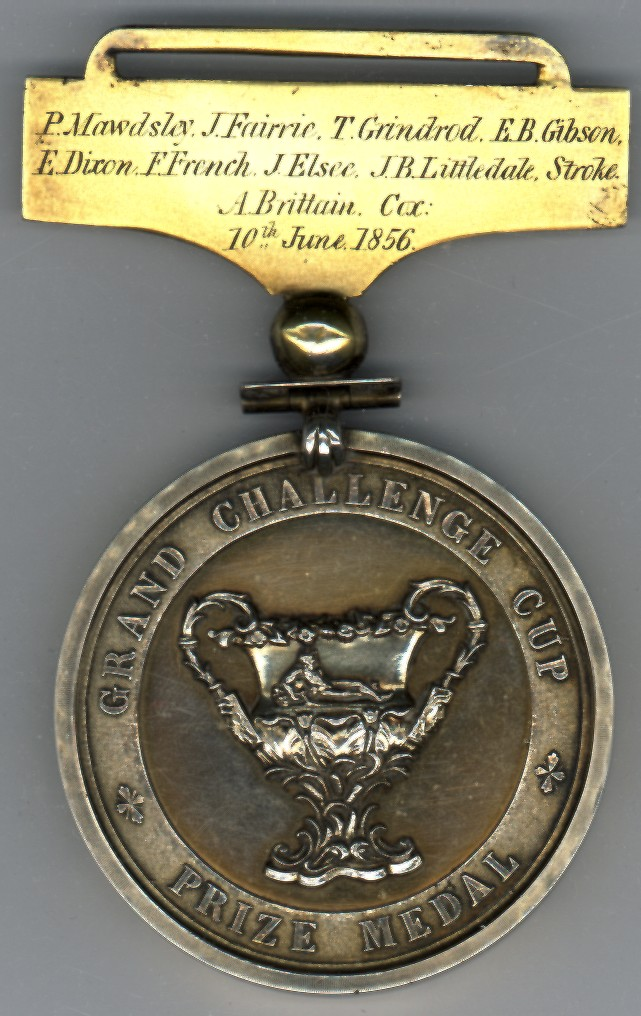
E.B. Gibson's medal for winning the Grand Challenge Cup at the Henley Regatta with Royal Chester in 1856

=== 1900–1914 ===
Year	Winner	Crew	Runner-up	Dist	ref
1900	Leander Club	R. O. Pitman, H. U. Gould, Viscount Grimston, F. W. Warre, C D Burnell, J. E. Payne, M, C. Thornhill, F. O. J. Huntley (stroke), G S Maclagan (cox)	Trinity College	1/2l	
1901	Leander Club	C. A. Willis, H. J. du Vallon, W Dudley Ward, G. M. Maitland, C D Burnell, J. E. Payne, C J D Goldie, R. B. Etherington-Smith (stroke), G S Maclagan (cox)	Univ Of Pennsylvania, USA	1l	
1902	Third Trinity, Cm	W. H. Chapman, V. P. Powell, C J D Goldie, P. H. Thomas, J. Edwards-Moss, C W H Taylor, W Dudley Ward, J. H. Gibbon (stroke), W. H. Brown (cox)	Leander Club	1 1/2l	
1903	Leander Club	H. Sanger, T. Drysdale, B. C. Cox, F. S. Kelly, R. B. Etherington-Smith, F. W. Warre, F. J. Escombe, A. K. Graham (stroke), G S Maclagan (cox)	Third Trinity, Cm	6 ft	
1904	Leander Club	W. H. Chapman, F. S. Kelly, B. C. Johnstone, C W H Taylor, F. J. Escombe, P. H. Thomas, A. K. Graham, R H Nelson (stroke), G S Maclagan (cox)	New College BC	1l	
1905	Leander Club	A. K. Graham, F. S. Kelly, B. C. Johnstone, G. Nickalls, F. J. Escombe, P. H. Thomas, R. B. Etherington-Smith, R H Nelson (stroke), G S Maclagan (cox)	Royal Club Nautique de Gand	2¼l	
1906	Royal Club Nautique de Gand	Urbain Molmans, Albert Heye, Alphonse Van Roy, Guillaume Visser, Max Orban, Rémy Orban, O. de Somville, Rodolphe Poma (stroke), Raphael Van der Waerden (cox)	Trinity Hall, Cm	3l	
1907	Royal Sport Nautique de Gand	P. de Geyter, Guillaume Visser, U. Molmans, A. Van Roy, F. Vergucht, P. Veirman, O. de Somville, Rodolphe Poma (stroke), R. Colpaert (cox)	Christ Church, Oxford	1l	
1908	Christ Church, Ox	A. G. B. Cherry-Garrard, W. A. Akers, F. E. Villiers, A. C. Gladstone, G. E. Hope, E. Majolier, H. R. Barker, C. A. Gladstone (str.), A. St. J. M. Kekewich (cox)	Eton College	1 1/2l	
1909	Royal Club Nautique de Gand	U. Molmans, Guillaume Visser, St. Kowalski, Rémy Orban, F. Vergucht, P. Veirman, O. de Somville, M. M. R. Poma (str.), A. Vanlandeghem (cox)	Jesus College, Cm	1l	
1910	Magdalen College, Ox	M. M. Cudmore, L. G. Wormald, J. H. E. V. Millington-Drake, W. D. Nicholson, D. Mackinnon, A. S. Garton, E. R. Burgess, P. Fleming(str.), A. W. F. Donkin (cox)	Jesus College, Cm	2l	
1911	Magdalen College, Ox	E. R. Burgess, C. Bailieu, L. G. Wormald, J. A. Gillan, D. Mackinnon, A. S. Garton, A. G. Kirby, P. Fleming (str.), H. B. Wells (cox)	Jesus College, Cm	2¼l	
1912	Sydney Rowing Club	J. A. Ryrie, S. Fraser, K. Heritage, T. Parker, H. Hauenstein, S. A. Middleton, H. Ross-Soden, R. B. Fitzhardinge (str.), R. G. K. Waley (cox)	Leander Club	¾l	
1913	Leander Club	A. C. Gladstone, S. E.Swann, L. G. Wormald, E. D. Horsfall, C. S. Clark, A. S. Garton, F. F. V. Scrutton, G. E. Tower (str.), H. B. Wells (cox)	Jesus College, Cm	1l	
1914	Harvard University, USA	L. Saltonstall, J. Talcott, H. H. Meyer, H. S. Middendorf, J. W. Middendorf, D. P. Morgan, L. Curtis, C. C. Lund (str.), H. Kreger (cox)	Union Boat Club, USA	1¼l	
1915–1919 no races (WWI)

==== Gallery ====
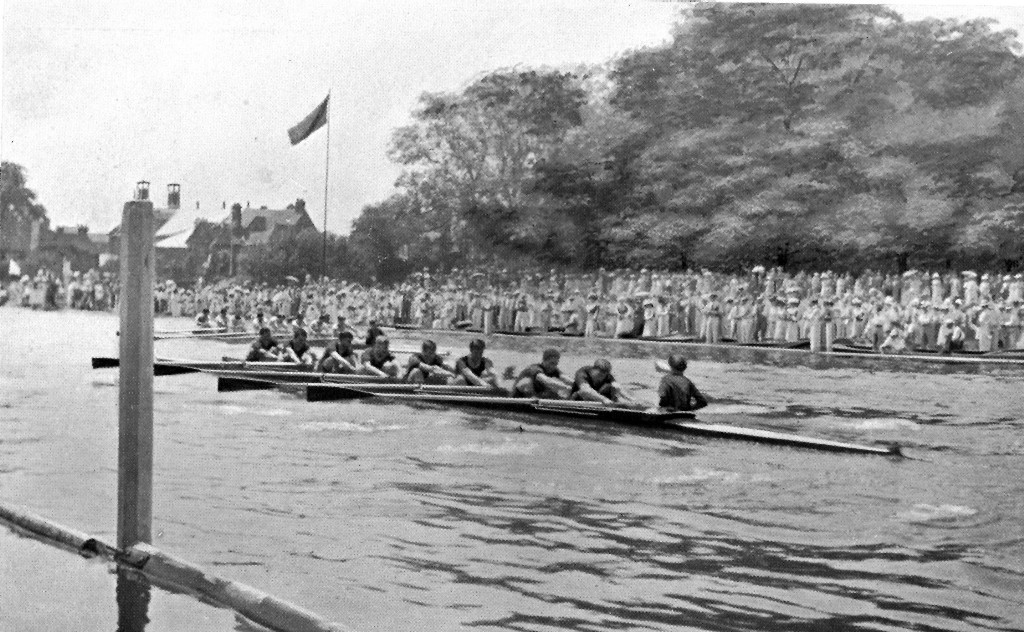
Leander defeat University of Pennsylvania in the Grand Challenge Cup final on 5 July 1901, in a race described as 'something wonderful'.

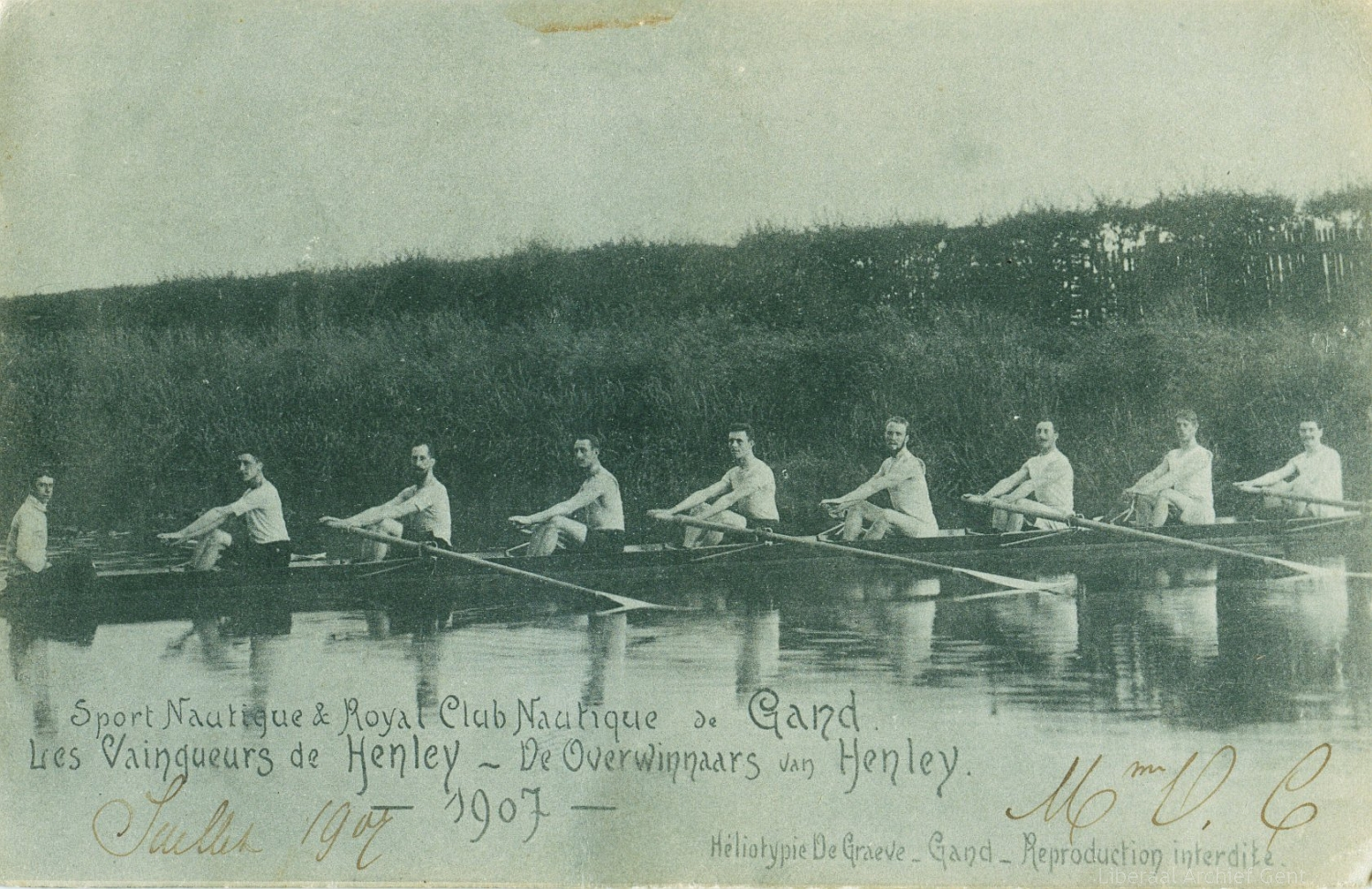
Royal Sport Nautique de Gand, winners in 1907

=== 1920–1939 ===
Year	Winner	Crew	Runner-up	Dist	ref
1920	Magdalen College, Ox	H. C. Irvine (bow), Hon. B. L. Bathurst, S. Earl, A. T. M. Durand, W. E. C. James, R. S. C. Lucas, G. O. Nickalls, E. D. Horsfall (str.), W. H. Porritt (cox)	Leander Club	2l	
1921	Magdalen College, Ox	H. C. Irvine (bow), R. Armstrong-Jones, S. Earl, A. T. M. Durand, W. E. C. James, R. S. C. Lucas, G. O. Nickalls, E. D. Horsfall (str.), W. H. Porritt (cox)	Jesus College, Cm	1l	
1922	Leander Club	P. H. G. H.-S. Hartley (bow), H. O. C. Boret, G. O. Nickalls, D. T. Raikes, A. B. Ritchie, R. S. C. Lucas, Hon. J. W. H. Fremantle, E. D. Horsfall (str.), W. H. Porritt (cox)	Thames Rowing Club	1l	
1923	Thames Rowing Club	C. G. Chandler, R. G. Bare, J. Beresford Jnr., C. H. Rew, A. F. Long, K. C. Wilson, H. L. Holman, S. I. Fairbairn, J. Godwin (cox)	Pembroke College, Cm	1/3l	
1924	Leander Club	D.C. Bennett, G. Milling, H.O.C. Boret, J.E. Pedder, H.R. Carver, R. S. C. Lucas, G. O. Nickalls, W.P. Mellen, R.T. Johnstone (cox)	Jesus College, Cm	6 ft	
1925	Leander Club	G. Milling, H.O.C. Boret, S.K.N. Craig, A.D.B. Pearson, H.B. Playford, R. S. C. Lucas, G. O. Nickalls, W.P. Mellen, G.D. Clapperton (cox)	Thames Rowing Club	¼l	
1926	Leander Club	G.E.G. Gadsden, C.R.M. Eley, K.N. Craig, H.O.C. Boret, H.R. Carver, A.D.B. Pearson, G.O.Nickalls, T.D.A.Collet, G.D.Clapperton (cox)	Lady Margaret	2l	
1927	Thames Rowing Club	H.E. West, G.D. Smith, D. Wheeler, H.M. Lane, D.H.L. Gollan, J.C. Badcock, G.C. Killick, J. Hamilton, J. Godwin (cox)	London Rowing Club	¾l	
1928	Thames Rowing Club	J. Hamilton, G.O. Nickalls, J.C. Badcock, D.H.L. Gollan, H.M. Lane, G.C. Killick, J. Beresford Jnr., Harold West, Arthur Sulley	First Trinity	1 1/2l	
1929	Leander Club	E. Norman-Butler, R.J. Elles, H.R. Carver, T.R.B. Sanders, J.C. Holcroft, J.B. Collins, C.E. Wool-Lewis, T.A. Brocklebank, J.K. Brock (cox)	Thames Rowing Club	2l	
1930	London Rowing Club	R. Close-Brooks, E.G.L. Howitt, G.H. Crawford, H.C. Boardman, H.R.A. Edwards, A.J. Harby, F.M.L. Fitzwilliams, T.N. O'Brien, J.A. Brown (cox)	Leander Club	1 1/2l	
1931	London Rowing Club	R. Close-Brooks, T.D.M. Boyland, D. St.J. Gogarty, P.N. Carpmael, H.R.A. Edwards, A.J. Harby, F.M.L. Fitzwilliams, E.G.L. Howitt, P.B. Geoghegan (cox)	Thames Rowing Club	1/3l	
1932	Leander Club	Tom Askwith, D Haig-Thomas, C J S Sergel, D H E McCowen, K M Payne, H R N Rickett, W A T Sambell, L Luxton, J M Ranking	Thames Rowing Club	1/2l	
1933	London Rowing Club	R.J.D. Forbes, T.D.M. Boyland, P.N. Carpmael, G. Bigland Wood, P.H. Jackson, E.G.L. Howitt, D.H. Mays-Smith, T.Turner, W.H.W. Cane (cox)	Berliner Ruderclub, Germany	¼l	
1934	Leander Club	J.H.C. Powell, J.M. Couchman, J.H. Lascelles, A.V. Sutcliffe, P.Hogg, K.M. Payne, D.J. Wilson, W.G.R.M. Laurie, J.N. Duckworth (cox)	Princeton University, USA	¾l	
1935	Pembroke College, Cm	T.R.M. Bairstow, M.G. Pascalis, G.M. Lewis, G.C. Wells, A.D. Kingsford, D.G. Kingsford, J.H.T. Wilson, N.P. Rough, H. Walmsley (cox)	Leander Club	1¾l	
1936	Zurich Rowing Club, SWI	Werner Schweizer, Fritz Feldmann, Rudolf Homberger, Oskar Neuenschwander, Hermann Betschart, Hans Homberger, Alex Homberger, Karl Schmid, Rolf Spring (cox)	Leander Club	1¼l	
1937	RG Wiking Berlin, GER	U. Beir, H. Friedrich, H. Braun, R. Mosch, G. Vols, W. Loeckle, H.J. Hannemann, H. Schmidt, F.W. Mayer (cox)	Jesus College, Cm	1/2l	
1938	London Rowing Club	M.P. Lee, H.C. Fraser, J.H. Pinches, R.Parker, P.H. Jackson, W.F. McMichael, T.R.M. Bristow, P.L.M. Hartley, D.R. Rose (cox)	Trinity Hall	1 1/3l	
1939	Harvard University, USA	W.B. Pirnie, J.R. Richards, D. Talbot, R.L. Fowler, W.N. Kernan, S. Gray, R. Stevens, J.G. Wilson, G.H. Shortlidge (cox)	Argonaut Rowing Club, Canada	3l	
1940–1945 no races (WWII)

=== 1946–1999 ===
Year	Winner	Crew	Runner-up	Dist	ref
1946	Leander Club	R.M.T. Raikes, A.J.R. Purssell, P. Bradley, H.W. Mason, R.D. Burnell, R.M.A. Bourne, P.N. Brodie, N.J. Bradley, G.D. Clapperton (cox)	Ruder Club Zurich, Switzerland	¾l	
1947	Jesus College, Cm	D.C. Bray, G.S.S. Ludford, D.V.L.H. Odhams, F.L. Whalley, G.C.Thomas, J.P. Whalley, N.S. Rogers, C.B.R. Barton, D.S.M. Harriss	Roevereeniging de Delftsche Sport	1¼l	
1948	Thames Rowing Club	R.C. Morris, J.R. Johnson, J.L. Sangster, U. Burkard, Hank Rushmere, T.H. Christie, Tony Butcher, P.C. Kirkpatrick, J.G. Dearlove	Jesus & Pembroke Colleges	2 1/2l	
1949	Leander Club	J.G.C. Blacker, R.M.T. Raikes, J.R.L. Carstairs, J.R.W. Gleave, Bill Windham, Dickie Burnell, Peter de Giles, Pat Bradley, Alan Palgrave-Brown (cox)	Thames Rowing Club	1l	
1950	Harvard University, USA	C.T. Asp, K. Keniston, C.O. Iselin, E. Reynolds, S.E. Hedberg, J.E. Slocum, G.H. Gifford, L.B. McCagg, W.T. Leavitt (cox)	K.S.R.V. Njord	1¼l	
1951	Lady Margaret Boat Club	H.H. Almond, J.S.M. Jones, J.R. Dingle, D.D. Macklin, E.J. Worlidge, R.F.A. Sharpley, N.B.M. Clack, C.B.M. Lloyd, P. Prestt (cox)	DRS Laga, Holland	1l	
1952	Leander Club	D.D. Macklin, A.L. Macleod, N.B.M. Clack, R.F.A. Sharpley, E.J. Worlidge, C.B.M. Lloyd, W.A.D. Windham, D.M. Jennens, J.F.K. Hinde (cox)	Sydney Rowing Club	1/2l	
1953	Leander Club	D.D. Macklin, R.M.S. Gubbins, Peter de Giles, D.A.T. Leadley, E.A.P. Bircher, C.G.V. Davidge, Bill Windham, G.A. H. Cadbury, J.F.K. Hinde (cox)	USM des Transports, France	¾l	
1954	Krylia Sovetov, USSR	Y.N. Brago, V.A. Rodimushkin, S.L. Amiragov, I.A. Borisov, Y.B. Samsonov, B. Vaysberg, A.F. Komarov, V. Kryukov, N. Kolosovskiy (cox)	Leander Club	2 1/2l	
1955	Univ of Pennsylvania, USA	J.E. Weise, H.L. Parker, B.W. Fitzpatrick, C.J. Schaffer, A.T. Friend, F.M. Betts, B.A Crocco, F.S. Lane, J.L. De Gurse (cox)	Vancouver Rowing Club, Canada	1/3l	
1956	Centre Sportif des Forces de Armee, FRA	S. Marcuzzi, E. Clerc, R. Duc, M. Bas, E. Leguery, J. Vignon, M. Houdayer, R. Massiasse, J. Vilcoq (cox)	Roddklubben Three Towns	1l	
1957	Cornell University, USA	J.M. van Horn, R.W. Staley, D.F. Davis, O.S. Simpson, W.J. Schumacher, C.W. Chapman, G.F. Ford, P. T Gravink, C.W. Schwarz (cox)	Yale University, USA	1/2l	
1958	Trud Leningrad, USSR	O. Vasiljev, Y. Rogozov, Y. Popov, G. Brjulijgart, Y Cherstvy A. Antonov, G. Guschenko, B. Federov, Y. Poljiakov (cox)	Leichhardt Rowing Club	2 1/2l	
1959	Harvard University, USA	T S Swayze, J O Ellefson, J C Breckinridge, J H Jones, K W Gregg, T Everett, J C A McClennen, P T Boyden, B Peale (Cox).	Thames Rowing Club	2¾l	
1960	Molesey Boat Club,	J M Beresford, J M Russell, J P C Vigurs, S C Crosse, K R Knight, C F Porter, J W Tilbury, C G V Davidge, T H Rosslyn Smith (Cox).	Oxford University	1/3l	
1961	Central Sport Club of the USSR Navy	S Derbyshev, V Schipunov, G Borisov, V Rozhkov, D Semenov, A Tkachuk, V Khatuntsev, I Andreev, A Luzgin (Cox).	Leander Club	1l	
1962	Central Sport Club of the USSR Navy	S Derbyshev, V Schipunov, G Borisov, V Rozhkov, R Mordusas, A Tkachuk, V Khatuntsev, I Andreev, I Luzgin (Cox).	Cannottieri Moto Guzzi, Italy	1/3l	
1963	Univ of London BC	J.M. Kinnear, S.S. Willder, R.M. Williams, W.G. Hodgson, S. Farquharson, J.D. Lee Nicholson, R.G. Nicholson, D.C.F Latham, C.W. Layton (cox)	Cornell University, USA	¾l	
1964	Club Zjalghiris Viljnjus, USSR	Juozas Jagelavičius, Petras Karla, Vytautas Briedis, Volodymyr Sterlik, Yury Suslin, Zigmas Jukna, Antanas Bagdonavičius, Ričardas Vaitkevičius, Yuriy Lorentsson (cox)	Univ of London BC	e	
1965	Ratzeburg Rowing Club, FRG	Horst Meyer, Dirk Schreyer, Christian Prey, Klaus Behrens, Dagobert Thometschek, Jürgen Schröder, Hans-Jürgen Wallbrecht, Klaus Aeffke, P. Mainka (cox)	Vesper Boat Club, USA	1/2l	
1966	Berliner TSC, GDR	H. Leifke, J. Engel, H-J. Bothe, J. Lucke, E. Wunderlich, K. Wunderlich, K-D. Bahr, P. Hein, K-D. Neubert (cox)	Tideway Scullers School	1/2l	
1967	SC DHfK Leipzig, GDR	H. Bunsen, H.J. Friedrich, H. Hackel, H. Lubbert, K. Lubbert, C. Wilke, W. Riemann, K. Stuhlmann, M. Wozniak (cox)	Tideway Scullers School	2 1/2l	
1968	Univ of London BC		Oxford Univ BC	3l	
1969	SC Einheit Dresden, GDR		University Pennsylvania, USA	¾l	
1970	ASK Vorwärts Rostock, GDR		GSR Aegir, NED	1/2l	
1971	Tideway Scullers School	M Cooper, D Gramolt, R Massara, N Hornsby, W Almand, C Pierce, M Tebay, R 'D' Findlay, A Inns (c)	Cairo Police Rowing Club	2 1/3l	
1972	WMF Moscow, USSR	Mykola Sumatokhin, Alexander Martyshkin, Alexander Ryazankin, Viktor Melnikov, Benjaminas Natsevichius, Mindaugas Vaitkus, Viktor Levchin, Alexander Vysotsky, Viktor Mikheev (c)	Northeastern University, USA	2/3l	
1973	Trud Leningrad, USSR	Konstantin Yegorov (s), Anushavan Gassan-Dzhalalov, Valeriy Akimov, Vladimir Solovyov, Victor Smolev, Andrey Onezhskiy, Victor Kovrov, Victor Lazutkin, Igor Rudakov (c); coach Kirill Putyrskiy	Northeastern University	2 2/3l	
1974	Trud Kolomna, USSR		Leander & Thames Tradsmens	1/2l	
1975	Leander Club & Thames Tradesmens		Harvard University, USA	2l	
1976	Thames Tradesmens		Leander Club	2/3l	
1977	University of Washington, USA		Leander Club & Thames Tradesmens	1l	
1978	Trakia Club, BUL		University of Washington, USA	¾l	
1979	Thames Tradesmens & London RC		Yale University	2 1/3l	
1980	Charles River RA, USA		Waiko & Wairau Rowing Clubs	1¼l	
1981	Oxford Univ BC & Thames Tradesmens	A.C.D Wiggin, A. Whitwell, R.P. Yonge, N.B. Rankov, J.A. Justice, C.J. Mahoney, M.D. Andrews, J.L. Bland (s), C.P. Berners-Lee (c)	Leander & Tyrian	1/2l	
1982	Leander & London RC	Duncan McDougall, Gunnar Suenson-Taylor, Jim Clark, John Beattie, Andy Holmes, John Pritchard, Malcolm McGowan, Richard Stanhope (s), Colin Moynihan (c)	Univ of London BC & Tyrian	1/2l	
1983	London RC & Univ of London BC	Ian McNuff, John Beattie, Adam Clift, Martin Cross, Richard Budgett, Tom Cadeaux Hudson, Richard Stanhope, John Bland (s), Alan Sherman (c)	Cambridge Univ BC	4l	
1984	Leander & London RC	D. McDougall, C. Mahoney, S. Hassan, J. Pritchard, A. Clift, C. Roberts, M. McGowan, A. Whitwell (s), M. Teather (c)	University of Washington, USA	3l	
1985	Harvard University, USA	Neil Oleson, Daniel Grout, Arthur Hollingsworth, George Hunnewell, Richard Kennelly, Curt-Michael Pieckenhagen, Andrew Hawley, Andrew Sudduth (s), Devon Mahoney (c), Harry Parker (coach)	Princeton University, USA	3 2/3l	
1986	Nautilus Rowing Club		University of Pennsylvania, USA	¾l	
1987	Soviet Army, USSR		Ridley Boat Club, Canada	1 1/3l	
1988	Leander & Univ of London BC		Australian Institute for Sport	1 ft	
1989	RC Hansa von 1898 Dortmund	Jörg Puttlitz, Norbert Kesslau, Martin Steffes-Mies, Dirk Balster, Mark Mauerwerk, Ansgar Wessling, Frank Dietrich, Roland Baar (s), Manfred Klein (c)	Dinamo, USSR	3l	
1990	RC Hansa von 1898 Dortmund	Martin Steffes-Mies, Christoph Korte, Frank Richter, Dirk Balster, Frank Dietrich, Armin Weyrauch, Matthias Ungemach, Roland Baar (s), Manfred Klein (c)	Leander & University of London	2l	
1991	Leander & Star Club	Tim Foster (s)	Dinamo & Soviet Army, USSR	2 1/2l	
1992	Univ of London BC	Charlie Brooke-Partridge, Bill Latimer, Toby Backhouse, Jamie Stearns, Damian Rimmer, Martin Peel, Adrian Cassidy, Matthew Parish (s), Mike Thompsett (c)	Ruderklub Wannsee, Germany	1¾l	
1993	RC Hansa von 1898 Dortmund	Roland Baar, Peter Hoeltzenbein, Andreas Lütkefels, Frank Richter, Stefan Scholz, Martin Steffes-Mies, Thorsten Streppelhoff, Colin von Ettingshausen, Peter Thiede (c)	Cambridge Univ BC & Univ of London BC	2¾l	
1994	Charles River RA and San Diego RC, USA	Jon Brown, William Castle, Fredric Honebein, Jamie Koven, Tom Murray, Michael Peterson, William Porter, Don Smith, Steven Segaloff (c)	SN Compiegne & D'Encouragement, France	e	
1995	San Diego Training Center, USA	Adam Holland, Michael Peterson, Robert Kaehler, Chip McKibben, Jon Brown, Don Smith, Fredric Honebein, James Koven (s), Steven Segaloff (c)	Leander & Molesey	1/3l	
1996	Imperial College & Queen's Tower	Simon Wall, Rick Dunn, Simon Dennis, Louis Attrill, Luka Grubor, David Gillard, Martin Kettle, Pete Wilson, Jim Goodwin (c)	RSR Skadi & Wageningsche SR Argo	2l	
1997	NSW & Australian Institute of Sport	Robert Walker, Geoff Stewart, Alastair Gordon, David Porzig, James Stewart, Daniel Burke, Drew Ginn, Richard Wearne (s), David Colvin (c)	Berlin & Tegel RC, Germany	3l	
1998	RC Hansa von 1898 Dortmund & Berliner Ruderclub	Jörg Dießner, Stefan Forster, Stefan Heinze, Kai Horl, Thomas Jung, Ike Landvoigt, Enrico Schnabel, Marc Weber, Peter Thiede (c)	S d'Encouragement dSN & EN d'Bordeaux, FRA	2 1/2l	
1999	RC Hansa von 1898 Dortmund & Berliner Ruderclub	Sven Ueck, Mark Kleinschmidt, Jan Herzog, Uwe Steenblock, Sebastian Thormann, Ike Landvoigt, Stefan Forster, Marc Weber, Peter Thiede (c)	Leander & Queen's Tower	1/2l	

=== 2000–2019 ===
Year	Winner	Crew	Runner-up	Dist	ref
2000	Australian Institute of Sport, Australia	Daniel Burke, Jaime Fernandez, Alastair Gordon, Rob Jahrling, Matthew Long, Mike McKay, Nick Porzig, Stuart Welch (s), Brett Hayman (c)	Leander & Queen's Tower	1 1/2l	
2001	H.A.V.K. Mladost and V.K. Croatia	Damir Vučičić, Oliver Martinov, Tomislav Smoljanović, Nikša Skelin, Siniša Skelin, Krešimir Čuljak, Igor Boraska, Branimir Vujević, Silvijo Petriško (c)	Sydney Rowing Club & Univ of Technology, Sydney	4¾l	
2002	Victoria City RC & University of Victoria, CAN	Matt Swick, Kyle Hamilton, Ben Rutledge, Andrew Hoskins, Adam Kreek, Jeff Powell, Joe Stankevicius, Kevin Light (s) Brian Price (c)	RC Hansa von 1898 Dortmund & R. Munster	1/2l	
2003	Victoria City RC, CAN	Joe Stankevicius, Kevin Light, David Calder, Kyle Hamilton, Ben Rutledge, Andrew Hoskins, Adam Kreek, Jeff Powell (s), Brian Price (c)	Princeton T.C, USA	2¾l	
2004	Hollandia Roeiclub	Matthijs Vellenga, Gijs Vermeulen, Jan-Willem Gabriëls, Daniël Mensch, Geert-Jan Derksen, Gerritjan Eggenkamp, Diederik Simon, Michiel Bartman (s), Chun Wei Cheung (c)	Harvard University, USA	2/3l	
2005	Dortmund Rowing Center	Jochen Urban, Sebastian Schulte, Stephan Koltzk, Jan-Martin Bröer, Jan Tebrügge, Ulf Siemes, Thorsten Engelmann, Andreas Penkner, Peter Thiede (c)	Molesey & Oxford Brookes	2/3l	
2006	Hollandia Roeiclub	David Kuiper, Peter Vos, Rogier Blink, Roel Haen, Geert Cirkel, Diederik Simon, Gerritjan Eggenkamp, Mitchel Steenman, Noortje Tollenaar (c)	Leander Club & Oxford Brookes	1l	
2007	Shawnigan Lake RC & Victoria City RC, CAN	Kyle Hamilton, Adam Kreek, Dominic Seiterle, Malcolm Howard, Jake Wetzel, Andrew Byrnes, Ben Rutledge, Kevin Light, Brian Price (c)	Australian Institute of Sport	1¼l	
2008	Kingston RC, Canada & Victoria City RC, CAN	Anthony Jacob, Conlin McCabe, Will Dean, Blake Pucsek, Chris Aylard, Will Crothers, Stephen Connolly, Rob Gibson, Ronan Sabo-Walsh (c)	University of Southern California	2l	
2009	Leander & Molesey	Tom Broadway, James Clarke, James Orme, Peter Marsland, Tom Wilkinson, Tom Burton, Tom Solesbury, Tom Ransley, Phelan Hill (c)	Princeton T.C & California RC	1/2l	
2010	RC Hansa von 1898 Dortmund	Gregor Hauffe, Maximilian Reinelt, Kristof Wilke, Florian Mennigen, Richard Schmidt, Lukas Müller, Toni Seifert, Sebastian Schmidt, Martin Sauer (c)	Waiariki RC & Tideway Scullers School	1¾l	
2011	RC Hansa von 1898 Dortmund	Gregor Hauffe, Maximilian Reinelt, Kristof Wilke, Florian Mennigen, Richard Schmidt, Lukas Müller, Toni Seifert, Sebastian Schmidt, Martin Sauer (c)	Leander & Molesey	1l	
2012	California Rowing Club, USA	Brendan Shald, Brad Bertoldo, Spencer Crowley, Derek Johnson, Andrew Melander, Ryan Monaghan, Silvan Zehnder, Andrew Gallagher, Alexandra Olijnyk (c)	Brown University, USA	1¼l	
2013	Leander & Molesey	Andrew Triggs Hodge (s), Tom Ransley, Dan Ritchie, Pete Reed, Will Satch, Moe Sbihi, Alex Gregory, George Nash, Phelan Hill (c)	University of Washington	1l	
2014	Leander & Univ of London BC	Nathaniel Reilly-O'Donnell, Tom Ransley, Paul Bennett, Matt Gotrel, Pete Reed, C Louloudis, Matthew Tarrant, Will Satch, Phelan Hill (c)	Club France	1 1/2l	
2015	Leander & Molesey	Will Satch (s), George Nash, Alex Gregory, Moe Sbihi, Paul Bennett, Pete Reed, Constantine Louloudis, Matt Gotrel, Phelan Hill (c)	RC Hansa von 1898 Dortmund	2¾l	
2016	Hollandia Roeiclub	Dirk Uittenbogaard, Boaz Meylink, Kaj Hendriks, Boudewijn Röell, Olivier Siegelaar, Tone Wieten, Mechiel Versluis, Robert Lücken, Peter Wiersum (c)	Nautilus	¾l	
2017	Passau & Treviris Trier, Germany	Johannes Weißenfeld, Felix Wimberger, Max Planer, Torben Johannesen, Jakob Schneider, Malte Jakschik, Richard Schmidt, Hannes Ocik, Martin Sauer (c)	Leander & Newcastle University	1l	
2018	Georgina Hope Rinehart NTC, Australia	Angus Moore, Timothy Masters, Alexander Purnell, Josh Booth, Joshua Hicks, Spencer Turrin, Jack Hargreaves, Alex Hill (s), Kendall Brodie (c)	CS Dinamo București & CSA Steaua București	¾l	
2019	Waiariki Rowing Club, New Zealand	Hamish Bond, Mahe Drysdale, Stephen Jones, Shaun Kirkham, James Lassche, Matt Macdonald, Brook Robertson, Philip Wilson, Sam Bosworth (c)	Leander Club & Oxford Brookes	1l	

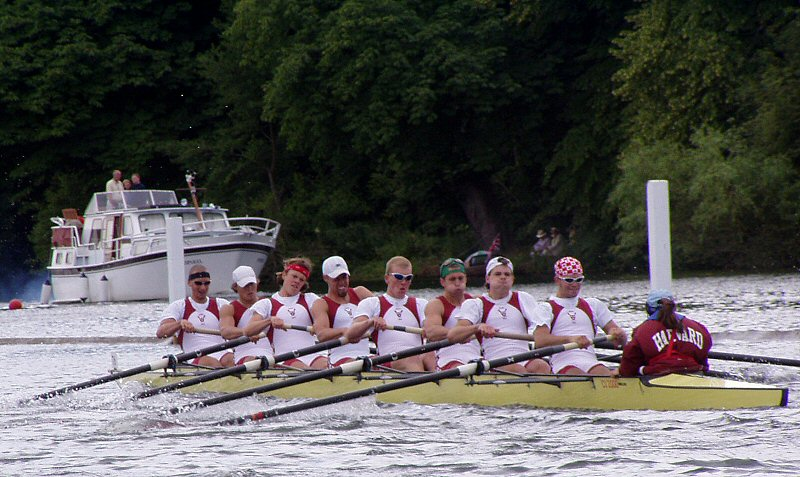
The Harvard University crew, runner-up during the 2004 regatta

=== 2020 onwards ===
Year	Winner	Crew	Runner-up	Dist	ref
2020	No competition due to COVID-19 pandemic				
2021	Oxford Brookes	Freddie Davidson, David Ambler, Sam Nunn, Henry Blois-Brooke, Ollie Wilkes, Sam Bannister, Tom Digby, David Bewicke-Copley, Harry Brightmore (c)	Taurus and Tyrian	e	
2022	Oxford Brookes & Leander	Rory Gibbs, Morgan Bolding, David Bewicke-Copley, Sholto Carnegie, Charlie Elwes, Tom Digby, James Rudkin, Tom Ford, Henry Fieldman (c)	Rowing Australia	2¾l	
2023	Oxford Brookes & Leander	Will Stewart, Morgan Bolding, Jacob Dawson, Sholto Carnegie, Rory Gibbs, Tom Digby, James Rudkin, Tom Ford, Harry Brightmore (c)	Maple Bay RC, CAN	3l	
2024	Oxford Brookes & Taurus	Louis Nares, Toby Lassen, Fergus Woolnough, Jake Wincomb, James Doran, Sam Nunn, Thijs Ruiken, Matthew Heywood, Tom Bryce (c)	Univ of Washington RC	3¾l	
2025	Rowing Australia	Austin Reinehr, Nikolas Pender, Jack Robertson, Charles Batrouney, Fergus Hamilton, Alex Nichol, Angus Dawson, Alexander Hill, Nicholas Dunlop (c)	Hollandia Roeiclub	1l	

Key

- e - easily
- f - foul
- i - inches
- ro - row over
- ft - feet
- l - length/s
- (s) - stroke
- (c) - Coxswain

== Notes and references ==
Notes

== Sources ==
- Henley Royal Regatta
- Recent Results
- Henley finals results 1839–1939
- Henley finals results 1946 onwards
