= Timeline of the Greater Victoria Water System =

CRD Integrated Water Services
- Type: Water utility
- Industry: Water
- Founded: 1996
- Headquarters: Victoria, British Columbia
- Key people: Ted Robbins, General Manager
- Website: crd.bc.ca

The water supply system for Victoria, British Columbia, Canada, now operated by the Capital Regional District (CRD), served in 2010 over 330,000 people with clean drinking water from a catchment area of 11,025 hectares (27,240 acres) centered on its main reservoir at Sooke Lake. The CRD's ownership and complete control of its entire watershed assures its customers of a supply that is secure in both quantity and quality. The main reservoir and its subsidiary reservoirs are estimated to contain 93 billion litres of water, enough to meet the needs of its customers for two years without any rainfall. The history of this remarkable system is sketched below.

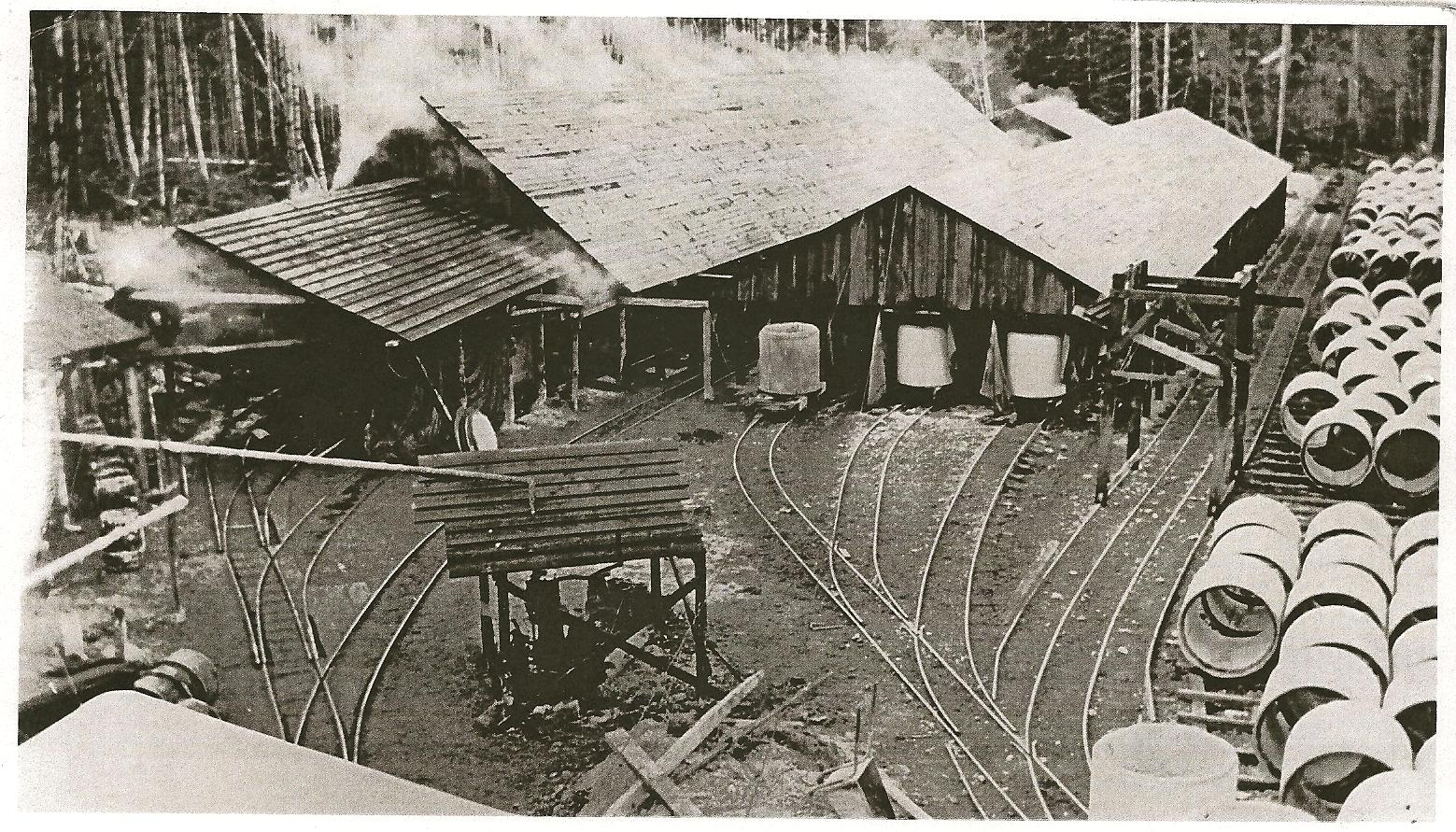
The flowline pipe manufacturing plant at Cooper's Cove near Sooke, 1914

== Beginnings (1842–1843) ==
In 1842 Sir James Douglas led an expedition from Fort Vancouver on the Columbia River to find a suitable location for a Hudson's Bay trading post on southern Vancouver Island. He examined three harbours: Sy-yousung (now Sooke), Is-whoy-malth (now Esquimalt), and Camosack (now Victoria). Of these he picked Camosack as "the most advantageous." He rejected the first two for various reasons, which for Esquimalt included the scarcity of fresh water. "There are several good Runs in Winter," he wrote, "but we found them all dried up, and we could not manage to fill a single Beaker in the Harbour." But for all its other advantages, Camosack, which became Fort Victoria, had the same problem. Lieutenants Warre and Vavason of the Royal Engineers noted on their inspection of the place in 1845: "This fort has lately been established; it is badly situated with regard to water and position, which latter has been chosen for its agricultural advantages only."

== Spring Hill and Harris Pond (1843–1863) ==
Of course the newly established Fort Victoria could not exist without a water supply. Exploration of the surrounding area located two sources, both about one mile (1.6 km) east of the fort at what became known as Spring Hill and Harris Pond (near the present location of Victoria High School). At first, water was transported to the fort in barrels. Eventually the trail became a road over which wagons could be driven. As the town developed around the fort, private operators took over the operation and provided customers with two buckets a day for the equivalent of fifty cents a week.

== The Coe-Martin pipeline (1863–1875) ==
By the late 1850s, especially with Victoria's growth as a port in response to the gold rushes on the Fraser River in 1858 and in the Cariboo in 1861, transport of water by wagon was becoming impractical. In 1863, entrepreneurs John Coe and Thomas Martin undertook to dig a shaft at the spring that greatly increased the flow of water. They contracted with J. P. Cranford to build a pipeline into town. The pipes were 12-foot (3.7 m)-long logs that were hollowed out and attached end to end to extend from the spring to the San Francisco Bathhouse on Government Street, from where deliveries were made to customers by wagon. The resulting increase in the water supply made it possible to fill four cisterns, ranging in size from 25,000 to 60,000 imperial gallons (114,000 to 276,000 L) to provide a reserve of water for fire protection. Coe and Martin formed the Spring Ridge Water Works Company in 1864, serving the city until 1875.

== The Elk Lake/Beaver Lake Reservoir (1875–1915) ==
By 1869 it was evident that the spring and pond would soon be incapable of supplying Victoria's growing population. Concerns were also expressed about the business practices of the Spring Ridge Water Company. The city engineer, Mr. Buckley, was asked to investigate the possibilities. He submitted a report in May 1872 recommending the use of Elk and Beaver Lakes that lay about 6 miles (9.7 km) north of the city. One result of his report was passage of the Victoria Waterworks Act of 1873 by the Provincial Legislature giving the City of Victoria disposal over all water sources within a radius of 20 miles (32 km).

Debentures were issued raising the money needed, and work began in 1874. Beaver Lake was the smaller and lower of the two lakes. A dam and filter bed were built at its southwest corner where its water flowed into Colquitz Creek. This raised the water level to that of Elk Lake, forming a single larger lake. A 9-mile (14 km) pipeline ranging in diameter from 7 to 9 inches (178 to 229 mm) was laid along what is now Pipeline Road to a distribution point known as Fountain Square at the intersection of Government Street, Douglas Street and Hillside Avenue, from which water was supplied to customers in the city.

The quality of this water was problematic from the start. The filter beds were altered and enlarged four times between 1876 and 1883 with only minimally noticeable effect, while demand was constantly increasing. Connections to users outside the city were cut off in 1885, and use within the city for lawns and gardens was banned. Between 1887 and 1889 a 16-inch main was added, which for the moment solved the availability problem but exacerbated the quality problem, as the increased flow rate carried more sediment through the filters. Additional modifications to the filter beds provided only temporary relief.

In 1900 the North Dairy pumping station was established on Quadra Street at Reynolds Road. This improved the quantity but not the quality. In August, 1904, a fire in downtown Victoria devastated several city blocks because despite increased quantity there was still insufficient water for such a large fire. A separate high-pressure system was built in the city using saltwater solely for fire protection. Work was also begun on a balancing reservoir on Smith's Hill, which was completed in 1909 and is now the location of Summit Park.

Despite these improvements, the supply and quality of water remained problematic until 1915. Between 1909 and 1915 the Water Department was constantly dealing with complaints about quality and low pressure. Water had to be rationed during this period. At one point the Water Commissioner, Charles Henry Rust, noticed an unusually heavy usage at the Empress Hotel. Investigation revealed that the hotel, which was owned by Canadian Pacific, was washing all the laundry for the CP steamships that came into the harbour. He warned that the hotel would be shut off completely if it did not cease this practice immediately.

== Sooke Lake and Humpback Reservoir (1915–1970) ==
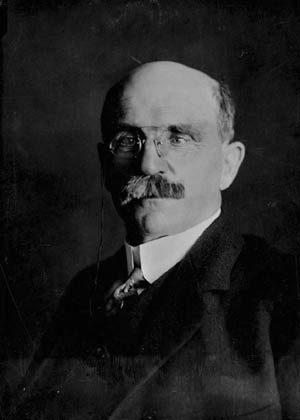
Charles Henry Rust, Victoria Water Commissioner, 1912-15

It was understood already in 1905 that the supply from Elk and Beaver Lakes would not be adequate in the long term. The city brought in a consulting engineer from San Francisco, Arthur L. Adams, to study the problem and recommend solutions. He recommended that the city continue to use the then existing source but with extensive improvements, and if possible to acquire the Esquimalt Water Works Company which was then drawing water from Thetis Lake but also held the rights to the Goldstream Lakes. Adams considered Sooke Lake as a possible source, but members of city council thought it too expensive. Over the next three years, several attempts to claim Goldstream water and/or expropriate or purchase the Esquimalt Water Works failed. Adams was called upon for advice again in 1907. This time he put greater emphasis on Sooke Lake. Early in the following year, the council put the question of Sooke Lake to the ratepayers in a referendum. Going to Sooke Lake was supported by a two-thirds majority of those voting. It was, however, not until November 1910 that council finally passed the bylaw authorizing the development of Sooke Lake as a source of water supply.

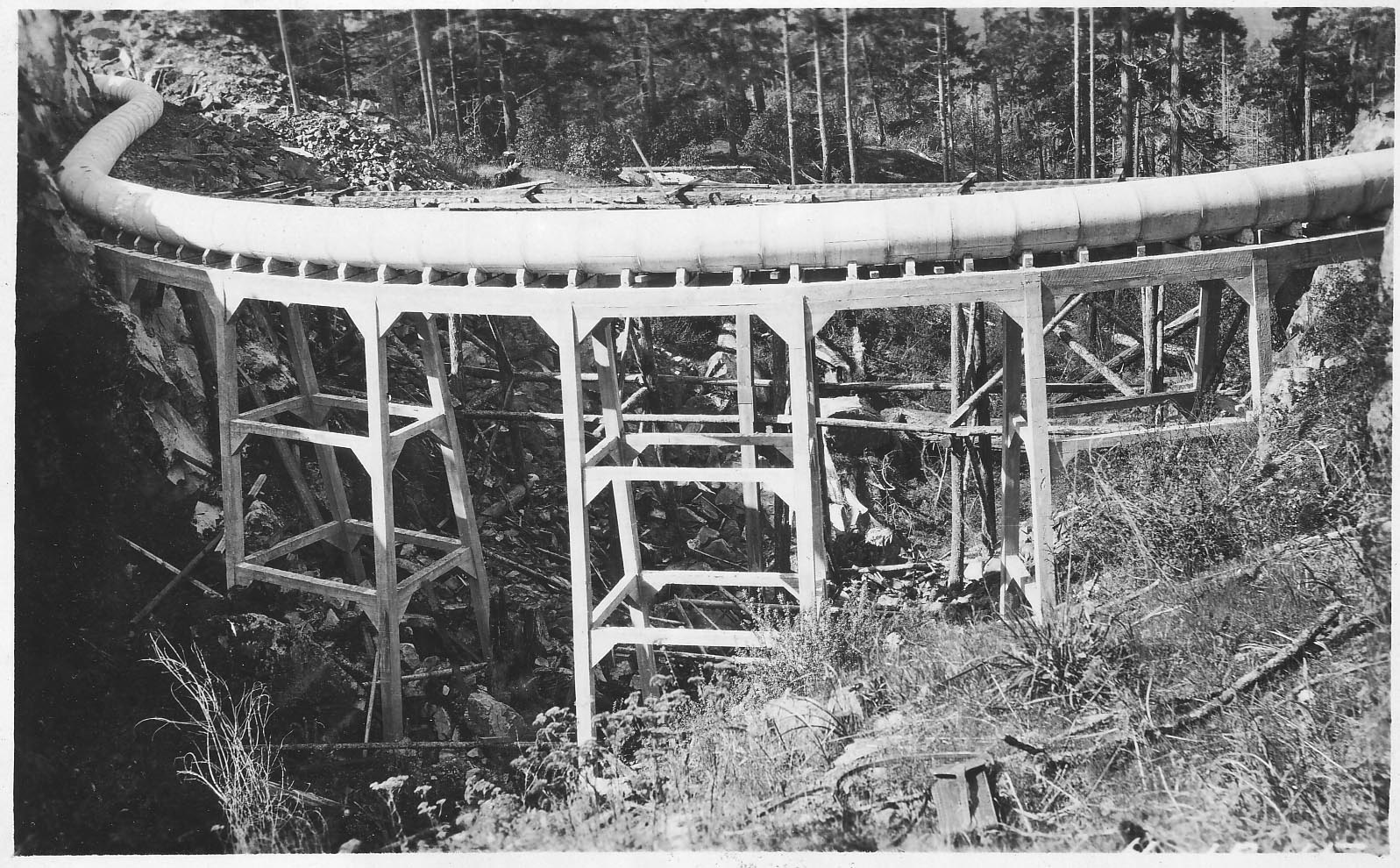
Flowline on trestle, 1915

The engineering of the project was contracted to the firm of Sanderson & Porter, with offices in New York and San Francisco. The responsible design engineer was Wynn Meredith of San Francisco, who had overseen several significant recent engineering projects in British Columbia. Initially, the resident engineer was Harry Hartwell, but he was replaced in July 1912 by Boyd Ehle from Sanderson & Porter's New York Office. The firm established an office in Victoria in the Drake Block at 1414 Douglas St.

Aside from acquiring ownership of the lake and surrounding watershed, Meredith's plan involved constructing a flowline of 27.5 miles (44.3 km) from a dam at Sooke Lake to a holding reservoir to be constructed at the Humpback Road near Goldstream. From there a pipeline would run about 10.5 miles (16.9 km) through the Helmcken Fields and along Burnside Road to a distribution point in the city at Fountain Square.

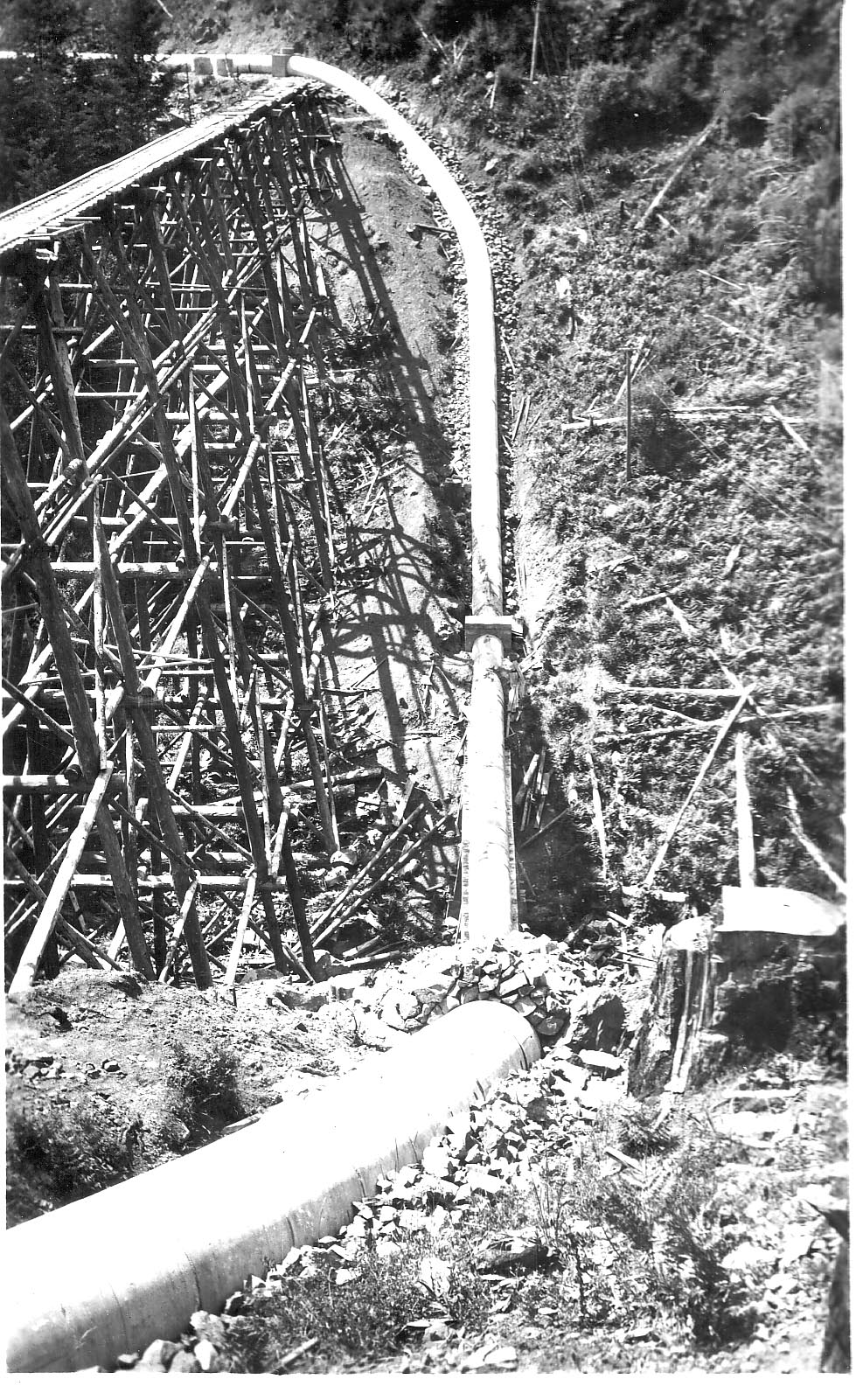
Flowline crosses gully as siphon, 1915

The initial contract for the construction work was awarded to Solomon Cameron and Parker Clarke of the Westholme Lumber Co. in December, 1911. The work began in January, 1912. Problems with the Westholme company led to two significant moves in 1912. First, Charles Henry Rust, who had been the City Engineer in Toronto and had a reputation for getting things done, was brought in as City of Victoria Engineer and was soon appointed to the additional position of Water Commissioner, replacing J. L. Raymur who had held that position in addition to serving as City Comptroller, a position that he retained. Second, the City cancelled Westholme's contract in April 1913, and took over the project as a public work.

The watershed was secured through purchase by the City of the 30 square miles (78 km^{2}) surrounding Sooke Lake. The consulting engineer recommended that the neighboring Leech River watershed also be acquired and connected to Sooke Lake by a 5-mile (8 km) conduit, but this was not undertaken at the time. Sufficient land was acquired around the planned reservoir at Humpback, and a 100 ft (30.5 m) right-of-way for the 27.5-mile (44.3 km) flowline from Sooke Lake to Humpback, as well as the necessary right-of-way for the water main to the city, were added to the package.

The concrete dam at Sooke Lake raised the water level 12 ft (3.7 m), expanding the surface area from 978 to 1,180 acres (396 to 478 hectares) and creating an available storage capacity of 3.355 billion imperial gallons (15,240,000 m3). The balancing reservoir at Humpback was created by building a concrete dam to a height of 31 feet (9.4 m), closing off a sloping valley that would fill with the water piped down from Sooke Lake. The resulting reservoir would cover 13.57 hectares (33.5 acres) and hold up to 136 million imperial gallons (612,000 m3).

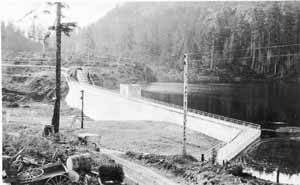
Humpback Dam and Reservoir, 1915

The greatest engineering challenge was to build the flow line of concrete pipe from Sooke Lake to Humpback. A grade was established that would drop 5 feet (1.52 m) per 1 mile (1.6 km) (0.0947%) for the 27.5 miles (44.3 km). The plan had been for 40-inch (1,016 mm) internal diameter pipe, but a contractor, the Pacific Lock Joint Pipe Co., was found, which already had forms for a 42-inch (1,067 mm) diameter reinforced concrete pipe, so it was decided to use that size. A pipe factory was established at Cooper's Cove in Sooke Harbor within 2,000 ft (610 m) of the planned flowline grade, 17.5 miles (28.2 km) from Sooke Lake and 10 miles (16 km) from Humpback. Altogether, this factory produced more than 36,000 4-foot (1.22 m) interlocking sections of concrete pipe.

The laying of the flowline involved building a small gauge railway on the grade from the pipe factory to Sooke Lake and to Humpback. Sections of pipe were loaded on cars, 22 at a haul, and pulled by a small engine up to the end of the line where they were placed into position. As the pipeline was laid, the railway tracks were taken up. When the rails were first laid, 56 wooden trestles had to be built across gullies. When it came to laying the pipeline, 51 of those trestles were replaced by concrete trestles; in five cases they were replaced by inverted siphons.

The final task of the project was to lay a 36-inch (914 mm) diameter rivetted steel pipeline from the Humpback dam to Fountain Square from which a 12-inch (305 mm) main delivered water into town. These pipes were produced by the Burrard Engineering Co. In addition, a 24-inch (610 mm) line ran from this point to the reservoir on Smith's Hill.

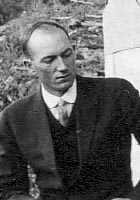
Leonard Frederick Young, Resident Engineer at end of project, 1915

The project was completed in May 1915 with the official opening ceremony held at Sooke Dam on the 28th of that month, Mayor Alexander Stewart presiding. A notice appeared in the city's two newspapers on 1 June that water restrictions would no longer be enforced. There was then more than ample water for the city's population of 50,000.

Boyd Ehle retired from the project in February 1915, to take up an assignment in Cuba. For the last year, Leonard Frederick Young was acting as resident engineer, with Harry Huston Crawford as his assistant. The on-site engineering team included Ivar Hallen, Frederick Sealy, John Krog, Philip Fox, and Charles Pollock. The records of others have been lost except for one engineer with the surname Bartholomew.

In 1925 the city expropriated the Esquimalt Waterworks Company, thus acquiring Goldstream Lake and about 10 square miles (25.90 km^{2}) of additional watershed as well as facilities at Japan Gulch.

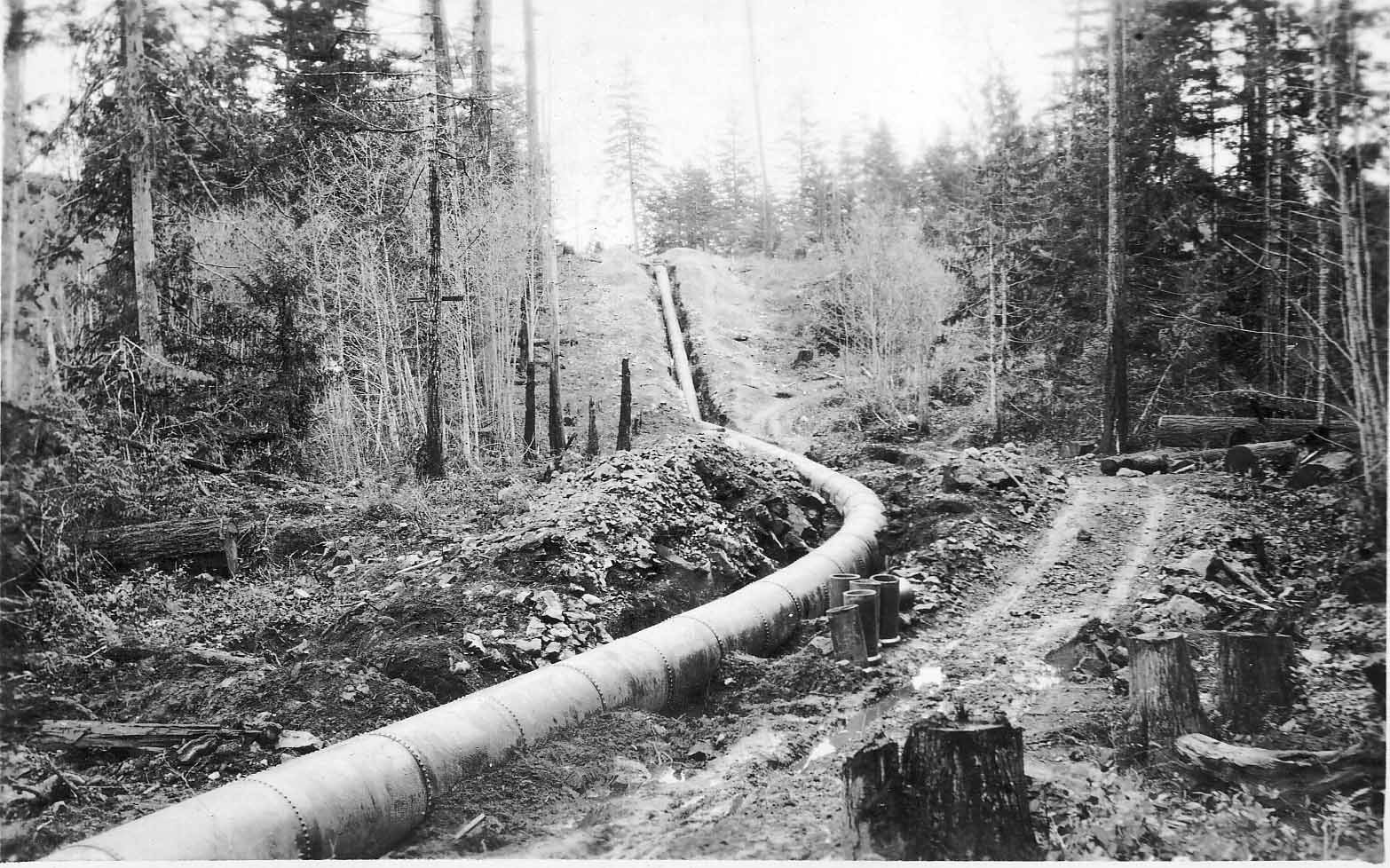
Steel pressure pipeline, 1915

Until 1943 there had been no need for disinfection. In that year, however, Victoria was a marshaling point for both Canadian and American troops. Under pressure from U.S. military authorities chloramination stations were installed at Japan Gulch and Humpback. In 1948 the Greater Victoria Water District was formed to manage the overall water supply for the municipalities of Victoria, Esquimalt, Oak Bay, and Saanich. The latter two municipalities retained responsibility for distribution in their areas.

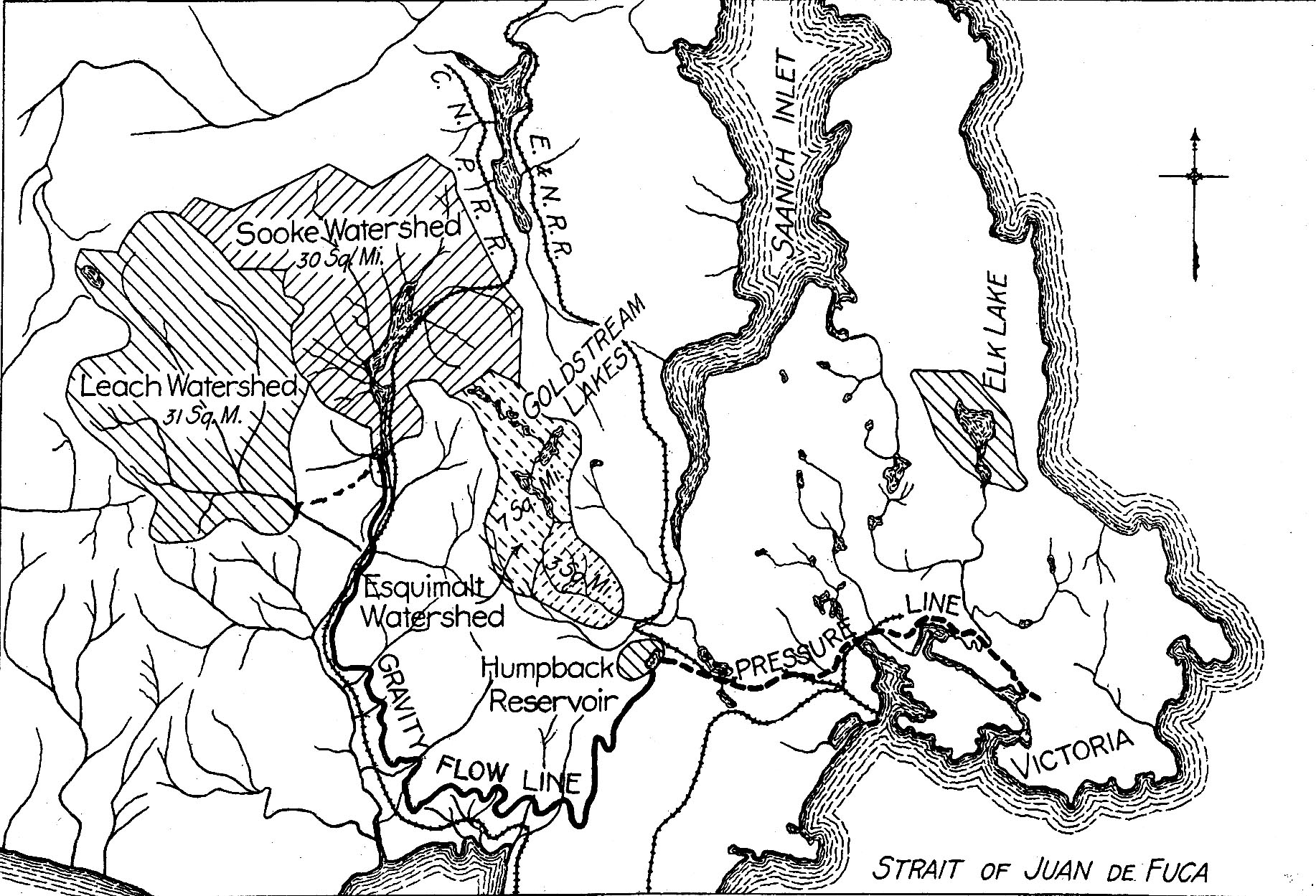
Victoria's Sooke Lake Water System in 1915

With district population rising, it became necessary in 1954 to add a 39-inch (991 mm) main from Humpback to a new balancing reservoir on Mount Tolmie. The reservoir on Smith Hill could no longer handle the added pressure and was taken out of service. By the late 1950s it was becoming evident that the flowline from Sooke Lake to Humpback would soon be outgrown. Aside from limitations of capacity, the old pipeline was leaking significantly, with fully a third of the water that entered it at Sooke Dam being lost through its 36,000 joints before reaching Humpback. Between 1967 and 1970, the level of Sooke Reservoir was raised three times by the addition of flashboards to the spillway.

== The Kapoor Tunnel (1970–present) ==
In 1960 work began on a 5.5-mile (8.9 km) tunnel from Sooke Lake Reservoir to Japan Gulch in the Goldstream valley. The possibility of a tunnel had already been broached by the engineering consultant Arthur L. Adams in 1905, and again in 1907, but was discouraged by council's concern about cost as well as threatened legal action by the Esquimalt Water Works Co., which had a prior claim to the Goldstream watershed.

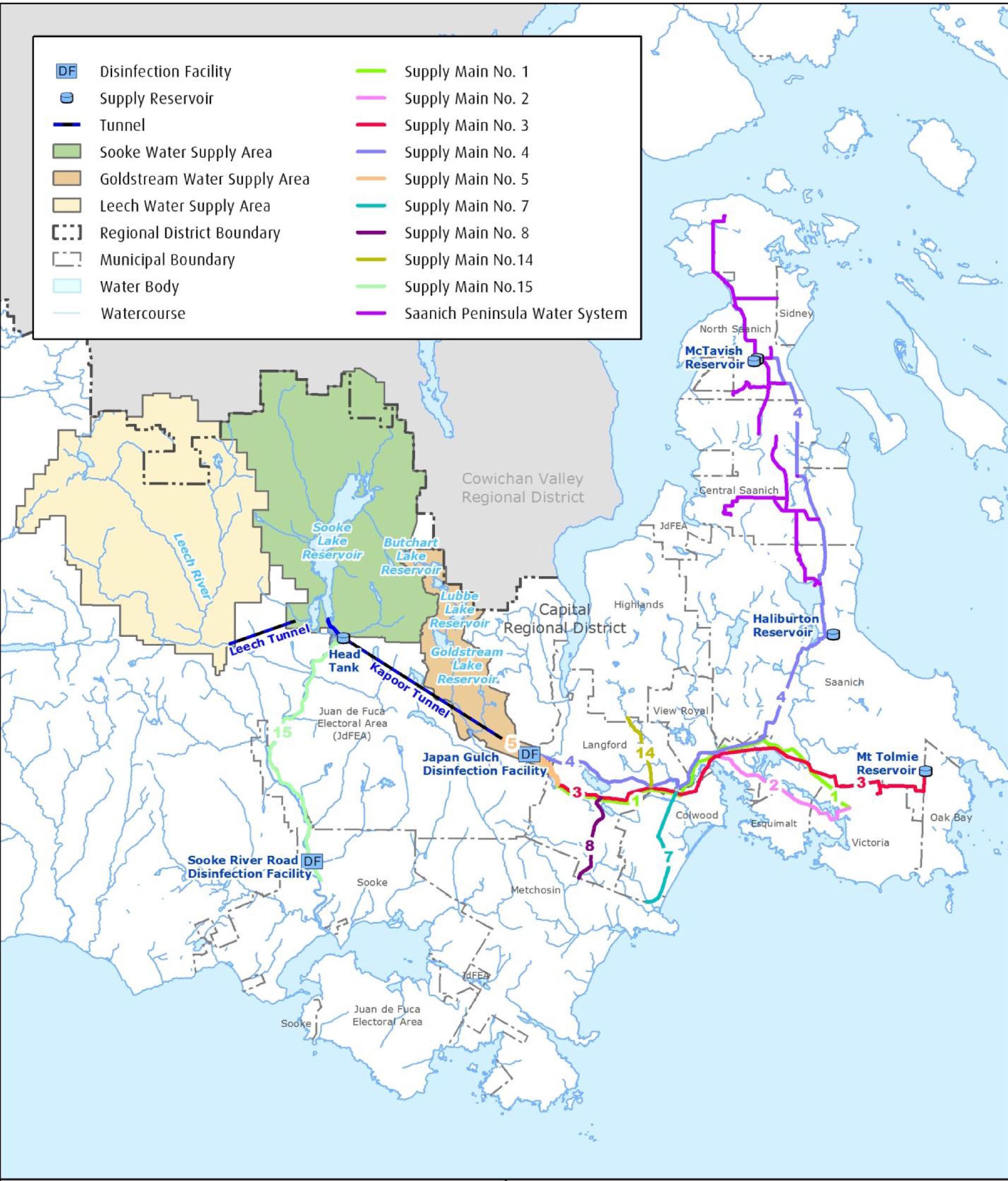
Current regional water supply (courtesy of CRD Integrated Water Services)

As with the flowline, the work was begun on the tunnel by a private company under contract. A full-face boring machine called a mole was used to drill an 8 ft (2.4 m) diameter tunnel into the mountain. The equipment, however, kept breaking down and the contractor went bankrupt. Once again, the project was taken over by the public authority, now the District, and was completed using more conventional methods of drilling, blasting, and mucking. Water was flowing through the tunnel at the rate of 140 million imperial gallons (636,000 m3) per day by 1970. At the same time, the flowline from near the town of Sooke to Humpback was decommissioned. The remaining section coming down from the dam would continue to serve the Sooke area. 1970 also saw the construction of a new 52-foot (16 m) dam at Sooke Lake Reservoir downstream from the old one, which was then inundated. The annual amount of water now available for use was 57 billion litres.

In 1995, 100 people became ill when water from the Humpback reservoir, which was still in service, became contaminated with the parasite Toxoplasma gondii, which causes toxoplasmosis, from the feces of feral cats. As a result of this, Humpback Reservoir was shut down for good and construction was begun on a disinfection plant at Japan Gulch that would use ultraviolet light to neutralize micro-organisms not killed by chlorine. When it came into operation in 2004, it was the largest such plant in North America. In 1996, the now vastly expanded water supply system was transferred from the Greater Victoria Water District to the Capital Regional District.

In 2002, Sooke Dam was raised once again, creating a total system capacity of 95,000,000,000 litres (3.4×10^{9} cu ft). A tunnel had been built in the 1980s from Leech River to Deception Reservoir, a small body of water adjacent to the south end of Sooke Lake Reservoir and separated from it by a saddle dam. The Leech watershed was finally purchased in 2007, adding 8,791 hectares (21,720 acres) to the already existing 11,025 hectares (27,240 acres) of watershed. Owing, however, to concerns about the quality of water from Leech River, its water has, at least for the time being, not been added to that of Sooke Lake Reservoir, but instead has been dedicated to supplementing fisheries water in Sooke River.
