= Elk/Beaver Lake Regional Park =

Park in Saanich, British Columbia

Coordinates: 48.522°N 123.399°W

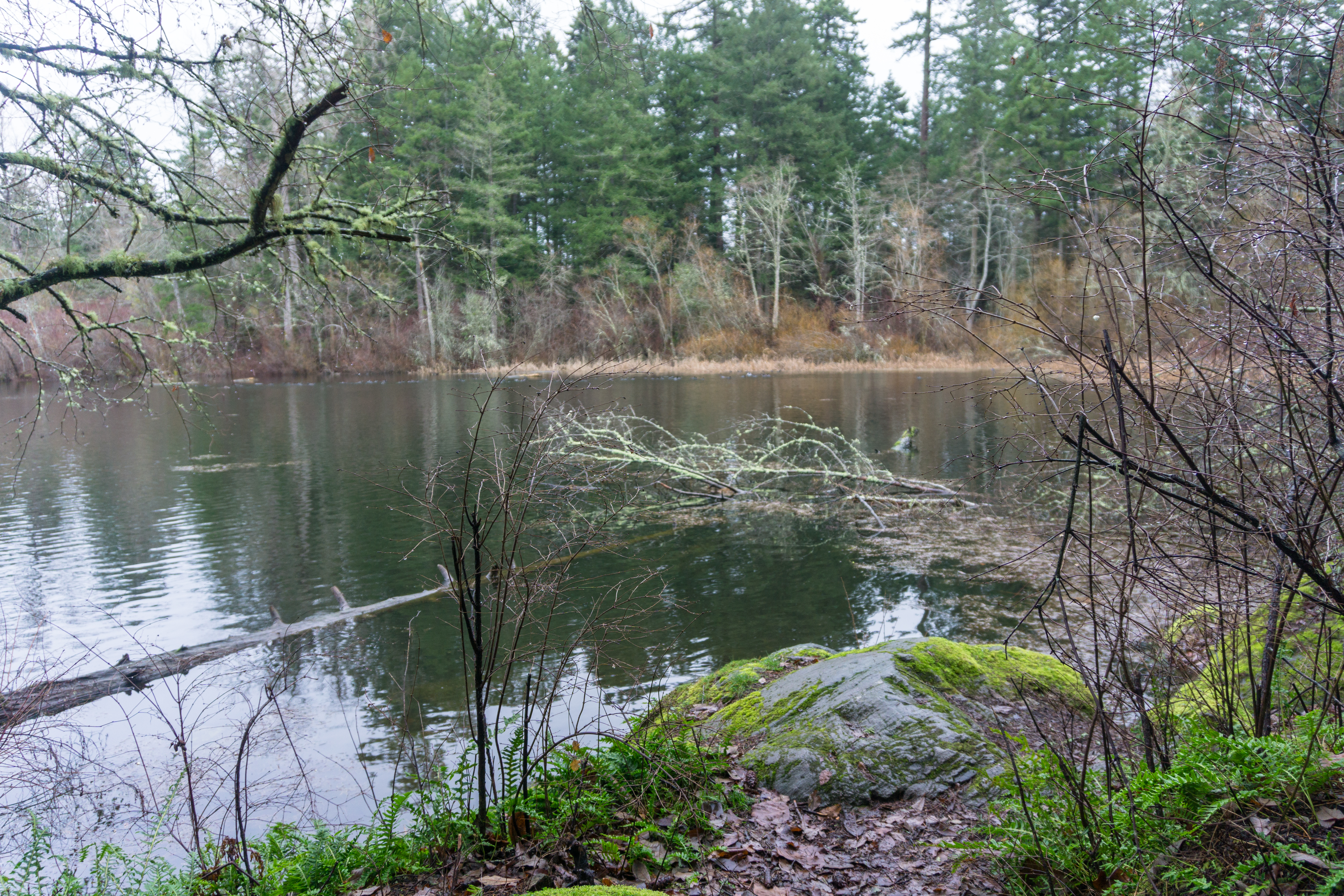
- Elk Lake
- Interactive map of Elk/Beaver Lake Regional Park
- Nearest city: Saanich, British Columbia
- Area: 1,072-acre (434 ha)

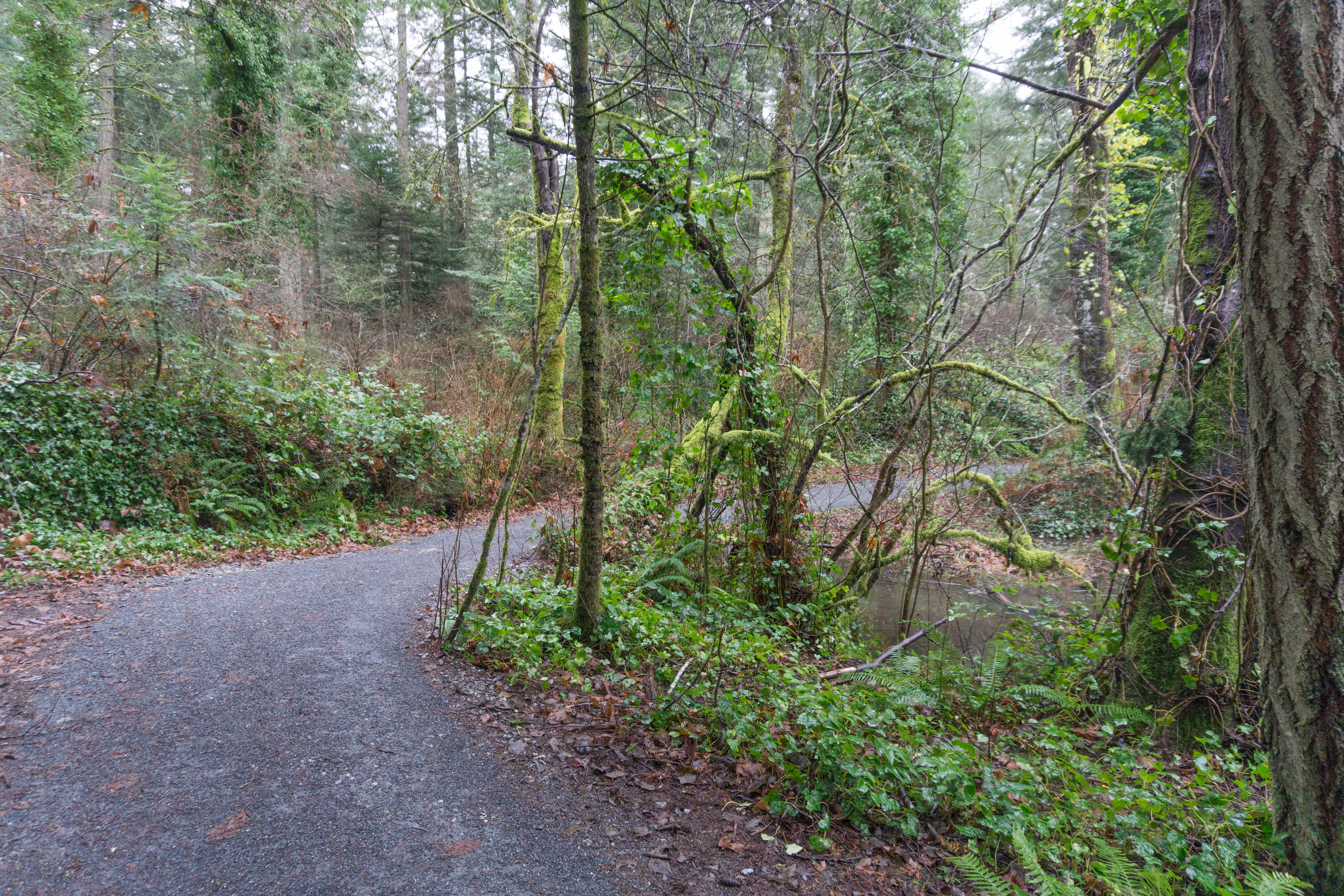
A path through Elk/Beaver Lake Regional Park

The Elk/Beaver Regional Park is a 1,072-acre (434 ha) park in Saanich, British Columbia, containing Elk Lake and Beaver Lake.

Elk/Beaver Lake was known as the "Freshwater Playground of Victoria" in its heyday, the 1930s and 1940s. However, with the completion of the Pat Bay highway in the 1950s, focus turned "green" and measures were taken to start restoring the park to its natural state and protecting it. In 1966 Elk/Beaver Lake became a regional park.

== History ==
Ownership and jurisdiction over the land of the Saanich Peninsula and many other areas are disputed between the Coast Salish people and the governments of Canada and British Columbia. One of the supposed "Douglas Treaties" in this area was blank sheets of paper with no terms whatsoever and "x" marks instead of signatures. Native leaders dispute the claim that this was ever any kind of land transfer document. The vast majority of the lands of British Columbia have never been acquired from the natives by any treaty, not even a blank sheet of paper, which is the reason why there are ongoing negotiations under the auspices of the British Columbia Treaty Process. In Canada, Section 25 of the Constitution of Canada and the Royal Proclamation of 1763 require that lands can only be acquired from the natives by a formal treaty between the crown and the native nation involved and no other process. This is also the process under international law and it has not happened.

Both before and after the government of the Colony of British Columbia joined confederation to become part of Canada, the government of British Columbia claimed that native land was government property and fell under the jurisdiction of the province of British Columbia despite the fact that this contradicts the Canadian Constitution and the Royal Proclamation of 1763. This issue has not yet been resolved.

In 1873, foundation stones were laid to construct a dam at the south end of Beaver Lake so that the two lakes could eventually be used as a drinking water supply for the city of Victoria. Two years later water started flowing from the lakes into Victoria, and the previous supply company, the Spring Ridge Water Works Company, was dissolved. However, by the turn of the century population growth in Victoria meant that the water supply from the lakes was inadequate. From 1913 to 1915, the Sooke Flowline was constructed to draw city water from the new Sooke Reservoir.

== Current day ==
Today, the park is managed by the Capital Regional District. Because it is protected area, it does not serve as a residential area. It is home to many species of wildlife. Plant species include breadroot (a rare species and is also known as slender woollyheads), licorice ferns, yellow pond lilies, cattail reeds, cottonwood, pacific crabapple, red alder, Douglas fir, and western red cedar. Some common animal species are: mergansers, Canada geese, buffleheads, bald eagles, osprey, rainbow trout, smallmouth bass, pumpkinseed sunfish, river otters, red-winged blackbirds, Savannah sparrows, Columbia black-tailed deer, red-legged frogs, yellow warblers, chestnut-backed chickadees, screech owl, and the giant bullfrog, which is an invasive species and a huge concern.

The equestrian centre is located on the west side of the lake. Fishers are a common sight on Elk/Beaver Lake. With no camping allowed, families come out for a Saturday morning hike on the easy trails around the lake or a Sunday picnic and swim at one of the beaches. A 10 km trail around Elk and Beaver Lakes is popular with the local running community; it serves as the course for a yearly ultramarathon series. The Victoria City Rowing Club boathouse is located on the southeast corner of Elk Lake.

== Natural Features ==
=== Islands ===
Elk/Beaver lake features three small named islands situated near the southern end of Beaver Lake. These islands are Kaitlin Island, Perry Island, and Isaac Island. Kaitlin Island is the largest, with a maximum diameter of 190 metres. Perry Island is smaller with a maximum diameter of 78 metres, and Isaac Island, the smallest, with a maximum diameter of 47 metres. There are also 3 to 4 additional, unnamed, smaller islands - depending on water level.

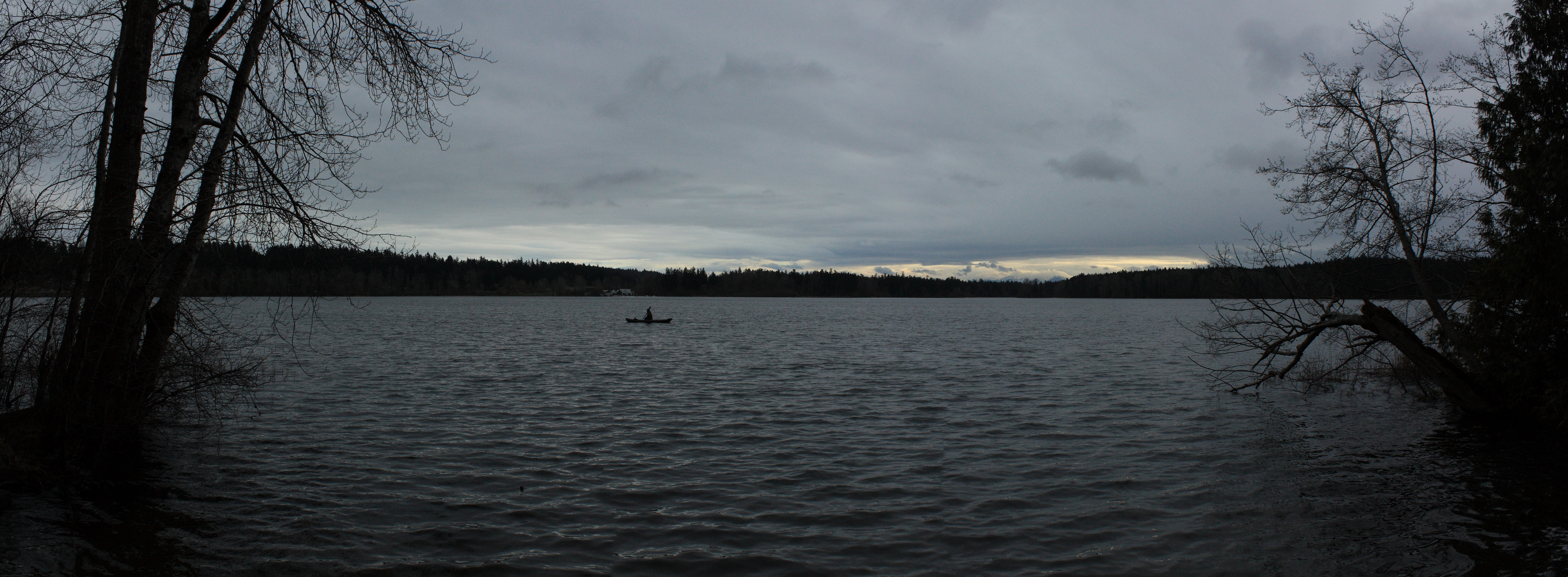
Elk/Beaver Lake Regional Park in February 2013

== See also ==
- Victoria and Sidney Railway
