= Henry Aitken (cricketer) =

English cricketer (1831–1915)

Personal information
- Full name: Henry Mortlock Aitken
- Born: 8 January 1831; Hadley Wood, Middlesex, England
- Died: 12 August 1915 (aged 84); Eastbourne, Sussex, England
- Batting: Unknown
- Bowling: Unknown
- Relatives: James Aitken (brother)

Domestic team information
- Years: Team
- 1853: Oxford University

Career statistics
Competition	First-class
Matches	5
Runs scored	109
Batting average	15.57
100s/50s	–/–
Top score	30*
Balls bowled	?
Wickets	10
Bowling average	?
5 wickets in innings	–
10 wickets in match	–
Best bowling	3/?
Catches/stumpings	2/–
- Source: Cricinfo, 26 April 2014

Henry Mortlock Aitken (8 January 1831 – 12 August 1915) was an English cricketer active in the 1850s.

== Life ==
Born at Hadley Wood, Middlesex, Aitken was the son of James Aitken M.D. He was educated at Eton College, where he captained the college cricket team, and at Exeter College, Oxford.

Aitken made his debut in first-class cricket for Oxford University Cricket Club against Marylebone Cricket Club in 1853, playing two further matches for the university in that year against Cambridge University and in the return match against the MCC at Lord's. He also made two further first-class appearances in 1853, playing once each for the Gentlemen of England against the Gentlemen of Kent, and for the Gentlemen in the Gentlemen v Players fixture. A batsman and bowler of unknown-handedness, Aitken scored 109 runs with a high score of 30 not out, while with the ball he took 10 wickets.

He died at Eastbourne, Sussex on 12 August 1915. His brother James Aitken was a clergyman and sportsman who also played first-class cricket.
