= Harold Backer =

Canadian rower

Personal information
- Born: 20 November 1962 (age 63) Selkirk, Manitoba, Canada

Sport
- Sport: Rowing
Medal record
Representing Canada
Summer Universiade
Bronze medal – third place	1987 Zagreb	Coxed fours

Harold Backer (born 20 November 1962) is a Canadian former Olympic rower and financial advisor.

== Olympic rowing ==
He participated in three Olympic Games for the Canadian rowing team at the 1984, 1988 and 1992 in Barcelona.

After retirement as an Olympic athlete, he became a rowing coach.

== Financial advisor and disappearance ==
Backer established financial advisory firm Financial Backer Corp. In 2015 he disappeared after allegedly setting up a pyramid scheme that ran into trouble. His disappearance caused a B.C. wide search at the time, and was covered in an episode of The Fifth Estate.

In April 2017 he turned himself in to the police.

== See also ==
- Victoria City Rowing Club
