= William Yatman =

English rower, barrister and artist (1819–1913)

William Hamilton Yatman (6 April 1819 – 13 January 1913) was an English rower, barrister and artist.

== Biography ==
Yatman was born in the parish of St Clement's-in-the-Strand in central London, the second son of W. Yatman, a solicitor of London and his wife Ellen Mitchell, daughter of John Mitchell. He was educated at Winchester College where he was in the cricket XI – scoring 11 against Harrow School which was the highest in the match for either side, and 2 and 1 against Eton College. He was admitted to Gonville and Caius College, Cambridge on 31 May 1837 and distinguished himself as a rower. He rowed in the winning Cambridge crew in the Boat Race in 1839. In 1841 and 1842, he rowed in the Cambridge Subscription Rooms eight which won the Grand Challenge Cup at Henley Royal Regatta in both years.

Yatman was admitted at the Inner Temple on 16 January 1840 and was called to the Bar on 22 November 1844. In 1864 he acquired Highgrove House which over a century later became the home of Charles, Prince of Wales. He was a J.P. for Gloucestershire, Warwickshire and Wiltshire.

In the 1890s, Yatman paid for the rebuilding of the spire of St Mary the Virgin Church in Tetbury in memory of his son, on condition that there was an unobstructed view of the spire from the front of Highgrove House. Yatman used to complain about the drunkenness and immorality associated with the historic Mop Fair at Tetbury and called for it to be stopped. However, in 1893 there was a disastrous fire at Highgrove and afterwards he sold the property.

Yatman was also a painter who created illustrations of natural history subjects. In 1905 he gave £1000 to found the Yatman exhibition at Caius College. His coat of arms was placed in the west window of the hall.

Yatman died at Bournemouth at the age of 93.

== See also ==
- List of Cambridge University Boat Race crews
