= Sooke Lake =

Natural lake in British Columbia, Canada

- Location within Vancouver Island
- Location: Vancouver Island, British Columbia, Canada
- Coordinates: 48°33′20.1″N 123°41′49.2″W
- Type: Natural lake, Reservoir
- Primary inflows: Rithet Creek
- Islands: Exploration Island and numerous others

Sooke Lake is a natural lake and the main reservoir of Greater Victoria in British Columbia, Canada. It is owned and operated by the Capital Regional District and supplies water to approximately 350,000 people. It has a usable water supply of 92.7 million cubic meters, of a total of 160.32 million cubic meters. Rithet Creek is the main inflow and makes up approximately 25% of the supply. The total watershed area is 8,620 hectares (21,300 acres).

== History ==
The development of Sooke Lake as a reservoir was approved in 1910, and construction began in 1912. A concrete dam was constructed and raised the water level 3.7 metres (12 ft). Water was transported to the city of Victoria via the Sooke Flowline, a 44 kilometres (27 mi) concrete aqueduct. The project was completed in 1915.

== See also ==
- List of lakes of British Columbia
- Sooke Flowline
- Timeline of the Greater Victoria Water System
