= James Aitken (priest) =

English clergyman and sportsman

James Aitken (9 May 1829 – 26 January 1908) was an English clergyman and sportsman who excelled in cricket, rowing and athletics.

Aitken was born at Monken Hadley, then in Middlesex, the son of John Aitken and his wife Harriet. He was educated at Eton College where he played cricket in the Eton XI. He went on to Exeter College, Oxford, matriculating in 1847, and graduating B.A. in 1851 and M.A. in 1854.

Aitken played in the Oxford XI, including the Varsity matches against Cambridge in 1848, 1849, and 1850, and captained the team in 1850. In 1849, he also rowed in the Oxford boat in the Boat Race. In 1850, he was in the Oxford eight that won the Grand Challenge Cup and the coxed four that won the Stewards' Challenge Cup at Henley Royal Regatta. In 1851, he partnered Joseph William Chitty to win Silver Goblets at Henley. Aitken was also an athlete and at Oxford won the mile race, came second in the two miles race and was described as favourite at 2 to 1 in the Steeplechese.

Aitken was ordained after leaving the university. In 1853, he played cricket for Harlequins and between 1855 and 1857 played for Gentlemen of Kent teams. In due course, he became the vicar of Chorleywood, Hertfordshire. It was said that few of the younger people could hold their own against him at lawn tennis. In 1869 Aitken responded to Dr J Morgan, who was investigating the health effects of rowing.

Your letter reached me at a most opportune time, as I was in company with my old friend Mr J. Chitty, and we at once discussed the subject of it together; we both agreed that rowing and training had not done us the very slightest harm, and what is more, we could not remember any one of our old Oxford boating friends who had suffered from it. So far from considering training to be dangerous, I believe that most men would be infinitely the better for it.

Aitken died at Hove at the age of 78. His brother Henry Aitken also played cricket for Oxford.

== See also ==
- List of Oxford University Boat Race crews
