= Martin Steffes-Mies =

German rower (born 1967)

Personal information
- Born: 12 January 1967 (age 59)
- Height: 199 cm (6 ft 6 in)
- Weight: 95 kg (209 lb)

Sport
- Sport: Rowing
- Club: Mainzer RV
Medal record
Men's rowing
World Rowing Championships
Representing West Germany
Gold medal – first place	1989 Bled	Eight
Gold medal – first place	1990 Tasmania	Eight
Representing Germany
Gold medal – first place	1991 Vienna	Eight
Gold medal – first place	1993 Račice	Eight

Martin Steffes-Mies (born 12 January 1967) is a retired German rower.

== Early life ==
Steffes-Mies was born in 1967. His father was the rower Josef Steffes-Mies who was part of the West German contingent on the United Team of Germany at the 1964 Summer Olympics.

== Rowing career ==
Steffes-Mies junior joined the Mainzer RV. At a height of 199 centimetres (78 in) and a weight of 95 kilograms (209 lb) he had a good physical stature for a rowing career. At the 1988 national German rowing championships he won bronze with his coxed four team. A year later, he became German champion in this boat class alongside Dirk Balster, Ansgar Wessling, Roland Baar, and Manfred Klein as cox. The five teamed up with the coxless four that won the national champions and as an eight, they won a second national title in 1989. They were thus nominated as the German eight ("Deutschland Achter") that would contest the 1989 World Rowing Championships in Bled, Yugoslavia, where they won gold. In 1990, Steffes-Mies again won the German championships in the coxed four and the eight, with Frank Richter having replaced Wessling in both boats and Frank Dietrich being the only member of the 1989 coxless four still in the team. That eight defended its world championship title at the 1990 World Rowing Championships in Tasmania, Australia. In 1991, Steffes-Mies won the German championships in the eight for the third consecutive year. Jürgen Hecht and Wolfgang Klapheck, who had won the national coxless pair title, joined the eight for the 1991 World Rowing Championships in Vienna, Austria; for the third consecutive year they brought home the world championship title. This was the first year that they represented a reunified Germany.

In 1992, Steffes-Mies was chosen as a reserve for the German eight for the Barcelona Olympics. The Olympic team members could not contest the German nationals as dates overlapped. The German eight won a bronze medal but Steffes-Mies did not get to compete. He commented 20 years later that having missed out competing at the Olympics brings back painful memories.

In 1993, Steffes-Mies was back with the eight that won the German championships. The same team then won gold at the 1993 World Rowing Championships at Račice in the Czech Republic. In 1994, Steffes-Mies won his last German championship with the eight. At the 1994 World Rowing Championships at Indianapolis, United States, he came fourth with his team.

Since March 2014, Steffes-Mies has been president of the Mainzer RV.

== Professional career ==
Steffes-Mies studied engineering management with a view of taking over his father's construction and road building company. After finishing his degree, he spent a year working at Hochtief. During the next year working for a local road building company, he was promoted to construction manager. In deviation from his original plan, he became a management consultant with strategy consulting firm Roland Berger. He then worked for prefabricated house manufacturer Kampa where he joined the board.

In 2005, he did take over his father's company and immediately amalgamated it with the company of a business partner; the joint company had 350 employees. In October 2010, they sold their company to the construction company Strabag.

== Personal life ==
Steffes-Mies is married with three children.
