= Victoria City Rowing Club =

Coordinates: 48.525268°N 123.389098°W

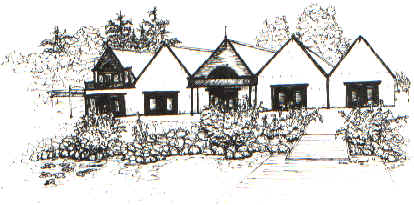
- Location: Elk Lake, Victoria, British Columbia, Canada
- Home water: Elk Lake
- Founded: 1952
- Affiliations: Rowing Canada
- Website: www.vcrc.bc.ca

The Victoria City Rowing Club is a non-profit rowing club located at Elk Lake in Victoria, British Columbia, Canada.

VCRC offers a variety of recreational and seasonal rowing programs and services including programs for beginners, corporate retreats, customized training camps, and private coaching. There are three classes of membership: Junior (individuals under 19 yrs), Senior (individuals over 18 yrs), and Masters (27+). The other seasonal programs include: Youth Learn to Row, Youth Rec Rowing, Youth Summer Camps, Adult Learn to Row, Adult Rec Rowing, Novice Masters, and Community Corporate Rowing Challenge.

The colours of the VCRC uniform are green, white, and black. The uniform features a green top with a white 'V' on the back and the club logo on the front, with black bottoms. The oars have a white blade and a green chevron or 'V' on both sides. The white 'V' on the uniforms and the green 'V' or chevron on the oars are symbolic of the 'V' in Victoria.

The Victoria City Rowing Club is one of four member user groups that comprise the Victoria Rowing Society (VRS) that use the Elk Lake facility. Other members of VRS are: The Greater Victoria Youth Rowing Society (GVYRS) that comprises eight middle and secondary schools; Rowing Canada Aviron (RCA); and the University of Victoria.

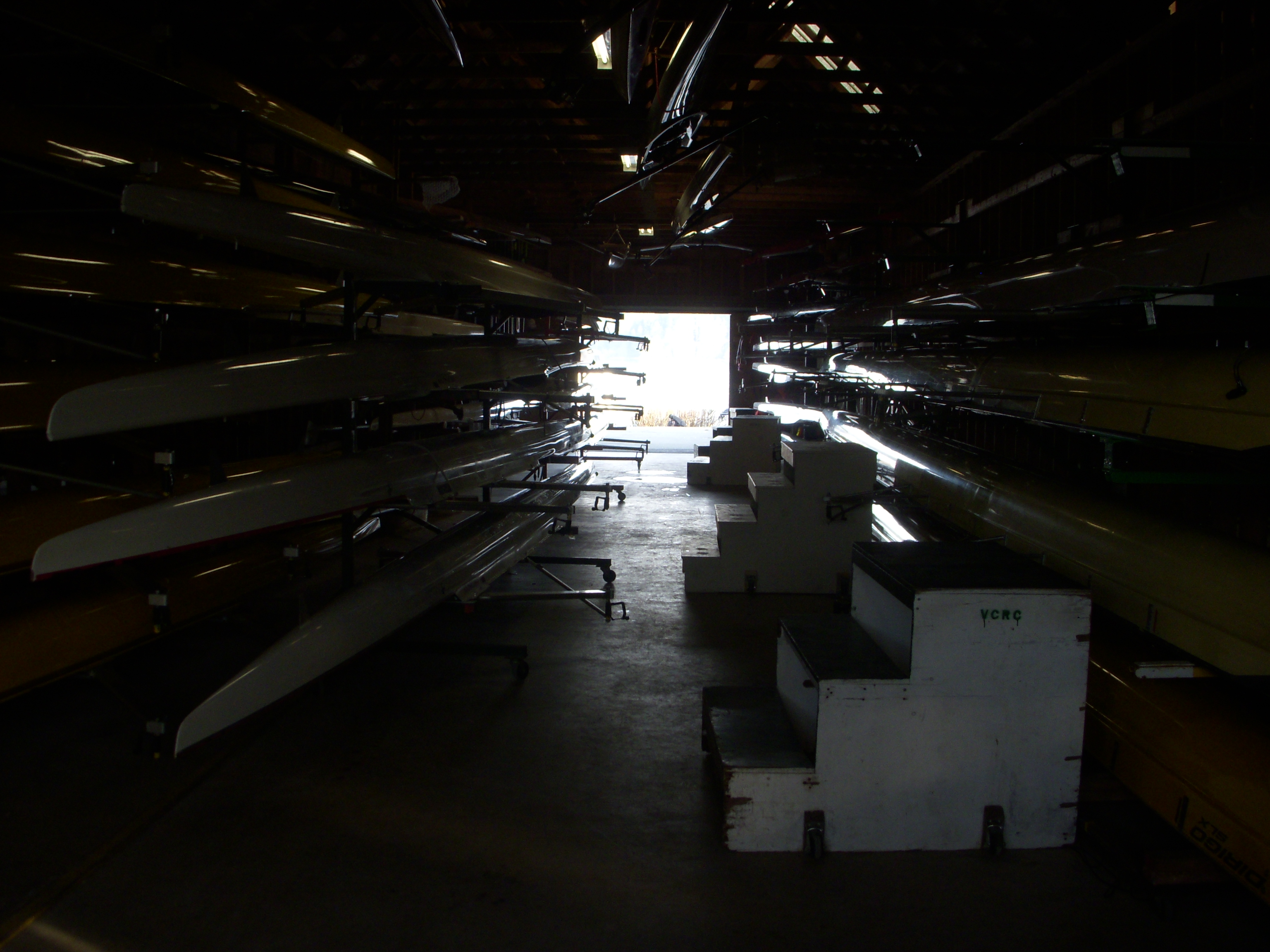
The Eight and Doubles Bay of the Victoria City Rowing Club.

Row of VCRC oars at a regatta.

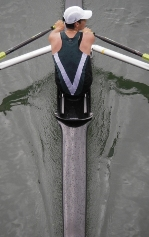
Uniform of Victoria City Rowing Club.

== Notable Olympians ==
1956 Summer Olympics

- Lorne Loomer

1960 Summer Olympics

- Lorne Loomer
- David Anderson

1964 Summer Olympics

- Leif Gotfredsen

1984 Summer Olympics

- Tim Storm
- Harold Backer
- Silken Laumann
- Lisa Roy
- Janice Mason
- Andrea Schreiner

1988 Summer Olympics

- Pat Newman
- Silken Laumann
- Harold Backer
- John Wallace
- Terry Paul
- Patrick Walter

1992 Summer Olympics

- Brenda Taylor
- Silken Laumann
- Harold Backer
- John Wallace
- Terry Paul

1996 Summer Olympics

- Adam Parfitt
- Phil Graham
- Gavin Hassett
- Theresa Luke
- Pat Newman
- Silken Laumann

2000 Summer Olympics

- Iain Brambell
- Adam Parfitt
- Gavin Hassett
- Phil Graham
- Kristen Wall
- Theresa Luke

2004 Summer Olympics

- Kevin Light
- Iain Brambell
- Anna-Marie de Zwager
- Gavin Hassett
- David Calder

2008 Summer Olympics

- Kevin Light
- Iain Brambell
- Meghan Montgomery
- Anna-Marie de Zwager
- Malcolm Howard
- David Calder

2012 Summer Olympics

- Patricia Obee
- Lindsay Jennerich
- Jeremiah Brown

== Honours ==
=== Henley Royal Regatta ===
Year	Races won
2002	Grand Challenge Cup
2003	Grand Challenge Cup, Stewards' Challenge Cup
2007	Grand Challenge Cup
2008	Grand Challenge Cup
