= Dirk Balster =

German rower (born 1966)

Medal record

Men's rowing

World Championships

Representing West Germany
Gold medal – first place	1989 Bled	M8+
Gold medal – first place	1990 Tasmania	M8+

Representing Germany
Gold medal – first place	1991 Vienna	M8+

Dirk Peter Balster (born 19 July 1966, in Gütersloh) is a German rower. He finished 4th in the coxless four at the 1992 Summer Olympics.
