= Elk Lake (British Columbia) =

Lake in BC, Canada

Elk and Beaver Lakes
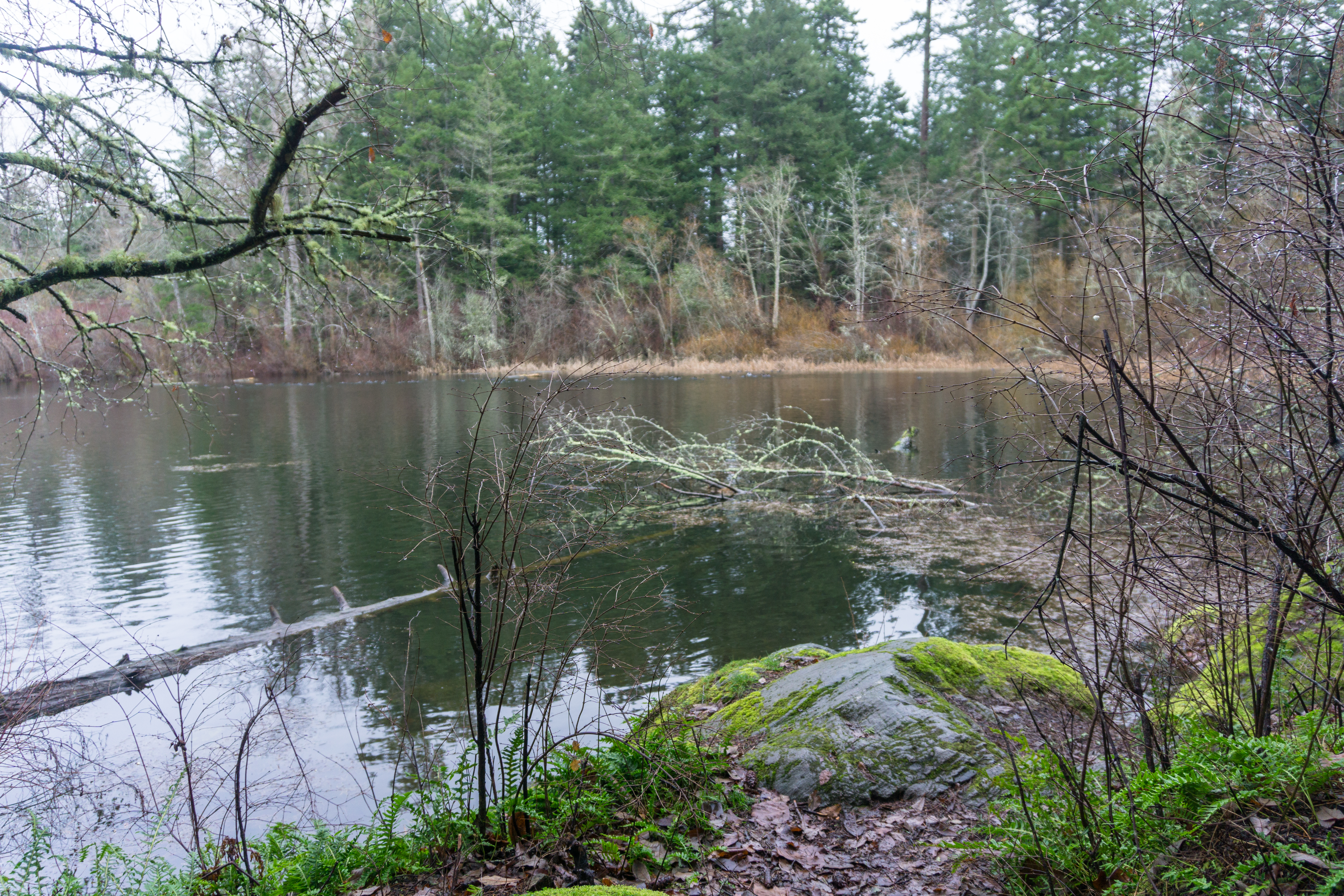

- Location within British Columbia
- Location: Saanich, British Columbia
- Coordinates: 48.525°N 123.396°W
- Primary inflows: O'Donnel Creek
- Primary outflows: Colquitz Creek
- Catchment area: 11.5 km^{2} (4.4 sq mi)
- Basin countries: Canada
- Surface area: 2.46 km^{2} (0.95 sq mi) (Elk Lake, Beaver Lake, Elk-Beaver channel)
- Max. depth: 17.9 m (59 ft)
- Residence time: 4.4 years (Elk Lake), 0.25 years (Beaver Lake)

Elk Lake is a large lake located in Elk/Beaver Lake Regional Park in Saanich, British Columbia. Elk Lake and Beaver Lake are actually one lake as a shallow channel connects them. Elk/Beaver lake was known as the "Freshwater Playground of Victoria" in its heyday, the 1930s and 1940s. However, with the completion of the Pat Bay highway in the 1950s, focus turned to environmentalism, and measures were taken to start restoring the park to its natural state and protecting it. In 1966 Elk/Beaver lake became a regional park.

== See also ==
- List of lakes of British Columbia
