= Rowing at the 1988 Summer Olympics – Men's coxed pair =

Olympic rowing event

Men's coxed pair at the Games of the XXIV Olympiad
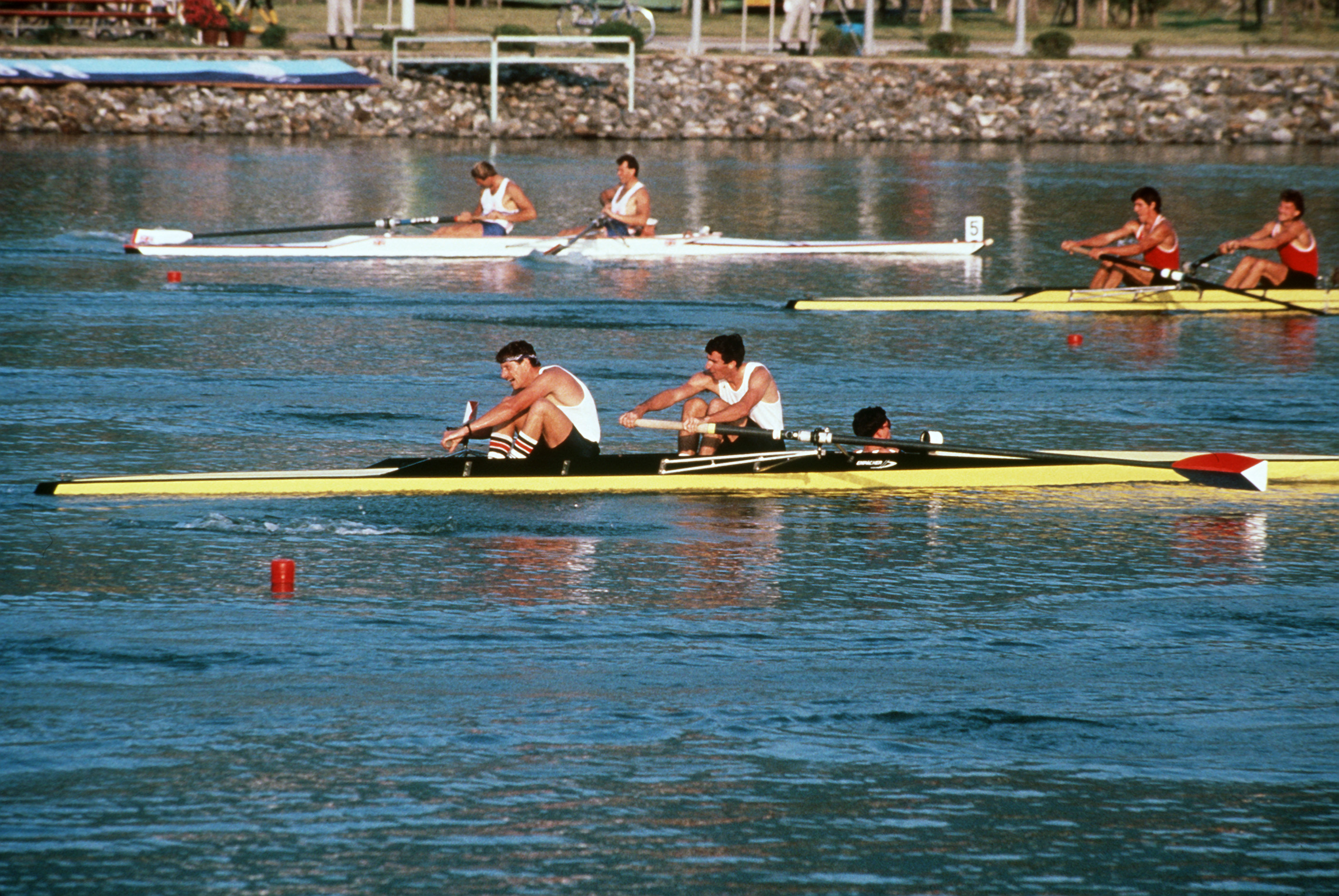
- A race during the competition; the United States team is in the foreground
- Venue: Misari Regatta
- Dates: 20–25 September 1988
- Competitors: 42 from 14 nations
- Winning time: 6:58.79

Medalists
1st place, gold medalist(s)		Carmine Abbagnale; Giuseppe Abbagnale; Giuseppe Di Capua (cox); Italy
2nd place, silver medalist(s)		Mario Streit; Detlef Kirchhoff; René Rensch (cox); East Germany
3rd place, bronze medalist(s)		Andy Holmes; Steve Redgrave; Patrick Sweeney (cox); Great Britain

The men's coxed pair competition at the 1988 Summer Olympics took place at Misari Regatta, South Korea. It was held from 20 to 25 September. There were 14 boats (42 competitors) from 14 nations, with each nation limited to a single boat in the event. The event was won by Italian crew Carmine Abbagnale, Giuseppe Abbagnale, and coxswain Giuseppe Di Capua; they were the second crew to repeat as Olympic gold medalists (and would go on to be the only crew to win three medals with a silver in 1992). It was Italy's fourth victory in the event, most all-time among nations over the United States and East Germany at three. The East Germans, after winning their three gold medals consecutively from 1972 to 1980 before missing the 1984 Games due to the Soviet-led boycott, returned with a silver medal performance in Seoul by Mario Streit, Detlef Kirchhoff, and cox René Rensch. Great Britain took its first-ever medal in the event with a bronze by Andy Holmes, Steve Redgrave, and cox Patrick Sweeney.

== Background ==
This was the 17th appearance of the event. Rowing had been on the programme in 1896 but was cancelled due to bad weather. The men's coxed pair was one of the original four events in 1900, but was not held in 1904, 1908, or 1912. It returned to the programme after World War I and was held every Games from 1924 to 1992, when it (along with the men's coxed four) was replaced with the men's lightweight double sculls and men's lightweight coxless four.

Eight of the 18 competitors from the 1984 coxed pair Final A returned: the full Italian gold medalist crew of Carmine Abbagnale, Giuseppe Abbagnale, and Giuseppe Di Capua; the two rowers from the silver-medal Romanian crew, Dimitrie Popescu and Vasile Tomoiagă (this time joined by the 1980 fourth-place team coxswain Ladislau Lovrenschi; American bronze-medal rower Robert Espeseth; and rower Ángelo Roso Neto and coxswain Nilton Alonço from the fourth-place Brazil team. The Italian trio had been rowing together for two full Olympic cycles, earning 4 golds, a silver, and a bronze in the 6 World Championships from 1981 through 1983 and 1985 through 1987 along with their Olympic gold. The other two World champion nations during that time were East Germany (1983, sending a different crew) and Great Britain (whose Andy Holmes, Steve Redgrave, and cox Patrick Sweeney had won in 1986). The Romanian rowers had taken a silver (1985) and bronze (1987) at Worlds before teaming with Lovrenschi.

New Zealand made its debut in the event. The United States made its 14th appearance, matching the absent France for most among nations to that point.

== Competition format ==
The coxed pair event featured three-person boats, with two rowers and a coxswain. It was a sweep rowing event, with the rowers each having one oar (and thus each rowing on one side). The course used the 2000 metres distance that became the Olympic standard in 1912.

The competition consisted of three main rounds (heats, semifinals, and finals) as well as a repechage. The 14 boats were divided into three heats for the first round, with 4 or 5 boats in each heat. The top three boats in each heat (9 boats total) advanced directly to the semifinals. The remaining 5 boats were placed in the repechage. The repechage featured a single heat, with the top three boats advancing to the semifinals and the remaining 2 boats (4th and 5th placers in the repechage) being eliminated (13th and 14th place overall). The 12 semifinalist boats were divided into two heats of 6 boats each. The top three boats in each semifinal (6 boats total) advanced to the "A" final to compete for medals and 4th through 6th place; the bottom three boats in each semifinal were sent to the "B" final for 7th through 12th.

== Schedule ==
All times are Korea Standard Time adjusted for daylight savings (UTC+10)

Date	Time	Round
Tuesday, 20 September 1988	10:32	Quarterfinals
Wednesday, 21 September 1988	14:56	Repechage
Thursday, 22 September 1988	17:54	Semifinals
Friday, 23 September 1988	11:04	Final B
Sunday, 25 September 1988	10:57	Final A

== Results ==
=== Quarterfinals ===
The quarterfinals were held on September 20. It was a sunny but cool day (14 °C for the first heat, rising steadily to 16 °C for the third), with fairly calm winds (less than 1 m/s for each heat). The top three boats in each heat advanced to the semifinals, with all others going to the repechage. No boats were eliminated in this round.

==== Quarterfinal 1 ====
Bulgaria led early, including by nearly a second at the halfway mark, but the East German team had a strong second half and passed Bulgaria for the lead. The other three teams had already started separate by 500 metres; at 1500 metres, 7 seconds separated New Zealand in third place (the last semifinal advancement spot) from Canada in fourth place. Canada and fifth-place Brazil did narrow the distance somewhat in the final 500 metres, but the gap was insurmountable.

Rank	Rowers	Coxswain	Nation	Time	Notes
1	Detlef Kirchhoff; Mario Streit	René Rensch	East Germany	7:11.24	Q
2	Atanas Andreev; Emil Groytsev	Stefan Stoykov	Bulgaria	7:15.24	Q
3	Greg Johnston; Chris White	Andrew Bird	New Zealand	7:22.32	Q
4	Ian McKerlich; Dave Ross	Pat Newman	Canada	7:25.18	R
5	Flávio de Melo; Ángelo Roso Neto	Nilton Alonço	Brazil	7:27.68	R

==== Quarterfinal 2 ====
The top three boats jockeyed for position, while Poland and Ireland never threatened to break into the advancing group. The Americans held the lead at the 500 metre and 1000 metre marks. Yugoslavia was in second at the 500 metre point, but was passed by the Soviets before halfway. The Soviets captured the lead from the United States in the third quarter of the course, and Yugoslavia passed the Americans as well in the final 500 metre stretch.

Rank	Rowers	Coxswain	Nation	Time	Notes
1	Roman Kazantsev; Andrey Korikov	Andrey Lipsky	Soviet Union	7:12.96	Q
2	Milan Janša; Sašo Mirjanič	Roman Ambrožič	Yugoslavia	7:14.96	Q
3	Robert Espeseth; Daniel Lyons	Jon Fish	United States	7:17.36	Q
4	Wojciech Jankowski; Jacek Streich	Ireneusz Omięcki	Poland	7:21.89	R
5	Pat McDonagh; Frank Moore	Liam Williams	Ireland	7:33.16	R

==== Quarterfinal 3 ====
The final heat was not competitive in terms of who would advance; Czechoslovakia fell behind early and only increased the gap as the race went on. The top thee boats remained relatively tightly packed, with Italy building up a small lead (1.6 seconds over Great Britain and 2.3 seconds over Romania) through the first 1500 metres and holding off late pushes from the other two teams in the last 500 metres to maintain a narrow win. Less than a second separated first from third at the finish.

Rank	Rowers	Coxswain	Nation	Time	Notes
1	Carmine Abbagnale; Giuseppe Abbagnale	Giuseppe Di Capua	Italy	7:03.55	Q
2	Andy Holmes; Steve Redgrave	Patrick Sweeney	Great Britain	7:04.04	Q
3	Dimitrie Popescu; Vasile Tomoiagă	Ladislau Lovrenschi	Romania	7:04.48	Q
4	Jan Kabrhel; Milan Škopek	Jiří Pták	Czechoslovakia	7:26.53	R

=== Repechage ===
The repechage was held on September 21. It was a sunny and warmer day (22.3 °C), with 1.1 m/s west-northwest wind. The top three boats advanced to the semifinals, while 4th and 5th place were eliminated (13th and 14th overall). Brazil fell significantly behind early. Ireland stayed within a second of third place through the 1500 metre mark, but could not maintain the pace in the last 500 metres and fell back from the lead group—and even behind Brazil, which pushed hard to avoid last place. Within the lead group, Poland held the lead at halfway but Czechoslovakia had a strong second half to pull away to a wide margin of victory. Canada, in third the entire race, made an effort to catch Poland for second at the end but came up short.

Rank	Rowers	Coxswain	Nation	Time	Notes
1	Jan Kabrhel; Milan Škopek	Jiří Pták	Czechoslovakia	7:14.17	Q
2	Wojciech Jankowski; Jacek Streich	Ireneusz Omięcki	Poland	7:18.21	Q
3	Ian McKerlich; Dave Ross	Pat Newman	Canada	7:18.60	Q
4	Flávio de Melo; Ángelo Roso Neto	Nilton Alonço	Brazil	7:21.31	
5	Pat McDonagh; Frank Moore	Liam Williams	Ireland	7:23.87	

=== Semifinals ===
The semifinals were held on September 22. It was a warm, sunny day (23 °C), with winds of 1.6 m/s west-northwest in the first heat calming to 1.1 m/s west for the second. The top three boats in each heat advanced to the "A" final, with the bottom three eliminated from medal contention and placed in the "B" consolation final (except for New Zealand, which withdrew).

==== Semifinal 1 ====
New Zealand withdrew. Italy led wire-to-wire, recording the best time in the event in Olympic history. The East Germans and Romanians battled for second place, with East Germany prevailing over the second half. Neither Yugoslavia nor Poland had much chance at breaking into the top three, finishing 9 and 13 seconds out of third, respectively.

Rank	Rowers	Coxswain	Nation	Time	Notes
1	Carmine Abbagnale; Giuseppe Abbagnale	Giuseppe Di Capua	Italy	6:56.62	QA
2	Detlef Kirchhoff; Mario Streit	René Rensch	East Germany	6:58.08	QA
3	Dimitrie Popescu; Vasile Tomoiagă	Ladislau Lovrenschi	Romania	7:00.36	QA
4	Milan Janša; Sašo Mirjanič	Roman Ambrožič	Yugoslavia	7:09.45	QB
5	Wojciech Jankowski; Jacek Streich	Ireneusz Omięcki	Poland	7:13.48	QB
6	Greg Johnston; Chris White	Andrew Bird	New Zealand	DNS	

==== Semifinal 2 ====
The second semifinal was a five-way race for three spots in the "A" final through the halfway mark. Bulgaria had the lead from the start, with the Soviets, Brits, Americans, and Czechoslovaks fairly close behind. Canada was over 3 seconds out of fifth place at that point, and while the Canadians had a better second half than first, they would not come close to reaching the top three. In the third quarter of the race, Czechoslovakia and especially the United States fell off the pace of the lead group; Czechoslovakia passed the Americans but saw their gap to third place Great Britain widen to 3 seconds. The Brits made a charge in the final quarter of the race, passing the Soviets and nearly catching Bulgaria; the latter team held them off, though, and won by 0.28 seconds. Canada caught their southern neighbors in the last 500 metres, as well.

Rank	Rowers	Coxswain	Nation	Time	Notes
1	Atanas Andreev; Emil Groytsev	Stefan Stoykov	Bulgaria	7:01.23	QA
2	Andy Holmes; Steve Redgrave	Patrick Sweeney	Great Britain	7:01.51	QA
3	Roman Kazantsev; Andrey Korikov	Andrey Lipsky	Soviet Union	7:01.78	QA
4	Jan Kabrhel; Milan Škopek	Jiří Pták	Czechoslovakia	7:04.20	QB
5	Ian McKerlich; Dave Ross	Pat Newman	Canada	7:06.21	QB
6	Robert Espeseth; Daniel Lyons	Jon Fish	United States	7:07.05	QB

=== Finals ===
==== Final B ====
The "B" final for 7th through 11th place (with only 5 boats due to New Zealand's semifinal withdrawal) was held on September 23, with 16.9 °C cloudy weather and a 1 m/s east-southeast wind. Czechoslovakia led from the start, increasing the margin over each 500 metre stretch. Yugoslavia held second place throughout. The United States held third place through the first half of the race but once again had a slow third quarter, allowing Poland to overtake them. Canada—just as it had in the semifinals—finished strong, passing the Americans once again in the final quarter and nearly catching Poland for third place.

Rank	Rowers	Coxswain	Nation	Time
7	Jan Kabrhel; Milan Škopek	Jiří Pták	Czechoslovakia	7:11.30
8	Milan Janša; Sašo Mirjanič	Roman Ambrožič	Yugoslavia	7:15.82
9	Wojciech Jankowski; Jacek Streich	Ireneusz Omięcki	Poland	7:18.60
10	Ian McKerlich; Dave Ross	Pat Newman	Canada	7:18.89
11	Robert Espeseth; Daniel Lyons	Jon Fish	United States	7:24.18

==== Final A ====
The final was held on September 25, a sunny day with 17.2 °C temperatures and 2.2 m/s northeast winds. It was dominated by Italy, which jumped to an over 2 second lead at 500 metres and never was seriously challenged. Bulgaria kept closest through most of the race, second place at each of the quarter, half, and three-quarter marks, but could not maintain their speed in the final quarter. The East Germans jumped from fifth to second in the final stretch; Great Britain and Romania each passed Bulgaria but were passed by East Germany to hold the third and fourth places they had held since halfway. The Soviets had been competitive early (third through 500 metres) but fell to sixth by 100 metres and were well out of any contention for better than that.

Rank	Rowers	Coxswain	Nation	Time
1st place, gold medalist(s)	Carmine Abbagnale; Giuseppe Abbagnale	Giuseppe Di Capua	Italy	6:58.79
2nd place, silver medalist(s)	Detlef Kirchhoff; Mario Streit	René Rensch	East Germany	7:00.63
3rd place, bronze medalist(s)	Andy Holmes; Steve Redgrave	Patrick Sweeney	Great Britain	7:01.95
4	Dimitrie Popescu; Vasile Tomoiagă	Ladislau Lovrenschi	Romania	7:02.60
5	Atanas Andreev; Emil Groytsev	Stefan Stoykov	Bulgaria	7:03.04
6	Roman Kazantsev; Andrey Korikov	Andrey Lipsky	Soviet Union	7:06.07

== Final classification ==
Rank	Rowers	Coxswain	Nation
1st place, gold medalist(s)	Carmine Abbagnale; Giuseppe Abbagnale	Giuseppe Di Capua	Italy
2nd place, silver medalist(s)	Mario Streit; Detlef Kirchhoff	René Rensch	East Germany
3rd place, bronze medalist(s)	Andy Holmes; Steve Redgrave	Patrick Sweeney	Great Britain
4	Dimitrie Popescu; Vasile Tomoiagă	Ladislau Lovrenschi	Romania
5	Emil Groytsev; Atanas Andreev	Stefan Stoykov	Bulgaria
6	Andrey Korikov; Roman Kazantsev	Andrey Lipsky	Soviet Union
7	Jan Kabrhel; Jiří Pták	Milan Škopek	Czechoslovakia
8	Roman Ambrožič; Milan Janša	Sašo Mirjanič	Yugoslavia
9	Wojciech Jankowski; Ireneusz Omięcki	Jacek Streich	Poland
10	Ian McKerlich; Pat Newman	Dave Ross	Canada
11	Robert Espeseth; Jon Fish	Daniel Lyons	United States
12	Andrew Bird; Greg Johnston	Chris White	New Zealand
13	Nilton Alonço; Flávio de Melo	Ángelo Roso Neto	Brazil
14	Pat McDonagh; Frank Moore	Liam Williams	Ireland
