= Rowing at the 1984 Summer Olympics – Men's coxed pair =

Men's coxed pair at the Games of the XXIII Olympiad
- Rowing pictogram
- Venue: Lake Casitas
- Dates: 31 July – 5 August 1984
- Competitors: 36 from 12 nations
- Winning time: 7:05.99

Medalists
1st place, gold medalist(s)		Carmine Abbagnale; Giuseppe Abbagnale; Giuseppe Di Capua (cox); Italy
2nd place, silver medalist(s)		Dimitrie Popescu; Vasile Tomoiagă; Dumitru Răducanu (cox); Romania
3rd place, bronze medalist(s)		Kevin Still; Robert Espeseth; Doug Herland (cox); United States

The men's coxed pair competition at the 1984 Summer Olympics took place at Lake Casitas, California, United States. It was held from 31 July to 5 August. There were 12 boats (36 competitors) from 12 nations, with each nation limited to a single boat in the event. The event was won by the Italian crew, brothers Carmine Abbagnale and Giuseppe Abbagnale and coxswain Giuseppe Di Capua. It was Italy's first victory in the event since 1968 and third overall, tying the United States and East Germany for most among nations to that point. The Abbagnale brothers and Di Capua would go on to repeat as champions in 1988 (the second crew to repeat) and take silver in 1992 (the only crew to earn three medals together; Conn Findlay was the only other individual to earn three medals, doing so with three different rowing partners and two coxswains). The Romanian crew of Dimitrie Popescu, Vasile Tomoiagă, and cox Dumitru Răducanu took silver (the nation's first medal in the event since 1972). Americans Kevin Still, Robert Espeseth, and cox Doug Herland took bronze (the nation's first medal in the event since 1964). The three-Games gold-medal streak for East Germany ended with that nation joining the Soviet-led boycott.

== Background ==
This was the 16th appearance of the event. Rowing had been on the programme in 1896 but was cancelled due to bad weather. The men's coxed pair was one of the original four events in 1900, but was not held in 1904, 1908, or 1912. It returned to the programme after World War I and was held every Games from 1924 to 1992, when it (along with the men's coxed four) was replaced with the men's lightweight double sculls and men's lightweight coxless four.

With the Soviet-led boycott keeping out many of the top nations in the event (including three-time reigning gold medalists East Germany as well the Soviets themselves, silver medalists the last two Games), only 1 of the 18 competitors from the 1980 coxed pair Final A returned: Zlatko Celent, a rower from the bronze medalist Yugoslavia crew. Seventh-place finishers Italy brought back two of their three crew members, rower Giuseppe Abbagnale and coxswain Giuseppe Di Capua, swapping out Antonio Dell'Aquila to include Abbagnale's brother Carmine Abbagnale. This crew had taken gold at the 1981 and 1982 World Championships as well as bronze at the 1983 Worlds (behind an East German and a Soviet crew). The Italian trio was heavily favoured given the boycott.

No nations made their debut in the event. France made its 14th appearance, most among nations to that point.

== Competition format ==
The coxed pair event featured three-person boats, with two rowers and a coxswain. It was a sweep rowing event, with the rowers each having one oar (and thus each rowing on one side). The course used the 2000 metres distance that became the Olympic standard in 1912. The competition consisted of two main rounds (semifinals and finals) as well as a repechage after the semifinals. The competition consisted of two main rounds (heats and finals) as well as a repechage. The 12 boats were divided into two heats for the first round, with 6 boats in each heat. The winner of each heat advanced directly to the "A" final (1st through 6th place). The remaining 10 boats were placed in the repechage. The repechage featured two heats, with 5 boats in each heat. The top two boats in each repechage heat went to the "A" final. The remaining 6 boats (3rd, 4th, and 5th placers in the repechage heats) competed in the "B" final for 7th through 12th place.

== Schedule ==
All times are Pacific Daylight Time (UTC-7)

Date	Time	Round
Tuesday, 31 July 1984		Semifinals
Thursday, 2 August 1984		Repechage
Friday, 3 August 1984		Final B
Sunday, 5 August 1984		Final A

== Results ==
=== Semifinals ===
The semifinals were held on July 31. It was a warm day (23 °C) with a 1 m/s east-northeast wind. The winner of each heat advanced to the A final, with all others going to the repechage. No boats were eliminated in this round.

==== Semifinal 1 ====
Romania led throughout, taking a five second lead by the halfway mark and winning by over five and a half seconds. The Yugoslav, American, and West German boats (in that order) were close together through 1000 metres (less than half a second between second and fourth), but separated over the second half of the race. France and Peru were close neither to the lead group nor to each other throughout the course of the contest.

Rank	Rower	Coxswain	Nation	Time	Notes
1	Dimitrie Popescu Vasile Tomoiagă	Dumitru Răducanu	Romania	7:12.18	QA
2	Robert Espeseth; Kevin Still	Doug Herland	United States	7:17.80	R
3	Dieter Göpfert; Hermann Greß	Rudolf Ziegler	West Germany	7:25.02	R
4	Zlatko Celent; Dario Vidošević	Mirko Ivančić	Yugoslavia	7:27.28	R
5	Jean-Pierre Bremer; Charles Imbert	Christophe Chevrier	France	7:32.20	R
6	Alfredo Montenegro; Francisco Viacava	Arturo Valentín	Peru	7:44.73	R

==== Semifinal 2 ====
As with the first heat, there was little question which boat would win the second heat. Italy led early and finished with a five-second win. Indeed, the final positions of the boats were established by 500 metres; the order did not change at the 1000 metre mark, 1500 metre mark, or the finish.

Rank	Rower	Coxswain	Nation	Time	Notes
1	Carmine Abbagnale; Giuseppe Abbagnale	Giuseppe Di Capua	Italy	7:13.83	QA
2	Ángelo Roso Neto; Walter Soares	Nilton Alonço	Brazil	7:18.96	R
3	Adrian Genziani; Bill Lang	Alan Inns	Great Britain	7:20.51	R
4	Harold Backer; Tony Zasada	Tan Barkley	Canada	7:24.52	R
5	José Manuel Bermúdez; Isidro Martín	Joaquín Sabriá	Spain	7:29.30	R
6	Guy Defraigne; William Defraigne	Philippe Cuelenaere	Belgium	7:32.93	R

=== Repechage ===
The repechage was held on August 2. It was a warm day (24 °C for the first heat, 23 °C for the second) with no wind. The top two boats in each heat advanced to the "A" final, with all others going to the "B" final (out of medal contention).

==== Repechage heat 1 ====
The British boat started off strong, leading at the quarter-mark. By halfway, however, the two teams from North America had moved into the lead, with Canada edging the United States by 0.2 seconds at 1000 metres. At 1500 metres, it was clear that the two teams from the Americas would advance, as they opened a five-second lead over the Europeans. The United States took the lead from Canada in the third 500 metres and held it over the fourth. France passed Great Britain in the fourth quarter, as well. Peru had been close over the first 500 metres but fell well behind all others by halfway, finishing 12 seconds out of fourth place.

Rank	Rower	Coxswain	Nation	Time	Notes
1	Robert Espeseth; Kevin Still	Doug Herland	United States	7:22.88	QA
2	Harold Backer; Tony Zasada	Tan Barkley	Canada	7:23.74	QA
3	Jean-Pierre Bremer; Charles Imbert	Christophe Chevrier	France	7:26.98	QB
4	Adrian Genziani; Bill Lang	Alan Inns	Great Britain	7:38.20	QB
5	Alfredo Montenegro; Francisco Viacava	Arturo Valentín	Peru	7:50.40	QB

==== Repechage heat 2 ====
The second repechage heat was a three-way race for the two advancement spots through the first three-quarters of the contest. Brazil took a close lead at the 500 metre mark, followed by West Germany and Yugoslavia. That order reversed at the 1000 metre point, and Yugoslavia looked to have an advancement place when they opened the lead over third-place Brazil to 2.5 seconds at 1500 metres. But the Yugoslav rowers could not keep the pace and faltered in the final quarter, Brazil came charging ahead, and the final order flipped back to the first-quarter order: Brazil, West Germany, Yugoslavia. The final 500 metres was so poor for Yugoslavia that they finished 8 seconds out of second place. Spain and Belgium battled for fourth place over the first half, but Spain took a significant lead by the 1500 metre mark and Belgium was unable to close.

Rank	Rower	Coxswain	Nation	Time	Notes
1	Ángelo Roso Neto; Walter Soares	Nilton Alonço	Brazil	7:19.40	QA
2	Dieter Göpfert; Hermann Greß	Rudolf Ziegler	West Germany	7:20.75	QA
3	Zlatko Celent; Dario Vidošević	Mirko Ivančić	Yugoslavia	7:28.26	QB
4	José Manuel Bermúdez; Isidro Martín	Joaquín Sabriá	Spain	7:42.23	QB
5	Guy Defraigne; William Defraigne	Philippe Cuelenaere	Belgium	7:46.67	QB

=== Finals ===
==== Final B ====
The consolation or "B" final, for 7th through 12th place, took place on August 3. It was a warm day (23 °C) with a 0.5 m/s east wind. Yugoslavia, which had come close to joining the "A" final, led from wire to wire, winning the race to take 7th place overall. Great Britain pressed them closely for a while, but fell further behind over the middle 1000 metres and finished 8th overall about 2 seconds behind Yugoslavia. France, Spain, and Belgium followed in a small group well behind the two leaders. Peru stayed with that group over the first 500 metres but could not keep pace and fell behind to finish in last place by 17 seconds.

Rank	Rower	Coxswain	Nation	Time
7	Zlatko Celent; Dario Vidošević	Mirko Ivančić	Yugoslavia	7:25.60
8	Adrian Genziani; Bill Lang	Alan Inns	Great Britain	7:27.56
9	Jean-Pierre Bremer; Charles Imbert	Christophe Chevrier	France	7:32.48
10	José Manuel Bermúdez; Isidro Martín	Joaquín Sabriá	Spain	7:34.38
11	Guy Defraigne; William Defraigne	Philippe Cuelenaere	Belgium	7:35.67
12	Alfredo Montenegro; Francisco Viacava	Arturo Valentín	Peru	7:52.59

==== Final A ====
Italy, just as it did in the second heat, led early and finished with a five-second win. The Americans and Romanians battled for silver and bronze, with the latter team holding the lead the whole way; the United States was within a second of Romania at 1500 metres but fell behind in the final 500 to a 1.6 second defeat. The race for fourth place was also close, with West Germany leading Brazil and Canada at the 500, 1000, and 1500 metre marks but unable to keep pace over the last quarter and falling to sixth. Brazil pulled away from Canada as well in the last 500 metres.

Rank	Rower	Coxswain	Nation	Time
1st place, gold medalist(s)	Carmine Abbagnale; Giuseppe Abbagnale	Giuseppe Di Capua	Italy	7:05.99
2nd place, silver medalist(s)	Dimitrie Popescu Vasile Tomoiagă	Dumitru Răducanu	Romania	7:11.21
3rd place, bronze medalist(s)	Robert Espeseth; Kevin Still	Doug Herland	United States	7:12.81
4	Ángelo Roso Neto; Walter Soares	Nilton Alonço	Brazil	7:17.07
5	Harold Backer; Tony Zasada	Tan Barkley	Canada	7:18.98
6	Dieter Göpfert; Hermann Greß	Rudolf Ziegler	West Germany	7:25.16

== Final classification ==
Rank	Rowers	Country
1st place, gold medalist(s)	Carmine Abbagnale; Giuseppe Abbagnale; Giuseppe Di Capua	Italy
2nd place, silver medalist(s)	Dimitrie Popescu; Vasile Tomoiagă; Dumitru Răducanu	Romania
3rd place, bronze medalist(s)	Kevin Still; Robert Espeseth; Doug Herland	United States
4	Walter Soares; Ángelo Roso Neto; Nilton Alonço	Brazil
5	Harold Backer; Tony Zasada; Tan Barkley	Canada
6	Hermann Greß; Dieter Göpfert; Rudolf Ziegler	West Germany
7	Dario Vidošević; Zlatko Celent; Mirko Ivančić	Yugoslavia
8	Adrian Genziani; Bill Lang; Alan Inns	Great Britain
9	Charles Imbert; Jean-Pierre Bremer; Christophe Chevrier	France
10	Isidro Martín; José Manuel Bermúdez; Joaquín Sabriá	Spain
11	William Defraigne; Guy Defraigne; Philippe Cuelenaere	Belgium
12	Alfredo Montenegro; Francisco Viacava; Arturo Valentín	Peru
