= Gazzetta Sports Awards =

Sports award

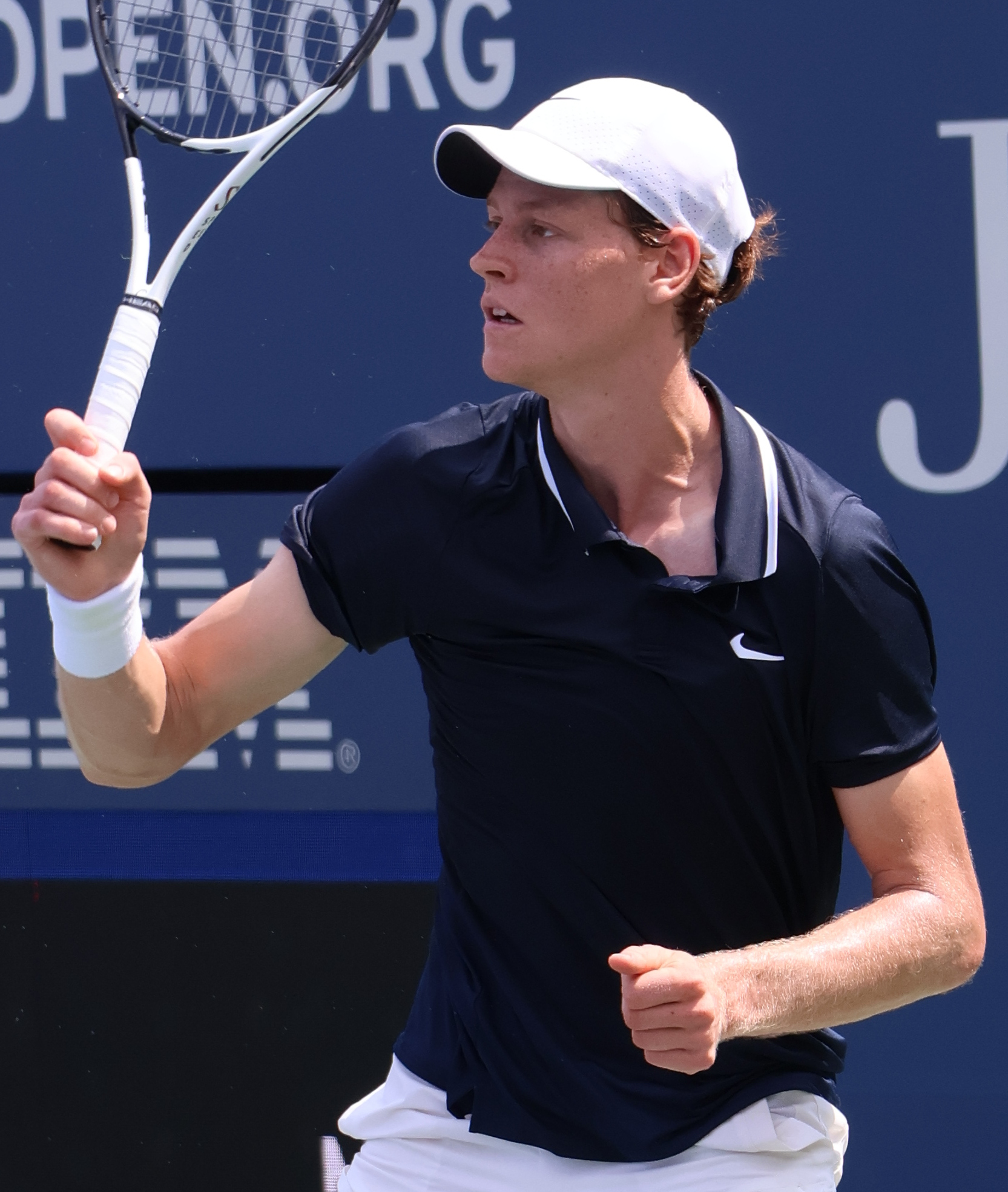
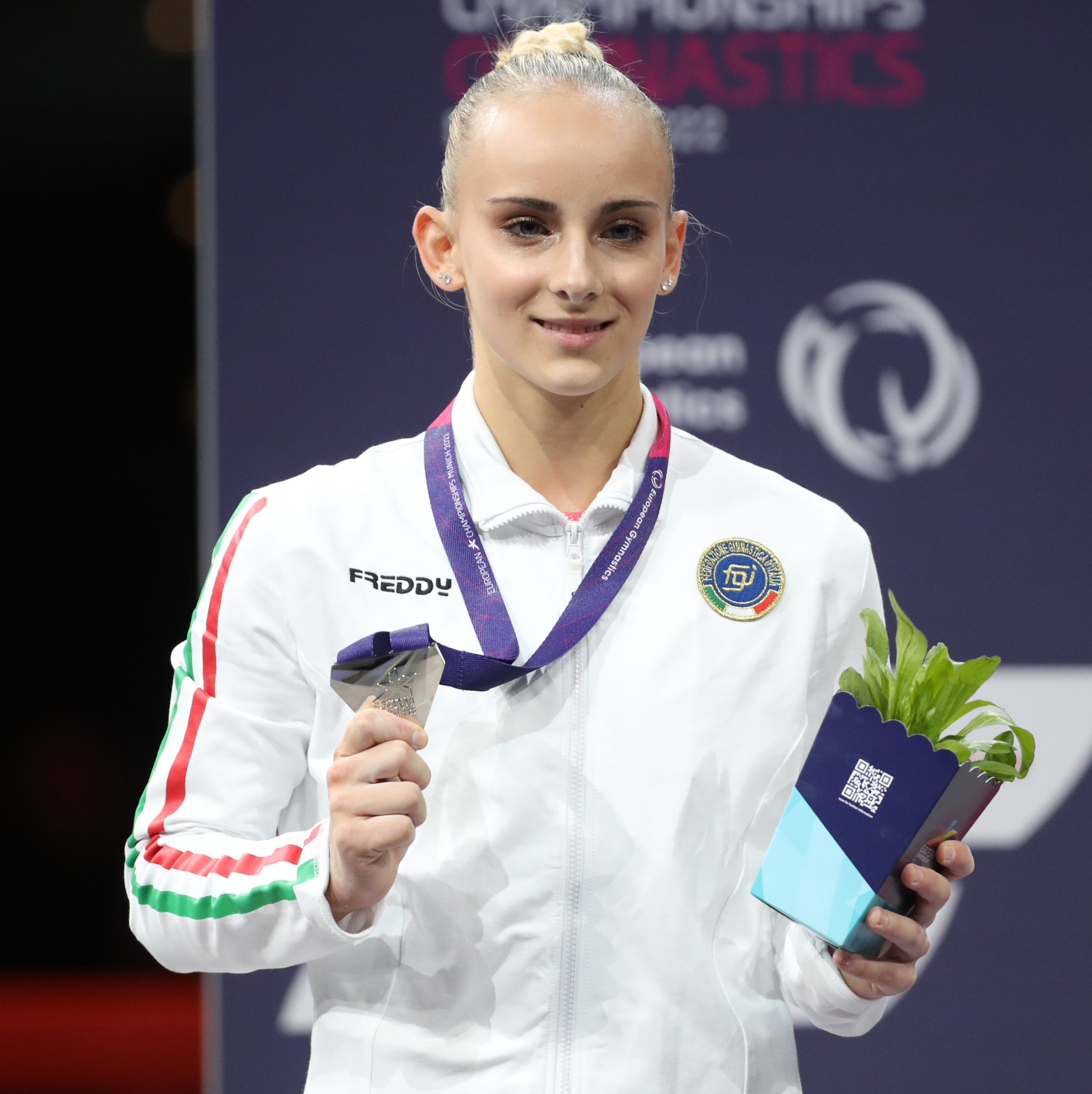
Jannik Sinner and Alice D'Amato, the 2024 Italian sportsman and sportswoman of the year.

The Gazzetta Sports Awards and the Gazzetta Referendum are surveys conducted annually by the Italian sports newspaper La Gazzetta dello Sport to reward the best sportsmen and sportswomen of the calendar year.

== Winners ==
=== Italian ===
Year	Sportman of the Year	Sport	Sportwoman of the Year	Sport	Team of the Year	Sport	Ref.
1978	Paolo Rossi	Football	Sara Simeoni (Note: Winner in both Italian and worldwide categories.)	Athletics (high jump)	Italy national football team	Football	
1979	Pietro Mennea	Athletics (sprinting)	Roberta Felotti	Swimming	Milan	Football	
1980	Pietro Mennea	Athletics (sprinting)	Sara Simeoni	Athletics (high jump)	Italy national basketball team	Basketball	
1981	Marco Lucchinelli	Motorcycle racing	Sara Simeoni	Athletics	Carmine Abbagnale, Giuseppe Abbagnale, Giuseppe Di Capua	Rowing	
1982	Giuseppe Saronni	Cycling	Dorina Vaccaroni	Fencing	Italy national football team	Football	
1983	Alberto Cova	Athletics	Dorina Vaccaroni	Fencing	Italy national basketball team	Basketball	
1984	Francesco Moser	Cycling	Sara Simeoni	Athletics	Carmine Abbagnale, Giuseppe Abbagnale, Giuseppe Di Capua	Rowing	
1985	Alberto Cova	Athletics	Maria Canins	Cycling	Juventus	Football	
1986	Reinhold Messner	Mountaineering	Maria Canins	Cycling	Italy men's national water polo team	Water polo	
1987	Francesco Panetta	Athletics	Manuela Dalla Valle	Swimming	Tracer Milano	Basketball	
1988	Alberto Tomba	Alpine skiing	Laura Fogli	Athletics	Carmine Abbagnale, Giuseppe Abbagnale, Giuseppe Di Capua	Rowing	
1989	Giorgio Lamberti	Swimming	Angela Bandini	Freediving	Milan	Football	
1990	Gianni Bugno	Cycling	Annarita Sidoti	Athletics	Italy men's national volleyball team	Volleyball	
1991	Gianni Bugno	Cycling	Giovanna Trillini	Fencing	Carmine Abbagnale, Giuseppe Abbagnale, Giuseppe Di Capua	Rowing	
1992	Alberto Tomba	Alpine skiing	Giovanna Trillini	Fencing	Italy men's national water polo team	Water polo	
1993	Jury Chechi	Gymnastics	Stefania Belmondo	Cross-country skiing	Italy men's national water polo team	Water polo	
1994	Alberto Tomba	Alpine skiing	Manuela Di Centa	Cross-country skiing	Maurilio De Zolt, Marco Albarello, Giorgio Vanzetta, Silvio Fauner	Cross-country skiing	
1995	Alberto Tomba	Alpine skiing	Fiona May	Athletics	Italy men's national volleyball team	Volleyball	
1996	Jury Chechi	Gymnastics	Deborah Compagnoni	Alpine skiing	Juventus	Football	
1997	Jury Chechi	Gymnastics	Deborah Compagnoni	Alpine skiing	Italy national basketball team	Basketball	
1998	Marco Pantani	Cycling	Deborah Compagnoni	Alpine skiing	Italy men's national volleyball team	Volleyball	
1999	Fabrizio Mori	Athletics	Stefania Belmondo	Cross-country skiing	Italy national basketball team	Basketball	
2000	Domenico Fioravanti	Swimming	Valentina Vezzali	Fencing	Ferrari	Formula 1	
2001	Valentino Rossi	Motorcycle racing	Valentina Vezzali	Fencing	Ferrari	Formula 1	
2002	Valentino Rossi	Motorcycle racing	Stefania Belmondo	Cross-country skiing	Italy women's national volleyball team	Volleyball	
2003	Valentino Rossi	Motorcycle racing	Valentina Vezzali	Fencing	Ferrari	Formula 1	
2004	Stefano Baldini	Athletics	Valentina Vezzali	Fencing	Ferrari	Formula 1	
2005	Filippo Magnini	Swimming	Valentina Vezzali	Fencing	Italy men's national volleyball team	Volleyball	
2006	Filippo Magnini	Swimming	Vanessa Ferrari	Gymnastics	Italy national football team	Football	
2007	Filippo Magnini	Swimming	Valentina Vezzali	Fencing	Milan	Football	
2008	Valentino Rossi	Motorcycle racing	Federica Pellegrini	Swimming	Inter	Football	
2009	Valentino Rossi	Motorcycle racing	Federica Pellegrini	Swimming	Italy women's national volleyball team	Volleyball	
2010	Giuliano Razzoli	Alpine skiing	Francesca Schiavone	Tennis	Inter	Football	
2011	Armin Zöggeler	Luge	Federica Pellegrini	Swimming	Italy men's national water polo team	Water polo	
2012	Alex Zanardi	Paracycling	Elisa Di Francisca	Fencing	Elisa Di Francisca, Arianna Errigo, Valentina Vezzali, Ilaria Salvatori	Fencing	
2013	Vincenzo Nibali	Cycling	Jessica Rossi	Shooting	Juventus	Football	
2014	Vincenzo Nibali	Cycling	Tania Cagnotto	Diving	Sara Errani and Roberta Vinci	Tennis	
2015	Gregorio Paltrinieri	Swimming	Flavia Pennetta	Tennis	Juventus	Football	
2016	Gregorio Paltrinieri	Swimming	Tania Cagnotto	Diving	Italy men's national volleyball team	Volleyball	
2017	Gianluigi Buffon	Football	Sofia Goggia	Alpine skiing	Juventus	Football	
2018	Filippo Tortu	Sprinting	Sofia Goggia	Alpine skiing	Italy women's national volleyball team	Volleyball	
2019	Roberto Mancini	Football	Federica Pellegrini	Swimming	Italy men's national water polo team	Water polo	
2020	Ciro Immobile	Football	Federica Brignone	Alpine skiing	Atalanta	Football	
2021	Marcell Jacobs	Athletics (sprinting)	Antonella Palmisano	Athletics (racewalking)	Italy national football team	Football	
2022	Marcell Jacobs	Athletics (sprinting)	Benedetta Pilato	Swimming	Milan	Football	
2023	Gianmarco Tamberi	Athletics (high jump)	Sofia Raffaeli	Rhythmic gymnastics	Napoli	Football	
2024	Jannik Sinner	Tennis	Alice D'Amato	Artistic gymnastics	Inter	Football	
2024	Jannik Sinner	Tennis	Alice D'Amato	Artistic gymnastics	Alberta Santuccio, Giulia Rizzi, Rossella Fiamingo, Mara Navarria	Fencing	
2025	Lorenzo Musetti	Tennis	Paola Egonu	Volleyball	Italy Davis Cup team	Tennis	

=== Worldwide ===
Year	Sportman of the Year	Sport	Sportwoman of the Year	Sport	Team of the Year	Sport	Ref.
1978	(Kenya) Henry Rono	Athletics (track and field)	(Italy) Sara Simeoni	Athletics (high jump)	Argentina national football team	Football	
1979	(United Kingdom) Sebastian Coe	Athletics (track and field)	(United States) Mary T. Meagher	Swimming	Soviet Union national football team	Football	
1980	(Italy) Pietro Mennea	Athletics (sprinting)	(Soviet Union) Tatyana Kazankina	Athletics (track and field)	Germany national football team	Football	
1981	(United Kingdom) Sebastian Coe	Athletics (track and field)	(Soviet Union) Olga Bicherova	Artistic gymnastics	(Soviet Union) Olga Bicherova, Yelena Davydova, Maria Filatova, Elena Polevaya, Stella Zakharova	Artistic gymnastics	
1982	(United Kingdom) Daley Thompson	Athletics (decathlon)	(East Germany) Marita Koch	Athletics (sprinting)	Italy national football team	Football	
1983	(United States) Carl Lewis	Athletics (track and field)	(Soviet Union) Tamara Bykova	Athletics (high jump)	Australia II team	Sailing	
1984	(United States) Carl Lewis	Athletics (track and field)	(United States) Valerie Brisco-Hooks	Athletics (track and field)	(Sweden) Stefan Edberg, Anders Järryd, Henrik Sundström, Mats Wilander	Tennis	
1985	(Soviet Union) Sergey Bubka	Athletics (pole vault)	(East Germany) Marita Koch	Athletics (sprinting)	(Italy) Juventus	Football	
1986	(Argentina) Diego Maradona	Football	(East Germany) Heike Drechsler	Athletics (long jump)	Argentina national football team	Football	
1987	(Canada) Ben Johnson	Athletics (sprinting)	(Germany) Steffi Graf	Tennis	Greece men's national basketball team	Basketball	
1988	(United States) Carl Lewis	Athletics (track and field)	(East Germany) Kristin Otto	Swimming	(United Kingdom) McLaren-Honda	Formula 1	
1989	(United States) Greg LeMond	Cycle sport	(Switzerland) Vreni Schneider	Alpine skiing	(Italy) Milan	Football	
1990	(Sweden) Stefan Edberg	Tennis	(Jamaica) Merlene Ottey	Athletics (sprinting)	Germany national football team	Football	
1991	(United States) Carl Lewis	Athletics (track and field)	(Germany) Katrin Krabbe	Athletics (track and field)	(France) Guy Forget, Henri Leconte	Tennis	
1992	(Spain) Miguel Induráin	Cycle sport	(Hungary) Krisztina Egerszegi	Swimming	United States men's national basketball team	Basketball	
1993	(Spain) Miguel Induráin	Cycle sport	(Hungary) Krisztina Egerszegi	Swimming	(United States) Jon Drummond, Andre Cason, Dennis Mitchell, Leroy Burrell	Athletics (sprinting)	
1994	(United States) Leroy Burrell	Athletics (sprinting)	(Italy) Manuela Di Centa	Cross-country skiing	Brazil national football team	Football	
1995	(Ethiopia) Haile Gebrselassie	Athletics (long-distance running)	(United States) Gwen Torrence	Athletics (sprinting)	Italy men's national volleyball team	Volleyball	
1996	(United States) Michael Johnson	Athletics (sprinting)	(France) Marie-José Pérec	Athletics (sprinting)	(France) Arnaud Boetsch, Guy Forget, Cédric Pioline, Guillaume Raoux	Tennis	
1997	(Denmark) Wilson Kipketer	Athletics (middle-distance running)	(Cuba) Ana Fidelia Quirot	Athletics (track and field)	(France) Williams-Renault	Formula 1	
1998	(Italy) Marco Pantani	Cycle sport	(United States) Marion Jones	Athletics (track and field)	France national football team	Football	
1999	(United States) Lance Armstrong	Cycle sport	(Romania) Gabriela Szabo	Athletics (track and field)	(England) Manchester United	Football	
2000	(Netherlands) Pieter van den Hoogenband	Swimming	(United States) Marion Jones	Athletics (track and field)	France national football team	Football	
2001	(Germany) Michael Schumacher	Formula 1	(Netherlands) Inge de Bruijn	Swimming	(Italy) Scuderia Ferrari	Formula 1	
2002	(Germany) Michael Schumacher	Formula 1	(United States) Serena Williams	Tennis	Brazil national football team	Football	
2003	(United States) Michael Phelps	Swimming	(United Kingdom) Paula Radcliffe	Athletics (long-distance running)	(United Kingdom) England national rugby union team	Rugby	
2004	(United States) Michael Phelps	Swimming	(Italy) Valentina Vezzali	Fencing	Argentina men's national volleyball team	Volleyball	
2005	(Switzerland) Roger Federer	Tennis	(Russia) Yelena Isinbayeva	Athletics (pole vaulting)	New Zealand national rugby union team	Rugby	
2006	(Switzerland) Roger Federer	Tennis	(France) Laure Manaudou	Swimming	Italy national football team	Football	
2007	(Switzerland) Roger Federer	Tennis	(Belgium) Justine Henin	Tennis	South Africa national rugby union team	Rugby	
2008	(Jamaica) Usain Bolt	Athletics (sprinting)	(Russia) Yelena Isinbayeva	Athletics (pole vaulting)	(Jamaica) Nesta Carter, Michael Frater, Usain Bolt, Asafa Powell	Athletics (sprinting)	
2009	(Jamaica) Usain Bolt	Athletics (sprinting)	(Italy) Federica Pellegrini	Swimming	(Spain) Barcelona	Football	
2010	(Portugal) José Mourinho	Football	(United States) Lindsey Vonn	Alpine skiing	Spain national football team	Football	
2011	(Argentina) Lionel Messi	Football	(Italy) Federica Pellegrini	Swimming	(Spain) Barcelona	Football	
2012	(Jamaica) Usain Bolt	Athletics (sprinting)	(United States) Lindsey Vonn	Alpine skiing	Spain national football team	Football	
2013	(Jamaica) Usain Bolt	Athletics (sprinting)	(United States) Serena Williams	Tennis	(Germany) Bayern Munich	Football	
2014	(Italy) Vincenzo Nibali	Cycle sport	(Slovenia) Tina Maze	Alpine skiing	Germany national football team	Football	
2015	(Jamaica) Usain Bolt	Athletics (sprinting)	(Italy) Flavia Pennetta	Tennis	(Spain) Barcelona	Football	
2016	(Jamaica) Usain Bolt	Athletics (sprinting)	(United States) Simone Biles	Artistic gymnastics	(England) Leicester City	Football	
2017	(Switzerland) Roger Federer	Tennis	(Italy) Federica Pellegrini	Swimming	(Spain) Real Madrid	Football	
2018	(United Kingdom) Lewis Hamilton	Formula 1	(United States) Mikaela Shiffrin	Alpine skiing	France national football team	Football	
2019	(Kenya) Eliud Kipchoge	Athletics (long-distance running)	(United States) Mikaela Shiffrin	Alpine skiing	(England) Liverpool	Football	
2019	(Kenya) Eliud Kipchoge	Athletics (long-distance running)	(United States) Mikaela Shiffrin	Alpine skiing	United States women's national soccer team	Football	
2020	(United Kingdom) Lewis Hamilton	Formula 1	(Italy) Federica Brignone	Alpine skiing	(Germany) Bayern Munich	Football	

== Other awards ==
Since 2015, other awards have been given.

Coach of the Year

- 2015: Antonio Conte (association football)
- 2016: Claudio Ranieri (association football)
- 2017: Gian Piero Gasperini (association football)
- 2018: Massimiliano Allegri (association football)
- 2019: Roberto Mancini (association football)
- 2020: Stefano Pioli (association football)
- 2021: Antonio Conte (association football)
- 2022: Ferdinando De Giorgi (volleyball)
- 2023: Luciano Spalletti (association football)
- 2024: Julio Velasco (volleyball)

Performance of the Year

- 2015: Fabio Aru (cycling)
- 2016: Niccolò Campriani (shooting)
- 2017: Andrea Belotti (association football)
- 2018: Mauro Icardi (association football)
- 2019: Jannik Sinner (tennis)
- 2020: Filippo Ganna (cycling)
- 2021: Sonny Colbrelli (cycling)
- 2022: Gregorio Paltrinieri (swimming)
- 2023: Lautaro Martínez (association football)
- 2024: Nicolò Martinenghi (swimming)

Paralympic Athlete of the Year

- 2015: Martina Caironi (paralympic athletics)
- 2016: Beatrice Vio (wheelchair fencing)
- 2017: Italy women's national deaf volleyball team (deaf volleyball)
- 2018: Beatrice Vio (wheelchair fencing) and Oney Tapia (paralympic athletics)
- 2019: Simone Barlaam (paralympic swimming)
- 2020: Briantea 84 Cantù
- 2021: Beatrice Vio (wheelchair fencing)
- 2022: Xenia Palazzo (paralympic swimming)
- 2023: Ambra Sabatini (paralympic athletics)
- 2024: Stefano Raimondi (paralympic swimming) and Carlotta Gilli (paralympic swimming)

Exploit of the Year

- 2015: Roberta Vinci (tennis)
- 2016: Gianluigi Donnarumma (association football)
- 2017: Andrea Dovizioso (motorsport)
- 2018: Elia Viviani (cycling)
- 2019: Charles Leclerc (Formula 1)
- 2020: Jannik Sinner (tennis)
- 2021: Nicolò Barella (association football)
- 2023: Francesco Bagnaia (motorsport) and Italy Davis Cup team (tennis)
- 2024: Atalanta (association football)

Revelation of the Year

- 2018: Simona Quadarella (swimming)
- 2019: Matteo Berrettini (tennis)
- 2020: Enea Bastianini (motorcycle racing) and Larissa Iapichino (long jump)
- 2021: Francesco Bagnaia (motorcycle racing)
- 2022: Yemaneberhan Crippa (long-distance running)
- 2024: Nadia Battocletti (long-distance running)

Most Promising Talent of the Year

- 2018: Francesco Bagnaia (motorsport)
- 2019: Benedetta Pilato (swimming)
- 2024: Mattia Furlani (long jump)

Fair Play of the Year

- 2015: Valentina Diouf (volleyball)
- 2016: Tamara Lunger (ski mountaineering)
- 2017: Matteo Manassero (golf)

Legend

- 2015: Valentino Rossi (motorsport) and Alex Zanardi (paracycling)
- 2016: Federica Pellegrini (swimming) and Alberto Tomba (alpine skiing)
- 2017: Francesco Totti (association football) and Alberto Contador (cycling)
- 2018: Paolo Maldini (association football), Vincenzo Nibali (cycling), and Christian Vieri (association football)
- 2019: Siniša Mihajlović (association football)
- 2020: Zlatan Ibrahimović (association football)
- 2021: Daniele De Rossi (association football)
- 2022: Giacomo Agostini (motorcycle racing), Beatrice Vio (wheelchair fencing), and Vincenzo Nibali (cycling)
- 2023: Fabio Cannavaro (association football) and Massimiliano Rosolino (swimming)
- 2024: Marcello Lippi (association football)

ESport

- 2019: Daniele “Jizuke” Di Mauro

SportWeek Award

- 2019: Italy women's national football team
- 2020: Maxime Mbanda (rugby)
- 2021: Federica Pellegrini (swimming)

Special Award

- 2020: Maxime Mbanda (rugby)

Emotion of the Year

- 2021: Gianmarco Tamberi (high jump)

Giro d'Italia Award

- 2021: Lorenzo Fortunato (cycling)

== Multiwinners ==
=== Italian ===
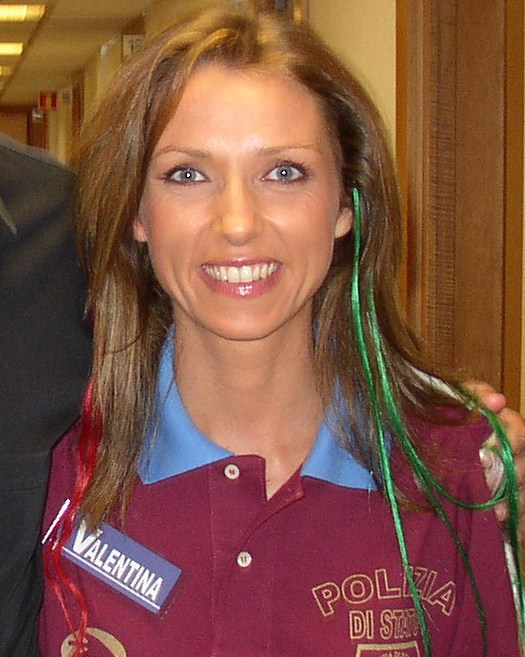
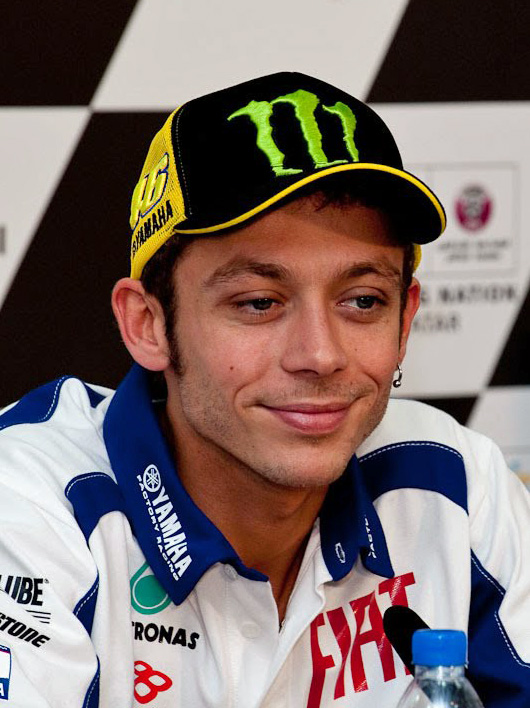
Respectively with 6 and 5 successes, Valentina Vezzali and Valentino Rossi are the most victorious athletes.
Women athletes

Athlete	Sport	Wins
Valentina Vezzali	Fencing	6
Valentino Rossi	Motorcycle racing	5
Federica Pellegrini	Swimming	4
Sara Simeoni	Athletics	4
Alberto Tomba	Alpine skiing	4
Stefania Belmondo	Cross-country skiing	3
Jury Chechi	Gymnastics	3
Deborah Compagnoni	Alpine skiing	3
Filippo Magnini	Swimming	3
Vincenzo Nibali	Cycling	3
Gregorio Paltrinieri	Swimming	2
Gianni Bugno	Cycling	2
Tania Cagnotto	Diving	2
Maria Canins	Cycling	2
Alberto Cova	Athletics	2
Sofia Goggia	Alpine skiing	2
Marcell Jacobs	Athletics	2
Pietro Mennea	Athletics	2
Giovanna Trillini	Fencing	2
Dorina Vaccaroni	Fencing	2

== See also ==
- La Gazzetta dello Sport
