= Göpfert =

Göpfert or Goepfert is a German surname. Notable people with the surname include:

- Bobby Goepfert (born 1983), American ice hockey player.
- Carl Andreas Göpfert (1768–1818), German classical clarinettist and composer.
- Dieter Göpfert (born 1957), German rower.
- Jason Goepfert (born 1971), American writer.
- Klaus-Peter Göpfert (born 1948), German sport wrestler.

== See also ==
- Goepfert Bluff, a bluff of Marie Byrd Land, Antarctica.
- Goepfert case, a Hong Kong tax case.
