= Zasada (surname) =

Zasada is a surname. Notable people with the surname include:

- Artur Zasada (born 1969), Polish politician
- Mariusz Zasada (footballer) (born 1982), Polish footballer
- Mariusz Zasada (gymnast) (born 1951), Polish gymnast
- Sobiesław Zasada (born 1930), Polish rally driver
- Tony Zasada (1960–1984), Canadian rower
