= William Lang =

William Lang may refer to:

- William Lang (American football), coach of the Maryland Terrapins football team, 1908–1909
- William Henry Lang (1874–1960), British botanist
- William Henry Lang (soldier), British Army officer
- William Dickson Lang (1878–1966), keeper of the department of geology at the British Museum, 1928–1938
- William Lang (British athlete) (c. 1838–?), professional British runner
- William Lang (architect) (1846–1897), American architect

== See also ==
- Bill Lang (William Langfranchi, 1883–1952), Australian professional boxer
- Bill Lang (rower) (born 1956), British Olympic rower
- Bill Lange (disambiguation)
