= Viacava =

Viacava is an Italian surname from Genoa. Notable people with the surname include:

- Adam Sayf Viacava (born 1999), known simply as Sayf, Italian rapper and singer-songwriter
- Francisco Viacava (born 1961), Peruvian rower
- Juan Viacava (born 1999), Uruguayan footballer
