= Cuelenaere =

Surname list

Cuelenaere is a surname. Notable people with the surname include:

- John Marcel Cuelenaere (1910–1967), Canadian lawyer and politician
- Philippe Cuelenaere (born 1971), Belgian Olympic rower
