= Bill Lange (disambiguation) =

Bill Lange may refer to:

- Bill Lange (1871–1950), American baseball player
- Bill Lange (coach) (1897–1953), American basketball and football player and coach
- Bill Lange (offensive guard) (1928–1995), American football player

== See also ==
- Bill Lang (1882–1952), Australian boxer
- Bill Lang (rower) (born 1956), British Olympic rower
- William Lang (disambiguation)
