= Mariusz Zasada =

Mariusz Zasada can refer to:

- Mariusz Zasada (footballer)
- Mariusz Zasada (gymnast)
- Mariusz Zasada (sports scientist)
