= Giuseppe Abbagnale =

Italian rower (born 1959)

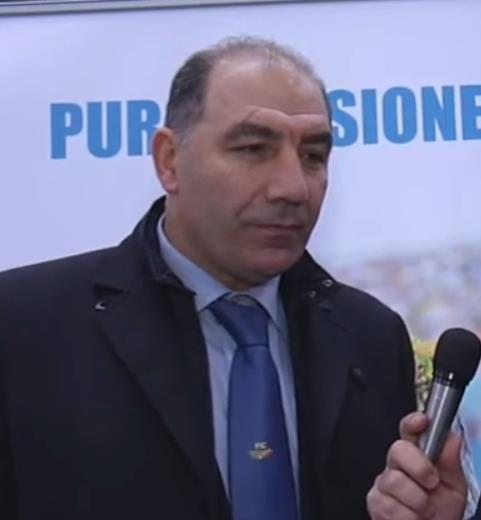
- Giuseppe Abbagnale in 2013.

Personal information
- Born: 24 July 1959 (age 66) Pompei, Naples, Italy
Medal record
Men's rowing
Representing Italy
Olympic Games
| Gold medal – first place | 1984 Los Angeles | Coxed pair |
| Gold medal – first place | 1988 Seoul | Coxed pair |
| Silver medal – second place | 1992 Barcelona | Coxed pair |
World Rowing Championships
| Gold medal – first place | 1981 Munich | Coxed pair |
| Gold medal – first place | 1982 Lucerne | Coxed pair |
| Gold medal – first place | 1985 Hazewinkel | Coxed pair |
| Gold medal – first place | 1987 Copenhagen | Coxed pair |
| Gold medal – first place | 1989 Bled | Coxed pair |
| Gold medal – first place | 1990 Lake Barrington | Coxed pair |
| Gold medal – first place | 1991 Vienna | Coxed pair |
| Silver medal – second place | 1986 Nottingham | Coxed pair |
| Silver medal – second place | 1993 Račice | Coxed pair |
| Bronze medal – third place | 1983 Duisburg | Coxed pair |
Mediterranean Games
| Gold medal – first place | 1991 Athens | Coxed pair |
| Silver medal – second place | 1979 Split | Coxed pair |
| Silver medal – second place | 1993 Languedoc-Roussillon | Coxed pair |

Giuseppe Abbagnale (born 24 July 1959) is an Italian former rower. He is the current president of the Italian Rowing Federation prior of which he won multiple coxed pair world and Olympic championships with his brother Carmine Abbagnale.

The Abbagnale brothers are the older brothers of the three-time Olympic champion Agostino.

== Biography ==
He received a gold medal in coxed pair with Giuseppe Di Capua (cox) and his younger brother Carmine, at the 1984 Summer Olympics in Los Angeles, and again at the 1988 Summer Olympics in Seoul. The crew won silver medals at the 1992 Summer Olympics in Barcelona behind another pair of brothers, Greg and Jonny Searle.

== See also ==
- Italy national rowing team

Summer Olympics
| Preceded by Pietro Mennea | Flag bearer for Italy; 1992 Barcelona | Succeeded by Giovanna Trillini |
