= Mario Streit =

East German rower (born 1967)

Medal record

Men's rowing

Representing East Germany

Olympic Games
Silver medal – second place	1988 Seoul	Coxed pair

Mario Streit (born 14 April 1967 in Rathenow) is a German rower.
