= Guy Defraigne =

Belgian rower

Personal information
- Nationality: Belgian
- Born: 24 January 1958 (age 67); Ghent, Belgium
- Relatives: William Defraigne (brother)

Sport
- Sport: Rowing
- Club: Royal Club Nautique de Gand

Guy Defraigne (born 24 January 1958) is a Belgian rower. He competed at the 1972 Summer Olympics and the 1984 Summer Olympics.
