= Flávio de Melo =

Brazilian rower (1965–1992)

Personal information
- Nationality: Brazilian
- Born: 21 June 1965
- Died: 26 June 1992 (aged 27)

Sport
- Sport: Rowing

Flávio de Melo (21 June 1965 – 26 June 1992) was a Brazilian rower. He competed in the men's coxed pair event at the 1988 Summer Olympics.
