= Ireneusz Omięcki =

Polish rower

Personal information
- Nationality: Polish
- Born: 10 September 1958 (age 66); Szczecin, Poland

Sport
- Sport: Rowing

Ireneusz Omięcki (born 10 September 1958) is a Polish rowing coxswain. He competed in the men's coxed pair event at the 1988 Summer Olympics.
