= Dario Vidošević =

Croatian rower (1968–2020)

Personal information
- Nationality: Croatian
- Born: 13 April 1968; Split, Yugoslavia
- Died: 27 May 2020 (aged 52)

Sport
- Sport: Rowing

Dario Vidošević (13 April 1968 – 27 May 2020) was a Croatian rowing coxswain. He competed in the men's coxed pair event at the 1984 Summer Olympics.
