= Emil Groytsev =

Bulgarian rower

Personal information
- Nationality: Bulgarian
- Born: 16 October 1964 (age 60); Rudozem, Bulgaria

Sport
- Sport: Rowing

Emil Groytsev (Bulgarian: Емил Гройцев, born 16 October 1964) is a Bulgarian rower. He competed in the men's coxed pair event at the 1988 Summer Olympics.
