= Joaquín Sabriá =

Spanish rower

Personal information
- Full name: Joaquín Sabriá Pitarch
- Nationality: Spanish
- Born: 22 August 1961 (age 63); Barcelona, Spain
- Relatives: Javier Sabriá (brother)

Sport
- Sport: Rowing

Joaquín Sabriá Pitarch (born 22 August 1961) is a Spanish rowing coxswain. He competed in the men's coxed pair event at the 1984 Summer Olympics.
