= Atanas Andreev =

Bulgarian rower

Personal information
- Nationality: Bulgarian
- Born: 15 January 1960 (age 65) Sofia, Bulgaria

Sport
- Sport: Rowing

Atanas Andreev (Bulgarian: Атанас Андреев, born 15 January 1960) is a Bulgarian rower. He competed in the men's coxed pair event at the 1988 Summer Olympics.
