= René Rensch =

East German rowing cox

Medal record

Men's rowing

Representing East Germany

Olympic Games
Silver medal – second place	1988 Seoul	Coxed pair

René Rensch (born 18 March 1969 in Kyritz) is a German rowing cox.
