= Roman Kazantsev =

Soviet rower

Personal information
- Nationality: Soviet
- Born: 9 February 1965 (age 60)

Sport
- Sport: Rowing

Roman Kazantsev (born 9 February 1965) is a Soviet rower. He competed in the men's coxed pair event at the 1988 Summer Olympics.
