= Andrey Lipsky =

Russian coxswain

Personal information
- Nationality: Soviet
- Born: 26 February 1965
- Died: 2015 (aged 49–50)

Sport
- Sport: Rowing

Andrey Lipsky (26 February 1965 – 2015) was a Soviet rowing coxswain. He competed in the men's coxed pair event at the 1988 Summer Olympics.
