= Nathaniel Reilly-O'Donnell =

British rower

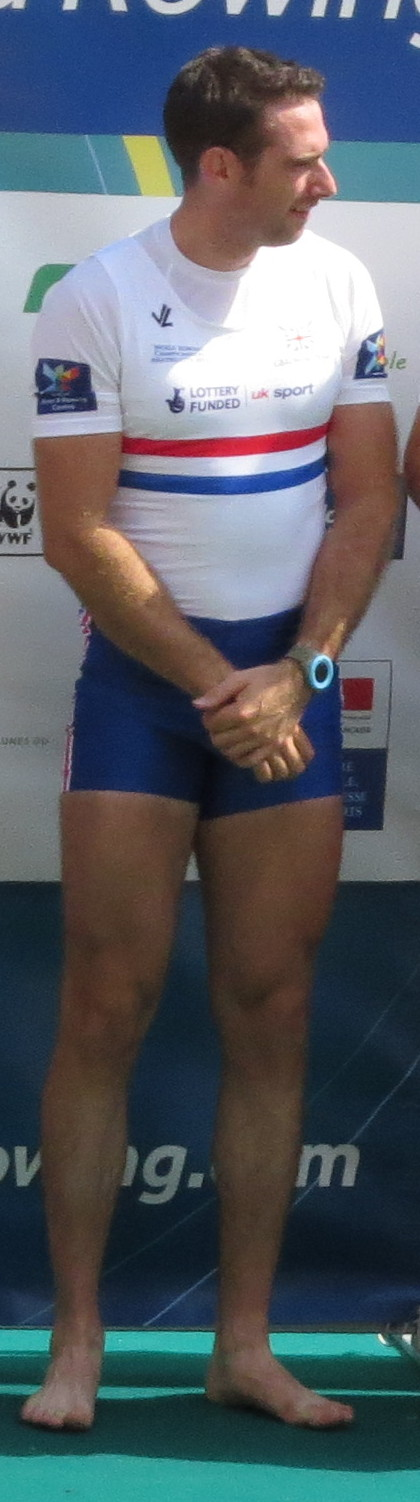

Personal information
- Nickname: Noddy
- Nationality: British
- Born: 13 April 1988 (age 38) Ealing, England
- Education: University College London
- Children: 3
Medal record
Men's rowing
Representing Great Britain
World Championships
Gold medal – first place	2014 Amsterdam	Eight
Gold medal – first place	2015 Lac d'Aiguebelette	Coxed pair
Silver medal – second place	2011 Bled	Eight
European Championships
Gold medal – first place	2015 Poznań	Coxless four

Nathaniel “Noddy” Reilly-O'Donnell (born 13 April 1988) is a British rower educated at St Leonard's School, Durham and University College London.

== Biography ==
=== Junior ===
Started rowing age 12 at St Leonard's School, Durham. At the 2005 World Junior Championships, he finished 7th overall in the coxed four. At U16 level, he competed in the pair in the J16 GB v France Match. Both he and the GB team won the match. In 2006, he became World Junior Champion in the men's four.

As a Great Britain squad captain at the 2007 Youth Olympic Festival in Australia, Noddy won three medals: two golds in the coxless four and the pair, and a silver in the eight. In the 2009 World Championships in Račice he won a bronze medal at the World U23 Championships in the men's eight.

=== Senior ===
At the 2011 World Rowing Championships in Bled, Nathaniel and crew mates Alex Partridge, James Foad, Cameron Nichol, Moe Sbihi, Greg Searle, Tom Ransley, Daniel Ritchie and Phelan Hill won a silver medal in the men's eight.

During the 2011 World Cup Series he raced in the men's eight, taking a silver medal behind Germany in Munich and a bronze in Lucerne. He competed at the 2014 World Rowing Championships in Bosbaan, Amsterdam, where he won a gold medal as part of the eight.

In the 2015 season he won gold in the men's four at the 2015 European Rowing Championships in Poznań, along with crewmates Alan Sinclair, Tom Ransley and Scott Durant. The same crew finished fifth at the World Cup in Varese. He was part of the British team that topped the medal table at the 2015 World Rowing Championships at Lac d'Aiguebelette in France, where he won a gold medal as part of the coxed pair with Matthew Tarrant and Henry Fieldman.

== Achievements ==
=== Junior World Championships ===
- 2005 – 7th, Coxed Four
- 2006 Bosbaan – Gold, Coxless Four

=== World U23 Championships ===
- 2007 6th, Men's Eight
- 2008 5th, Men's Eight
- 2009 Račice – Bronze, Men's Eight
- 2010 Brest – Silver, Men's Eight

=== World Championships ===
- 2011 Bled – Silver, Men's Eight
- 2013 Chungju – 5th, Coxless Four
- 2014 Amsterdam – Gold, Men's Eight
- 2015 Aiguebelette – Gold, Men's Coxed Pair

=== European Rowing Championships ===
- 2008 6th, Men's Eight
- 2014 4th, Coxless Pair
- 2015 Poznań – Gold, Coxless Four

=== World Cups ===
- 2011 Lucerne – Bronze, Eight
- 2011 Munich – Silver, Eight
- 2012 Belgrade – Silver, Eight
