= Hermann Greß =

German rower

Personal information
- Nationality: German
- Born: 16 December 1954 (age 70); Würzburg, Germany

Sport
- Sport: Rowing

Hermann Greß (born 16 December 1954) is a German rower. He competed in the men's coxed pair event at the 1984 Summer Olympics.
