= William Defraigne =

Belgian rower

Personal information
- Nationality: Belgian
- Born: 4 December 1950 (age 74); Ghent, Belgium
- Relatives: Guy Defraigne (brother)

Sport
- Sport: Rowing
- Club: Royal Club Nautique de Gand

William Defraigne (born 4 December 1950) is a Belgian rower. He competed in the men's coxed pair event at the 1984 Summer Olympics.
