= Christophe Chevrier =

French rowing coxswain

Personal information
- Nationality: French
- Born: 28 August 1963 (age 63)

Sport
- Sport: Rowing

Christophe Chevrier (born 28 August 1963) is a French rowing coxswain. He competed in the men's coxed pair event at the 1984 Summer Olympics.
