= James Foad =

English rower

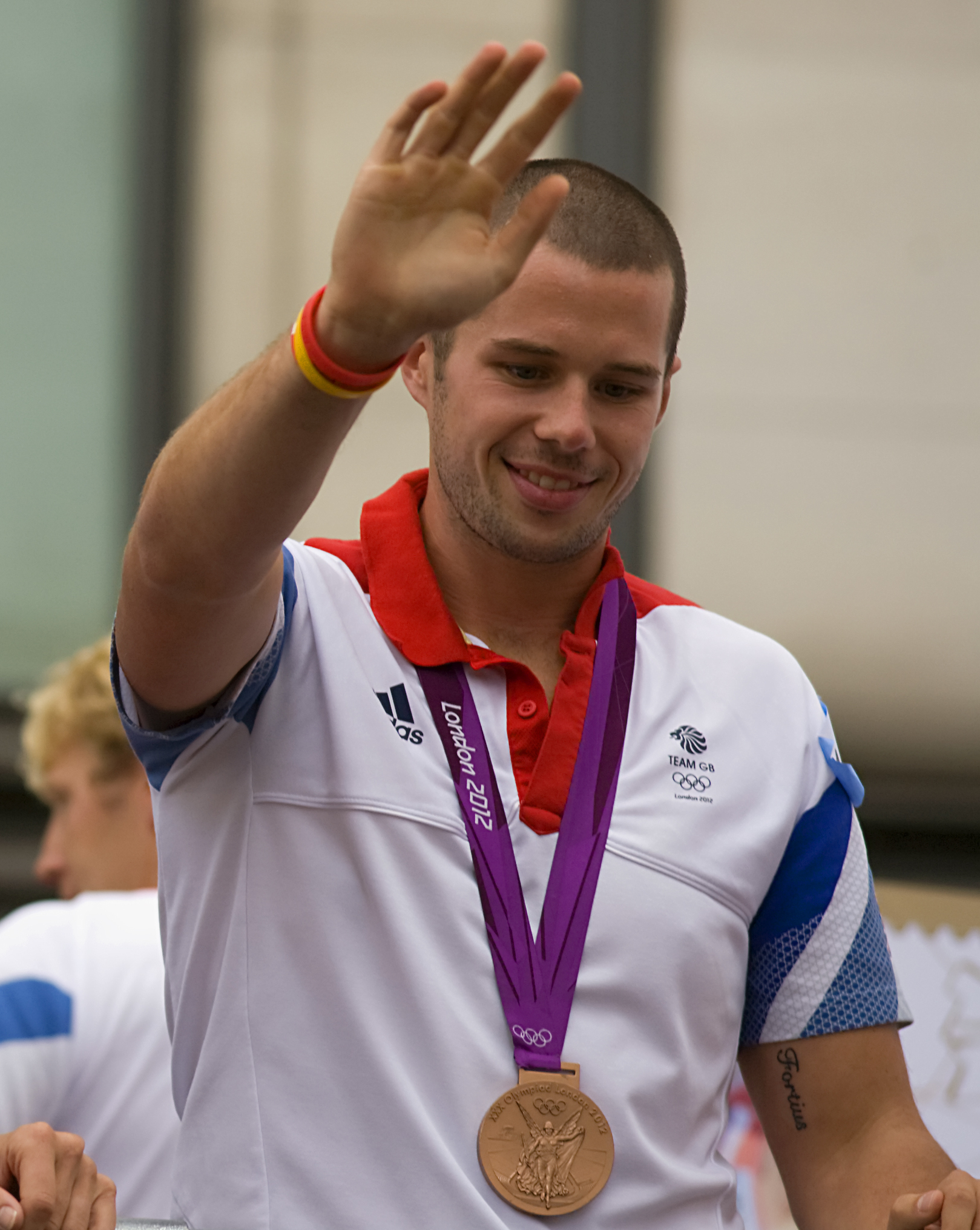

Personal information
- Born: 20 March 1987 (age 39) Southampton, England
Medal record
Men's rowing
Representing Great Britain
Olympic Games
Bronze medal – third place	2012 London	Eight
World Championships
Silver medal – second place	2010 Karapiro	Eight
Silver medal – second place	2011 Bled	Eight
Silver medal – second place	2014 Amsterdam	Coxless pair
Silver medal – second place	2015 Aiguebelette	Coxless pair
European Championships
Gold medal – first place	2015 Poznan	Coxless pair
Bronze medal – third place	2014 Belgrade	Eight

James Foad (born 20 March 1987) is an English rower. At the 2012 Summer Olympics in London he was part of the British crew that won the bronze medal in the men's eight. He was the 2015 European Champion in the men's pair, along with Matt Langridge.

== Biography ==
James started rowing at the age of 11 at Itchen Rowing Club, following in his father's footsteps. By the time he was 17 he had won the Junior Sculls Championships for the Hants and Dorset region and was the youngest person to win this. The following year he trialled for the GB Junior Team and was selected to row in the M4+ at the World Junior Championships in Brandenburg. He raced with the senior men's squad in 2009, winning a bronze medal in the eight at the first World Cup in Banyoles, and was placed 8th in the second British men's four in Munich. He also raced in the men's pair at the 2009 World U23 Championships, where he finished 8th.

At the 2010 World Rowing Championships on New Zealand's Lake Karapiro, James won a silver medal in the eight. They were only six-tenths of a second behind the reigning world champions, Germany, as they crossed the line. The bronze medal went to Australia. For the 2010 World Cup Series James raced in the men's eight, winning a gold medal in Bled, a bronze in Munich and taking another bronze in Lucerne.

At the 2011 World Rowing Championships in Bled, James and crew mates Alex Partridge, Cameron Nichol, Nathaniel Reilly-O'Donnell, Moe Sbihi, Greg Searle, Tom Ransley, Daniel Ritchie and (cox) Phelan Hill won a silver medal in the men's eight after rowing through opposition from Canada and Australia. Germany won the gold. James won bronze in the men's eight at the 2011 World Cup Regatta in Lucerne. At the 2011 GB Rowing Team Senior Trials held on 16–17 April at Eton/Dorney, James took 5th place in the men's pair with Moe Sbihi.

At the 2012 Olympic Games in London James won a bronze medal in the men's eight. During the 2012 World Cup Series, James raced in the men's eight. In Belgrade, the crew won a silver medal finishing 3 seconds behind the German eight. The crew now stroked by James won silver once again in Lucerne but closed the gap to just over 1 second. The crew won a bronze medal in Munich, the final race before the Olympics in London. At the 2012 GB Rowing Team Senior Trials held on 10/11 March at Eton/Dorney, James and crew mate Moe Sbihi came fifth in the men's pair.

He competed at the 2014 World Rowing Championships in Bosbaan, Amsterdam, where he won a silver medal as part of the coxless pair with Matt Langridge and was part of the British team that topped the medal table at the 2015 World Rowing Championships at Lac d'Aiguebelette in France, where he won a silver medal as part of the coxless pair with Matt Langridge.

== Achievements ==
=== World Championships ===
- 2010 2010 Karapiro – Silver, Men's Eight
- 2011 2011 Bled – Silver, Men's Eight
- 2014 2014 Amsterdam - Silver, Men's Pair
- 2015 2014 Amsterdam - Silver, Men's Pair

=== European Championships ===
- 2015 Poznan - Gold, Men's Pair

=== World Cups ===
- 2009 Banyoles – Bronze, Eight
- 2010 Bled – Gold, Eight
- 2010 Munich – Bronze, Eight
- 2010 Lucerne – Bronze, Eight
- 2011 Lucerne – Bronze, Eight
- 2012 Belgrade – Silver, Eight
- 2012 Lucerne – Silver, Eight
- 2012 Munich – Bronze, Eight

=== U23 World Championships ===
- 2009 Račice – 8th, Coxless Pair

=== Junior World Championships ===
- 2005 Brandenburg – 7th, Coxed Four
