= Andrey Korikov =

Soviet rower

Personal information
- Nationality: Soviet
- Born: 2 January 1964 (age 61)

Sport
- Sport: Rowing

Andrey Korikov (born 2 January 1964) is a Soviet rower. He competed in the men's coxed pair event at the 1988 Summer Olympics.
