= Alex Partridge =

British rower (born 1981)

Personal information
- Full name: Alexander Matthew Partridge
- Nationality: British
- Born: 25 January 1981 (age 45) San Francisco, California, U.S.
- Height: 6 ft 4 in (193 cm)
- Weight: 14.5 st (203 lb; 92 kg)

Sport
- Country: Great Britain
- Sport: Men's rowing
- Event(s): Coxless Four, Eight
- College team: Oxford Brookes University Boat Club
- Club: Leander Club
- Coached by: Jürgen Gröbler
Medal record
Representing Great Britain
Olympic Games
Silver medal – second place	2008 Beijing	Eight
Bronze medal – third place	2012 London	Eight
World Championships
Gold medal – first place	2005 Gifu	Coxless Four
Gold medal – first place	2006 Eton	Coxless Four
Gold medal – first place	2009 Poznań	Coxless Four
Silver medal – second place	2011 Bled	Eight
Bronze medal – third place	2001 Lucerne	Coxed Four
Bronze medal – third place	2003 Milan	Eight

Alexander Matthew Partridge (born 25 January 1981 in San Francisco) is a British rower, and an Olympic silver and bronze medallist.

== Education ==
Partridge started rowing at Monkton Combe School, Bath, and attended Oxford Brookes University to study Technology Management. Double Olympic champion Steve Williams, with whom Partridge won two world titles attended both the same school, and the same university, as did Rowley Douglas – cox of the British Rowing 8 at the 2000 Olympics in Sydney.

== International rowing career ==
Partridge first made his mark at senior level in 2001. Having won a silver medal in the four at the World U23 Championships with Christopher Martin, Henry Adams and Dan Ouseley, the crew met the standard to gain selection for the coxed four at the senior World Championships in Lucerne. Having reached the final, they proved to be particularly strong in the final 500 m, rowing through the field to snatch the bronze medal on the line.

In 2002 and 2003, Alex raced in the Eight; the crew finished 6th at the World Championships, but stepped up in 2003 to win a bronze medal.

In 2004, Partridge won the GB Rowing Senior Selection Trials in the pair with Andrew Triggs Hodge. This proved a headache for the selectors who had already shuffled the previous year's crews considerably, in the wake of Matthew Pinsent and James Cracknell's disappointing 4th place in the pair in Milan. Until the trials Pinsent and Cracknell had been training in a four with Steve Williams and Josh West, but following the unexpected trials result replaced West with Partridge. Hodge remained in the Eight. However, following the World Cup in Lucerne, Partridge was diagnosed with a collapsed lung and had to withdraw from the Athens Olympics; he was replaced in the coxless four by Ed Coode, and the crew went on to win the Olympic final beating the Canadian 4- by just 0.08 seconds. Patridge, however, was first across the line; the crew had named their boat after him.

In 2005 Partridge returned to full fitness and regained his place in the men's four with Triggs Hodge, Pete Reed and Williams, winning gold in the World Cups at Eton, Munich and Lucerne and capping the season by taking gold in the World Championships in Japan. The 2006 World Cup brought further success with gold in all of the World Cup events in Munich, Poznań and Lucerne and another World Championship victory in front of their home supporters at Dorney Lake, Eton.

The 2007 season proved to be far more disappointing; the previously unbeaten four was hit by injury, and although the full line up raced at the World Championships, they finished 4th – in startling contrast to their dominance of the previous two years.

In 2008, Partridge was replaced in the coxless four by quadruple Cambridge Blue Tom James. Instead Partridge spent the season in the Eight, winning a silver medal in the Olympic final in Beijing.

He returned to the men's Four in 2009 and won gold at the World Championships in Poznań on 29 August 2009 alongside Matt Langridge, Alex Gregory and Ric Egington. He was part of the British squad that topped the medal table at the 2011 World Rowing Championships in Bled, where he won a silver medal as part of the eight with Nathaniel Reilly-O'Donnell, Cameron Nichol, James Foad, Moe Sbihi, Greg Searle, Tom Ransley, Daniel Ritchie and Phelan Hill.

At the 2012 London Summer Olympics, Partridge won bronze in the men's eight event. The race was very close, with Great Britain taking the lead at the 1000 m mark, but lost the lead to Germany and then ended up finishing in the bronze medal position due to a late charge by Canada.

Partridge's bronze Olympic medal was stolen while in London at a night club in October 2012.

== Achievements ==
=== Olympics ===
- 2008 Beijing – Silver, Eight (bow)
- 2012 London – Bronze, Eight (bow)

=== World Championships ===
- 2011 Bled – Silver Eight (four)
- 2010 Karapiro – 4th Coxless Four
- 2009 Poznań – Gold, Coxless Four
- 2007 Munich – 4th, Coxless Four (three)
- 2006 Eton – Gold, Coxless Four (three)
- 2005 Gifu – Gold, Coxless Four (three)
- 2003 Milan – Bronze, Eight (bow)
- 2002 Seville – 6th, Eight (bow)
- 2001 Lucerne – Bronze, Coxed Four (three)

=== World Cups ===
- 2012 Munich – Bronze Eight (bow)
- 2012 Lucerne – Silver Eight (bow)
- 2012 Belgrade – Silver Eight (bow)
- 2011 Lucerne – Silver Eight (bow)
- 2011 Munich – Silver Eight (bow)
- 2010 Lucerne – Gold Four (bow)
- 2010 Munich – Silver Four (bow)
- 2009 Lucerne – Gold Four (bow)
- 2009 Bled – Bronze Four (bow)
- 2009 Bled – Gold Four (bow)
- 2008 Poznań – Gold, Eight (bow)
- 2008 Lucerne – Bronze, Eight (bow)
- 2008 Munich – Silver, Eight (bow)
- 2007 Amsterdam – Gold, Eight (bow)
- 2007 Linz – Gold, Coxless Four (three)
- 2006 Lucerne – Gold, Coxless Four (three)
- 2006 Poznań – Gold, Coxless Four (three)
- 2006 Munich – Gold, Coxless Four (three)
- 2005 Lucerne – Gold, Coxless Four (three)
- 2005 Munich – Gold, Coxless Four (three)
- 2005 Eton – Gold, Coxless Four (three)
- 2004 Lucerne – Bronze, Coxless Four (three)
- 2004 Munich – 5th, Coxless Four (three)
- 2004 Poznań – Gold, Coxless Four (three)
- 2003 Munich – 3rd, Eight (bow)
- 2002 Munich – 6th, Eight (three)
- 2002 Lucerne – 5th, Eight (three)
- 2002 Hazewinkel – Gold, Eight (three)
- 2001 Seville – 7th, Coxless Four (three)

=== World Under 23 Championships ===
- 2001 Linz – Silver, Coxless Four

=== World Junior Championships ===
- 1999 Plovdiv Lake – Silver, Coxless Four
- 1998 Linz – Bronze, Coxed Pair
