= Rudolf Ziegler =

German rowing coxswain

Personal information
- Nationality: German
- Born: 27 November 1957 (age 67); Sonthofen, Germany

Sport
- Sport: Rowing

Rudolf Ziegler (born 27 November 1957) is a German rowing coxswain. He competed in the men's coxed pair event at the 1984 Summer Olympics.
