= Frank Moore (rower) =

Irish rower

Personal information
- Nationality: Irish
- Born: 24 May 1952 (age 72); Mountmellick, Ireland

Sport
- Sport: Rowing

Frank Moore (born 24 May 1952) is an Irish rower. He competed in the men's coxed pair event at the 1988 Summer Olympics.
