= Arturo Valentín =

Peruvian rower

Personal information
- Nationality: Peruvian
- Born: 3 June 1968 (age 57)

Sport
- Sport: Rowing

Arturo Valentín (born 3 June 1968) is a Peruvian rower. He competed in the men's coxed pair event at the 1984 Summer Olympics.
