= Roman Ambrožič =

Slovenian coxswain (born 1973)

Personal information
- Nationality: Slovenian
- Born: 14 September 1973 (age 51); Bled, Yugoslavia

Sport
- Sport: Rowing

Roman Ambrožič (born 14 September 1973) is a Slovenian rowing coxswain. He competed in the men's coxed pair event at the 1988 Summer Olympics.
