= Ian McKerlich =

Canadian rower

Personal information
- Nationality: Canadian
- Born: 3 January 1965 (age 60); Vancouver, British Columbia, Canada

Sport
- Sport: Rowing

Ian McKerlich (born 3 January 1965) is a Canadian rower. He competed in the men's coxed pair event at the 1988 Summer Olympics. He graduated from University of British Columbia and Harvard Business School.
