= Javier Sabriá =

Spanish rower

Personal information
- Full name: Javier Sabriá Pitarch
- Nationality: Spanish
- Born: 14 July 1964 (age 60); Barcelona, Spain
- Relatives: Joaquín Sabriá (brother)

Sport
- Sport: Rowing

Javier Sabriá Pitarch (born 14 July 1964) is a Spanish rowing coxswain. He competed in the men's coxed four event at the 1980 Summer Olympics.
