= Kevin Still =

American rower (born 1960)

Personal information
- Full name: Kevin Raymond Still
- Nationality: United States
- Born: August 19, 1960 (age 65) Eureka, California
- Education: UCLA
- Height: 6 ft 5 in (196 cm)
- Weight: 207 lb (94 kg)

Sport
- Sport: Rowing
Medal record
Men's rowing
Representing the United States
Olympic Games
Bronze medal – third place	1984 Los Angeles	Coxed pair
World Championships
Bronze medal – third place	1985 Hazewinkel	Men's eight
Bronze medal – third place	1986 Nottingham	Men's eight
Goodwill Games
Gold medal – first place	1986 Moscow	Men's eight

Kevin Raymond Still (born August 19, 1960) is a former American competitive rower and Olympic bronze medalist. He is also a two-time bronze medalist at the World Rowing Championships.

== Career ==
At the 1984 Summer Olympics in Los Angeles, Still finished 3rd in the men's coxed pairs competition with Robert Espeseth and Doug Herland, finishing behind team Italy and Romania in a time of 7:12.81. Four years later, at the 1988 Summer Olympics in Seoul, Still and his partner, Glenn Florio, competed but did not make it past the heats in the men's double sculls event.

After transferring from Humboldt State University to UCLA in the fall of 1980, Still began rowing during his junior year. Still and his UCLA teammates finished 5th at the 1983 Intercollegiate Rowing Association regatta in the men's eight+. He graduated from UCLA in 1983.

In the summer of 1983, Still was selected to his first US National Rowing Team. At the 1983 World Rowing Championships in Duisburg, Still competed in the coxless four event with Robert Espeseth, Michael Bach, and Kevin Proctor and finished 6th.

In 1984, his fourth competitive season, Still was selected for the first of 2 Olympic teams that he would participate in as mentioned previously.

At the 1985 World Rowing Championships in Hazewinkel, Still sat in seat 6 of the American men's eight+ and finished in 3rd place, 1 second from 1st place.

At the 1986 World Rowing Championships in Nottingham, Still, sitting in seat 7, was a part of the American men's eight+ team that finished in 3rd place. Following the World Championships, Still competed at the 1986 Goodwill Games in Moscow, and won a gold medal as a part of the men's eight+ team.

In 1987, Still sat in seat 3 of the American coxed four team at the World Rowing Championships in Copenhagen, but the team had difficulty with the boat's rudder in the semifinals and they did not qualify for the final.

Still participated in the Olympic Job Opportunities program in 1987, and landed a training position at Johnson & Higgins (now Marsh & McLennan Companies). Still continues to work at Marsh USA as an SVP in its Japan Client Services unit in NYC.

During his post collegiate rowing career, Still rowed for the New York Athletic Club where he won multiple US National Championship medals. In 1988, the NYAC selected Still for the Veteran's Award as their "Athlete of the Year".
