= Mirko Ivančić =

Croatian rower

Personal information
- Nationality: Croatian
- Born: 5 June 1960 (age 66) Split, Yugoslavia

Sport
- Sport: Rowing

Mirko Ivančić (born 5 June 1960) is a Croatian rower. He competed in the men's coxed pair event at the 1984 Summer Olympics.
