= Cameron Nichol =

British rower

Personal information
- Born: 26 June 1987 (age 38) Roehampton, England
Medal record
Men's rowing
Representing Great Britain
World Championships
Silver medal – second place	2010 Karapiro	Eight
Silver medal – second place	2011 Bled	Eight

Cameron Nichol (born 26 June 1987) is a British rower.

== Life ==
He is educated at Milfield School and University College London, University of London.

== Rowing career ==
Nichol was part of the British squad that topped the medal table at the 2011 World Rowing Championships in Bled, where he won a silver medal as part of the eight with Nathaniel Reilly-O'Donnell, James Foad, Alex Partridge, Moe Sbihi, Greg Searle, Tom Ransley, Daniel Ritchie and Phelan Hill.

== Rowing achievements ==
=== Olympic Games ===
- 2012 2012 London – Team GB, Men's Spare Pair

=== World Championships ===
- 2010 2010 Karapiro – Silver, Men's Eight
- 2011 2011 Bled – Silver, Men's Eight

=== World Cups ===
- 2012 Lucerne – 7th, Men's Pair
- 2012 Munich – 9th, Men's Pair
- 2011 Munich – Silver, Eight
- 2011 Lucerne – Bronze, Eight
- 2010 Munich – 5th, Men's Pair
- 2010 Lucerne – 9th, Men's Pair
- 2010 Bled – 8th, Men's Pair
- 2008 Lucerne – 13th, Men's Four
- 2007 Amsterdam – 13th, Men's Four

=== World U23 Championships ===
- 2007 Glasgow – Bronze, Coxless Four
- 2008 Beetzsee – 6th

=== European Rowing Championships ===
- 2007 Poznań – 5th, Men's Eight

=== Henley Royal Regatta ===
- 2011 Henley Royal Regatta – Finalist, Grand Challenge Cup
- 2010 Henley Royal Regatta – Semi-Finalist, Goblet's & Nickall's Challenge Cup
- 2008 Henley Royal Regatta – Semi-Finalist, Steward's Challenge Cup
- 2007 Henley Royal Regatta – Winner, Prince Albert Challenge Cup
- 2006 Henley Royal Regatta – Finalist, Men's Student Coxed Four

== Personal life ==
Following the 2012 London Olympics, Nichol returned to medical school and started an online rowing training program called RowingWOD.
