= Daniel Ritchie =

British rower (born 1987)

Daniel James Cameron Ritchie
Personal information
- Native name: Daniel Ritchie
- National team: Great Britain Rowing Team
- Born: 6 January 1987 (age 39) Margate, Kent, England
- Education: The Southport School, Australia; The University of Kent
- Height: 193 cm (6 ft 4 in)
- Weight: 91 kg (201 lb)

Sport
- Sport: Rowing (River & Coastal)
- Position: Stroke side
- Club: Leander Club & Herne Bay ARC

Achievements and titles
- World finals: 5
Medal record
Men's rowing
Representing Great Britain
World Championships
Gold medal – first place	2013 Chungju	M8+
Silver medal – second place	2010 Karapiro	M8+
Silver medal – second place	2011 Bled	M8+

Daniel Ritchie (born 6 January 1987 in Margate) is a British rower.

== Rowing career ==
Ritchie was introduced to rowing while attending The Southport School in Queensland, Australia.

He was part of the British squad that topped the medal table at the 2011 World Rowing Championships in Bled, where he won a silver medal as part of the eight with Nathaniel Reilly-O'Donnell, Cameron Nichol, James Foad, Alex Partridge, Moe Sbihi, Greg Searle, Tom Ransley and Phelan Hill. Two years later he competed at the 2013 World Rowing Championships in Chungju, where he won a gold medal as part of the eight with Tom Ransley, Alex Gregory, Pete Reed, Moe Sbihi, Andrew Triggs Hodge, George Nash, Will Satch and Phelan Hill.
