= Giuseppe Di Capua =

Italian rower

Personal information
- Born: 15 March 1958 (age 68) Salerno, Italy
- Height: 1.55 m (5 ft 1 in)
- Weight: 53 kg (117 lb)
Medal record
Men's rowing
Representing Italy
Olympic Games
| Gold medal – first place | 1984 Los Angeles | Coxed pair |
| Gold medal – first place | 1988 Seoul | Coxed pair |
| Silver medal – second place | 1992 Barcelona | Coxed pair |

Giuseppe "Peppiniello" Di Capua (born 15 March 1958) is an Italian competition rowing coxswain and Olympic champion.

== Biography ==
Di Capua was born in Salerno. He received a gold medal in coxed pairs as cox, with Giuseppe Abbagnale and Carmine Abbagnale, at the 1984 Summer Olympics in Los Angeles, and again at the 1988 Summer Olympics in Seoul. The crew won silver medals at the 1992 Summer Olympics in Barcelona behind another pair of brothers, Greg and Jonny Searle. In 2013 he won a silver medal at the World Rowing Championships in Chungju, Korea, coxing the Italian LTA mixed coxed four, and in 2014 a bronze in the same event at the World Championships in Amsterdam.
