= Carmine Abbagnale =

Italian rower (born 1962)

Personal information
- Nationality: Italian
- Born: 5 January 1962 (age 64) Pompei, Naples, Italy
Medal record
Men's rowing
Representing Italy
Olympic Games
Gold medal – first place	1984 Los Angeles	Coxed pair
Gold medal – first place	1988 Seoul	Coxed pair
Silver medal – second place	1992 Barcelona	Coxed pair
World Rowing Championships
Gold medal – first place	1981 Munich	Coxed pair
Gold medal – first place	1982 Lucerne	Coxed pair
Gold medal – first place	1985 Hazewinkel	Coxed pair
Gold medal – first place	1987 Copenhagen	Coxed pair
Gold medal – first place	1989 Bled	Coxed pair
Gold medal – first place	1990 Lake Barrington	Coxed pair
Gold medal – first place	1991 Vienna	Coxed pair
Silver medal – second place	1986 Nottingham	Coxed pair
Silver medal – second place	1993 Račice	Coxed pair
Silver medal – second place	1994 Indianapolis	Coxed pair
Bronze medal – third place	1983 Duisburg	Coxed pair
Mediterranean Games
Gold medal – first place	1991 Athens	Coxed pair
Silver medal – second place	1993 Languedoc-Roussillon	Coxed pair

Carmine Abbagnale (born 5 January 1962) is an Italian competition rower and Olympic champion.

The Abbagnale brothers are the older brothers of the three-time Olympic champion Agostino.

== Biography ==
Abbagnale received a gold medal in coxed pairs, with Giuseppe Di Capua (cox) and his older brother Giuseppe, at the 1984 Summer Olympics in Los Angeles, and again at the 1988 Summer Olympics in Seoul. The crew won silver medals at the 1992 Summer Olympics in Barcelona behind another pair of brothers, Greg and Jonny Searle.

== See also ==
- Italy national rowing team
