= Alfredo Montenegro =

Peruvian rower

Personal information
- Full name: Alfredo Montenegro Martino
- Nationality: Peruvian
- Born: 22 July 1955 (age 69)

Sport
- Sport: Rowing

Alfredo Montenegro Martino (Note: In this Spanish name, the first or paternal surname is Montenegro and the second or maternal family name is Martino.) (born 22 July 1955) is a Peruvian rower. He competed in the men's coxed pair event at the 1984 Summer Olympics.
