= Tony Zasada =

Canadian rower

Personal information
- Born: 11 December 1960; Hamilton, Ontario, Canada
- Died: 19 August 1984 (aged 23); Regina, Saskatchewan, Canada

Sport
- Sport: Rowing

Tony Zasada (11 December 1960 – 19 August 1984) was a Canadian rower. He competed in the men's coxed pair event at the 1984 Summer Olympics. He was killed in a road crash five days after the conclusion of the 1984 Olympics.
