= Dieter Göpfert =

German rower

Personal information
- Nationality: German
- Born: 5 October 1957 (age 67); Würzburg, Germany

Sport
- Sport: Rowing

Dieter Göpfert (born 5 October 1957) is a German rower. He competed in the men's coxed pair event at the 1984 Summer Olympics.
