= Pat Newman (rowing) =

Canadian coxswain (born 1963)

Personal information
- Born: Patrick Newman; August 7, 1963 (age 62) St. Catharines, Ontario, Canada
- Occupation: Rowing Coach/Service Technician
- Years active: 24
- Height: 176 cm (5 ft 9 in)
- Weight: 152 lb (69 kg)
- Spouse: Stephanie Newman - separated

Sport
- Sport: Rowing
Medal record
Men's rowing
Representing Canada
World Championships
Gold medal – first place	1993 Račice	Lwt eight

Patrick Newman (born August 7, 1963) is a Canadian coxswain. He won a gold medal at the 1993 World Rowing Championships in Račice with the lightweight men's eight. At the 1996 Summer Olympics in Atlanta, he came fourth with the Canadian men's eight.
