= Francisco Viacava =

Peruvian rower

Personal information
- Nationality: Peruvian
- Born: 22 March 1961 (age 64)

Sport
- Sport: Rowing

Francisco Viacava (born 22 March 1961) is a Peruvian rower. He competed in the men's coxed pair event at the 1984 Summer Olympics.
