= Jean-Pierre Bremer =

French rower

Personal information
- Nationality: French
- Born: 30 January 1957 (age 68)

Sport
- Sport: Rowing

Jean-Pierre Bremer (born 30 January 1957) is a French rower. He competed at the 1980 Summer Olympics and the 1984 Summer Olympics.
