= Coxed pair =

Boat class used in competitive rowing

Coxed pair icon

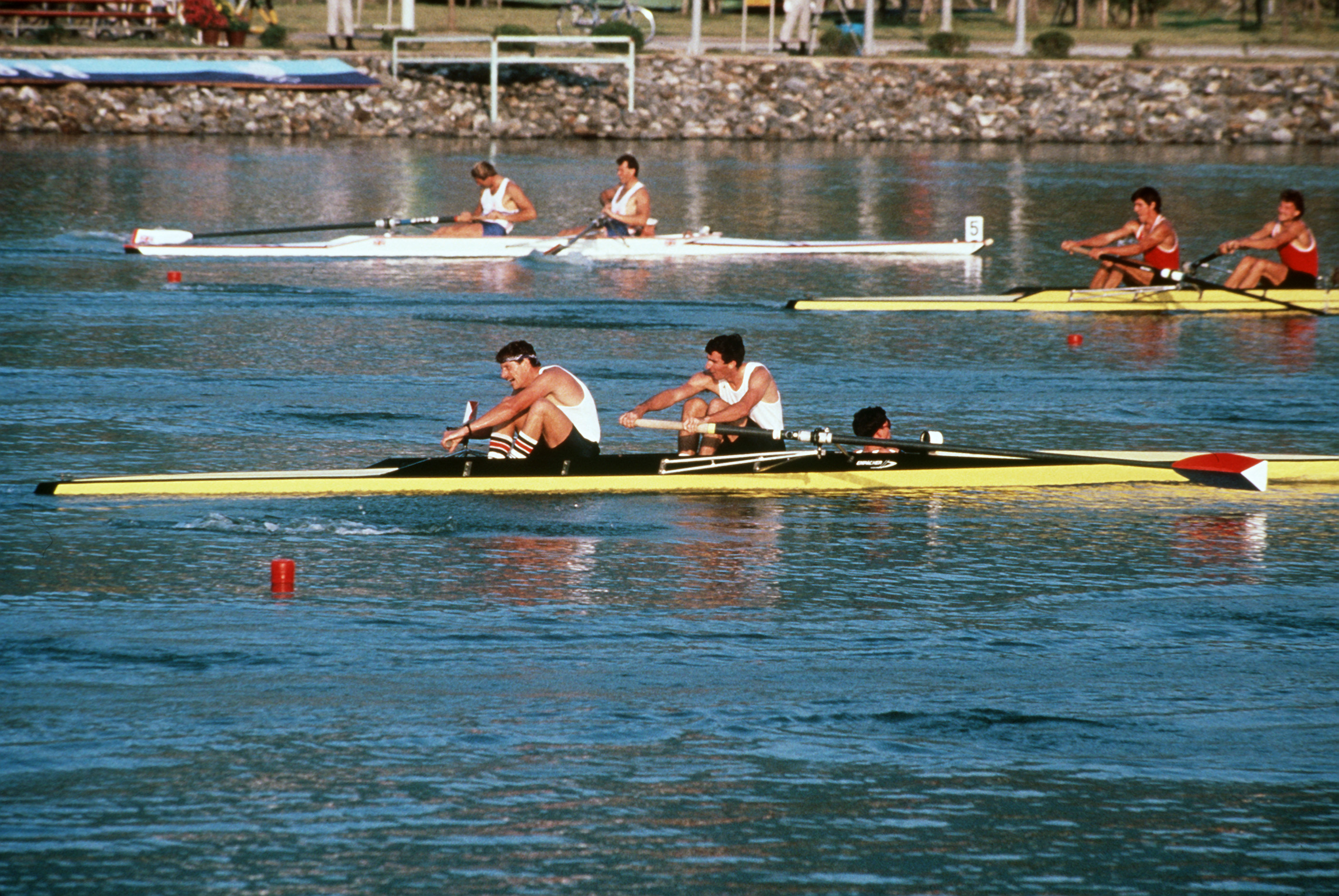
Daniel Lyons, Robert Espeseth and Jonathan Fish of the US Olympic team competing in the 1988 Olympic Games

A coxed pair, abbreviated as a 2+, is a racing shell used in the sport of competitive rowing. It is designed for two persons who propel the boat with sweep oars and is steered by a coxswain (cox). The coxed pair has not been part of the Olympic program since the 1992 Olympics or the World Championships program since 2017.

The crew consists of two rowers, each having one oar, and a cox. One rower is on the port side and other is on the starboard side. The cox steers the boat using a rudder and may be seated at the stern of the boat (from where there is a view of the crew) or in the bow (known as a bowloader). With a bowloader, amplification is needed to communicate with the crew which is sitting behind, but the cox has a better view of the course, and the weight distribution may help the boat go faster. When there is no cox, the boat is referred to as a "coxless pair".

== See also ==
- Rowing at the Summer Olympics
- World Rowing Championships
