= Dave Ross (rower) =

Canadian rower

Personal information
- Nationality: Canadian
- Born: 16 November 1963 (age 61); Duncan, British Columbia, Canada

Sport
- Sport: Rowing

Dave Ross (born 16 November 1963) is a Canadian former rower. He competed at the 1984 Summer Olympics and the 1988 Summer Olympics. He graduated from Yale College and Harvard Business School.
