= Robert Espeseth =

American rower (born 1953)

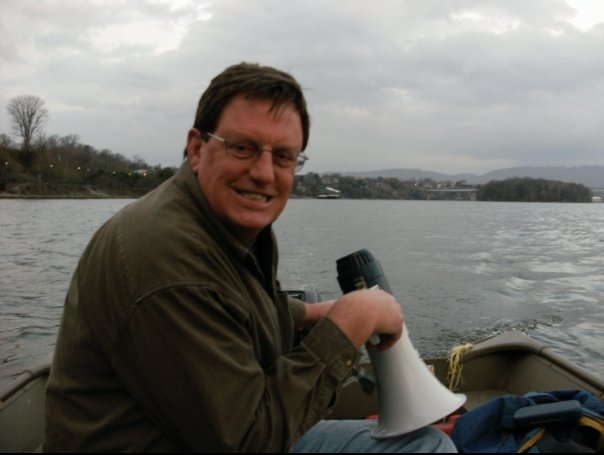
- Espeseth coaching the UTC rowing team

Personal information
- Full name: Robert Douglas Espeseth Jr.
- Born: October 25, 1953 (age 72) Philadelphia, Pennsylvania, U.S.
- Occupation: Rowing coach
- Years active: 1989–present
Medal record
Men's rowing
Representing the United States
Olympic Games
Bronze medal – third place	1984 Los Angeles	Coxed pair

Robert Douglas Espeseth Jr. (born October 25, 1953) an American former competitive rower and Olympic medal winner. He was born in Philadelphia, Pennsylvania.

== Olympics ==
Espeseth was a participant in the 1976 Summer Olympics and an alternate on the US rowing team for the 1980 Summer Olympics but did not compete due to the U.S. Olympic Committee's boycott of the 1980 Summer Olympics in Moscow, Russia. He was one of 461 athletes to receive a Congressional Gold Medal many years later. Espeseth and teammates Douglas Herland and Kevin Still won the bronze medal in the Men's Pair with coxswain (2+) event with a time of 7:12.81 at the 1984 Summer Olympics.

== World championship ==
At the 1986 World Championships in Nottingham, England, he placed first in the coxless 4 (4-) boat and took third place the following year in the same event in Copenhagen, Denmark. He was considered one of the favorites to win the coxed pair in the 1988 Summer Olympics with partner Daniel Lyons, but became sick and was unable to compete.

== Halls of fame ==
A University of Wisconsin–Madison alumnus, Espeseth is a member of the UW Athletic Hall of Fame, UW Rowing Hall of Fame, and the US Rowing Hall of Fame.

As of 2014, Espeseth is currently the coach of the University of Tennessee at Chattanooga Rowing Mocs.

== Coaching positions ==
- Crew Coach (University of Tennessee at Chattanooga) (1989?–present)
- Coordinator of Club Sports (University of Tennessee at Chattanooga)
