= Walter Soares =

Brazilian rower

Personal information
- Full name: Walter Luis Hime Pinheiro Soares
- Nationality: Brazilian
- Born: 3 July 1959 (age 65)

Sport
- Sport: Rowing

Walter Luis Hime Pinheiro Soares (born 3 July 1959) is a Brazilian rower. He competed at the 1980 Summer Olympics and the 1984 Summer Olympics.
