= Jason Goepfert =

American financial researcher

- Born: November 1971 (age 54)
- Occupation: Columnist

Jason Goepfert (born November 1971) is an American researcher and columnist focused on the development of behavioral finance. Prior to founding Sundial Capital Research, he was the manager of back office operations for Deephaven Capital Management, a Minnesota-based hedge fund, and Wells Fargo's online brokerage unit.

== Early life ==
Goepfert was born in Grantsburg, Wisconsin. He was educated at Grantsburg High School, followed by the University of Minnesota Carlson School of Management where he was president of the freshman student council and member of the crew team.

After attending the university and joining a large community and investment bank, he developed proprietary indicators based on activity in the margin and options accounts. Once he left the finance industry, he created a newsletter and accompanying website that has become a primary source for investors looking for information related specifically to the objective measurement of sentiment data and education of investors.

== Career ==
Goepfert founded Sundial Capital Research as a conduit for his research into behavioral finance. He consulted for numerous prominent hedge funds and Wall Street banks before creating a retail product and contributing to broadcasts for U.S. and overseas financial publications, radio and television on the CNN, Fox and CNBC networks.

He has been interviewed or profiled in publications such as Traders, Stocks, Futures & Options, Futures and Independent Research magazines and spoken at numerous industry conferences for organizations such as the Market Technicians Association, National Association of Active Investment Managers and Minyanville Media.

In 2004, Goepfert was awarded the Charles H. Dow Award for excellence in the field of technical analysis by the Market Technicians Association. In the weeks after the award was given, a member of the MTA noticed that the work was similar to that of Norman Fosback in the 1970s. A subsequent investigation revealed that neither Goepfert nor members of the award committee were aware of Mr. Fosback's work. The committee determined that the paper still advanced the field of technical analysis and investor sentiment, so a revised version of the paper was released, and the MTA changed the way that the award is reviewed in order to increase the likelihood that a committee member would be familiar with prior work in the field that is not necessarily widely published or cited.

== Publications ==
Goepfert has been credited for advances in the fields of technical analysis or behavioral finance in a number of published books, academic journals and news media.

=== Books and Journals ===
- 2017: Chartered Market Technician, on the application of tracking general investor sentiment for market professionals.
- 2016: Technical Analysis, on the use of granular data for the construction of popular indicators such as the put/call ratio.
- 2014: Investing With The Trend, on recognizing the importance of market regimes in the application of sentiment data.
- 2014: Financial Tracker, on the potential for Twitter as a source of social sentiment.
- 2014: The New Trading For A Living, on the value of watching penny stock volume.
- 2013: Algorithmic Finance, on the potential for Twitter for algorithmic finance
- 2011: Time The Markets, on the application of cash balance as a reflection of sentiment.
- 2010: Buy, Don't Hold, on the application of ETF data as a new tool.
- 2009: Market Indicators, on using penny stock volume and mutual fund cash positions.
- 2008: The Journal of Investing, on the use of market breadth in a time of structural change.
- 2005: Trade Stocks & Commodities With The Insiders, on a way to use the data for stock index futures.

=== Patents ===
In 2007, he was used as a source in a patent filing for a unique way to monitor and express options trading activity. The patent was for a way of calculating and displaying the sentiment of options traders based on their opening transactions, and was based in part by a methodology outlined by Goepfert in a prior publication.

=== News Media ===
Goepfert is widely cited in U.S. financial media such as The Wall Street Journal, Bloomberg, The Financial Times, The Economist, The Washington Post, Forbes, The New York Times, Reuters, CBS News, CNN, FOX and CNBC and overseas publications such as Borsa & Finanza, Irish Times and The Telegraph for his outlook on markets or for background information on specific developments, indicators, or the general utility of using sentiment as a tool for investors.
