= Jon Fish =

American rower

Personal information
- Full name: Jonathan Scott Fish
- Born: June 22, 1962 (age 64) New York, New York, United States

Sport
- Sport: Rowing
Medal record
Representing United States
Pan American Games
Silver medal – second place	1991 Havana	Coxed fours
World Championships
Bronze medal – third place	1986 Nottingham	Coxed fours

Jonathan Scott Fish (born June 22, 1962) is an American rowing coxswain. He competed in the men's coxed pair event at the 1988 Summer Olympics.
