= Wojciech Jankowski =

Polish rower (born 1963)

Medal record

Men's rowing

Representing Poland
| Event | 1st | 2nd | 3rd |
|---|---|---|---|
| Olympic Games | 0 | 0 | 1 |
| World Championships | 0 | 1 | 2 |
| European Championships | 0 | 0 | 0 |
| Total | 0 | 2 | 2 |

Olympic Games
| Bronze medal – third place | 1992 Barcelona | Coxed fours |

World Rowing Championships
| Silver medal – second place | 1993 Račice | M4- |
| Bronze medal – third place | 1991 Vienna | M4+ |
| Bronze medal – third place | 1995 Tampere | M4- |

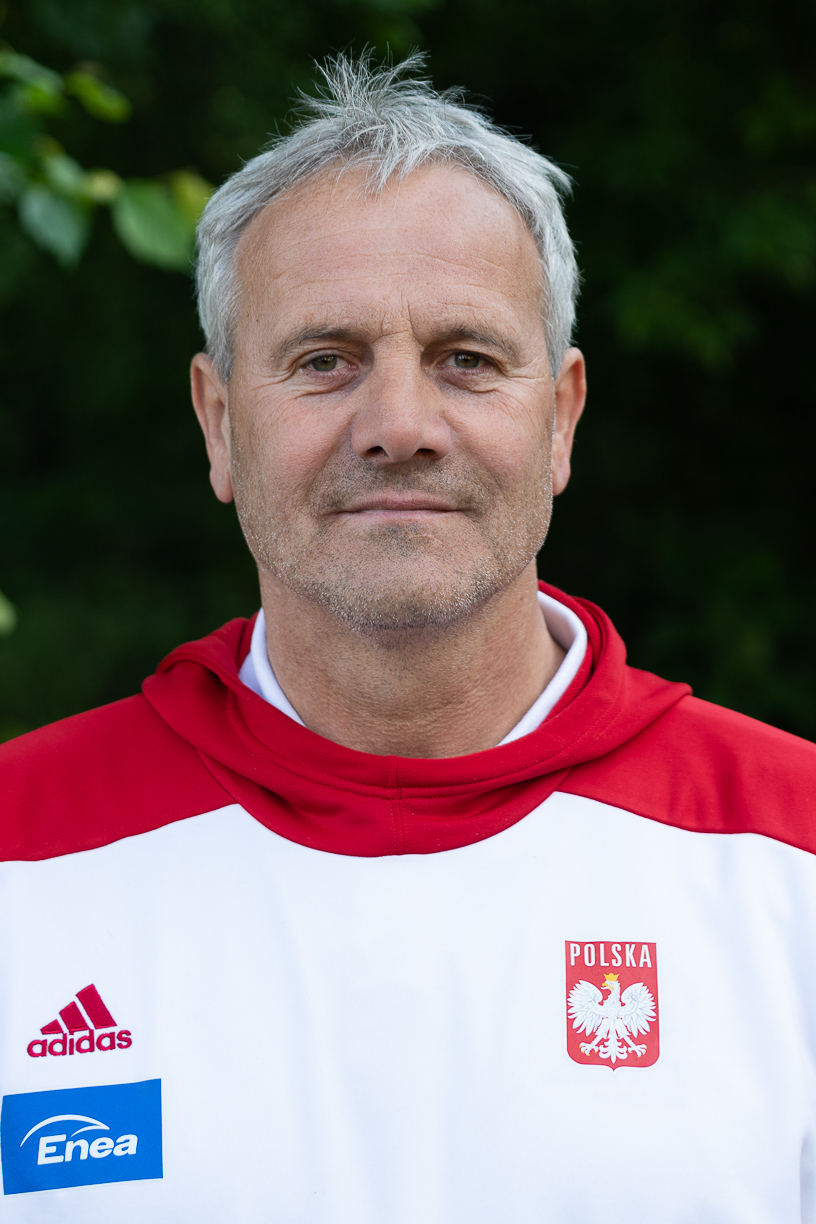
Wojciech Jankowski, Polish Rowing Coach

Wojciech Jankowski (born 1 April 1963) is a Polish rower.

In 2009, he was awarded the Knight's Cross of the Order of Polonia Restituta for outstanding contributions to the development of sport, for achievements in training and coaching as well as outstanding sporting achievements.
