= Philippe Cuelenaere =

Belgian rower

Personal information
- Nationality: Belgian
- Born: 2 September 1971 (age 53); Ghent, Belgium

Sport
- Sport: Rowing
- Club: Royal Club Nautique de Gand

Philippe Cuelenaere (born 2 September 1971) is a Belgian rower. He competed in the men's coxed pair event at the 1984 Summer Olympics.
