= Isidro Martín =

Spanish rower (born 1959)

Personal information
- Full name: Isidro Luis Martín Solano
- Nationality: Spanish
- Born: 13 July 1959 (age 66)

Sport
- Sport: Rowing

Isidro Luis Martín Solano (born 13 July 1959) is a Spanish rower. He competed at the 1980 Summer Olympics and the 1984 Summer Olympics.
