= Jacek Streich =

Polish rower (born 1967)

Medal record

Men's rowing

Representing Poland
Event	1st	2nd	3rd
Olympic Games	0	0	1
World Championships	0	1	2
European Championships	0	0	0
Total	0	2	2

Olympic Games
Bronze medal – third place	1992 Barcelona	Coxed fours

World Rowing Championships
Silver medal – second place	1993 Račice	M4-
Bronze medal – third place	1991 Vienna	M4+
Bronze medal – third place	1995 Tampere	M4-

Jacek Franciszek Streich (born 12 October 1967 in Toruń) is a Polish rower.
