= Milan Škopek =

Czech rower

Personal information
- Nationality: Czech
- Born: 22 January 1959 (age 66); Prague, Czechoslovakia

Sport
- Sport: Rowing

Milan Škopek (born 22 January 1959) is a Czech rower. He competed at the 1980 Summer Olympics and the 1988 Summer Olympics.
