= Daniel Lyons (rower) =

American rower (born 1958)

Medal record

Men's rowing

Representing United States

World Rowing Championships
Gold medal – first place	1986 Nottingham	M4-
Bronze medal – third place	1981 Munich	M8+
Bronze medal – third place	1987 Copenhagen	M4-

Daniel K. Lyons (born March 8, 1958, in Upper Darby Township, Pennsylvania) is an American rower who competed in the 1988 Summer Olympics in the coxed pair.

Lyons has rowed on seven US National Teams, resulting in two world bronze medals, a world gold medal, and a gold medal at the Pan American Games. After winning 11 national rowing championships, he was inducted into the US Rowing Hall of Fame.

At the 1988 Olympic Games, his partner Robert Espeseth became sick and he finished in 11th place with a replacement partner. Lyons has also coached rowing since 1983 at the US Naval Academy, St. Joseph's Prep in Philadelphia, Oxford University, Stanford University, Drexel University, Georgetown University, and Penn Athletic Club in Philadelphia.

In 1981, Lyons graduated from the United States Naval Academy. In 1987, he obtained a degree in politics, philosophy and economics from Oxford University. In 1989, he was granted his master's degree in American history by Villanova University. He later also pursued a Ph.D. in military history from Temple University. He has also taught history at the US Naval Academy and Rutgers University.

Lyons is now the president of leadership consultants Team Concepts, which counts Alcoa and Johnson & Johnson among its clients and 12 former Olympians on its staff.
