= Greg Searle =

British rower

Personal information
- Born: 20 March 1972 (age 54) Ashford, Surrey, England
- Relatives: Jonny Searle (brother)
Medal record
Men's rowing
Representing Great Britain
Olympic Games
Gold medal – first place	1992 Barcelona	Coxed pair
Bronze medal – third place	1996 Atlanta	Coxless four
Bronze medal – third place	2012 London	Eight
World Rowing Championships
Gold medal – first place	1993 Racice	Coxed pair
Silver medal – second place	1995 Tampere	Coxless four
Silver medal – second place	2010 Karapiro	Eight
Silver medal – second place	2011 Bled	Eight
Bronze medal – third place	1991 Vienna	Eight
Bronze medal – third place	1994 Indianapolis	Coxless four
Bronze medal – third place	1997 Aiguebelette	Single scull
World Rowing Junior Championships
Gold medal – first place	1989 Szeged	Coxless four
Gold medal – first place	1990 Aiguebelette	Coxless four

Gregory Mark Pascoe Searle MBE (born 20 March 1972) is a British Olympic rower educated at Hampton School and London South Bank University.

== Career ==
Greg Searle is an Olympic gold medalist, winning the coxed pairs event at the 1992 Barcelona Olympics with his brother Jonny Searle and cox Garry Herbert. He also won a World Championships gold medal in 1993 with his brother. In the 1996 Atlanta Olympics, he finished third in the coxless four event. Following Atlanta, he converted briefly to competing in the single scull (coached by Harry Mahon) where he won bronze at the 1997 World Rowing Championships and in the same year the single sculls' event at Henley Royal Regatta. He was a finalist in the men's pair at the 2000 Sydney Olympics with Ed Coode, finishing a disappointing and close fourth, having led much of the way.

After his retirement as an international rower, Searle joined the British sailing team in the America's Cup. He was a "grinder" in the 2002 Challenger Series.

He returned to international rowing at the age of 38 for the 2010 World Rowing Championships and was part of the British squad that topped the medal table at the 2011 World Rowing Championships in Bled, where he won a silver medal as part of the eight with Nathaniel Reilly-O'Donnell, Cameron Nichol, James Foad, Alex Partridge, Moe Sbihi, Tom Ransley, Daniel Ritchie and Phelan Hill.

He won an Olympic bronze medal, age 40, in the men's eight at London 2012.

Searle was awarded an MBE in the 1993 New Year's Honours, following his gold at Barcelona.

He is a steward of Henley Royal Regatta. Married to Jenny, he has two children, Josie and Adam. Cricketer, Laurie Evans is his nephew.
