= Ángelo Roso Neto =

Brazilian rower

Personal information
- Born: 5 July 1960 (age 64); Rio de Janeiro, Brazil

Sport
- Sport: Rowing

Ángelo Roso Neto (born 5 July 1960) is a Brazilian rower. He competed at the 1984 Summer Olympics and the 1988 Summer Olympics.
