= Bill Lang (rower) =

British rower (born 1956)

Personal information
- Nationality: British
- Born: 18 March 1956 (age 69); Pittsburgh, Pennsylvania, United States

Sport
- Sport: Rowing

Bill Lang (born 18 March 1956) is a British rower. He competed in the men's coxed pair event at the 1984 Summer Olympics.
