= Mariusz Zasada (footballer) =

Polish footballer

Personal information
- Full name: Mariusz Zasada
- Date of birth: 8 September 1982 (age 44)
- Place of birth: Łódź, Poland
- Height: 1.77 m (5 ft 9 1/2 in)
- Positions: Left-back; left winger

Senior career*
Years	Team	Apps	(Gls)
2000–2001	ChKS Łódź		
2002	Stal Głowno		
2002–2003	Ceramika Paradyż		
2003	ŁKS Łódź	11	(1)
2004–2005	Tur Turek		
2006–2011	Polonia Warsaw	81	(3)
2010–2011	→ Górnik Łęczna (loan)	27	(1)
2011–2015	Miedź Legnica	89	(3)
2016–2017	Sokół Aleksandrów Łódzki	42	(4)
2017–2018	Ner Poddębice	42	(8)
2019–2020	Warta Sieradz	23	(1)
2020–2021	LKS Różyca	27	(10)
2021–2022	Jutrzenka Bychlew	21	(5)
- * Club domestic league appearances and goals

Mariusz Zasada (born 8 September 1982) is a Polish former professional footballer who played as a left-back or left winger.

== Career ==
In July 2010, he was loaned to Górnik Łęczna on a one-year deal. He was released from Polonia Warsaw on 22 June 2011.

In July 2011, he joined Miedź Legnica.

== Honours ==
Miedź Legnica

- II liga West: 2011–12
