= Doug Herland =

American rower (1951–1991)

Olympic medal record

Men's rowing

Representing the United States
Bronze medal – third place	1984 Los Angeles	Coxed pairs

Douglas "Doug" John Herland (August 19, 1951 – March 26, 1991) was a 1984 Summer Olympics bronze medal Winner, coxing the Men's Pair with coxswain (2+) event. Following his successes at the Olympics, Herland began the "Freedom on the River" campaign, obtaining government funding for materials and equipment necessary for disabled people to row.

Throughout the rest of his life, Herland would continue to champion and promote adaptive rowing. Born with brittle bone disease (Osteogenesis Imperfecta), Herland stood a mere 4 ft 8 in (142 cm) and weighed 107 pounds (49 kg).

== Coaching positions ==
- Ewauna Rowing Club, Klamath Falls (1975–1978)
- Oregon Institute of Technology, Klamath Falls (1978-1980)
- University of Michigan (1980-198?)
- Pacific Lutheran University (1985–1988) --Took over the rowing program after the "retirement of Dave "Smed" Peterson (1974–1984).
