= India at the 2010 Asian Games =

- IOC code: IND
- NOC: Indian Olympic Association

in Guangzhou
- Competitors: 625 in 36 sports
- Flag bearers: Gagan Narang; Vijender Singh
- Medals Ranked 6th: Gold 14 Silver 17 Bronze 34 Total 65

Asian Games appearances (overview)
- 1951; 1954; 1958; 1962; 1966; 1970; 1974; 1978; 1982; 1986; 1990; 1994; 1998; 2002; 2006; 2010; 2014; 2018; 2022; 2026

India participated in the 2010 Asian Games in Guangzhou, China between 12–27 November 2010. The contingent was led by Gagan Narang. India put up its best ever performance at Asian Games. They finished the games at 65 medals including 14 golds which is India's third best performance ever since inception of Asian Games in 1951.

== Competitors ==
The following is a list of the number of competitors representing India in each sport at the Games:

Sport	Men	Women	Total
Aquatics – Swimming	9	0	9
Archery	4	4	8
Athletics	39	30	69
Badminton	9	8	17
Basketball	12	12	24
Billiards	10	7	17
Beach Volleyball	4	0	4
Boxing	10	3	13
Bowling	6	4	10
Chess	5	5	10
Cycling Road	2	3	5
Cycling Track	9	5	14
Equestrian	1	0	1
Fencing	10	9	19
Football	20	0	20
Golf	4	3	7
Gymnastics – Artistic	6	3	9
Handball	16	16	32
Field hockey	16	16	32
Judo	4	4	8
Kabaddi	12	12	24
Karate	3	3	6
Roller sports – Roller skating	6	6	12
Rowing	14	10	24
Sailing	7	1	8
Sepak takraw	12	12	24
Shooting	25	15	40
Canoeing Slalom	1	0	1
Canoeing Sprint	9	2	11
Squash	4	4	8
Table tennis	5	5	10
Taekwondo	6	4	10
Tennis – Lawn tennis	4	5	9
Tennis – Soft tennis	4	4	8
Triathlon	1	1	2
Volleyball	12	12	24
Weightlifting	8	4	12
Water Polo	0	13	13
Wrestling	13	4	17
Wushu	7	3	10
Total	361	264	625

== Medal summary ==
=== Medal table ===
Sport	Gold	Silver	Bronze	Total	vs 2006
Athletics	5	2	5	12	↑
Boxing	2	3	4	9	↑
Tennis	2	1	2	5	↑
Kabaddi	2	0	0	2	↑
Shooting	1	3	4	8	↓
Rowing	1	3	1	5	↑
Cue Sports	1	1	2	4	↔
Archery	0	1	2	3	↑
Wushu	0	1	1	2	↑
Golf	0	1	0	1	↔
Sailing	0	1	0	1	↔
Squash	0	0	3	3	↑
Wrestling	0	0	3	3	↓
Chess	0	0	2	2	↓
Roller Sports	0	0	2	2	♦
Swimming	0	0	1	1	♦
Gymnastics	0	0	1	1	♦
Hockey	0	0	1	1	↔
Total	14	17	34	64	↑

=== Multiple medalists ===
Name	Gold	Silver	Bronze	Total
Somdev Devvarman	2	0	1	3
Ashwini Chidananda Akkunji	2	0	0	2
Preeja Sreedharan	1	1	0	2
Ronjan Sodhi	1	0	1	2
Sanam Singh	1	0	1	2
Gagan Narang	0	2	0	2
Anil Kumar	0	2	0	2
Saji Thomas	0	2	0	2
Ranjit Singh	0	2	0	2
Jenil Krishnan	0	2	0	2
Manjeet Singh	0	2	0	2
Rajesh Kumar Yadav	0	2	0	2
Lokesh Kumar	0	2	0	2
Sania Mirza	0	1	1	2
Vishnu Vardhan	0	1	1	2
Aditya Mehta	0	1	1	2
Kavita Raut	0	1	1	2
Vijay Kumar	0	0	2	2
Saurav Ghosal	0	0	2	2
Anup Kumar Yama	0	0	2	2

=== Medalists ===
(vs 2006 Legends:: •: Debut, ↔: Defends, ↑: Improves, ↓: Down)

=== Gold ===
Medal	Name	Sport	Event	Date	vs 2006
Gold	Pankaj Advani	Cue Sports	Men's English Billiards Singles	14 November	↔
Gold	Bajrang Lal Takhar	Rowing	Men's Single Sculls	19 November	↑
Gold	Ronjan Sodhi	Shooting	Men's Double Trap	21 November	↑
Gold	Preeja Sreedharan	Athletics	Women's 10,000m	21 November	•
Gold	Sudha Singh	Athletics	Women's 3000m Steeplechase	21 November	•
Gold	Somdev Devvarman; Sanam Singh	Tennis	Men's Doubles	22 November	↔
Gold	Somdev Devvarman	Tennis	Men's Singles	23 November	•
Gold	Ashwini Chidananda Akkunji	Athletics	Women's 400m Hurdles	25 November	•
Gold	Joseph Abraham	Athletics	Men's 400m Hurdles	25 November	•
Gold	Vikas Krishan Yadav	Boxing	Men's 60 kg	25 November	•
Gold	India	Kabaddi	Women	26 November	•
Gold	India	Kabaddi	Men	26 November	↔
Gold	Manjeet Kaur; Ashwini Chidananda Akkunji; Sini Jose; Mandeep Kaur	Athletics	Women's 4 x 400m Relay	26 November	↔
Gold	Vijender Singh	Boxing	Boxing 75 kg	26 November	↑

=== Silver ===
Medal	Name	Sport	Event	Date	vs 2006
Silver	Gagan Narang; Abhinav Bindra; Sanjeev Rajput	Shooting	Men's 10m Air Rifle Team	13 November	↑
Silver	Gagan Narang	Shooting	Men's 10m Air Rifle	13 November	•
Silver	Sonia Rai; Heena Sidhu; Annu Raj Singh	Shooting	Women's 10m Air Pistol Team	14 November	↔
Silver	Yasin Merchant; Aditya Mehta; Brijesh Damani	Cue Sports	Men's Snooker Team	15 November	↑
Silver	Sandhyarani Devi Wangkhem	Wushu	Women's Sanshou 60kg	17 November	•
Silver	Anil Kumar; Saji Thomas; Ranjit Singh; Jenil Krishnan	Rowing	Men's Coxless Four	18 November	↔
Silver	Lokesh Kumar; Manjeet Singh; Rajesh Kumar Yadav; Satish Joshi	Rowing	Men's Lightweight Coxless Four	18 November	↔
Silver	Anil Kumar; Girraj Singh; Saji Thomas; Lokesh Kumar; Manjeet Singh; Rajesh Kumar Yadav; Ranjit Singh; Satish Joshi; Jenil Krishnan	Rowing	Men's Eight	19 November	•
Silver	Abhinav Lohan; Abhijit Singh Chadha; Rahul Bajaj; Rashid Khan	Golf	Men's Team	20 November	↔
Silver	Balraj; Trunal Balkrishna Helegaonkar; Atool Sinha; Farokh Faramroze Tarapore; Shekhar Singh Yadav	Sailing	Match Racing	20 November	↔
Silver	Kavita Raut	Athletics	Women's 10,000m	21 November	•
Silver	Sania Mirza; Vishnu Vardhan	Tennis	Mixed Doubles	22 November	↓
Silver	Tarundeep Rai	Archery	Men's Individual	24 November	•
Silver	Dinesh Kumar	Boxing	Men's 81kg	25 November	•
Silver	Preeja Sreedharan	Athletics	Women's 5,000m	26 November	•
Silver	V Santhosh Kumar	Boxing	Men's 64kg	26 November	•
Silver	Manpreet Singh	Boxing	Men's 91kg	26 November	•

=== Bronze ===
Medal	Name	Sport	Event	Date	vs 2006
Bronze	Vijay Kumar	Shooting	Men's 10m Air Pistol	14 November	•
Bronze	Vijay Kumar	Shooting	Men's 25m Center Fire Pistol	18 November	↔
Bronze	Alok Kumar	Cue Sports	Men's 8-Ball Singles	14 November	•
Bronze	Somdev Devvarman; Sanam Singh; Vishnu Vardhan; Karan Rastogi	Tennis	Men's Team	15 November	•
Bronze	Virdhawal Khade	Swimming	Men's 50m Butterfly	16 November	•
Bronze	Harika Dronavalli	Chess	Women's Individual Rapid	16 November	↓
Bronze	Ashish Kumar	Gymnastics	Men's Floor	16 November	•
Bronze	M Bimoljit Singh	Wushu	Men's Sanshou 60kg	16 November	↔
Bronze	Pratima Puhan; Pramila Prava Minz	Rowing	Women's Coxless Pair	19 November	•
Bronze	Manavjit Singh Sandhu; Mansher Singh; Zoravar Singh Sandhu	Shooting	Men's Trap Team	19 November	↓
Bronze	Aditya Mehta	Cue Sports	Men's Snooker Singles	20 November	•
Bronze	Saurav Ghosal	Squash	Men's singles	20 November	↔
Bronze	Asher Noria; Ronjan Sodhi; Vikram Bhatnagar	Shooting	Men's Double Trap Team	21 November	↓
Bronze	Deepika Kumari; Dola Banerjee; Rimil Buriuly	Archery	Women's Team	21 November	•
Bronze	Ravinder Singh	Wrestling	Men's Greco-Roman 60kg	21 November	•
Bronze	Sunil kumar Rana	Wrestling	Men's Greco-Roman 66kg	21 November	•
Bronze	Sania Mirza	Tennis	Women's Singles	21 November	↓
Bronze	Rahul Banerjee; Tarundeep Rai; Mangal Singh Champia	Archery	Men's Team	22 November	↔
Bronze	Krishna Poonia	Athletics	Women's Discus throw	23 November	↔
Bronze	Pramila Aiyappa	Athletics	Women's Heptathlon	23 November	↔
Bronze	Joshna Chinappa; Dipika Pallikal; Anaka Alankamony; Anwesha Reddy	Squash	Women's Team	24 November	•
Bronze	Harinder Sandhu; Sidhartha Suchde; Sandeep Jangra; Saurav Ghosal	Squash	Men's Team	24 November	•
Bronze	Suranjoy Singh	Boxing	Men's 52kg	24 November	•
Bronze	Paramjeet Samota	Boxing	Men's +91kg	24 November	•
Bronze	M C Mary Kom	Boxing	Women's 51kg	24 November	•
Bronze	Kavita Goyat	Boxing	Women's 75kg	24 November	•
Bronze	India	Hockey	Men	25 November	↑
Bronze	Mausam Khatri	Wrestling	Men's Freestyle 96 kg	25 November	•
Bronze	Tintu Luka	Athletics	Women's 800m	25 November	•
Bronze	Anup Kumar Yama	Roller Sports	Men's Free Skating	26 November	•
Bronze	Anup Kumar Yama; Avani Bharat Kumar Panchal	Roller Sports	Pairs Skating	26 November	•
Bronze	Kavita Raut	Athletics	Women's 5,000m	26 November	•
Bronze	P Harikrishna; Krishnan Sasikiran; Surya Shekhar Ganguly; G N Gopal; B Adhiban	Chess	Men's Team Standard	26 November	•
Bronze	Vikas Gowda	Athletics	Men's Discus	Promotion Due To Doping	•

== Archery ==
=== Men ===
Athlete	Event	Ranking Round		Round of 64	Round of 32	Round of 16	Quarterfinals	Semifinals	Final
Athlete	Event	Score	Seed	Opposition Score	Opposition Score	Opposition Score	Opposition Score	Opposition Score	Opposition Score
Rahul Banerjee	Individual	1335	8th	Bye	Muktan (NEP); W 4–0	Sung C-c (TPE); L 0–6	Did not advance		
Tarundeep Rai	Individual	1332	9th	Bye	Dao T K (VIE); W 5–1	Cheng C S (MAS); W 6–2	Oh J-h (KOR); W 6–4	Sung C-c (TPE); W 7–3	Kim W-j (KOR); L 3–7 (silver)
Mangal Singh Champia	Individual	1331	10th	Did not advance					
Jayanta Talukdar	Individual	1330	12th	Did not advance					
Rahul Banerjee; Mangal Singh Champia; Jayanta Talukdar	Team	3996	4th	—N/a		Bangladesh (BAN); W 221-186	Nepal (NEP); W 221-194	South Korea (KOR); L 216-222	Bronze medal match: Chinese Taipei (TPE); W 220-216 (bronze)

=== Women ===
Athlete	Event	Ranking Round		Round of 32	Round of 16	Quarterfinals	Semifinals	Final
Athlete	Event	Score	Seed	Opposition Score	Opposition Score	Opposition Score	Opposition Score	Opposition Score
Deepika Kumari	Individual	1329	7th	Saad (IRQ); W 5–1	Safitri (INA); W 7–3	Tan Y-t (TPE); W 6–4	Yun O-h (KOR); L 2–6	Bronze medal match: Kwon U-s (PRK); L 2–6
Rimil Buriuly	Individual	1298	18th	Dehghan (IRI); W 4–0	Tan Y-t (TPE); L 2–6	Did not advance		
Bombayala Devi	Individual	1270	28th	Did not advance				
Dola Banerjee	Individual	1264	29th	Did not advance				
Dola Banerjee; Rimil Buriuly; Deepika Kumari	Team	3891	5th		Vietnam (VIE); W 225-152	North Korea (PRK); W 214-202	South Korea (KOR); L 221^{26}-221^{29}	Bronze medal match: Chinese Taipei (TPE); W 218-217 (bronze)

== Athletics ==
=== Men ===
Track events

Event	Athletes	Heat Round 1		Semifinal		Final	
Event	Athletes	Result	Rank	Result	Rank	Result	Rank
100 m	Qureshi Mohammed Abdul Najeeb	10.50	4th QS	10.46	4th	Did not advance	
100 m	Krishnakumar Satish Rane	10.64	6th QS	10.62	4th	Did not advance	
200 m	Sathya Suresh	21.02	1st QF			21.07	6th
200 m	Dharambir	21.52	4th			Did not advance	
400 m	Bibin Mathew	46.93	4th			Did not advance	
400 m	Mortaja Shake	47.75	4th			Did not advance	
800 m	Sajeesh Joseph	1:49.58	3rd			Did not advance	
800 m	Francis Sagayaraj Pathi	1:50:18	3rd			Did not advance	
1500 m	Hamza Chatholi	3:46.68	4th QF			3:44.25	7th
1500 m	Sandeep Karan Singh	3:53.88	4th QF			3:42.79 PB	6th
5000 m	Sunil Kumar					14:01.76 SB	8th
10000 m	Suresh Kumar					28:59.98 PB	8th
110 m hurdles	Siddhanth Thingalaya	DNF				Did not advance	
400 m hurdles	Joseph Abraham	50.93	1st QF			49.96 SB	1st place, gold medalist(s)
3000 m steeplechase	Elam Singh					8:47.34	6th
4x100 m relay	Rahamatulla Molla; Sathya Suresh; Naseema Mon; Qureshi Najeeb; Nagaraj Bharmappa Gobbaragumpi*; Ritesh Anand*	39.62	2nd QF			39.10	4th
4x400 m relay	Kunhu Puthanpurakkal; Bibin Mathew; Premanand Jayakumar; Mortaja Shake; Jithin Paul*; Bineesh Baby*	3:07.00	2nd QF			3:06.49	4th

* Participated in the heats only.

Field events

Event	Athletes	Qualification		Final	
Event	Athletes	Result	Rank	Result	Rank
High jump	Nikhil Chittarasu	2.10	8th	Did not advance	
High jump	Hari Roy	2.10	4th QF	2.10	12th
Long jump	Ankit Sharma			7.19	9th
Long jump	Maha Singh			7.44	7th
Triple jump	Renjith Maheshwary			16.76	4th
Triple jump	Amarjit Singh			16.15	7th
Shot put	Om Karhana			19.17	4th
Shot put	Sourabh Vij			18.98	6th
Discus throw	Vikas Gowda			63.13	3rd place, bronze medalist(s)
Javelin throw	Singh Rajender			74.70	6th
Javelin throw	Kashinath Naik			73.96	8th

Road events

Event	Athletes		
Event	Athletes	Final	
Event	Athletes	Result	Rank
20 km walk	Harminder Singh	1:26:33	6th
20 km walk	Baljinder Singh	1:28:06	7th
Marathon	Ram Singh Yadav	2:39:23	15th

Combined events

Decathlon
Event	Bharat Inder Singh			Vinod Joseph		
Event	Results	Points	Rank	Results	Points	Rank
100 m	11.06	847	8th	11.05	850	6th
Long jump	7.12	842	6th	6.91	792	7th
Shot put	14.50	759	3rd	14.31	747	4th
High jump	1.91	723	6th	1.85	670	9th
400 m	DNF			51.84	732	8th
110 m hurdles	DNS			DNS		
Discus throw	DNS			DNS		
Pole vault	DNS			DNS		
Javelin throw	DNS			DNS		
1500 m	DNS			DNS		
Final Total		DNF			DNF	

=== Women ===
Track events

Event	Athletes	Heat Round 1		Semifinal		Final	
Event	Athletes	Result	Rank	Result	Rank	Result	Rank
100 m	Jyoth Manjunath	12.04	4th QS	11.98	8th	Did not advance	
200 m	Tiana Mary Thomas	24.62	4th			Did not advance	
200 m	Sathi Geetha	24.08	3rd QF			23.91 SB	5th
400 m	Mandeep Kaur	53.93	3rd QF			52.99	4th
400 m	Manjeet Kaur	53.13	3rd QF			53.27	5th
800 m	Tintu Luka	2:03.85	1st QF			2:01.36	3rd place, bronze medalist(s)
800 m	Sinimole Paulose	2:03.83	3rd QF			2:06.95	7th
1500 m	Jhuma Khatun					4:13.46	5th
1500 m	Orchatteri P. Jaisha					4:19.62	7th
5000 m	Preeja Sreedharan					15:15.89 PB	2nd place, silver medalist(s)
5000 m	Kavita Raut					15:16.54 PB	3rd place, bronze medalist(s)
10000 m	Preeja Sreedharan					31:50.47 NR	1st place, gold medalist(s)
10000 m	Kavita Raut					31:51.44 PB	2nd place, silver medalist(s)
400 m hurdles	Ashwini Akkunji	56.43 PB	1st QF			56.15 PB	1st place, gold medalist(s)
400 m hurdles	Jauna Murmu	57.17 PB	1st QF			56.88 PB	4th
3000 m steeplechase	Sudha Singh					9:55.67 GR,NR	1st place, gold medalist(s)
3000 m steeplechase	Orchatteri P. Jaisha					10:18.97	5th
4x100 m relay	Sathi Geetha; Srabani Nanda; P. K. Priya; Jyothi Manjunath	45.44	3rd QF			45.23 PB	5th
4x400 m relay	Manjeet Kaur; Ashwini Akkunji; Sini Jose; Mandeep Kaur					3:29.02	1st place, gold medalist(s)

Field events

Event	Athletes	Final	
Event	Athletes	Result	Rank
High jump	Sahana Kumari	1.84	7th
Long jump	Mayookha Johny	6.33	7th
Long jump	Prajusha Anthony	6.11	9th
Triple jump	Prajusha Anthony	DNS	
Discus throw	Krishna Poonia	61.94	3rd place, bronze medalist(s)
Discus throw	Harwant Kaur	57.55	4th
Javelin throw	Saraswathi Sundaram	47.43	10th
Hammer throw	Hardeep Kaur	60.54	4th

Combined events

Heptathlon
Event	Pramila Aiyappa			Susmita Singhardy		
Event	Results	Points	Rank	Results	Points	Rank
100 m hurdles	14.40	923	3rd	14.72	879	5th
High jump	1.65	795	4th	1.65	795	3rd
Shot put	11.76	645	2nd	10.78	581	4th
200 m	25.50	841	2nd	26.11	788	4th
Long jump	5.98	843	2nd	5.38	665	5th
Javelin throw	41.61	698	2nd	37.27	615	4th
800 m	2:31.83	670	5th	2:27.24	728	2nd
Final Total		5415	3rd place, bronze medalist(s)		5051	4th

== Badminton ==
=== Men ===
Athlete	Event	Round of 32	Round of 16	Quarterfinals	Semifinals	Final
Athlete	Event	Opposition Score	Opposition Score	Opposition Score	Opposition Score	Opposition Score
Arvind Bhat	Singles	Mohamed Sharim (MDV) 'W WO	Boonsak Ponsana (THA); L 0-2 (19-21, 12-21)	Did not advance		
Parupalli Kashyap	Singles	Nguyen Tien Minh (VIE); L 0-2 (14-21, 20-22)	Did not advance			
Akshay Dewalkar; Arun Vishnu	Doubles	Dinuka Karunaratne and Niluka Karunaratne (SRI) 'W WO	Jung Jae-Sung and Lee Yong-Dae (KOR); L 0-2 (14-21, 14-21)	Did not advance		
Sanave Arattukulam; Rupesh Kumar Kallay	Doubles	BYE	Koo Kien Keat and Tan Boon Heong (MAS); L 0-2 (15-21, 19-21)	Did not advance		
Chetan Anand; Sanave Arattukulam; Arvind Bhat; Akshay Dewalkar; Arun Vishnu; Rupesh Kumar Kallay; Parupalli Kashyap; Gurusai Datt; Valiyaveetil Diju	Team		Chinese Taipei (TPE); L 1-3 (1-2, 0-2, 2-1, 0-2)	Did not advance		

=== Women ===
Athlete	Event	Round of 32	Round of 16	Quarterfinals	Semifinals	Final
Athlete	Event	Opposition Score	Opposition Score	Opposition Score	Opposition Score	Opposition Score
Aditi Mutatkar	Singles	Thilini Jayasinghe (SRI); W 2-0 (21-11, 21-19)	Eriko Hirose (JPN); L 1-2 (22-20, 8-21, 12-21)	Did not advance		
Saina Nehwal	Singles	BYE	Lydia Cheah (MAS); W 2-0 (21-15, 21-17)	Yip Pui Yin (HKG); L 1-2 (8-21, 21-8, 19-21)	Did not advance	
Aparna Balan; Prajakta Sawant	Doubles	Marylen Ng and Woon Khe Wei (MAS); L 0-2 (17-21, 7-21)	Did not advance			
Jwala Gutta; Ashwini Ponnappa	Doubles	Savitree Amitrapai and Punyada Munkitchokecharoen (THA); W 1-0 (21-13, RET)	Tian Qing and Zhao Yunlei (CHN); L 0-2 (10-21, 5-21)	Did not advance		
Aparna Balan; Jwala Gutta; Ashwini Ponnappa; Trupti Murgunde; Aditi Mutatkar; Saina Nehwal; Arundhati Pantawane; Prajakta Sawant	Team		Indonesia (INA); L 2-3 (2-0, 2-1, 0-2, 0-2, 0-2)	Did not advance		

=== Mixed ===
Athlete	Event	Round of 32	Round of 16	Quarterfinals	Semifinals	Final
Athlete	Event	Opposition Score	Opposition Score	Opposition Score	Opposition Score	Opposition Score
Arun Vishnu; Aparna Balan	Doubles	Shintaro Ikeda and Reiko Shiota (JPN); L 1-2 (22-20, 7-21, 12-21)	Did not advance			
Valiyaveetil Diju; Jwala Gutta	Doubles	BYE	Shin Baek-cheol and Lee Hyo-jung (KOR); L 1-2 (21-17, 13-21, 16-21)	Did not advance		

== Basketball ==
=== Men ===
Team

Vishesh Bhriguvanshi
Dinesh Coimbatore Venugopal
Jayram Jat
Hareesh Koroth
Prakash Mishra
Eudrick Pereira
Trideep Rai
Sunil Kumar Rathee
Dishant Vipul Shah
Jagdeep Singh
Kiran Pal Singh
Yadwinder Singh

Qualifying round

Group D

Team	Pld	W	L	PF	PA	PD	Pts
India	1	1	0	83	76	+7	2
Afghanistan	1	0	1	76	83	−7	1

November 15
19:15

Afghanistan	76–83	India
Scoring by quarter: 16–14, 22–16, 15–23, 23–30
Pts: Mojaddidi 25; Rebs: Mashriqi 12; Asts: Etemadi, Mojaddidi 5		Pts: J. Singh 22; Rebs: J. Singh 8 Asts: Rai 5

Guangti Gymnasium, Guangzhou
Referees: Cristiano Maranho (BRA), Ferdinand Pascual (PHI), Fong Kin Lung (HKG)

Preliminary round

Group F

Team	Pld	W	L	PF	PA	PD	Pts	Tiebreaker
Japan	5	4	1	352	317	+35	9	1–0
Iran	5	4	1	360	286	+74	9	0–1
Philippines	5	3	2	356	323	+33	8	1–0
Qatar	5	3	2	371	383	−12	8	0–1
Chinese Taipei	5	1	4	365	356	+9	6	
India	5	0	5	292	431	−139	5	

November 16
19:15

Qatar	97–48	India
Scoring by quarter: 22–9, 32–11, 21–18, 22–10
Pts: Ngombo 19; Rebs: Ngombo, Ahmad 7 Asts: Four players 3		Pts: Koroth 24; Rebs: J. Singh 6 Asts: Bhriguvanshi 4

Huangpu Gymnasium, Guangzhou
Referees: Eddie Viator (FRA), Yun Jong-Hyun (KOR), Song Xiaojing (CHN)

November 17
21:30

Chinese Taipei	93–66	India
Scoring by quarter: 25–21, 22–6, 25–19, 21–20
Pts: Lin C.C. 23; Rebs: Lee H.L., Lin C.C. 5 Asts: Lee H.L. 10		Pts: J. Singh 22; Rebs: Rai, J. Singh 6 Asts: Bhriguvanshi 4

Ying Dong Gymnasium, Guangzhou
Referees: Ravshan Ganiev (UZB), Yun Jong-Hyun (KOR), Duan Zhu (CHN)

November 19
21:30

Iran	78–63	India
Scoring by quarter: 20–14, 24–15, 23–19, 11–15
Pts: Afagh 27; Rebs: Sohrabnejad 8 Asts: Kamrani 4		Pts: J. Singh 24; Rebs: Bhriguvanshi 8 Asts: Bhriguvanshi 4

Ying Dong Gymnasium, Guangzhou
Referees: Andy Cheung (HKG), Kim Young-Woo (KOR), Wang Mei (CHN)

November 21
21:30

India	57–78	Philippines
Scoring by quarter: 14–21, 16–10, 11–32, 16–15
Pts: J. Singh 14; Rebs: Koroth 7 Asts: Five players 1		Pts: Casio 18; Rebs: Taulava 9 Asts: Casio, Baracael, Williams 3

Ying Dong Gymnasium, Guangzhou
Referees: Jiang Zhiyuan (CHN), Lau Cheuk Fai (HKG), Yun Jong-Hyun (KOR)

November 22
21:30

India	58–85	Japan
Scoring by quarter: 21–25, 11–18, 14–14, 12–28
Pts: Bhriguvanshi 15; Rebs: Bhriguvanshi 12; Asts: Bhriguvanshi 5		Pts: Kinoshita 13; Rebs: Ito 12; Asts: Kinoshita 4

Huangpu Gymnasium, Guangzhou
Referees: Cristiano Maranho (BRA), Pak Jong-Sik (PRK), Duan Zhu (CHN)

=== Women ===
Team

Bharti Bharti
Geethu Anna Jose
Harjeet Kaur
Pushpa Maddu
Anitha Paul Durai
Smruthi Radhakrishnan
Rajapriyadharshini Rajaganapathi
Sneha Sanjay Rajguru
Raspreet Sidhu
Akanksha Singh
Prashanti Singh
Pratima Singh

Preliminary round

Group A

Team	Pld	W	L	PF	PA	PD	Pts
China	3	3	0	277	146	+131	6
South Korea	3	2	1	255	171	+84	5
Thailand	3	1	2	160	245	−85	4
India	3	0	3	137	267	−130	3

November 18
19:15

China	107–39	India
Scoring by quarter: 29–8, 27–13, 28–15, 23–3
Pts: Guan X. 16; Rebs: Chen N. 9 Asts: Zhang H.L. 5		Pts: Jose 12; Rebs: Jose, Pt. Singh 5 Asts: A. Singh, Durai, Sidhu 1

Huangpu Gymnasium, Guangzhou
Referees: Elena Chernova (RUS), Yoko Tomita (JPN), Amir Hossein Safarzadeh (IRI)

November 20
19:15

India	44–98	South Korea
Scoring by quarter: 11–25, 12–17, 8–23, 13–33
Pts: Jose, Durai 13; Rebs: Jose 11; Asts: Jose 2		Pts: Kim D.B. 21; Rebs: Kim K.R., Sin J.J. 7 Asts: Beon Y.H. 9

Ying Dong Gymnasium, Guangzhou
Referees: Yoko Tomita (JPN), Liu Wei (CHN), Tien Hsiao-lun (TPE)

November 22
14:15

India	54–62	Thailand
Scoring by quarter: 17–14, 3–22, 27–12, 7–14
Pts: Jose 20; Rebs: Jose 12; Asts: Jose 4		Pts: Kaichaiyapoom 13; Rebs: Kaichaiyapoom, Mathuros 7 Asts: Yothanan 3

Ying Dong Gymnasium, Guangzhou
Referees: Nadine Crowley (CAN), Andy Cheung (HKG), Peng Ling (CHN)

== Beach volleyball ==
=== Men ===
Athlete	Event	Preliminary Round			Round of 16	Quarterfinals	Semifinals	Finals
Athlete	Event	Opposition Score	Opposition Score	Opposition Score	Opposition Score	Opposition Score	Opposition Score	Opposition Score
Kasi Viswanatha Raju Mudunuri; Kiran Kumar Reddy Meda	Men's beach volleyball	Dmitriy Yakovlev (KAZ) and Alexey Kuleshov (KAZ); L 1-2 (12-21, 22-20, 15-17)	Rafi Asruki Nordin (MAS) and Khoo Chong Long (MAS); L 1-2 (13-21, 22-20, 11-15)	Nget Sothearith (CAM) and Mon Rom (CAM); W 2-1 (14-21, 21-13, 15-6)	Did not advance			
Jameeluddin Mohammed; Ravinder Reddy Sara	Men's beach volleyball	Kentaro Asahi (JPN) and Katsuhiro Shiratori (JPN); L 0-2 (14-21, 10-21)	Panupong Toyam (THA) and Niphon Nimnuan (THA); L 0-2 (14-21, 14-21)	Mahmoud Assam (QAT) and Ismael Al-Shieeb (QAT); W 2-1 (17-21, 21-16, 15-10)	Did not advance			

== Board games ==
=== Chess ===
Athlete	Event	Win	Draw	Lost	Points	Finals		Rank
Athlete	Event	Win	Draw	Lost	Points	Semifinal	Final	Rank
Ganguly Surya Shekhar	Men's individual rapid	Minhazuddin Ahmed (BAN); Salem AAbdulrahman Saleh (UAE); Darmen Sadvakasov (KAZ); Anton Filippov (UZB); Elshan Moradi (IRI); Wesley So (PHI)	0	Lê Quang Liêm (VIE); Rustam Kasimdzhanov (UZB); Murtas Kazhgaleyev (KAZ)	6.0			5th
Krishnan Sasikiran	Men's individual rapid	Abdullah Hassan (UAE); Mohammed Al-Modiahki (QAT); Nguyen Ngoc Truong Son (VIE); Wesley So (PHI)	Elshan Moradi (IRI)} Anton Filippov (UZB); Rustam Kasimdzhanov (UZB)	Lê Quang Liêm (VIE); Bu Xiangzhi (CHN)	5.5			9th
B Adhiban; Ganguly Surya Shekhar; Krishnan Sasikiran; Geetha Narayanan Gopal; Pendyala Harikrishna	Men's team classical	Kyrgyzstan (KGZ); 3.5-0.5; Uzbekistan (UZB); 4.0-0.0; Kazakhstan (KAZ); 2.5-1.5; Qatar (QAT); 3.5-0.5	Iran (IRI); 2.0-2.0	China (CHN); 1.5-2.5; Philippines (PHI); 1.5-2.5<	9.0	Philippines (PHI); L 1.5-2.5	Bronze medal match: Iran (IRI); W 3.5-0.5	3rd place, bronze medalist(s)
Dronavalli Harika	Women's individual rapid	Sharmin Sultana Shirin (BAN); Nafisa Muminova (UZB); Gulmira Dauletova (KAZ); Atousa Pourkashiyan (IRI); Irine Kharisma Sukandar (INA)	Hou Yifan (CHN); Pham Le Thao Nguyen (VIE); Tania Sachdev (IND)	Hoang Thi Bao Tram (VIE)	6.5			3rd place, bronze medalist(s)
Tania Sachdev	Women's individual rapid	Jannar Worya (IRQ); Gulmira Dauletova (KAZ); Guliskhan Nakhbayeva (KAZ); Tövshintögsiin Batchimeg (MGL); Altanulziigiin Enkhtuul (MGL)	Dronavalli Harika (IND)	Zhao Xue (CHN); Pham Le Thao Nguyen (VIE); Hou Yifan (CHN)	5.5			6th
Tania Sachdev; Dronavalli Harika; Eesha Karavade; Meenakshi Subbaraman; Nisha Mohota	Women's team classical	Turkmenistan (TKM); 3.5-0.5; Uzbekistan (UZB); 2.5-1.5; Vietnam (VIE); 2.5-1.5; Mongolia (MGL); 3.5-0.5; Bangladesh (BAN); 3.5-0.5; Syria (SYR); 4.0-0.0	China (CHN); 2.0-2.0	0	13.0	Uzbekistan (UZB); L 1.5-2.5	Bronze medal match: Vietnam (VIE); L 2.0-2.0	4th

== Bowling ==
=== Men ===
Athlete	Event	Games 1–6						Total	Average	Grand total	Rank
Athlete	Event	1	2	3	4	5	6	Total	Average	Grand total	Rank
Dhruv Sarda	Men's singles	241	169	171	225	241	193	1240	206.7		39th
Girish Ashok Gaba	Men's singles	181	179	212	230	197	206	1205	200.8		54th
Srinath Pobbathi	Men's singles	189	234	198	203	193	182	1199	199.8		57th
Dilbir Singh	Men's singles	168	174	234	198	180	180	1134	189.0		76th
Akaash Ashok Kumar	Men's singles	159	144	213	178	215	170	1079	179.8		88th
Shabbir Dhankot	Men's singles	238	179	167	125	155	214	1078	179.7		89th
Dilbir Singh; Akaash Ashok Kumar	Men's doubles	183	217	222	177	160	234	1193	198.8	2414	32nd
Dilbir Singh; Akaash Ashok Kumar	Men's doubles	180	233	194	194	203	217	1221	203.5	2414	32nd
Srinath Pobbathi; Girish Ashok Gaba	Men's doubles	171	179	200	145	193	191	1079	179.8	2268	41st
Srinath Pobbathi; Girish Ashok Gaba	Men's doubles	211	177	224	193	208	182	1189	198.2	2268	41st
Shabbir Dhankot; Dhruv Sarda	Men's doubles	179	207	212	180	186	144	1108	184.7	2218	43rd
Shabbir Dhankot; Dhruv Sarda	Men's doubles	199	169	159	198	216	169	1110	185.0	2218	43rd
Shabbir Dhankot; Dhruv Sarda; Srinath Pobbathi	Men's trios	247	174	208	168	205	199	1201	201.2	3557	23rd
Shabbir Dhankot; Dhruv Sarda; Srinath Pobbathi	Men's trios	194	254	181	154	247	175	1205	200.8	3557	23rd
Shabbir Dhankot; Dhruv Sarda; Srinath Pobbathi	Men's trios	192	184	186	226	139	224	1151	191.8	3557	23rd
Dilbir Singh; Akaash Ashok Kumar; Girish Ashok Gaba	Men's trios	152	209	140	171	189	206	1067	177.8	3362	27th
Dilbir Singh; Akaash Ashok Kumar; Girish Ashok Gaba	Men's trios	167	172	179	159	183	234	1094	182.3	3362	27th
Dilbir Singh; Akaash Ashok Kumar; Girish Ashok Gaba	Men's trios	180	201	215	191	202	212	1201	200.2	3362	27th
Dilbir Singh; Shabbir Dhankot; Dhruv Sarda; Srinath Pobbathi; Girish Ashok Gaba	Men's team of five	196	184	190	191	191	179	1131	188.5	5902	13th
Dilbir Singh; Shabbir Dhankot; Dhruv Sarda; Srinath Pobbathi; Girish Ashok Gaba	Men's team of five	222	179	190	192	205	176	1164	194.0	5902	13th
Dilbir Singh; Shabbir Dhankot; Dhruv Sarda; Srinath Pobbathi; Girish Ashok Gaba	Men's team of five	194	243	215	227	212	213	1304	217.3	5902	13th
Dilbir Singh; Shabbir Dhankot; Dhruv Sarda; Srinath Pobbathi; Girish Ashok Gaba	Men's team of five	214	189	157	214	200	194	1168	194.7	5902	13th
Dilbir Singh; Shabbir Dhankot; Dhruv Sarda; Srinath Pobbathi; Girish Ashok Gaba	Men's team of five	195	201	202	157	200	190	1145	190.8	5902	13th
Akaash Ashok Kumar	Men's team of five booster	150	225	224	211	155	157	1122	187.0		

All events

Athlete	Event	Singles	Doubles	Trío	Team	Total	Average	Rank
Dhruv Sarda	Men's all events	1240	1110	1205	1304	4859	202.46	58th
Girish Ashok Gaba	Men's all events	1205	1189	1201	1145	4740	197.50	68th
Srinath Pobbathi	Men's all events	1199	1079	1151	1148	4577	190.71	78th
Shabbir Dhankot	Men's all events	1078	1108	1201	1174	4561	190.04	79th
Dilbir Singh	Men's all events	1134	1193	1067	1131	4525	188.54	83rd
Akaash Ashok Kumar	Men's all events	1079	1221	1094	1122	4516	188.17	85th

=== Women ===
Athlete	Event	Games 1–6						Total	Average	Grand total	Rank
Athlete	Event	1	2	3	4	5	6	Total	Average	Grand total	Rank
Pratima Hegde	Women's singles	175	175	173	192	194	184	1093	182.2		46th
Swapna Mitra	Women's singles	168	195	161	181	148	192	1045	174.2		55th
Sumathi Nallabantu	Women's singles	DNS									
Namratha Karanth	Women's singles	DNS									
Pratima Hegde; Swapna Mitra	Women's doubles	162	164	166	216	177	192	1077	179.5	2216	29th
Pratima Hegde; Swapna Mitra	Women's doubles	187	160	195	163	227	207	1139	189.8	2216	29th
Sumathi Nallabantu	Women's doubles rooster	DNS									
Namratha Karanth	Women's doubles rooster	DNS									
Swapna Mitra	Women's trios booster	177	153	201	148	197	196	1072	178.7		
Pratima Hegde	Women's trios booster	211	194	191	162	147	211	1116	186.0		
Sumathi Nallabantu	Women's trios booster	DNS									
Namratha Karanth	Women's trios booster	DNS									
Swapna Mitra	Women's team of five booster	191	201	182	182	169	180	1105	184.2		
Pratima Hegde	Women's team of five booster	163	204	164	173	208	169	1081	180.2		
Sumathi Nallabantu	Women's team of five booster	DNS									
Namratha Karanth	Women's team of five booster	DNS									

All events

Athlete	Event	Singles	Doubles	Trío	Team	Total	Average	Rank
Swapna Mitra	Women's all events	1093	1077	1116	1081	4367	181.96	59th
Pratima Hegde	Women's all events	1045	1139	1072	1105	4361	181.71	60th

== Boxing ==
Athlete	Event	Round of 32	Round of 16	Quarterfinals	Semifinals	Final
Athlete	Event	Opposition Result	Opposition Result	Opposition Result	Opposition Result	Opposition Result
Amandeep Singh	Men's Light flyweight	Fahad Al-Faifi (KSA); W RSC R1 2:52	Muhammad Waseem (PAK); W 11-0	Victorio Saludar (PHI); L 1-6	Did not advance	
Suranjoy Singh	Men's Flyweight	Chatchai Butdee (THA); W 7-2	Kim Ju-Seong (KOR); W 8-6	Shahriyor Isakov (UZB); W 4-2	Chang Yong (CHN); L 5-6 (bronze)	Did not advance
Chhote Lal Yadav	Men's Bantamweight	BYE	Satoshi Shimizu (JPN); L 4-7	Did not advance		
Vikas Krishan Yadav	Men's Lightweight	Sailom Adi (THA); W 8-1	Amangeldi Hudaybergenov (TKM); W 8-1	Kim Chol-Song (PRK); W 4-2	Hurshid Tojibaev (UZB); W 7-0	Hu Qing (CHN); W 5-4 (gold)
V. Santhosh Kumar	Men's Light welterweight	BYE	Khir Akyazlan Azmi (MAS); W 6-1	Byambyn Tüvshinbat (MGL); W +3-3	Wuttichai Masuk (THA); W 5-1	Daniyar Yeleussinov (KAZ); L 1-16 (silver)
Dilbagh Singh	Men's Welterweight	BYE	Omar Mamedshayev (TKM); L 0-8	Did not advance		
Vijender Singh	Men's Middleweight	BYE	Yang Yu-ting (TPE); W 9-4	Cho Deok-Jin (KOR); W 13-2	Mohammad Sattarpour (IRI); W 10-7	Abbos Atoev (UZB); W 7-0 (gold)
Dinesh Kumar	Men's Light heavyweight		BYE	Heo Jin-Ho (KOR); W 10-6	Deepak Maharjan (NEP); W 7-1	Elshod Rasulov (UZB); L 4-10 (silver)
Manpreet Singh	Men's Heavyweight		BYE	Zaifula Maimaiti (CHN); W 6-4	Jahon Qurbonov (TJK); W 10-2	Mohammad Ghossoun (SYR); L 1-8 (silver)
Paramjeet Samota	Men's Super heavyweight		BYE	Fahad Al-Faifi (KSA); W RSC R2 1:35	Zhang Zhilei (CHN); L RSC R3 2:47 (bronze)	Did not advance
Mary Kom	Women's Flyweight		BYE	Ping Meng-chieh (TPE); W 16-2	Ren Cancan (CHN); L 7-11 (bronze)	Did not advance
Preeti Beniwal	Women's Lightweight		Oyungereliin Suvd-Erdene (MGL); W 8-2	Tassamalee Thongjan (THA); L RSCI R3 0:53	Did not advance	
Kavita Goyat	Women's Middleweight			Marina Volnova (KAZ); W 8-7	Li Jinzi (CHN); L 1-5 (bronze)	Did not advance

== Canoeing ==
=== Canoe-Kayak Flatwater ===
Men

Athlete	Event	Heats		Semifinals		Final	
Athlete	Event	Time	Rank	Time	Rank	Time	Rank
Jamesboy Singh	C-1 200 m	44.004	3rd QF	auto advancement		43.039	9th
Jamesboy Singh	C-1 1000 m	4:22.030	4th QS	4:15.277	1st QF	4:20.405	8th
Ajit Kumar Sha; Prakant Sharma	C-2 1000 m					4:20.217	7th
Negi Digvijay Singh	K-1 200 m	41.090	6th QS	40.417	5th	Did not advance	
Bhupender Singh	K-1 1000 m	3:57.275	5th QS	3:57.863	3rd QF	3:58.626	9th
Premananda Singh; Gyanjit Singh	K-2 200 m	39.569	6th QS	38.809	4th	Did not advance	
Premananda Singh; Gyanjit Singh	K-2 1000 m	3:37.633	6th QS	3:45.150	4th	Did not advance	
Ajit Singh; Negi Digvijay Singh; Bhupender Singh; Sanjay Singh	K-4 1000 m	3:13.691	4th QS	3:16.237	1st QF	3:13.309	7th

Women

Athlete	Event	Heats		Semifinals		Final	
Athlete	Event	Time	Rank	Time	Rank	Time	Rank
Ragina Kiro	K-1 200 m	49.227	5th QS	49.624	6th	Did not advance	
Ragina Kiro	K-1 500 m	2:09.270	4th QS	2:07.079	3rd QF	2:10.837	9th
Ragina Kiro; Dung Dung Sima	K-2 500 m	2:00.462	5th QS	2:01.147	4th	Did not advance	

=== Canoe-Kayak Slalom ===
Men

Athlete	Event	Preliminary				Semifinal		Final	
Athlete	Event	Run 1	Run 2	Total	Rank	Time	Rank	Time	Rank
Vikram Singh Bhandari	K-1	764.36	528.00	1292.36	9th	DNF		683.51	9th

== Cue Sports ==
Athlete	Event	Round of 64	Round of 32	Round of 16	Quarterfinals	Semifinals	Final
Athlete	Event	Opposition Result	Opposition Result	Opposition Result	Opposition Result	Opposition Result	Opposition Result
Vijay Goel	Men's Carom 3 Cushion Singles			Heo Jung-Han (KOR); L 5-40	Did not advance		
Dharminder Lilly	Men's Carom 3 Cushion Singles		Fahad Al-Barrak (KSA); W 40-16	Joji Kai (JPN); L 8-40	Did not advance		
Pankaj Advani	Men's English Billiards Singles		BYE	Ricky Yang (INA); W 3-0	Praprut Chaithanasakun (THA); W 3-2	Kyaw Oo (MYA); W 3-2	Nay Thway Oo (MYA); W 3-2 (gold)
Geet Sethi	Men's English Billiards Singles		BYE	Nay Thway Oo (MYA); L 1-3	Did not advance		
Sumit Talwar	Men's Eight-ball Singles	Mazen Berjaoui (LIB); W 7-5	Roberto Gomez (PHI); W 7-5	Ko Pin-yi (TPE); W 7-6	Irsal Nasution (INA); L 4-7	Did not advance	
Alok Kumar	Men's Eight-ball Singles	Bahauddin Faqiri (AFG); W 7-1	Efren Reyes (PHI); W 7-3	Lee Poh Soon (MAS); W 7-5	Ricky Yang (INA); W 7-4	Kuo Po-cheng (TPE); L 5-7 (bronze)	Did not advance
Manan Chandra	Men's Nine-ball singles	BYE	Nguyen Phuc Long (VIE); L 3-9	Did not advance			
Alok Kumar	Men's Nine-ball singles	Hisataka Kamihashi (JPN); L 4-9	Did not advance				
Pankaj Advani	Men's Snooker singles	BYE	Nisar Ahmed (QAT); W 4-3	Ding Junhui (CHN); L 1-4	Did not advance		
Aditya Mehta	Men's Snooker singles	BYE	Mazen Berjaoui (LIB); W 4-0	Wu Yu-lun (TPE); W 4-2	Ang Boon Chin (SIN); W 4-3	Marco Fu (HKG); L 1-4 (bronze)	Did not advance
Brijesh Damani; Aditya Mehta; Yasin Merchant	Men's Snooker team		BYE	Afghanistan; W 3-2	Singapore; W 3-1	Pakistan; W 3-0	China; L 1-3 (silver)
Indira Gowda	Women's Eight-ball Singles		Hend Al-Naser (KUW); W 5-3	Duong Thuy Vi (VIE); L 4-5	Did not advance		
Neeta Sanghvi	Women's Eight-ball Singles		Akimi Kajitani (JPN); L 3-5	Did not advance			
Neena Praveen	Women's Nine-ball singles		Junko Mitsuoka (JPN); L 3-7	Did not advance			
Meenal Thakur	Women's Nine-ball singles		Kim Ga-Young (KOR); L 2-7	Did not advance			
Vidya Pillai	Women's Six-red snooker singles		Doan Thi Ngoc Le (VIE); W 4-0	Chen Siming (CHN); L 1-4	Did not advance		
Chitra Magimairajan	Women's Six-red snooker singles		BYE	Lai Hui-shan (TPE); L 1-4	Did not advance		
Anuja Chandra; Chitra Magimairajan; Vidya Pillai	Women's Six-red snooker team			Singapore; W 3-0	Chinese Taipei; L 1-3	Did not advance	

== Cycling ==
=== Road ===
Men

Athlete	Event	Time	Rank
Sombir	Road race	4:15:15	27th
Atul Kumar	Road race	4:15:59	32nd
Sombir	Time trial	1:16:45.24	15th

Women

Athlete	Event	Time	Rank
Mahita Mohan	Road race	2:47:46	20th
Pana Chaudhary	Road race	2:48:41	26th
Y. Sunita Devi	Time trial	56:00.87	10th

=== Track ===
Sprints

Athlete	Event	Qualifying		1/16 Finals (Repechage)	1/8 Finals (Repechage)	Quarterfinals	Semifinals	Finals/ Classification races	
Athlete	Event	Time Speed	Rank	Opposition Time	Opposition Time	Opposition Time	Opposition Time	Opposition Time	Rank
Okram Bikram Singh	Men's sprint	11.496	13th Q	Hassan Ali Varposhti (IRI); L Repechage Race: Son Gyeong-Su (KOR); L	Did not advance				
Hylem Herbert Sara Prince	Men's sprint	11.634	14th Q	Feng Yong (CHN); L Repechage Race: Hsiao Shih-hsin (TPE); L	Did not advance				
Hylem Herbert Sara Prince; Okram Bikram Singh	Men's team sprint	50.318	6th Q					Did not advance	
Rameshwori Devi	Women's sprint	12.918	15th		Did not advance				
Rejani Vijaya Kumari	Women's sprint	13.607	16th		Did not advance				

Pursuits

Athlete	Event	Qualifying		1st round		Finals	
Athlete	Event	Time	Rank	Opposition Time	Rank	Opposition Time	Rank
Sombir	Men's individual pursuit	4:57.740	20th	Did not advance			
Rajender Kumar Bishnoi	Men's individual pursuit	5:00.557	22nd	Did not advance			
Y. Sunita Devi	Women's individual pursuit	4:12.008	14th	Did not advance			
Konsam Suchitra Devi	Women's individual pursuit	4:14.287	15th	Did not advance			
Atul Kumar; Vinod Malik; Dayalaram Saran; Satbir Singh; Sombir	Men's team pursuit	4:33.221	9th	Did not advance			

Keirin

Athlete	Event	1st round	Repechage	2nd round	Finals
Athlete	Event	Rank	Rank	Rank	Rank
Hylem Prince	Men's keirin	6th R	2nd Q	5th QB	9th B
Hylem Prince	Men's keirin	5th R	3rd	Did not advance	

Time Trial

Athlete	Event	Time	Rank
Mahita Mohan	Women's 500 m time trial	39.216	10th

Points races

Athlete	Event	Qualifying		Final	
Athlete	Event	Points	Rank	Points	Rank
Rajender Kumar Bishnoi	Men's points race	3	12th Q	-40	20th
Atul Kumar	Men's points race	0	10th Q	0	15th
Mahita Mohan	Women's points race			0	9th
Konsam Suchitra Devi	Women's points race			DNF	

== Equestrian ==
=== Jumping ===
Athlete	Horse	Event	Round 1		Round 2			Individual Final						Jump off	
Athlete	Horse	Event	Round 1		Round 2			Round A		Round B		Total		Jump off	
Athlete	Horse	Event	Penalties	Rank	Penalties	Total	Rank	Penalties	Rank	Penalties	Rank	Penalties	Rank	Jump Time	Rank
Kapilesh Bhate	London Olympics	Individual	21.00	31st	EL			Did not advance							

== Fencing ==
=== Men ===
Athlete	Event	Round of Poules		Round of 32	Round of 16	Quarterfinals	Semifinals	Final
Athlete	Event	Result	Seed	Opposition Score	Opposition Score	Opposition Score	Opposition Score	Opposition Score
Amardeep Basediya	Individual épée	0 W - 5 L	30th	Did not advance				
Ajinkya Dudhare	Individual épée	2 W - 3 L	21st	Mikhail Ivanov (KGZ); L 6-15	Did not advance			
Amardeep Basediya; Ajinkya Dudhare; J S Shagolsam	Team épée				Kazakhstan; L 35-45	Did not advance		
Rajeshor Singh Thounaojam	Individual foil	1 W - 5 L	24th	Did not advance				
Vijay Kumar	Individual foil	0 W - 6 L	27th	Did not advance				
Vijay Kumar; Tukaram Mehatra; Rajeshor Singh Thounaojam	Team foil				BYE	Iran; L 20-45	Did not advance	
Padma Kumaresan	Individual sabre	1 W - 4 L	21st	Did not advance				
Walia Notum	Individual sabre	1 W - 4 L	19th	Did not advance				
Padma Kumaresan; Walia Notum; S S Irengbam; V S Jamwal	Team sabre					China; L 21-45	Did not advance	

=== Women ===
Event	Athlete	Round of Poules		Round of 16	Quarterfinals	Semifinals	Final
Event	Athlete	Result	Seed	Opposition Score	Opposition Score	Opposition Score	Opposition Score
T Kabita Devi	Individual épée	2 W - 4 L	16th Q	Xu Anqi (CHN); L 7-15	Did not advance		
Dilna Valiyaparambath	Individual épée	2 W - 4 L	13th Q	Cheng Ya-wen (TPE); L 8-15	Did not advance		
T Kabita Devi; Dilna Valiyaparambath; Shammipreet Kaur	Team épée			Vietnam; L 38-45	Did not advance		
Wanglembam Roji Devi	Individual foil	1 W - 3 L	12th Q	Shiho Nishioka (JPN); L 7-15	Did not advance		
Sagolsem Bindu Devi	Individual foil	1 W - 4 L	13th Q	Jeon Hee-Sook (KOR); L 3-15	Did not advance		
Wanglembam Roji Devi; Sagolsem Bindu Devi; A Ramachandran	Team foil				China; L 7-45	Did not advance	
A. Chandchandalavada	Individual sabre	1 W - 4 L	15th	Did not advance			
Reesha Puthussery	Individual sabre	0 W - 5 L	18th	Did not advance			
A. Chandchandalavada; Reesha Puthussery; Komalpreet Shukla	Team sabre				China; L 16-45	Did not advance	

== Football ==
=== Men ===
Indian team consists of:

Goalkeepers : Laxmikant Kattimani, Gurpreet Singh Sadhu

Defenders: Denzil Franco, Abhishek Das, Robert Lalthalma, Rowilson Rodrigues, Raju Gaikwad, Dharmaraj Ravanan, Lalrozama Fanai

Midfielders: Lalrindika Ralte, Joaquim Abranches, Jewel Raja Shaikh, Jibon Singh, Manish Mathani, Milan Singh Ongnam, Subodh Kumar

Strikers: Jeje Lalpekhlua, Balwant Singh, Jagtar Singh, Malsawmfela

Pool matches

Group D

Pos	Team	Pld	W	D	L	GF	GA	GD	Pts
1	Qatar	3	2	1	0	4	1	+3	7
2	Athletes from Kuwait	3	2	0	1	4	2	+2	6
3	India	3	1	0	2	5	5	0	3
4	Singapore	3	0	1	2	1	6	−5	1

Source: RSSSF
November 7
16:00

Kuwait	2 – 0	India
Ajab 6', 53'	Report

Huadu Stadium, Guangzhou
Referee: Saeid Mozaffarizadeh (Iran)

November 9
16:00

Qatar	2 – 1	India
Al-Marri 80', 88'	Report	Ravanan 19'

Huadu Stadium, Guangzhou
Referee: Zhao Liang (China)

November 11
19:00

India	4 – 1	Singapore
Raja 13'; B. Singh 62'; J. Singh 67'; Mathani 75'	Report	Luo Zhenlun 83'

Huadu Stadium, Guangzhou
Referee: Kadhum Auda (Iraq)

1/8 finals

November 16
15:30

Japan	5 – 0	India
Nagai 17', 51'; Yamazaki 28'; Yamamura 45'; Mizunuma 63'	Report

Huangpu Sports Center, Guangzhou
Referee: Banjar Al-Dosari (Qatar)

== Golf ==
Men

Athlete	Event	Round 1	Round 2	Round 3	Round 4	Total	Par	Rank
Rashid Khan	Individual	71	68	74	72	285	-3	4th
Abhinav Lohan	Individual	75	70	74	72	291	+3	9th
Rahul Bajaj	Individual	81	79	78	72	310	+22	39th
Abhijit Singh Chadha	Individual	DSQ						
Rashid Khan; Abhinav Lohan; Rahul Bajaj; Abhijit Singh Chadha	Team	227	209	222	216	874	+10	2nd place, silver medalist(s)

Women

Athlete	Event	Round 1	Round 2	Round 3	Round 4	Total	Par	Rank
Shreya Ghei	Individual	80	81	78	79	318	+30	22nd
Vani Kapoor	Individual	82	79	81	79	321	+33	23rd
Gurbani Singh	Individual	82	80	80	81	323	+35	24th
Shreya Ghei; Vani Kapoor; Gurbani Singh	Team	162	159	158	158	637	+61	9th

== Gymnastics ==
=== Artistic gymnastics ===
Men
Individual Qualification & Team all-around Final

Athlete	Apparatus						Individual All-around		Team	
Athlete	Floor	Pommel horse	Rings	Vault	Parallel bars	Horizontal bar	Total	Rank	Total	Rank
Alok Ranjan	12.850	12.350	12.600	15.000	11.250	11.650	75.700	31st		
Ashish Kumar	14.750 Q	11.800	13.300	16.100	11.800	12.900	80.650 Q	17th		
Devesh Kumar	13.450				13.050		26.500	79th		
Mayank Srivastava		12.700	12.650	15.200	12.300	12.500	65.350	45th		
Rakesh Kumar Patra	13.000	12.450	13.500	14.600		12.750	66.300	44th		
Muliyil Shinoj	11.300	11.100	12.300	14.550	12.050	11.700	73.000	34th		
Team Total	54.050	49.300	52.050	60.900	49.200	49.850			315.350	10th

Individual

Athlete	Event	Final							
Athlete	Event	Floor	Pommel Horse	Rings	Vault	Parallel Bars	Horizontal Bar	Total	Rank
Ashish Kumar	Individual all-around	14.700	10.200	13.550	0.000	14.200	12.100	64.750	23rd
Ashish Kumar	Floor	14.925						14.925	3rd place, bronze medalist(s)

Women
Individual Qualification & Team all-around Final

Athlete	Apparatus				Individual All-around	
Athlete	Vault	Uneven bars	Balance beam	Floor	Total	Rank
Priti Das	11.150		11.100	8.250	30.500	30th
Dipa Karmakar	13.850 Q		11.700	10.900	36.450	28th
Meenakshi Meenakshi	12.150		11.500	9.350	33.000	29th

Individual

Athlete	Event	Final					
Athlete	Event	Vault	Uneven bars	Balance beam	Floor	Total	Rank
Dipa Karmakar	Vault	13.400				13.400	8th

== Handball ==
=== Men ===
Team

Deepak Ahlawat
Sachin Chaudhary
Greeniage Dcumna
Raghu Kumar Gurung
Naya Chandra Singh
Jain Prasad
Firoz Ahmad Khan
Amit Kumar
Manish Kumar
Parseed Kunduthodiyil
Navin Kumar Mishra
Sajesh Peringath
Mohinder Sinh Rawat
Neeraj Singh
Shamsher Singh
Binu Vasu

Preliminary round

Group A

Pos	Team	Pld	W	D	L	GF	GA	GD	Pts	Qualification
1	Japan	5	4	0	1	208	123	+85	8	Semifinals
2	Saudi Arabia	5	3	1	1	192	129	+63	7 (Note: Head-to-head result: KSA 32–31 QAT.)	Semifinals
3	Qatar	5	3	1	1	185	134	+51	7	Placement 5th–6th
4	China	5	2	2	1	178	109	+69	6	Placement 7th–8th
5	India	5	1	0	4	153	194	−41	2	Placement 9th–10th
6	Mongolia	5	0	0	5	88	315	−227	0	

Source: Results
Notes:

November 13; 14:00	China	41 – 21	India	Huashi Gymnasium, Guangzhou; Referees: Al-Marzouqi, Al-Nuaimi (UAE)
November 13; 14:00	Liu W., Zhou X.J., Zhang Z.Y. 5	(19–12)	Prasad 6	Huashi Gymnasium, Guangzhou; Referees: Al-Marzouqi, Al-Nuaimi (UAE)
November 13; 14:00	2× (yellow card) 4× (suspension) 1× (red card)	Report	2× (yellow card) 5× (suspension) 1× (red card)	Huashi Gymnasium, Guangzhou; Referees: Al-Marzouqi, Al-Nuaimi (UAE)

November 14; 15:45	India	28 – 37	Qatar	Huashi Gymnasium, Guangzhou; Referees: Al-Mizili, Al-Mawlani (BHR)
November 14; 15:45	N. Singh 9	(8–17)	Al-Raeiss 9	Huashi Gymnasium, Guangzhou; Referees: Al-Mizili, Al-Mawlani (BHR)
November 14; 15:45	1× (yellow card) 5× (suspension) 1× (red card)	Report	3× (yellow card) 4× (suspension) 1× (red card)	Huashi Gymnasium, Guangzhou; Referees: Al-Mizili, Al-Mawlani (BHR)

November 16; 17:30	Saudi Arabia	40 – 22	India	Huashi Gymnasium, Guangzhou; Referees: Ossipov, Porol (KAZ)
November 16; 17:30	Al-Zaer, Al-Enbaawi, Al-Salem 6	(18–10)	N. Singh 7	Huashi Gymnasium, Guangzhou; Referees: Ossipov, Porol (KAZ)
November 16; 17:30	3× (yellow card) 6× (suspension)	Report	1× (yellow card) 5× (suspension)	Huashi Gymnasium, Guangzhou; Referees: Ossipov, Porol (KAZ)

November 18; 17:30	Japan	54 – 26	India	Huashi Gymnasium, Guangzhou; Referees: Mousavian, Taghavi (IRI)
November 18; 17:30	Miyazaki 8	(26–13)	Prasad 10	Huashi Gymnasium, Guangzhou; Referees: Mousavian, Taghavi (IRI)
November 18; 17:30	3× (yellow card) 3× (suspension)	Report	2× (yellow card) 3× (suspension)	Huashi Gymnasium, Guangzhou; Referees: Mousavian, Taghavi (IRI)

November 20; 14:00	India	56 – 22	Mongolia	Huashi Gymnasium, Guangzhou; Referees: Liu, Liu (CHN)
November 20; 14:00	N. Singh 16	(20–8)	Baatarsuren 6	Huashi Gymnasium, Guangzhou; Referees: Liu, Liu (CHN)
November 20; 14:00	3× (yellow card) 2× (suspension) 1× (red card)	Report	3× (yellow card) 4× (suspension) 1× (red card)	Huashi Gymnasium, Guangzhou; Referees: Liu, Liu (CHN)

Placement 9th–10th

November 22; 18:00	India	34 – 29	Hong Kong	Huashi Gymnasium, Guangzhou; Referees: Chang, Liu (TPE)
November 22; 18:00	N. Singh 13	(17–16)	Ip S.Y. 7	Huashi Gymnasium, Guangzhou; Referees: Chang, Liu (TPE)
November 22; 18:00	1× (yellow card) 4× (suspension)	Report	3× (yellow card) 7× (suspension)	Huashi Gymnasium, Guangzhou; Referees: Chang, Liu (TPE)

=== Women ===
Team

Venkata Lakshmi Challguruvula
Dendukuri Madhavi
Gurmail Kaur
Gurpreet Kaur
Harleen Kaur
Rajwant Kaur
Manisha
Pano Mardi
Varuni Negi
Nisha Dilip Patil
Praseetha Prasannan
Preeti
Priyanka
Reena Kumari
Rita Devi
Sanjeeta

Preliminary round

Group B

Pos	Team	Pld	W	D	L	GF	GA	GD	Pts	Qualification
1	China	3	3	0	0	94	49	+45	6	Semifinals
2	Japan	3	2	0	1	82	68	+14	4	Semifinals
3	North Korea	3	1	0	2	90	74	+16	2	Placement 5th–6th
4	India	3	0	0	3	42	117	−75	0	Placement 7th–8th

Source: Results

November 18; 17:15	China	43 – 9	India	Guanggong Gymnasium, Guangzhou; Referees: Al-Mizili, Al-Mawlani (BHR)
November 18; 17:15	Wei Q.X. 10	(20–3)	Negi, Patil, Madhavi 3	Guanggong Gymnasium, Guangzhou; Referees: Al-Mizili, Al-Mawlani (BHR)
November 18; 17:15	3× (yellow card) 3× (suspension)	Report	3× (yellow card) 3× (suspension)	Guanggong Gymnasium, Guangzhou; Referees: Al-Mizili, Al-Mawlani (BHR)

November 20; 19:00	Japan	32 – 16	India	Guanggong Gymnasium, Guangzhou; Referees: Al-Mizili, Al-Mawlani (BHR)
November 20; 19:00	Fujii 6	(19–6)	R. Kaur, Patil 4	Guanggong Gymnasium, Guangzhou; Referees: Al-Mizili, Al-Mawlani (BHR)
November 20; 19:00	3× (yellow card) 3× (suspension)	Report	3× (yellow card) 2× (suspension)	Guanggong Gymnasium, Guangzhou; Referees: Al-Mizili, Al-Mawlani (BHR)

November 22; 20:45	India	17 – 42	North Korea	Guanggong Gymnasium, Guangzhou; Referees: Liu, Liu (CHN)
November 22; 20:45	Lakshmi 4	(8–23)	Pak Y.M. 8	Guanggong Gymnasium, Guangzhou; Referees: Liu, Liu (CHN)
November 22; 20:45	3× (yellow card) 2× (suspension)	Report	3× (yellow card) 5× (suspension)	Guanggong Gymnasium, Guangzhou; Referees: Liu, Liu (CHN)

Placement 7th–8th

November 25; 18:00	Thailand	25 – 15	India	Guanggong Gymnasium, Guangzhou; Referees: Li, Wang (CHN)
November 25; 18:00	Thanawat 8	(9–6)	Patil 5	Guanggong Gymnasium, Guangzhou; Referees: Li, Wang (CHN)
November 25; 18:00	3× (yellow card) 3× (suspension)	Report	3× (yellow card) 2× (suspension) 1× (red card)	Guanggong Gymnasium, Guangzhou; Referees: Li, Wang (CHN)

== Hockey ==
=== Men ===
Team

Arjun Halapa
Bharat Chikara
Bharat Kumar Chetri
Raghu Kumar Gurung
Danish Mujtaba
Gurbaj Singh
Tushar Khandker
Dhananjay Mahadik
Rajpal Singh
Sandeep Singh
Sardar Singh
Dharamvir Singh
Sarvanjit Singh
Shivendra Singh
Prabodh Tirkey
Vikram Pillay

Preliminary

Group B

Team	Pld	W	D	L	GF	GA	GD	Pts
India	4	4	0	0	22	4	+18	12
Pakistan	4	3	0	1	28	6	+22	9
Japan	4	2	0	2	13	13	0	6
Bangladesh	4	1	0	3	9	21	−12	3
Hong Kong	4	0	0	4	4	32	−28	0

November 15
14:30

India	7 – 0	Hong Kong
Chikara 2'; Sandeep 4', 18'; Sarvanjit 22'; Khandker 37'; Halappa 38'; Shivendra 48'	Report

Aoti Hockey Field 2, Guangzhou
Umpires:
Jang Jung-Min (KOR)
Lim Hong Zhen (SIN)

November 17
13:00

India	9 – 0	Bangladesh
Khandker 2', 39'; Sandeep 13', 47', 63', 66'; Shivendra 22'; Rajpal 37'; Dharamvir 69'	Report

Aoti Hockey Field 1, Guangzhou
Umpires:
Kim Hong-Lae (KOR)
Lim Hong Zhen (SIN)

November 20
15:00

India	3 – 2	Pakistan
Sandeep 3', 48'; Dharamvir 16'	Report	Butt 4'; Abbasi 43'

Aoti Hockey Field 1, Guangzhou
Umpires:
Simon Taylor (NZL)
Adam Kearns (AUS)

November 21
17:30

Japan	2 – 3	India
Sakamoto 21', 63'	Report	Rajpal 31'; Sandeep 38', 62'

Aoti Hockey Field 1, Guangzhou
Umpires:
Kim Hong-Lae (KOR)
Lim Hong Zhen (SIN)

Semifinals

November 23
17:30

India	3 – 4 (a.e.t.)	Malaysia
Sandeep 35'; Khandker 37'; Rajpal 54'	Report	T. Jalil 32'; Misron 49'; A. Rahim 67', 75'

Aoti Hockey Field 1, Guangzhou
Umpires:
Kim Hong-Lae (KOR)
Adam Kearns (AUS)

Bronze medal game

November 25
14:00

South Korea	0 – 1	India
	Report	Khandker 40'

Aoti Hockey Field 1, Guangzhou
Umpires:
Haider Rasool (PAK)
Lim Hong Zhen (SIN)

=== Women ===
Team

Saba Anjum Karim
Yogita Bali
Mukta Prava Bala
Deepika Thakur
Deepika Murthy
Jasjeet Kaur Handa
Joydeep Kaur
Kirandeep Kaur
Surinder Kaur
Subhadra Pradhan
Rosalind Lalchhanhimi Ralte
Rani Rampal
Poonam Rani
Rani Ritu
Thokchom Chanchan Devi
Binita Toppo

Preliminary

Team	Pld	W	D	L	GF	GA	GD	Pts
China	6	5	1	0	31	4	+27	16
South Korea	6	5	1	0	24	5	+19	16
Japan	6	4	0	2	21	7	+14	12
India	6	3	0	3	24	6	+18	9
Malaysia	6	2	0	4	12	18	−6	6
Thailand	6	1	0	5	5	44	−39	3
Kazakhstan	6	0	0	6	3	36	−33	0

November 13
19:30

India	4 – 0	Malaysia
T. Devi 26'; Thakur 43'; Rampal 53'; S. Kaur 67'	Report

Aoti Hockey Field 1, Guangzhou
Umpires:
Miao Lin (CHN)
Lesley Nunn (RSA)

November 16
13:00

Japan	3 – 0	India
Nakagawa 10'; Chiba 31'; Arai 69'	Report

Aoti Hockey Field 1, Guangzhou
Umpires:
Christiane Hippler (GER)
Miao Lin (CHN)

November 17
14:30

South Korea	1 – 0	India
Kim Jong-Hee 8'	Report

Aoti Hockey Field 2, Guangzhou
Umpires:
Mercedes Sánchez (ARG)
Chen Hong (CHN)

November 19
13:00

India	13 – 0	Thailand
T. Devi 12'; Karim 15'; Rampal 20', 42', 66'; Pradhan 24', 57'; S. Kaur 28', 31', 60', 63'; P. Rani 34'; J. Kaur 65'	Report

Aoti Hockey Field 1, Guangzhou
Umpires:
Lynn Hassan (SIN)
Lesley Nunn (RSA)

November 20
18:00

India	6 – 0	Kazakhstan
R. Devi 24', 44', 70'; Handa 40'; S. Kaur 54'; Karim 66'	Report

Aoti Hockey Field 1, Guangzhou
Umpires:
Chen Hong (CHN)
Miskarmalia Mohd Ariffin (SIN)

November 22
19:30

China	2 – 1	India
Wang Zhishuang 27'; Xu Xiaoxu 30'	Report	S. Kaur 65'

Aoti Hockey Field 1, Guangzhou
Umpires:
Kang Hyun-Young (KOR)
Lesley Nunn (RSA)

Bronze medal game

November 24
14:00

Japan	1 – 0 (a.e.t.)	India
Manabe 78'	Report

Aoti Hockey Field 1, Guangzhou
Umpires:
Miao Lin (CHN)
Kang Hyun-Young (KOR)

== Judo ==
=== Men ===
Athlete	Event	Preliminary	Round of 16	Quarterfinals	Final of table	Final
Athlete	Event	Opposition Result	Opposition Result	Opposition Result	Opposition Result	Opposition Result
Navjot Chana	-60 kg	Yu Kin Ting (HKG); W 120-000	Mohsen Ghaffar (IRI); W 110-000	Rishod Sobirov (UZB); L 000-120	Final of repechage match: A Lamusi (CHN); L 002-101	Did not advance
Sanju Irom	-66 kg	Tarek Saad (SYR); L 000-010	Did not advance			
Ramashrey Yadav	-73 kg	Mohammad Mohammad (KUW); W 120-000	Yassir Ayad (KSA); W 100-000	Wang Ki-Chun (KOR); L 000-111	Final of repechage match: Guvanch Nurmuhammedov (TKM); L 001-100	Did not advance
Sahil Pathania	-90 kg	BYE	Timur Bolat (KAZ); L 000-100	Did not advance		

=== Women ===
Athlete	Event	Preliminary	Round of 16	Quarterfinals	Final of table	Final
Athlete	Event	Opposition Result	Opposition Result	Opposition Result	Opposition Result	Opposition Result
Khumujam Tombi Devi	-48 kg		Nancy Quillotes (PHI); W 100-000	Chung Jung-Yeon (KOR); L 000-110	Final of repechage match: Alexandra Podryadova (KAZ); L 000-001	Did not advance
Kalpana Devi Thoudam	-52 kg		Sureerat Sadmaroeng (THA); L 011-100	Did not advance		
Anita Chanu	-57 kg	BYE	Alina Ten (KAZ); L 000-100	Did not advance		
Garima Chaudhary	-63 kg		Yasmeen Al-Salem (KUW); W 100-000	Yoshie Ueno (JPN); L 000-100	Final of repechage match: Selengegiin Enkhzaya (MGL); L 000-100	Did not advance

== Kabaddi ==
=== Men ===
Team

Manjeet Chhillar
Gautam Navneet
Nitin Govardhan Ghule
Jasmer
Kaptan Singh
Anup Kumar
Rakesh Kumar
Sonu Narwal
Samarjeet
Jeeva Kumar
Jagdeep Singh
Jasmer Singh

Preliminary round

Group A

Pos	Team	Pld	W	D	L	PF	PA	PD	Pts	Qualification
1	India	2	2	0	0	77	43	+34	4	Semifinals
2	Iran	2	1	0	1	79	60	+19	2	Semifinals
3	South Korea	2	0	0	2	39	92	−53	0	

Source: Results

November 23; 9:00	India	40 – 24	Iran	Nansha Gymnasium, Guangzhou
November 23; 9:00		(29–13)		Nansha Gymnasium, Guangzhou

November 24; 15:00	India	37 – 19	South Korea	Nansha Gymnasium, Guangzhou
November 24; 15:00		(19–10)		Nansha Gymnasium, Guangzhou

Semifinals

November 25; 10:00	India	52 – 17	Japan	Nansha Gymnasium, Guangzhou
November 25; 10:00		(26–5)		Nansha Gymnasium, Guangzhou

Final

November 26; 17:00	Iran	20 – 37	India	Nansha Gymnasium, Guangzhou
November 26; 17:00		(3–24)		Nansha Gymnasium, Guangzhou

=== Women ===
Team

Deepika Henry Joseph
Sanahanbi Devi
Kavita
Smita Kumari
Mamatha Poojary
Manisha
Kalyani Marella
Snehal Sampat Salunkhe
Kavitha Selvaraj
Pooja Sharma
V Tejeswini Bai
Sharmi Ulahannan

Preliminary round

Group B

Pos	Team	Pld	W	D	L	PF	PA	PD	Pts	Qualification
1	India	3	3	0	0	81	41	+40	6	Semifinals
2	Bangladesh	3	2	0	1	48	53	−5	4	Semifinals
3	South Korea	3	1	0	2	40	75	−35	2	
4	Nepal	3	0	0	3	0	0	0	0	

Source: Results

November 22; 10:40	India	34 – 20	Bangladesh	Nansha Gymnasium, Guangzhou
November 22; 10:40		(22–7)		Nansha Gymnasium, Guangzhou

November 23; 16:40	India	Walkover	Nepal	Nansha Gymnasium, Guangzhou
November 23; 16:40		(Nepal didn't show up)		Nansha Gymnasium, Guangzhou

November 24; 11:30	India	47 – 21	South Korea	Nansha Gymnasium, Guangzhou
November 24; 11:30		(20–11)		Nansha Gymnasium, Guangzhou

Semifinals

November 25; 15:50	India	23 – 22 (5R)	Iran	Nansha Gymnasium, Guangzhou
November 25; 15:50		(8–11, 17–17)		Nansha Gymnasium, Guangzhou

Final

November 26; 15:00	Thailand	14 – 28	India	Nansha Gymnasium, Guangzhou
November 26; 15:00		(7–17)		Nansha Gymnasium, Guangzhou

== Karate ==
=== Men ===
Athlete	Event	1/16 Finals	1/8 Finals	Quarterfinals	Semifinals	Finals
Athlete	Event	Opposition Result	Opposition Result	Opposition Result	Opposition Result	Opposition Result
Vikash Sharma	Individual Kata		Mukhammadzaid Iminov (UZB); L 0-5	Did not advance		
Gaurav Sindhiya	Kumite -60kg	BYE	Amir Mehdizadeh (IRI); L 1-5	Did not advance		
Gunasekaran Sabari Karthik	Kumite -67kg	Woraphol Kueapol (THA); L 0-3	Did not advance			
Vikash Sharma	Kumite -75kg	BYE	Yermek Ainazarov (KAZ); L 2-5	Did not advance		
Sunil Rathi	Kumite -84kg	BYE	Xu Xiangwu (CHN); L 1-6	Did not advance		

=== Women ===
Athlete	Event	1/8 Finals	Quarterfinals	Semifinals	Finals
Athlete	Event	Opposition Result	Opposition Result	Opposition Result	Opposition Result
Valena Valentina	Individual Kata	Cheung Pui Si (MAC); L 0-5	Did not advance		
Valena Valentina	Kumite -50kg	Cholpon Shaidieva (KGZ); W 6-0	Chansouda Phetsiriseng (LAO); W 5-2	Li Hong (CHN); L 2-4	Bronze medal match: Yanisa Torrattanawathana (THA); L WO
Syiem Linza Fenny	Kumite -55kg	Roji Nagarkoti (NEP); W 3-2	Lao Un Ieng (MAC); L Hantei	Did not advance	
Sumithra Sekar	Kumite -61kg	Zuhriia Mshenesh (PLE); L 0-4	Did not advance		
Simmi Batta	Kumite -68kg	BYE	Liu Ya-li (TPE); L 0-3	Did not advance	

== Roller Sports ==
=== Men ===
Athlete	Event	Qualification		Final	
Athlete	Event	Result	Rank	Result	Rank
Prateek Raja	Men's 300 m time trial			26.460	8th
Brahmateja Sathi	Men's 300 m time trial			28.683	10th
Prateek Raja	Men's 500 m sprint race	43.909	3rd	Did not advance	
Akash Aradhya	Men's 500 m sprint race	43.402	4th	Did not advance	
Brahmateja Sathi	Men's 10,000 m Points + Elimination			EL	7th
Ingale Vikram Rajendra	Men's 10,000 m Points + Elimination			EL	9th

=== Women ===
Athlete	Event	Qualification		Final	
Athlete	Event	Result	Rank	Result	Rank
Varsha Srirama Puranik	Women's 300 m time trial			29.765	7th
Bhalla Kanika Manjitsingh	Women's 300 m time trial			30.250	8th
Srishty Srishty	Women's 500 m sprint race	48.085	5th	Did not advance	
Varsha Srirama Puranik	Women's 500 m sprint race	48.617	4th	Did not advance	
Bhalla Kanika Manjitsingh	Women's 10,000 m Points + Elimination			EL	9th
Hasthanthar Anand Pragna	Women's 10,000 m Points + Elimination			EL	10th

=== Artistic ===
Athlete	Event	Short program		Long program		Total	
Athlete	Event	Result	Rank	Result	Rank	Result	Rank
Anup Kumar Yama	Men's Free skating	81.6	3rd	244.2	3rd	325.8	3rd place, bronze medalist(s)
Akhil Chitikela	Men's Free skating	74.1	7th	222.0	7th	296.1	7th
Aashna Rajan Shah	Women's Free skating	67.1	5th	210.6	5th	277.7	5th
Avani Panchal	Women's Free skating	66.6	6th	207.3	6th	273.9	6th
Avani Panchal; Anup Kumar Yama	Pairs's Free skating	73.0	3rd	244.2	3rd	325.8	3rd place, bronze medalist(s)

== Rowing ==
Men

Athlete	Event	Heats		Repechage		Final	
Athlete	Event	Time	Rank	Time	Rank	Time	Rank
Bajrang Lal Takhar	Single sculls	7:02.45	1st F	auto advancement		7:04.78	1st place, gold medalist(s)
Anil Kumar Mehrolia; Devender Kumar Khandwal	Double sculls	6:39.89	5th F	auto advancement		6:49.34	6th
Jenil Krishnan; Anil Kumar; Ranjit Singh; Saji Thomas	Coxless four	6:11.89	2nd F	auto advancement		6:16.79	2nd place, silver medalist(s)
Satish Joshi; Jenil Krishnan; Anil Kumar; Lokesh Kumar; Girraj Singh; Manjeet Singh; Ranjit Singh; Saji Thomas; Rajesh Kumar Yadav	Eight	5:52.56	2nd F	auto advancement		5:49.50	2nd place, silver medalist(s)
Sandeep Kumar; Shokender Tomar	Lightweight double sculls	6:40.00	2nd R	6:35.55	1st F	6:42.23	5th
Satish Joshi; Lokesh Kumar; Manjeet Singh; Rajesh Kumar Yadav	Lightweight coxless four	6:16.97	2nd F	auto advancement		6:13.32	2nd place, silver medalist(s)

Women

Athlete	Event	Heats		Repechage		Final	
Athlete	Event	Time	Rank	Time	Rank	Time	Rank
Pratima Puhan; Pramila Prava Minz	Coxless pair	7:52.39	3rd F	auto advancement		7:47.50	3rd place, bronze medalist(s)
Shruti Satish Kamath; Monalisa Chanu Khumanthem; Tababi Devi Ngangom; Rameshwori Devi Oinam	Coxless four	7:09.91	5th F	auto advancement		7:08.85	5th
Priya Devi Changamayum; Thara Kurian; Amusana Devi Moirangthem; Dittymol Varghese	Lightweight quadruple sculls	7:06.29	5th F	auto advancement		6:57.73	4th

== Rugby ==
=== Men ===
Team

Deepak Dagar
Gautam Dagar
Nasser Hussain
Bikash Jena
Puneeth Krishnamurthy
Amit Lochab
Thimmaiah Madanda
Hrishikesh Pendse
Pritom Roy
Rohaan Sethna
Surinder Singh
Kayrus Unwala

Preliminary round

Pool B

Pos	Team	Pld	W	D	L	PF	PA	PD	Pts	Qualification
1	China	3	3	0	0	99	10	+89	9	Quarterfinals
2	South Korea	3	2	0	1	91	17	+74	7	Quarterfinals
3	Sri Lanka	3	1	0	2	47	81	−34	5	Quarterfinals
4	India	3	0	0	3	17	146	−129	3	Quarterfinals

Source: Results

November 21
17:03

South Korea	43 – 5	India
Try: Kim W.Y. (2) 1' c, 6' m Kim H.S. (2) 7' m, 9' c Chun J.M. 11' c Kwak C.W. 13' m Park W.Y. 14' c Con: Kim W.Y. (3/5); Chun J.M. (1/1)		Try: Hussain 4' m

University City Stadium, Guangzhou
Referee: Liu Hao (China)

November 22
11:23

China	61 – 0	India
Try: Zhang Z.Q. 1' c Li Y. (2) 3' c, 5' c Lu Z. (4) 6' c, 8' c, 10' c, 14' c Li J.L. 7' c Sun T. 13' m Con: Zhang Z.Q. (2/2); Li Y. (1/1); Lu Z. (4/4); Jin Y. (1/1)

University City Stadium, Guangzhou
Referee: Gabriel Lee (Hong Kong)

November 22
14:09

Sri Lanka	42 – 12	India
Try: Wilwara (2) 2' c, 3' c Sooriyabandara (2) 6' c, 10' c Handapangoda 9' c Dias 12' c Con: Hettiarachchi (4/4); Handapangoda (1/1); Sooriyabandara (1/1)		Try: Pendse 7' m G. Dagar 7' c Con: Sethna (1/2)

University City Stadium, Guangzhou
Referee: Harry Mason (Singapore)

Final round

Quarterfinals

November 23
10:37

Japan	26 – 5	India
Try: Kitagawa 3' m Imamura (2) 10' c, 12' c Narita 14' c Con: Kitagawa (3/3)		Try: Pendse 7' m

University City Stadium, Guangzhou
Referee: Harry Mason (Singapore)

5–8 placing

November 23
13:46

India	5 – 38	Malaysia
Try: G. Dagar 14' m		Try: Krishnan 4' c Azhar 7' c Nasrudin (2) 7' c, 14' m Hafifi 9' c Hafis 11' m Con: Nasrudin (4/5)

University City Stadium, Guangzhou
Referee: Azhar Yusof (Singapore)

7th/8th placing

November 23
16:09

India	22 – 7	Thailand
Try: G. Dagar 4' m Unwala (2) 7' c, 14' m Hussain 10' m Con: Sethna (1/4)		Try: Wongsalangkarn 6' c Con: Khamkoet (1/1)

University City Stadium, Guangzhou
Referee: Akihisa Aso (Japan)

=== Women ===
Team

Niharika Bal
Bhagyalaxmi Barik
V Boman Bharucha
Annapurna Bothate
Kalpana Das
Sutapa Das
Surabhi Date
Sitara Indramohan
Yogita Marathe
Sheetal Maurya
Tapasi Nandi
Neha Pardeshi

Preliminary round

Pool B

Pos	Team	Pld	W	D	L	PF	PA	PD	Pts	Qualification
1	Kazakhstan	3	3	0	0	100	7	+93	9	Quarterfinals
2	Japan	3	2	0	1	62	33	+29	7	Quarterfinals
3	Singapore	3	1	0	2	34	53	−19	5	Quarterfinals
4	India	3	0	0	3	5	108	−103	3	Quarterfinals

Source: Results

November 21
16:12

Kazakhstan	50 – 0	India
Try: Sherer (2) 2' m, 4' c Teryayeva (2) 6' c, 12' c Sazonova (3) 8' m, 10' c, 13' c Balashova 14' m Con: Radzivil (5/7)

University City Stadium, Guangzhou
Referee: Chou Wen-liang (Chinese Taipei)

November 22
10:09

Japan	36 – 0	India
Try: Yamaguchi 1' m Yokoyama 7' c Fujisaki (2) 8' m, 11' c Kato 14' m Kawano 14' c Con: Yokoyama (3/6)

University City Stadium, Guangzhou
Referee: Azhar Yusof (Singapore)

November 22
13:23

Singapore	22 – 5	India
Try: Teo M.L. 1' m Wong Y.L. 2' c Gollifer 6' m Fong S.Y. 12' m Con: Wong Y.L. (1/4)		Try: K. Das 14' m

University City Stadium, Guangzhou
Referee: Akihisa Aso (Japan)

Final round

Quarterfinals

November 23
9:00

China	42 – 0	India
Try: Guan Q.S. (2) 2' m, 8' m Bai Y. (2) 3' m, 13' m Liu T.T. 5' m Wang Q.L. 10' m Fan W.J. (2) 11' c, 14' m Con: Fan W.J. (1/1)

University City Stadium, Guangzhou
Referee: Anthony Lothian (Hong Kong)

5–8 placing

November 23
12:09

India	0 – 46	Japan
		Try: Mitsugi (3) 2' m, 6' c, 14' c Okada 4' m Yamaguchi (2) 7' m, 9' m Tanaka (2) 12' m, 14' c< Con: A. Suzuki (1/3); Yokoyama (2/5)

University City Stadium, Guangzhou
Referee: Anastassiya Khamova (Kazakhstan)

7th/8th placing

November 23
15:18

India	21 – 10	South Korea
Try: Pardeshi 7' c Maurya 9' c Nandi 14' c Con: Date (2/2); Bharucha (1/1)		Try: Min K.J. 5' m Park S.Y. 14' m

University City Stadium, Guangzhou
Referee: Abdul Rashid Aziz (Singapore)

== Sailing ==
=== Men ===
Athlete	Event	Race												Net points	Final rank
Athlete	Event	1	2	3	4	5	6	7	8	9	10	11	12	Net points	Final rank
Kelapanda Chengappa Ganapathy	Men's Dinghy Optimist	(9)	5	6	6	9	7	6	4	8	6	6	4	67	6th

=== Women ===
Athlete	Event	Race												Net points	Final rank
Athlete	Event	1	2	3	4	5	6	7	8	9	10	11	12	Net points	Final rank
Zephra Currimbhoy	Women's Dinghy Optimist	2	(8)	6	5	5	7	6	5	6	7	5	6	60	6th

=== Open ===
Athlete	Event	Race												Net points	Final rank
Athlete	Event	1	2	3	4	5	6	7	8	9	10	11	12	Net points	Final rank
Rajesh Kumar Choudhary	Open Laser Radial	7	7	7	7	2	6	(10)	7	8	1	7	9	68	8th

Athlete	Event	Opposition	Opposition	Opposition	Opposition	Opposition	Opposition	Opposition	Total points	Rank	Semifinal	Final	Final rank
Athlete	Event	1st + 2nd Race Points	1st + 2nd Race Points	1st + 2nd Race Points	1st + 2nd Race Points	1st + 2nd Race Points	1st + 2nd Race Points	1st + 2nd Race Points	Total points	Rank	Races Points	Races Points	Final rank
Balraj Balraj; Trunal Balkrishna Helegaonkar; Atool Sinha; Farokh Faramroze Tarapore; Shekhar Singh Yadav	Open Match Racing	Bahrain (BRN); 2-0	China (CHN); 1-1	Pakistan (PAK); 2-0	Japan (JPN); 1-1	South Korea (KOR); 0-2	Singapore (SIN); 1-1	Malaysia (MAS); 2-0	9	3rd	China (CHN); W 3-2	Japan (JPN); L 0-3	2nd place, silver medalist(s)

== Sepak takraw ==
=== Men's double regu ===
Team

Niken Singh Khangembam
Gopen Singh Taiyenjam
Ingoba Singh Thongam

Preliminary

Group B

Pos	Team	Pld	W	L	SF	SA	SD	Pts	Qualification
1	Indonesia	3	3	0	6	0	+6	6	Semifinals
2	Japan	3	2	1	4	3	+1	4	Semifinals
3	China	3	1	2	2	5	−3	2	
4	India	3	0	3	2	6	−4	0	

Source: Results

Date		Score		Set 1	Set 2	Set 3
25 Nov	Japan	2–1	India	21–17	20–22	15–13
25 Nov	Indonesia	2–0	India	21–12	21–16	
26 Nov	India	1–2	China	21–17	24–25	10–15

=== Men's team ===
Team

Sanathoi Singh Akoijam
Biken Singh Chabugbam
Kiran Kumar Singh Hirom
Gurumayum Jiteshor Sharma
Niken Singh Khangembam
Viseyie Koso
Lalhlimpuia
Nanao Singh Moirangthem
Sandeep Kumar
Gopen Singh Taiyenjam
Dharmendra Singh Thokchom
Ingoba Singh Thongam

Preliminary

Group B

Pos	Team	Pld	W	L	MF	MA	MD	Pts	Qualification
1	Malaysia	3	3	0	8	1	+7	6	Semifinals
2	Japan	3	2	1	5	4	+1	4	Semifinals
3	China	3	1	2	3	6	−3	2	
4	India	3	0	3	2	7	−5	0	

Source: Results

Date		Score		Regu 1	Regu 2	Regu 3
16 Nov	India	1–2	Japan	2–0	0–2	0–2
17 Nov	China	2–1	India	2–1	0–2	2–0
18 Nov	Malaysia	3–0	India	2–0	2–0	2–0

=== Women's double regu ===
Team

Ronita Devi Elangbam
Aruna Devi Mutum
Jimi Devi Okram

Preliminary

Group A

Pos	Team	Pld	W	L	SF	SA	SD	Pts	Qualification
1	Myanmar	2	2	0	4	1	+3	4	Semifinals
2	China	2	1	1	3	2	+1	2	Semifinals
3	India	2	0	2	0	4	−4	0	

Source: Results

Date		Score		Set 1	Set 2	Set 3
25 Nov	India	0–2	China	7–21	12–21	
26 Nov	Myanmar	2–0	India	21–12	21–9	

=== Women's team ===
Team

Rebika Akoijam
Maipak Devi Ayekpam
Deepa
Binalatam Devi Eelangbam
Rasheshwa Devi Elangbam
Ronita Devi Elangbam
Robita Devi Khangembam
Aruna Devi Mutum
Jimi Devi Okram
Amrita Pande
Sameena Begum
Milana Devi Waikhom

Preliminary

Group B

Pos	Team	Pld	W	L	MF	MA	MD	Pts	Qualification
1	Thailand	3	3	0	9	0	+9	6	Semifinals
2	China	3	2	1	6	3	+3	4	Semifinals
3	South Korea	3	1	2	3	6	−3	2	
4	India	3	0	3	0	9	−9	0	

Source: Results

Date		Score		Regu 1	Regu 2	Regu 3
16 Nov	India	0–3	South Korea	0–2	0–2	0–2
17 Nov	China	3–0	India	2–0	2–0	2–0
18 Nov	Thailand	3–0	India	2–0	2–0	2–0

== Shooting ==
Men

Event	Athlete	Qualification		Final	
Event	Athlete	Score	Rank	Score	Rank
Men's 10 m air pistol	Vijay Kumar	579-18x	8th	680.4	3rd place, bronze medalist(s)
Men's 10 m air pistol	Gurpreet Singh	573-15x	20th	Did not advance	
Men's 10 m air pistol	Omkar Singh	568-14x	28th	Did not advance	
Men's 10 m air pistol team	Vijay Kumar; Gurpreet Singh; Omkar Singh			1720-47x	4th
Men's 10 m air rifle	Gagan Narang	597-47x	2nd	700.7	2nd place, silver medalist(s)
Men's 10 m air rifle	Sanjeev Rajput	593-48x QS-Off 51.8	9th	Did not advance	
Men's 10 m air rifle	Abhinav Bindra	593-47x QS-Off 50.6	10th	Did not advance	
Men's 10 m air rifle team	Gagan Narang; Sanjeev Rajput; Abhinav Bindra			1783-142x	2nd place, silver medalist(s)
Men's 25 m standard pistol	Samaresh Jung			569-13x	7th
Men's 25 m standard pistol	Pemba Tamang			550- 8x	22nd
Men's 25 m standard pistol	Chandrashekhar Chaudhary			549-10x	23rd
Men's 25 m standard pistol team	Samaresh Jung; Pemba Tamang; Chandrashekhar Chaudhary			1668-31x	4th
Men's 25 m rapid fire pistol	Rahul Panwar	572-16x	10th	Did not advance	
Men's 25 m rapid fire pistol	Gurpreet Singh	571-26x	11th	Did not advance	
Men's 25 m rapid fire pistol	Vijay Kumar	568-22x	17th	Did not advance	
Men's 25 m rapid fire pistol team	Rahul Panwar; Gurpreet Singh; Vijay Kumar			1711-64x	4th
Men's 25 m center fire pistol	Vijay Kumar			583-17x	3rd place, bronze medalist(s)
Men's 25 m center fire pistol	Omkar Singh			580-17x	8th
Men's 25 m center fire pistol	Harpreet Singh			563-18x	32nd
Men's 25 m center fire pistol team	Vijay Kumar; Omkar Singh; Harpreet Singh			1726-52x	5th
Men's 50 m pistol	Omkar Singh	557-12x	5th Q	648.2	7th
Men's 50 m pistol	Amanpreet Singh	550- 9x	16th	Did not advance	
Men's 50 m pistol	Deepak Sharma	539- 8x	28th	Did not advance	
Men's 50 m pistol team	Omkar Singh; Amanpreet Singh; Deepak Sharma			1646-29x	5th
Men's 50 m rifle prone	Hariom Singh	590-32x	13th	Did not advance	
Men's 50 m rifle prone	Gagan Narang	587-28x	24th	Did not advance	
Men's 50 m rifle prone	Surendra Singh Rathod	586-33x	27th	Did not advance	
Men's 50 m rifle prone team	Hariom Singh; Gagan Narang; Surendra Singh Rathod			1763-93x	5th
Men's 50 m rifle three positions	Gagan Narang	1162-49x	4th	1261.8	4th
Men's 50 m rifle three positions	Imran Hassan Khan	1150-41x	13th	Did not advance	
Men's 50 m rifle three positions	Sanjeev Rajput	1146-43x	12th	Did not advance	
Men's 50 m rifle three positions team	Gagan Narang; Imran Hassan Khan; Sanjeev Rajput			3458-133x	4th
Men's Trap	Manavjit Singh Sandhu	119	3rd	136^{+0}	5th
Men's Trap	Mansher Singh	113	17th	Did not advance	
Men's Trap	Zorawar Singh Sandhu	109	28th	Did not advance	
Men's Trap team	Manavjit Singh Sandhu; Mansher Singh; Zorawar Singh Sandhu			341	3rd place, bronze medalist(s)
Men's Double Trap	Ronjan Sodhi	139	2nd	186	1st place, gold medalist(s)
Men's Double Trap	Asher Noria	134	11th	Did not advance	
Men's Double Trap	Vikram Bhatnagar	130	16th	Did not advance	
Men's Double Trap team	Ronjan Sodhi; Asher Noria; Vikram Bhatnagar			403	3rd place, bronze medalist(s)
Men's Skeet	Mairaj Ahmad Khan	113	13th	Did not advance	
Men's Skeet	Allan Daniel Peoples	112	20th	Did not advance	
Men's Skeet	Smit Singh	111	22nd	Did not advance	
Men's Skeet team	Mairaj Ahmad Khan; Allan Daniel Peoples; Smit Singh			336	7th

Women

Event	Athlete	Qualification		Final	
Event	Athlete	Score	Rank	Score	Rank
Women's 10 m air pistol	Heena Sidhu	381- 9x QS-Off 49.6	9th	Did not advance	
Women's 10 m air pistol	Annu Raj Singh	380-10x	11th	Did not advance	
Women's 10 m air pistol	Sonia Rai	379- 4x	16th	Did not advance	
Women's 10 m air pistol team	Heena Sidhu; Annu Raj Singh; Sonia Rai			1140-23x	2nd place, silver medalist(s)
Women's 10 m air rifle	Suma Siddharth Shirur	396-33x	10th	Did not advance	
Women's 10 m air rifle	Kavita Yadav	390-27x	28th	Did not advance	
Women's 10 m air rifle	Tejaswini Sawant	390-24x	33rd	Did not advance	
Women's 10 m air rifle team	Suma Siddharth Shirur; Kavita Yadav; Tejaswini Sawant			1176-84x	7th
Women's 25 m pistol	Rahi Sarnobot	577-13x	10th	Did not advance	
Women's 25 m pistol	Annu Raj Singh	574-13x	18th	Did not advance	
Women's 25 m pistol	Anisa Sayyed	566-16x	26th	Did not advance	
Women's 25 m pistol team	Rahi Sarnobot; Annu Raj Singh; Anisa Sayyed			1717-42x	7th
Women's 50 m rifle prone	Tejaswini Sawant			588-30x	11th
Women's 50 m rifle prone	Meena Kumari			586-26x	14th
Women's 50 m rifle prone	Lajja Gauswami			585-32x	16th
Women's 50 m rifle prone team	Tejaswini Sawant; Meena Kumari; Lajja Gauswami			1759-88x	4th
Women's 50 m rifle three positions	Tejaswini Sawant	569-19x	23rd	Did not advance	
Women's 50 m rifle three positions	Lajja Gauswami	569-13x	24th	Did not advance	
Women's 50 m rifle three positions	Chetanpreet Nilon	559-15x	31st	Did not advance	
Women's 50 m rifle three positions team	Tejaswini Sawant; Lajja Gauswami; Chetanpreet Nilon			1697-67x	9th
Women's Trap	Shagun Chowdhary	64	8th	Did not advance	
Women's Trap	Seema Tomar	61	13th	Did not advance	
Women's Trap	Shreyasi Singh	56	21st	Did not advance	
Women's Trap team	Shagun Chowdhary; Seema Tomar; Shreyasi Singh			181	4th
Women's Skeet	Arti Singh Rao	65^{+1}	8th	Did not advance	

== Soft Tennis ==
Athlete	Event	Round Group				1st Round	Quarterfinals	Semifinals	Final
Athlete	Event	Match 1	Match 2	Match 3	Match 4	1st Round	Quarterfinals	Semifinals	Final
Athlete	Event	Opposition Result	Opposition Result	Opposition Result	Opposition Result	Opposition Result	Opposition Result	Opposition Result	Opposition Result
Navneet Kumar	Men's Singles	Manoj Subba (NEP); L 1-4 (1-4, 3-5, 4-0, 3-5, 2-4)	Lee Yo-Han (KOR); L 0-4 (3-5, 2-4, 2-4, 3-5)	Ananda Khamphoumy (LAO); W 4-1 (4-2, 4-1, 4-1, 2-4, 4-1)		Did not advance			
Jitender Singh Mehlda	Men's Singles	Shi Bo (CHN); L 0-4 (2-4, 3-5, 0-4, 0-4)	Kuo Chia-wei (TPE); L 1-4 (4-1, 4-6, 1-4, 0-4, 1-4)	Rahmatullojon Rajabaliev (TJK); W 4-0 (6-4, 4-1, 4-2, 4-1)		Did not advance			
Navneet Kumar; Atul Sri Patel	Men's Doubles	Sohan Dhaubhadel (NEP) and Sanjay Nepal (NEP); W 5-1 (4-2, 1-4, 4-2, 4-1, 6-4, 6-4)	Li Chia-hung (TPE) and Yang Sheng-fa (TPE); L 0-5 (0-4, 1-4, 0-4, 0-4, 2-4)			Jiao Yang (CHN) and Shi Bo (CHN); L 0-5 (2-4, 3-5, 5-7, 0-4, 3-5)	Did not advance		
Jitender Singh Mehlda; Nasir Mohammed	Men's Doubles	Gantulga Enkhtuvshin (MGL) and Radnaabazaryn Bayartogtokh (MGL); L 4-5 (4-2, 2-4, 5-7, 4-6, 4-2, 4-0, 5-3, 0-4, 8-10)	Lin Ting-chun (TPE) and Liu Chia-lun (TPE); L 0-5 (3-5, 2-4, 0-4, 1-4, 0-4)			Did not advance			
Navneet Kumar; Atul Sri Patel; Jitender Singh Mehlda; Nasir Mohammed	Women's Team	Philippines (PHI); L 0-3 (1-5, 1-4, 0-5)	Chinese Taipei (TPE); L 0-3 (0-5, 1-4, 0-5)	South Korea (KOR); L 0-3 (0-5, 0-4, 0-5)	Nepal (NEP); W 2-1 (5-0, 4-2, 0-5)			Did not advance	
Samia Rizvi	Women's Singles	Jo Yong-Sim (PRK); L 0-4 (4-6, 1-4, 3-5, 0-4)	Kim Ae-Kyung (KOR); L 1-4 (3-5, 1-4, 4-2, 0-4, 2-4)	Shabnam Yusupzhanova (TJK); W WO		Did not advance			
Taruka Srivastav	Women's Singles	Ayaka Oba (JPN); L 0-4 (0-4, 2-4, 1-4, 2-4)	Gao Tong (CHN); L 0-4 (1-4, 1-4, 1-4, 0-4)	Dash Tsetsenbayar (MGL); L 3-4 (7-5, 5-3, 4-1, 1-4, 1-4, 2-4, 4-7)		Did not advance			
Priyanka Bugade; Samia Rizvi	Women's Doubles	Ayaka Oba (JPN) and Mai Sasaki (JPN); L 0-5 (1-4, 0-4, 0-4, 1-4, 0-4)	Xin Yani (CHN) and Zhao Lei (CHN); L 1-5 (0-4, 4-2, 0-4, 1-4, 0-4, 2-4)	Bulgan Norovsuren (MGL) and Dagiidamba Naranjargal (MGL); L 3-5 (4-2, 0-4, 6-4, 2-4, 4-6, 4-0, 2-4, 2-4)			Did not advance		
Monica Menon; Taruka Srivastav	Women's Doubles	Joo Og (KOR) and Kim Ae-Kyung (KOR); L 0-5 (1-4, 0-4, 0-4, 1-4, 1-4)	Gao Tong (CHN) and Qiu Sisi (CHN); L 0-5 (0-4, 1-4, 0-4, 0-4, 1-4)	Boldyn Namuudari (MGL) and Sugariin Gancnimeg (MGL); W 5-0 (4-2, 4-2, 4-2, 5-3, 5-3)			Did not advance		
Monica Menon; Taruka Srivastav; Priyanka Bugade; Samia Rizvi	Women's Team	South Korea (KOR); L 0-3 (0-5, 0-4, 0-5)	China (CHN); L 0-3 (1-5, 0-4, 0-5)	Mongolia (MGL); L 1-2 (5-3, 2-4, 0-5)				Did not advance	
Nasir Mohammed; Taruka Srivastav	Mixed Doubles					Jiao Yang (CHN) and Qiu Sisi (CHN); L 1-5 (4-6, 2-4, 0-4, 4-2, 3-5, 1-4)	Did not advance		
Jitender Singh Mehlda; Monica Menon	Mixed Doubles					Hidenori Shinohara (JPN) and Mai Sasaki (JPN); L 0-5 (3-5, 0-4, 3-5, 1-4, 1-4)	Did not advance		

== Squash ==
Athlete	Event	1st Round	2nd Round	Quarterfinals	Semifinals	Final
Athlete	Event	Opposition Result	Opposition Result	Opposition Result	Opposition Result	Opposition Result
Siddharth Suchde	Men's singles	BYE	Dick Lau (HKG); W 3-1 (9-11, 11-4, 11-6, 11-4)	Saurav Ghosal (IND); L 0-3 (6-11, 6-11, 7-11)	Did not advance	
Saurav Ghosal	Men's singles	BYE	Ammar Al-Temimi (KUW); W 3-0 (11-4, 11-4, 11-5)	Siddharth Suchde (IND); W 3-0 (11-6, 11-6, 11-7)	Mohd Azlan Iskandar (MAS); L 1-3 (5-11, 11-6, 5-11, 10-12) (bronze)	Did not advance
Dipika Pallikal	Women's singles		Gu Jinyue (CHN); W 3-0 (11-4, 12-10, 11-1)	Nicol David (MAS); L 1-3 (8-11, 11-7, 6-11, 4-11)	Did not advance	
Joshna Chinappa	Women's singles		Jemyca Aribado (PHI); W 3-0 (11-6, 11-7, 11-4)	Low Wee Wern (MAS); L 2-3 (11-7, 11-9, 8-11, 9-11, 3-11)	Did not advance	

Athlete	Event	Pool Summary					Semifinals	Final
Athlete	Event	Contest 1	Contest 2	Contest 3	Contest 4	Contest 5	Semifinals	Final
Athlete	Event	Opposition Result	Opposition Result	Opposition Result	Opposition Result	Opposition Result	Opposition Result	Opposition Result
Saurav Ghosal; Sandeep Jangra; Harinder Pal Sandhu; Siddharth Suchde	Men's Team	Qatar (QAT); W 3-0 (3-0, 3-0, 3-2)	Japan (JPN); W 3-0 (3-0, 3-0, 3-0)	Saudi Arabia (KSA); W 3-0 (3-0, 3-1, 3-0)	South Korea (KOR); W 3-0 (3-0, 3-0, 3-0)	Malaysia (MAS); L 1-2 (2-3, 3-1, 0-3)	Pakistan (PAK); L 0-2 (1-3, 1-3) (bronze)	Did not advance
Anaka Alankamony; Joshna Chinappa; Dipika Pallikal; Anwesha Reddy	Women's Team	China (CHN); W 3-0 (3-0, 3-0, 3-0)	Pakistan (PAK); W 3-0 (3-1, 3-0, 3-0)	Hong Kong (HKG); L 0-3 (1-3, 0-3, 1-3)			Malaysia (MAS); L 0-2 (0-3, 0-3) (bronze)	Did not advance

== Swimming ==
Men

Event	Athletes	Heat		Final	
Event	Athletes	Time	Rank	Time	Rank
50 m freestyle	Virdhawal Khade	22.98	5th Q	22.87	4th
50 m freestyle	Arjun Jayaprakash	23.74	26th	Did not advance	
100 m freestyle	Virdhawal Khade	51.25	13th	Did not advance	
100 m freestyle	Aaron Agnel Dsouza	52.71	23rd	Did not advance	
200 m freestyle	Aaron Agnel Dsouza	1:53.93	13th	Did not advance	
200 m freestyle	Rohit Rajendra Havaldar	1:55.48	20th	Did not advance	
400 m freestyle	Mandar Anandrao Divase	4:08.22	16th	Did not advance	
1500 m freestyle	Mandar Anandrao Divase			16:11.84	8th
50 m backstroke	Balak Melkote Badrinath	27.63	17th	Did not advance	
100 m backstroke	Rehan Jehangir Poncha	59.38	17th	Did not advance	
100 m backstroke	Balak Melkote Badrinath	59.62	19th	Did not advance	
200 m backstroke	Rohit Rajendra Havaldar	2:12.79	19th	Did not advance	
200 m backstroke	Rehan Jehangir Poncha	2:18.56	21st	Did not advance	
50 m breaststroke	Sandeep Sejwal	28.96	11th	Did not advance	
100 m breaststroke	Sandeep Sejwal	1:03.67	9th	Did not advance	
200 m breaststroke	Sandeep Sejwal	2:19.78	10th	Did not advance	
50 m butterfly	Virdhawal Khade	24.56	5th Q	24.31	3rd place, bronze medalist(s)
50 m butterfly	Anshul Kothari	26.08	21st	Did not advance	
100 m butterfly	Rehan Jehangir Poncha	57.09	19th	Did not advance	
100 m butterfly	Virdhawal Khade	58.21	26th	Did not advance	
200 m butterfly	Rehan Jehangir Poncha	2:03.96	9th	Did not advance	
200 m individual medley	Rehan Jehangir Poncha	2:08.55	15th	Did not advance	
4×100 m freestyle	Aaron Agnel Dsouza; Arjun Jayaprakash; Anshul Kothari; Virdhawal Khade	3:29.71	10th	Did not advance	
4×200 m freestyle	Aaron Agnel Dsouza; Mandar Anandrao Divase; Rohit Rajendra Havaldar; Rehan Jehangir Poncha	7:40.03	10th	Did not advance	
4×100 m medley	Rehan Jehangir Poncha; Sandeep Sejwal; Balak Melkote Badrinath; Aaron Agnel Dsouza; Virdhawal Khade*	3:49.38	8th Q	3:49.38	6th

* Participated in the heats only.

== Table Tennis ==
Athlete	Event	Round of 64	Round of 32	Round of 16	Quarterfinals	Semifinals	Final
Athlete	Event	Opposition Result	Opposition Result	Opposition Result	Opposition Result	Opposition Result	Opposition Result
Amalraj Anthony	Men's singles	BYE	Mohd Shakirin Ibrahim (MAS); W 4-2 (11-4, 7-11, 11-8, 13-11, 8-11, 11-8)	Chuang Chih-yuan (TPE); L 0-4 (6-11, 10-12, 5-11, 1-11)	Did not advance		
Sharath Kamal	Men's singles	BYE	Rohan Sirisena (SRI); W 4-0 (11-9, 11-7, 11-1, 11-8)	Oh Sang-Eun (KOR); L 1-4 (9-11, 4-11, 7-11, 12-10, 6-11)	Did not advance		
Amalraj Anthony; Soumyadeep Roy	Men's Doubles		Cheung Yuk (HKG) and Li Ching (HKG); L 0-3 (5-11, 5-11, 7-11)	Did not advance			
Sharath Kamal; Subhajit Saha	Men's Doubles		Husain Al-Bahrani (KUW) and Mansour Al-Enezi (KUW); W 3-0 (11-7, 11-4, 11-4)	Lee Jung-Woo (KOR) and Oh Sang-Eun (KOR); L 0-3 (9-11, 6-11, 4-11)	Did not advance		
Shamini Kumaresan	Women's singles	Surakhbayariin Misheel (MGL); W 4-0 (11-5, 11-1, 11-2, 11-4)	Sayaka Hirano (JPN); L 2-4 (7-11, 5-11, 11-7, 7-11, 11-7, 7-11)	Did not advance			
Madhurika Patkar	Women's singles	Mai Hoang My Trang (VIE); L 2-4 (11-3, 8-11, 9-11, 8-11, 11-5, 9-11)	Did not advance				
Mouma Das; Poulomi Ghatak	Women's Doubles		Li Jiawei (SIN) and Sun Beibei (SIN); L 0-3 (5-11, 5-11, 2-11)	Did not advance			
Shamini Kumaresan; Madhurika Patkar	Women's Doubles		Cheng I-ching (TPE) and Huang Yi-hua (TPE); L 2-3 (11-5, 3-11, 12-10, 4-11, 4-11)	Did not advance			
Amalraj Anthony; Madhurika Patkar	Mixed Doubles		Chuang Chih-yuan (TPE) and Huang Yi-hua (TPE); L 0-3 (8-11, 5-11, 4-11)	Did not advance			
Sharath Kamal; Shamini Kumaresan	Mixed Doubles		Dinh Quang Linh (VIE) and Luong Thi Tam (VIE); W 3-1 (11-3, 4-11, 14-12, 12-10)	Seiya Kishikawa (JPN) and Ai Fukuhara (JPN); L 2-3 (12-10, 4-11, 11-8, 2-11, 6-11)	Did not advance		

Athlete	Event	Pool Summary			Quarterfinals	Semifinals	Final
Athlete	Event	Contest 1	Contest 2	Contest 3	Quarterfinals	Semifinals	Final
Athlete	Event	Opposition Result	Opposition Result	Opposition Result	Opposition Result	Opposition Result	
Sharath Kamal; Amalraj Arputharaj; Soumyadeep Roy; Subhajit Saha; Sanil Shetty	Men's Team	Chinese Taipei (TPE); L 0-3 (0-3, 1-3, 2-3)	Vietnam (VIE); W 3-1 (3-1, 1-3, 3-1, 3-1)	Japan (JPN); L 1-3 (3-0, 0-3, 1-3, 1-3)	Did not advance		
Mouma Das; Poulomi Ghatak; Shamini Kumaresan; Madhurika Patkar; Mamata Prabhu	Women's Team	Laos (LAO); W 3-0 (3-0, 3-1, 3-0)	Singapore (SIN); L 0-3 (2-3, 1-3, 0-3)	Maldives (MDV); W 3-0 (3-0, 3-0, 3-0)	China (CHN); L 0-3 (0-3, 0-3, 0-3)	Did not advance	

== Taekwondo ==
=== Men ===
Athlete	Event	Round of 32	Round of 16	Quarterfinals	Semifinals	Final
Athlete	Event	Opposition Result	Opposition Result	Opposition Result	Opposition Result	Opposition Result
Sunil Kumar	Finweight (-54kg)	Lakpa Tashi Sherpa (BHU); W PTS 12-5	Abdulrahim Abdulhameed (BRN); L PTS 2-8	Did not advance		
Surendra Bhandari	Bantamweight (-63kg)	Darkhan Kassymkulov (KAZ); L PTS 7-8	Did not advance			
Chandan Lakra	Featherweight (-68kg)	Afifuddin Omar Sidek (MAS); W PTS 6-2	Naranchimegiin Erdenebaatar (MGL); L PTS 7-19	Did not advance		
Jasvant	Lightweight (-74kg)	Sawatvilay Phimmasone (LAO); W PTS 9-7	Yulius Fernando (INA); L PTS 5-6	Did not advance		
Anand Pandia Rajan	Welterweight (-80kg)	BYE	Eisa Al-Shammeri (KUW); W DSQ	Nabil Talal (JOR); L PTS 3-3	Did not advance	
Sandeep Kundu	Heavyweight (+87kg)		BYE	Akmal Irgashev (UZB); L PTS 4-18	Did not advance	

=== Women ===
Athlete	Event	Round of 32	Round of 16	Quarterfinals	Semifinals	Final
Athlete	Event	Opposition Result	Opposition Result	Opposition Result	Opposition Result	Opposition Result
Latika Bhandari	Bantamweight (-53kg)	BYE	Chhoeung Puthearim (CAM); W PUN 11-10	Sarita Phongsri (THA); L PTS 0-6	Did not advance	
Y Shantibala Devi	Featherweight (-57kg)	BYE	Kezang Lhamo (BHU); W PTS 7-0	Hou Yuzhuo (CHN); L PTS 0-13	Did not advance	
Srishti Singh	Lightweight (-62kg)		Shaden Thweib (JOR); L PTS 5-7	Did not advance		
Kamineni Srilakshmi	Heavyweight (+73kg)			Oh Jung-Ah (KOR); L PTS 0-9	Did not advance	

== Tennis ==
Athlete	Event	Round of 64	Round of 32	Round of 16	Quarterfinals	Semifinals	Final
Athlete	Event	Opposition Result	Opposition Result	Opposition Result	Opposition Result	Opposition Result	Opposition Result
Karan Rastogi	Men's singles	BYE	Myalikkuli Mamedkuliev (TKM); W 6-0, 6-0	Chen Ti (TPE); W 6-0, 6-4,	Denis Istomin (UZB); L 2-6, 6-4, 5-7	Did not advance	
Somdev Devvarman	Men's singles	BYE	Jabor Mohammed Al Mutawa (TKM); W 6-0, 6-0	Vaja Uzakov (UZB); W 6-1, 6-1	Zhang Ze (CHN); W 6-4, 6-4	Tatsuma Ito (JPN); W 6-2, 0-6, 6-3	Denis Istomin (UZB); W 6-1, 6-2 (gold)
Somdev Devvarman; Sanam Krishan Singh	Men's doubles		BYE	Johnny Arcilla (PHI) and Ruben Jr. Gonzalez (PHI); W 6-4, 6-2	Bai Yan (CHN) and Zhang Ze (CHN); W 6-2, 6-4	Yi Chu-huan (TPE) and Lee Hsin-han (TPE); W 6-4, 7-6(3)	Gong Maoxin (CHN) and Li Zhe (CHN); W 6-3, 6(4)-7, [10-8] (gold)
Karan Rastogi; Vishnu Vardhan	Men's doubles		Jack Hui (HKG) and Michael Lai (HKG); W 6-1, 6-3	Kim Young-jun (KOR) and Seol Jae-min (KOR); L 6-1, 3-6, [2-10]	Did not advance		
Somdev Devvarman; Karan Rastogi; Sanam Krishan Singh; Vishnu Vardhan	Men's team		BYE	Qatar (QAT); W 3-0 (2-0, 2-0, 2-0)	Thailand (THA); W 2-1 (2-0, 2-0, 1-2)	Chinese Taipei (TPE); L 1-2 (1-2, 2-0, 0-2) (bronze)	Did not advance
Sania Mirza	Women's singles		Venise Chan (HKG); W 6-1, 6-0	Zhang Shuai (CHN); W 6-2, 6-2	Tamarine Tanasugarn (THA); W 6-2, 6-3	Akgul Amanmuradova (UZB); L 7-6(7), 3-6, 4-6 (bronze)	Did not advance
Poojashree Venkatesha	Women's singles		Chang Kai-chen (KOR); L 2-6, 2-6	Did not advance			
Tara Iyer; Nirupama Sanjeev	Women's doubles		BYE	Sun Shengnan (CHN) and Zhang Shuai (CHN); L 4-6, 5-7	Did not advance		
Rushmi Chakravarthi; Poojashree Venkatesha	Women's doubles		Misaki Doi (JPN) and Ryuko Fuda (JPN); L 3-6, 1-6	Did not advance			
Sania Mirza; Nirupama Sanjeev; Rushmi Chakravarthi; Poojashree Venkatesha	Women's team			Indonesia (INA); L 0-3 (0-2, 1-2, 0-2)	Did not advance		
Sania Mirza; Vishnu Vardhan	Mixed doubles		BYE	Shengnan Sun (CHN) and Bai Yan (CHN); W 6-3, 4-6, [12-10]	Chuang Chia-jung (KOR) and Yi Chu-huan (KOR); W 2-6, 6-4, [10-4]	Tamarine Tanasugarn (THA) and Sanchai Ratiwatana (THA); W 6-3, 6(3)-7, [10-5]	Chan Yung-jan (TPE) and Yang Tsung-hua (TPE); W 6-4, 1-6, [2-10] (silver)
Rushmi Chakravarthi; Sanam Krishan Singh	Mixed doubles		Nigina Abduraimova (UZB) and Vaja Uzakov (UZB); W 7-5, 6-3	Yurika Sema (JPN) and Hiroki Kondo (JPN); W 4-6, 6-3, [3-10]	Did not advance		

== Triathlon ==
Athlete	Event	Swim (1.5 km)	Trans 1	Bike (40 km)	Trans 2	Run (10 km)	Total	Rank
Gurudatta Devidas Gharat	Men's Individual	23:05; 18th	1:10; 11th	1:08:57; 19th	1:11; 20th	DNF		
Pooja Naresh Chaurushi	Women's Individual	22:53; 8th	1:31; 11th	1:18:02; 10th	0:56; 10th	47:42; 10th	2:31:07.10	10th

== Volleyball ==
=== Men ===
Team

Sanjay Banwari
Vibin George
Pradeep Guttikonda
Naveen Manidurai
Ukkarapandian Mohan
Srikanth Pakalapati
Balwinder Singh
Gurinder Singh
Guruchand Singh
Navjit Singh
Sube Singh
K Sivasubramanian

==== Preliminary ====
Group B

Pos	Team	Pld	W	L	Pts	SPW	SPL	SPR	SW	SL	SR	Qualification
1	South Korea	3	3	0	6	225	148	1.520	9	0	MAX	Second round / Group E–F
2	India	3	2	1	5	232	222	1.045	6	4	1.500	Second round / Group E–F
3	Kazakhstan	3	1	2	4	236	252	0.937	4	7	0.571	Second round / Group G–H
4	Vietnam	3	0	3	3	175	246	0.711	1	9	0.111	Second round / Group G–H

Source: Results

Date	Time		Score		Set 1	Set 2	Set 3	Set 4	Set 5	Total
14 Nov	18:00	India	3–1	Kazakhstan	24–26	25–23	25–18	25–21		99–88
15 Nov	18:00	South Korea	3–0	India	25–19	25–20	25–19			75–58
16 Nov	18:00	India	3–0	Vietnam	25–20	25–16	25–23			75–59

==== Second round ====
- The results and the points of the matches between the same teams that were already played during the preliminary round shall be taken into account for the second round.

Group F

Pos	Team	Pld	W	L	Pts	SPW	SPL	SPR	SW	SL	SR	Qualification
1	South Korea	3	3	0	6	246	207	1.188	9	1	9.000	Quarterfinals
2	India	3	2	1	5	245	228	1.075	6	5	1.200	Quarterfinals
3	Japan	3	1	2	4	280	272	1.029	6	6	1.000	Quarterfinals
4	Qatar	3	0	3	3	168	232	0.724	0	9	0.000	Quarterfinals

Source: Results

Date	Time		Score		Set 1	Set 2	Set 3	Set 4	Set 5	Total
19 Nov	16:00	Japan	2–3	India	20–25	19–25	25–21	28–26	13–15	105–112
20 Nov	14:00	India	3–0	Qatar	25–15	25–13	25–20			75–48

==== Final round ====
Quarterfinals

Date	Time		Score		Set 1	Set 2	Set 3	Set 4	Set 5	Total
21 Nov	16:00	India	0–3	Thailand	20–25	23–25	22–25			65–75

Placement 5–8

Date	Time		Score		Set 1	Set 2	Set 3	Set 4	Set 5	Total
24 Nov	14:00	Qatar	0–3	India	23–25	16–25	17–25			56–75

Placement 5th–6th

Date	Time		Score		Set 1	Set 2	Set 3	Set 4	Set 5	Total
26 Nov	20:00	India	0–3	China	18–25	17–25	18–25			53–75

=== Women ===
Team

Minimol Abraham
Terin Antony
Priyanka Bora
Princy Joseph
Shibi Joseph
R Kattuparabath
Priyanka Khedkar
Aswani Kiran
J Palakkamattathil
Tiji Raju
Soorya Thottangal
Soumya Vengadan

==== Preliminary ====
Group B

Pos	Team	Pld	W	L	Pts	SPW	SPL	SPR	SW	SL	SR	Qualification
1	Kazakhstan	5	5	0	10	443	317	1.397	15	4	3.750	Quarterfinals
2	North Korea	5	4	1	9	431	316	1.364	14	5	2.800	Quarterfinals
3	Japan	5	3	2	8	395	344	1.148	10	8	1.250	Quarterfinals
4	Chinese Taipei	5	2	3	7	429	365	1.175	11	9	1.222	Quarterfinals
5	India	5	1	4	6	260	319	0.815	3	12	0.250	Placement 9–11
6	Maldives	5	0	5	5	78	375	0.208	0	15	0.000	Placement 9–11

Source: Results

Date	Time		Score		Set 1	Set 2	Set 3	Set 4	Set 5	Total
18 Nov	16:00	North Korea	3–0	India	25–23	25–13	25–20			75–56
19 Nov	14:00	Maldives	0–3	India	6–25	7–25	6–25			19–75
20 Nov	16:00	India	0–3	Japan	23–25	16–25	17–25			56–75
21 Nov	12:00	Kazakhstan	3–0	India	25–18	25–9	25–10			75–37
22 Nov	14:00	India	0–3	Chinese Taipei	12–25	12–25	12–25			36–75

==== Placement ====
Placement 9–10th

Date	Time		Score		Set 1	Set 2	Set 3	Set 4	Set 5	Total
25 Nov	12:00	India	3–0	Maldives	25–4	25–5	25–7			75–16

== Water polo ==
=== Women ===
Team

Anil Kumar Ambili Archa
Shubhangi Bhoite
Siddhi Prabhakar Dahe
Malavika Gubbi
Varshini Gubbi
Sayali Sanjay Gudhekar
M Prasad Eekshitha
Mini Madhavan
Rema Nithya Madhusoodanan
S Muninanjappa Sridhar
Saranya Sasidharan Nair
Renu T Ramesh
Biji Varghese

Pos	Team	Pld	W	D	L	GF	GA	GD	Pts
1	China	3	3	0	0	76	8	+68	6
2	Kazakhstan	3	2	0	1	57	20	+37	4
3	Uzbekistan	3	1	0	2	26	41	−15	2
4	India	3	0	0	3	6	96	−90	0

Source: Results

November 15; 14:30	Report	Kazakhstan	38–2	India	Tianhe Natatorium, Guangzhou; Referees: Tan (SIN), Chung (HKG)
November 15; 14:30	Report	Score by quarters: 13–1, 14–0, 8–0, 3–1			Tianhe Natatorium, Guangzhou; Referees: Tan (SIN), Chung (HKG)
November 15; 14:30	Report	Myrzabekova 5	Goals	Varghese, Bhoite 1	Tianhe Natatorium, Guangzhou; Referees: Tan (SIN), Chung (HKG)

November 16; 15:55	Report	China	38–2	India	Tianhe Natatorium, Guangzhou; Referees: Makihashi (JPN), Salnichenko (KAZ)
November 16; 15:55	Report	Score by quarters: 10–0, 12–1, 8–1, 8–0			Tianhe Natatorium, Guangzhou; Referees: Makihashi (JPN), Salnichenko (KAZ)
November 16; 15:55	Report	Song D.L. 12	Goals	Gudhekar, M. Gubbi 1	Tianhe Natatorium, Guangzhou; Referees: Makihashi (JPN), Salnichenko (KAZ)

November 17; 14:30	Report	Uzbekistan	20–2	India	Tianhe Natatorium, Guangzhou; Referees: Ni (CHN), Shi (CHN)
November 17; 14:30	Report	Score by quarters: 5–1, 5–0, 5–0, 5–1			Tianhe Natatorium, Guangzhou; Referees: Ni (CHN), Shi (CHN)
November 17; 14:30	Report	Sarancha 5	Goals	Bhoite, V. Gubbi 1	Tianhe Natatorium, Guangzhou; Referees: Ni (CHN), Shi (CHN)

== Weightlifting ==
Athlete	Event	Snatch			Clean & jerk			Total	Rank
Athlete	Event	Attempt 1	Attempt 2	Attempt 3	Attempt 1	Attempt 2	Attempt 3	Total	Rank
Srinivasa Rao Balluri	Men's 56 kg	100	105	110	135	~~142~~	~~142~~	245	8th
Sukhen Dey	Men's 56 kg	~~104~~	104	~~108~~	~~126~~	~~126~~	126	230	10th
Rustam Sarang	Men's 62 kg	112	117	~~120~~	142	147	~~150~~	264	9th
Omkar Shekhar Otari	Men's 62 kg	115	120	~~124~~	135	140	~~145~~	260	11th
Katulu Ravi Kumar	Men's 69 kg	~~140~~	~~140~~	141	170	~~180~~	~~180~~	311	5th
Sudhir Chitradurga	Men's 77 kg	127	131	135	155	160	~~165~~	295	6th
Chandrakant Dadu Mali	Men's 85 kg	138	~~144~~	~~145~~	~~171~~	~~171~~	171	309	10th
Sarabjit Sarabjit	Men's +105 kg	150	160	~~171~~	180	~~200~~	~~200~~	340	10th
Ngangbam Soniya Chanu	Women's 48 kg	~~70~~	70	75	90	95	~~99~~	170	5th
Atom Sandyarani Devi	Women's 48 kg	66	70	~~73~~	84	88	~~91~~	158	6th
Monika Devi	Women's 69 kg	90	95	~~98~~	110	117	~~121~~	212	7th
Geeta Rani	Women's +75 kg	95	~~100~~	~~100~~	120	127	132	227	6th

== Wrestling ==
=== Men ===
Freestyle

Athlete	Event	Round of 16	Quarterfinals	Semifinals	Final
Athlete	Event	Opposition Result	Opposition Result	Opposition Result	Opposition Result
Vinod Kumar	55 kg	Dilshod Mansurov (UZB); L PO 0-3	Did not advance		
Pradeep Kumar	66 kg	Mustafa Al-Haimi (YEM); W VT 5-0	Tatsuhiro Yonemitsu (JPN); L PO 0-3	Repechage Round 1 match: Azat Donbaev (KGZ); W PP 3-1	Bronze medal match: Yang Chun-Song (PRK); L PP 1-3
Narsingh Pancham Yadav	74 kg	Husham Majeed (IRQ); W PP 3-1	Dorjvaanchigiin Gombodorj (MGL); L PP 1-3	Did not advance	
Ram Vir	84 kg	BYE	Aibek Usupov (KGZ); W VT 5-0	Lee Jae-Sung (KOR); L PP 1-3	Bronze medal match: Pürveegiin Ösökhbaatar (MGL); L PP 1-3
Mausam Khatri	96 kg	Taimuraz Tigiyev (KAZ); L PP 1-3	Did not advance	Repechage Round 1 match: Raja Al-Karrad (SYR); W PP 3-1	Bronze medal match: Kim Jae-Gang (KOR); W PP 3-1 (bronze)
Rajeev Tomar	120 kg	Aiaal Lazarev (KGZ); L PP 1-3	Did not advance		

Greco-Roman

Athlete	Event	Round of 16	Quarterfinals	Semifinals	Final
Athlete	Event	Opposition Result	Opposition Result	Opposition Result	Opposition Result
Rajender Kumar	55 kg	Li Shujin (CHN); L PP 1-3	Did not advance		
Ravinder Singh	60 kg	BYE	Nurbakyt Tengizbayev (KAZ); W PP 3-1	Jung Ji-Hyun (KOR); L PO 0-3	Bronze medal match: Muhammad Aliansyah (INA); W PP 3-1 (bronze)
Sunilkumar Rana	66 kg	BYE	Yazgeldy Kadyrov (TKM); W PO 3-0	Saeid Abdevali (IRI); L PO 0-3	Bronze medal match: Sutep Oomchompoo (THA); W VT 5-0 (bronze)
Sanjay Kumar	74 kg	Park Jin-Sung (KOR); L PO 0-3	Did not advance	Repechage Round 1 match: Roman Melyoshin (KAZ); L PO 0-3	Did not advance
Manoj Kumar	84 kg	Ali Awarke (LIB); W PO 3-0	Nezar Oudeh (SYR); W PO 3-0	Taleb Nematpour (IRI); L PO 0-3	Bronze medal match: Janarbek Kenjeev (KGZ); L P0 0-3
Anil Kumar	96 kg	Azamat Erkimbaev (KGZ) 'L PO 0-3	Did not advance		
Dharmender Dalal	120 kg	Hirokazu Shinjo (JPN); W PP 3-1	Nurmakhan Tinaliyev (KAZ); L PO 0-3	Repechage Round 1 match: Chum Chivinn (CAM); W PO 3-0	Bronze medal match: Ali Nadhim (IRQ); L P0 0-3

=== Women ===
Freestyle

Athlete	Event	Round of 16	Quarterfinals	Semifinals	Final
Athlete	Event	Opposition Result	Opposition Result	Opposition Result	Opposition Result
Nirmala Devi	48 kg	Zhuldyz Eshimova (KAZ); L PP 1-3	Did not advance		
Geeta Phogat	55 kg	Um Ji-Eun (KOR); W PP 3-1	Pak Yon-Hui (PRK); L PP 1-3	Did not advance	
Suman Kundu	63 kg	Luong Thi Quyen (VIE); W PP 3-1	Nestan Kiiazova (KGZ); W PP 3-1	Ochirbatyn Nasanburmaa (MGL); L PO 0-3	Bronze medal match: Chen Meng (CHN); L VT 0-5
Gursharan Preet Kaur	72 kg		Guzel Manyurova (KAZ); L VT 0-5	Did not advance	

== Wushu ==
=== Men ===
Changquan

Athlete	Event	Changquan		Total	
Athlete	Event	Result	Rank	Result	Rank
Dewan Singh Huidrom	Changquan	9.07	11th		

Nanquan\Nangun

Athlete	Event	Nanquan		Nangun		Total	
Athlete	Event	Result	Rank	Result	Rank	Result	Rank
Somorjit Sagolsem	Nanquan\Nangun All-Round	8.10	14th	7.65	14th	15.75	14th

Taijiquan\Taijijian

Athlete	Event	Taijijian		Taijiquan		Total	
Athlete	Event	Result	Rank	Result	Rank	Result	Rank
Gyandash Singh	Taijiquan\Taijijian All-Round	8.27	16th	8.10	18th	16.37	18th

Sanda

Athlete	Event	Round of 16	Quarterfinals	Semifinals	Final
Athlete	Event	Opposition Result	Opposition Result	Opposition Result	Opposition Result
Santosh Kumar	56 kg	Khalid Hotak (AFG); L PTS 0-2	Did not advance		
M. Bimoljit Singh	60 kg	Syed Maratab Ali Shah (PAK); W AV 0-0	Bouapha Valasith (LAO); W KO 1-0	Mohsen Mohammadseifi (IRI); L PTS 0-2 (bronze)	Did not advance
Sandeep Yadav	70 kg	Vuong Dinh Khanh (VIE); L PTS 0-2	Did not advance		
Ravinder Kumar	75 kg	Hamid Reza Gholipour (IRI); L PTS 0-2	Did not advance		

=== Women ===
Changquan

Athlete	Event	Changquan		Total	
Athlete	Event	Result	Rank	Result	Rank
Ngangom Ayapana Toshibala	Changquan	7.83	9th		

Sanda

Athlete	Event	Round of 16	Quarterfinals	Semifinals	Final
Athlete	Event	Opposition Result	Opposition Result	Opposition Result	Opposition Result
Yumnam Sanathoi Devi	52 kg	Khammai Lathsavong (LAO); W PTS 2-0	E Meidie (CHN); L PTS 0-2	Did not advance	
W. Sandhyarani Devi	60 kg	BYE	Moria Manalu (INA); W PTS 2-0	Paloy Barckkham (LAO); W PTS 2-0	Khadijeh Azadpour (IRI); L PTS 0-2 (silver)
