= Nasser Hussein =

Nasser or Nasir Hussain, Hussein or Hossain may refer to:

- Nasser Hussain (born 1968), England cricketer
- Nasser Hussain (rugby union), Indian rugby union player
- Hussein ibn Nasser, Prime Minister of Jordan from 1963 to 1964
- Abdelkarim Hussein Mohamed Al-Nasser, alleged Saudi terrorist
- Nasir Hussain, Indian film producer and director
- Nasir Hussain (actor) or Nazir Hussain, Indian film actor
- Nasir Hossain, Bangladeshi cricketer
- Nasir Hossain (Sylhet cricketer), Bangladeshi cricketer
