= Rowing at the 2010 Asian Games – Men's coxless four =

Men's coxless four at the 2010 Asian Games
- Venue: Guangzhou International Rowing Centre
- Date: 14–18 November 2010
- Competitors: 24 from 6 nations

Medalists
gold medal	China; Liu Kun, Li Dongjian, Wu Lin, Sun Zhaowen
silver medal	India; Saji Thomas, Jenil Krishnan, Anil Kumar, Ranjit Singh
bronze medal	Uzbekistan; Efim Kuznetsov, Botir Murodov, Yokub Khamzaev, Sergey Tyan

The men's coxless four competition at the 2010 Asian Games in Guangzhou, China was held from 14 November to 18 November at the International Rowing Centre.

== Schedule ==
All times are China Standard Time (UTC+08:00)

Date	Time	Event
Sunday, 14 November 2010	11:10	Heat
Thursday, 18 November 2010	11:20	Final

== Results ==
=== Heat ===
- Qualification: 1–6 → Final (FA)

Rank	Team	Time	Notes
1	China (CHN); Liu Kun; Li Dongjian; Wu Lin; Sun Zhaowen	6:02.44	FA
2	India (IND); Saji Thomas; Jenil Krishnan; Anil Kumar; Ranjit Singh	6:11.89	FA
3	Uzbekistan (UZB); Efim Kuznetsov; Botir Murodov; Yokub Khamzaev; Sergey Tyan	6:21.10	FA
4	Iraq (IRQ); Mohammed Hamed; Ahmed Sattar; Ahmed Abdul-Salam; Hamza Hussein	6:22.89	FA
5	Kazakhstan (KAZ); Grigoriy Feklistov; Vitaliy Vassilyev; Yevgeniy Latypov; Dmitriy Filimonov	6:28.08	FA
6	Iran (IRI); Farzad Gholizadeh; Saeid Adeli; Farhad Gholizadeh; Vahid Johari	6:34.47	FA

=== Final ===
Rank	Team	Time
1st place, gold medalist(s)	China (CHN); Liu Kun; Li Dongjian; Wu Lin; Sun Zhaowen	6:06.40
2nd place, silver medalist(s)	India (IND); Saji Thomas; Jenil Krishnan; Anil Kumar; Ranjit Singh	6:16.79
3rd place, bronze medalist(s)	Uzbekistan (UZB); Efim Kuznetsov; Botir Murodov; Yokub Khamzaev; Sergey Tyan	6:22.70
4	Kazakhstan (KAZ); Grigoriy Feklistov; Vitaliy Vassilyev; Yevgeniy Latypov; Dmitriy Filimonov	6:26.35
5	Iraq (IRQ); Mohammed Hamed; Ahmed Sattar; Ahmed Abdul-Salam; Hamza Hussein	6:27.05
6	Iran (IRI); Farzad Gholizadeh; Saeid Adeli; Farhad Gholizadeh; Vahid Johari	6:31.36
