= Nasir Hossain (disambiguation) =

Nasir Hossain is the name of:

- Nasir Hossain (born 1991), Bangladeshi cricketer
- Nasir Hossain (Sylhet cricketer), a different cricketer from Bangladesh
- Nasir Hussain, Indian film producer
- Nazir Hussain, Indian actor
- Syed Nazeer Husain, Islamic scholar
