= Rowing at the 2010 Asian Games – Women's coxless four =

Women's coxless four at the 2010 Asian Games
- Venue: Guangzhou International Rowing Centre
- Date: 14–18 November 2010
- Competitors: 24 from 6 nations

Medalists
| gold medal | China; Ji Zhen, Li Xin, Liu Jiahuan, Ding Yanjie |
| silver medal | South Korea; Lee Eun-hye, Kim Ka-yeong, Ra Hye-mi, Kim A-rum |
| bronze medal | Kazakhstan; Mariya Filimonova, Yekaterina Artemyeva, Svetlana Germanovich, Oxana Nazarova |

The women's coxless four competition at the 2010 Asian Games in Guangzhou, China was held from 14 November to 18 November at the International Rowing Centre.

== Schedule ==
All times are China Standard Time (UTC+08:00)

| Date | Time | Event |
|---|---|---|
| Sunday, 14 November 2010 | 11:00 | Heat |
| Thursday, 18 November 2010 | 11:05 | Final |

== Results ==
=== Heat ===
- Qualification: 1–4 → Final (FA)

| Rank | Team | Time | Notes |
|---|---|---|---|
| 1 | China (CHN); Ji Zhen; Li Xin; Liu Jiahuan; Ding Yanjie | 6:48.62 | FA |
| 2 | South Korea (KOR); Lee Eun-hye; Kim Ka-yeong; Ra Hye-mi; Kim A-rum | 6:56.78 | FA |
| 3 | Indonesia (INA); Sri Rahayu Masi; Ratna; Femmy Yuartini Elia; Femmy Batuwael | 7:02.48 | FA |
| 4 | Kazakhstan (KAZ); Mariya Filimonova; Yekaterina Artemyeva; Svetlana Germanovich; Oxana Nazarova | 7:03.80 | FA |
| 5 | India (IND); Khumanthem Monalisa Chanu; Tababi Devi Ngangom; Rameshwori Devi Oinam; Shruti Kamath | 7:09.91 | FA |
| 6 | North Korea (PRK); Jang Myong-hwa; Han Kum-hui; Kim Ryon-ok; Sin Hyang-suk | 7:14.29 | FA |

=== Final ===
| Rank | Team | Time |
|---|---|---|
| 1st place, gold medalist(s) | China (CHN); Ji Zhen; Li Xin; Liu Jiahuan; Ding Yanjie | 6:51.56 |
| 2nd place, silver medalist(s) | South Korea (KOR); Lee Eun-hye; Kim Ka-yeong; Ra Hye-mi; Kim A-rum | 6:56.90 |
| 3rd place, bronze medalist(s) | Kazakhstan (KAZ); Mariya Filimonova; Yekaterina Artemyeva; Svetlana Germanovich; Oxana Nazarova | 6:59.24 |
| 4 | North Korea (PRK); Jang Myong-hwa; Han Kum-hui; Kim Ryon-ok; Sin Hyang-suk | 7:08.78 |
| 5 | India (IND); Khumanthem Monalisa Chanu; Tababi Devi Ngangom; Rameshwori Devi Oinam; Shruti Kamath | 7:08.85 |
| 6 | Indonesia (INA); Sri Rahayu Masi; Ratna; Femmy Yuartini Elia; Femmy Batuwael | 7:11.91 |
