= Vikram Bhatnagar =

Indian shooter

Personal information
- Nationality: Indian
- Occupation: Sport shooter
Medal record
Men's shooting
Representing India
Asian Championships
Gold medal – first place	2009 Almaty	Double trap team

Vikram Bhatnagar is an Indian sport shooter. He started his career in International Sports Shooting with winning the silver medal in the Men's Double Trap (Pairs) with Rajyavardhan Singh Rathore at the 2006 Commonwealth Games.

He is an MBA and LLB Graduate and has interests Education and Development. He was selected as the Chairman of Aryabhatt College, University of Delhi - (South) by the Vice Chancellor of Delhi University during 2020–2021.

== Awards ==
He won many awards and medals along with Delhi state Rajiv Gandhi Khel Ratna Award. He won gold medal in the Asian Clay Shooting Championships in September 2006 which held in Singapore on behalf of the Indian Double Trap team. He won silver medal with team at Asian Games, Doha, Qatar in December 2006, and won the Delhi State Rajiv Gandhi Khel Ratna Award on 22 August 2007. In 2008, he started the year with a Grand Prix Bronze medal at the Asian Clay Shooting Championships in Jaipur. He is the 2008 National Champion at Jaipur with the score of 144/150 + 47/50 = 191/200. He was a part of the team that won Gold in Asian Clay shooting Championships in Almaty Kazakhstan in September 2009. He won gold medal in National Shotgun Championships, Patiala in November 2009. He won the pair Gold in the Commonwealth Games Federation Shooting Championships in February 2010, along with the Bronze in the individual category. At the World Cup in Acapulco, Mexico in March 2010, he placed 4th in the world with a score of 140/150 and 46/50 in the final. His World Ranking as in July 2010 was World No 10, in Men's Double Trap event, making him the highest ranked Indian Shooter in this event. Throughout his career, Vikram Bhatnagar has left an indelible mark on the world of Clay Shooting, showcasing his talent at the Commonwealth Games (2006), competing in two Commonwealth Federation Shooting Championships, 19 World Cups, 5 Asian Championships, 3 World Championships, and 2 Asian Games. His achievements have established him as a leading figure in the sport.

Championship	Year	Medal
Asian Clay Shooting Championships, Singapore	September 2006	Gold Medal
National Championships, Jaipur	2008	Gold Medal
Asian Clay Shooting Championships, Almaty, KZ	2009	Gold Medal
National Championships, Patiala	2009	Gold Medal
Commonwealth Federation Shooting Championships, Delhi	2010	Gold Medal
Commonwealth Games, Melbourne	2006	Silver Medal
Asian Games, Doha – Qatar	December 2006	Silver Medal
National Championships, Jaipur	2007	Silver Medal
National Championships, Delhi	2010	Silver Medal
National Championships, Hyderabad	2002	Bronze Medal
National Championships, Hyderabad	2005	Bronze Medal
National Championships, Delhi	2006	Bronze Medal
Asian Clay Shooting Championships, Jaipur	2008	Bronze Medal
Asian Clay Shooting Championship Grand Prix, Jaipur	2008	Bronze Medal
Thailand Open Championships, Bangkok	2008	Bronze Medal
Commonwealth Federation Shooting Championships, Delhi	2010	Bronze Medal
Asian Games, China	2010	Bronze Medal

=== Other professional activities ===
Vikram Bhatnagar is the President of Precision Shooting Club and is involved in conducting leisure-based Shooting sports competitions. https://precisionshootingclub.com/

Vikram Bhatnagar is the Vice Chairman of Bhatnagar International School, Vasant Kunj, New Delhi.

In 2012–13, he was a part of the 5 man committee formed by N.R.A.I that formulated the rules submitted to Ministry of Home Affairs for easing of Arms Licensing and Imports for Renowned Shots, Aspiring Shooters and Junior Shooters. Thus helping in reducing the age of arms ownership for competitive sports to 12 years.

Vikram is an existing member of N.R.A.I Athletes Grievance Committee since 2012, and has contributed towards ensuring discipline in Indian Shooting Sports persons.

He is the Sole Nominee of NRAI to TIDC under which programmes like Khelo India, etc. are conducted.

In 2014, he was nominated by President NRAI to oversee the Indo-Bhutan 300m Big Bore event to be held along with the coronation of the King of Bhutan. This sports interchange is under the guidelines of SAARC sports outreach programme.

Since 2011, he has organised Air Rifle/Air Pistol events at Intra School Level multiple times, and organised a Shotgun Event in 2024. https://precisionshootingclub.com/events-organized-by-psc/
