= Navjit Singh =

Indian volleyball player (born 1991)

Navjit

Personal information
- Full name: Navjit Singh Badesha
- Born: 1 July 1991 (age 35); Rampur
- Height: 205 cm (6 ft 9 in)
- Weight: 82 kg (181 lb)
- Spike: 350 cm (140 in)
- Block: 334 cm (131 in)

Volleyball information
- Position: Middle Blocker
- Current club: Punjab

National team
2006 - Present	India

Navjit Singh (born 1 July 1991), known as Navjit is an Indian volleyball player.

== Early life ==
Navjit Singh was born on 1 July 1991 is from Rampur Near Nurmahal, Teh. Phillaur, Dist. Jalandhar, Punjab, India.
