= Vani Kapoor =

Indian golfer

Vani Kapoor is an Indian golfer.

She won the fifth leg of the 2020 Hero Women's Pro Golf Tour.
