= Jenil Krishnan =

Indian rower

- President of India, Dr. A.P.J. Abdul Kalam presenting the Arjuna Award for the year 2004 to Jenil Krishnan for Rowing, at a function in New Delhi on August 29, 2005

Personal information
- Nationality: Indian
- Born: 25 May 1977 (age 49) Arunoottymangalam, Mavelikkara, Kerala, India

Sport
- Country: India
- Sport: Rowing
- Event: Men's coxless four
Medal record
Men's rowing
Representing India
Asian Games
Bronze medal – third place	2002 Busan	Men's coxless four
Silver medal – second place	2006 Doha	Men's coxless four
Silver medal – second place	2010 Guangzhou	Men's four

Jenil Krishnan (born 25 May 1977) is a former Indian rower who represented India at the Asian Games. He won a bronze medal in the men's coxless four at the 2002 Asian Games in Busan and silver medals at the 2006 Asian Games in Doha and the 2010 Asian Games in Guangzhou. He received the Arjuna Award in 2004 for rowing.

== Career ==
Krishnan won a bronze medal in the men's coxless four at the 2002 Asian Games in Busan, South Korea, alongside Inderpal Singh, Roshan Lal and Paulose Pandari Kunnel.

He was part of the Indian men's coxless four crew that won a silver medal at the 2006 Asian Games in Doha, Qatar, in rowing. This was his second Asian Games medal, following the bronze he had won in Busan. At the 2010 Asian Games in Guangzhou, China, Krishnan won another silver medal as a member of the Indian men's four crew, alongside Anil Kumar, Saji Thomas and Ranjit Singh. The team finished behind China with a time of 6:16.79.

=== Military career ===
Krishnan served in the Indian Army's Corps of Electronics and Mechanical Engineers (EME), where he held the rank of Naib Subedar.

== Awards and honours ==
- 2004: Received the Arjuna Award in rowing from the Government of India.
