= Nasser Hussain (rugby union) =

- Born: 9 March 1980 (age 46) Maharashtra, India
- Height: 1.76 m (5 ft 9 in)
- Weight: 84 kg (13 st 3 lb)

Rugby union career
- Position: wing/fullback .
Senior career
Years	Team	Apps	(Points)
1998–03 & 2013–15	Bombay Gymkhana		
International career
Years	Team	Apps	(Points)
1998–2008	India	26	(80)

Nasser Hussain (born 9 March 1980) is the former Indian rugby union player and the former captain of the India national rugby union team. He plays for the Bombay Gymkhana Club in Mumbai, India, and has also played abroad for Tynedale R.F.C. & Northumbria University in Newcastle upon Tyne, England. His international debut was on 26 October 1998 in Singapore against the host country. He is nicknamed as El-Nino. As of 2008, he has 26 test caps and has scored 16 tries for his country.
