= Nasir Hossain (Sylhet cricketer) =

Bangladeshi cricketer

Domestic team information
- Years: Team
- 2002/03–2003/04: Sylhet Division
- FC debut: 10 December 2002 Sylhet Division v Rajshahi Division
- Last FC: 15 March 2011 Sylhet Division v Dhaka Division
- LA debut: 13 December 2002 Sylhet Division v Rajshahi Division
- Last LA: 17 January 2003 Sylhet Division v Khulna Division

Career statistics
Competition	First-class	List A
Matches	8	4
Runs scored	61	0
Batting average	6.10	–
100s/50s	0/0	0/0
Top score	20*	0*
Balls bowled	982	186
Wickets	19	10
Bowling average	24.05	10.70
5 wickets in innings	1	1
10 wickets in match	0	0
Best bowling	5/28	5/8
Catches/stumpings	1/–	0/–
- Source: CricketArchive, 15 December 2016

Nasir Hossain is a first-class and List A cricketer from Bangladesh who played for Sylhet Division between 2002/03 and 2003/04. His best performance was a remarkable spell of 5 for 8, opening the bowling against Chittagong Division in a one-day match in 2002. Chittagong were bowled out for just 30, with Rezaul Haque taking 4 for 20, and Sylhet Division knocked off the runs they needed in just 6.2 overs. This is one of the shortest one day games on record, lasting just 26 overs and a ball in all.
