= Saji Thomas =

Indian rower

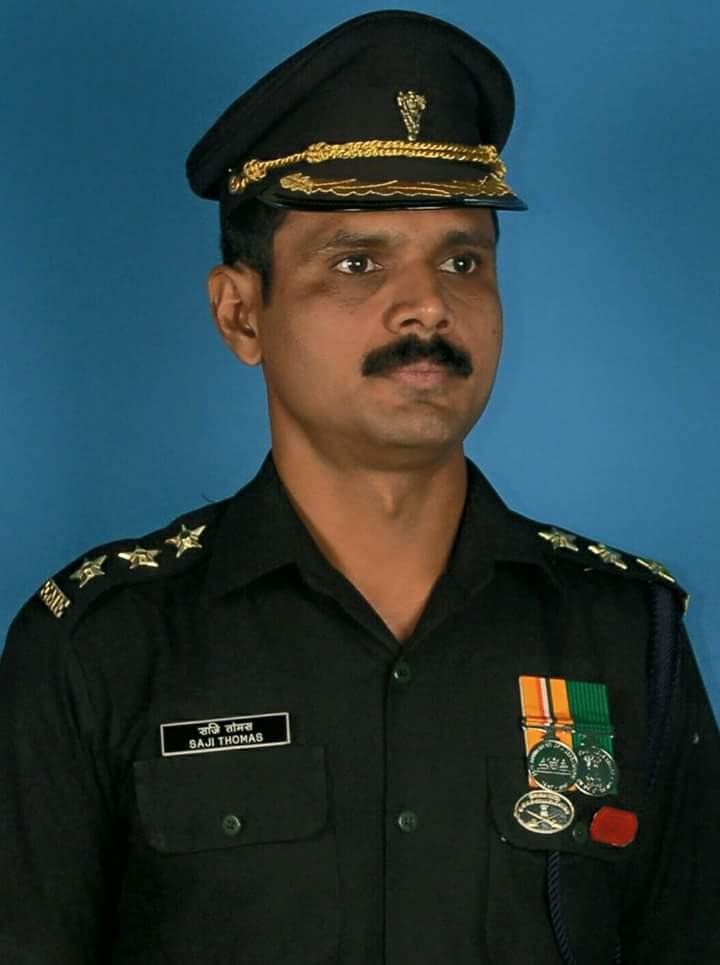

Personal information
- National team: India
- Born: Chempumpuram, Alappuzha, Kerala, India
- Height: 186 cm (6 ft 1 in)
- Weight: 70 kg (154 lb)

Sport
- Country: India
- Sport: Rowing

Saji Thomas is an Indian rower from Alappuzha, Kerala. Thomas was a participant in three Asian Games and World Rowing Championships. He has won 13 medals in various international competitions, including medals in all main boat classes of both sweep rowing and sculling in major regattas – the only Indian with this achievement. The Arjuna Award was conferred on him by the Government of India in 2014.
