= Badminton at the 2008 Summer Olympics =

Badminton at the Games of the XXIX Olympiad
- Venue: Beijing University of Technology Gymnasium
- Dates: 9–17 August 2008
- No. of events: 5 (2 men, 2 women, 1 mixed)
- Competitors: 173 from 50 nations

Badminton competitions at the Beijing 2008 Summer Olympics were held from 9 August to 17 August at the Beijing University of Technology Gymnasium.

== Qualification ==
The qualification for 2008 Summer Olympics began from May 2007 until April 2008. During that period, all of tournaments sanctioned by the Badminton World Federation (except test events) awarded points to qualify for Olympic Games.

== Competition schedule ==
| August | 9 | 10 | 11 | 12 | 13 | 14 | 15 | 16 | 17 |
|---|---|---|---|---|---|---|---|---|---|
| Men's singles | Round of 64 | Round of 64 | Round of 32 | Round of 16 | | Quarterfinal | Semifinal | Bronze | Final |
| Women's singles | Round of 64 | Round of 32 | Round of 16 | | Quarterfinal | | Semifinal | Bronze & final | |
| Men's doubles | | | | Round of 16 | Quarterfinal | | Semifinal | Bronze & final | |
| Women's doubles | | Round of 16 | Quarterfinal | | Semifinal | | Bronze & final | | |
| Mixed doubles | | | | Round of 16 | | Quarterfinal | | Semifinal | Bronze & final |

== Participating nations ==
- Algeria (1)
- Australia (6)
- Belarus (1)
- Bulgaria (1)
- Canada (4)
- China (19)
- Chinese Taipei (4)
- Czech Republic (2)
- Denmark (10)
- Egypt (1)
- Estonia (2)
- Finland (2)
- France (2)
- Germany (6)
- Great Britain (6)
- Guatemala (1)
- Hong Kong (3)
- Iceland (1)
- India (2)
- Indonesia (11)
- Iran (1)
- Ireland (2)
- Italy (1)
- Japan (10)
- Lithuania (2)
- Malaysia (9)
- Mauritius (1)
- Mexico (1)
- New Zealand (1)
- Nigeria (1)
- Peru (1)
- Poland (5)
- Portugal (2)
- Russia (2)
- Seychelles (2)
- Singapore (5)
- Slovakia (1)
- Slovenia (1)
- South Africa (5)
- South Korea (13)
- Spain (2)
- Sri Lanka (1)
- Sweden (1)
- Switzerland (2)
- Thailand (3)
- Uganda (1)
- Ukraine (3)
- United States (5)
- Vietnam (2)
- Zambia (1)

== Draw ==
The draw of the competition was held on July 26, 2008 in Beijing Henan Plaza Hotel at 16:00 CST (UTC+8). The draw was originally scheduled on August 4, 2008, just five days before the start of the competition. However it was brought forward to ensure better television broadcast scheduling.

== Medal summary ==
=== Medal table ===
Retrieved from Beijing Olympics 2008 official website.

| Rank | Nation | Gold | Silver | Bronze | Total |
|---|---|---|---|---|---|
| 1 | China | 3 | 2 | 3 | 8 |
| 2 | Indonesia | 1 | 1 | 1 | 3 |
| 2 | South Korea | 1 | 1 | 1 | 3 |
| 4 | Malaysia | 0 | 1 | 0 | 1 |
| Totals (4 entries) | | 5 | 5 | 5 | 15 |

=== Medalists ===
| Event | Gold | Silver | Bronze |
|---|---|---|---|
| Men's singles | Lin Dan; China | Lee Chong Wei; Malaysia | Chen Jin; China |
| Men's doubles | Markis Kido/Hendra Setiawan; Indonesia | Cai Yun/Fu Haifeng; China | Lee Jae-jin/Hwang Ji-man; South Korea |
| Women's singles | Zhang Ning; China | Xie Xingfang; China | Maria Kristin Yulianti; Indonesia |
| Women's doubles | Du Jing/Yu Yang; China | Lee Kyung-won/Lee Hyo-jung; South Korea | Zhang Yawen/Wei Yili; China |
| Mixed doubles | Lee Yong-dae/Lee Hyo-jung; South Korea | Nova Widianto/Liliyana Natsir; Indonesia | He Hanbin/Yu Yang; China |

== Results ==
=== Men's singles ===
Quarterfinals
1 | Lin Dan (CHN) | 21 | 21
8 | Peter Gade (DEN) | 13 | 16
4 | Chen Jin (CHN) | 21 | 21
Hsieh Yu-Hsing (TPE) | 8 | 14
Lee Hyun-il (KOR) | 23 | 21
3 | Bao Chunlai (CHN) | 21 | 11
6 | Sony Dwi Kuncoro (INA) | 9 | 11
2 | Lee Chong Wei (MAS) | 21 | 21

Semifinals
1 | Lin Dan (CHN) | 21 | 21
4 | Chen Jin (CHN) | 12 | 18
Lee Hyun-il (KOR) | 18 | 21 | 13
2 | Lee Chong Wei (MAS) | 21 | 13 | 21

Finals
1 | Lin Dan (CHN) | 21 | 21
2 | Lee Chong Wei (MAS) | 12 | 8
Third place
4 | Chen Jin (CHN) | 21 | 12 | 21
Lee Hyun-il (KOR) | 16 | 21 | 14

=== Women's singles ===
Quarterfinals
1 | Xie Xingfang (CHN) | 21 | 22
7 | Xu Huaiwen (GER) | 19 | 20
3 | Lu Lan (CHN) | 21 | 29
8 | Wong Mew Choo (MAS) | 7 | 27
Maria Kristin Yulianti (INA) | 26 | 21 | 21
Saina Nehwal (IND) | 28 | 14 | 15
5 | Pi Hongyan (FRA) | 8 | 21 | 19
2 | Zhang Ning (CHN) | 21 | 19 | 21

Semifinals
1 | Xie Xingfang (CHN) | 7 | 21 | 21
3 | Lu Lan (CHN) | 21 | 10 | 12
Maria Kristin Yulianti (INA) | 15 | 15
2 | Zhang Ning (CHN) | 21 | 21

Finals
1 | Xie Xingfang (CHN) | 12 | 21 | 18
2 | Zhang Ning (CHN) | 21 | 10 | 21
Third place
3 | Lu Lan (CHN) | 21 | 13 | 15
Maria Kristin Yulianti (INA) | 11 | 21 | 21

=== Men's doubles ===
Quarterfinals
1 | Markis Kido (INA); Hendra Setiawan (INA) | 21 | 21
Koo Kien Keat (MAS); Tan Boon Heong (MAS) | 16 | 18
Lars Paaske (DEN); Jonas Rasmussen (DEN) | 17 | 21 | 21
Michał Łogosz (POL); Robert Mateusiak (POL) | 21 | 11 | 15
Tadashi Ohtsuka (JPN); Keita Masuda (JPN) | 12 | 21 | 9
Lee Jae-jin (KOR); Hwang Ji-man (KOR) | 21 | 18 | 21
Howard Bach (USA); Bob Malaythong (USA) | 9 | 10
2 | Fu Haifeng (CHN); Cai Yun (CHN) | 21 | 21

Semifinals
1 | Markis Kido (INA); Hendra Setiawan (INA) | 21 | 21
Lars Paaske (DEN); Jonas Rasmussen (DEN) | 19 | 17
Lee Jae-jin (KOR); Hwang Ji-man (KOR) | 20 | 8
2 | Fu Haifeng (CHN); Cai Yun (CHN) | 22 | 21

Finals
1 | Markis Kido (INA); Hendra Setiawan (INA) | 12 | 21 | 21
2 | Fu Haifeng (CHN); Cai Yun (CHN) | 21 | 11 | 16
Third place
Lars Paaske (DEN); Jonas Rasmussen (DEN) | 21 | 18 | 17
Lee Jae-jin (KOR); Hwang Ji-man (KOR) | 13 | 21 | 21

=== Women's doubles ===
Quarterfinals
1 | Yang Wei (CHN); Zhang Jiewen (CHN) | 21 | 21 | 14
Miyuki Maeda (JPN); Satoko Suetsuna (JPN) | 8 | 23 | 21
4 | Lee Hyo-jung (KOR); Lee Kyung-won (KOR) | 21 | 21
Jiang Yanmei (SIN); Li Yujia (SIN) | 15 | 12
Cheng Wen-hsing (TPE); Chien Yu-chin (TPE) | 14 | 18
3 | Wei Yili (CHN); Zhang Yawen (CHN) | 21 | 21
Kumiko Ogura (JPN); Reiko Shiota (JPN) | 8 | 5
2 | Du Jing (CHN); Yu Yang (CHN) | 21 | 21

Semifinals
Miyuki Maeda (JPN); Satoko Suetsuna (JPN) | 20 | 15
4 | Lee Hyo-jung (KOR); Lee Kyung-won (KOR) | 22 | 21
3 | Wei Yili (CHN); Zhang Yawen (CHN) | 19 | 12
2 | Du Jing (CHN); Yu Yang (CHN) | 21 | 21

Finals
4 | Lee Hyo-jung (KOR); Lee Kyung-won (KOR) | 15 | 13
2 | Du Jing (CHN); Yu Yang (CHN) | 21 | 21
Third place
Miyuki Maeda (JPN); Satoko Suetsuna (JPN) | 17 | 10
3 | Wei Yili (CHN); Zhang Yawen (CHN) | 21 | 21

=== Mixed doubles ===
Quarterfinals
1 | Nova Widianto (INA); Liliyana Natsir (INA) | 21 | 21
Sudket Prapakamol (THA); Saralee Thoungthongkam (THA) | 13 | 19
4 | He Hanbin (CHN); Yu Yang (CHN) | 22 | 23
Robert Mateusiak (POL); Nadieżda Kostiuczyk (POL) | 20 | 21
Thomas Laybourn (DEN); Kamilla Rytter Juhl (DEN) | 17 | 21 | 17
3 | Flandy Limpele (INA); Vita Marissa (INA) | 21 | 15 | 21
Lee Yong-dae (KOR); Lee Hyo-jung (KOR) | 21 | 21
Nathan Robertson (GBR); Gail Emms (GBR) | 19 | 12

Semifinals
1 | Nova Widianto (INA); Liliyana Natsir (INA) | 15 | 21 | 23
4 | He Hanbin (CHN); Yu Yang (CHN) | 21 | 11 | 21
3 | Flandy Limpele (INA); Vita Marissa (INA) | 9 | 21 | 17
Lee Yong-dae (KOR); Lee Hyo-jung (KOR) | 21 | 12 | 21

Finals
1 | Nova Widianto (INA); Liliyana Natsir (INA) | 11 | 17
Lee Yong-dae (KOR); Lee Hyo-jung (KOR) | 21 | 21
Third place
4 | He Hanbin (CHN); Yu Yang (CHN) | 19 | 21 | 23
3 | Flandy Limpele (INA); Vita Marissa (INA) | 21 | 17 | 21
