= South Korea at the 2008 Summer Olympics =

- IOC code: KOR
- NOC: Korean Olympic Committee
- Website: www.sports.or.kr (in Korean and English)

in Beijing
- Competitors: 267 in 25 sports
- Flag bearers: Jang Sung-ho (opening); Jang Mi-ran (closing)
- Medals Ranked 7th: Gold 13 Silver 11 Bronze 8 Total 32

Summer Olympics appearances (overview)
- 1948; 1952; 1956; 1960; 1964; 1968; 1972; 1976; 1980; 1984; 1988; 1992; 1996; 2000; 2004; 2008; 2012; 2016; 2020; 2024; 2028

South Korea competed (as Korea) at the 2008 Summer Olympics in Beijing, China. This is a list of all of the South Korean athletes who qualified for the Olympics and their results. South Korea sent a delegation of 267 athletes to these games.

North and South Korea had initially intended to send a joint delegation to the Games, but were unable to agree on the details of its implementation. (See North Korea at the 2008 Summer Olympics.)

The South Korean contingent aimed for ten gold medals and to be ranked in the top ten in the games. However, they exceeded expectations and the nation was ranked 7th in gold medals, and 8th in total medals. The 13 gold medals won was the highest number of gold medals earned in its Olympic history.

== Medalists ==
Medal	Name	Sport	Event
Gold	Choi Min-ho	Judo	Men's 60 kg
Gold	Park Tae-hwan	Swimming	Men's 400 m freestyle
Gold	Joo Hyun-jung; Park Sung-hyun; Yun Ok-hee	Archery	Women's team
Gold	Im Dong-hyun; Lee Chang-hwan; Park Kyung-mo	Archery	Men's team
Gold	Jin Jong-oh	Shooting	Men's 50 m pistol
Gold	Sa Jae-hyouk	Weightlifting	Men's 77 kg
Gold	Jang Mi-ran	Weightlifting	Women's +75 kg
Gold	Lee Yong-dae; Lee Hyo-jung	Badminton	Mixed doubles
Gold	Lim Su-jeong	Taekwondo	Women's 57 kg
Gold	Son Tae-jin	Taekwondo	Men's 68 kg
Gold	Hwang Kyung-seon	Taekwondo	Women's 67 kg
Gold	Cha Dong-min	Taekwondo	Men's +80 kg
Gold	South Korea national baseball team: Ryu Hyun-jin; Han Ki-joo; Park Jin-man; Kwon Hyuk; Lee Taek-keun; Lee Dae-ho; Oh Seung-hwan; Bong Jung-keun; Ko Young-min; Lee Jong-wook; Jeong Keun-woo; Kim Min-jae; Jin Kab-yong; Lee Jin-young; Jang Won-sam; Song Seung-jun; Kim Kwang-hyun; Lee Yong-kyu; Kim Dong-joo; Kang Min-ho; Hyun-soo Kim; Lee Seung-yeop; Chong Tae-hyon; Yoon Suk-min	Baseball	Men's tournament
Silver	Jin Jong-oh	Shooting	Men's 10 m air pistol
Silver	Yoon Jin-hee	Weightlifting	Women's 53 kg
Silver	Wang Ki-chun	Judo	Men's 73 kg
Silver	Nam Hyun-hee	Fencing	Women's foil
Silver	Park Tae-hwan	Swimming	Men's 200 m freestyle
Silver	Kim Jae-bum	Judo	Men's 81 kg
Silver	Park Sung-hyun	Archery	Women's individual
Silver	Park Kyung-mo	Archery	Men's individual
Silver	Lee Hyo-jung; Lee Kyung-won	Badminton	Women's doubles
Silver	Yoo Won-chul	Gymnastics	Men's parallel bars
Silver	Im Jyoung-hwa	Weightlifting	Women's 48 kg
Bronze	Park Eun-chul	Wrestling	Men's Greco-Roman 55 kg
Bronze	Yun Ok-hee	Archery	Women's individual
Bronze	Jeong Gyeong-mi	Judo	Women's 78 kg
Bronze	Hwang Ji-man; Lee Jae-jin	Badminton	Men's doubles
Bronze	Dang Ye-seo; Kim Kyung-ah; Park Mi-young	Table tennis	Women's team
Bronze	Oh Sang-eun; Ryu Seung-min; Yoon Jae-young	Table tennis	Men's team
Bronze	Kim Jung-joo	Boxing	Welterweight
Bronze	South Korea women's national handball team: Oh Yong-ran; Kim On-a; Huh Soon-young; Song Hai-rim; Kim Nam-sun; Kim Cha-youn; Oh Seong-ok; Hong Jeong-ho; Park Chung-hee; Lee Min-hee; An Jung-hwa; Bae Min-hee; Choi Im-jeong; Moon Pil-hee	Handball	Women's tournament

== Archery ==
At the 2007 World Outdoor Target Championships, Korea's won the championship in both the men's and women's events. This qualified the nation to send full teams of three men and three women to the Olympics.

Men

Athlete	Event	Ranking round		Round of 64	Round of 32	Round of 16	Quarterfinals	Semifinals	Final / BM	
Athlete	Event	Score	Seed	Opposition Score	Opposition Score	Opposition Score	Opposition Score	Opposition Score	Opposition Score	Rank
Im Dong-hyun	Individual	670	8	Salem (QAT) (37); W 108–103	Johnson (USA) (40); W 115–106	Wunderle (USA) (41); L 111–113	Did not advance			
Lee Chang-hwan	Individual	669	10	Jiang L (CHN) (55); W 112–108	Ergin (TUR) (23); W 117–109 OR	Cheng C S (MAS) (26); L 105 (18)–105 (19)	Did not advance			
Park Kyung-mo	Individual	676	4	Trainini (BRA) (61); W 116–99	Kuo C-w (TPE) (29); W 111–110	Dobrowolski (POL) (13); W 113–105	Stevens (CUB) (28); W 108 (19)–108 (17)	Serrano (MEX) (1); W 115–112	Ruban (UKR) (3); L 112–113	2nd place, silver medalist(s)
Im Dong-hyun; Lee Chang-hwan; Park Kyung-mo	Team	2015	1	—N/a			Poland (8); W 224–222	China (12); W 221–218	Italy (6); W 227–225	1st place, gold medalist(s)

Women

Athlete	Event	Ranking round		Round of 64	Round of 32	Round of 16	Quarterfinals	Semifinals	Final / BM	
Athlete	Event	Score	Seed	Opposition Score	Opposition Score	Opposition Score	Opposition Score	Opposition Score	Opposition Score	Rank
Joo Hyun-jung	Individual	664	3	Romero (COL) (30); W 108–98	Valeeva (ITA) (62); W 110–108	Schuh (FRA) (14); W 109–104	Zhang Jj (CHN) (27); L 101–106	Did not advance		
Park Sung-hyun	Individual	673	1	Abbouda (MAR) (64); W 112–80	Hitzler (GER) (33); W 112–107	Romantzi (GRE) (49); W 115–103 OR	Hayakawa (JPN) (9); W 112–103	Kwon U-S (PRK) (5); W 109–106	Zhang Jj (CHN) (27); L 109–110	2nd place, silver medalist(s)
Yun Ok-hee	Individual	667	2	Kamaltdinova (TJK) (63); W 109–102	Beaudet (CAN) (34); W 114–107	Chen L (CHN) (15); W 113–103	Lorig (USA) (26); W 111–105	Zhang Jj (CHN) (27); L 109–115	Kwon U-S (PRK) (5); W 109–106	3rd place, bronze medalist(s)
Joo Hyun-jung; Park Sung-hyun; Yun Ok-hee	Team	2004	1	—N/a			Italy (9); W 231–217	France (5); W 213–184	China (3); W 224–215	1st place, gold medalist(s)

== Athletics ==
Key

- Note–Ranks given for track events are within the athlete's heat only
- Q = Qualified for the next round
- q = Qualified for the next round as a fastest loser or, in field events, by position without achieving the qualifying target
- NR = National record
- N/A = Round not applicable for the event
- Bye = Athlete not required to compete in round

Men
Track & road events

Athlete	Event	Heat		Quarterfinal		Semifinal		Final	
Athlete	Event	Result	Rank	Result	Rank	Result	Rank	Result	Rank
Lee Jung-joon	110 m hurdles	13.65	5 q	13.55 NR	6	Did not advance			
Kim Yi-yong	Marathon	—N/a						2:23:57	50
Lee Bong-ju	Marathon	—N/a						2:17:56	28
Lee Myong-seung	Marathon	—N/a						2:14:37	18
Kim Hyun-sub	20 km walk	—N/a						1:22:57	23
Park Chil-sung	20 km walk	—N/a						1:25:07	33
Kim Dong-young	50 km walk	—N/a						4:02:32	31

Field events

Athlete	Event	Qualification		Final	
Athlete	Event	Distance	Position	Distance	Position
Kim Deok-hyeon	Triple jump	16.88	18	Did not advance	
Kim Yoo-suk	Pole vault	NM	—	Did not advance	
Park Jae-myong	Javelin throw	76.63	17	Did not advance	

Women
Track & road events

Athlete	Event	Final	
Athlete	Event	Result	Rank
Chae Eun-hee	Marathon	2:38:52	53
Lee Eun-jung	Marathon	2:33:07	25
Lee Sun-young	Marathon	2:43:23	56
Kim Mi-jung	20 km walk	1:33:55	29

Field events

Athlete	Event	Qualification		Final	
Athlete	Event	Distance	Position	Distance	Position
Jung Soon-ok	Long jump	6.33	14	Did not advance	
Lee Mi-young	Shot put	15.10	33	Did not advance	
Kim Kyung-ae	Javelin throw	53.13	46	Did not advance	

== Badminton ==
Men

Athlete	Event	Round of 64	Round of 32	Round of 16	Quarterfinal	Semifinal	Final / BM	
Athlete	Event	Opposition Score	Opposition Score	Opposition Score	Opposition Score	Opposition Score	Opposition Score	Rank
Lee Hyun-il	Singles	Bye	Jonassen (DEN); W 15–21, 21–14, 21–19	Zwiebler (GER); W 21–13, 21–11	Bao Cl (CHN); W 23–21, 21–11	Lee C W (MAS); L 18–21, 21–13, 13–21	Chen J (CHN); L 16–21, 21–12, 14–21	4
Park Sung-hwan	Singles	Dabeka (CAN); W 21–11, 21–11	Ekiring (UGA); W 21–5, 21–8	Lin D (CHN); L 8–21, 11–21	Did not advance			
Hwang Ji-man; Lee Jae-jin	Doubles	—N/a		Choong T F / Lee W W (MAS); W 20–22, 21–13, 21–16	Masuda / Ohtsuka (JPN); W 21–12, 18–21, 21–9	Cai Y / Fu Hf (CHN); L 20–22, 8–21	Paaske / Rasmussen (DEN); W 13–21, 21–18, 21–17	3rd place, bronze medalist(s)
Jung Jae-sung; Lee Yong-dae	Doubles	—N/a		Paaske / Rasmussen (DEN); L 16–21, 19–21	Did not advance			

Women

Athlete	Event	Round of 64	Round of 32	Round of 16	Quarterfinal	Semifinal	Final / BM	
Athlete	Event	Opposition Score	Opposition Score	Opposition Score	Opposition Score	Opposition Score	Opposition Score	Rank
Jun Jae-youn	Singles	Augustyn (POL); W 21–15, 21–5	Magee (IRL); W 21–12, 21–14	Zhang N (CHN); L 11–21, 12–21	Did not advance			
Ha Jung-eun; Kim Min-jung	Doubles	—N/a		Du J / Yu Y (CHN); L 11–21, 21–16, 15–21	Did not advance			
Lee Hyo-jung; Lee Kyung-won	Doubles	—N/a		Chin / Wong (MAS); W 21–14, 21–19	Jiang Ym / Li Yj (SIN); W 21–15, 21–12	Maeda / Suetsuna (JPN); W 22–20, 21–15	Du J / Yu Y (CHN)} L 15–21, 13–21	2nd place, silver medalist(s)

Mixed

Athlete	Event	Round of 16	Quarterfinal	Semifinal	Final / BM	
Athlete	Event	Opposition Score	Opposition Score	Opposition Score	Opposition Score	Rank
Han Sang-hoon; Hwang Yu-mi	Doubles	Widianto / Natsir (INA); L 21–23, 19–21	Did not advance			
Lee Hyo-jung; Lee Yong-dae	Doubles	Cooper / Flavell (NZL); W 21–12, 21–11	Robertson / Emms (GBR); W 21–19, 21–12	Limpele / Marissa (INA); W 21–9, 12–21, 21–17	Widianto / Natsir (INA); W 21–11, 21–17	1st place, gold medalist(s)

== Baseball ==
Korea placed second in the Final Qualifying Tournament, earning the South Korea national baseball team a qualification spot in baseball. 2008 will be Korea's third appearance in the Olympic baseball tournament; the team took the bronze medal in 2000 and placed eighth in 1996. On Korea's third appearance, they won the gold.

Group Stage

- August 13 South Korea 8 – 7 United States
- August 14 South Korea 0 – 0 China (Postponed due to rain)
- August 15 South Korea 1 – 0 Canada
- August 16 South Korea 5 – 3 Japan
- August 17 South Korea 1 – 0 China
- August 18 South Korea 9 – 8 Chinese Taipei
- August 19 South Korea 7 – 4 Cuba
- August 20 South Korea 10 – 0 Netherlands

Team	G	W	L	RS	RA	WIN%	GB	Tiebreaker
South Korea	7	7	0	41	22	100%	-	-
Cuba	7	6	1	52	23	85.7%	1	-
United States	7	5	2	40	22	71.4%	2	-
Japan	7	4	3	30	14	57.1%	3	-
Chinese Taipei	7	2	5	29	33	28.6%	5	1-0
Canada	7	2	5	29	20	28.6%	5	0-1
Netherlands	7	1	6	9	50	14.3%	6	1-0
China	7	1	6	14	60	14.3%	6	0-1

Semifinals

- August 22 South Korea 6 – 2 Japan

Gold medal match

- August 23 (gold) South Korea 3 – 2 Cuba

== Basketball ==
=== Women's tournament ===
Korea's women's basketball team qualified for the Olympics by winning the FIBA Asia Championship for Women 2007. It will be the women's team's sixth Olympic appearance.

Roster

The following is the South Korea roster in the women's basketball tournament of the 2008 Summer Olympics.

South Korea women's national basketball team – 2008 Summer Olympics roster
Players
Coaches

Pos.	No.	Name	Age – Date of birth	Height	Club	Ctr.
G	4	Kim Yeong-ok	34 – March 4, 1974	5 ft 6 in (1.68 m)	Yongin Samsung Life Bichumi	(South Korea)
G	5	Lee Mi-sun	29 – February 19, 1979	5 ft 9 in (1.75 m)	Yongin Samsung Life Bichumi	(South Korea)
G	6	Choi Youn-ah	22 – October 24, 1985	5 ft 7 in (1.7 m)	Yongin Samsung Life Bichumi	(South Korea)
F	7	Jin Mi-jung	30 – January 28, 1978	5 ft 8 in (1.73 m)	Ansan Shinhan Bank S-Birds	(South Korea)
C	8	Lee Jong-ae	33 – March 18, 1975	6 ft 2 in (1.88 m)	Yongin Samsung Life Bichumi	(South Korea)
C	9	Jung Sun-min (C)	33 – October 12, 1974	6 ft 1 in (1.85 m)	Ansan Shinhan Bank S-Birds	(South Korea)
F	10	Beon Yeon-ha	28 – March 7, 1980	5 ft 11 in (1.8 m)	Yongin Samsung Life Bichumi	(South Korea)
F	11	Park Jung-eun	31 – January 14, 1977	5 ft 11 in (1.8 m)	Yongin Samsung Life Bichumi	(South Korea)
C	12	Ha Eun-joo	24 – September 25, 1983	6 ft 8 in (2.03 m)	Ansan Shinhan Bank S-Birds	(South Korea)
F	13	Kim Jung-eun	20 – September 7, 1987	5 ft 11 in (1.8 m)	Bucheon Shinsegae Coolcat	(South Korea)
C	14	Kim Kwe-ryong	28 – December 17, 1979	6 ft 3 in (1.91 m)	Chuncheon Woori Bank Hansae	(South Korea)
C	15	Sin Jung-ja	27 – December 11, 1980	6 ft 0 in (1.83 m)	Guri Kdb Life Winnus	(South Korea)

Head coach

- (South Korea) Jung Duk-hwa

Legend

- (C) Team captain
- Club – describes last
  club before the tournament
- Age – describes age
  on August 9, 2008

Group play

Pos	Team	Pld	W	L	PF	PA	PD	Pts	Qualification
1	Australia	5	5	0	424	319	+105	10	Quarterfinals
2	Russia	5	4	1	339	333	+6	9	Quarterfinals
3	Belarus	5	2	3	324	332	−8	7 (Note: Head-to-head record: Belarus 1–0 South Korea)	Quarterfinals
4	South Korea	5	2	3	327	360	−33	7	Quarterfinals
5	Latvia	5	1	4	334	387	−53	6 (Note: Head-to-head record: Latvia 1–0 Brazil)	
6	Brazil	5	1	4	337	354	−17	6	

Source: FIBA archive
Rules for classification: 1) points; 2) head-to-head points; 3) head-to-head goal average; 4) head-to-head number of points scored.
Notes:

9 August 2008
16:45

Report

South Korea	68–62 (OT)	Brazil
Scoring by quarter: 13–14, 13–14, 15–15, 14–12, Overtime: 13–7
Pts: Beon 19, Choi 19; Rebs: Jung 8 Asts: Jung 5		Pts: Santos 13; Rebs: Nascimento 12; Asts: Jacintho 3

Wukesong Indoor Stadium, Beijing
Attendance: 11,083
Referees: Fabio Facchini (ITA)

11 August 2008
14:30

Report

South Korea	72–77	Russia
Scoring by quarter: 15–24, 20–13, 24–21, 13–19
Pts: Choi 13; Rebs: Sin 3 Asts: Jung 6		Pts: Korstin, Shchegoleva 13; Rebs: Osipova 9 Asts: Rakhmatulina 5

Wukesong Indoor Stadium, Beijing
Attendance: 11,083
Referees: Petr Sudek (SVK)

13 August 2008
20:00

Report

Australia	90–62	South Korea
Scoring by quarter: 23–14, 24–19, 26–17, 17–12
Pts: Taylor, Batkovic 18; Rebs: Batkovic 10; Asts: Harrower 5		Pts: Beon 20; Rebs: seven players 2 Asts: Lee 5

Wukesong Indoor Stadium, Beijing
Attendance: 11,083
Referees: Romualdas Brazauskas (LTU)

15 August 2008
22:15

Report

South Korea	53–63	Belarus
Scoring by quarter: 15–12, 13–21, 9–17, 16–13
Pts: Lee, Jung 10; Rebs: Lee, Beon 6 Asts: Beon 3		Pts: Snytsina 15; Rebs: Leuchanka 14; Asts: Maarchanka 5

Wukesong Indoor Stadium, Beijing
Attendance: 11,083
Referees: Nikolaos Pitsilkas (GRE)

17 August 2008
14:30

Report

South Korea	72–68	Latvia
Scoring by quarter: 20–22, 22–13, 18–9, 12–24
Pts: Park 17; Rebs: Lee 10; Asts: Lee 4		Pts: Jēkabsone-Žogota 22; Rebs: Tamane 11; Asts: Jēkabsone-Žogota 5

Wukesong Indoor Stadium, Beijing
Attendance: 11,083
Referees: Jose Carreon (PUR)

Quarterfinals

19 August 2008
20:00

Report

United States	104–60	South Korea
Scoring by quarter: 25–21, 26–9, 26–9, 27–21
Pts: Fowles 26; Rebs: Fowles 14; Asts: Augustus 3		Pts: Kim 14; Rebs: Kim 5 Asts: Park 7

Wukesong Indoor Stadium, Beijing
Attendance: 11,083
Referees: Stephen Seibel (USA)

== Boxing ==
Korea qualified five boxers for the Olympic boxing tournament. Lee, Baik, and Kim each earned their spots at the first Asian qualifying tournament. Han and Cho joined them as Olympic qualifiers at the second qualifying tournament.

Athlete	Event	Round of 32	Round of 16	Quarterfinals	Semifinals	Final	
Athlete	Event	Opposition Result	Opposition Result	Opposition Result	Opposition Result	Opposition Result	Rank
Lee Ok-sung	Flyweight	Warren (USA); W 9–8	Cherif (TUN); L 5–11	Did not advance			
Han Soon-chul	Bantamweight	Bye	Manzanilla (VEN); L 6–17	Did not advance			
Baik Jong-sub	Lightweight	Bye	Sayota (THA); W 10–4	Javakhyan (ARM); L WO	Did not advance		
Kim Jung-joo	Welterweight	Culcay-Keth (GER); W 11^{+}–11	Jackson (ISV); W 10–0	Andrade (USA); W 11–9	Sarsekbayev (KAZ); L 6–10	Did not advance	3rd place, bronze medalist(s)
Cho Deok-jin	Middleweight	Chomphuphuang (THA); L 3–9	Did not advance				

== Canoeing ==
=== Sprint ===
Athlete	Event	Heats		Semifinals		Final	
Athlete	Event	Time	Rank	Time	Rank	Time	Rank
Lee Sun-ja	Women's K-1 500 m	1:58.140	8	Did not advance			

Qualification Legend: Q = Qualify directly to final; q = Qualify to semi-final

== Cycling ==
=== Road ===
Athlete	Event	Time	Rank
Park Sung-baek	Men's road race	7:03:04	88
Gu Sun-geun	Women's road race	3:45:59	58
Son Hee-jung	Women's road race	Did not finish	

=== Track ===
Omnium

Athlete	Event	Points	Laps	Rank
Lee Min-hye	Women's points race	−40	−2	19

== Diving ==
Men

Athlete	Events	Preliminaries		Semifinals		Final	
Athlete	Events	Points	Rank	Points	Rank	Points	Rank
Son Seong-cheol	3 m springboard	353.35	29	Did not advance			

== Equestrian ==
=== Dressage ===
Athlete	Horse	Event	Grand Prix		Grand Prix Special		Grand Prix Freestyle		Overall	
Athlete	Horse	Event	Score	Rank	Score	Rank	Score	Rank	Score	Rank
Choi Jun-sang	Cinque Cento	Individual	57.333	46	Did not advance					

== Fencing ==
Men

Athlete	Event	Round of 64	Round of 32	Round of 16	Quarterfinal	Semifinal	Final / BM	
Athlete	Event	Opposition Score	Opposition Score	Opposition Score	Opposition Score	Opposition Score	Opposition Score	Rank
Jung Jin-sun	Individual épée	Bye	Li Gj (CHN); W 15–6	Chumak (UKR); W 15–6	Jeannet (FRA); L 11–15	Did not advance		
Kim Seung-gu	Individual épée	Maduma (RSA); W 15–12	Imre (HUN); L 14–15	Did not advance				
Kim Won-jin	Individual épée	Bye	Abajo (ESP); L 14–15	Did not advance				
Jung Jin-sun; Kim Seung-gu; Kim Won-Jin	Team épée	—N/a			Italy; L 37–45	Classification semi-final Venezuela; L 38–45	7th place final Ukraine; L 39–41	8
Choi Byung-chul	Individual foil	—N/a	Al-Hamadi (QAT); W 15–3	Ota (JPN); L 14–15	Did not advance			
Oh Eun-seok	Individual sabre	Bye	Lapkes (BLR); W 15–8	Lopez (FRA); L 11–15	Did not advance			

Women

Athlete	Event	Round of 64	Round of 32	Round of 16	Quarterfinal	Semifinal	Final / BM	
Athlete	Event	Opposition Score	Opposition Score	Opposition Score	Opposition Score	Opposition Score	Opposition Score	Rank
Jung Hyo-jung	Individual épée	—N/a	Hurley (USA); W 15–6	Heidemann (GER); L 5–12	Did not advance			
Jung Gil-ok	Individual foil	Bye	Sugawara (JPN); L 9–11	Did not advance				
Nam Hyun-hee	Individual foil	Bye	Shaban (EGY); W 15–6	Varga (HUN); W 15–4	Sugawara (JPN); W 15–10	Trillini (ITA); W 15-10	Vezzali (ITA); L 5–6	2nd place, silver medalist(s)
Kim Keum-hwa	Individual sabre	Bye	Vergne (FRA); W 15–14	Tan (CHN); L 8–15	Did not advance			
Lee Shin-mi	Individual sabre	Bye	Ovtchinnikova (CAN); L 13–15	Did not advance				

== Field hockey ==
=== Men's tournament ===
Roster

The following is the South Korean roster in the men's field hockey tournament of the 2008 Summer Olympics.

Head Coach: Cho Myung-jun

1. Ko Dong-sik (GK)
2. Kim Byung-hoon
3. Kim Chul
5. Kim Yong-bae
6. Lee Nam-yong
7. Seo Jong-ho (c)
8. Kang Seong-jung
9. Yoon Sung-hoon
10. You Hyo-sik
11. Yeo Woon-kon
15. Cha Jong-bok
16. Lee Myung-ho (GK)
17. Hong Eun-seong
19. Kang Moon-kweon
22. Kim Sam-seok
25. Jang Jong-hyun

Reserve:

12. Lee Jae-won
14. Hyun Hye-sung

Group play

Pos	Team	Pld	W	D	L	GF	GA	GD	Pts	Qualification
1	Spain	5	4	0	1	9	5	+4	12	Semi-finals
2	Germany	5	3	2	0	12	6	+6	11	Semi-finals
3	South Korea	5	2	1	2	13	11	+2	7	Fifth place game
4	New Zealand	5	2	1	2	10	9	+1	7	Seventh place game
5	Belgium	5	1	1	3	9	13	−4	4	Ninth place game
6	China (H)	5	0	1	4	7	16	−9	1	Eleventh place game

(H) Hosts

11 August 2008
18:00

South Korea	1–3	New Zealand
Lee Nam-yong 12'	Report	H. Shaw 43', 57', 64'

Umpires:
David Gentles (AUS)
Andy Mair (GBR)

13 August 2008
10:30

China	2–5	South Korea
Na Yubo 6'; Song Yi 8'	Report	Seo Jong-ho 13'; Jang Jong-hyun 35+', 55', 57'; Kang Seong-jung 67'

Umpires:
Amarjit Singh (MAS)
Henrik Ehlers (DEN)

15 August 2008
20:30

South Korea	3–3	Germany
Yeo Woon-kon 5'; Jang Jong-hyun 46'; Seo Jong-ho 52'	Report	Witte 17'; Witthaus 40'; C. Zeller 47'

Umpires:
John Wright (RSA)
Satinder Kumar (IND)

17 August 2008
10:30

South Korea	3–1	Belgium
You Hyo-sik 46', 51'; Jang Jong-hyun 50'	Report	Dekeyser 20'

Umpires:
Rob ten Cate (NED)
Satinder Kumar (IND)

19 August 2008
18:30

South Korea	1–2	Spain
Yoon Sung-hoon 69'	Report	Freixa 12', 53'

Umpires:
Henrik Ehlers (DEN)
John Wright (USA)

Classification match for 5th/6th place

23 August 2008
11:00

South Korea	2–5	Great Britain
Jang Jong-hyun 48'; Hyun Hye-sung 67'	Report	Middleton 44'; Jackson 49'; Clarke 54', 63'; Kirkham 70'

Umpires:
Murray Grime (AUS)
Roel van Eert (NED)

=== Women's tournament ===
Roster

The following is the South Korean roster in the women's field hockey tournament of the 2008 Summer Olympics.

Head Coach: Han Jin-soo

1. Moon Young-hui (GK)
3. Cho Hye-sook
5. Kim Young-ran
7. Lee Seon-ok (c)
8. Kim Jung-hee
9. Park Mi-hyun
10. Kim Jin-kyoung
11. Kim Mi-seon
12. Kim Jong-eun
14. Eum Mi-young
15. Gim Sung-hee
17. Seo Hye-jin
18. Park Jeong-sook
19. Kim Eun-sil
22. Kim Da-rae
23. Han Hye-lyoung

Reserve:

2. Lim Seon-mee
16. Lee Soo-jin (GK)

Group play

Team	Pld	W	D	L	GF	GA	GD	Pts	Qualification
Netherlands	5	5	0	0	14	3	+11	15	Advanced to semifinals
China	5	3	1	1	14	4	+10	10	Advanced to semifinals
Australia	5	3	1	1	17	9	+8	10	
Spain	5	2	0	3	4	12	−8	6	
South Korea	5	1	0	4	13	18	−5	3	
South Africa	5	0	0	5	2	18	−16	0	

10 August 2008
18:00

Australia	5–4	South Korea
Liddelow 25', 50'; Hudson 47'; Young 56'; Eastham 65'	Report	Kim Mi-sun 18'; Kim Da-rae 27'; Gim Sung-hee 32'; Park Mi-hyun 34'

Umpires:
Soledad Iparruguirre (ARG)
Stella Bartlema (NED)

12 August 2008
20:30

Netherlands	3–2	South Korea
Paumen 3', 55'; Schopman 7'	Report	Lee Seon-ok 4', 39'

Umpires:
Julie Ashton-Lucy (AUS)
Ute Conen (GER)

14 August 2008
18:00

Spain	2–1	South Korea
Camón 8'; Sanchez 22'	Report	Kim Jong-eun 37'

Umpires:
Anne McRae (GBR)
Sarah Garnett (NZL)

16 August 2008
18:30

South Korea	1–6	China
Lee Seon-ok 53'	Report	Tang Chunling 30', 33', 41'; Fu Baorong 39', 40', 64'

Umpires:
Julie Ashton-Lucy (AUS)
Carolina de la Fuente (ARG)

18 August 2008
10:30

South Korea	5–2	South Africa
Gim Sung-hee 6'; Lee Seon-ok 23', 29'; Park Mi-hyun 32'; Kim Eun-sil 58'	Report	Hector 51'; Vida Ryan 66'

Umpires:
Stella Bartlema (NED)
Carol Metchette (IRL)

Classification match for 9th/10th place

20 August 2008
08:30

South Korea	2–1	Japan
Park Jeong-sook 12', 49'	Report	Komazawa 43'

Umpires:
Gina Spitaleri (ITA)
Lisa Roach (AUS)

== Football (soccer) ==
=== Men's tournament ===
Roster

The following is the South Korea squad in the men's football tournament of the 2008 Summer Olympics.

Head coach: Park Sung-hwa

No.	Pos.	Player	Date of birth (age)	Caps	Goals	Club
1	GK	Jung Sung-ryong	4 January 1985 (aged 23)	0	0	(Korea Football Association) Seongnam Ilhwa Chunma
2	DF	Shin Kwang-hoon	18 March 1987 (aged 21)	0	0	(Korea Football Association) Pohang Steelers
3	DF	Kim Dong-jin*	29 January 1982 (aged 26)	36	2	(Russian Football Union) Zenit St. Petersburg
4	DF	Kang Min-soo	14 February 1986 (aged 22)	0	0	(Korea Football Association) Jeonbuk Hyundai Motors
5	DF	Kim Chang-soo	12 September 1985 (aged 22)	0	0	(Korea Football Association) Busan IPark
6	DF	Kim Jin-kyu (c)	16 February 1985 (aged 23)	25	3	(Korea Football Association) FC Seoul
7	MF	Oh Jang-eun	24 July 1985 (aged 23)	0	0	(Korea Football Association) Ulsan Hyundai
8	MF	Kim Jung-woo*	9 May 1982 (aged 26)	0	0	(Korea Football Association) Seongnam Ilhwa Chunma
9	FW	Shin Young-rok	27 March 1987 (aged 21)	0	0	(Korea Football Association) Suwon Samsung Bluewings
10	FW	Park Chu-young	10 July 1985 (aged 23)	19	5	(Korea Football Association) FC Seoul
11	MF	Lee Chung-yong	2 July 1988 (aged 20)	0	0	(Korea Football Association) FC Seoul
12	MF	Ki Sung-yueng	24 January 1989 (aged 19)	0	0	(Korea Football Association) FC Seoul
13	MF	Kim Seung-yong	14 March 1985 (aged 23)	0	0	(Korea Football Association) Gwangju Sangmu
14	MF	Baek Ji-hoon	28 February 1985 (aged 23)	12	0	(Korea Football Association) Suwon Samsung Bluewings
15	DF	Kim Kun-hoan	12 August 1986 (aged 21)	0	0	(Korea Football Association) Kyung Hee University
16	FW	Cho Young-cheol	31 May 1989 (aged 19)	0	0	(Japan Football Association) Yokohama FC
17	FW	Lee Keun-ho	11 April 1985 (aged 23)	0	0	(Korea Football Association) Daegu FC
18	GK	Song Yoo-geol	16 February 1985 (aged 23)	0	0	(Korea Football Association) Incheon United

* Over-aged player.

Group play

Pos	Team	Pld	W	D	L	GF	GA	GD	Pts	Qualification
1	Italy	3	2	1	0	6	0	+6	7	Qualified for the quarterfinals
2	Cameroon	3	1	2	0	2	1	+1	5	Qualified for the quarterfinals
3	South Korea	3	1	1	1	2	4	−2	4	
4	Honduras	3	0	0	3	0	5	−5	0	

7 August 2008
19:45

South Korea	1–1	Cameroon
Park Chu-young 68'	Report	Mandjeck 81'

Qinhuangdao Olympic Sports Center Stadium, Qinhuangdao
Attendance: 21,943
Referee: Jair Marrufo (United States)
10 August 2008
19:45

Italy	3–0	South Korea
Rossi 15'; Rocchi 32'; Montolivo 90'	Report

Qinhuangdao Olympic Sports Center Stadium, Qinhuangdao
Attendance: 29,455
Referee: Thomas Einwaller (Austria)
13 August 2008
17:00

South Korea	1–0	Honduras
Kim Dong-jin 23'	Report

Shanghai Stadium, Shanghai
Attendance: 34,160
Referee: Michael Hester (New Zealand)

== Gymnastics ==
=== Artistic ===
Men
Team

Athlete	Event	Qualification								Final							
Athlete	Event	Apparatus						Total	Rank	Apparatus						Total	Rank
Athlete	Event	F	PH	R	V	PB	HB	Total	Rank	F	PH	R	V	PB	HB	Total	Rank
Kim Dae-eun	Team	15.500	14.725	15.450	16.050	16.050	14.625	92.400	3 Q	15.625	—N/a	15.275	15.950	15.925	14.400	—N/a	
Kim Ji-hoon	Team	14.975	15.175 Q	—N/a	15.650	—N/a	14.525	—N/a		—N/a	14.850	—N/a			15.450	—N/a	
Kim Seung-il	Team	14.975	14.550	14.325	15.650	15.325	12.175	87.000	34	Did not compete							
Kim Soo-myun	Team	15.575	13.800	14.175	16.025	15.350	14.975	89.900	18*	15.825	14.675	—N/a	15.925	—N/a	15.175	—N/a	
Yang Tae-young	Team	13.850	15.000	14.875	16.000	16.100 Q	13.475	89.300	22 Q	14.900	13.525	14.750	15.350	15.450	—N/a		
Yoo Won-chul	Team	—N/a		15.575	—N/a	16.150 Q	—N/a			—N/a		15.475	—N/a	15.850	—N/a		
Total	Team	61.025	59.450	60.225	63.725	63.650	57.600	365.675	4 Q	46.350	43.050	45.500	47.225	47.225	45.025	274.375	5

* Kim Soo-Myun withdrew from the individual all-around due to injury in the team event, and was replaced by Yang Tae-Young.

Individual finals

Athlete	Event	Apparatus						Total	Rank
Athlete	Event	F	PH	R	V	PB	HB	Total	Rank
Kim Dae-eun	All-around	15.225	13.650	15.400	15.625	16.000	14.875	90.775	11
Kim Ji-hoon	Pommel horse	—N/a	15.175	—N/a				15.175	6
Yang Tae-young	All-around	15.225	14.300	14.900	16.075	16.350	14.750	91.600	8
Yang Tae-young	Parallel bars	—N/a				15.650	—N/a	15.650	7
Yoo Won-chul	Parallel bars	—N/a				16.250	—N/a	16.250	2nd place, silver medalist(s)

Women

Athlete	Event	Qualification						Final					
Athlete	Event	Apparatus				Total	Rank	Apparatus				Total	Rank
Athlete	Event	F	V	UB	BB	Total	Rank	F	V	UB	BB	Total	Rank
Jo Hyun-joo	All-around	13.375	14.125	11.875	13.400	52.775	58	Did not advance					

=== Rhythmic ===
South Korea qualified one woman in rhythmic gymnastics.

Athlete	Event	Qualification						Final					
Athlete	Event	Rope	Hoop	Clubs	Ribbon	Total	Rank	Rope	Hoop	Clubs	Ribbon	Total	Rank
Shin Soo-ji	Individual	16.325	16.375	16.600	16.850	66.150	12	Did not advance					

== Handball ==
=== Men's tournament ===
Roster

The following is the South Korea roster in the women's handball tournament of the 2008 Summer Olympics.

Head coach: Kim Tae-hoon

No.	Pos.	Name	Date of birth (age)	Height	App.	Goals	Club
1	GK	Han Kyung-tai	11 April 1975 (aged 33)	1.91 m			(Switzerland) TSV St. Otmar
2	CB	Jeong Yi-kyeong	28 February 1985 (aged 23)	1.88 m			(South Korea) Doosan
6	LW	Kim Tea-wan	15 February 1980 (aged 28)	1.83 m			(South Korea) Chungnam
7	RW	Jung Su-young	17 October 1985 (aged 22)	1.84 m			(South Korea) HC Korosa
8	P	Park Jung-gyu	2 November 1983 (aged 24)	1.90 m			(South Korea) Doosan
10	P	Park Chan-yong	1 January 1980 (aged 28)	1.89 m			(South Korea) Incheon DTC
13	RB	Yoon Kyung-shin	7 July 1973 (aged 35)	2.03 m			(South Korea) Doosan
14	RW	Cho Chi-hyo	6 December 1970 (aged 37)	1.92 m			(Germany) HBW Balingen-Weilstetten
15	LW	Lee Tea-young	25 November 1977 (aged 30)	1.74 m			(South Korea) Incheon DTC
16	GK	Kang Il-koo	26 April 1976 (aged 32)	1.84 m			(South Korea) Incheon DTC
17	RB	Lee Jae-woo	28 September 1979 (aged 28)	1.82 m			(Japan) Daido Steel
18	LB	Paek Won-chul	10 January 1977 (aged 31)	1.80 m			(Japan) Daido Steel
20	CB	Ko Kyung-soo	5 February 1985 (aged 23)	1.82 m			(South Korea) Chungnam
23	LB	Yoon Kyung-min	31 October 1979 (aged 28)	1.93 m			(South Korea) Chungnam

Group play

Team	Pld	W	D	L	GF	GA	GD	Pts	Qualification
South Korea	5	3	0	2	122	129	−7	6	Qualified for the quarterfinals
Denmark	5	2	2	1	137	131	+6	6	Qualified for the quarterfinals
Iceland	5	2	2	1	151	146	+5	6	Qualified for the quarterfinals
Russia	5	2	1	2	136	131	+5	5	Qualified for the quarterfinals
Germany	5	2	1	2	126	130	−4	5	
Egypt	5	0	2	3	127	132	−5	2	

10 August 2008; 15:45	Germany	27 – 23	South Korea	Olympic Sports Centre Gymnasium; Referees: Canbro, Claesson (SWE)
10 August 2008; 15:45	Kraus 7	(10–13)	Cho Chi-hyo 7	Olympic Sports Centre Gymnasium; Referees: Canbro, Claesson (SWE)
10 August 2008; 15:45	3× (yellow card) 3× (suspension)	Report	3× (yellow card) 3× (suspension)	Olympic Sports Centre Gymnasium; Referees: Canbro, Claesson (SWE)

12 August 2008; 19:00	South Korea	31 – 30	Denmark	Olympic Sports Centre Gymnasium; Referees: Licis, Stolarovs (LAT)
12 August 2008; 19:00	Jung Su-young 9	(13–14)	Nøddesbo 11	Olympic Sports Centre Gymnasium; Referees: Licis, Stolarovs (LAT)
12 August 2008; 19:00	2× (yellow card) 1× (suspension)	Report	3× (yellow card) 2× (suspension)	Olympic Sports Centre Gymnasium; Referees: Licis, Stolarovs (LAT)

14 August 2008; 14:00	South Korea	22 – 21	Iceland	Olympic Sports Centre Gymnasium; Referees: Baum, Goralczyk (POL)
14 August 2008; 14:00	Yoon Kyung-shin 6	(10–9)	Geirsson, Sigurðsson 5	Olympic Sports Centre Gymnasium; Referees: Baum, Goralczyk (POL)
14 August 2008; 14:00	3× (yellow card) 1× (suspension)	Report	4× (yellow card) 3× (suspension)	Olympic Sports Centre Gymnasium; Referees: Baum, Goralczyk (POL)

16 August 2008; 10:45	Egypt	22 – 24	South Korea	Olympic Sports Centre Gymnasium; Referees: Breto, Huelin (ESP)
16 August 2008; 10:45	Abd Elsalam 8	(11–8)	Paek Won-chul 7	Olympic Sports Centre Gymnasium; Referees: Breto, Huelin (ESP)
16 August 2008; 10:45	3× (yellow card) 6× (suspension) 1× (red card)	Report	3× (yellow card) 3× (suspension)	Olympic Sports Centre Gymnasium; Referees: Breto, Huelin (ESP)

18 August 2008; 14:00	Russia	29 – 22	South Korea	Olympic Sports Centre Gymnasium; Referees: Bord, Buy (FRA)
18 August 2008; 14:00	Rastvortsev 6	(17–12)	Yoon Kyung-shin 7	Olympic Sports Centre Gymnasium; Referees: Bord, Buy (FRA)
18 August 2008; 14:00	3× (yellow card) 4× (suspension)	Report	1× (yellow card) 1× (suspension)	Olympic Sports Centre Gymnasium; Referees: Bord, Buy (FRA)

Quarterfinal

20 August 2008; 20:15	South Korea	24 – 29	Spain	Olympic Sports Centre Gymnasium; Referees: Gjeding, Hansen (DEN)
20 August 2008; 20:15	Jeong Yi-kyeong 7	(13–14)	Rocas 8	Olympic Sports Centre Gymnasium; Referees: Gjeding, Hansen (DEN)
20 August 2008; 20:15	3× (yellow card) 3× (suspension)	Report	2× (yellow card) 5× (suspension)	Olympic Sports Centre Gymnasium; Referees: Gjeding, Hansen (DEN)

Classification semifinal

22 August 2008; 14:15	Poland	29 – 26	South Korea	Beijing National Indoor Stadium; Referees: Canbro, Claesson (SWE)
22 August 2008; 14:15	Jurasik 7	(15–14)	Yoon Kyung-shin 6	Beijing National Indoor Stadium; Referees: Canbro, Claesson (SWE)
22 August 2008; 14:15	3× (yellow card) 3× (suspension)	Report	3× (yellow card) 5× (suspension)	Beijing National Indoor Stadium; Referees: Canbro, Claesson (SWE)

7th–8th place

24 August 2008; 08:00	Denmark	37 – 26	South Korea	Beijing National Indoor Stadium; Referees: Aires Menezes, Aparecido Pinto (BRA)
24 August 2008; 08:00	Hansen 8	(15–13)	Ko Kyung-soo 10	Beijing National Indoor Stadium; Referees: Aires Menezes, Aparecido Pinto (BRA)
24 August 2008; 08:00	3× (yellow card) 4× (suspension)	Report	2× (yellow card) 1× (suspension)	Beijing National Indoor Stadium; Referees: Aires Menezes, Aparecido Pinto (BRA)

=== Women's tournament ===
Roster

The following is the South Korea roster in the women's handball tournament of the 2008 Summer Olympics.

Head coach: Lim Young-chul

No.	Pos.	Name	Date of birth (age)	Height	App.	Goals	Club
1	GK	Oh Yong-ran	6 September 1972 (aged 35)	1.71 m			(South Korea) Byucksan Construction Incheon
3	CB	Kim On-a	6 September 1988 (aged 19)	1.67 m			(South Korea) Byucksan Construction Incheon
4	P	Huh Soon-young	28 September 1975 (aged 32)	1.80 m			(Denmark) SK Aarhus
6	LB	Song Hai-rim	12 January 1985 (aged 23)	1.67 m			(South Korea) Daegu Metropolitan City
7	LW	Kim Nam-sun	3 May 1981 (aged 27)	1.70 m			(South Korea) Byucksan Construction Incheon
9	P	Kim Cha-youn	10 February 1981 (aged 27)	1.73 m			(Austria) Hypo Niederösterreich
10	CB	Oh Seong-ok	10 October 1972 (aged 35)	1.71 m			(Austria) Hypo Niederösterreich
11	RB	Hong Jeong-ho	6 May 1974 (aged 34)	1.78 m			(Japan) Omron
13	RW	Park Chung-hee	10 April 1975 (aged 33)	1.78 m			(South Korea) Byucksan Construction Incheon
16	GK	Lee Min-hee	4 February 1980 (aged 28)	1.74 m			(South Korea) Yongin City Hall
17	LW	An Jung-hwa	20 February 1981 (aged 27)	1.62 m			(South Korea) Daegu Metropolitan City
18	RW	Bae Min-hee	11 July 1988 (aged 20)	1.69 m			(South Korea) Korea National Sport University
19	RB	Choi Im-jeong	14 February 1981 (aged 27)	1.80 m			(Denmark) SK Aarhus
20	LB	Moon Pil-hee	2 December 1982 (aged 25)	1.68 m			(South Korea) Byucksan Construction Incheon

Group play

Team	Pld	W	D	L	GF	GA	GD	Pts	Qualification
Russia	5	4	1	0	148	125	+23	9	Qualified for the quarterfinals
South Korea	5	3	1	1	155	127	+28	7	Qualified for the quarterfinals
Hungary	5	2	1	2	129	142	−13	5	Qualified for the quarterfinals
Sweden	5	2	0	3	123	137	−14	4	Qualified for the quarterfinals
Brazil	5	1	1	3	124	137	−13	3	
Germany	5	1	0	4	123	134	−11	2	

9 August 2008; 15:45	Russia	29 – 29	South Korea	Olympic Sports Centre Gymnasium; Referees: Gjeding, Hansen (DEN)
9 August 2008; 15:45	Marennikova 6	(16–13)	Kim On-a 7	Olympic Sports Centre Gymnasium; Referees: Gjeding, Hansen (DEN)
9 August 2008; 15:45	3× (yellow card) 5× (suspension)	Report	2× (yellow card) 2× (suspension)	Olympic Sports Centre Gymnasium; Referees: Gjeding, Hansen (DEN)

11 August 2008; 15:45	South Korea	30 – 20	Germany	Olympic Sports Centre Gymnasium; Referees: Krstic, Ljubic (SLO)
11 August 2008; 15:45	Hong Jeong-ho 6	(12–9)	Jurack, Loerper 4	Olympic Sports Centre Gymnasium; Referees: Krstic, Ljubic (SLO)
11 August 2008; 15:45	3× (yellow card) 6× (suspension)	Report	3× (yellow card) 3× (suspension)	Olympic Sports Centre Gymnasium; Referees: Krstic, Ljubic (SLO)

13 August 2008; 14:00	South Korea	31 – 23	Sweden	Olympic Sports Centre Gymnasium; Referees: Baum, Goralczyk (POL)
13 August 2008; 14:00	An, Park 7	(18–13)	Ahlm, Boson 6	Olympic Sports Centre Gymnasium; Referees: Baum, Goralczyk (POL)
13 August 2008; 14:00	3× (yellow card) 1× (suspension) 1× (red card)	Report	4× (yellow card) 6× (suspension)	Olympic Sports Centre Gymnasium; Referees: Baum, Goralczyk (POL)

15 August 2008; 10:45	Brazil	33 – 32	South Korea	Olympic Sports Centre Gymnasium; Referees: Licis, Stolarovs (LAT)
15 August 2008; 10:45	Nascimento 9	(17–12)	Hong Jeong-ho 10	Olympic Sports Centre Gymnasium; Referees: Licis, Stolarovs (LAT)
15 August 2008; 10:45	4× (yellow card) 6× (suspension)	Report	3× (yellow card) 5× (suspension) 1× (red card)	Olympic Sports Centre Gymnasium; Referees: Licis, Stolarovs (LAT)

17 August 2008; 20:45	Hungary	22 – 33	South Korea	Olympic Sports Centre Gymnasium; Referees: Breto, Huelin (ESP)
17 August 2008; 20:45	Görbicz 7	(11–19)	Oh Seong-ok 6	Olympic Sports Centre Gymnasium; Referees: Breto, Huelin (ESP)
17 August 2008; 20:45	4× (yellow card) 5× (suspension)	Report	3× (yellow card) 3× (suspension)	Olympic Sports Centre Gymnasium; Referees: Breto, Huelin (ESP)

Quarterfinal

19 August 2008; 18:00	South Korea	31 – 23	China	Olympic Sports Centre Gymnasium; Referees: Aires, Aparecido (BRA)
19 August 2008; 18:00	Park Chung-hee 8	(16–12)	Huang Dongjie 5	Olympic Sports Centre Gymnasium; Referees: Aires, Aparecido (BRA)
19 August 2008; 18:00	3× (yellow card) 4× (suspension)	Report	4× (yellow card) 1× (suspension)	Olympic Sports Centre Gymnasium; Referees: Aires, Aparecido (BRA)

Semifinal

21 August 2008; 18:00	Norway	29 – 28	South Korea	Beijing National Indoor Stadium; Referees: Breto, Huelin (ESP)
21 August 2008; 18:00	Hammerseng, Johansen 6	(14–15)	Moon Pil-hee 9	Beijing National Indoor Stadium; Referees: Breto, Huelin (ESP)
21 August 2008; 18:00	2× (yellow card) 3× (suspension)	Report	3× (yellow card) 2× (suspension)	Beijing National Indoor Stadium; Referees: Breto, Huelin (ESP)

Bronze medal game

23 August 2008; 13:30	South Korea	33 – 28	Hungary	Beijing National Indoor Stadium; Referees: Chernega, Poladenko (RUS)
23 August 2008; 13:30	Moon Pil-hee 10	(13–15)	Ferling 7	Beijing National Indoor Stadium; Referees: Chernega, Poladenko (RUS)
23 August 2008; 13:30	3× (yellow card) 3× (suspension)	Report	3× (yellow card) 7× (suspension)	Beijing National Indoor Stadium; Referees: Chernega, Poladenko (RUS)

Final rank

Bronze

== Judo ==
Men

Athlete	Event	Preliminary	Round of 32	Round of 16	Quarterfinals	Semifinals	Repechage 1	Repechage 2	Repechage 3	Final / BM	
Athlete	Event	Opposition Result	Opposition Result	Opposition Result	Opposition Result	Opposition Result	Opposition Result	Opposition Result	Opposition Result	Opposition Result	Rank
Choi Min-ho	−60 kg	Bye	Albarracín (ARG); W 1000–0000	Akhondzadeh (IRI); W 1000–0000	Sobirov (UZB); W 1001–0000	Houkes (NED); W 1000–0000	Bye			Paischer (AUT); W 1000–0000	1st place, gold medalist(s)
Kim Joo-jin	−66 kg	Bye	Derly (BRA); L 0001–0002	Did not advance							
Wang Ki-chun	−73 kg	—N/a	Ibragimov (KAZ); W 1011–0000	Muminov (UZB); W 1100–0000	Guilheiro (BRA); W 0100–0000	Boqiev (TJK); W 0010–0001	Bye			Mammadli (AZE); L 0000–1000	2nd place, silver medalist(s)
Kim Jae-bum	−81 kg	Bye	Shundzikau (BLR); W 0011–0000	Krawczyk (POL); W 1100–0001	Neto (POR); W 0001–0000	Elmont (NED); W 0001–0000	Bye			Bischof (GER); L 0000–0010	2nd place, silver medalist(s)
Choi Sun-ho	−90 kg	—N/a	Mesbah (EGY); L 0000–0000 YUS	Did not advance							
Jang Sung-ho	−100 kg	—N/a	Rosales (VEN); W 1010–0001	Despaigne (CUB); W 0001–0000	Naidangiin (MGL); L 0010–0011	Did not advance	Bye	Behrla (GER); W 1000–0000	Zhorzholiani (GEO); L 0020–0021	Did not advance	
Kim Sung-bum	+100 kg	Brutus (HAI); W 1001–0000	Padar (EST); L 0000–1100	Did not advance							

Women

Athlete	Event	Round of 32	Round of 16	Quarterfinals	Semifinals	Repechage 1	Repechage 2	Repechage 3	Final / BM	
Athlete	Event	Opposition Result	Opposition Result	Opposition Result	Opposition Result	Opposition Result	Opposition Result	Opposition Result	Opposition Result	Rank
Kim Young-ran	−48 kg	Bye	Lusnikova (UKR); W 0100–0000	Dumitru (ROU); L 0000–1000	Did not advance	Bye	Csernoviczki (HUN); L 0000–0001	Did not advance		
Kim Kyung-ok	−52 kg	Bye	García (DOM); W 1003–0000	Haddad (ALG); L 0001–0210	Did not advance	Bye	Müller (LUX); W 0010–0001	Carrascosa (ESP); W 1010–0001	Nakamura (JPN); L 0000–0200	5
Kang Sin-young	−57 kg	Quadros (BRA); L 0002–0011	Did not advance							
Kong Ja-young	−63 kg	Yuri (BRA); W 1000–0100	Xu Yh (CHN); W 0100–0012	Tanimoto (JPN); L 0001–1000	Did not advance	Bye	Barreto (VEN); L 0100–1001	Did not advance		
Park Ka-yeon	−70 kg	Ueno (JPN); L 0000–1010	Did not advance			Wang J (CHN); L 0000–1010	Did not advance			
Jeong Gyeong-mi	−78 kg	Bye	Rogers (GBR); W 0001–0000	Wollert (GER); W 1002–0000	Castillo (CUB); L 0000–0001	Bye			Silva (BRA); W 1010–0000	3rd place, bronze medalist(s)
Kim Na-young	+78 kg	Bye	Chikhrouhou (TUN); W 0011–0001	Tong W (CHN); L 0000–1001	Did not advance	Bye	Donguzashvili (RUS); W 1000–0000	Ramadan (EGY); W 0200–0000	Polavder (SLO); L 0000–0001	5

== Modern pentathlon ==
Athlete	Event	Shooting (10 m air pistol)			Fencing (épée one touch)			Swimming (200 m freestyle)			Riding (show jumping)			Running (3000 m)			Total points	Final rank
Athlete	Event	Points	Rank	MP Points	Results	Rank	MP points	Time	Rank	MP points	Penalties	Rank	MP points	Time	Rank	MP Points	Total points	Final rank
Lee Choon-huan	Men's	176	26	1048	19–16	10	856	2:09.18	27	1252	1116*	34	84	9:41.05	20	1076	4316	33
Nam Dong-hong	Men's	181	18	1108	15–20	24	760	2:05.28	16	1300	380	30	540	8:55.57 OR	1	1260	4968	28
Yun Cho-rong	Women's	166	34	928	16–19	22	784	2:22.88	24	1208	140	24	1060	11:47.30	35	892	4872	33

* Did not finish

== Rowing ==
Men

Athlete	Event	Heats		Repechage		Semifinals		Final	
Athlete	Event	Time	Rank	Time	Rank	Time	Rank	Time	Rank
Jang Kang-eun; Kim Hong-kyun	Lightweight double sculls	6:42.97	5 R	7:12.17	6 SC/D	6:47.13	4 FD	6:47.44	20

Women

Athlete	Event	Heats		Repechage		Quarterfinals		Semifinals		Final	
Athlete	Event	Time	Rank	Time	Rank	Time	Rank	Time	Rank	Time	Rank
Shin Yeong-eun	Single sculls	8:17.40	3 QF	—N/a		7:58.71	6 SC/D	8:23.62	5 FD	7:48.31	20
Ji Yoo-jin; Ko Young-eun	Lightweight double sculls	7:39.70	5 R	8:03.51	6 FC	—N/a		Bye		7:39.46	17

Qualification Legend: FA=Final A (medal); FB=Final B (non-medal); FC=Final C (non-medal); FD=Final D (non-medal); FE=Final E (non-medal); FF=Final F (non-medal); SA/B=Semifinals A/B; SC/D=Semifinals C/D; SE/F=Semifinals E/F; QF=Quarterfinals; R=Repechage

== Sailing ==
Men

Athlete	Event	Race											Net points	Final rank
Athlete	Event	1	2	3	4	5	6	7	8	9	10	M*	Net points	Final rank
Lee Tae-hoon	RS:X	22	14	20	15	20	~~25~~	13	11	9	9	EL	133	18
Ha Jee-min	Laser	23	33	~~37~~	31	13	17	17	34	22	CAN	EL	190	28
Kim Hyeong-tae; Yoon Cheul	470	17	24	21	~~27~~	20	3	23	25	22	25	EL	180	25

M = Medal race; EL = Eliminated – did not advance into the medal race; CAN = Race cancelled

== Shooting ==
Men

Athlete	Event	Qualification		Final	
Athlete	Event	Points	Rank	Points	Rank
Han Jin-seop	10 m air rifle	590	26	Did not advance	
Han Jin-seop	50 m rifle 3 positions	1165	15	Did not advance	
Jin Jong-oh	10 m air pistol	584	2 Q	684.5	2nd place, silver medalist(s)
Jin Jong-oh	50 m pistol	563	6 Q	660.4	1st place, gold medalist(s)
Kim Hak-man	50 m rifle prone	591	28	Did not advance	
Lee Dae-myung	10 m air pistol	580	16	Did not advance	
Lee Dae-myung	50 m pistol	551	26	Did not advance	
Lee Young-sik	Trap	115	15	Did not advance	
Park Bong-duk	10 m air rifle	593	16	Did not advance	
Park Bong-duk	50 m rifle prone	587	43	Did not advance	
Park Bong-duk	50 m rifle 3 positions	1159	31	Did not advance	

Women

Athlete	Event	Qualification		Final	
Athlete	Event	Points	Rank	Points	Rank
Ahn Soo-kyeong	25 m pistol	288	23	Did not advance	
Kim Chan-mi	10 m air rifle	396	10	Did not advance	
Kim Min-ji	Skeet	55	18	Did not advance	
Kim Yeo-oul	10 m air rifle	395	13	Did not advance	
Kim Yoo-yeon	50 m rifle 3 positions	569	34	Did not advance	
Kim Yun-mi	10 m air pistol	382	16	Did not advance	
Lee Bo-na	Trap	55	19	Did not advance	
Lee Ho-lim	10 m air pistol	380	21	Did not advance	
Lee Ho-lim	25 m pistol	289	20	Did not advance	

== Swimming ==
Men

Athlete	Event	Heat		Semifinal		Final	
Athlete	Event	Time	Rank	Time	Rank	Time	Rank
Kim Ji-heun	200 m backstroke	2:00.72	26	Did not advance			
Lim Nam-gyun	100 m freestyle	51.80	54	Did not advance			
Park Beom-ho	200 m individual medley	2:06.17	44	Did not advance			
Park Tae-hwan	200 m freestyle	1:46.73	6 Q	1:45.99	2 Q	1:44.85 AS	2nd place, silver medalist(s)
Park Tae-hwan	400 m freestyle	3:43.10	1 Q	—N/a		3:41.86 AS	1st place, gold medalist(s)
Park Tae-hwan	1500 m freestyle	15:05.55	16	—N/a		Did not advance	
Shin Su-jong	200 m breaststroke	2:16.21	43	Did not advance			
Sung Min	100 m backstroke	54.99 NR	23	Did not advance			
Yoo Jung-nam	200 m butterfly	2:01.00	34	Did not advance			

Women

Athlete	Event	Heat		Semifinal		Final	
Athlete	Event	Time	Rank	Time	Rank	Time	Rank
Chang Hee-jin	50 m freestyle	25.59	31	Did not advance			
Chang Hee-jin	100 m freestyle	55.96	32	Did not advance			
Choi Hye-ra	100 m butterfly	1:00.65	40	Did not advance			
Choi Hye-ra	200 m butterfly	2:11.42	24	Did not advance			
Choi Hye-ra	200 m individual medley	2:15.26	24	Did not advance			
Jeong Da-rae	200 m breaststroke	2:27.28	16 Q	2:28.28	14	Did not advance	
Jung Seul-ki	100 m breaststroke	1:09.26	23	Did not advance			
Jung Seul-ki	200 m breaststroke	2:25.95	11 Q	2:26.83	11	Did not advance	
Kang Yeong-seo	200 m backstroke	2:14.52	26	Did not advance			
Kim Yu-yeon	100 m backstroke	1:04.63	44	Did not advance			
Lee Ji-eun	400 m freestyle	4:21.53	37	—N/a		Did not advance	
Lee Keo-ra	200 m freestyle	2:05.71	46	Did not advance			
Nam Yoo-sun	400 m individual medley	4:46.74	27	—N/a		Did not advance	

== Table tennis ==
South Korea had qualified places in both singles and team events.

Men's singles

Athlete	Event	Preliminary round	Round 1	Round 2	Round 3	Round 4	Quarterfinals	Semifinals	Final / BM	
Athlete	Event	Opposition Result	Opposition Result	Opposition Result	Opposition Result	Opposition Result	Opposition Result	Opposition Result	Opposition Result	Rank
Oh Sang-eun	Singles	Bye			Toriola (NGR); W 4–3	Boll (GER); W 4–1	Ma L (CHN); L 0–4	Did not advance		
Ryu Seung-min	Singles	Bye			Ko L C (HKG); L 2–4	Did not advance				
Yoon Jae-young	Singles	Bye		Henzell (AUS); W 4–3	Schlager (AUT); L 3–4	Did not advance				

Women's singles

Athlete	Event	Preliminary round	Round 1	Round 2	Round 3	Round 4	Quarterfinals	Semifinals	Final / BM	
Athlete	Event	Opposition Result	Opposition Result	Opposition Result	Opposition Result	Opposition Result	Opposition Result	Opposition Result	Opposition Result	Rank
Dang Ye-seo	Singles	Bye		Miao (AUS); W 4–1	Feng Tw (SIN); L 0–4	Did not advance				
Kim Kyung-ah	Singles	Bye			Fukuoka (JPN); W 4–2	Wang (USA); L 3–4	Did not advance			
Park Mi-young	Singles	Bye			Kim J (PRK); W 4–0	Wang N (CHN); L 2–4	Did not advance			

Team

Athlete	Event	Group round		Semifinals	Bronze playoff 1	Bronze playoff 2	Bronze medal	Final	
Athlete	Event	Opposition Result	Rank	Opposition Result	Opposition Result	Opposition Result	Opposition Result	Opposition Result	Rank
Oh Sang-eun; Ryu Seung-min; Yoon Jae-young	Men's team	Group C Chinese Taipei; W 3 – 1 Sweden; W 3 – 0 Brazil; W 3 – 1	1 Q	China; L 0 – 3	Bye	Hong Kong; W 3 – 1	Austria; W 3 – 1	Did not advance	3rd place, bronze medalist(s)
Dang Ye-seo; Kim Kyung-ah; Park Mi-young	Women's team	Group D Japan; W 3 – 0 Spain; W 3 – 0 Australia; W 3 – 0	1 Q	Singapore; L 2 – 3	Bye	United States; W 3 – 0	Japan; W 3 – 0	Did not advance	3rd place, bronze medalist(s)

== Taekwondo ==
Athlete	Event	Round of 16	Quarterfinals	Semifinals	Repechage	Bronze Medal	Final	
Athlete	Event	Opposition Result	Opposition Result	Opposition Result	Opposition Result	Opposition Result	Opposition Result	Rank
Son Tae-jin	Men's −68 kg	Bekkers (NED); W 4–3	Tazegül (TUR); W 1–0	Sung Y-c (TPE); W 7–6	Bye		M López (USA); W 3–2	1st place, gold medalist(s)
Cha Dong-min	Men's +80 kg	Moitland (CRC); W 1–(−2)	Irgashev (UZB); W 2–0	Matos (CUB); W 1–0	Bye		Nikolaidis (GRE); W 5–4	1st place, gold medalist(s)
Lim Su-jeong	Women's −57 kg	Su L-W (TPE); W 1–0	Cheong (NZL); W 4–1	Calabrese (ITA); W 5–1	Bye		Tanrıkulu (TUR); W 1–0	1st place, gold medalist(s)
Hwang Kyung-seon	Women's −67 kg	Al-Maktoum (UAE); W 5–1	Šarić (CRO); W 3–1	Épangue (FRA); W 2–1	Bye		Sergerie (CAN); W 2–1	1st place, gold medalist(s)

== Tennis ==
Athlete	Event	Round of 64	Round of 32	Round of 16	Quarterfinals	Semifinals	Final / BM	
Athlete	Event	Opposition Score	Opposition Score	Opposition Score	Opposition Score	Opposition Score	Opposition Score	Rank
Lee Hyung-taik	Men's singles	Arévalo (ESA); L 6–4, 3–6, 4–6	Did not advance					

== Weightlifting ==
Men

Athlete	Event	Snatch		Clean & Jerk		Total	Rank
Athlete	Event	Result	Rank	Result	Rank	Total	Rank
Ji Hun-min	−62 kg	142	2	~~161~~	DNF	142	DNF
Lee Bae-young	−69 kg	155	2	~~186~~	DNF	155	DNF
Kim Kwang-hoon	−77 kg	155	11	200	2	355	4
Sa Jae-hyouk	−77 kg	163	3	203	1	366	1st place, gold medalist(s)
Jeon Sang-guen	+105 kg	~~195~~	DNF	—	—	—	DNF

Women

Athlete	Event	Snatch		Clean & Jerk		Total	Rank
Athlete	Event	Result	Rank	Result	Rank	Total	Rank
Im Jyoung-hwa	−48 kg	86	3	110	4	196	2nd place, silver medalist(s)
Yoon Jin-hee	−53 kg	94	3	119	2	213	2nd place, silver medalist(s)
Kim Soo-kyung	−63 kg	98	7	127	3	225	5
Jang Mi-ran	+75 kg	140	1	186	1	326	1st place, gold medalist(s)

== Wrestling ==
Key:

- VT - Victory by Fall.
- PP - Decision by Points - the loser with technical points.
- PO - Decision by Points - the loser without technical points.

Men's freestyle

Athlete	Event	Qualification	Round of 16	Quarterfinal	Semifinal	Repechage 1	Repechage 2	Final / BM	
Athlete	Event	Opposition Result	Opposition Result	Opposition Result	Opposition Result	Opposition Result	Opposition Result	Opposition Result	Rank
Kim Hyo-sub	−55 kg	Bye	Sanchez (ESP); W 3–1 ^{PP}	Sevdimov (AZE); L 1–3 ^{PP}	Did not advance				9
Kim Jong-dae	−60 kg	Bye	Ramazanov (MKD); L 1–3 ^{PP}	Did not advance					14
Jung Young-ho	−66 kg	Bye	Barzakov (BUL); L 1–3 ^{PP}	Did not advance					17
Cho Byung-kwan	−74 kg	Saitiev (RUS); L 1–3 ^{PP}	Did not advance			Gülhan (TUR); W 3–1 ^{PP}	Fundora (CUB); L 0–3 ^{PO}	Did not advance	11
Kim Jae-gang	−120 kg	Bye	Mutalimov (KAZ); L 1–3 ^{PP}	Did not advance					15

Men's Greco-Roman

Athlete	Event	Qualification	Round of 16	Quarterfinal	Semifinal	Repechage 1	Repechage 2	Final / BM	
Athlete	Event	Opposition Result	Opposition Result	Opposition Result	Opposition Result	Opposition Result	Opposition Result	Opposition Result	Rank
Park Eun-chul	−55 kg	Bye	Nyblom (DEN); W 3–1 ^{PP}	Mango (USA); W 3–1 ^{PP}	Mankiev (RUS); L 0–3 ^{PO}	Bye		Sourian (IRI); W 3–1 ^{PP}	3rd place, bronze medalist(s)
Jung Ji-hyun	−60 kg	Bye	Dubinin (BLR); W 3–0 ^{PO}	Tengizbayev (KAZ); L 1–3 ^{PP}	Did not advance				9
Kim Min-chul	−66 kg	Mohammadi (IRI); L 1–3 ^{PP}	Did not advance						15
Kim Jung-sub	−84 kg	Abrahamian (SWE); L 1–3 ^{PP}	Did not advance						13
Han Tae-young	−96 kg	Bye	Englich (GER); L 1–3 ^{PP}	Did not advance		Bye	Guri (ALB); W 3–1 ^{PP}	Wheeler (USA); L 1–3 ^{PP}	5

Women's freestyle

Athlete	Event	Qualification	Round of 16	Quarterfinal	Semifinal	Repechage 1	Repechage 2	Final / BM	
Athlete	Event	Opposition Result	Opposition Result	Opposition Result	Opposition Result	Opposition Result	Opposition Result	Opposition Result	Rank
Kim Hyung-joo	−48 kg	Bye	Bremner (AUS); W 3–0 ^{PO}	Huynh (CAN); L 0–3 ^{PO}	Did not advance	Bye	Stadnik (AZE); L 1–3 ^{PP}	Did not advance	8
