= Badminton at the 2008 Summer Olympics – Women's singles =

Women's singles at the Games of the XXIX Olympiad
- Venue: Beijing University of Technology; Gymnasium
- Date: 9 August to 16 August 2008
- Competitors: 47 from 42 nations

Medalists
1st place, gold medalist(s)		Zhang Ning	China
2nd place, silver medalist(s)		Xie Xingfang	China
3rd place, bronze medalist(s)		Maria Kristin Yulianti	Indonesia

These are the results of the women's singles competition in badminton at the 2008 Summer Olympics in Beijing.

The tournament consisted of a single-elimination tournament. Matches were played using a best-of-three games format. Games were played to 21 points, using rally scoring. Each game had to be won by a margin of two points, except when the game was won by a player who reached 30 even if the lead was only 1 at that point.

The top eight seeds in the tournament were placed in the bracket so as not to face each other until the quarterfinals. All other competitors were placed by draw.

== Seeds ==
Two players for China – Zhang Ning and Xie Xingfang – took gold and silver, respectively, while Maria Kristin Yulianti of Indonesia received bronze in the women's singles tournament.

1. Xie Xingfang (CHN) (silver medallist)
2. Zhang Ning (CHN) (gold medallist)
3. Lu Lan (CHN) (fourth place)
4. Wang Chen (HKG) (third round)
5. Pi Hongyan (FRA) (quarter-finals)
6. Tine Rasmussen (DEN) (third round)
7. Xu Huaiwen (GER) (quarter-finals)
8. Wong Mew Choo (MAS) (quarter-finals)

== Draw ==
=== Finals ===
Quarter-finals
1	Xie Xingfang (CHN)	21	22
7	Xu Huaiwen (GER)	19	20
3	Lu Lan (CHN)	21	29
8	Wong Mew Choo (MAS)	7	27
Maria Kristin Yulianti (INA)	26	21	21
Saina Nehwal (IND)	28	14	15
5	Pi Hongyan (FRA)	8	21	19
2	Zhang Ning (CHN)	21	19	21

Semi-finals
1	Xie Xingfang (CHN)	7	21	21
3	Lu Lan (CHN)	21	10	12
Maria Kristin Yulianti (INA)	15	15
2	Zhang Ning (CHN)	21	21

Final
1	Xie Xingfang (CHN)	12	21	18
2	Zhang Ning (CHN)	21	10	21
Third place
3	Lu Lan (CHN)	21	13	15
Maria Kristin Yulianti (INA)	11	21	21

=== Section 1 ===
First round
Xing Aiying (SIN)	19	12
Olga Konon (BLR)	21	21
Yip Pui Yin (HKG)	15	17
Tracey Hallam (GBR)	21	21
Grace Daniel (NGR)	13	8
Kristína Ludíková (CZE)	21	21

Second round
1	Xie Xingfang (CHN)	21	21
Cheng Shao-chieh (TPE)	1	9
Maja Tvrdy (SLO)	17	14
Olga Konon (BLR)	21	21
7	Xu Huaiwen (GER)	21	21
Anu Nieminen (FIN)	17	8
Tracey Hallam (GBR)	21	21
Kristína Ludíková (CZE)	18	13

Third round
1	Xie Xingfang (CHN)	21	21
Olga Konon (BLR)	16	15
7	Xu Huaiwen (GER)	21	21
Tracey Hallam (GBR)	10	7

Quarter-finals
1	Xie Xingfang (CHN)	21	22
7	Xu Huaiwen (GER)	19	20

=== Section 2 ===
First round
Jeanine Cicognini (SUI)	21	21
Ana Moura (POR)	9	13
Anna Rice (CAN)	21	19	21
Eva Lee (USA)	15	21	19
Deyanira Angulo (MEX)	18	21	14
Hadia Hosny (EGY)	21	7	21
Petya Nedelcheva (BUL)	21	21
Sara Persson (SWE)	10	10

Second round
3	Lu Lan (CHN)	21	7
Karen Foo Kune (MRI)	3	1	r
Jeanine Cicognini (SUI)	10	13
Anna Rice (CAN)	21	21
8	Wong Mew Choo (MAS)	21	21
Kerry-Lee Harrington (RSA)	4	4
Hadia Hosny (EGY)	7	4
Petya Nedelcheva (BUL)	21	21

Third round
3	Lu Lan (CHN)	21	21
Anna Rice (CAN)	7	12
8	Wong Mew Choo (MAS)	21	21
Petya Nedelcheva (BUL)	16	8

Quarter-finals
3	Lu Lan (CHN)	21	29
8	Wong Mew Choo (MAS)	7	27

=== Section 3 ===
First round
Erin Carroll (AUS)	9	16
Yoana Martínez (ESP)	21	21
Juliane Schenk (GER)	21	13	20
Maria Kristin Yulianti (INA)	18	21	22
Larisa Griga (UKR)	21	21
Agnese Allegrini (ITA)	15	11
Ella Diehl (RUS)	9	8
Saina Nehwal (IND)	21	21

Second round
Yoana Martínez (ESP)	9	14
Maria Kristin Yulianti (INA)	21	21
Akvilė Stapušaitytė (LTU)	6	8
6	Tine Rasmussen (DEN)	21	21
Larisa Griga (UKR)	18	10
Saina Nehwal (IND)	21	21
Eva Sládeková (SVK)	7	7
4	Wang Chen (HKG)	21	21

Third round
Maria Kristin Yulianti (INA)	18	21	21
6	Tine Rasmussen (DEN)	21	19	14
Saina Nehwal (IND)	21	11	21
4	Wang Chen (HKG)	19	21	11

Quarterfinals
Maria Kristin Yulianti (INA)	26	21	21
Saina Nehwal (IND)	28	14	15

=== Section 4 ===
First round
Thilini Jayasinghe (SRI)	13	12
Nguyen Nhung Le Ngoc (VIE)	21	21
Eriko Hirose (JPN)	21	19
Ragna Ingólfsdóttir (ISL)	6	7	r
Chloe Magee (IRL)	18	21	21
Kati Tolmoff (EST)	21	18	19
Kamila Augustyn (POL)	15	5
Jun Jae-youn (KOR)	21	21

Second round
Nguyen Nhung Le Ngoc (VIE)	7	12
Eriko Hirose (JPN)	21	21
Claudia Rivero (PER)	6	9
5	Pi Hongyan (FRA)	21	21
Chloe Magee (IRL)	12	14
Jun Jae-youn (KOR)	21	21
Salakjit Ponsana (THA)	23	17	7
2	Zhang Ning (CHN)	21	21	21

Third round
Eriko Hirose (JPN)	12	21	6
5	Pi Hongyan (FRA)	21	16	21
Jun Jae-youn (KOR)	11	12
2	Zhang Ning (CHN)	21	21

Quarterfinals
5	Pi Hongyan (FRA)	8	21	19
2	Zhang Ning (CHN)	21	19	21
