= Badminton at the 2008 Summer Olympics – Men's singles =

Men's singles at the Games of the XXIX Olympiad
- Venue: Beijing University of Technology; Gymnasium
- Date: 9 August to 17 August 2008
- Competitors: 41 from 35 nations

Medalists
1st place, gold medalist(s)		Lin Dan	China
2nd place, silver medalist(s)		Lee Chong Wei	Malaysia
3rd place, bronze medalist(s)		Chen Jin	China

These are the results of the men's singles competition in badminton at the 2008 Summer Olympics in Beijing.

The tournament consisted of a single-elimination tournament. Matches were played using a best-of-three games format. Games were played to 21 points, using rally scoring. Each game had to be won by a margin of two points, except when the game was won by a player who reached 30 even if the lead was only 1 at that point.

The top eight seeds in the tournament were placed in the bracket so as not to face each other until the quarterfinals. All other competitors were placed by draw.

== Seeds ==
Two players for China – Lin Dan and Chen Jin – took gold and bronze, respectively – while Lee Chong Wei of Malaysia won silver in the men's singles tournament.

1. Lin Dan (CHN) (gold medalist)
2. Lee Chong Wei (MAS) (silver medalist)
3. Bao Chunlai (CHN) (quarter-finals)
4. Chen Jin (CHN) (bronze medalist)
5. Kenneth Jonassen (DEN) (second round)
6. Sony Dwi Kuncoro (INA) (quarter-finals)
7. Taufik Hidayat (INA) (second round)
8. Peter Gade (DEN) (quarter-finals)

== Draw ==
=== Finals ===
Quarter-finals
1	Lin Dan (CHN)	21	21
8	Peter Gade (DEN)	13	16
4	Chen Jin (CHN)	21	21
Hsieh Yu-Hsing (TPE)	8	14
Lee Hyun-il (KOR)	23	21
3	Bao Chunlai (CHN)	21	11
6	Sony Dwi Kuncoro (INA)	9	11
2	Lee Chong Wei (MAS)	21	21

Semi-finals
1	Lin Dan (CHN)	21	21
4	Chen Jin (CHN)	12	18
Lee Hyun-il (KOR)	18	21	13
2	Lee Chong Wei (MAS)	21	13	21

Final
1	Lin Dan (CHN)	21	21
2	Lee Chong Wei (MAS)	12	8
Bronze-medal match
4	Chen Jin (CHN)	21	12	21
Lee Hyun-il (KOR)	16	21	14

=== Section 1 ===
First round
Andrew Dabeka (CAN)	11	11
Park Sung-hwan (KOR)	21	21
Anup Sridhar (IND)	21	21
Marco Vasconcelos (POR)	16	14

Second round
1	Lin Dan (CHN)	21	21
Ng Wei (HKG)	16	13
Edwin Ekiring (UGA)	5	8
Park Sung-hwan (KOR)	21	21
8	Peter Gade (DEN)	21	21
Nabil Lasmari (ALG)	6	4
Shoji Sato (JPN)	21	21
Anup Sridhar (IND)	13	17

Third round
1	Lin Dan (CHN)	21	21
Park Sung-hwan (KOR)	8	11
8	Peter Gade (DEN)	19	22	21
Shoji Sato (JPN)	21	20	15

Quarter-finals
1	Lin Dan (CHN)	21	21
8	Peter Gade (DEN)	13	16

=== Section 2 ===
First round
Erwin Kehlhoffner (FRA)	19	22	21
Stuart Gomez (AUS)	21	20	15
Hsieh Yu-Hsing (TPE)	21	21
Kaveh Mehrabi (IRI)	16	12

Second round
4	Chen Jin (CHN)	21	21
John Moody (NZL)	9	11
WC	Eli Mambwe (ZAM)	15	17
Erwin Kehlhoffner (FRA)	21	21
7	Taufik Hidayat (INA)	19	16
Wong Choong Hann (MAS)	21	21
Nguyen Tien Minh (VIE)	16	21	15
Hsieh Yu-Hsing (TPE)	21	15	21

Third round
4	Chen Jin (CHN)	21	21
Erwin Kehlhoffner (FRA)	10	6
Wong Choong Hann (MAS)	21	17	18
Hsieh Yu-Hsing (TPE)	14	21	21

Quarter-finals
4	Chen Jin (CHN)	21	21
Hsieh Yu-Hsing (TPE)	8	14

=== Section 3 ===
First round
Scott Evans (IRL)	18	21	19
Marc Zwiebler (GER)	21	18	21
Petr Koukal (CZE)	21	12	15
Andrew Smith (GBR)	10	21	21
Przemysław Wacha (POL)	21	21
Raul Must (EST)	14	15

Second round
Marc Zwiebler (GER)	16	21	21
Andrew Smith (GBR)	21	13	17
Lee Hyun-il (KOR)	15	21	21
5	Kenneth Jonassen (DEN)	21	14	19
Przemysław Wacha (POL)	21	11	21
Christian Bösiger (SUI)	12	21	19
Kevin Cordón (GUA)	17	16
3	Bao Chunlai (CHN)	21	21

Third round
Marc Zwiebler (GER)	13	11
Lee Hyun-il (KOR)	21	21
Przemysław Wacha (POL)	11	21	13
3	Bao Chunlai (CHN)	21	19	21

Quarter-finals
Lee Hyun-il (KOR)	23	21
3	Bao Chunlai (CHN)	21	11

=== Section 4 ===
First round
Ville Lång (FIN)	21	21
Vladislav Druzchenko (UKR)	12	19
Kęstutis Navickas (LTU)	23	12	21
Pablo Abián (ESP)	21	21	9

Second round
Ville Lång (FIN)	21	21
Raju Rai (USA)	9	16
Boonsak Ponsana (THA)	16	14
6	Sony Dwi Kuncoro (INA)	21	21
Kęstutis Navickas (LTU)	21	21
Stanislav Pukhov (RUS)	12	17
Ronald Susilo (SIN)	13	14
2	Lee Chong Wei (MAS)	21	21

Third round
Ville Lång (FIN)	13	18
6	Sony Dwi Kuncoro (INA)	21	21
Kęstutis Navickas (LTU)	5	7
2	Lee Chong Wei (MAS)	21	21

Quarter-finals
6	Sony Dwi Kuncoro (INA)	9	11
2	Lee Chong Wei (MAS)	21	21
