= Badminton at the 2008 Summer Olympics – Men's doubles =

Men's doubles at the Games of the XXIX Olympiad
- Venue: Beijing University of Technology Gymnasium
- Date: 12–16 August 2008
- Competitors: 32 from 10 nations

Medalists
| 1st place, gold medalist(s) | | Markis Kido; Hendra Setiawan | Indonesia |
| 2nd place, silver medalist(s) | | Cai Yun; Fu Haifeng | China |
| 3rd place, bronze medalist(s) | | Hwang Ji-man; Lee Jae-jin | South Korea |

The badminton men's doubles tournament at the 2008 Olympic Games in Beijing took place from 12–16 August at Beijing University of Technology Gymnasium.

Indonesia's Markis Kido and Hendra Setiawan defeated China's Cai Yun and Fu Haifeng in the final, 12–21, 21–11, 21–16, to win the gold medal in men's doubles badminton at the 2008 Summer Olympics. The pair won Indonesia's first gold medal in Olympics badminton.

The tournament consisted of a single-elimination tournament. Matches were played using a best-of-three games format. Games were played to 21 points, using rally scoring. Each game had to be won by a margin of two points, except when the game was won by a player who reached 30 even if the lead was only 1 at that point.

The top four seeds in the tournament were placed in the bracket so as not to face each other until the semifinals. All other competitors were placed by draw.

== Seeds ==
1. Markis Kido and Hendra Setiawan (INA) (gold medalists)
2. Fu Haifeng and Cai Yun (CHN) (silver medalists)
3. Jung Jae-sung and Lee Yong-dae (KOR) (first round)
4. Choong Tan Fook and Lee Wan Wah (MAS) (first round)

== Draw ==
First round
1 | Markis Kido (INA); Hendra Setiawan (INA) | 22 | 10 | 21
Guo Zhendong (CHN); Xie Zhongbo (CHN) | 20 | 21 | 17
Koo Kien Keat (MAS); Tan Boon Heong (MAS) | 21 | 21
Shuichi Sakamoto (JPN); Shintaro Ikeda (JPN) | 12 | 16
3 | Jung Jae-sung (KOR); Lee Yong-dae (KOR) | 16 | 19
Lars Paaske (DEN); Jonas Rasmussen (DEN) | 21 | 21
Michał Łogosz (POL); Robert Mateusiak (POL) | 21 | 21
Glenn Warfe (AUS); Ross Smith (AUS) | 13 | 16
Luluk Hadiyanto (INA); Alvent Yulianto (INA) | 21 | 14 | 14
Tadashi Ohtsuka (JPN); Keita Masuda (JPN) | 19 | 21 | 21
Lee Jae-jin (KOR); Hwang Ji-man (KOR) | 20 | 21 | 21
4 | Choong Tan Fook (MAS); Lee Wan Wah (MAS) | 22 | 13 | 16
Roelof Dednam (RSA); Chris Dednam (RSA) | 10 | 16
Howard Bach (USA); Bob Malaythong (USA) | 21 | 21
Jens Eriksen (DEN); Martin Lundgaard Hansen (DEN) | 12 | 11
2 | Fu Haifeng (CHN); Cai Yun (CHN) | 21 | 21

Quarter-finals
1 | Markis Kido (INA); Hendra Setiawan (INA) | 21 | 21
Koo Kien Keat (MAS); Tan Boon Heong (MAS) | 16 | 18
Lars Paaske (DEN); Jonas Rasmussen (DEN) | 17 | 21 | 21
Michał Łogosz (POL); Robert Mateusiak (POL) | 21 | 11 | 15
Tadashi Ohtsuka (JPN); Keita Masuda (JPN) | 12 | 21 | 9
Lee Jae-jin (KOR); Hwang Ji-man (KOR) | 21 | 18 | 21
Howard Bach (USA); Bob Malaythong (USA) | 9 | 10
2 | Fu Haifeng (CHN); Cai Yun (CHN) | 21 | 21

Semi-finals
1 | Markis Kido (INA); Hendra Setiawan (INA) | 21 | 21
Lars Paaske (DEN); Jonas Rasmussen (DEN) | 19 | 17
Lee Jae-jin (KOR); Hwang Ji-man (KOR) | 20 | 8
2 | Fu Haifeng (CHN); Cai Yun (CHN) | 22 | 21

Final
1 | Markis Kido (INA); Hendra Setiawan (INA) | 12 | 21 | 21
2 | Fu Haifeng (CHN); Cai Yun (CHN) | 21 | 11 | 16
Third place
Lars Paaske (DEN); Jonas Rasmussen (DEN) | 21 | 18 | 17
Lee Jae-jin (KOR); Hwang Ji-man (KOR) | 13 | 21 | 21
