= Indonesia at the 2008 Summer Olympics =

- IOC code: INA
- NOC: Indonesian Olympic Committee
- Website: www.nocindonesia.or.id (in Indonesian)

in Beijing
- Competitors: 24 in 7 sports
- Flag bearer: I Gusti Made Oka Sulaksana
- Officials: Rosihan Rasyad (Chief de Mission)
- Medals Ranked 40th: Gold 1 Silver 1 Bronze 4 Total 6

Summer Olympics appearances (overview)
- 1952; 1956; 1960; 1964; 1968; 1972; 1976; 1980; 1984; 1988; 1992; 1996; 2000; 2004; 2008; 2012; 2016; 2020; 2024

Indonesia competed in the 2008 Summer Olympics, held in Beijing, People's Republic of China from August 8 to August 24, 2008. At the games, twenty-two Indonesians had qualified to compete, while the other three had been granted a wildcard entry.

== Medalists ==
Medal	Name	Sport	Event	Date
Gold	Markis Kido; Hendra Setiawan	Badminton	Men's doubles	16 August
Silver	Nova Widianto; Liliyana Natsir	Badminton	Mixed doubles	17 August
Bronze	Raema Lisa Rumbewas	Weightlifting	Women's 53 kg	10 August
Bronze	Eko Yuli Irawan	Weightlifting	Men's 56 kg	10 August
Bronze	Triyatno	Weightlifting	Men's 62 kg	11 August
Bronze	Maria Kristin Yulianti	Badminton	Women's singles	16 August

Medals by sport
Sport	1st place, gold medalist(s)	2nd place, silver medalist(s)	3rd place, bronze medalist(s)	Total
Badminton	1	1	1	3
Weightlifting	0	0	3	3
Total	1	1	4	6

Medals by gender
Gender	1st place, gold medalist(s)	2nd place, silver medalist(s)	3rd place, bronze medalist(s)	Total
Female	0	0	2	2
Male	1	0	2	3
Mixed	0	1	0	1
Total	1	1	4	6

Medals by date
Date	1st place, gold medalist(s)	2nd place, silver medalist(s)	3rd place, bronze medalist(s)	Total
10 August	0	0	2	2
11 August	0	0	1	1
16 August	1	0	1	2
17 August	0	1	0	1
Total	1	1	4	6

== Competitors ==
The following is the list of number of competitors participating in the Games:

Sport	Men	Women	Total
Archery	0	2	2
Athletics	1	1	2
Badminton	8	3	11
Sailing	1	0	1
Shooting	0	1	1
Swimming	1	1	2
Weightlifting	4	1	5
Total	15	9	24

== Archery ==
Indonesia will send archers to the Olympics for the ninth time, seeking the nation's first Olympic gold medal in the sport and first archery medal of any kind since earning the silver in the 1988 women's team competition. Ika Yuliana Rochmawati and Rina Dewi Puspitasari earned Indonesia two spots in the women's individual competition by placing first and third at the 2008 Asian championships.

Women

Rina Dewi Puspitasari competed in women's individual archery at the Beijing Olympics as a representative of Indonesia. Born in Bojonegoro Regency, a rural region on Java to the west of the eastern coastal metropolis Surabaya, she first competed in the Olympics at the 2004 Athens Games when she was 18 years old. Puspitasari competed in the women's individual event for the first time here, finishing in 46th place. Her appearance in Beijing marked her second Olympic appearance. During the course of the August 9 preliminary round, Puspitasari competed against 63 other athletes. During the first half of this first round, the Indonesian archer accumulated 317 points; in the second half, she accrued an additional 303, bringing her total score to 620. Puspitasari scored a total of 19 bullseyes, but missed six targets entirely. On August 11, Puspitasari advanced to the August 11 one-of-thirty-two elimination round; she competed in the 27th match, facing Russia's Miroslava Dagbaeva. Both earned 106 points during this round, with Puspitasari scoring four bullseyes; during the tiebreaker portion, she scored nine points to Dagbaeva's 10. Puspitasari was defeated and did not advance to later rounds.

Athlete	Event	Ranking round		Round of 64	Round of 32	Round of 16	Quarterfinals	Semifinals	Final / BM	
Athlete	Event	Score	Seed	Opposition Score	Opposition Score	Opposition Score	Opposition Score	Opposition Score	Opposition Score	Rank
Rina Dewi Puspitasari	Individual	620	42	Dagbaeva (RUS) (23); L 106 (9)–106 (10)	Did not advance					
Ika Yuliana Rochmawati	Individual	621	41	Nichols (USA) (24); L 101–114	Did not advance					

== Athletics ==
Key

- Note–Ranks given for track events are within the athlete's heat only
- Q = Qualified for the next round
- q = Qualified for the next round as a fastest loser or, in field events, by position without achieving the qualifying target
- NR = National record
- N/A = Round not applicable for the event
- Bye = Athlete not required to compete in round

Men

Suryo Agung Wibowo represented Indonesia at the 2008 Summer Olympics in the men's 100 meters dash. Born in Surakarta in central Java, Wibowo was 24 years old at the time of his event in Beijing. During the August 14 qualification round, Wibowo raced seven other athletes in the third heat. He finished the event in 10.46 seconds. He seventh ahead, of Jared Lewis of Saint Vincent and the Grenadines (11.00 seconds) and behind Andrew Hinds of Barbados (10.35 seconds) in a heat led by Richard Thompson of Trinidad and Tobago (10.24 seconds) and France's Martial Mbandjock (10.26 seconds). Overall, he ranked 41st out of 80 athletes, tying Nigeria's Uchenna Emedolu. He did not advance to later rounds.

Athlete	Event	Heat		Quarterfinal		Semifinal		Final	
Athlete	Event	Result	Rank	Result	Rank	Result	Rank	Result	Rank
Suryo Agung Wibowo	100 m	10.46	6	Did not advance					

Women

Dedeh Erawati was the only female athlete representing Indonesia in track events while at the Beijing Olympics. She participated in the women's 100 meters hurdles. Born in Sumedang, a western Javanese city within the vicinity of the major metropolis Bandung, Erawati was 28 years old at the time of her participation in Beijing. She had not previously competed in any Olympic games. During the course of the preliminary round of the races, which took place on August 17, Erawati competed in the fifth heat against seven other athletes. She finished seventh of the seven athletes who finished the event in her heat, running the event in a time of 13.49 seconds. While the slowest in her heat, she placed ahead of Guinea's Fatmata Fofanah, who did not finish the event. Haiti's Nadine Faustin placed sixth (13.25 seconds), directly ahead of Erawati, in a heat led by Jamaica's Brigitte Foster-Hylton (12.69 seconds) and the United States' Dawn Harper (12.73 seconds). Of the 40 athletes competing in the event, Erawati placed 34th. She did not advance to later rounds.

Athlete	Event	Heat		Semifinal		Final	
Athlete	Event	Result	Rank	Result	Rank	Result	Rank
Dedeh Erawati	100 m hurdles	13.49	7	Did not advance			

== Badminton ==
Men

Taufik Hidayat represented Indonesia in singles badminton at the Beijing Olympics. Born in Bandung, a major city in western Java, in 1981, Hidayat first represented Indonesia at the 2000 Summer Olympics in Sydney, Australia at the age of 19. At these games, he was the top seed and was expected to progress to finals, but lost in quarterfinals. He returned at the 2004 Olympics in Athens and won the event's gold medal. Hidayat's appearance in Beijing marked his third, but not final, Olympic appearance. During these games, the Indonesian athlete faced Malaysia's Wong Choong Hann in the Round of 32 (the first round) in the seventh match. The Malaysian defeated the Indonesian 21–19 and 21–16. Hidayat did not progress to further rounds.

Sony Dwi Kuncoro also competed for Indonesia in men's singles badminton. He was born in Surabaya in 1984, and was 20 years old when he first competed at the Olympic games in Athens in 2004. During this competition, Kuncoro won the bronze medal. When he returned to the Olympics four years later, Kuncoro was 24 years old. During the August 10 round of 32, the Indonesian was placed in the fourteenth match against Thailand's Boonsak Ponsana. He defeated him 21–16 and 21–14; Kuncoro advanced to the next round. On August 11, Kuncoro faced Finland's Ville Lang in the seventh match of the round of 16. The Indonesian badminton player won 21–13 and 21–18, defeating Lang as well and sending Kuncoro to the quarterfinal round. At that time, Malaysia's Lee Chong Wei challenged Kuncoro in the fourth match and defeated him after winning 21–9 and 21–11. Chong would eventually continue to win the silver medal.

Athlete	Event	Round of 64	Round of 32	Round of 16	Quarterfinal	Semifinal	Final / BM	
Athlete	Event	Opposition Score	Opposition Score	Opposition Score	Opposition Score	Opposition Score	Opposition Score	Rank
Taufik Hidayat	Singles	Bye	Wong (MAS); L 19–21, 16–21	Did not advance				
Sony Dwi Kuncoro	Singles	Bye	Ponsana (THA); W 21–16, 21–14	Lång (FIN); W 21–13, 21–18	Lee (MAS); L 9–21, 11–21	Did not advance		
Luluk Hadiyanto; Alvent Yulianto	Doubles	—N/a		Masuda / Ohtsuka (JPN); L 21–19, 14–21, 14–21	Did not advance			
Markis Kido; Hendra Setiawan	Doubles	—N/a		Guo / Xie (CHN); W 22–20, 10–21, 21–17	Koo / Tan (MAS); W 21–16, 21–18	Paaske / Rasmussen (DEN); W 21–19, 21–17	Cai / Fu (CHN); W 12–21, 21–11, 21–16	1st place, gold medalist(s)

Women

Athlete	Event	Round of 64	Round of 32	Round of 16	Quarterfinal	Semifinal	Final / BM	
Athlete	Event	Opposition Score	Opposition Score	Opposition Score	Opposition Score	Opposition Score	Opposition Score	Rank
Maria Kristin Yulianti	Singles	Schenk (GER); W 18–21, 21–13, 22–20	Martínez (ESP); W 21–9, 21–14	Rasmussen (DEN); W 18–21, 21–19, 21–14	Nehwal (IND); W 26–28, 21–14, 21–15	Zhang (CHN); L 15–21, 15–21	Lu (CHN); W 11–21, 21–13, 21–15	3rd place, bronze medalist(s)
Vita Marissa; Liliyana Natsir	Doubles	—N/a		Yang / Zhang (CHN); L 19–21, 15–21	Did not advance			

Mixed

Athlete	Event	Round of 16	Quarterfinal	Semifinal	Final / BM	
Athlete	Event	Opposition Score	Opposition Score	Opposition Score	Opposition Score	Rank
Flandy Limpele; Vita Marissa	Doubles	Hopp / Overzier (GER); W 21–12, 21–12	Laybourn / Rytter Juhl (DEN); W 21–17, 15–21, 21–17	Lee / Lee (KOR); L 9–21, 21–12, 17–21	He / Yu (CHN); L 21–19, 17–21, 21–23	4
Nova Widianto; Liliyana Natsir	Doubles	Han / Hwang (KOR); W 23–21, 21–19	Prapakamol / Thoungthongkam (THA); W 21–13, 21–19	He / Yu (CHN); W 15–21, 21–11, 23–21	Lee / Lee (KOR); L 11–21, 17–21	2nd place, silver medalist(s)

== Sailing ==
Men

I Gusti Made Oka Sulaksana, known also as Oka Sulaksana, was Indonesia's only sailor at the Beijing Olympics. He participated in the men's windsurfer event. Born in Sanur, a town on the island of Bali nearby the island's capital city Denpasar, Sulaksana has been affiliated with the Sanur Windsurfing Center's programs and first participated Olympically at the 1996 Atlanta games, when he was 25 years old. He has since participated at the 2000 Sydney and 2004 Athens games, competing at Beijing as a 37-year-old. The Indonesian athlete placed 24th in the first race of the event, 24th in the second race, 23rd in the third race, 27th in the fourth, 22nd in the fifth, 31st in the sixth, 28th in the seventh, and 30th in the eighth. During the ninth and final race, Sulaksana did not finish, earning 36 points. In total, Sulaksana ranked 27th out of the 35 windsurfers, scoring a total of 225 points. He placed ahead of Belarus' Mikalai Zhukavets (229 points) and behind the United States' Benjamin Barger (217 points). In comparison, gold medalist Tom Ashley of New Zealand scored 52 points, and Colombia's 35th place finalist Santiago Grillo scored 293 points.

Athlete	Event	Race											Net points	Final rank
Athlete	Event	1	2	3	4	5	6	7	8	9	10	M*	Net points	Final rank
I Gusti Made Oka Sulaksana	RS:X	24	24	23	27	22	31	28	30	~~36~~	16	EL	225	27

M = Medal race; EL = Eliminated – did not advance into the medal race; CAN = Race cancelled;

== Shooting ==
Women

Yosheefin Shila Prasasti competed on Indonesia's behalf as the country's only shooter. She represented Indonesia in the women's air rifle 10 meters. Born in the Sleman Regency in the outer reaches of Yogyakarta in central Java, Prasasti first participated in the Olympic games while 22 years old in Athens at the 2004 Olympics. She competed at Beijing at 26 years old. Facing 46 other athletes during the course of the August 8 event, Prasasti earned 97 points in the first round; 98 in the second; 98 in the third; and 100 in the last. Her overall score was 393. Overall, Yosheefin Prasasti finished in 24th place between Egypt's Shimaa Hashad (23rd place) and Poland's Agnieszka Staron (26th place). The gold medalist in the event, the Czech Republic's Katerina Emmons, earned 502.5 points in comparison.

Athlete	Event	Qualification		Final	
Athlete	Event	Points	Rank	Points	Rank
Yosheefin Prasasti	10 m air rifle	393	24	Did not advance	

== Swimming ==
Men

Donny Budiarto Utomo represented Indonesia in swimming at the Beijing Olympics, participating in the men's 200 meters butterfly. Born in 1979, Utomo was 25 years old when he debuted at the Olympic games, participating in the same event at the 2004 Summer Olympics in Athens, Greece; he placed 33rd overall. He returned to the Olympics at age 29 when at Beijing. During the preliminary round of the event, which took place on August 11, Utomo competed in the eight-person second heat. He finished last with a time of 2:03.44, placing directly behind seventh-place finalist Vladan Markovic of Serbia (2:03.12) and sixth-place finalist Douglas Lennox-Silva of Puerto Rico (2:01.69) in a heat led by James Walsh of the Philippines (1:59.39) and Spain's Javier Núñez (2:00.24). Of the 44 athletes who competed in the event, Utomo ranked last. He did not advance to the next round.

Athlete	Event	Heat		Semifinal		Final	
Athlete	Event	Time	Rank	Time	Rank	Time	Rank
Donny Utomo	200 m butterfly	2:03.44	44	Did not advance			

Women

Fibriani Ratna Marita competed for Indonesia as its only female swimmer at the Beijing Olympics. She competed in the women's 200 meters individual medley event. Born in the city of Malang, which lies in east Java, Marita competed at Beijing at the age of 14. She was the youngest member of the Indonesian delegation that year, and had not previously participated in any Olympic events. During the course of the preliminary races, which took place on August 11, Marita competed in the first heat (which included seven athletes in total). Of those, she ranked sixth of the six finishing athletes with a time of 2:28.18, behind Chinese Taipei's Lin Man-Hsu in fifth place (2:23.29) and Iceland's Erla Dogg Haraldsdottir in fourth place (2:20.53). The heat itself was led by Ukraine's Hanna Dzerkal (2:18.25) and Colombia's Erika Stewart (2:18.54), while Tunisia's Maroua Mathlouthi was the only member of the heat who did not finish. Overall, Marita placed last of the 38 finishing athletes. She did not advance to later rounds.

Athlete	Event	Heat		Semifinal		Final	
Athlete	Event	Time	Rank	Time	Rank	Time	Rank
Fibriani Ratna Marita	200 m individual medley	2:28.18	38	Did not advance			

== Weightlifting ==
Men

Sandow Weldemar Nasution competed for Indonesia in weightlifting while at Beijing. He competed in the men's middleweight class, which includes athletes of and below 77 kilograms in weight. Born in the capital city of Jakarta, Nasution was 27 years old at the time of the Beijing Olympics, and had not previously competed in any Olympic events. During the course of the event, which took place on August 13, Sandow Nasution competed against 28 other athletes. The first phase of the event involved snatches; Nasution successfully attempted lift three times, successively raising 145 kilograms; 152 kilograms; and 153 kilograms in this manner. During the clean and jerk phrase, Nasution successfully lifted 185 kilograms and then 194 kilograms, but did not succeed in lifting 200 kilograms. The sum of his overall score was 347 kilograms. Of the 24 athletes who finished the event, Nasution finished in 11th place between 10th place finalist Siarhei Lahun of Belarus (349 kilograms) and 12th place finalist Mahmoud Elhaddad of Egypt (347 kilograms). The gold medalist, Sa Jaehyouk of South Korea, in comparison, lifted a combined 366 kilograms.

Edi Kurniawan competed on Indonesia's behalf at the Beijing Olympics, participating in the events pertaining to the lightweight class, which includes people of 69 kilograms in weight or lower. Born in Lampung province in southern Sumatra, Kurniawan was 20 years old at the time of his participation at the Beijing Olympics. He had not previously competed at any Olympic games. During the August 12 competition, Kurniawan competed against 33 other athletes. During snatches, the Indonesian weightlifter successfully lifted 135 kilograms in weight on his first attempt, but unsuccessfully lifted 140 kilograms on his second and third attempts. Later, during the clean and jerk lifts, Kurniawan successfully completed a lift all three times (165 kilograms on his first attempt, 170 kilograms on his second, and 172 kilograms on his last). His total score was 307 kilograms. This placed him in 12th place out of the 24 finishing athletes between 11th place finalist Tarek Abdelazim of Egypt (310 kilograms) and 13th place finalist Israel Jose Rubio Rivero of Venezuela (306 kilograms). In comparison, gold medalist Liao Hui of China lifted 348 kilograms.

Triyatno represented Indonesia in weightlifting while at the Beijing Olympics. He participated in the featherweight class, which encompasses athletes who weigh at or less than 62 kilograms. Born in Metro City, a large settlement located in the southern Sumatran province of Lampung, Triyatno participated in the Beijing Olympics at 20 years old. He did not previously participate in any Olympic games. The event took place on August 11, where Triyatno faced 16 other athletes. The weightlifter successfully lifted 133 kilograms during his first attempt at snatches, unsuccessfully attempted 135 kilograms on his second, and successfully pulled that weight on his third attempt. He then failed to pull 163 kilograms on his first and second attempts during the clean and jerk phase, but successfully lifted this weight on his final try. His overall score was 298 kilograms, a combination of his highest snatch (135) and clean and jerk (163). With his score, the Indonesian won the bronze medal in the event out of the 12 athletes who finished. He placed behind Colombia's Diego Salazar, who won the silver medal (305 kilograms) and ahead of Romania's Antoniu Buci, who took fourth place (295 kilograms). In comparison, China's gold medalist Zhang Xiangxiang lifted a total of 319 kilograms.

Eko Yuli Irawan represented Indonesia at weightlifting in the Beijing Olympics, competing in the bantamweight class (which includes athletes below 56 kilograms in weight). Born in Metro in southern Sumatra, Irawan was 19 years old at the time of his participation at the Beijing Olympics. He had not previously competed at any Olympic games. During the course of the August 10 event, Irawan faced 18 other athletes. He first was given three opportunities to complete snatches, successfully raising 125 kilograms on his first attempt; unsuccessfully attempting to lift 130 kilograms on his second attempt; and successfully lifting that load on his last try. During the clean and jerk lifts, Irawan successfully lifted 152 kilograms on his first attempt; 158 kilograms on his second; and 158 kilograms on his last. As his highest scores were 130 (snatch) and 158 (clean and jerk), Irawan's total score was 288 kilograms. This score won the Indonesian weightlifter the bronze medal in the event, placing him behind silver medalist Hoang Anh Tuan of Vietnam (290 kilograms) and gold medalist Long Qingquan of China (292 kilograms) and ahead of fourth-place finalist Yang Chin-Yi of Chinese Taipei (285 kilograms).

Women

Raema Lisa Rumbewas was the only female weightlifter representing Indonesia at the Beijing Olympics. Born in Jayapura, the capital of the easternmost Indonesian province of Papua, she first participated in the Olympics at age 19 at the 2000 Summer Olympics in Sydney, Australia as a flyweight weightlifter. She won silver in the event, and did so again at the 2004 Athens Olympics in the featherweight category. Rumbewas returned to the Olympics, in Beijing, at the age of 27. During the course of her event, which took place on August 10, there were nine participants. During snatches, Rumbewas successfully lifted 91 kilograms on her first attempt, then unsuccessfully attempted 95 kilograms on her second and third attempts. She successfully lifted 110 kilograms and then 115 kilograms in clean and jerk, but failed to lift 121 kilograms on her final try. As her highest lifts were 91 (snatch) and 115 (clean and jerk), her total final score was 206 kilograms. Overall, she ranked fourth ahead of fourth-place finalist Yudelquis Maridalin of the Dominican Republic (204 kilograms) and behind bronze medalist Nastassia Novikava of Belarus (213 kilograms). In comparison, gold medalist Prapawadee Jaroenrattanatarakoon of Thailand lifted a total of 221 kilograms.

Summary

Athlete	Event	Snatch		Clean & Jerk		Total	Rank
Athlete	Event	Result	Rank	Result	Rank	Total	Rank
Eko Yuli Irawan	Men's −56 kg	130	2	158	3	288	3rd place, bronze medalist(s)
Triyatno	Men's −62 kg	135	5	163	4	298	3rd place, bronze medalist(s)
Edi Kurniawan	Men's −69 kg	135	15	172	9	307	12
Sandow Nasution	Men's −77 kg	153	13	194	6	347	11
Raema Lisa Rumbewas	Women's −53 kg	91	5	115	4	206	3rd place, bronze medalist(s)

== See also ==
- 2008 Olympic Games
- 2008 Paralympic Games
- Indonesia at the Olympics
- Indonesia at the Paralympics
- Indonesia at the 2008 Summer Paralympics
