= Badminton at the 2008 Summer Olympics – Women's doubles =

Women's doubles at the Games of the XXIX Olympiad
- Venue: Beijing University of Technology Gymnasium
- Date: 10 August to 15 August 2012
- Competitors: 32 from 12 nations

Medalists
1st place, gold medalist(s)		Du Jing; Yu Yang	China
2nd place, silver medalist(s)		Lee Hyo-jung; Lee Kyung-won	South Korea
3rd place, bronze medalist(s)		Wei Yili; Zhang Yawen	China

These are the results of the women's doubles competition in badminton at the 2008 Summer Olympics in Beijing. Two duos playing for China took the gold and bronze medals, while South Korea took silver in the tournament.

China's Du Jing and Yu Yang defeated South Korea's Lee Hyo-jung and Lee Kyung-won in the final, 21–15, 21–13, to win the gold medal in women's doubles badminton at the 2008 Summer Olympics. The pair won China's fourth consecutive gold medal in women's doubles badminton. In the bronze-medal match, China's Wei Yili and Zhang Yawen defeated Japan's Miyuki Maeda and Satoko Suetsuna, 21–17, 21–10.

The tournament consisted of a single-elimination tournament. Matches were played using a best-of-three games format. Games were played to 21 points, using rally scoring. Each game had to be won by two points, except when the game was won by a player who reached 30 even if the lead was only 1 at that point.

The top four seeds in the tournament were placed in the bracket so as not to face each other until the semifinals. All other competitors were placed by draw.

== Seeds ==
1. Yang Wei and Zhang Jiewen (CHN) (quarter-finals)
2. Du Jing and Yu Yang (CHN) (gold medalists)
3. Wei Yili and Zhang Yawen (CHN) (bronze medalists)
4. Lee Hyo-jung and Lee Kyung-won (KOR) (silver medalists)

== Draw ==
First round
1	Yang Wei (CHN); Zhang Jiewen (CHN)	21	21
Liliyana Natsir (INA); Vita Marissa (INA)	19	15
Tania Luiz (AUS); Eugenia Tanaka (AUS)	4	8
Miyuki Maeda (JPN); Satoko Suetsuna (JPN)	21	21
4	Lee Hyo-jung (KOR); Lee Kyung-won (KOR)	21	21
Chin Eei Hui (MAS); Wong Pei Tty (MAS)	14	19
Eva Lee (USA); Mesinee Mangkalakiri (USA)	12	12
Jiang Yanmei (SIN); Li Yujia (SIN)	21	21
Chantal Botts (RSA); Michelle Edwards (RSA)	6	12
Cheng Wen-hsing (TPE); Chien Yu-chin (TPE)	21	21
Gail Emms (GBR); Donna Kellogg (GBR)	19	13
3	Wei Yili (CHN); Zhang Yawen (CHN)	21	21
Lena Frier Kristiansen (DEN); Kamilla Rytter Juhl (DEN)	21	14	18
Kumiko Ogura (JPN); Reiko Shiota (JPN)	18	21	21
Ha Jung-eun (KOR); Kim Min-jung (KOR)	11	21	15
2	Du Jing (CHN); Yu Yang (CHN)	21	16	21

Quarter-finals
1	Yang Wei (CHN); Zhang Jiewen (CHN)	21	21	14
Miyuki Maeda (JPN); Satoko Suetsuna (JPN)	8	23	21
4	Lee Hyo-jung (KOR); Lee Kyung-won (KOR)	21	21
Jiang Yanmei (SIN); Li Yujia (SIN)	15	12
Cheng Wen-hsing (TPE); Chien Yu-chin (TPE)	14	18
3	Wei Yili (CHN); Zhang Yawen (CHN)	21	21
Kumiko Ogura (JPN); Reiko Shiota (JPN)	8	5
2	Du Jing (CHN); Yu Yang (CHN)	21	21

Semi-finals
Miyuki Maeda (JPN); Satoko Suetsuna (JPN)	20	15
4	Lee Hyo-jung (KOR); Lee Kyung-won (KOR)	22	21
3	Wei Yili (CHN); Zhang Yawen (CHN)	19	12
2	Du Jing (CHN); Yu Yang (CHN)	21	21

Final
4	Lee Hyo-jung (KOR); Lee Kyung-won (KOR)	15	13
2	Du Jing (CHN); Yu Yang (CHN)	21	21
Third place
Miyuki Maeda (JPN); Satoko Suetsuna (JPN)	17	10
3	Wei Yili (CHN); Zhang Yawen (CHN)	21	21
