= Badminton at the 2008 Summer Olympics – Mixed doubles =

Mixed doubles at the Games of the XXIX Olympiad
- Venue: Beijing University of Technology Gymnasium
- Date: 12 August to 17 August 2008
- Competitors: 32 from 12 nations

Medalists
1st place, gold medalist(s)		Lee Yong-dae; Lee Hyo-jung	South Korea
2nd place, silver medalist(s)		Nova Widianto; Liliyana Natsir	Indonesia
3rd place, bronze medalist(s)		He Hanbin; Yu Yang	China

These are the results of the mixed doubles competition in badminton at the 2008 Summer Olympics in Beijing.

The tournament consisted of a single-elimination tournament. Matches were played using a best-of-three games format. Games were played to 21 points, using rally scoring. Each game had to be won by a margin of two points, except when the game was won by a player who reached 30 even if the lead was only 1 at that point.

The top four seeds in the tournament were placed in the bracket so as not to face each other until the semifinals. All other competitors were placed by draw.

== Seeds ==
1. Nova Widianto and Liliyana Natsir (INA) (silver medallists)
2. Zheng Bo and Gao Ling (CHN) (first round)
3. Flandy Limpele and Vita Marissa (INA) (fourth place)
4. He Hanbin and Yu Yang (CHN) (bronze medallists)

== Draw ==
First Round
1	Nova Widianto (INA); Liliyana Natsir (INA)	23	21
Han Sang-hoon (KOR); Hwang Yu-mi (KOR)	21	19
Sudket Prapakamol (THA); Saralee Thoungthongkam (THA)	21	21
Mike Beres (CAN); Valerie Loker (CAN)	9	9
4	He Hanbin (CHN); Yu Yang (CHN)	21	21
Anthony Clark (GBR); Donna Kellogg (GBR)	15	8
Robert Mateusiak (POL); Nadieżda Kostiuczyk (POL)	21	21
Georgie Cupidon (SEY); Juliette Ah-Wan (SEY)	8	19
Thomas Laybourn (DEN); Kamilla Rytter Juhl (DEN)	21	21
Hendri Kurniawan Saputra (SIN); Li Yujia (SIN)	12	14
Kristof Hopp (GER); Birgit Overzier (GER)	12	12
3	Flandy Limpele (INA); Vita Marissa (INA)	21	21
Craig Cooper (NZL); Renee Flavell (NZL)	12	11
Lee Yong-dae (KOR); Lee Hyo-jung (KOR)	21	21
Nathan Robertson (GBR); Gail Emms (GBR)	21	16	21
2	Zheng Bo (CHN); Gao Ling (CHN)	16	21	19

Quarter-finals
1	Nova Widianto (INA); Liliyana Natsir (INA)	21	21
Sudket Prapakamol (THA); Saralee Thoungthongkam (THA)	13	19
4	He Hanbin (CHN); Yu Yang (CHN)	22	23
Robert Mateusiak (POL); Nadieżda Kostiuczyk (POL)	20	21
Thomas Laybourn (DEN); Kamilla Rytter Juhl (DEN)	17	21	17
3	Flandy Limpele (INA); Vita Marissa (INA)	21	15	21
Lee Yong-dae (KOR); Lee Hyo-jung (KOR)	21	21
Nathan Robertson (GBR); Gail Emms (GBR)	19	12

Semi-finals
1	Nova Widianto (INA); Liliyana Natsir (INA)	15	21	23
4	He Hanbin (CHN); Yu Yang (CHN)	21	11	21
3	Flandy Limpele (INA); Vita Marissa (INA)	9	21	17
Lee Yong-dae (KOR); Lee Hyo-jung (KOR)	21	12	21

Final
1	Nova Widianto (INA); Liliyana Natsir (INA)	11	17
Lee Yong-dae (KOR); Lee Hyo-jung (KOR)	21	21
Third place
4	He Hanbin (CHN); Yu Yang (CHN)	19	21	23
3	Flandy Limpele (INA); Vita Marissa (INA)	21	17	21
