= Hsieh Yu-hsing =

Taiwanese badminton player

Hsieh Yu-hsing 謝裕興
Personal information
- Born: July 23, 1983 (age 43) Kaohsiung, Taiwan
- Height: 1.75 m (5 ft 9 in)

Sport
- Country: Republic of China (Taiwan)
- Sport: Badminton
- Handedness: Right

Men's singles & Mixed doubles
- Highest ranking: 13 (June 2009)
- Current ranking: 35 (December 2010)
- BWF profile
Medal record
Badminton
Representing Chinese Taipei
East Asian Games
Bronze medal – third place	2009 Hong Kong	Men's team
Summer Universiade
Silver medal – second place	2007 Bangkok	Men's doubles
Bronze medal – third place	2007 Bangkok	Mixed team

Hsieh Yu-hsing (simplified Chinese: 谢裕兴; traditional Chinese: 謝裕興; pinyin: Xiè Yùxīng; born July 23, 1983) is an international badminton player from Chinese Taipei (Taiwan), competing in men's singles and mixed doubles.

== Career ==
=== 2008 ===
He was a surprise in the men's singles tournament at the Beijing 2008 Olympics. He defeated Kaveh Mehrabi of Iran 21-16, 21-12 in the first round, Nguyen Tien Minh of Vietnam 21-16, 15-21, 21-15 in the second round, and Wong Choong Hann of Malaysia 14-21, 21-17, 21-18 in the third round. Hsieh was stopped by Chen Jin of China 8-21, 14-21 in the quarter-finals.

After the Olympics, he participated in the Chinese Taipei Open, competing in both singles and doubles events, but was eliminated in the third round of each. A few days later, he competed in the Japan Open Super Series, taking part in men's singles, men's doubles, and mixed doubles.

=== 2009 ===
Hsieh attended the Badminton Proton Malaysia Open, held in Kuala Lumpur in January. He was knocked out in the first round of the mixed doubles. In the men's singles, he lost in the semi-finals 13–21, 14–21 to South Korean Park Sung-hwan.

In March, Hsieh competed in the Badminton All England Open, where he lost to Indonesia's top players in the first round of both singles and doubles. He then participated in the Wilson Swiss Open, reaching the second round in mixed doubles and the quarter-finals in singles. In the singles event, he defeated India's Chetan Anand 9-21, 22-20, 21-17 in the second round but was eliminated by China's Lin Dan 16-21, 14-21 in the quarter-finals. In early April, he went to Osaka to compete in both singles and doubles to earn points and improve his world ranking.

Hsieh competed only in the men's singles at the Singapore Open held in June, where he lost to Indonesia's Sony Dwi Kuncoro 15-21, 15-21 in the second round. He then participated in the Indonesian Open also in singles, and was defeated by China's Lin Dan 12-21, 12-21 in the second round. In August, Hsieh competed in the Macau Open Grand Prix Gold, where he was eliminated in the quarter-finals by Indonesia's Taufik Hidayat with a score of 16-21, 14-21.

At the Chinese Taipei Open, Hsieh lost to Thailand's Tanongsak Saensomboonsuk 17-21, 21-17, 20-22. In the Li Ning China Open, he was defeated by China's Lin Dan 15-21, 19-21 in the second round. At the Japan Open, he lost to Indonesian Simon Santoso 18-21, 6-21 in the first round. In November, Hsieh competed in both singles and doubles at the Hong Kong Open Super Series. He lost to a Malaysian mixed doubles pair in the qualification match and was later defeated 13-21, 9-21 by Indonesia's Dionysius Hayom Rumbaka in the second round.

After that, Hsieh returned to the China Open, competing only in men's singles. He was defeated by Chen Jin of China 14-21, 5-21 in the second round. In December, he participated in the BWF World Super Series Masters Competition in Johor Bahru, Malaysia. He was only beaten by former Olympic Champion Taufik Hidayat of Indonesia, who won 21-17, 21-15 in the final round. In the first round, Hsieh lost to world number one Lee Chong Wei 11-21, 12-21, and in the second round, he was defeated by Chinese player Bao Chunlai 21-17, 8-21, 16-21.

=== 2010 ===
In 2010, Hsieh struggled in many tournaments, often losing in the first round to younger players from various countries, except at the Macau Open Grand Prix Gold. At the Macau Open, he reached the quarter-finals once again, where he was defeated by Lee Hyun-il of Korea, the same player who had beaten him at the 2008 Olympics.

In November, Hsieh represented Taiwan at the 2010 Asian Games in Guangzhou. In the men's team competition round of 16, he defeated India's Arvind Bhat 28-26, 15-21, 21-13, contributing to a 3-1 win for Chinese Taipei over India. However, the team lost to Indonesia in the quarter-finals, with Hsieh losing his match 21-11, 8-21, 12-21 to Indonesian star Taufik Hidayat.

Later, in the individual men's singles competition, Hsieh faced Indonesia's No. 1 player, Taufik Hidayat, and lost 16-21, 12-21 in the first round. In December, Hsieh participated in the China Open Super Series in Shanghai. He showed some improvement by defeating Christian Lind Thomsen of Denmark with a score of 18-21, 21-3, 21-16. However, he was once again stopped by China's Chen Jin, losing 8-21, 21-18, 16-21, and did not advance to the quarter-finals.

== Achievements ==
=== Summer Universiade ===
Men's doubles
Year	Venue	Partner	Opponent	Score	Result
2007	Thammasat University; Pathum Thani, Thailand	(Chinese Taipei) Tsai Chia-hsin	(Thailand) Sudket Prapakamol (Thailand) Phattapol Ngensrisuk	21–17, 17–21, 14–21	Silver

=== BWF Grand Prix ===
The BWF Grand Prix has two levels: Grand Prix and Grand Prix Gold. It is a series of badminton tournaments sanctioned by the Badminton World Federation (BWF) since 2007.

Men's singles
Year	Tournament	Opponent	Score	Result
2008	Bulgaria Open	(Denmark) Joachim Persson	21–17, 19–21, 19–21	(silver) Runner-up

Mixed doubles
Year	Tournament	Partner	Opponent	Score	Result
2008	New Zealand Open	(Chinese Taipei) Chien Yu-chin	(Chinese Taipei) Chen Hung-ling (Chinese Taipei) Chou Chia-chi	18–21, 20–22	(silver) Runner-up

BWF Grand Prix Gold tournament
BWF Grand Prix tournament

=== BWF International Challenge/Series ===
Men's singles
Year	Tournament	Opponent	Score	Result
2008	Hellas International	(Denmark) Sune Gavnholt	21–10, 21–18	(gold) Winner
2005	OCBC International	(United States) Tony Gunawan	15–2, 15–2	(gold) Winner

Mixed doubles
Year	Tournament	Partner	Opponent	Score	Result
2009	Osaka International	(Chinese Taipei) Chien Yu-chin	(Japan) Noriyasu Hirata (Japan) Shizuka Matsuo	21–18, 21–15	(gold) Winner

BWF International Challenge tournament
BWF International Series tournament
