= Kaveh Mehrabi =

Iranian badminton player

Personal information
- Born: 5 May 1982 (age 44) Tehran, Iran
- Height: 1.73 m (5 ft 8 in)
- Weight: 65 kg (143 lb)

Sport
- Country: Iran
- Sport: Badminton
- Coached by: Michael Kjeldsen
- Highest ranking: 79
- BWF profile

Kaveh Mehrabi (Persian: کاوه مهرابی; born 5 May 1982) is an Iranian former badminton player.

== Career ==
Mehrabi was born in Tehran, Iran, and on 10 April 2003, he moved to Copenhagen, Denmark to become the first Iranian professional badminton player and practice at the International Badminton Academy.

Mehrabi participated at the 2008 Summer Olympics, and was defeated 2–0 in the first round. Mehrabi participated at six BWF World Championships.

In November 2011 Mehrabi refused to play against Israeli Maccabiah Games champion Misha Zilberman. Mehrabi was a member of the 'Champions for Peace' club, a group of 70 athletes committed to serving peace in the world through sport, created by Peace and Sport, a Monaco-based international organization.

Mehrabi was the Athletes' Commission Chairman (2008–2013) and a Council member of the Badminton World Federation (2010–2013). He graduated with physical education degree from the Azad University.

Mehrabi retired from his active sports career in 2012. Following his retirement, he worked with the Organising Committee for the inaugural European Games in Baku (2015), as well as with Peace and Sport and Special Olympics.

In December 2014, he joined the Sports Department of the International Olympic Committee (IOC), leading the unit responsible for athlete relations and engagement programmes.

With the establishment of the IOC Athletes' Department in 2021, as part of the Olympic Agenda 2020+5 implementation, he was appointed its Director.

== Achievements ==
=== BWF International Challenge/Series ===
Men's singles
Year	Tournament	Opponent	Score	Result
2005	South Africa International	(India) Nikhil Kanetkar	8–15, 7–15	(silver) Runner-up
2007	South Africa International	(Spain) Carlos Longo	19–21, 21–17, 21–15	(gold) Winner
2007	Algeria International	(Algeria) Nabil Lasmari	6–21, 4–10 retired	(silver) Runner-up
2008	Puerto Rico International	(Guatemala) Kevin Cordón	13–21, 9–21	(silver) Runner-up
2010	South Africa International	(Turkey) Murat Sen	21–9, 21–15	(gold) Winner
2011	Uganda International	(Czech Republic) Jan Fröhlich	15–21, 1–12 retired	(silver) Runner-up
2011	Fiji International	(Australia) Wesley Caulkett	21–13, 14–21, 16–21	(silver) Runner-up
2011	Namibia International	(Iran) Ali Shahhosseini	11–21, 17–21	(silver) Runner-up
2011	Zimbabwe International	(Iran) Ali Shahhosseini	21–13, 11–21, 13–21	(silver) Runner-up
2011	Syria International	(Portugal) Pedro Martins	15–21, 19–21	(silver) Runner-up

BWF International Series tournament
BWF Future Series tournament

== See also ==
- Boycotts of Israel in individual sports
