= Singapore at the 2008 Summer Olympics =

- IOC code: SIN
- NOC: Singapore National Olympic Council
- Website: www.singaporeolympics.com

in Beijing
- Competitors: 25 in 6 sports
- Flag bearer: Li Jiawei
- Medals Ranked 70th: Gold 0 Silver 1 Bronze 0 Total 1

Summer Olympics appearances (overview)
- 1948; 1952; 1956; 1960; 1964; 1968; 1972; 1976; 1980; 1984; 1988; 1992; 1996; 2000; 2004; 2008; 2012; 2016; 2020; 2024

Singapore competed in the 2008 Summer Olympics held in Beijing, People's Republic of China from 8 to 24 August 2008.

The following athletes have qualified for the 2008 Summer Olympics, although the final selection of names for some events may change are dependent on the relevant sports bodies, and all athletes require approval from the Singapore National Olympic Council.

On 17 August 2008, Singapore won its first Olympic medal as an independent nation in the women's table tennis team event, 48 years after its first medal (then as a British colony) – also a silver – by Tan Howe Liang in the 1960 Summer Olympics.

== Medalists ==
Medal	Name	Sport	Event
Silver	Feng Tianwei; Li Jiawei; Wang Yuegu	Table tennis	Women's team

== Athletics ==
Men

Athlete	Event	Heat		Quarter-final		Semi-final		Final	
Athlete	Event	Result	Rank	Result	Rank	Result	Rank	Result	Rank
Calvin Kang Li Loong	100 m	10.73	6	Did not advance					

Women

Athlete	Event	Qualification		Final	
Athlete	Event	Distance	Position	Distance	Position
Zhang Guirong	Shot put	16.23	29	Did not advance	

Key

- Note–Ranks given for track events are within the athlete's heat only
- Q = Qualified for the next round
- q = Qualified for the next round as a fastest loser or, in field events, by position without achieving the qualifying target
- NR = National record
- N/A = Round not applicable for the event
- Bye = Athlete not required to compete in round

== Badminton ==
Athlete	Event	Round of 64	Round of 32	Round of 16	Quarterfinal	Semi-final	Final / BM	
Athlete	Event	Opposition Score	Opposition Score	Opposition Score	Opposition Score	Opposition Score	Opposition Score	Rank
Ronald Susilo	Men's singles	Bye	Lee C W (MAS); L 13–21, 14–21	Did not advance				
Xing Aiying	Women's singles	Konon (BLR); L 19–21, 12–21	Did not advance					
Jiang Yanmei; Li Yujia	Women's doubles	—N/a		Lee / Mangkalakiri (USA); W 21–12, 21–12	Lee K-w / Lee H-j (KOR); L 15–21, 12–21	Did not advance		
Hendri Saputra; Li Yujia	Mixed doubles	—N/a		Laybourn / Juhl (DEN); L 12–21, 14–21	Did not advance			

== Sailing ==
Singapore had qualified the following boats for these Games.

Men

Athlete	Event	Race											Net points	Final rank
Athlete	Event	1	2	3	4	5	6	7	8	9	10	M*	Net points	Final rank
Koh Seng Leong	Laser	35	41	29	39	~~44~~; ~~BFD~~	33	23	3	36	CAN	EL	239	26
Terence Koh; Xu Yuan Zhen	470	15	17	18	19	~~30~~; ~~OCS~~	8	10	19	27	26	EL	159	22

Women

Athlete	Event	Race											Net points	Final rank
Athlete	Event	1	2	3	4	5	6	7	8	9	10	M*	Net points	Final rank
Lo Man Yi	Laser Radial	21	14	18	26	24	~~27~~	26	16	3	CAN	EL	128	25
Deborah Ong; Toh Liying	470	17	17	15	18	18	18	~~20~~; ~~OCS~~	16	19	18	EL	156	19

M = Medal race; EL = Eliminated – did not advance into the medal race; CAN = Race cancelled

== Shooting ==
Men

Athlete	Event	Qualification		Final	
Athlete	Event	Points	Rank	Points	Rank
Lee Wung Yew	Trap	110	28	Did not advance	

== Swimming ==
Men

Athlete	Event	Heat		Semi-final		Final	
Athlete	Event	Time	Rank	Time	Rank	Time	Rank
Tay Zhirong Bryan	200 m freestyle	1:50.41 NR	41	Did not advance			

Women

Athlete	Event	Heat		Semi-final		Final	
Athlete	Event	Time	Rank	Time	Rank	Time	Rank
Lynette Lim	200 m freestyle	2:02.30	28	Did not advance			
Lynette Lim	400 m freestyle	4:17.67	30	—N/a		Did not advance	
Lynette Lim	800 m freestyle	8:45.56	30	—N/a		Did not advance	
Quah Ting Wen	100 m freestyle	56.14	35	Did not advance			
Quah Ting Wen	400 m individual medley	4:51.25	25	—N/a		Did not advance	
Tao Li	100 m butterfly	57.77	4 Q	57.54	4 Q	57.99	5
Tao Li	200 m butterfly	2:12.63	26	Did not advance			
Nicolette Teo	100 m breaststroke	1:10.75	32	Did not advance			
Nicolette Teo	200 m breaststroke	2:34.60	35	Did not advance			

== Table tennis ==
Singles

Athlete	Event	Preliminary round	Round 1	Round 2	Round 3	Round 4	Quarterfinals	Semi-finals	Final / BM	
Athlete	Event	Opposition Result	Opposition Result	Opposition Result	Opposition Result	Opposition Result	Opposition Result	Opposition Result	Opposition Result	Rank
Gao Ning	Men's singles	Bye			Tan Rw (CRO); L 0–4	Did not advance				
Yang Zi	Men's singles	Bye		Freitas (POR); W 4–2	Chuang C-Y (TPE); W 4–3	Primorac (CRO); L 2–4	Did not advance			
Feng Tianwei	Women's singles	Bye			Dang Y-S (KOR); W 4–0	Li J (NED); W 4–2	Zhang Yn (CHN); L 1–4	Did not advance		
Li Jiawei	Women's singles	Bye			Boroš (CRO); W 4–1	Lin (HKG); W 4–3	Wang (USA); W 4–1	Zhang Yn (CHN); L 1–4	Guo Y (CHN); L 2–4	4
Wang Yuegu	Women's singles	Bye			Wu X (DOM); L 1–4	Did not advance				

Team

Athlete	Event	Group round		Semi-finals	Bronze playoff 1	Bronze playoff 2	Bronze medal	Final	
Athlete	Event	Opposition Result	Rank	Opposition Result	Opposition Result	Opposition Result	Opposition Result	Opposition Result	Rank
Cai Xiaoli; Gao Ning; Yang Zi	Men's team	Group B Germany; L 1 – 3 Croatia; L 1 – 3 Canada; W 3 – 0	3	Did not advance					
Feng Tianwei; Li Jiawei; Wang Yuegu	Women's team	Group B United States; W 3 – 0 Netherlands; W 3 – 0 Nigeria; W 3 – 0	1 Q	South Korea; W 3 – 2	Bye			China; L 0 – 3	2nd place, silver medalist(s)

== See also ==
- Singapore at the 2008 Summer Paralympics
