= Kim Nam-sun =

South Korean handball player (born 1981)

Olympic medal record

Women's handball

Representing South Korea
Bronze medal – third place	2008 Beijing	Team

- Kim Nam-sun
- Hangul: 김남선
- Hanja: 金南善
- RR: Gim Namseon
- MR: Kim Namsŏn

Kim Nam-sun (Korean: 김남선; born May 3, 1981) is a South Korean handball player who competed at the 2008 Summer Olympics.

In 2008, she won a bronze medal with the South Korean team.
