= Beijing University of Technology Gymnasium =

Sports venue in Beijing, China

Coordinates: 39°52′16″N 116°28′39″E

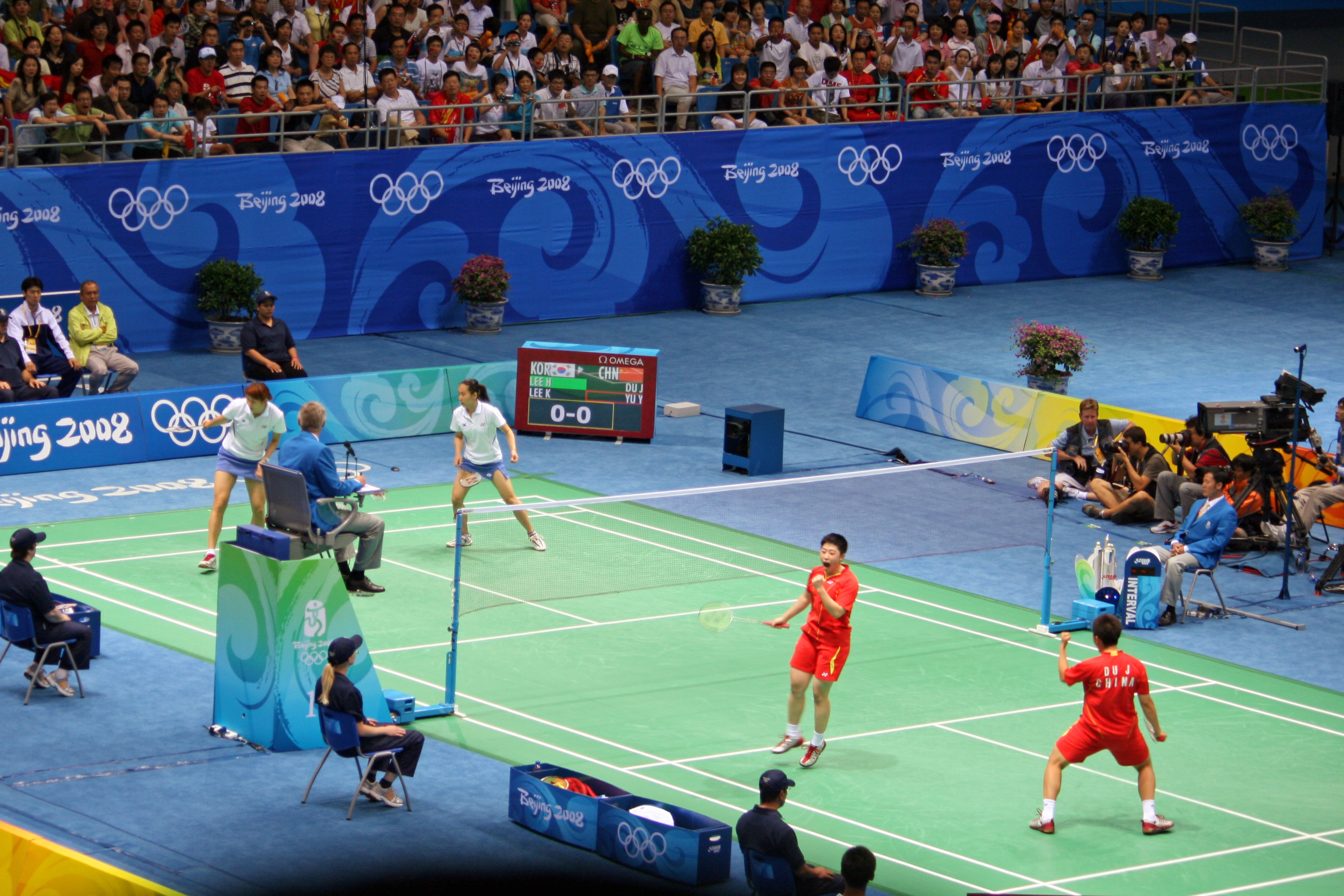
- Inside the venue during 2008 Summer Olympics
- Interactive map of Beijing University of Technology Gymnasium
- Location: Beijing University of Technology
- Owner: Beijing University of Technology
- Capacity: 7,500

Construction
- Opened: 2007
- Architect: South China University of Technology Institute of Architectural Design

Tenant
- Beijing University of Technology

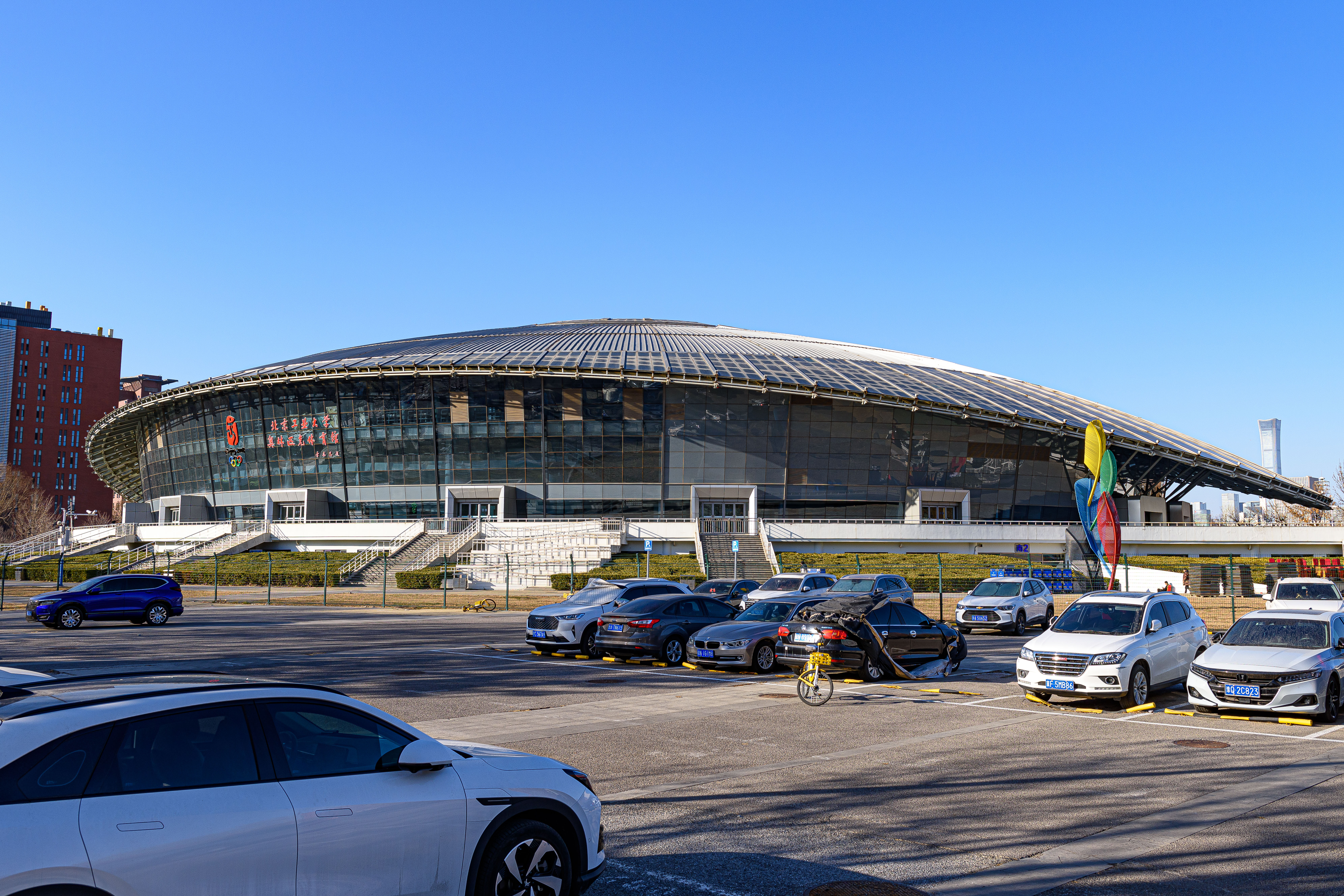
Exterior

The Beijing University of Technology Gymnasium (simplified Chinese: 北京工业大学体育馆; traditional Chinese: 北京工業大學體育館; pinyin: Běijīng Gōngyè Dàxué Tǐyùguǎn) is an indoor arena located on the campus of the Beijing University of Technology in the Chaoyang District in Beijing, China.

The gymnasium hosted the 2008 Summer Olympics badminton and rhythmic gymnastics events.

The gymnasium seating capacity is 7,500 and has a floor space of 2700 square metres.

After the Olympic Games, it has served as a training facility for Chinese badminton teams and also as a sports and recreational activities centre for students and local communities.

The gymnasium was completed in September 2007.
