= Rowing at the 2010 Asian Games =

- Venue: Guangzhou International Rowing Centre
- Dates: 14–19 October 2010
- Competitors: 201 from 19 nations

Rowing at the 2010 Asian Games was held in International Rowing Centre, Guangzhou, China from November 14 to 19, 2010. The host nation China dominated the competition winning all ten possible gold medals.

== Schedule ==
H	Heats	R	Repechages	F	Finals

Event↓/Date →	14th Sun	15th Mon	16th Tue	17th Wed	18th Thu	19th Fri
Men's single sculls		H		R		F
Men's double sculls	H				F	
Men's coxless four	H				F	
Men's eight		H				F
Men's lightweight single sculls		H		R		F
Men's lightweight double sculls	H		R		F	
Men's lightweight coxless four	H				F	
Women's single sculls		H				F
Women's double sculls	H				F	
Women's coxless pair		H				F
Women's coxless four	H				F	
Women's lightweight single sculls		H		R		F
Women's lightweight double sculls	H		R		F	
Women's lightweight quadruple sculls		H				F

== Medalists ==
=== Men ===
Event	Gold	Silver	Bronze
Single sculls	Bajrang Lal Takhar; India	Wang Ming-hui; Chinese Taipei	Haider Nawzad; Iraq
Double sculls	China; Su Hui; Zhang Liang	Uzbekistan; Vyacheslav Didrih; Ruslan Naurzaliev	South Korea; Kim Dong-yong; Kim Hwi-gwan
Coxless four	China; Liu Kun; Li Dongjian; Wu Lin; Sun Zhaowen	India; Saji Thomas; Jenil Krishnan; Anil Kumar; Ranjit Singh	Uzbekistan; Efim Kuznetsov; Botir Murodov; Yokub Khamzaev; Sergey Tyan
Eight	China; Zhu Ziqiang; Zhang Fangbing; Xue Feng; Zheng Xiaolong; Guo Xiaobing; Zhou Yinan; Qu Xiaoming; Wang Xiangdang; Zhang Dechang	India; Lokesh Kumar; Satish Joshi; Saji Thomas; Jenil Krishnan; Anil Kumar; Ranjit Singh; Rajesh Kumar Yadav; Manjeet Singh; Girraj Singh	Uzbekistan; Zafar Usmonov; Sergey Tyan; Aleksandr Didrih; Damir Naurzaliev; Efim Kuznetsov; Botir Murodov; Yokub Khamzaev; Abdurasul Muhammadiev; Artyom Kudryashov
Lightweight single sculls	Mohsen Shadi; Iran	Daisaku Takeda; Japan	Artyom Kudryashov; Uzbekistan
Lightweight double sculls	China; Zhang Guolin; Sun Jie	Hong Kong; So Sau Wah; Chow Kwong Wing	Japan; Kenta Tadachi; Kenta Kotani
Lightweight coxless four	Japan; Yoshinori Sato; Takahiro Suda; Yu Kataoka; Hideki Omoto	India; Lokesh Kumar; Satish Joshi; Rajesh Kumar Yadav; Manjeet Singh	Hong Kong; Leung Chun Shek; Liao Shun Yin; Tang Chiu Mang; Kwan Ki Cheong

=== Women ===
Event	Gold	Silver	Bronze
Single sculls	Tang Bin; China	Shin Yeong-eun; South Korea	Zarrina Mihaylova; Uzbekistan
Double sculls	China; Jin Ziwei; Tian Liang	Vietnam; Phạm Thị Huệ; Phạm Thị Thảo	South Korea; Ko Young-eun; Im Eun-ju
Coxless pair	China; Lin Hong; Sun Zhengping	Kazakhstan; Oxana Nazarova; Svetlana Germanovich	India; Pramila Prava Minz; Pratima Puhan
Coxless four	China; Ji Zhen; Li Xin; Liu Jiahuan; Ding Yanjie	South Korea; Lee Eun-hye; Kim Ka-yeong; Ra Hye-mi; Kim A-rum	Kazakhstan; Mariya Filimonova; Yekaterina Artemyeva; Svetlana Germanovich; Oxana Nazarova
Lightweight single sculls	Eri Wakai; Japan	Ji Yoo-jin; South Korea	Bussayamas Phaengkathok; Thailand
Lightweight double sculls	China; Huang Wenyi; Pan Feihong	Japan; Akiko Iwamoto; Atsumi Fukumoto	South Korea; Kim Myung-shin; Kim Sol-ji
Lightweight quadruple sculls	China; Yan Shimin; Wang Xinnan; Liu Jing; Liu Tingting	Vietnam; Trần Thị Sâm; Nguyễn Thị Hựu; Phạm Thị Hài; Đặng Thị Thắm	Iran; Nasim Benyaghoub; Maryam Saeidi; Soulmaz Abbasi; Homeira Barzegar

== Medal table ==
Rank	Nation	Gold	Silver	Bronze	Total
1	China (CHN)	10	0	0	10
2	Japan (JPN)	2	2	1	5
3	India (IND)	1	3	1	5
4	Iran (IRI)	1	0	1	2
5	South Korea (KOR)	0	3	3	6
6	Vietnam (VIE)	0	2	0	2
7	Uzbekistan (UZB)	0	1	4	5
8	Hong Kong (HKG)	0	1	1	2
8	Kazakhstan (KAZ)	0	1	1	2
10	Chinese Taipei (TPE)	0	1	0	1
11	Iraq (IRQ)	0	0	1	1
11	Thailand (THA)	0	0	1	1
Totals (12 entries)		14	14	14	42

== Participating nations ==
A total of 201 athletes from 19 nations competed in rowing at the 2010 Asian Games:

- Athletes from Kuwait (3)
- China (32)
- Chinese Taipei (5)
- Hong Kong (13)
- India (24)
- Indonesia (9)
- Iran (25)
- Iraq (5)
- Japan (10)
- Kazakhstan (11)
- North Korea (11)
- Philippines (3)
- Qatar (1)
- Singapore (1)
- South Korea (16)
- Sri Lanka (2)
- Thailand (10)
- Uzbekistan (14)
- Vietnam (6)
