= Rowing at the 2008 Summer Olympics – Men's lightweight double sculls =

Men's lightweight double sculls at the Games of the XXIX Olympiad

Medalists
1st place, gold medalist(s)		Zac Purchase; Mark Hunter	Great Britain
2nd place, silver medalist(s)		Dimitrios Mougios; Vasileios Polymeros	Greece
3rd place, bronze medalist(s)		Mads Rasmussen and Rasmus Quist Hansen	Denmark

Men's lightweight double sculls competition at the 2008 Summer Olympics in Beijing was held between August 10 and 17 at the Shunyi Olympic Rowing-Canoeing Park.

This rowing event is a double scull event, meaning that each boat is propelled by a pair of rowers. The "scull" portion means that the rower uses two oars, one on each side of the boat; this contrasts with sweep rowing in which each rower has one oar and rows on only one side. As a lightweight rowing competition, the body mass of the rowers was limited to a maximum of 72.5 kilograms each and 70 kilograms on average.

The competition consisted of multiple rounds. Finals were held to determine the placing of each boat; these finals were given letters with those nearer to the beginning of the alphabet meaning a better ranking. Semifinals were named based on which finals they fed, with each semifinal having two possible finals.

During the first round four heats were held. The top two boats in each heat advanced to the A/B semifinals, while all others were relegated to the repechage. In the repechage, two more heats were held. The top two boats in each of those heats also advanced to the A/B semifinals, while the remaining boats were sent to the C/D semifinals.

Four semifinals were held, two each of A/B semifinals and the C/D semifinals. For each semifinal race, the top three boats moved on to the better of the two finals, while the bottom three boats went to the lesser of the two finals possible. For example, a second-place finish in an A/B semifinal would result in advancement to the A final.

The third and final round was the Finals. Each final determined a set of rankings. The A final determined the medals, along with the rest of the places through 6th. The B final gave rankings from 7th to 12th, the C from 13th to 18th, and so on.

== Schedule ==
All times are China Standard Time (UTC+8)

Date	Time	Round
Sunday, August 10, 2008	15:20-16:00	Heats
Tuesday, August 12, 2008	16:20-16:40	Repechages
Friday, August 15, 2008	15:10-15:30	Semifinals C/D
Friday, August 15, 2008	15:50-16:10	Semifinals A/B
Saturday, August 16, 2008	14:00-14:10	Final D
Saturday, August 16, 2008	14:20-14:30	Final C
Saturday, August 16, 2008	14:40-14:50	Final B
Sunday, August 17, 2008	15:50-16:00	Final A

== Results ==
=== Heats ===
Qualification Rules: 1-2->SA/B, 3..->R

==== Heat 1 ====
Rank	Rowers	Country	Time	Notes
1	Zac Purchase, Mark Hunter	Great Britain	6:13.69	SA/B
2	Dimitrios Mougios, Vasileios Polymeros	Greece	6:16.10	SA/B
3	Jonathan Koch, Manuel Brehmer	Germany	6:21.99	R
4	Kazushige Ura, Daisaku Takeda	Japan	6:24.21	R
5	Mohamed Ryad Garidi, Kamel Ait Daoud	Algeria	6:43.94	R

==== Heat 2 ====
Rank	Rowers	Country	Time	Notes
1	Marcello Miani, Elia Luini	Italy	6:16.16	SA/B
2	Zhang Guolin, Sun Jie	China	6:17.62	SA/B
3	Samuel Beltz, Thomas Gibson	Australia	6:19.15	R
4	Eider Batista, Yunior Pérez	Cuba	6:19.36	R
5	Devender Kumar Khandwal, Manjeet Singh	India	6:37.13	R

==== Heat 3 ====
Rank	Rowers	Country	Time	Notes
1	Mads Rasmussen, Rasmus Quist Hansen	Denmark	6:14.84	SA/B
2	John Sasi, Cameron Sylvester	Canada	6:17.58	SA/B
3	Zsolt Hirling, Tamás Varga	Hungary	6:19.60	R
4	Rodolfo Collazo, Angel García	Uruguay	6:25.86	R
5	Thiago Gomes, Thiago Almeida	Brazil	6:30.78	R

==== Heat 4 ====
Rank	Rowers	Country	Time	Notes
1	Storm Uru, Peter Taylor	New Zealand	6:16.78	SA/B
2	Maxime Goisset, Frédéric Dufour	France	6:20.17	SA/B
3	Pedro Fraga, Nuno Mendes	Portugal	6:24.35	R
4	So Sau Wah, Chow Kwong Wing	Hong Kong	6:34.51	R
5	Jang Kang-eun, Kim Hong-kyun	South Korea	6:42.97	R

=== Repechages ===
Qualification Rules: 1-2->SA/B, 3..->SC/D

==== Repechage 1 ====
Rank	Rowers	Country	Time	Notes
1	Jonathan Koch, Manuel Brehmer	Germany	6:41.48	SA/B
2	Samuel Beltz, Thomas Gibson	Australia	6:42.42	SA/B
3	Rodolfo Collazo, Angel García	Uruguay	6:46.98	SC/D
4	Thiago Gomes, Thiago Almeida	Brazil	6:51.99	SC/D
5	So Sau Wah, Chow Kwong Wing	Hong Kong	6:58.71	SC/D
6	Mohamed Ryad Garidi, Kamel Ait Daoud	Algeria	7:05.73	SC/D

==== Repechage 2 ====
Rank	Rowers	Country	Time	Notes
1	Pedro Fraga, Nuno Mendes	Portugal	6:39.07	SA/B
2	Eyder Batista, Yunior Perez	Cuba	6:40.15	SA/B
3	Kazushige Ura, Daisaku Takeda	Japan	6:43.03	SC/D
4	Zsolt Hirling, Tamás Varga	Hungary	6:50.48	SC/D
5	Devender Kumar Khandwal, Manjeet Singh	India	7:02.06	SC/D
6	Jang Kang-Eun, Kim Hong-Kyun	South Korea	7:12.17	SC/D

=== Semifinals C/D ===
Qualification Rules: 1-3->FC, 4..->FD

==== Semifinal C/D 1 ====
Rank	Rowers	Country	Time	Notes
1	Zsolt Hirling, Tamás Varga	Hungary	6:28.84	FC
2	Rodolfo Collazo, Angel García	Uruguay	6:33.49	FC
3	So Sau Wah, Chow Kwong Wing	Hong Kong	6:33.79	FC
4	Jang Kang-Eun, Kim Hong-Kyun	South Korea	6:47.13	FD

==== Semifinal C/D 2 ====
Rank	Rowers	Country	Time	Notes
1	Kazushige Ura, Daisaku Takeda	Japan	6:29.30	FC
2	Thiago Gomes, Thiago Almeida	Brazil	6:39.91	FC
3	Devender Kumar Khandwal, Manjeet Singh	India	6:40.34	FC
4	Mohamed Ryad Garidi, Kamel Ait Daoud	Algeria	6:43.80	FD

=== Semifinals A/B ===
Qualification Rules: 1-3->FA, 4..->FB

==== Semifinal A/B 1 ====
Rank	Rowers	Country	Time	Notes
1	Zac Purchase, Mark Hunter	Great Britain	6:29.56	FA
2	Marcello Miani, Elia Luini	Italy	6:31.16	FA
3	Eyder Batista, Yunior Perez	Cuba	6:33.60	FA
4	Jonathan Koch, Manuel Brehmer	Germany	6:37.07	FB
5	Maxime Goisset, Frédéric Dufour	France	6:41.18	FB
6	Douglas Vandor, Cameron Sylvester	Canada	6:49.28	FB

==== Semifinal A/B 2 ====
Rank	Rowers	Country	Time	Notes
1	Dimitrios Mougios, Vasileios Polymeros	Greece	6:24.61	FA
2	Mads Rasmussen, Rasmus Quist Hansen	Denmark	6:26.49	FA
3	Zhang Guolin, Sun Jie	China	6:29.29	FA
4	Storm Uru, Peter Taylor	New Zealand	6:30.53	FB
5	Samuel Beltz, Thomas Gibson	Australia	6:32.32	FB
6	Pedro Fraga, Nuno Mendes	Portugal	6:39.23	FB

=== Finals ===
==== Final D ====
Rank	Rowers	Country	Time	Notes
1	Mohamed Ryad Garidi, Kamel Ait Daoud	Algeria	6:46.46	
2	Jang Kang-Eun, Kim Hong-Kyun	South Korea	6:47.44	

==== Final C ====
Rank	Rowers	Country	Time	Notes
1	Kazushige Ura, Daisaku Takeda	Japan	6:23.02	
2	Zsolt Hirling, Tamás Varga	Hungary	6:25.11	
3	Rodolfo Collazo, Angel García	Uruguay	6:30.61	
4	So Sau Wah, Chow Kwong Wing	Hong Kong	6:34.48	
5	Thiago Gomes, Thiago Almeida	Brazil	6:36.24	
6	Devender Kumar Khandwal, Manjeet Singh	India	6:44.48	

==== Final B ====
Rank	Rowers	Country	Time	Notes
1	Storm Uru, Peter Taylor	New Zealand	6:27.14	
2	Pedro Fraga, Nuno Mendes	Portugal	6:28.47	
3	Jonathan Koch, Manuel Brehmer	Germany	6:28.66	
4	Samuel Beltz, Thomas Gibson	Australia	6:30.11	
5	Maxime Goisset, Frédéric Dufour	France	6:32.65	
6	Douglas Vandor, Cameron Sylvester	Canada	6:40.80	

==== Final A ====
Rank	Rowers	Country	Time	Notes
Gold medal	Zac Purchase, Mark Hunter	Great Britain	6:10.99	
Silver medal	Dimitrios Mougios, Vasileios Polymeros	Greece	6:11.72	
Bronze medal	Mads Rasmussen, Rasmus Quist Hansen	Denmark	6:12.45	
4	Marcello Miani, Elia Luini	Italy	6:16.15	
5	Zhang Guolin, Sun Jie	China	6:16.69	
6	Eyder Batista, Yunior Perez	Cuba	6:19.96	
