= Rowing at the 2010 Asian Games – Men's lightweight double sculls =

Men's lightweight double sculls at the 2010 Asian Games
- Venue: Guangzhou International Rowing Centre
- Date: 14–18 November 2010
- Competitors: 24 from 12 nations

Medalists
gold medal	Zhang Guolin; Sun Jie	China
silver medal	So Sau Wah; Chow Kwong Wing	Hong Kong
bronze medal	Kenta Tadachi; Kenta Kotani	Japan

The men's lightweight double sculls competition at the 2010 Asian Games in Guangzhou, China was held from 14 November to 18 November at the International Rowing Centre.

== Schedule ==
All times are China Standard Time (UTC+08:00)

Date	Time	Event
Sunday, 14 November 2010	10:40	Heats
Tuesday, 16 November 2010	10:10	Repechages
Thursday, 18 November 2010	10:40	Finals

== Results ==
Legend

- DNS — Did not start

=== Heats ===
- Qualification: 1 → Final A (FA), 2–6 → Repechages (R)

==== Heat 1 ====
Rank	Team	Time	Notes
1	Hong Kong (HKG); So Sau Wah; Chow Kwong Wing	6:35.33	FA
2	India (IND); Shokender Tomar; Sandeep Kumar	6:40.00	R
3	Thailand (THA); Chaichana Thakum; Ruthtanaphol Theppibal	6:49.36	R
4	South Korea (KOR); Kim Hong-kyun; Kim Pyeong-seok	6:56.38	R
5	Sri Lanka (SRI); Gayan Jayaratne; Sajeev De Silva	7:06.32	R
—	Athletes from Kuwait (IOC); Fahad Al-Yaqout; Zamel Al-Zamel	DNS	

==== Heat 2 ====
Rank	Team	Time	Notes
1	China (CHN); Zhang Guolin; Sun Jie	6:27.81	FA
2	Japan (JPN); Kenta Tadachi; Kenta Kotani	6:39.74	R
3	Iran (IRI); Aghel Habibian; Hassan Jahanian	6:44.85	R
4	Philippines (PHI); Alvin Amposta; Roque Abala	6:54.76	R
5	Chinese Taipei (TPE); Chiu Shao-en; Yu Tsung-wei	6:55.36	R
6	Kazakhstan (KAZ); Vladislav Yakovlev; Artyom Issupov	6:55.76	R

=== Repechages ===
- Qualification: 1–2 → Final A (FA), 3–5 → Final B (FB)

==== Repechage 1 ====
Rank	Team	Time	Notes
1	India (IND); Shokender Tomar; Sandeep Kumar	6:35.55	FA
2	Iran (IRI); Aghel Habibian; Hassan Jahanian	6:37.80	FA
3	South Korea (KOR); Kim Hong-kyun; Kim Pyeong-seok	6:42.27	FB
4	Chinese Taipei (TPE); Chiu Shao-en; Yu Tsung-wei	6:49.20	FB

==== Repechage 2 ====
Rank	Team	Time	Notes
1	Japan (JPN); Kenta Tadachi; Kenta Kotani	6:40.17	FA
2	Thailand (THA); Chaichana Thakum; Ruthtanaphol Theppibal	6:41.35	FA
3	Kazakhstan (KAZ); Vladislav Yakovlev; Artyom Issupov	6:48.76	FB
4	Philippines (PHI); Alvin Amposta; Roque Abala	6:51.63	FB
5	Sri Lanka (SRI); Gayan Jayaratne; Sajeev De Silva	6:59.43	FB

=== Finals ===
==== Final B ====
Rank	Team	Time
1	South Korea (KOR); Kim Hong-kyun; Kim Pyeong-seok	6:47.02
2	Chinese Taipei (TPE); Chiu Shao-en; Yu Tsung-wei	6:47.70
3	Kazakhstan (KAZ); Vladislav Yakovlev; Artyom Issupov	6:47.92
4	Philippines (PHI); Alvin Amposta; Roque Abala	6:53.06
5	Sri Lanka (SRI); Gayan Jayaratne; Sajeev De Silva	7:02.40

==== Final A ====
Rank	Team	Time
1st place, gold medalist(s)	China (CHN); Zhang Guolin; Sun Jie	6:26.37
2nd place, silver medalist(s)	Hong Kong (HKG); So Sau Wah; Chow Kwong Wing	6:34.50
3rd place, bronze medalist(s)	Japan (JPN); Kenta Tadachi; Kenta Kotani	6:35.95
4	Thailand (THA); Chaichana Thakum; Ruthtanaphol Theppibal	6:36.29
5	India (IND); Shokender Tomar; Sandeep Kumar	6:42.23
6	Iran (IRI); Aghel Habibian; Hassan Jahanian	6:54.83
