= Rowing at the 2013 Mediterranean Games – Men's lightweight double sculls =

The men's lightweight double sculls rowing event at the 2013 Mediterranean Games will be held from June 21–23 at the Seyhan Dam in Adana.

== Schedule ==
All times are Eastern European Summer Time (UTC+3).

Date	Time	Round
June 21, 2013	09:20	Heats
June 22, 2013	09:10	Repechage
June 23, 2013	09:00	Final B
June 23, 2013	10:45	Final A

== Results ==
=== Heat 1 ===
Rank	Rowers	Country	Time	Notes
1	Elia Luini; Andrea Micheletti	Italy	6:30.86	FA
2	Aristotelis Ioannou; Omiros Antoniou	Cyprus	6:52.59	R
3	Enes Kusku; Bayram Sonmez	Turkey	7:00.23	R
4	Miloš Stanojević; Miloš Veres	Serbia	7:15.17	R

=== Heat 2 ===
Rank	Rowers	Country	Time	Notes
1	Elefterios Konsolas; Spyridon Giannaros	Greece	6:30.96	FA
2	Ander Zabala; Jaime De Haz	Spain	6:34.97	R
3	Omar Emira; Abdelmohsen Massoud	Egypt	6:43.88	R
4	Kamel Ait Daoud; Mohamed Ryad Garidi	Algeria	7:10.02	R

=== Repechage ===
Rank	Rowers	Country	Time	Notes
1	Enes Kusku; Bayram Sonmez	Turkey	6:28.91	FA
2	Ander Zabala; Jaime De Haz	Spain	6:29.90	FA
3	Miloš Stanojević; Miloš Veres	Serbia	6:32.00	FA
4	Omar Emira; Abdelmohsen Massoud	Egypt	6:34.01	FA
5	Aristotelis Ioannou; Omiros Antoniou	Cyprus	6:35.70	FB
6	Kamel Ait Daoud; Mohamed Ryad Garidi	Algeria	6:52.93	FB
