= Greece at the 2008 Summer Olympics =

- IOC code: GRE
- NOC: Hellenic Olympic Committee
- Website: www.hoc.gr (in Greek and English)

in Beijing China
- Competitors: 156 in 22 sports
- Flag bearers: Ilias Iliadis (opening); Hrysopiyi Devetzi (closing)
- Medals Ranked 58th: Gold 0 Silver 2 Bronze 1 Total 3

Summer Olympics appearances (overview)
- 1896; 1900; 1904; 1908; 1912; 1920; 1924; 1928; 1932; 1936; 1948; 1952; 1956; 1960; 1964; 1968; 1972; 1976; 1980; 1984; 1988; 1992; 1996; 2000; 2004; 2008; 2012; 2016; 2020; 2024; 2028

Other related appearances
- 1906 Intercalated Games

Greece, the previous host of the 2004 Olympics at Athens, competed at the 2008 Summer Olympics in Beijing, People's Republic of China. They were represented by the Hellenic Olympic Committee, which announced on July 28, 2008, the 156 Greek athletes to compete in Beijing, composed of 84 men and 72 women, the largest Greek Olympic team ever excluding the home team of the Athens 2004 Olympics. Greece took part in archery, athletics, basketball, boxing, canoeing, cycling, diving, gymnastics, judo, rowing, sailing, shooting, swimming, synchronized swimming, table tennis, taekwondo, tennis, triathlon, beach volleyball, water polo, weightlifting and wrestling.

As the progenitor nation of the Olympic Games, and in keeping with tradition, Greece entered the Beijing National Stadium first during the opening ceremony, led by the judoka Ilias Iliadis, who won a gold medal at the 2004 Summer Olympics in Athens.

The Greek team was originally awarded two silver and two bronze medals. In all four medal cases there was participation by athletes who were also medalists at the 2004 Summer Olympics in Athens (in the case of groups, at least one of their members was a former medalist).

Alexandros Nikolaidis won a second Olympic silver medal, Vasileios Polymeros was second after his third place in Athens (along with Dimitrios Mougios), while the golden medalist of 2004 Sofia Bekatorou led the yngling class team to the third place. Hrysopiyi Devetzi was third, but eight years later (2016) she was disqualified by IAAF and the IOC and had her Olympic bronze medal annulled due to stanozol use.

== Medalists ==
Medal	Name	Sport	Event
Silver	Dimitrios Mougios; Vasileios Polymeros	Rowing	Men's lightweight double sculls
Silver	Alexandros Nikolaidis	Taekwondo	Men's +80 kg
Bronze	Sofia Bekatorou; Virginia Kravarioti; Sofia Papadopoulou	Sailing	Women's yngling class

== Archery ==
Greece will send archers to the Olympics for the third time, seeking the nation's first Olympic medal in the sport. Elpida Romantzi earned the country its first qualifying spot, in the women's competition, by placing 36th in the 2007 World Outdoor Target Championships. Evangelia Psarra placed third at the European qualifying tournament, giving Greece a second spot in the women's individual competition.

Athlete	Event	Ranking round		Round of 64	Round of 32	Round of 16	Quarterfinals	Semifinals	Final / BM	
Athlete	Event	Score	Seed	Opposition Score	Opposition Score	Opposition Score	Opposition Score	Opposition Score	Opposition Score	Rank
Evangelia Psarra	Women's individual	613	50	Chen L (CHN) (15); L 101–110	Did not advance					
Elpida Romantzi	Women's individual	614	49	Şatır (TUR) (16); W 105–103	Esebua (GEO) (17); W 102 (10)–102 (9)	Park (KOR) (1); L 103–115	Did not advance			

== Athletics ==
Key

- Note–Ranks given for track events are within the athlete's heat only
- Q = Qualified for the next round
- q = Qualified for the next round as a fastest loser or, in field events, by position without achieving the qualifying target
- NR = National record
- N/A = Round not applicable for the event
- Bye = Athlete not required to compete in round

Men
Track & road events

Athlete	Event	Heat		Quarterfinal		Semifinal		Final	
Athlete	Event	Result	Rank	Result	Rank	Result	Rank	Result	Rank
Konstadinos Douvalidis	110 m hurdles	13.49	1 Q	13.46	4 q	13.55	5	Did not advance	
Periklis Iakovakis	400 m hurdles	49.50	2 Q	—N/a		48.69	4 Q	49.96	8
Konstadinos Stefanopoulos	50 km walk	—N/a						4:07:53	37
Konstadinos Anastasiou; Stylianos Dimotsios; Dimitrios Gravalos; Pantelis Melachroinoudis	4 × 400 m relay	3:04.30	7	—N/a				Did not advance	

Field events

Athlete	Event	Qualification		Final	
Athlete	Event	Distance	Position	Distance	Position
Konstadinos Baniotis	High jump	2.10	37	Did not advance	
Alexandros Papadimitriou	Hammer throw	74.33	18	Did not advance	
Ioannis-Georgios Smalios	Javelin throw	71.87	27	Did not advance	
Mihail Stamatoyiannis	Shot put	18.45	36	Did not advance	
Louis Tsatoumas	Long jump	8.27	1 Q	NM	—
Dimitrios Tsiamis	Triple jump	16.65	23	Did not advance	

Women
Track & road events

Athlete	Event	Heat		Semifinal		Final	
Athlete	Event	Result	Rank	Result	Rank	Result	Rank
Eleni Donta	Marathon	—N/a				2:46:44	60
Dimitra Dova	400 m	52.69	5	Did not advance			
Konstadina Efedaki	1500 m	4:15:02	10	—N/a		Did not advance	
Irini Kokkinariou	3000 m steeplechase	10:22.39	15	—N/a		Did not advance	
Flora Redoumi	100 m hurdles	13.56	7	Did not advance			
Athanasia Tsoumeleka	20 km walk	—N/a				~~1:27:54~~	DSQ
Evaggelia Xinou	20 km walk	—N/a				1:32:19	25
Despina Zapounidou	20 km walk	—N/a				1:39:11	41

Field events

Athlete	Event	Qualification		Final	
Athlete	Event	Distance	Position	Distance	Position
Hrysopiyi Devetzi	Long jump	6.57	14	Did not advance	
Hrysopiyi Devetzi	Triple jump	~~14.92~~	2 Q	~~15.23~~	DSQ
Dorothea Kalpakidou	Discus throw	53.00	35	Did not advance	
Nikoleta Kyriakopoulou	Pole vault	4.15	27	Did not advance	
Savva Lika	Javelin throw	59.11	15	Did not advance	
Stiliani Papadopoulou	Hammer throw	69.36	12 q	64.97	11
Alexandra Papageorgiou	Hammer throw	66.72	28	Did not advance	
Athanasia Perra	Triple jump	NM	—	Did not advance	
Afroditi Skafida	Pole vault	4.30	16	Did not advance	
Antonia Stergiou	High jump	1.85	24	Did not advance	
Irini Terzoglou	Shot put	16.50	26	Did not advance	

Combined events – Heptathlon

Athlete	Event	100H	HJ	SP	200 m	LJ	JT	800 m	Final	Rank
Argyro Strataki	Result	14.05	1.68	13.22	25.47	5.97	45.20	2:14.57	5893	24
Argyro Strataki	Points	971	830	742	844	840	767	899	5893	24

== Basketball ==
Greece qualified for the men's basketball tournament through the FIBA World Olympic Qualifying Tournament for Men 2008.

=== Men's tournament ===
Roster

The following is the Greece roster in the men's basketball tournament of the 2008 Summer Olympics.

Greece men's national basketball team – 2008 Summer Olympics roster
Players
Coaches

Pos.	No.	Name	Age – Date of birth	Height	Club	Ctr.
PG	4	Theo Papaloukas (C)	31 – May 8, 1977	6 ft 7 in (2.01 m)	Olympiacos B.C.	(Greece)
F/C	5	Ioannis Bourousis	24 – November 17, 1983	7 ft 1 in (2.16 m)	Olympiacos B.C.	(Greece)
PG	6	Nikos Zisis	24 – August 16, 1983	6 ft 6 in (1.98 m)	PBC CSKA Moscow	(Russia)
PG	7	Vassilis Spanoulis	26 – August 7, 1982	6 ft 4 in (1.93 m)	Panathinaikos BC	(Greece)
F	8	Panagiotis Vasilopoulos	24 – February 8, 1984	6 ft 8 in (2.03 m)	Olympiacos B.C.	(Greece)
PF	9	Antonis Fotsis	27 – April 1, 1981	6 ft 10 in (2.08 m)	Panathinaikos BC	(Greece)
F	10	Giorgos Printezis	23 – February 22, 1985	6 ft 9 in (2.06 m)	Olympiacos B.C.	(Greece)
C	11	Andreas Glyniadakis	26 – August 26, 1981	7 ft 1 in (2.16 m)	Maroussi BC	(Greece)
F/C	12	Kostas Tsartsaris	28 – October 17, 1979	6 ft 11 in (2.11 m)	Panathinaikos BC	(Greece)
G	13	Dimitris Diamantidis	28 – May 6, 1980	6 ft 5 in (1.96 m)	Panathinaikos BC	(Greece)
C	14	Sofoklis Schortsanitis	23 – June 22, 1985	6 ft 10 in (2.08 m)	Olympiacos B.C.	(Greece)
G/F	15	Michalis Pelekanos	27 – May 25, 1981	6 ft 6 in (1.98 m)	Olympiacos B.C.	(Greece)

Head coach

- (Greece) Panagiotis Giannakis

Legend

- (C) Team captain
- Club – describes last
  club before the tournament
- Age – describes age
  on August 9, 2008

Group play

Pos	Team	Pld	W	L	PF	PA	PD	Pts	Qualification
1	United States	5	5	0	515	354	+161	10	Quarterfinals
2	Spain	5	4	1	418	369	+49	9	Quarterfinals
3	Greece	5	3	2	415	375	+40	8	Quarterfinals
4	China (H)	5	2	3	366	400	−34	7	Quarterfinals
5	Germany	5	1	4	330	390	−60	6	
6	Angola	5	0	5	321	477	−156	5	

Source: FIBA archive
Rules for classification: 1) points; 2) head-to-head points; 3) head-to-head goal average; 4) head-to-head number of points scored.
(H) Hosts

10 August 2008
14:30

Report

Spain	81–66	Greece
Scoring by quarter: 20–16, 15–13, 27–17, 19–20
Pts: Fernández 16; Rebs: P. Gasol 7 Asts: Navarro, Rodríguez 2		Pts: Spanoulis 15; Rebs: Tsartsaris 8 Asts: Diamantidis 3

Wukesong Indoor Stadium, Beijing
Attendance: 11,083
Referees: Reynaldo Mercedes (DOM)

12 August 2008
14:30

Report

Greece	87–64	Germany
Scoring by quarter: 21–23, 23–10, 25–15, 18–16
Pts: Spanoulis 23; Rebs: Bourousis 8 Asts: Spanoulis 5		Pts: Nowitzki 13; Rebs: Nowitzki 6 Asts: Greene 2

Wukesong Indoor Stadium, Beijing
Attendance: 11,083
Referees: Carl Jungebrand (FIN)

14 August 2008
20:00

Report

United States	92–69	Greece
Scoring by quarter: 20–16, 31–16, 23–22, 18–15
Pts: Bryant, Bosh 18; Rebs: James, Howard, Anthony 6 Asts: James 6		Pts: Papaloukas 15; Rebs: Fotsis, Papaloukas 8 Asts: Diamantidis 3

Wukesong Indoor Stadium, Beijing
Attendance: 11,083
Referees: Romualdas Brazauskas (LTU)

16 August 2008
09:00

Report

Greece	102–61	Angola
Scoring by quarter: 12–11, 31–17, 38–14, 21–19
Pts: Bourousis 22; Rebs: Glyniadakis, Fotsis 7 Asts: Fotsis 5		Pts: Mingas 25; Rebs: Geronimo 7 Asts: Costa 4

Wukesong Indoor Stadium, Beijing
Attendance: 11,083
Referees: José Carrión (PUR)

18 August 2008
14:30

Report

Greece	91–77	China
Scoring by quarter: 27–15, 19–9, 23–30, 22–23
Pts: Bourousis, Spanoulis 19; Rebs: Bourousis 19; Asts: Papaloukas, Spanoulis 5		Pts: Yao 16; Rebs: Wang 8 Asts: Sun 6

Wukesong Indoor Stadium, Beijing
Attendance: 11,083
Referees: Cristiano Maranho (BRA)

Quarterfinals

20 August 2008
22:15

Report

Argentina	80–78	Greece
Scoring by quarter: 22–23, 17–17, 17–15, 24–23
Scoring by half: 39–40, 41–38
Pts: Ginobili 24; Rebs: Scola 8 Asts: Prigioni 3		Pts: Fotsis 17; Rebs: Fotsis 10; Asts: Papaloukas 4

Wukesong Indoor Stadium, Beijing
Attendance: 11,083
Referees: Romualdas Brazauskas (LTU)

== Boxing ==
Greece qualified two boxers for the Olympic boxing tournament. Both qualified at the second European continental qualifying tournament.

Athlete	Event	Round of 32	Round of 16	Quarterfinals	Semifinals	Final	
Athlete	Event	Opposition Result	Opposition Result	Opposition Result	Opposition Result	Opposition Result	Rank
Georgios Gazis	Middleweight	Biembe (COD); W 7–2	Góngora (ECU); L 1–12	Did not advance			
Elias Pavlidis	Heavyweight	Bye	Gajović (MNE); W 7–3	Acosta (CUB); L 4–7	Did not advance		

== Canoeing ==
=== Slalom ===
Athlete	Event	Preliminary						Semifinal		Final			
Athlete	Event	Run 1	Rank	Run 2	Rank	Total	Rank	Time	Rank	Time	Rank	Total	Rank
Christos Tsakmakis	Men's C-1	91.53	10	86.01	5	177.54	8 Q	92.18	6 Q	94.49	7	186.67	7
Maria Ferekidi	Women's K-1	108.37	13	113.60	19	221.97	12 Q	118.99	11	Did not advance			

=== Sprint ===
Athlete	Event	Heats		Semifinals		Final	
Athlete	Event	Time	Rank	Time	Rank	Time	Rank
Andreas Kiligkaridis	Men's C-1 500 m	1:54.541	5 QS	1:56.310	5	Did not advance	
Andreas Kiligkaridis	Men's C-1 1000 m	4:18.488	5 QS	4:04.627	5	Did not advance	

Qualification Legend: QS = Qualify to semi-final; QF = Qualify directly to final

== Cycling ==
=== Track ===
Greece will have entries in the men's Keirin and team sprint.

Sprint

Athlete	Event	Qualification		Round 1	Round 2	Quarterfinals	Semifinals	Final	
Athlete	Event	Time Speed (km/h)	Rank	Opposition Time Speed (km/h)	Opposition Time Speed (km/h)	Opposition Time Speed (km/h)	Opposition Time Speed (km/h)	Opposition Time Speed (km/h)	Rank
Vasileios Reppas	Men's sprint	10.966; 65.657	20	Did not advance					
Athanasios Mantzouranis; Vasileios Reppas; Panagiotis Voukelatos	Men's team sprint	45.645; 59.152	10	Did not advance					

Keirin

Athlete	Event	1st round	Repechage	2nd round	Finals
Athlete	Event	Rank	Rank	Rank	Rank
Athanasios Mantzouranis	Men's keirin	5 R	3	Did not advance	
Christos Volikakis	Men's keirin	5 R	2	Did not advance	

== Diving ==
Athlete	Event	Preliminaries		Semifinals		Final	
Athlete	Event	Points	Rank	Points	Rank	Points	Rank
Eftychia Papavasilopoulou	10 m platform	252.00	26	Did not advance			

== Gymnastics ==
=== Artistic ===
Men

Athlete	Event	Qualification								Final							
Athlete	Event	Apparatus						Total	Rank	Apparatus						Total	Rank
Athlete	Event	F	PH	R	V	PB	HB	Total	Rank	F	PH	R	V	PB	HB	Total	Rank
Vlasios Maras	Vault	—N/a			15.987	—N/a		15.987	11	Did not advance							
Vlasios Maras	Horizontal bar	—N/a					13.975	13.975	60	Did not advance							

Women

Athlete	Event	Qualification						Final					
Athlete	Event	Apparatus				Total	Rank	Apparatus				Total	Rank
Athlete	Event	F	V	UB	BB	Total	Rank	F	V	UB	BB	Total	Rank
Stefani Bismpikou	All-around	13.575	14.225	14.350	14.475	56.625	39	Did not advance					

=== Rhythmic ===
Athlete	Event	Qualification						Final					
Athlete	Event	Hoop	Rope	Clubs	Ribbon	Total	Rank	Hoop	Rope	Clubs	Ribbon	Total	Rank
Eleni Andriola	Individual	14.750	15.450	14.100	15.400	59.700	21	Did not advance					

Athlete	Event	Qualification				Final			
Athlete	Event	5 ropes	3 hoops 2 clubs	Total	Rank	5 ropes	3 hoops 2 clubs	Total	Rank
Dimitra Kafalidou; Vasiliki Maniou; Olga-Afroditi Pilaki; Paraskevi Pleksida; Ioanna Samara; Nikoletta Tsagari	Team	15.400	15.600	31.000	9	Did not advance			

== Judo ==
Athlete	Event	Preliminary	Round of 32	Round of 16	Quarterfinals	Semifinals	Repechage 1	Repechage 2	Repechage 3	Final / BM	
Athlete	Event	Opposition Result	Opposition Result	Opposition Result	Opposition Result	Opposition Result	Opposition Result	Opposition Result	Opposition Result	Opposition Result	Rank
Lavrentios Alexanidis	Men's −60 kg	Bye	D'Aquino (AUS); W 1000–0000	Houkes (NED); L 0000–0001	Did not advance		Will (CAN); L 0010–1001	Did not advance			
Tariel Zintiridis	Men's −66 kg	Bye	Takata (USA); L 0000–0010	Did not advance							
Ilias Iliadis	Men's −90 kg	Bye	Huizinga (NED); L 0001–1010	Did not advance							

== Rowing ==
Men

Athlete	Event	Heats		Repechage		Quarterfinals		Semifinals		Final	
Athlete	Event	Time	Rank	Time	Rank	Time	Rank	Time	Rank	Time	Rank
Ioannis Christou	Single sculls	7:29.87	3 QF	—N/a		6:58.28	3 SA/B	7:06.02	4 FB	7:06.02	10
Dimitrios Mougios; Vasileios Polymeros	Lightweight double sculls	6:16.10	2 SA/B	Bye		—N/a		6:24.61	1 FA	6:11.72	2nd place, silver medalist(s)

Women

Athlete	Event	Heats		Repechage		Semifinals		Final	
Athlete	Event	Time	Rank	Time	Rank	Time	Rank	Time	Rank
Chrysi Biskitzi; Alexandra Tsiavou	Lightweight double sculls	7:05.95	5 R	7:24.55	2 SA/B	7:11.99	3 FA	7:04.61	6

Qualification Legend: FA=Final A (medal); FB=Final B (non-medal); FC=Final C (non-medal); FD=Final D (non-medal); FE=Final E (non-medal); FF=Final F (non-medal); SA/B=Semifinals A/B; SC/D=Semifinals C/D; SE/F=Semifinals E/F; QF=Quarterfinals; R=Repechage

== Sailing ==
Men

Athlete	Event	Race											Net points	Final rank
Athlete	Event	1	2	3	4	5	6	7	8	9	10	M*	Net points	Final rank
Nikolaos Kaklamanakis	RS:X	10	2	12	11	8	10	5	~~15~~	10	7	OCS	97	8
Evangelos Cheimonas	Laser	22	21	9	11	~~DSQ~~	BFD	9	6	8	CAN	EL	130	15
Andreas Kosmatopoulos; Andreas Papadopoulos	470	5	26	11	8	5	5	18	3	20	~~29~~	EL	101	12

Women

Athlete	Event	Race											Net points	Final rank
Athlete	Event	1	2	3	4	5	6	7	8	9	10	M*	Net points	Final rank
Athina Frai	RS:X	15	15	16	10	~~19~~	5	11	9	15	11	EL	107	14
Efi Mantzaraki	Laser Radial	14	18	14	18	16	8	5	22	~~24~~	CAN	EL	115	18
Sofia Bekatorou; Virginia Kravarioti; Sofia Papadopoulou	Yngling	10	12	9	3	2	~~OCS~~	3	3	CAN	CAN	6	48	3rd place, bronze medalist(s)

Open

Athlete	Event	Race											Net points	Final rank
Athlete	Event	1	2	3	4	5	6	7	8	9	10	M*	Net points	Final rank
Aimilios Papathanasiou	Finn	1	~~DNF~~	5	DNF	18	15	DNF	8	CAN	CAN	EL	101	15
Iordanis Paschalidis; Konstantinos Trigonis	Tornado	2	5	12	7	2	12	4	10	6	~~13~~	DNF	82	9

M = Medal race; EL = Eliminated – did not advance into the medal race;

== Shooting ==
Men

Athlete	Event	Qualification		Final	
Athlete	Event	Points	Rank	Points	Rank
Georgios Salavantakis	Skeet	109	33	Did not advance	

== Swimming ==
Men

Athlete	Event	Heat		Semifinal		Final	
Athlete	Event	Time	Rank	Time	Rank	Time	Rank
Romanos Alyfantis	100 m breaststroke	1:03.39	50	Did not advance			
Romanos Alyfantis	200 m breaststroke	2:16.04	41	Did not advance			
Romanos Alyfantis	200 m butterfly	1:57.99	26	Did not advance			
Romanos Alyfantis	400 m individual medley	4:23.41	25	—N/a		Did not advance	
Dimitrios Chasiotis	200 m backstroke	2:02.30	36	Did not advance			
Vasileios Demetis	400 m individual medley	4:18.40	18	—N/a		Did not advance	
Spyridon Gianniotis	400 m freestyle	3:49.34	24	—N/a		Did not advance	
Spyridon Gianniotis	1500 m freestyle	14:53.32	12	—N/a		Did not advance	
Spyridon Gianniotis	10 km open water	—N/a				1:52:20.4	16
Aristeidis Grigoriadis	100 m freestyle	50.62	48	Did not advance			
Aristeidis Grigoriadis	100 m backstroke	54.71	17	Did not advance			
Ioannis Kokkodis	200 m individual medley	2:01.22	23	Did not advance			
Sotirios Pastras	100 m butterfly	52.41 NR	25	Did not advance			
Apostolos Tsagkarakis	50 m freestyle	22.39	26	Did not advance			
Andreas Zisimos	200 m freestyle	1:48.82	29	Did not advance			
Vasileios Demetis; Ioannis Giannoulis; Nikolaos Xylouris; Andreas Zisimos	4 × 200 m freestyle relay	7:18.26	15	—N/a		Did not advance	

Women

Athlete	Event	Heat		Semifinal		Final	
Athlete	Event	Time	Rank	Time	Rank	Time	Rank
Stella Boumi	200 m backstroke	2:14.73	29	Did not advance			
Eleftheria Evgenia Efstathiou	400 m freestyle	4:15.78	27	—N/a		Did not advance	
Eleftheria Evgenia Efstathiou	800 m freestyle	8:41.65	28	—N/a		Did not advance	
Eleftheria Evgenia Efstathiou	200 m butterfly	2:13.27	29	Did not advance			
Angeliki Exarchou	100 m breaststroke	1:10.47	30	Did not advance			
Angeliki Exarchou	200 m breaststroke	2:36.83	39	Did not advance			
Eirini Kavarnou	100 m butterfly	1:00.74	41	Did not advance			
Eleni Kosti	100 m freestyle	56.44	37	Did not advance			
Eleni Kosti	200 m freestyle	2:04.55	44	Did not advance			
Marianna Lymperta	10 km open water	—N/a				1:59:42.3	11
Martha Matsa	50 m freestyle	25.68	33	Did not advance			

== Synchronized swimming ==
Athlete	Event	Technical routine		Free routine (preliminary)			Free routine (final)		
Athlete	Event	Points	Rank	Points	Total (technical + free)	Rank	Points	Total (technical + free)	Rank
Evanthia Makrygianni; Despoina Solomou	Duet	45.834	9	45.584	91.418	10	45.667	91.501	10

== Table tennis ==
Singles

Athlete	Event	Preliminary round	Round 1	Round 2	Round 3	Round 4	Quarterfinals	Semifinals	Final / BM	
Athlete	Event	Opposition Result	Opposition Result	Opposition Result	Opposition Result	Opposition Result	Opposition Result	Opposition Result	Opposition Result	Rank
Panagiotis Gionis	Men's singles	Bye	Tsuboi (BRA); W 4–0	Lin C K (HKG); L 3–4	Did not advance					
Kalinikos Kreanga	Men's singles	Bye		Mizutani (JPN); W 4–1	Ma L (CHN); L 0–4	Did not advance				

Team

Athlete	Event	Group round		Semifinals	Bronze playoff 1	Bronze playoff 2	Bronze medal	Final	
Athlete	Event	Opposition Result	Rank	Opposition Result	Opposition Result	Opposition Result	Opposition Result	Opposition Result	Rank
Panagiotis Gionis; Kalinikos Kreanga; Ntaniel Tsiokas	Men's team	Group A China; L 0 – 3 Austria; L 0 – 3 Australia; W 3 – 0	3	Did not advance					

== Taekwondo ==
Athlete	Event	Round of 16	Quarterfinals	Semifinals	Repechage	Bronze medal	Final	
Athlete	Event	Opposition Result	Opposition Result	Opposition Result	Opposition Result	Opposition Result	Opposition Result	Rank
Alexandros Nikolaidis	Men's +80 kg	Chilmanov (KAZ); W 4–3	Zrouri (MAR); W 5–4	Chukwumerije (NGR); W 3–2	Bye		Cha D-M (KOR); L 4–5	2nd place, silver medalist(s)
Elisavet Mystakidou	Women's −67 kg	Ocasio (PUR); L 0–1	Did not advance					
Kyriaki Kouvari	Women's +67 kg	Falavigna (BRA); L 1–3	Did not advance					

== Tennis ==
Athlete	Event	Round of 64	Round of 32	Round of 16	Quarterfinals	Semifinals	Final	
Athlete	Event	Opposition Score	Opposition Score	Opposition Score	Opposition Score	Opposition Score	Opposition Score	Rank
Eleni Daniilidou	Women's singles	Razzano (FRA); L 3–6, 3–6	Did not advance					
Eleni Daniilidou; Anna Gerasimou	Women's doubles	—N/a	Gagliardi / Schnyder (SUI); L 0–6, 4–6	Did not advance				

== Triathlon ==
Athlete	Event	Swim (1.5 km)	Trans 1	Bike (40 km)	Trans 2	Run (10 km)	Total Time	Rank
Deniz Dimaki	Women's	21:36	Lapped					

== Volleyball ==
=== Beach ===
Greece has two teams in the women's Olympic beach volleyball tournament.

Athlete	Event	Preliminary round	Standing	Round of 16	Quarterfinals	Semifinals	Final / BM	
Athlete	Event	Opposition Score	Standing	Opposition Score	Opposition Score	Opposition Score	Opposition Score	Rank
Vassiliki Arvaniti; Vasso Karantasiou	Women's	Pool F D Schwaiger – S Schwaiger (AUT); L 0 – 2 (18–21, 18–21); Candelas – García (MEX); L 1 – 2 (17–21, 21–16, 12–15); Talita – Renata (BRA); L 0 – 2 (20–22, 19–21)	4	Did not advance				
Efthalia Koutroumanidou; Maria Tsiartsiani	Women's	Pool D Chen X – Zhang X (CHN); L 1 – 2 (18–21, 21–19, 12–15); Augoustides – Nel (RSA); W 2 – 0 (21–12, 21–8); Goller – Ludwig (GER); L 0 – 2 (22–24, 12–21)	3 Q	Barnett – Cook (AUS); L 1 – 2 (20–22, 21–19, 12–15)	Did not advance			

== Water polo ==
Greece participated in both the men's and the women's tournaments. The men's team finished in 7th place, while the women's team finished in 8th place.

=== Men's tournament ===
Roster

The following is the Greek roster in the men's water polo tournament of the 2008 Summer Olympics.

№	Name	Pos.	Height	Weight	Date of birth	Club
1	Nikolaos Deligiannis	GK	1.90 m (6 ft 3 in)	96 kg (212 lb)	3 September 1976	(Greece) Olympiacos
2	Anastasios Schizas	CB	1.91 m (6 ft 3 in)	91 kg (201 lb)	18 February 1977	(Greece) Olympiacos
3	Dimitrios Mazis	D	1.84 m (6 ft 0 in)	85 kg (187 lb)	5 September 1976	(Greece) Ethnikos Piraeus
4	Konstantinos Kokkinakis	CB	1.93 m (6 ft 4 in)	105 kg (231 lb)	9 October 1975	(Greece) Ethnikos Piraeus
5	Ioannis Thomakos	D	1.85 m (6 ft 1 in)	88 kg (194 lb)	14 March 1977	(Greece) Panionios
6	Argyris Theodoropoulos	D	1.85 m (6 ft 1 in)	90 kg (200 lb)	13 January 1981	(Greece) Olympiacos
7	Christos Afroudakis	D	1.88 m (6 ft 2 in)	88 kg (194 lb)	23 May 1984	(Greece) Olympiacos
8	Georgios Ntoskas	D	1.86 m (6 ft 1 in)	99 kg (218 lb)	11 November 1984	(Greece) Olympiacos
9	Georgios Afroudakis	CF	1.94 m (6 ft 4 in)	105 kg (231 lb)	17 October 1976	(Greece) Olympiacos
10	Dimitrios Miteloudis	CB	1.86 m (6 ft 1 in)	87 kg (192 lb)	11 February 1982	(Greece) Vouliagmeni
11	Antonios Vlontakis	CF	1.88 m (6 ft 2 in)	96 kg (212 lb)	10 October 1975	(Greece) Ethnikos Piraeus
12	Emmanouil Mylonakis	D	1.85 m (6 ft 1 in)	74 kg (163 lb)	9 April 1985	(Greece) Ethnikos Piraeus
13	Georgios Reppas	GK	1.89 m (6 ft 2 in)	88 kg (194 lb)	11 December 1974	(Greece) Panionios

Head coach: Alessandro Campagna

Group play

Team	Pld	W	D	L	GF	GA	GD	Pts	Qualification
Hungary	5	4	1	0	60	36	+24	9	Qualified for the semifinals
Spain	5	4	0	1	52	34	+18	8	Qualified for the quarterfinals
Montenegro	5	2	2	1	43	33	+10	6	Qualified for the quarterfinals
Australia	5	2	1	2	45	40	+5	5	Will play for places 7–10
Greece	5	1	0	4	39	56	−17	2	Will play for places 7–12
Canada	5	0	0	5	21	61	−40	0	Will play for places 7–12

All times are China Standard Time (UTC+8).

10 August 2008; 14:00	Report	Australia	12–8	Greece	Ying Tung Natatorium, Beijing; Referees: Bock (GER), Chaney (USA)
10 August 2008; 14:00	Report	Score by quarters: 5–5, 4–3, 2–0, 1–0			Ying Tung Natatorium, Beijing; Referees: Bock (GER), Chaney (USA)
10 August 2008; 14:00	Report	Figlioli 4, McGregor 3	Goals	Ntoskas 3	Ying Tung Natatorium, Beijing; Referees: Bock (GER), Chaney (USA)

12 August 2008; 14:00	Report	Greece	6–17	Hungary	Ying Tung Natatorium, Beijing; Referees: Rak (CRO), Ciric (SRB)
12 August 2008; 14:00	Report	Score by quarters: 2–7, 2–2, 1–4, 1–4			Ying Tung Natatorium, Beijing; Referees: Rak (CRO), Ciric (SRB)
12 August 2008; 14:00	Report	Schizas 2	Goals	Biros 4, Benedek 3, Madaras 2, Dá. Varga 2, Molnár 2	Ying Tung Natatorium, Beijing; Referees: Rak (CRO), Ciric (SRB)

14 August 2008; 14:00	Report	Montenegro	10–6	Greece	Ying Tung Natatorium, Beijing; Referees: Tulga (TUR), Margeta (SLO)
14 August 2008; 14:00	Report	Score by quarters: 3–1, 2–1, 5–2, 0–2			Ying Tung Natatorium, Beijing; Referees: Tulga (TUR), Margeta (SLO)
14 August 2008; 14:00	Report	M. Janović 2, Zloković 2, Gojković 2, Jokić 2	Goals	Ntoskas 2	Ying Tung Natatorium, Beijing; Referees: Tulga (TUR), Margeta (SLO)

16 August 2008; 10:50	Report	Canada	7–13	Greece	Ying Tung Natatorium, Beijing; Referees: Hart (AUS), Ni (CHN)
16 August 2008; 10:50	Report	Score by quarters: 1–6, 4–5, 2–1, 0–1			Ying Tung Natatorium, Beijing; Referees: Hart (AUS), Ni (CHN)
16 August 2008; 10:50	Report	Graham 3, Feltham 3	Goals	Ntoskas 4, Theodoropoulos 3	Ying Tung Natatorium, Beijing; Referees: Hart (AUS), Ni (CHN)

18 August 2008; 15:20	Report	Spain	10–6	Greece	Ying Tung Natatorium, Beijing; Referees: Rak (CRO), Simion (ROU)
18 August 2008; 15:20	Report	Score by quarters: 2–0, 3–0, 3–5, 2–1			Ying Tung Natatorium, Beijing; Referees: Rak (CRO), Simion (ROU)
18 August 2008; 15:20	Report	F. Perrone 7	Goals	Theodoropoulos 2	Ying Tung Natatorium, Beijing; Referees: Rak (CRO), Simion (ROU)

Classification quarterfinal

20 August 2008; 10:50	Report	Greece	13–8	China	Ying Tung Natatorium, Beijing; Referees: Balfanbayev (KAZ), Knights (NZL)
20 August 2008; 10:50	Report	Score by quarters: 3–1, 4–4, 2–0, 4–3			Ying Tung Natatorium, Beijing; Referees: Balfanbayev (KAZ), Knights (NZL)
20 August 2008; 10:50	Report	Ntoskas 4, G. Afroudakis 3, C. Afroudakis 2	Goals	Xie 3, Wang Yo. 2	Ying Tung Natatorium, Beijing; Referees: Balfanbayev (KAZ), Knights (NZL)

Classification semifinal

22 August 2008; 17:00	Report	Germany	9–13	Greece	Ying Tung Natatorium, Beijing; Referees: Ciric (SRB), Patelli (BRA)
22 August 2008; 17:00	Report	Score by quarters: 3–3, 1–3, 2–4, 3–3			Ying Tung Natatorium, Beijing; Referees: Ciric (SRB), Patelli (BRA)
22 August 2008; 17:00	Report	Nossek 3, Schertwitis 2, Kreuzmann 2	Goals	Ntoskas 6, Schizas 3, Theodoropoulos 2	Ying Tung Natatorium, Beijing; Referees: Ciric (SRB), Patelli (BRA)

Classification 7th–8th

24 August 2008; 10:50	Report	Australia	8–9	Greece	Ying Tung Natatorium, Beijing; Referees: Simion (ROU), Pinker (RSA)
24 August 2008; 10:50	Report	Score by quarters: 2–3, 2–2, 3–1, 1–3			Ying Tung Natatorium, Beijing; Referees: Simion (ROU), Pinker (RSA)
24 August 2008; 10:50	Report	Figlioli 3, Campbell 2, Martin 2	Goals	Schizas 2, C. Afroudakis 2	Ying Tung Natatorium, Beijing; Referees: Simion (ROU), Pinker (RSA)

=== Women's tournament ===
Roster

The following is the Greek roster in the women's water polo tournament of the 2008 Summer Olympics.

№	Name	Pos.	Height	Weight	Date of birth	Club
1	Georgia Ellinaki	GK	1.74 m (5 ft 9 in)	64 kg (141 lb)	28 February 1974	(Greece) Ethnikos Piraeus
2	Christina Tsoukala	CB	1.84 m (6 ft 0 in)	80 kg (180 lb)	8 July 1991	(Greece) Vouliagmeni
3	Angeliki Gerolymou	D	1.68 m (5 ft 6 in)	70 kg (150 lb)	22 June 1982	(Greece) Vouliagmeni
4	Sofia Iosifidou	CB	1.73 m (5 ft 8 in)	61 kg (134 lb)	13 January 1981	(Greece) Ethnikos Piraeus
5	Kyriaki Liosi	D	1.70 m (5 ft 7 in)	63 kg (139 lb)	30 October 1979	(Greece) Vouliagmeni
6	Stavroula Kozompoli	CF	1.80 m (5 ft 11 in)	73 kg (161 lb)	14 January 1974	(Greece) Nireas Chalandriou
7	Aikaterini Oikonomopoulou	CB	1.80 m (5 ft 11 in)	60 kg (130 lb)	16 February 1978	(Greece) ANO Glyfada
8	Antigoni Roumpesi	D	1.77 m (5 ft 10 in)	80 kg (180 lb)	19 July 1983	(Greece) Vouliagmeni
9	Evangelia Moraitidou	CB	1.84 m (6 ft 0 in)	74 kg (163 lb)	16 March 1975	(Greece) ANO Glyfada
10	Alexandra Asimaki	CF	1.71 m (5 ft 7 in)	61 kg (134 lb)	28 June 1988	(Greece) Vouliagmeni
11	Stavroula Antonakou	D	1.70 m (5 ft 7 in)	57 kg (126 lb)	2 May 1982	(Greece) Ethnikos Piraeus
12	Georgia Lara	CF	1.75 m (5 ft 9 in)	78 kg (172 lb)	31 May 1980	(Greece) Vouliagmeni
13	Maria Tsouri	GK	1.66 m (5 ft 5 in)	60 kg (130 lb)	25 May 1986	(Greece) ANO Glyfada

Head coach: Kyriakos Iosifidis

Group play

Team	Pld	W	D	L	GF	GA	GD	Pts	Qualification
Hungary	3	2	1	0	28	20	+8	5	Qualified for semifinals
Australia	3	2	1	0	25	22	+3	5	Qualified for quarterfinals
Netherlands	3	1	0	2	27	27	0	2	Qualified for quarterfinals
Greece	3	0	0	3	16	27	−11	0	Will play for places 7th–8th

All times are China Standard Time (UTC+8).

11 August 2008; 15:40	Report	Greece	6–8	Australia	Ying Tung Natatorium, Beijing; Referees: Decio Jr Patelli (BRA), Boris Margeta (SLO)
11 August 2008; 15:40	Report	Score by quarters: 2–5, 2–2, 1–1, 1–0			Ying Tung Natatorium, Beijing; Referees: Decio Jr Patelli (BRA), Boris Margeta (SLO)
11 August 2008; 15:40	Report	Roumpesi 3, Liosi 2	Goals	Beadsworth 4, Gofers 2	Ying Tung Natatorium, Beijing; Referees: Decio Jr Patelli (BRA), Boris Margeta (SLO)

13 August 2008; 14:20	Report	Greece	6–9	Netherlands	Ying Tung Natatorium, Beijing; Referees: Shiwei Ni (CHN), Decio Jr Patelli (BRA)
13 August 2008; 14:20	Report	Score by quarters: 3–3, 2–2, 1–3, 0–1			Ying Tung Natatorium, Beijing; Referees: Shiwei Ni (CHN), Decio Jr Patelli (BRA)
13 August 2008; 14:20	Report	Liosi 2	Goals	Cabout 4, de Bruijn 2, van Belkum 2	Ying Tung Natatorium, Beijing; Referees: Shiwei Ni (CHN), Decio Jr Patelli (BRA)

15 August 2008; 15:40	Report	Hungary	10–4	Greece	Ying Tung Natatorium, Beijing; Referees: Alan Balfanbayev (KAZ), Decio Jr Patelli (BRA)
15 August 2008; 15:40	Report	Score by quarters: 1–1, 3–1, 3–0, 3–2			Ying Tung Natatorium, Beijing; Referees: Alan Balfanbayev (KAZ), Decio Jr Patelli (BRA)
15 August 2008; 15:40	Report	Kisteleki 2, Stieber 2, Drávucz 2, Pelle 2	Goals	Gerolymou 1, Liosi 1, Roumpesi 1, Asimaki 1	Ying Tung Natatorium, Beijing; Referees: Alan Balfanbayev (KAZ), Decio Jr Patelli (BRA)

Classification 7th–8th

17 August 2008; 13:00	Report	Russia	12–6	Greece	Ying Tung Natatorium, Beijing; Referees: Stephen Knights (NZL), Guy Pinker (RSA)
17 August 2008; 13:00	Report	Score by quarters: 3–2, 4–1, 3–1, 2–2			Ying Tung Natatorium, Beijing; Referees: Stephen Knights (NZL), Guy Pinker (RSA)
17 August 2008; 13:00	Report	Shepelina 3, Konukh 3, Pantyulina 2, Belyaeva 2	Goals	Roumpesi 4	Ying Tung Natatorium, Beijing; Referees: Stephen Knights (NZL), Guy Pinker (RSA)

== Weightlifting ==
11 competitors were banned after testing positive for drugs.

Athlete	Event	Snatch		Clean & Jerk		Total	Rank
Athlete	Event	Result	Rank	Result	Rank	Total	Rank
Konstantinos Gkaripis	Men's −94 kg	160	16	200	13	360	14
Anastasios Triantafyllou	Men's −94 kg	155	17	196	15	351	15
Nikolaos Kourtidis	Men's −105 kg	176	12	221	9	397	9
Victoria Mavridou	Women's +75 kg	105	9	126	10	231	9

== Wrestling ==
Key:

- VT – Victory by Fall.
- PP – Decision by Points – the loser with technical points.
- PO – Decision by Points – the loser without technical points.

Men's freestyle

Athlete	Event	Qualification	Round of 16	Quarterfinals	Semifinals	Repechage 1	Repechage 2	Final / BM	
Athlete	Event	Opposition Result	Opposition Result	Opposition Result	Opposition Result	Opposition Result	Opposition Result	Opposition Result	Rank
Emzarios Bentinidis	−74 kg	Bye	Gentry (CAN); W 3–1 ^{PP}	Tigiev (UZB); L 0–3 ^{PO}	Did not advance	Bye	Ştefan (ROU); L 1–3 ^{PP}	Did not advance	9

Men's Greco-Roman

Athlete	Event	Qualification	Round of 16	Quarterfinals	Semifinals	Repechage 1	Repechage 2	Final / BM	
Athlete	Event	Opposition Result	Opposition Result	Opposition Result	Opposition Result	Opposition Result	Opposition Result	Opposition Result	Rank
Theodoros Tounousidis	−96 kg	Bye	Nozadze (GEO); L 1–3 ^{PP}	Did not advance					=17
Panagiotis Papadopoulos	−120 kg	Liu Dl (CHN); L 1–3 ^{PP}	Did not advance						18

== See also ==
- Greece at the 2008 Summer Paralympics
