= Hong Kong at the 2008 Summer Olympics =

- IOC code: HKG
- NOC: Sports Federation and Olympic Committee of Hong Kong, China
- Website: www.hkolympic.org (in Chinese and English)

in Beijing
- Competitors: 34 in 11 sports
- Flag bearers: Wong Kam-Po (opening); Lau Hiu Fung (closing)
- Medals: Gold 0 Silver 0 Bronze 0 Total 0

Summer Olympics appearances (overview)
- 1952; 1956; 1960; 1964; 1968; 1972; 1976; 1980; 1984; 1988; 1992; 1996; 2000; 2004; 2008; 2012; 2016; 2020; 2024

Hong Kong was represented at the 2008 Summer Olympics in Beijing, China by the Sports Federation and Olympic Committee of Hong Kong, China.

In total, 34 athletes including 17 men and 17 women represented Hong Kong in 11 different sports including athletics, badminton, cycling, equestrian, fencing, rowing, sailing, shooting, swimming, table tennis and triathlon.

Hong Kong was also the host of the equestrian competitions at the Hong Kong Equestrian Venues.

== Background ==
The Hong Kong Equestrian Venues in Hong Kong was chosen as the host for the equestrian events at the 2008 Summer Olympics.

== Competitors ==
In total, 34 athletes represented Hong Kong at the 2008 Summer Olympics in Beijing, China across 11 different sports.

Sport	Men	Women	Total
Athletics	1	1	2
Badminton	1	2	3
Cycling	3	1	4
Equestrian	2	1	3
Fencing	1	2	3
Rowing	3	1	4
Sailing	1	1	2
Shooting	1	0	1
Swimming	0	4	4
Table tennis	3	3	6
Triathlon	1	1	2
Total	17	17	34

== Athletics ==
In total, two Hong Konger athletes participated in the athletics events – Lai Chun Ho in the men's 100 m and Wan Kin Yee in the women's 100 m.

Men

Athlete	Event	Heat		Quarterfinal		Semifinal		Final	
Athlete	Event	Result	Rank	Result	Rank	Result	Rank	Result	Rank
Lai Chun Ho	100 m	10.63	7	Did not advance					

Women

Athlete	Event	Heat		Quarterfinal		Semifinal		Final	
Athlete	Event	Result	Rank	Result	Rank	Result	Rank	Result	Rank
Wan Kin Yee	100 m	12.37	6	Did not advance					

== Badminton ==
In total, three Hong Konger athletes participated in the badminton events – Ng Wei in the men's singles and Wang Chen and Yip Pui Yin in the women's singles.

Athlete	Event	Round of 64	Round of 32	Round of 16	Quarterfinal	Semifinal	Final / BM	
Athlete	Event	Opposition Score	Opposition Score	Opposition Score	Opposition Score	Opposition Score	Opposition Score	Rank
Ng Wei	Men's singles	Lin D (CHN); L 11–21, 12–21	Did not advance					
Wang Chen	Women's singles	Bye	Sládeková (SVK); W 21–7, 21–7	Nehwal (IND); L 19–21, 21–11, 11–21	Did not advance			
Yip Pui Yin	Women's singles	Hallam (GBR); L 15–21, 17–21	Did not advance					

== Cycling ==
In total, four Hong Konger athletes participated in the cycling events – Wu Kin San in the men's road race, Wong Kam-Po in the men's points race, Wan Yiu Jamie Wong in the women's points race and Chan Chun Hing in the men's cross-country.

=== Road ===
Wu Kin San was the first Hong Kong athlete to successfully complete the cycling road race.

Athlete	Event	Time	Rank
Wu Kin San	Men's road race	7:05:57	89

=== Track ===
Omnium

Athlete	Event	Points	Laps	Rank
Wong Kam-Po	Men's points race	5	0	15
Wan Yiu Jamie Wong	Women's points race	0	0	15

=== Mountain biking ===
Athlete	Event	Time	Rank
Chan Chun Hing	Men's cross-country	Did not finish	

== Equestrian ==
In total, three Hong Konger athletes participated in the equestrian events – Kenneth Cheng, Patrick Lam and Samantha Lam in the individual jumping.

Hong Kong competitors took part in the Olympic equestrian events for the first time. Jennifer Lee withdrew due to health problems with her horse, Mr Burns.

Athlete	Horse	Event	Qualification								Final					Total	
Athlete	Horse	Event	Round 1		Round 2			Round 3			Round A		Round B			Total	
Athlete	Horse	Event	Penalties	Rank	Penalties	Total	Rank	Penalties	Total	Rank	Penalties	Rank	Penalties	Total	Rank	Penalties	Rank
Kenneth Cheng	Can Do	Individual	6	=46 Q	21	27	57	Did not advance								27	57
Patrick Lam	Urban	Individual	0	=1 Q	9	9	=22 Q	36	45	46	Did not advance					45	46
Samantha Lam	Tresor	Individual	14	=66 Q	29	43	=63	Did not advance								43	=63
Kenneth Cheng; Patrick Lam; Samantha Lam	See above	Team	—								59	15	Did not advance			59	15

== Fencing ==
In total, three Hong Konger athletes participated in the fencing events – Lau Kwok Kin in the men's foil, Yeung Chui Ling in the women's épée and Chow Tsz Ki in the women's sabre.

Men

Athlete	Event	Round of 32	Round of 16	Quarterfinal	Semifinal	Final / BM	
Athlete	Event	Opposition Score	Opposition Score	Opposition Score	Opposition Score	Opposition Score	Rank
Lau Kwok Kin	Individual foil	Chida (JPN); L 6–15	Did not advance				

Women

Athlete	Event	Round of 64	Round of 32	Round of 16	Quarterfinal	Semifinal	Final / BM	
Athlete	Event	Opposition Score	Opposition Score	Opposition Score	Opposition Score	Opposition Score	Opposition Score	Rank
Yeung Chui Ling	Individual épée	—	Mincza-Nebald (HUN); L 11–15	Did not advance				
Chow Tsz Ki	Individual sabre	Bye	Bao Yy (CHN); L 5–15	Did not advance				

== Rowing ==
In total, four Hong Konger athletes participated in the rowing events – Law Hiu Fung in the men's single sculls, Chow Kwong Wing and So Sau Wah in the men's lightweight double sculls and Lee Ka Man in the women's single sculls.

Men

Athlete	Event	Heats		Repechage		Quarterfinals		Semifinals		Final	
Athlete	Event	Time	Rank	Time	Rank	Time	Rank	Time	Rank	Time	Rank
Law Hiu Fung	Single sculls	7:45.96	3 QF	—		7:29.21	6 SC/D	7:32.61	6 FD	7:06.17	20
Chow Kwong Wing; So Sau Wah	Lightweight double sculls	6:34.51	4 R	6:58.71	5 SC/D	—		6:33.79	3 FC	6:34.48	16

Women

Athlete	Event	Heats		Quarterfinals		Semifinals		Final	
Athlete	Event	Time	Rank	Time	Rank	Time	Rank	Time	Rank
Lee Ka Man	Single sculls	8:23.02	5 QF	8:04.68	6 SC/D	8:30.80	6 FE	7:56.07	23

Qualification Legend: FA=Final A (medal); FB=Final B (non-medal); FC=Final C (non-medal); FD=Final D (non-medal); FE=Final E (non-medal); FF=Final F (non-medal); SA/B=Semifinals A/B; SC/D=Semifinals C/D; SE/F=Semifinals E/F; QF=Quarterfinals; R=Repechage

== Sailing ==
In total, two Hong Konger athletes participated in the sailings events – Chan King Yin in the men's sailboard and Chan Wai Kei in the women's sailboard.

Men

Athlete	Event	Race											Net points	Final rank
Athlete	Event	1	2	3	4	5	6	7	8	9	10	M*	Net points	Final rank
Chan King Yin	RS:X	5	4	2	5	3	~~33~~	21	27	7	8	2	84	6

Women

Athlete	Event	Race											Net points	Final rank
Athlete	Event	1	2	3	4	5	6	7	8	9	10	M*	Net points	Final rank
Chan Wai Kei	RS:X	10	10	6	13	7	12	6	7	~~14~~	4	18	93	9

M = Medal race; EL = Eliminated – did not advance into the medal race; CAN = Race cancelled;

== Shooting ==
In total, one Hong Konger athlete participated in the shooting events – Wong Fai in the women's 25 m rapid fire pistol.

Athlete	Event	Qualification		Final	
Athlete	Event	Points	Rank	Points	Rank
Wong Fai	25 m rapid fire pistol	558	18	Did not advance	

== Swimming ==
In total, four Hong Konger athletes participated in the swimming events – Hoi Shun Stephanie Au in the women's 200 m freestyle, the women's 400 m freestyle and the women's 800 m freestyle, Yu Ning Elaine Chan in the women's 50 m freestyle, Hiu Wai Sherry Tsai in the women's 100 m backstroke and the women's 200 m individual medley and Hannah Jane Arnett Wilson in the women's 100 m freestyle and the women's 100 m butterfly.

Athlete	Event	Heat		Semifinal		Final	
Athlete	Event	Time	Rank	Time	Rank	Time	Rank
Hoi Shun Stephanie Au	200 m freestyle	2:00.85 NR	31	Did not advance			
Hoi Shun Stephanie Au	400 m freestyle	4:14.82	24	—		Did not advance	
Hoi Shun Stephanie Au	800 m freestyle	8:41.66	29	—		Did not advance	
Yu Ning Elaine Chan	50 m freestyle	26.54	44	Did not advance			
Hiu Wai Sherry Tsai	100 m backstroke	1:02.68	34	Did not advance			
Hiu Wai Sherry Tsai	200 m individual medley	2:18.91 NR	33	Did not advance			
Hannah Jane Arnett Wilson	100 m freestyle	55.32 NR	26	Did not advance			
Hannah Jane Arnett Wilson	100 m butterfly	59.35 NR	30	Did not advance			

== Table tennis ==
In total, six Hong Konger athletes participated in the table tennis events – Cheung Yuk, Ko Lai Chak and Li Ching in the men's singles and the men's team and Lau Sui Fei, Lin Ling and Tie Ya Na in the women's singles and the women's team.

Men's

Athlete	Event	Preliminary round	Round 1	Round 2	Round 3	Round 4	Quarterfinals	Semifinals	Final / BM	
Athlete	Event	Opposition Result	Opposition Result	Opposition Result	Opposition Result	Opposition Result	Opposition Result	Opposition Result	Opposition Result	Rank
Cheung Yuk	Singles	Bye			Persson (SWE); L 1–4	Did not advance				
Ko Lai Chak	Singles	Bye		Gionis (GRE); W 4–3	Ryu S-M (KOR); W 4–2	Ovtcharov (GER); W 4–1	Wang H (CHN); L 1–4	Did not advance		
Li Ching	Singles	Bye			Jang S-M (PRK); W 4–1	Tan Rw (CRO); L 2–4	Did not advance			

Women's

Athlete	Event	Preliminary round	Round 1	Round 2	Round 3	Round 4	Quarterfinals	Semifinals	Final / BM	
Athlete	Event	Opposition Result	Opposition Result	Opposition Result	Opposition Result	Opposition Result	Opposition Result	Opposition Result	Opposition Result	Rank
Lau Sui Fei	Singles	Bye		Xian Y F (FRA); W 4–1	Guo Y (CHN); L 0–4	Did not advance				
Lin Ling	Singles	Bye			Kostromina (BLR); W 4–0	Li Jw (SIN); L 3–4	Did not advance			
Tie Ya Na	Singles	Bye			Shen Yf (ESP); W 4–1	Li Qb (AUT); W 4–3	Wang N (CHN); L 1–4	Did not advance		

Team

Athlete	Event	Group round		Semifinals	Bronze playoff 1	Bronze playoff 2	Bronze medal	Final	
Athlete	Event	Opposition Result	Rank	Opposition Result	Opposition Result	Opposition Result	Opposition Result	Opposition Result	Rank
Cheung Yuk; Ko Lai Chak; Li Ching	Men's team	Group D Japan; L 0 – 3 Nigeria; W 3 – 0 Russia; W 3 – 1	2	Did not advance	Chinese Taipei; W 3 – 0	South Korea; L 1 – 3	Did not advance		
Lau Sui Fei; Lin Ling; Tie Ya Na	Women's team	Group C Romania; W 3 – 0 Poland; W 3 – 0 Germany; W 3 – 0	1 Q	China; L 0 – 3	Bye	Japan; L 2 – 3	Did not advance		

== Triathlon ==
In total, two Hong Konger athletes participated in the triathlon events – Daniel Chi Wo Lee in the men's race and Tania So Ning Mak in the women's race.

Athlete	Event	Swim (1.5 km)	Trans 1	Bike (40 km)	Trans 2	Run (10 km)	Total Time	Rank
Daniel Chi Wo Lee	Men's	18:54	0:28	58:24	0:32	36:22	1:54:40.78	43
Tania So Ning Mak	Women's	21:18	Lapped					

== See also ==
- Hong Kong at the 2008 Summer Paralympics
