= Rowing at the 2014 Asian Games – Men's lightweight double sculls =

Men's lightweight double sculls at the 2014 Asian Games
- Venue: Tangeum Lake
- Date: 20–24 September 2014
- Competitors: 20 from 10 nations

Medalists
gold medal	Takahiro Suda; Hideki Omoto	Japan
silver medal	Chow Kwong Wing; Tang Chiu Mang	Hong Kong
bronze medal	Dong Tianfeng; Kong Deming	China

The men's lightweight double sculls competition at the 2014 Asian Games in Chungju, South Korea was held from 20 September to 24 September at the Tangeum Lake International Rowing Center.

== Schedule ==
All times are Korea Standard Time (UTC+09:00)

Date	Time	Event
Saturday, 20 September 2014	10:40	Heats
Monday, 22 September 2014	10:20	Repechage
Wednesday, 24 September 2014	10:10	Finals

== Results ==
=== Heats ===
- Qualification: 1–2 → Final A (FA), 3–5 → Repechage (R)

==== Heat 1 ====
Rank	Team	Time	Notes
1	Japan (JPN); Takahiro Suda; Hideki Omoto	6:33.45	FA
2	India (IND); Roopendra Singh; Manjeet Singh	6:44.51	FA
3	Philippines (PHI); Edgar Ilas; Nestor Cordova	6:54.52	R
4	Indonesia (INA); Arief; Thomas Hallatu	6:54.82	R
5	Pakistan (PAK); Tanveer Arif; Muhammad Masood	7:24.94	R

==== Heat 2 ====
Rank	Team	Time	Notes
1	China (CHN); Dong Tianfeng; Kong Deming	6:37.88	FA
2	Hong Kong (HKG); Chow Kwong Wing; Tang Chiu Mang	6:38.55	FA
3	Thailand (THA); Porntawat Inlee; Jaruwat Saensuk	6:53.24	R
4	Kazakhstan (KAZ); Artyom Issupov; Yevgeniy Tatsey	6:55.57	R
5	Uzbekistan (UZB); Doston Oripov; Sabrillo Barotov	6:59.54	R

=== Repechage ===
- Qualification: 1–2 → Final A (FA), 3–6 → Final B (FB)

Rank	Team	Time	Notes
1	Philippines (PHI); Edgar Ilas; Nestor Cordova	6:40.95	FA
2	Thailand (THA); Porntawat Inlee; Jaruwat Saensuk	6:41.12	FA
3	Uzbekistan (UZB); Doston Oripov; Sabrillo Barotov	6:44.79	FB
4	Kazakhstan (KAZ); Artyom Issupov; Yevgeniy Tatsey	6:48.96	FB
5	Indonesia (INA); Arief; Thomas Hallatu	6:49.82	FB
6	Pakistan (PAK); Tanveer Arif; Muhammad Masood	7:17.12	FB

=== Finals ===
==== Final B ====
Rank	Team	Time
1	Uzbekistan (UZB); Doston Oripov; Sabrillo Barotov	6:55.99
2	Kazakhstan (KAZ); Artyom Issupov; Yevgeniy Tatsey	6:59.23
3	Indonesia (INA); Arief; Thomas Hallatu	7:01.09
4	Pakistan (PAK); Tanveer Arif; Muhammad Masood	7:44.00

==== Final A ====
Rank	Team	Time
1st place, gold medalist(s)	Japan (JPN); Takahiro Suda; Hideki Omoto	7:00.57
2nd place, silver medalist(s)	Hong Kong (HKG); Chow Kwong Wing; Tang Chiu Mang	7:05.69
3rd place, bronze medalist(s)	China (CHN); Dong Tianfeng; Kong Deming	7:10.70
4	India (IND); Roopendra Singh; Manjeet Singh	7:14.76
5	Thailand (THA); Porntawat Inlee; Jaruwat Saensuk	7:20.39
6	Philippines (PHI); Edgar Ilas; Nestor Cordova	7:36.03
