= India at the 2008 Summer Olympics =

- IOC code: IND
- NOC: Indian Olympic Association
- Website: olympic.ind.in

in Beijing
- Competitors: 67 in 12 sports
- Flag bearers: Rajyavardhan Singh Rathore (opening); Vijender Singh (closing)
- Medals Ranked 50th: Gold 1 Silver 0 Bronze 2 Total 3

Summer Olympics appearances (overview)
- 1900; 1904–1912; 1920; 1924; 1928; 1932; 1936; 1948; 1952; 1956; 1960; 1964; 1968; 1972; 1976; 1980; 1984; 1988; 1992; 1996; 2000; 2004; 2008; 2012; 2016; 2020; 2024

Other related appearances
- Pakistan (1948–pres.); Bangladesh (1984–pres.)

India competed at the 2008 Summer Olympics in Beijing, People's Republic of China. A contingent of 57 athletes in 12 sports represented India, and had a support staff of 42 officials.

For the first time since 1928, the men's national field hockey team failed to qualify for the Summer Olympics. A two-year ban imposed by the International Weightlifting Federation on Indian weightlifters after the 2006 Commonwealth Games doping scandal originally resulted in only one Olympic weightlifter, Monika Devi, from India being scheduled to compete, but she withdrew from the competition after failing the drug test. On 9 August 2008, IWF declared that she was clean, but the event she was supposed to participate in, had already closed.

On 11 August 2008, Abhinav Bindra won the gold medal in the men's 10 m air rifle. It was a huge achievement for India at the Olympic games shooting event. In doing so, he won the first ever individual gold medal for India, and the first medal in any event for India at the Beijing Games. The previous highest individual achievements for India were two silver medals won by Norman Pritchard, an Englishman born in India, at the 1900 Paris Olympics and one silver medal won by the 2008 flagbearer Rajyavardhan Rathore at the 2004 Athens Olympics. Sushil Kumar won the second ever wrestling medal for India, the first being the bronze earned by Khashaba Dadasaheb Jadhav in the 1952 Helsinki Olympics. Vijender Singh won a bronze medal in the middleweight boxing category, having lost in the semifinals. This was India's first-ever Olympic medal in boxing.

The 2008 Beijing Olympics saw the best ever performance by an Indian contingent, in terms of the number of medals (this record was later surpassed in 2012). They won three medals in all (one gold and two bronze medals), surpassing the two silvers by Norman Pritchard in 1900 Paris Olympics and the gold and bronze medals won by the Indian field hockey team and Khashaba Dadasaheb Jadhav respectively, at the 1952 Helsinki Olympics.

== Medalists ==
Medals	Name	Sport	Event	Date
Gold	Abhinav Bindra	Shooting	Men's 10 m air rifle	August 11
Bronze	Sushil Kumar	Wrestling	Men's freestyle 66 kg	August 20
Bronze	Vijender Singh	Boxing	Middleweight 75 kg	August 22

== Competitors ==
Sport	Men	Women	Total	Event
Archery	1	3	4	3
Athletics	3	13	16	9
Badminton	1	1	2	2
Boxing	5	0	5	5
Judo	0	2	2	2
Rowing	3	0	3	2
Sailing	1	0	1	1
Shooting	7	2	9	9
Swimming	4	0	4	7
Table tennis	1	1	2	2
Tennis	2	2	4	3
Wrestling	3	0	3	3
Total	31	25	56	48

== Archery ==
Athlete	Event	Ranking round		Round of 64	Round of 32	Round of 16	Quarterfinals	Semifinals	Final / BM	
Athlete	Event	Score	Seed	Opposition Score	Opposition Score	Opposition Score	Opposition Score	Opposition Score	Opposition Score	Rank
Mangal Champia	Men's individual	678	2	Hojjatolah (IRI) (63); W 112–98	Badenov (RUS) (31); L 108–109	Did not advance				
Dola Banerjee	Women's individual	633	31	Beaudet (CAN) (34); L 108 (8)–108 (10)	Did not advance					
Bombayala Devi	Women's individual	637	22	Marcinkiewicz (POL) (43); L 101–103	Did not advance					
Pranitha Vardhineni	Women's individual	627	37	Waller (AUS) (28); W 106–100	Kwon U.S. (PRK) (5); L 99–106	Did not advance				
Dola Banerjee; Bombayala Devi; Pranitha Vardhineni	Women's team	1897	6	—N/a		Bye	China (3); L 206–211	Did not advance		

== Athletics ==
Key

- Note–Ranks given for track events are within the athlete's heat only
- Q = Qualified for the next round
- q = Qualified for the next round as a fastest loser or, in field events, by position without achieving the qualifying target
- NR = National record
- N/A = Round not applicable for the event
- Bye = Athlete not required to compete in round

Men
Track & road events

Athlete	Event	Final	
Athlete	Event	Result	Rank
Surendra Singh	10000 m	28:13.97	26

Field events

Athlete	Event	Qualification		Final	
Athlete	Event	Distance	Position	Distance	Position
Vikas Gowda	Discus throw	60.69	22	Did not advance	
Renjith Maheswary	Triple jump	15.77	35	Did not advance	

Women
Track & road events

Athlete	Event	Heat		Semifinal		Final	
Athlete	Event	Result	Rank	Result	Rank	Result	Rank
Mandeep Kaur	400 m	52.88	6	Did not advance			
Preeja Sreedharan	10000 m	—N/a				32:34.64	25
Sathi Geetha; Mandeep Kaur; Manjeet Kaur; Sini Jose; Chitra Soman	4 × 400 m relay	3:28.83	7	—N/a		Did not advance	

Field events

Athlete	Event	Qualification		Final	
Athlete	Event	Distance	Position	Distance	Position
Anju Bobby George	Long jump	NM	—	Did not advance	
Harwant Kaur	Discus throw	56.42	30	Did not advance	
Krishna Poonia	Discus throw	58.23	24	Did not advance	

Combined events – Heptathlon

Athlete	Event	100H	HJ	SP	200 m	LJ	JT	800 m	Final	Rank
Pramila Aiyappa	Result	13.97	1.74	11.66	24.92	6.11	41.27	2:23.46	5771	27*
Pramila Aiyappa	Points	983	903	639	894	883	692	777	5771	27*
Shobha Javur	Result	13.62	1.65	13.07	24.62	5.86	43.50	2:27.50	5749	29*
Shobha Javur	Points	1033	795	732	922	807	735	725	5749	29*
Susmita Singha Roy	Result	14.11	1.71	11.27	24.34	5.98	39.79	2:21.14	5705	32*
Susmita Singha Roy	Points	963	867	613	948	843	663	808	5705	32*

* The athlete who finished in second place, Lyudmila Blonska of Ukraine, tested positive for a banned substance. Both the A and the B tests were positive, therefore Blonska was stripped of her silver medal, and all Indian heptathletes moved up a position.

== Badminton ==
Athlete	Event	Round of 64	Round of 32	Round of 16	Quarterfinal	Semifinal	Final / BM	
Athlete	Event	Opposition Score	Opposition Score	Opposition Score	Opposition Score	Opposition Score	Opposition Score	Rank
Anup Sridhar	Men's singles	Vasconcelos (POR); W 21–16, 21–14	Sato (JPN); L 13–21, 17–21	Did not advance				
Saina Nehwal	Women's singles	Diehl (RUS); W 21–9, 21–8	Griga (UKR); W 21–18, 21–10	Wang C (HKG); W 21–19, 11–21, 21–11	Yulianti (INA); L 28–26, 14–21, 15–21	Did not advance		

== Boxing ==
Athlete	Event	Round of 32	Round of 16	Quarterfinals	Semifinals	Final	
Athlete	Event	Opposition Result	Opposition Result	Opposition Result	Opposition Result	Opposition Result	Rank
Jitender Kumar	Flyweight	Memis (TUR); W WO	Doniyorov (UZB); W 13–6	Balakshin (RUS); L 11–15	Did not advance		
Akhil Kumar	Bantamweight	Hallab (FRA); W 12–5	Vodopyanov (RUS); W 9^{+}–9	Gojan (MDA); L 3–10	Did not advance		
Anthresh Lalit Lakra	Featherweight	Sultonov (UZB); L 5–9	Did not advance				
Vijender Singh	Middleweight	Jack (GAM); W 13–2	Chomphuphuang (THA); W 13–3	Góngora (ECU); W 9–4	Correa (CUB); L 5–8	Did not advance	3rd place, bronze medalist(s)
Dinesh Kumar	Light heavyweight	Benchabla (ALG); L 3–23	Did not advance				

== Judo ==
Athlete	Event	Round of 32	Round of 16	Quarterfinals	Semifinals	Repechage 1	Repechage 2	Repechage 3	Final / BM	
Athlete	Event	Opposition Result	Opposition Result	Opposition Result	Opposition Result	Opposition Result	Opposition Result	Opposition Result	Opposition Result	Rank
Khumujam Tombi Devi	Women's −48 kg	Hormigo (POR); L 0000–1011	Did not advance							
Divya Tewar	Women's −78 kg	Castillo (CUB); L 0000–1000	Did not advance			Abikeyeva (KAZ); L 0000–1010	Did not advance			

== Rowing ==
Men

Athlete	Event	Heats		Repechage		Quarterfinals		Semifinals		Final	
Athlete	Event	Time	Rank	Time	Rank	Time	Rank	Time	Rank	Time	Rank
Bajranglal Takhar	Single sculls	7:39.91	3 QF	—N/a		7:19.01	5 SC/D	7:23.00	4 FD	7:09.73	21
Devender Kumar Khandwal; Manjeet Singh	Lightweight double sculls	6:37.13	5 R	7:02.06	5 SC/D	—N/a		6:40.34	3 FC	6:44.48	18

Qualification Legend: FA=Final A (medal); FB=Final B (non-medal); FC=Final C (non-medal); FD=Final D (non-medal); FE=Final E (non-medal); FF=Final F (non-medal); SA/B=Semifinals A/B; SC/D=Semifinals C/D; SE/F=Semifinals E/F; QF=Quarterfinals; R=Repechage

== Sailing ==
Open

Athlete	Event	Race											Net points	Final rank
Athlete	Event	1	2	3	4	5	6	7	8	9	10	M*	Net points	Final rank
Nachhatar Singh Johal	Finn	4	~~24~~	23	24	11	24	18	24	CAN	CAN	EL	128	23

M = Medal race; EL = Eliminated – did not advance into the medal race; CAN = Race cancelled;

== Shooting ==
Men

Athlete	Event	Qualification		Final	
Athlete	Event	Points	Rank	Points	Rank
Abhinav Bindra	10 m air rifle	596	4	700.5	1st place, gold medalist(s)
Samaresh Jung	10 m air pistol	570	42	Did not advance	
Samaresh Jung	50 m pistol	540	42	Did not advance	
Gagan Narang	10 m air rifle	595	9	Did not advance	
Gagan Narang	50 m rifle prone	589	35	Did not advance	
Gagan Narang	50 m rifle 3 positions	1167	13	Did not advance	
Sanjeev Rajput	50 m rifle prone	591	26	Did not advance	
Sanjeev Rajput	50 m rifle 3 positions	1162	26	Did not advance	
Rajyavardhan Singh Rathore	Double trap	131	15	Did not advance	
Manavjit Singh Sandhu	Trap	116	12	Did not advance	
Mansher Singh	Trap	117	8	Did not advance	

Women

Athlete	Event	Qualification		Final	
Athlete	Event	Points	Rank	Points	Rank
Anjali Bhagwat	10 m air rifle	393	29	Did not advance	
Anjali Bhagwat	50 m rifle 3 positions	571	32	Did not advance	
Avneet Kaur Sidhu	10 m air rifle	389	39	Did not advance	
Avneet Kaur Sidhu	50 m rifle 3 positions	552	42	Did not advance	

== Swimming ==
Men

Athlete	Event	Heat		Semifinal		Final	
Athlete	Event	Time	Rank	Time	Rank	Time	Rank
Virdhawal Khade	50 m freestyle	22.73	40	Did not advance			
Virdhawal Khade	100 m freestyle	50.07	42	Did not advance			
Virdhawal Khade	200 m freestyle	1:51.86	48	Did not advance			
Rehan Poncha	200 m butterfly	2:01.89	40	Did not advance			
Ankur Poseria	100 m butterfly	54.74	57	Did not advance			
Sandeep Sejwal	100 m breaststroke	1:02.19	38	Did not advance			
Sandeep Sejwal	200 m breaststroke	2:15.24	36	Did not advance			

== Table tennis ==
Athlete	Event	Preliminary round	Round 1	Round 2	Round 3	Round 4	Quarterfinals	Semifinals	Final / BM	
Athlete	Event	Opposition Result	Opposition Result	Opposition Result	Opposition Result	Opposition Result	Opposition Result	Opposition Result	Opposition Result	Rank
Sharath Kamal	Men's singles	Bye	Carneros (ESP); W 4–2	Chen Wx (AUT); L 1–4	Did not advance					
Neha Aggarwal	Women's singles	Lay (AUS); L 1–4	Did not advance							

== Tennis ==
Athlete	Event	Round of 64	Round of 32	Round of 16	Quarterfinals	Semifinals	Final / BM	
Athlete	Event	Opposition Score	Opposition Score	Opposition Score	Opposition Score	Opposition Score	Opposition Score	Rank
Mahesh Bhupathi; Leander Paes	Men's doubles	—N/a	Monfils / Simon (FRA); W 6–3, 6–3	Melo / Sá (BRA); W 6–4, 6–2	Federer / Wawrinka (SUI); L 2–6, 4–6	Did not advance		
Sania Mirza	Women's singles	Benešová (CZE); L 1–6, 1–2^{r}	Did not advance					
Sania Mirza; Sunitha Rao	Women's doubles	—N/a	Golovin / Parmentier (FRA); W WO	Kuznetsova / Safina (RUS); L 4–6, 4–6	Did not advance			

== Wrestling ==
Key:

- VT - Victory by Fall.
- PP - Decision by Points - the loser with technical points.
- PO - Decision by Points - the loser without technical points.

Men's freestyle

Athlete	Event	Qualification	Round of 16	Quarterfinal	Semifinal	Repechage 1	Repechage 2	Final / BM	
Athlete	Event	Opposition Result	Opposition Result	Opposition Result	Opposition Result	Opposition Result	Opposition Result	Opposition Result	Rank
Yogeshwar Dutt	−60 kg	Bye	Orazgaliyev (KAZ); W 3–1 ^{PP}	Yumoto (JPN); L 1–3 ^{PP}	Did not advance				9
Sushil Kumar	−66 kg	Bye	Stadnik (UKR); L 1–3 ^{PP}	Did not advance		Schwab (USA); W 3–1 ^{PP}	Batyrov (BLR); W 3–1 ^{PP}	Spiridonov (KAZ); W 3–1 ^{PP}	3rd place, bronze medalist(s)
Rajiv Tomar	−120 kg	Mocco (USA); L 0–3 ^{PO}	Did not advance						17

== See also ==
- India at the Olympics
- Sports of India
