= Uruguay at the 2008 Summer Olympics =

- IOC code: URU
- NOC: Uruguayan Olympic Committee
- Website: www.cou.org.uy (in Spanish)

in Beijing
- Competitors: 12 in 6 sports
- Flag bearer: Alejandro Foglia
- Medals: Gold 0 Silver 0 Bronze 0 Total 0

Summer Olympics appearances (overview)
- 1924; 1928; 1932; 1936; 1948; 1952; 1956; 1960; 1964; 1968; 1972; 1976; 1980; 1984; 1988; 1992; 1996; 2000; 2004; 2008; 2012; 2016; 2020; 2024; 2028

Uruguay sent a team of 12 athletes to compete in the 2008 Summer Olympics held in Beijing, People's Republic of China from August 8 to August 24, 2008.

== Athletics ==
Key

- Note–Ranks given for track events are within the athlete's heat only
- Q = Qualified for the next round
- q = Qualified for the next round as a fastest loser or, in field events, by position without achieving the qualifying target
- NR = National record
- N/A = Round not applicable for the event
- Bye = Athlete not required to compete in round

Men

| Athlete | Event | Heat | | Quarterfinal | | Semifinal | | Final | |
| Athlete | Event | Result | Rank | Result | Rank | Result | Rank | Result | Rank |
|---|---|---|---|---|---|---|---|---|---|
| Andrés Silva | 400 m | 46.34 | 5 | —N/a | | Did not advance | | | |
| Heber Viera | 200 m | 20.93 | 6 | Did not advance | | | | | |

Women

| Athlete | Event | Heat | | Semifinal | | Final | |
| Athlete | Event | Result | Rank | Result | Rank | Result | Rank |
|---|---|---|---|---|---|---|---|
| Marcela Britos | 800 m | 2:08.98 | 8 | Did not advance | | | |

== Cycling ==
=== Track ===
Points Race

| Athlete | Event | Points | Laps | Rank |
|---|---|---|---|---|
| Milton Wynants | Men's points race | 5 | 0 | 16 |

== Rowing ==
Men

| Athlete | Event | Heats | | Repechage | | Quarterfinals | | Semifinals | | Final | |
| Athlete | Event | Time | Rank | Time | Rank | Time | Rank | Time | Rank | Time | Rank |
|---|---|---|---|---|---|---|---|---|---|---|---|
| Leandro Salvagno Rattaro | Single sculls | 7:52.53 | 4 QF | —N/a | | 7:26.85 | 6 SC/D | 7:32.83 | 4 FD | 7:04.13 | 19 |
| Rodolfo Collazo; Angel García | Lightweight double sculls | 6:25.86 | 4 R | 6:46.98 | 3 SC/D | —N/a | | 6:33.49 | 2 FC | 6:30.61 | 15 |

Qualification Legend: FA=Final A (medal); FB=Final B (non-medal); FC=Final C (non-medal); FD=Final D (non-medal); FE=Final E (non-medal); FF=Final F (non-medal); SA/B=Semifinals A/B; SC/D=Semifinals C/D; SE/F=Semifinals E/F; QF=Quarterfinals; R=Repechage

== Sailing ==
Men

| Athlete | Event | Race | | | | | | | | | | | Net points | Final rank |
| Athlete | Event | 1 | 2 | 3 | 4 | 5 | 6 | 7 | 8 | 9 | 10 | M* | Net points | Final rank |
|---|---|---|---|---|---|---|---|---|---|---|---|---|---|---|
| Alejandro Foglia | Laser | 12 | 27 | 33 | 7 | ~~36~~ | 4 | 6 | 26 | 18 | CAN | EL | 133 | 17 |

M = Medal race; EL = Eliminated – did not advance into the medal race; CAN = Race cancelled;

== Shooting ==
Women

| Athlete | Event | Qualification | | Final | |
| Athlete | Event | Points | Rank | Points | Rank |
|---|---|---|---|---|---|
| Carolina Lozado | 10 m air pistol | 367 | 43 | Did not advance | |

== Swimming ==
Men

| Athlete | Event | Heat | | Semifinal | | Final | |
| Athlete | Event | Time | Rank | Time | Rank | Time | Rank |
|---|---|---|---|---|---|---|---|
| Martín Kutscher | 100 m freestyle | 50.08 | 42 | Did not advance | | | |
| Martín Kutscher | 200 m freestyle | 1:49.61 | 36 | Did not advance | | | |
| Francisco Picasso | 50 m freestyle | 23.01 | 51 | Did not advance | | | |

Women

| Athlete | Event | Heat | | Semifinal | | Final | |
| Athlete | Event | Time | Rank | Time | Rank | Time | Rank |
|---|---|---|---|---|---|---|---|
| Antonella Scanavino | 100 m butterfly | 1:04.28 | 48 | Did not advance | | | |

== See also ==
- Uruguay at the 2008 Summer Paralympics
- Uruguay at the 2007 Pan American Games
