= Rowing at the 2010 Asian Games – Women's coxless pair =

Women's coxless pair at the 2010 Asian Games
- Venue: Guangzhou International Rowing Centre
- Date: 15–19 November 2010
- Competitors: 8 from 4 nations

Medalists
gold medal	Lin Hong; Sun Zhengping	China
silver medal	Oxana Nazarova; Svetlana Germanovich	Kazakhstan
bronze medal	Pramila Prava Minz; Pratima Puhan	India

The women's coxless pair competition at the 2010 Asian Games in Guangzhou, China was held from 15 November to 19 November at the International Rowing Centre.

== Schedule ==
All times are China Standard Time (UTC+08:00)

Date	Time	Event
Monday, 15 November 2010	11:10	Heat
Friday, 19 November 2010	11:15	Final

== Results ==
=== Heat ===
- Qualification: 1–4 → Final (FA)

Rank	Team	Time	Notes
1	China (CHN); Lin Hong; Sun Zhengping	7:27.31	FA
2	Kazakhstan (KAZ); Oxana Nazarova; Svetlana Germanovich	7:37.81	FA
3	India (IND); Pramila Prava Minz; Pratima Puhan	7:52.39	FA
4	Indonesia (INA); Femmy Yuartini Elia; Ratna	7:53.91	FA

=== Final ===
Rank	Team	Time
1st place, gold medalist(s)	China (CHN); Lin Hong; Sun Zhengping	7:22.06
2nd place, silver medalist(s)	Kazakhstan (KAZ); Oxana Nazarova; Svetlana Germanovich	7:35.13
3rd place, bronze medalist(s)	India (IND); Pramila Prava Minz; Pratima Puhan	7:47.50
4	Indonesia (INA); Femmy Yuartini Elia; Ratna	7:48.64
