= Rowing at the 2010 Asian Games – Men's double sculls =

Men's double sculls at the 2010 Asian Games
- Venue: Guangzhou International Rowing Centre
- Date: 14–18 November 2010
- Competitors: 12 from 6 nations

Medalists
gold medal	Su Hui; Zhang Liang	China
silver medal	Vyacheslav Didrih; Ruslan Naurzaliev	Uzbekistan
bronze medal	Kim Dong-yong; Kim Hwi-gwan	South Korea

The men's double sculls competition at the 2010 Asian Games in Guangzhou, China was held from 14 November to 18 November at the International Rowing Centre.

== Schedule ==
All times are China Standard Time (UTC+08:00)

Date	Time	Event
Sunday, 14 November 2010	10:10	Heat
Thursday, 18 November 2010	10:10	Final

== Results ==
=== Heat ===
- Qualification: 1–6 → Final (FA)

Rank	Team	Time	Notes
1	China (CHN); Su Hui; Zhang Liang	6:23.38	FA
2	Uzbekistan (UZB); Vyacheslav Didrih; Ruslan Naurzaliev	6:31.77	FA
3	Iran (IRI); Alireza Atabaki; Mojtaba Shojaei	6:36.20	FA
4	South Korea (KOR); Kim Dong-yong; Kim Hwi-gwan	6:38.55	FA
5	India (IND); Devender Kumar Khandwal; Anil Kumar Mehrolia	6:39.89	FA
6	Hong Kong (HKG); Law Hiu Fung; Lok Kwan Hoi	6:59.22	FA

=== Final ===
Rank	Team	Time
1st place, gold medalist(s)	China (CHN); Su Hui; Zhang Liang	6:29.74
2nd place, silver medalist(s)	Uzbekistan (UZB); Vyacheslav Didrih; Ruslan Naurzaliev	6:33.60
3rd place, bronze medalist(s)	South Korea (KOR); Kim Dong-yong; Kim Hwi-gwan	6:34.43
4	Hong Kong (HKG); Law Hiu Fung; Lok Kwan Hoi	6:36.06
5	Iran (IRI); Alireza Atabaki; Mojtaba Shojaei	6:39.02
6	India (IND); Devender Kumar Khandwal; Anil Kumar Mehrolia	6:49.34
