= Rowing at the 2010 South American Games – Men's double sculls =

The Men's double sculls event at the 2010 South American Games was held over March 21 at 9:40.

== Medalists ==
Gold	Silver	Bronze
Santiago Fernandez; Sebastian Fernandez; Argentina	Jhonatan Esquivel; Santiago Menese; Uruguay	Thiago Almeida; Thiago Carvalho; Brazil

== Records ==
World Best Time
World best time	France	6:03.25	Poznań, Poland	2006

== Results ==
Rank	Rowers	Country	Time
1st place, gold medalist(s)	Santiago Fernandez, Sebastian Fernandez	Argentina	6:41.91
2nd place, silver medalist(s)	Jhonatan Esquivel, Santiago Menese	Uruguay	6:44.63
3rd place, bronze medalist(s)	Thiago Almeida, Thiago Carvalho	Brazil	6:48.39
4	Emilio Torres, Saul Deviasso	Venezuela	6:48.74
