= Table tennis at the 2008 Summer Olympics =

Table tennis at the Games of the XXIX Olympiad
- Venue: Peking University Gymnasium
- Dates: August 13 to August 23, 2008
- Competitors: 171 from 56 nations

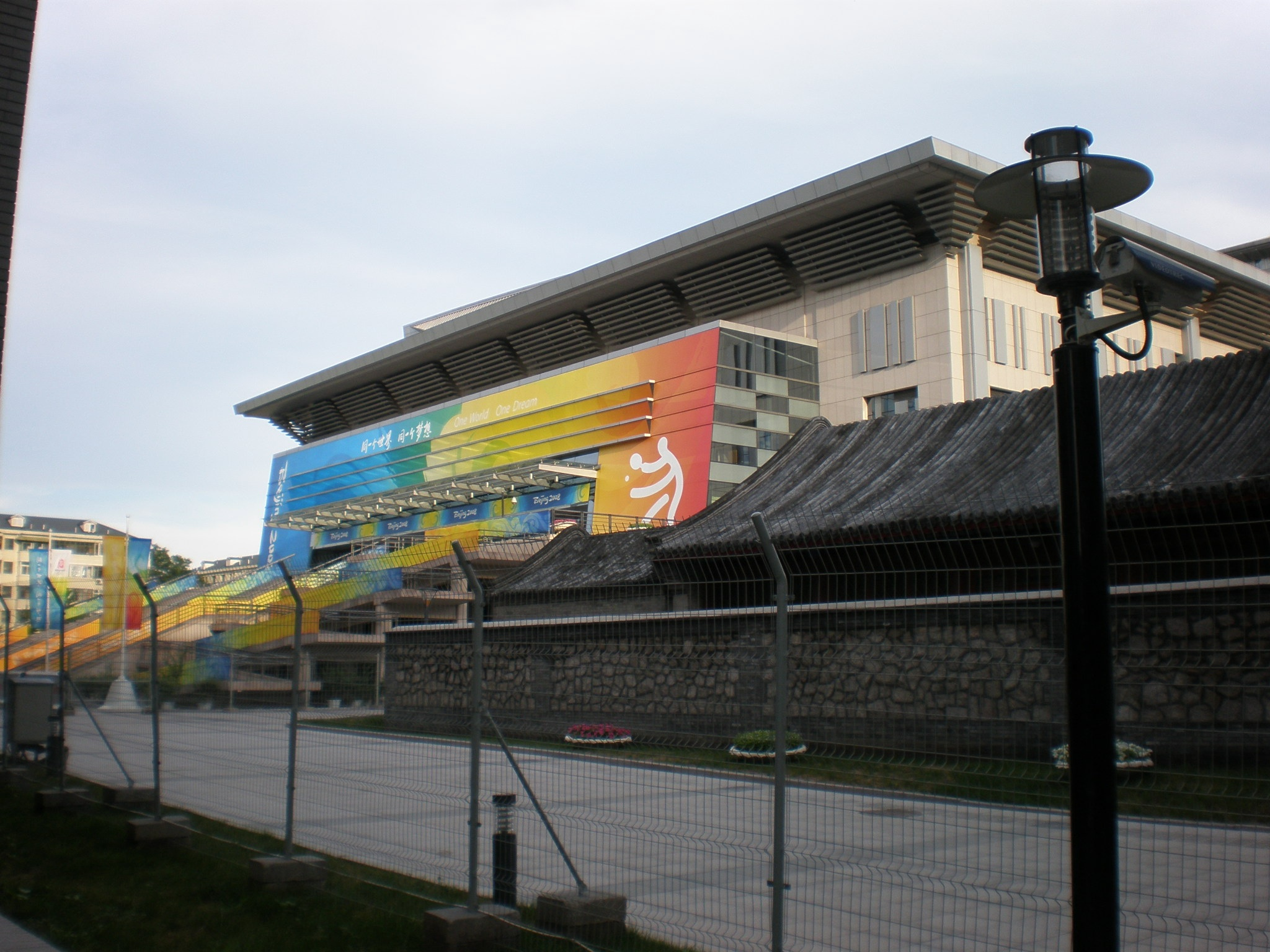
Peking University Gymnasium as the venue of the 2008 Summer Olympics

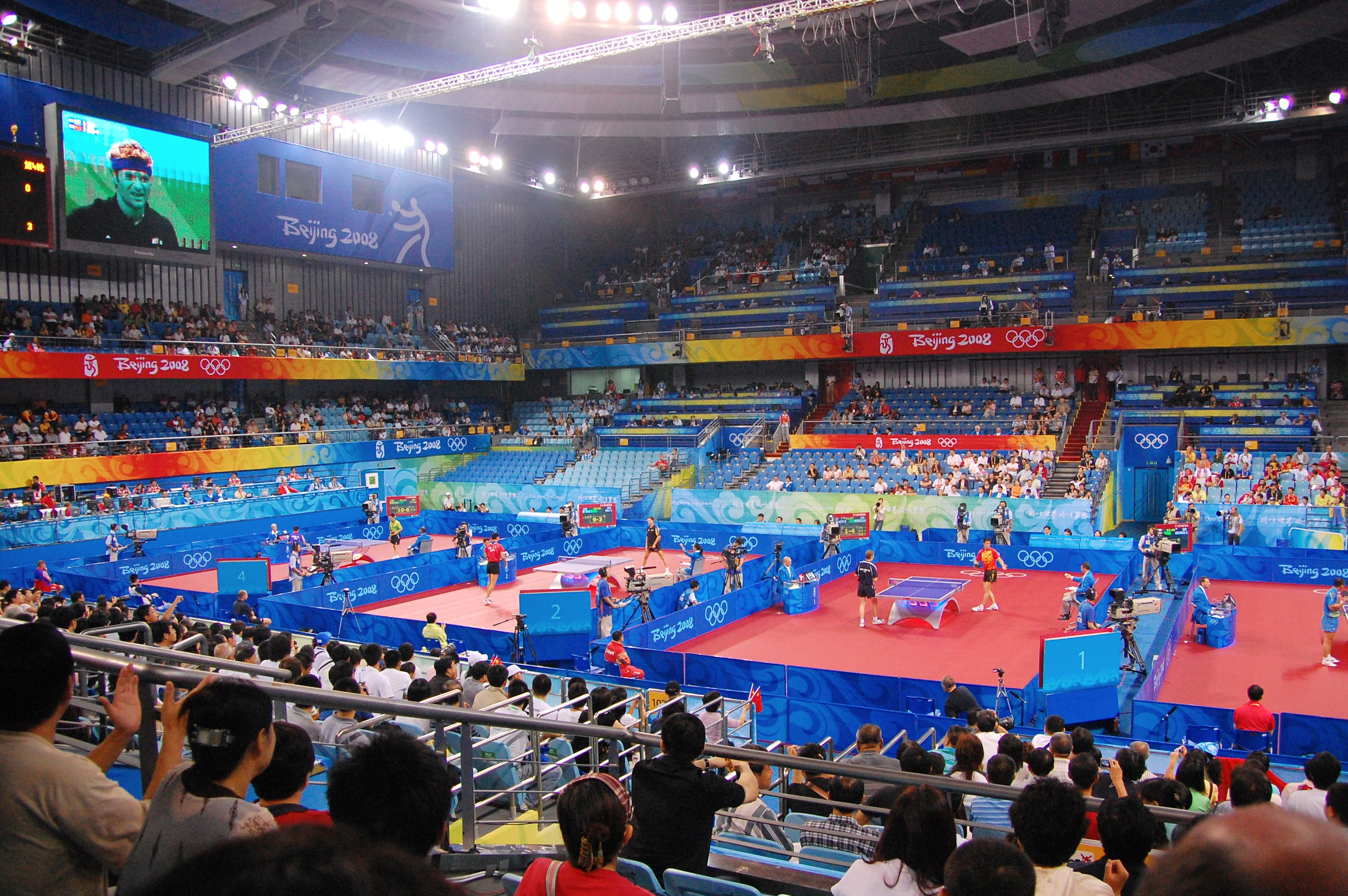
Inside the Peking University Gymnasium

Table tennis competitions at the 2008 Summer Olympics in Beijing were held from August 13 to August 23, at the Peking University Gymnasium. The competition featured the team events for the first time, replacing the doubles events competed in previous games. A total of four sets of medals were awarded for the four events contested. China, as the host country, would win every medal possible, claiming the podium in both the Men's and Women's Singles events and claiming Gold in both the Men's and Women's Team Event, leading the IOC and ITTF, to change the qualification process for the 2012 Summer Olympics, to ensure that countries could only enter 2, instead of 3 athletes into the Singles event.

== Competition schedule ==
P	Preliminary rounds	¼	Quarterfinals	B	Bronze playoff	½	Semifinals	F	Final

Event↓/Date →	Wed 13	Thu 14	Fri 15		Sat 16	Sun 17	Mon 18	Tue 19	Wed 20	Thu 21	Fri 22		Sat 23	
Men's singles								P			¼		½	F
Men's team	P		B		½	B	F							
Women's singles							P			¼	½	F		
Women's team	P		B	½	B	F								

== Participating nations ==
A total of 171 athletes (86 men and 85 women), representing 56 NOCs, competed in four events.

- Algeria (1)
- Argentina (2)
- Australia (6)
- Austria (6)
- Belarus (4)
- Belgium (1)
- Brazil (4)
- Cameroon (1)
- Canada (5)
- China (6)
- Colombia (1)
- Republic of the Congo (2)
- Croatia (6)
- Czech Republic (2)
- Denmark (1)
- Dominican Republic (4)
- Egypt (5)
- France (4)
- Germany (6)
- Greece (3)
- Hong Kong (6)
- Hungary (4)
- India (2)
- Iran (1)
- Italy (3)
- Japan (6)
- Jordan (1)
- Kazakhstan (1)
- Kuwait (1)
- Lithuania (1)
- Luxembourg (1)
- Mexico (1)
- Netherlands (3)
- Nigeria (6)
- North Korea (5)
- Paraguay (1)
- Poland (4)
- Portugal (3)
- Romania (4)
- Russia (5)
- Serbia (1)
- Singapore (6)
- Slovakia (1)
- Slovenia (1)
- South Korea (6)
- Spain (5)
- Sweden (3)
- Chinese Taipei (5)
- Thailand (1)
- Trinidad and Tobago (1)
- Turkey (2)
- Ukraine (3)
- United States (4)
- Vanuatu (1)
- Venezuela (1)
- Vietnam (1)

== Medal summary ==
=== Medal table ===
Rank	Nation	Gold	Silver	Bronze	Total
1	China	4	2	2	8
2	Germany	0	1	0	1
2	Singapore	0	1	0	1
4	South Korea	0	0	2	2
Totals (4 entries)		4	4	4	12

=== Events ===
Event	Gold	Silver	Bronze
Men's singles	Ma Lin; China	Wang Hao; China	Wang Liqin; China
Men's team	China; Ma Lin; Wang Hao; Wang Liqin	Germany; Christian Suss; Dimitrij Ovtcharov; Timo Boll	South Korea; Oh Sang-eun; Ryu Seung-min; Yoon Jae-young
Women's singles	Zhang Yining; China	Wang Nan; China	Guo Yue; China
Women's team	China; Guo Yue; Wang Nan; Zhang Yining	Singapore; Feng Tianwei; Li Jiawei; Wang Yuegu	South Korea; Dang Ye-seo; Kim Kyung-ah; Park Mi-young

== See also ==
- Table tennis at the 2008 Summer Paralympics
