= Mak So Ning =

Chinese triathlete (born 1986)

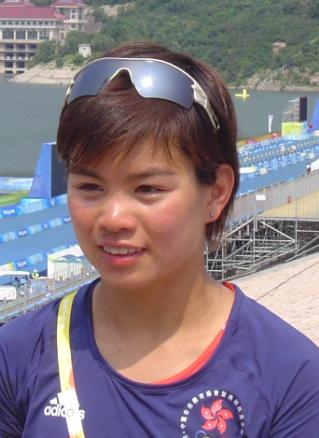
Mak at the 2008 Summer Olympics.

Mak So Ning "Tania" (Chinese: 麥素寧; Jyutping: mak^{6} sou^{3} ning^{4}, born November 5, 1986, in Hong Kong) is a Chinese triathlete who competed for Hong Kong at the 2008 Summer Olympics.

In 2008, she did not finish in the Olympic triathlon event after being lapped on the cycling course.
