= Rowing at the 2010 Asian Games – Men's lightweight coxless four =

Men's lightweight coxless four at the 2010 Asian Games
- Venue: Guangzhou International Rowing Centre
- Date: 14–18 November 2010
- Competitors: 24 from 6 nations

Medalists
| gold medal | Japan; Yoshinori Sato, Takahiro Suda, Yu Kataoka, Hideki Omoto |
| silver medal | India; Lokesh Kumar, Satish Joshi, Rajesh Kumar Yadav, Manjeet Singh |
| bronze medal | Hong Kong; Leung Chun Shek, Liao Shun Yin, Tang Chiu Mang, Kwan Ki Cheong |

The men's lightweight coxless four competition at the 2010 Asian Games in Guangzhou, China was held from 14 November to 18 November at the International Rowing Centre.

== Schedule ==
All times are China Standard Time (UTC+08:00)

| Date | Time | Event |
|---|---|---|
| Sunday, 14 November 2010 | 11:20 | Heat |
| Thursday, 18 November 2010 | 11:35 | Final |

== Results ==
=== Heat ===
- Qualification: 1–6 → Final (FA)

| Rank | Team | Time | Notes |
|---|---|---|---|
| 1 | Japan (JPN); Yoshinori Sato; Takahiro Suda; Yu Kataoka; Hideki Omoto | 6:14.70 | FA |
| 2 | India (IND); Lokesh Kumar; Satish Joshi; Rajesh Kumar Yadav; Manjeet Singh | 6:16.97 | FA |
| 3 | Indonesia (INA); Jamaluddin; Iswandi; Agus Budi Aji; Ali Darta Lakiki | 6:18.80 | FA |
| 4 | Hong Kong (HKG); Leung Chun Shek; Liao Shun Yin; Tang Chiu Mang; Kwan Ki Cheong | 6:19.00 | FA |
| 5 | North Korea (PRK); Kim Myong-il; Kim Chung-il; Kim Myong-nam; Kim Yong-hun | 6:25.50 | FA |
| 6 | Thailand (THA); Panupan Paisanwan; Somkid Phaothanom; Pongsaran Pantangthai; Leam Kangnok | 6:48.24 | FA |

=== Final ===
| Rank | Team | Time |
|---|---|---|
| 1st place, gold medalist(s) | Japan (JPN); Yoshinori Sato; Takahiro Suda; Yu Kataoka; Hideki Omoto | 6:10.14 |
| 2nd place, silver medalist(s) | India (IND); Lokesh Kumar; Satish Joshi; Rajesh Kumar Yadav; Manjeet Singh | 6:13.32 |
| 3rd place, bronze medalist(s) | Hong Kong (HKG); Leung Chun Shek; Liao Shun Yin; Tang Chiu Mang; Kwan Ki Cheong | 6:14.84 |
| 4 | Indonesia (INA); Jamaluddin; Iswandi; Agus Budi Aji; Ali Darta Lakiki | 6:16.34 |
| 5 | North Korea (PRK); Kim Myong-il; Kim Chung-il; Kim Myong-nam; Kim Yong-hun | 6:25.12 |
| 6 | Thailand (THA); Panupan Paisanwan; Somkid Phaothanom; Pongsaran Pantangthai; Leam Kangnok | 6:37.25 |
