= Cameron Sylvester =

Canadian rower (born 1986)

Personal information
- Born: 22 June 1986 (age 39) Mississauga, Ontario, Canada

Sport
- Sport: Rowing

Cameron Sylvester (born 22 June 1986) is a Canadian rower. He competed in the men's lightweight double sculls event at the 2008 Summer Olympics.
