= John Sasi =

Canadian rower

Personal information
- Born: 20 February 1979 (age 46); Hamilton, Ontario, Canada

Sport
- Sport: Rowing

John Sasi (born 20 February 1979) is a Canadian rower. He competed in the men's lightweight double sculls event at the 2008 Summer Olympics.
