= Rowing at the 2010 Asian Games – Men's lightweight single sculls =

Men's lightweight single sculls at the 2010 Asian Games
- Venue: Guangzhou International Rowing Centre
- Date: 15–19 November 2010
- Competitors: 11 from 11 nations

Medalists
gold medal	Mohsen Shadi	Iran
silver medal	Daisaku Takeda	Japan
bronze medal	Artyom Kudryashov	Uzbekistan

The men's lightweight single sculls competition at the 2010 Asian Games in Guangzhou, China was held from 15 November to 19 November at the International Rowing Centre.

== Schedule ==
All times are China Standard Time (UTC+08:00)

Date	Time	Event
Monday, 15 November 2010	10:50	Heats
Wednesday, 17 November 2010	10:20	Repechages
Friday, 19 November 2010	10:50	Finals

== Results ==
Legend

- DNS — Did not start

=== Heats ===
- Qualification: 1 → Final A (FA), 2–6 → Repechages (R)

==== Heat 1 ====
Rank	Athlete	Time	Notes
1	Daisaku Takeda (JPN)	7:00.97	FA
2	Artyom Kudryashov (UZB)	7:13.62	R
3	Jang Kang-eun (KOR)	7:16.54	R
4	Yeong Wai Mun (SIN)	7:30.47	R
5	Vladislav Yakovlev (KAZ)	7:33.59	R
6	Sajeev De Silva (SRI)	7:40.71	R

==== Heat 2 ====
Rank	Athlete	Time	Notes
1	Mohsen Shadi (IRI)	7:01.35	FA
2	Lok Kwan Hoi (HKG)	7:15.33	R
3	Ruthtanaphol Theppibal (THA)	7:17.32	R
4	Benjamin Tolentino (PHI)	7:25.03	R
5	Fahad Al-Yaqout (IOC)	9:41.89	R

=== Repechages ===
- Qualification: 1–2 → Final A (FA), 3–5 → Final B (FB)

==== Repechage 1 ====
Rank	Athlete	Time	Notes
1	Ruthtanaphol Theppibal (THA)	7:18.62	FA
2	Artyom Kudryashov (UZB)	7:23.32	FA
3	Yeong Wai Mun (SIN)	7:33.63	FB
4	Sajeev De Silva (SRI)	7:47.66	FB
—	Fahad Al-Yaqout (IOC)	DNS	

==== Repechage 2 ====
Rank	Athlete	Time	Notes
1	Lok Kwan Hoi (HKG)	7:17.09	FA
2	Jang Kang-eun (KOR)	7:18.92	FA
3	Vladislav Yakovlev (KAZ)	7:20.82	FB
4	Benjamin Tolentino (PHI)	7:23.20	FB

=== Finals ===
==== Final B ====
Rank	Athlete	Time
1	Vladislav Yakovlev (KAZ)	7:16.48
2	Benjamin Tolentino (PHI)	7:16.55
3	Yeong Wai Mun (SIN)	7:29.12
4	Sajeev De Silva (SRI)	7:43.42

==== Final A ====
Rank	Athlete	Time
1st place, gold medalist(s)	Mohsen Shadi (IRI)	6:55.62
2nd place, silver medalist(s)	Daisaku Takeda (JPN)	7:00.43
3rd place, bronze medalist(s)	Artyom Kudryashov (UZB)	7:06.17
4	Lok Kwan Hoi (HKG)	7:07.44
5	Ruthtanaphol Theppibal (THA)	7:15.05
6	Jang Kang-eun (KOR)	7:17.17
