= Elaine Chan =

Hong Kong swimmer (born 1988)

Elaine Chan OLY
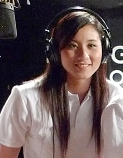
- Chan in 2009

Personal information
- Full name: Elaine Chan Yu-ning
- National team: Hong Kong
- Born: 15 March 1988 (age 38) Hong Kong, Hong Kong
- Height: 1.76 m (5 ft 9 in)
- Weight: 65 kg (143 lb)

Sport
- Sport: Swimming
- Strokes: Freestyle

Elaine Chan Yu-ning (Chinese: 陳宇寧; Jyutping: can^{4} jyu^{5} ning^{4}; born March 15, 1988) is a two-time Olympic swimmer from Hong Kong, specialized in freestyle events. At age sixteen, Chan first competed at the 2004 Summer Olympics in Athens, where she finished forty-seventh in the women's 50 m freestyle, with a time of 27.48 seconds. Following her remarkable performance at the Olympics, Chan granted a full scholarship to the Ohio State University in Columbus, Ohio, where she trained with the college swimming team for 18 months. In 2007, Chan returned to Hong Kong to pursue her education with a bachelor's degree in economics and finance at the University of Hong Kong, while she trained with the national team in preparation for the Olympics. She qualified for the 2008 Summer Olympics in Beijing, and competed for the second time in women's 50 m freestyle. She swam in the seventh heat of the competition, with a time of 26.54 seconds, bettering her personal best from the previous Olympics, but finishing only in forty-fourth place.
