= Jang Kang-eun =

South Korean rower (born 1988)

Personal information
- Nationality: South Korean
- Born: 4 December 1988 (age 36)

Sport
- Sport: Rowing

Jang Kang-eun (born 4 December 1988) is a South Korean rower. He competed in the men's lightweight double sculls event at the 2008 Summer Olympics.
