= Thiago Gomes (rower) =

Brazilian rower

Personal information
- Born: 11 January 1979 (age 47) Rio de Janeiro, Brazil

Sport
- Sport: Rowing
Medal record
Representing Brazil
Pan American Games
Silver medal – second place	2003 Santo Domingo	Lightweight double sculls

Thiago Gomes (born 11 January 1979) is a Brazilian rower. He competed at the 2004 Summer Olympics and the 2008 Summer Olympics.
