= Ruslan Naurzaliev =

Uzbekistani rower (born 1984)

Personal information
- Nationality: Uzbekistan
- Born: 21 December 1984 (age 41) Shirin, Uzbek SSR
- Height: 1.77 m (5 ft 9 1/2 in)
- Weight: 82 kg (181 lb)

Sport
- Sport: Rowing
- Club: Republican WSS
- Coached by: Zamir Baymuratov

Ruslan Naurzaliev (Uzbek: Руслан Наурзалиев; born December 21, 1984, in Shirin) is an Uzbekistani rower. He is also a member of Republican WSS Rowing Club, and is coached and trained by Zamir Baymuratov.

At age nineteen, Naurzaliev made his official debut for the 2004 Summer Olympics in Athens, where he and his partner Sergey Bogdanov finished fifth in the semi-final round of the men's lightweight double sculls, with a time of 6:45.47.

At the 2008 Summer Olympics in Beijing, Naurzaliev competed as the nation's lone rower in the men's single sculls, an event which was later dominated by defending Olympic champion Olaf Tufte of Norway. He came only in third place and twenty-sixth overall of this event by three seconds behind Iran's Mohsen Shadi, with a time of 7:06.54.
