= Mohsen Shadi =

Iranian rower (born 1988)

Personal information
- Born: 4 June 1988 (age 38) Naghadeh, Iran
Medal record
Representing Iran
Men's rowing
Asian Games
Gold medal – first place	2010 Guangzhou	LM1x
Gold medal – first place	2014 Incheon	M1x
Asian Championships
Gold medal – first place	2007 Chungju	LM1x
Gold medal – first place	2011 Hwacheon	M1x
Silver medal – second place	2013 Lu'an	M1x

Mohsen Shadi (Persian: محسن شادی نقده; born 17 June 1988, in Naghadeh) is an Iranian rower. He is the President of Islamic Republic of Iran Rowing Federation since December 2025.

== Competitive stats ==
=== Medals ===
- 2007 َAsian Championships (LM1x) Gold
- 2008 World U23 Championships (LM1x) – Silver
- 2009 World U23 Championships (LM1x) – Gold
- 2010 World U23 Championships (LM1x) – Gold
- 2010 Asian Games (LM1x) – Gold
- 2011 Asian Championships (M1x) – Gold
- 2013 Asian Championships (M1x) – Silver
- 2014 Asian Games (M1x) – Gold

=== Placing ===
- 2008 World Championships (LM1x) – 5th place
- 2008 Summer Olympics (M1x) – 25th place
- 2009 World Championships (LM1x) – 12th place
- 2011 World Championships (M1x) – 20th place
- 2012 Summer Olympics (M1x) – 22nd place
