= Argyris Theodoropoulos =

Greek water polo player

Personal information
- Born: 13 January 1981 (age 45) Athens, Greece

Sport
- Sport: Water polo
Medal record
Representing Greece
World Championships
Bronze medal – third place	2005 Montreal	Team competition

Argyris Theodoropoulos (born 13 January 1981) is a Greek water polo player who competed in the 2004 Summer Olympics, in the 2008 Summer Olympics and in the 2012 Summer Olympics.

== See also ==
- List of World Aquatics Championships medalists in water polo
