= Dimitrios Mouyios =

Greek rower (born 1981)

Dimitrios Mougios
Medal record

Men's rowing

Representing Greece

Olympic Games
Silver medal – second place	2008 Beijing	Lwt double scull

World Championships
Silver medal – second place	2007 Munich	Lwt double scull

European Championships
Gold medal – first place	2008 Marathon	Lwt double scull
Gold medal – first place	2009 Brest	Lwt double scull
Silver medal – second place	2007 Poznań	Lwt double scull

Dimitrios Mougios (Greek: Δημήτριος Μούγιος, born 13 October 1981 in Marousi, Athina) is a Greek rower.

== Career ==
Mougios won the silver medal in men's lightweight double sculls with Vasileios Polymeros at the 2008 Summer Olympics in Beijing, China.
