= Kim Hong-kyun (rower) =

South Korean rower

Personal information
- Nationality: South Korean
- Born: 30 April 1989 (age 35)

Sport
- Sport: Rowing

Kim Hong-kyun (born 30 April 1989) is a South Korean rower. He competed in the men's lightweight double sculls event at the 2008 Summer Olympics.
