= Angel García (rower) =

Uruguayan rower (born 1986)

Ángel Javier García
Personal information
- Full name: Ángel Javier García Correale
- Nationality: Uruguay
- Born: 26 March 1986 (age 40) Montevideo, Uruguay
- Height: 1.83 m (6 ft 0 in)
- Weight: 70 kg (154 lb)

Sport
- Sport: Rowing
- Event: Lightweight double sculls
- Club: Montevideo RC

Ángel Javier García Correale (born March 26, 1986) is a Uruguayan rower. He competed for the 2008 Summer Olympics in Beijing, where he and his partner Rodolfo Collazo finished third for the C-final, and fifteenth overall in the men's lightweight double sculls, with a time of 6:30.61.
