= Mohamed Ryad Garidi =

Algerian rower

Personal information
- Nationality: Algerian
- Born: 20 December 1977 (age 47); Algiers, Algeria

Sport
- Sport: Rowing

Mohamed Ryad Garidi (born 20 December 1977) is an Algerian rower. He competed in the men's lightweight double sculls event at the 2008 Summer Olympics.
