= Pratima Puhan =

Indian rower (born 1991)

Personal information
- Full name: Pratima Puhan
- Nationality: India
- Born: 27 August 1991 (age 34) Cuttack, Odisha, India

Sport
- Country: India
- Sport: Rowing
Medal record
Women's rowing
Representing India
Asian Games
Bronze medal – third place	2010 Guangzhou	Coxless pair

Pratima Puhan (born 27 August 1991 in Cuttack, Odisha) is an Indian rower. She won a bronze medal in Women coxless pair event with Pramila Prava Minz of Odisha in the 2010 Asian Games.

== Achievements ==
- Wrote rowing history for India by becoming the first Indian women along with Pramila Prava Minz to win a medal in 2010 Asian Games.
- She and Pramila Prava Minz claimed a bronze in the coxless pair event, clocking seven minutes and 47.50 seconds at Guangzhou, China on 19 November 2010.
