= Maxime Goisset =

French rower (born 1985)

Medal record

Men's rowing

Representing France

World Rowing Championships
Silver medal – second place	2007 Munich	LM4x
Bronze medal – third place	2006 Eton	LM4x

Maxime Goisset (born 4 April 1985 in Chenôve) is a French rower.
