= Vasileios Polymeros =

Greek rower (born 1976)

Personal information
- Born: 20 February 1976 (age 50) Volos, Greece
Medal record
Men's rowing
Representing Greece
Olympic Games
Silver medal – second place	2008 Beijing	Lwt double scull
Bronze medal – third place	2004 Athens	Lwt double scull
World Championships
Gold medal – first place	2005 Gifu	Lwt single scull
Silver medal – second place	2001 Lucerne	Lwt quad scull
Silver medal – second place	2007 Munich	Lwt double scull
Silver medal – second place	2009 Poznan	Lwt single scull
European Championships
Gold medal – first place	2008 Marathon	Lwt double scull
Gold medal – first place	2009 Brest	Lwt double scull
Silver medal – second place	2007 Poznań	Lwt double scull
Mediterranean Games
Gold medal – first place	2005 Almería	Lwt double scull
Gold medal – first place	2009 Pescara	Single scull

Vasileios Polymeros (Greek: Βασίλειος Πολύμερος, born 20 February 1976 in Volos) is a Greek rower. He won the bronze medal in men's lightweight double sculls with Nikolaos Skiathitis at the 2004 Summer Olympics in Athens, Greece and the silver in men's lightweight double sculls with Dimitrios Mougios at the 2008 Summer Olympics in Beijing, China.
