= Pramila Prava Minz =

Indian rower

Personal information
- Full name: Pramila Prava Minz
- Nationality: India
- Born: Odisha, India

Sport
- Country: India
- Sport: Rowing
Medal record
Women's rowing
Representing India
Asian Games
Bronze medal – third place	2010 Guangzhou	Coxless pair

Pramila Prava Minz is an Indian rower from Odisha. She won a bronze medal in Women coxless pair event with Pratima Puhan of Odisha in the 2010 Asian Games.

== Achievements ==
- Wrote rowing history for India by becoming the first woman of the country along with Pratima Puhan to win a medal in 2010 Asian Games.
- She and Pratima Puhan claimed a bronze in the coxless pair event, clocking seven minutes and 47.50 seconds at Guangzhou, China on 19 November 2010.
