= Sandeep Kumar (rower) =

Indian rower

Personal information
- Full name: Sandeep Kumar
- Nationality: Indian
- Born: 12 August 1988 (age 37)
- Height: 5 ft 0 in (152 cm)
- Weight: 55 kg (121 lb)

Sport
- Country: India
- Coached by: Ismail Baig
Medal record
Representing India
- Updated on 10 July 2013

Sandeep Kumar (born 12 August 1988) represented India in the Men's Lightweight Double Sculls at the 2012 London Olympics with teammate Manjeet Singh.
