= Thiago Almeida (rower) =

Brazilian rower

Personal information
- Born: 14 January 1980 (age 46) Cariacica, Brazil

Sport
- Sport: Rowing

Thiago Almeida (born 14 January 1980) is a Brazilian rower. He competed in the men's lightweight double sculls event at the 2008 Summer Olympics.
