= Kamel Ait Daoud =

Algerian rower (born 1985)

Personal information
- Nationality: Algerian
- Born: 18 May 1985 (age 41)

Sport
- Sport: Rowing

Kamel Ait Daoud (born 18 May 1985) is an Algerian rower. He competed in the men's lightweight double sculls event at the 2008 Summer Olympics. He represented Algeria at the 2020 Summer Olympics in the Men's Lightweight Double Sculls with partner Sid Ali Boudina. They finished in 17th place.
