= Nuno Mendes (rower) =

Portuguese rower

Medal record

Representing Portugal

Men's rowing

European Championships
Silver medal – second place	2010 Montemor-o-Velho	LM2x
Bronze medal – third place	2011 Plovdiv	LM2x
Silver medal – second place	2012 Varese	LM2x

Nuno Mendes (born 10 May 1984 in Porto) is a Portuguese rower. He started competitive rowing in 1994 and currently represents Sporting Clube de Portugal. Competing in the lightweight double sculls category (LM2x) with Pedro Fraga, he finished in 5th place at the 2012 Summer Olympics in London and won two silver medals at the 2010 and 2012 European Rowing Championships.
