= Devender Kumar Khandwal =

Indian rower (born 1986)

Personal information
- Born: 10 July 1986 (age 39) Garhi, Banswara, India
- Height: 1.80 m (5 ft 11 in)
- Weight: 70 kg (154 lb)

Sport
- Sport: Rowing
- Event: Lightweight double sculls

Devender Kumar Khandwal (born 10 July 1986) is an Indian rower. Khandwal competed for the 2008 Summer Olympics in Beijing, where he and his partner Manjeet Singh finished last for the C-final, and eighteenth overall in the men's lightweight double sculls, with a time of 6:44.48.
