= Elia Luini =

Italian rower

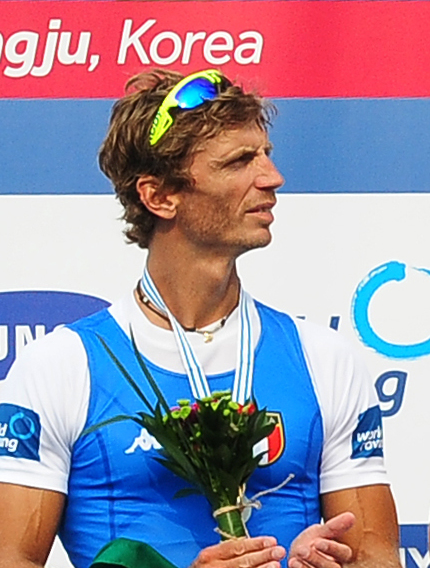
- Luini in 2013

Personal information
- Nationality: Italian
- Born: 1 June 1979 (age 47) Gavirate, Italy
Medal record
Men's rowing
Representing Italy
Olympic Games
Silver medal – second place	2000 Sydney	LM2x
World Championships
Gold medal – first place	1998 Cologne	LM4x
Gold medal – first place	2001 Lucerne	LM2x
Gold medal – first place	2002 Seville	LM2x
Gold medal – first place	2003 Milan	LM2x
Silver medal – second place	2006 Eton	LM2x
Silver medal – second place	2010 Karapiro	LM2x
Silver medal – second place	2013 Chungju	LM2−
Bronze medal – third place	2005 Gifu	LM4-
Bronze medal – third place	2009 Poznań	LM2x
Bronze medal – third place	2011 Bled	LM2x

Elia Luini (born 23 June 1979) is an Italian rower. A four-time world champion, once in the lightweight quadruple sculls and three times in the lightweight double sculls, he has also competed at four Olympic Games (2000, 2004, 2008 and 2012), winning the silver medal in the men's lightweight double sculls at the Sydney Olympics with Leonardo Pettinari.
