= Sun Jie (rower) =

Chinese rower

Sun Jie (Chinese: 孙杰; pinyin: Sūn Jié, born 13 June 1988 in Fuyang, Hangzhou, Zhejiang) is a male Chinese rower, who competed for Team China at the 2008 Summer Olympics and the 2012 Summer Olympics. He competed in the men's lightweight sculls at both Olympics. His teammate in 2008 was Zhang Guolin, and they finished in 5th place. In 2012 his teammate was Zhang Fangbing, they finished in 15th place.

Since 2005, he has competed in world rowing events. Although, he primarily competes in Lightweight Men's Double Sculls, he competed in the Chinese men's lightweight eight at the 2010 World Championships.

== Major performances ==
- 2006 National Spring Champions Tournament – 1st LM1X;
- 2006 National Championships – 1st LM1X;
- 2007 World Cup, Netherlands – 7th LM2X;
- 2007 World Championships – 9th LM2X;
- 2008 World Cup, Munich – 4th LM2X;
- 2008 Olympics, Beijing - 5th LM2X;
- 2012 Olympics, Great Britain - 15th LM2X
