= Hideki Omoto =

Japanese rower (born 1984)

Personal information
- Born: 12 August 1984 (age 41)
- Height: 179 cm (5 ft 10 in)
- Weight: 70 kg (154 lb)

Sport
- Country: Japan
- Sport: Rowing

Hideki Omoto (大元 英照, Ōmoto Hideki; born 12 August 1984) is a Japanese rower from Miyagi Prefecture. He competed in the men's lightweight double sculls event at the 2016 Summer Olympics.
