= Zhang Guolin =

Chinese Olympic rower

Zhang Guolin (simplified Chinese: 张国林; traditional Chinese: 張國林; pinyin: Zhāng Guólín, born 14 March 1985 in Zhuanghe, Dalian, Liaoning) is a male Chinese rower, who competed for Team China at the 2008 Summer Olympics (in the men's lightweight double sculls) and 2012 Summer Olympics (in the men's lightweight four).

In the 2008 Summer Olympics, he came 5th place, making him the best-performing contestant from Asia.

== Major performances ==
- 2003 World U23 Championships – 2nd LM2X
- 2006 National Championships – 2nd lightweight fours
- 2007 National Water Sports Games – 1st LM2X
- 2008 World Cup Munich – 4th LM2X
- 2008 Olympic Games – 5th LM2X
- 2009 National Games – 2nd LM4-
- 2010 Asian Games – 1st LM2X
- 2011 World Rowing Championships – 4th LM4X
- 2012 World Cup – 1st
