= So Sau Wah =

Hong Kong rower (born 1985)

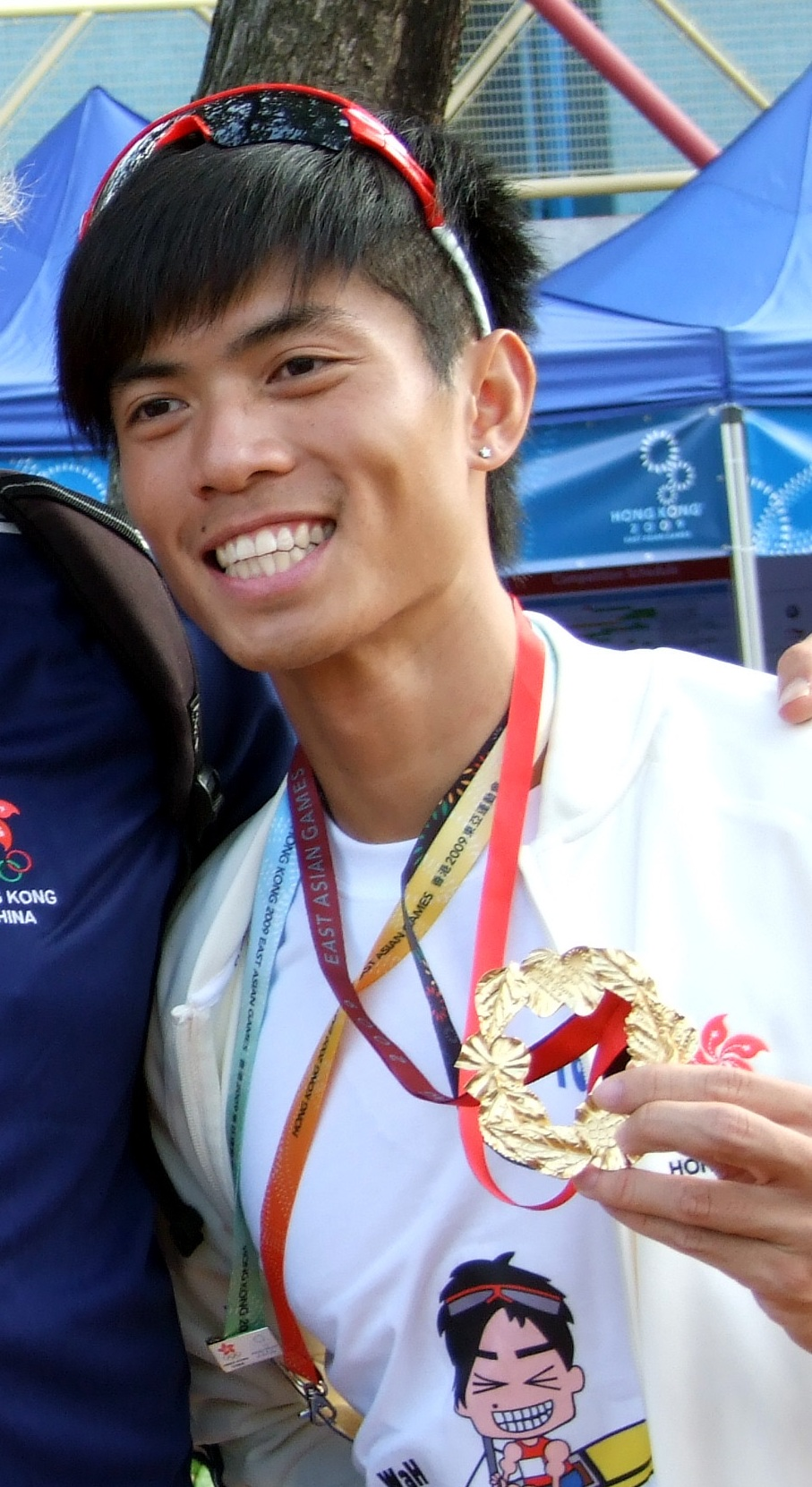
- So Sau Wah in 2009

Personal information
- Nationality: Hong Konger
- Born: 26 August 1985 (age 39); Hong Kong

Sport
- Sport: Rowing

So Sau Wah (born 26 August 1985) is a Hong Kong rower. He competed at the 2004 Summer Olympics, 2008 Summer Olympics and the 2012 Summer Olympics.
