= Chow Kwong Wing =

Hong Kong rower (born 1986)

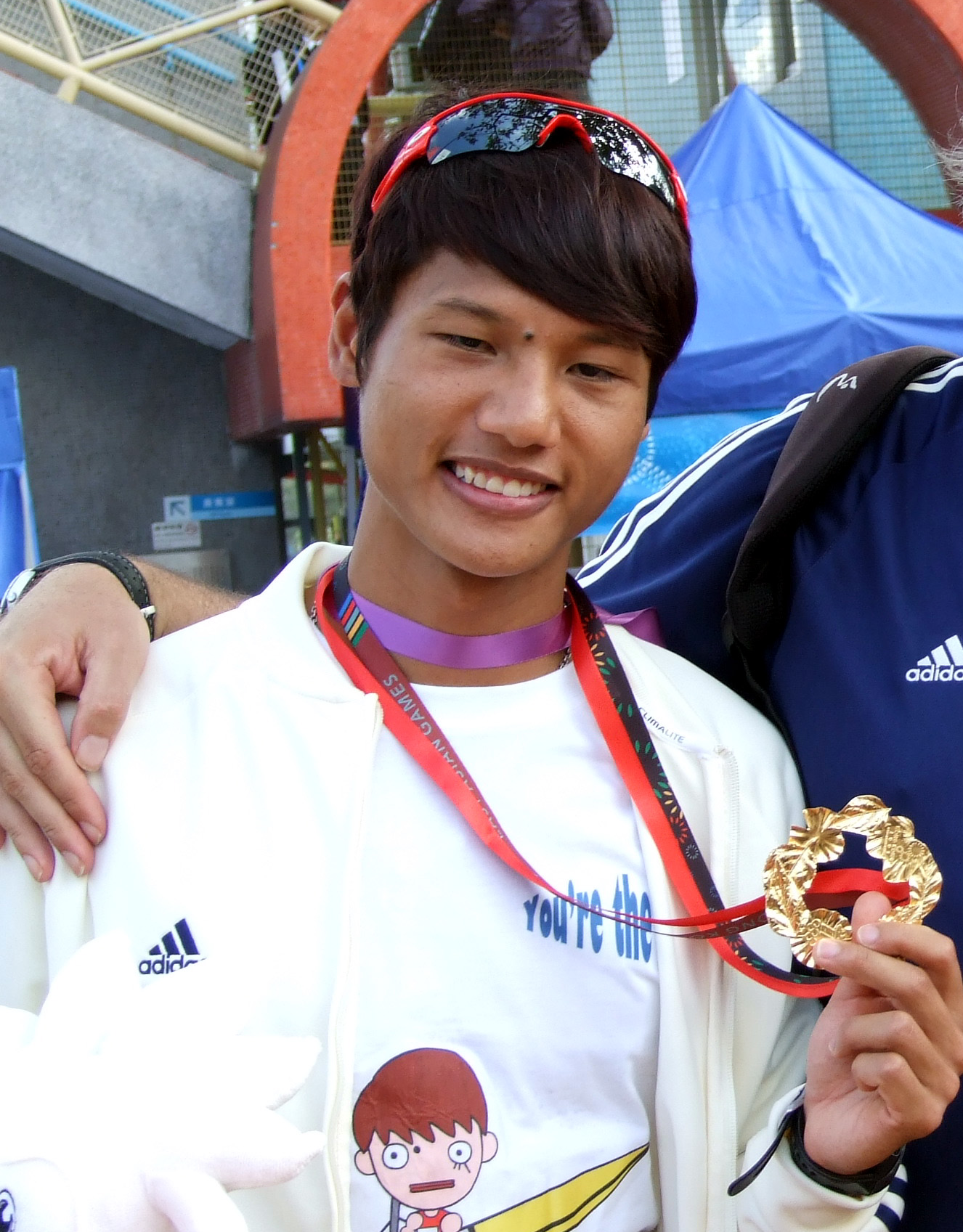
- Chow Kwong Wing in 2009

Personal information
- Nationality: Hong Konger
- Born: 17 March 1986 (age 39); Hong Kong

Sport
- Sport: Rowing

Chow Kwong Wing (born 17 March 1986) is a Hong Kong rower. He competed in the men's lightweight double sculls event at the 2008 Summer Olympics.
