= Manjeet Singh (rower) =

Indian rower (born 1988)

Personal information
- Nationality: Indian
- Born: 10 October 1988 (age 37)
- Height: 5 ft 10 in (1.78 m)
- Weight: 75 kg (165 lb)

Sport
- Country: India
- Sport: Rowing
- Coached by: Ismail Baig, Bajrang Lal
Medal record
Representing India
Asian Games
Silver medal – second place	2010 Guangzhou	Eight
Silver medal – second place	2010 Guangzhou	Lightweight coxless four
- Updated on 10 August 2012

Manjeet Singh (born 10 October 1988) represented India the Men's Lightweight Double Sculls at the 2008 and 2012 London Olympics. In 2008, his teammate was Devender Khandwal and in 2012, it was Sandeep Kumar.
