= Rowing at the 2010 South American Games – Men's lightweight double sculls =

The Men's lightweight double sculls event at the 2010 South American Games was held over March 19–20. The qualification round and the repechage were held on the first day, beginning at 9:30 and the final was held on the following day at 9:20.

== Medalists ==
Gold	Silver	Bronze
Rodolfo Collazo; Emiliano Dumestre; Uruguay	Cesar Amarais; Jose Guipe; Venezuela	Abraham Esteban Carvajal; Francisco Gavilan; Chile

== Records ==
World Best Time
World best time	Denmark	6:10.02	Amsterdam, Netherlands	2010

== Results ==
=== Heats ===
==== Heat 1 ====
Rank	Rowers	Country	Time	Notes
1	Agustin Campassi, Miguel Mayol	Argentina	6:43.33	FA
2	Ronaldo Vargas, Roque Zimmermann	Brazil	6:54.25	R
3	Cesar Amarais, Jose Guipe	Venezuela	7:04.11	R
4	Juan Jose Crovato, Reynaldo Bertoni	Paraguay	7:11.02	R

==== Heat 2 ====
Rank	Rowers	Country	Time	Notes
1	Rodolfo Collazo, Emiliano Dumestre	Uruguay	6:38.19	FA
2	Abraham Esteban Carvajal, Francisco Gavilan	Chile	6:49.04	R
3	Rodrigo Forero, Andres Felipe Espinar	Colombia	7:03.60	R
4	Julio Cesar Sanchez, Jhon Fabricio Salavarria	Ecuador	7:05.88	R

=== Repechage ===
Rank	Rowers	Country	Time	Notes
1	Juan Jose Crovato, Reynaldo Bertoni	Paraguay	6:42.98	FA
2	Ronaldo Vargas, Roque Zimmermann	Brazil	6:43.47	FA
3	Abraham Esteban Carvajal, Francisco Gavilan	Chile	6:45.25	FA
4	Cesar Amarais, Jose Guipe	Venezuela	6:48.81	FA
5	Rodrigo Forero, Andres Felipe Espinar	Colombia	6:54.26	FB
6	Julio Cesar Sanchez, Jhon Fabricio Salavarria	Ecuador	7:05.86	FB

=== Final ===
Rank	Rowers	Country	Time
1st place, gold medalist(s)	Rodolfo Collazo, Emiliano Dumestre	Uruguay	7:36.37
2nd place, silver medalist(s)	Cesar Amarais, Jose Guipe	Venezuela	7:40.95
3rd place, bronze medalist(s)	Abraham Esteban Carvajal, Francisco Gavilan	Chile	7:44.00
4	Agustin Campassi, Miguel Mayol	Argentina	7:47.93
5	Juan Jose Crovato, Reynaldo Bertoni	Paraguay	7:50.67
6	Ronaldo Vargas, Roque Zimmermann	Brazil	8:09.34
