= Rowing at the 2010 South American Games =

- Dates: March 20–22

There were 14 rowing events at the 2010 South American Games: 6 women's events and 8 men's events. The events were held over March 20–22.

== Medal summary ==
=== Medal table ===
| Rank | Nation | Gold | Silver | Bronze | Total |
|---|---|---|---|---|---|
| 1 | Argentina (ARG) | 10 | 2 | 0 | 12 |
| 2 | Brazil (BRA) | 2 | 3 | 5 | 10 |
| 3 | Uruguay (URU) | 1 | 3 | 0 | 4 |
| 4 | Chile (CHI) | 1 | 2 | 3 | 6 |
| 5 | Venezuela (VEN) | 0 | 2 | 2 | 4 |
| 6 | Colombia (COL) | 0 | 1 | 0 | 1 |
| 6 | Paraguay (PAR) | 0 | 1 | 0 | 1 |
| 8 | Peru (PER) | 0 | 0 | 1 | 1 |
| Totals (8 entries) | | 14 | 14 | 11 | 39 |

=== Medalists ===
| Event | Gold | Silver | Bronze |
|---|---|---|---|
Men's events
| Men's single sculls | Cristian Rosso; Argentina | Jhonatan Esquivel; Uruguay | Ailson Silva; Brazil |
| Men's double sculls | Santiago Fernández; Sebastián Fernández; Argentina | Jhonatan Esquivel; Santiago Menese; Uruguay | Thiago Almeida; Thiago Carvalho; Brazil |
| Men's quadruple sculls | Alejandro Cucchietti; Santiago Fernández; Sebastián Fernández; Cristian Rosso; Argentina | Rodolfo Collazo; Emiliano Dumestre; Jhonatan Esquivel; Santiago Menese; Uruguay | no medal |
| Men's lightweight single sculls | Ailson Silva; Brazil | Rodrigo Forero; Colombia | Jackson Vincent; Venezuela |
| Men's lightweight double sculls | Rodolfo Collazo; Emiliano Dumestre; Uruguay | Cesar Amarais; Jose Guipe; Venezuela | Abraham Esteban Carvajal; Francisco Gavilan; Chile |
| Men's lightweight quadruple sculls | Agustin Campassi; Miguel Mayol; Matias Molina; Felipe Taglianut; Argentina | Jose Guipe; Cesar Amarais; Ali Leiva; Jackson Vincent; Venezuela | Lorenzo Sandoval; Bernardo Diaz; Claudio Saavedra; Felipe Parra; Chile |
| Men's lightweight pair | Miguel Angel Silva; Fabian Zbinden; Chile | Carlo Lauro; Pablo Manhic; Argentina | Alisson Araujo; Ronald Brito; Brazil |
| Men's lightweight four | Mario Cejas; Nicolai Fernandez; Carlo Lauro; Pablo Manhic; Argentina | Miguel Angel Silva; Rodrigo Santibanez; Felipe Zbinden; Fabian Zbinden; Chile | no medal |
Women's events
| Women's singles sculls | Gabriela Best; Argentina | Soraya Iffat Arriaza; Chile | Kissya Costa; Brazil |
| Women's double sculls | Fabiana Beltrame; Carolina Rocha; Brazil | Laura Abalo; Lucia Palermo; Argentina | Maria Jose Montoya; Natalia Camila Sanchez; Peru |
| Women's quadruple sculls | Laura Abalo; Lucia Palermo; Clara Rohner; Anabela Torres; Argentina | Fabiana Beltrame; Camila Carvalho; Kissya Costa; Carolina Rocha; Brazil | Daniela Johana Hernandez; Soraya Arriaza; Florencia Piederit; Pamela Olave; Chile |
| Women's lightweight single sculls | Milka Kraljev; Argentina | Gabriela Mosqueira; Paraguay | Luciana Granato; Brazil |
| Women's lightweight double sculls | Milka Kraljev; Clara Rohner; Argentina | Camila Carvalho; Luciana Granato; Brazil | Joselin Izaze; Kimberlin Meneses; Venezuela |
| Women's pair | Laura Abalo; Gabriela Best; Argentina | Fabiana Beltrame; Kissya Costa; Brazil | no medal |
