= Rowing at the 2011 Pan American Games – Men's lightweight double sculls =

Rowing – Men's l.weight double sculls at the 2011 Pan American Games
- Venue: Canoe & Rowing Course
- Dates: October 15 - October 18
- Competitors: 22 from 11 nations

Medalists
| Gold medal | Alan Armenta; Gerardo Sanchez | Mexico |
| Silver medal | Yunior Perez; Eyder Batista | Cuba |
| Bronze medal | Travis King; Terence McKall | Canada |

The men's lightweight double sculls rowing event at the 2011 Pan American Games was held from October 15–18 at the Canoe & Rowing Course in Ciudad Guzman. The defending Pan American Games champion is Horacio Sicilia & Maximiliano Martínez of Argentina.

== Schedule ==
All times are Central Standard Time (UTC-6).

| Date | Time | Round |
|---|---|---|
| October 15, 2011 | 10:10 | Heats |
| October 15, 2011 | 16:20 | Repechages |
| October 18, 2011 | 9:00 | Final B |
| October 18, 2011 | 9:08 | Final A |

== Results ==
=== Heats ===
==== Heat 1 ====
| Rank | Rowers | Country | Time | Notes |
|---|---|---|---|---|
| 1 | Alan Armenta, Gerardo Sanchez | Mexico | 6:34.20 | FA |
| 2 | Robert Duff, Tom Paradiso | United States | 6:45.14 | R |
| 3 | Yunior Perez, Eyder Batista | Cuba | 6:47.44 | R |
| 4 | Rodolfo Collazo, Emiliano Dumestre | Uruguay | 6:50.29 | R |
| 5 | Juan Alavarez, Francisco Chacon | El Salvador | 7:08.12 | R |
| 6 | Marco Azurmendi, Cristian Yantani | Chile | 7:17.65 | R |

==== Heat 2 ====
| Rank | Rowers | Country | Time | Notes |
|---|---|---|---|---|
| 1 | Travis King, Terence McKall | Canada | 6:33.82 | FA |
| 2 | Ronaldo Vargas, Thiago Gomes | Brazil | 6:34.16 | R |
| 3 | Mario Cejas, Miguel Mayol | Argentina | 6:56.42 | R |
| 4 | Niko Kissic, Renzo Leon | Peru | 7:01.12 | R |
| 5 | Wilton Tatum, Luis Aguilar | Honduras | 7:38.01 | R |

=== Repechages ===
==== Repechage 1 ====
| Rank | Rowers | Country | Time | Notes |
|---|---|---|---|---|
| 1 | Robert Duff, Tom Paradiso | United States | 6:44.44 | FA |
| 2 | Mario Cejas, Miguel Mayol | Argentina | 6:46.87 | FA |
| 3 | Rodolfo Collazo, Emiliano Dumestre | Uruguay | 6:51.25 | FB |
| 4 | Marco Azurmendi, Cristian Yantani | Chile | 7:06.29 | FB |
| 5 | Wilton Tatum, Luis Aguilar | Honduras | 7:48.91 | FB |

==== Repechage 2 ====
| Rank | Rowers | Country | Time | Notes |
|---|---|---|---|---|
| 1 | Yunior Perez, Eyder Batista | Cuba | 6:48.25 | FA |
| 2 | Ronaldo Vargas, Thiago Gomes | Brazil | 6:48.64 | FA |
| 3 | Niko Kissic, Renzo Leon | Peru | 6:51.05 | FB |
| 4 | Juan Alavarez, Francisco Chacon | El Salvador | 6:53.80 | FB |

=== Final B ===
| Rank | Rowers | Country | Time | Notes |
|---|---|---|---|---|
| 7 | Rodolfo Collazo, Emiliano Dumestre | Uruguay | 6:44.89 | |
| 8 | Niko Kissic, Renzo Leon | Peru | 6:47.82 | |
| 9 | Juan Alavarez, Francisco Chacon | El Salvador | 6:49.47 | |
| 10 | Marco Azurmendi, Cristian Yantani | Chile | 6:54.37 | |
| 11 | Wilton Tatum, Luis Aguilar | Honduras | | DNS |

=== Final A ===
| Rank | Rowers | Country | Time | Notes |
|---|---|---|---|---|
| 1st place, gold medalist(s) | Alan Armenta, Gerardo Sanchez | Mexico | 6:24.52 | |
| 2nd place, silver medalist(s) | Yunior Perez, Eyder Batista | Cuba | 6:27.07 | |
| 3rd place, bronze medalist(s) | Travis King, Terence McKall | Canada | 6:29.27 | |
| 4 | Robert Duff, Tom Paradiso | United States | 6:30.85 | |
| 5 | Ronaldo Vargas, Thiago Gomes | Brazil | 6:35.60 | |
| 6 | Mario Cejas, Miguel Mayol | Argentina | 6:36.79 | |
