= Rowing at the 2010 South American Games – Men's lightweight quadruple sculls =

The Men's lightweight quadruple sculls event at the 2010 South American Games was held over March 22 at 9:20.

== Medalists ==
Gold	Silver	Bronze
Agustin Campassi; Miguel Mayol; Matias Molina; Felipe Taglianut; Argentina	Jose Guipe; Cesar Amarais; Ali Leiva; Jackson Vincent; Venezuela	Lorenzo Sandoval; Bernardo Diaz; Claudio Saavedra; Felipe Parra; Chile

== Records ==
World Best Time
World best time	Italy	5:45.18	Montreal, Canada	1992

== Results ==
Rank	Rowers	Country	Time
1st place, gold medalist(s)	Agustin Campassi, Miguel Mayol, Matias Molina, Felipe Taglianut	Argentina	6:15.64
2nd place, silver medalist(s)	Jose Guipe, Cesar Amarais, Ali Leiva, Jackson Vincent	Venezuela	6:15.75
3rd place, bronze medalist(s)	Lorenzo Sandoval, Bernardo Diaz, Claudio Saavedra, Felipe Parra	Chile	6:17.03
4	Thiago Almeida, Thiago Carvalho, Ronaldo Vargas, Roque Zimmermann	Brazil	6:19.67
5	Pablo ANchieri, Rodolfo Collazo, Emiliano Dumestre, Diego Perini	Uruguay	6:20.73
4	Manuel Bustinza, Renzo Garcia, Diego Petersen, Mateo Scheuch	Peru	6:33.03
