= Rowing at the 2012 Summer Olympics – Men's lightweight double sculls =

Men's lightweight double sculls at the Games of the XXX Olympiad
- Venue: Eton Dorney
- Date: 29 July – 4 August 2012
- Competitors: 40 from 20 nations
- Winning time: 6:37.17

Medalists
1st place, gold medalist(s)		Mads Rasmussen; Rasmus Quist Hansen	Denmark
2nd place, silver medalist(s)		Zac Purchase; Mark Hunter	Great Britain
3rd place, bronze medalist(s)		Storm Uru; Peter Taylor	New Zealand

The Men's lightweight double sculls competition at the 2012 Summer Olympics in London took place are at Dorney Lake which, for the purposes of the Games venue, is officially termed Eton Dorney.

== Schedule ==
All times are British Summer Time (UTC+1)

Date	Time	Round
Sunday, 29 July 2012	11:10	Heats
Tuesday, 31 July 2012	10:30	Repechages
Wednesday, 1 August 2012	09:50	Semifinals C/D
Thursday, 2 August 2012	10:50	Semifinals
Saturday, 4 August 2012	09:40	Final D
Saturday, 4 August 2012	10:10	Final C
Saturday, 4 August 2012	10:50	Final B
Saturday, 4 August 2012	12:10	Final

== Results ==
=== Heats ===
First two of each heat qualify to the semifinals, remainder goes to the repechage.

==== Heat 1 ====
Rank	Rowers	Country	Time	Notes
1	Pietro Ruta; Elia Luini	Italy	6:35.72	Q
2	Pedro Fraga; Nuno Mendes	Portugal	6:37.91	Q
3	Douglas Vandor; Morgan Jarvis	Canada	6:42.59	R
4	Sandeep Kumar; Manjeet Singh	India	6:56.60	R
5	Mohamed Nofel; Omar Al-Sabahi	Egypt	6:59.57	R

==== Heat 2 ====
Rank	Rowers	Country	Time	Notes
1	Zac Purchase; Mark Hunter	Great Britain	6:36.29	Q
2	Storm Uru; Peter Taylor	New Zealand	6:37.02	Q
3	Roderick Chisholm; Thomas Gibson	Australia	6:47.33	R
4	Zhang Fangbing; Sun Jie	China	6:57.67	R
5	Mario Cejas; Miguel Mayol	Argentina	7:01.76	R

==== Heat 3 ====
Rank	Rowers	Country	Time	Notes
1	Mads Rasmussen; Rasmus Quist Hansen	Denmark	6:33.11	Q
2	Kristoffer Brun; Are Strandli	Norway	6:34.00	Q
3	Manuel Suárez; Yunior Perez	Cuba	6:36.31	R
4	Zsolt Hirling; Tamás Varga	Hungary	6:36.90	R
5	Eleftherios Konsolas; Panagiotis Magdanis	Greece	6:42.13	R

==== Heat 4 ====
Rank	Rowers	Country	Time	Notes
1	Stany Delayre; Jérémie Azou	France	6:40.89	Q
2	Linus Lichtschlag; Lars Hartig	Germany	6:49.44	Q
3	Kazushige Ura; Daisaku Takeda	Japan	6:54.01	R
4	Rodolfo Collazo; Emiliano Dumestre	Uruguay	6:58.63	R
5	Leung Chun Shek; Lok Kwan Hoi	Hong Kong	6:59.52	R

=== Repechage ===
First two qualify to the semifinals.

==== Repechage 1 ====
Rank	Rower	Country	Time	Notes
1	Eleftherios Konsolas; Panagiotis Magdanis	Greece	6:31.13	Q
2	Zsolt Hirling; Tamás Varga	Hungary	6:32.31	Q
3	Roderick Chisholm; Thomas Gibson	Australia	6:34.29	
4	Douglas Vandor; Morgan Jarvis	Canada	6:36.03	
5	Rodolfo Collazo; Emiliano Dumestre	Uruguay	6:51.67	
6	Mohamed Nofel; Omar Emira	Egypt	6:57.06	

==== Repechage 2 ====
Rank	Rower	Country	Time	Notes
1	Manuel Suarez Barrios; Yunior Perez	Cuba	6:37.04	Q
2	Kazushige Ura; Daisaku Takeda	Japan	6:39.81	Q
3	Zhang Fangbing; Sun Jie	China	6:40.12	
4	Leung Chun Shek; Lok Kwan Hoi	Hong Kong	6:47.04	
5	Mario Cejas; Miguel Mayol	Argentina	6:48.21	
6	Sandeep Kumar; Manjeet Singh	India	6:54.20	

=== Semifinals ===
==== Semifinals C/D ====
First three qualify to Final C, remainder to Final D.

===== Semifinal 1 =====
Rank	Rowers	Country	Time	Notes
1	Roderick Chisholm; Thomas Gibson	Australia	7:06.24	Q
2	Mario Cejas; Miguel Mayol	Argentina	7:06.24	Q
3	Leung Chun Shek; Lok Kwan Hoi	Hong Kong	7:13.67	Q
4	Mohamed Nofel; Omar Emira	Egypt	7:19.29	

===== Semifinal 2 =====
Rank	Rowers	Country	Time	Notes
1	Douglas Vandor; Morgan Jarvis	Canada	7:02.85	Q
2	Zhang Fangbing; Sun Jie	China	7:09.39	Q
3	Rodolfo Collazo; Emiliano Dumestre	Uruguay	7:11.20	Q
4	Sandeep Kumar; Manjeet Singh	India	7:19.31	

==== Semifinals A/B ====
First three qualify to Final A, remainder to Final B.

===== Semifinal 1 =====
Rank	Rowers	Country	Time	Notes
1	Mads Rasmussen; Rasmus Quist Hansen	Denmark	6:33.25	Q
2	Storm Uru; Peter Taylor	New Zealand	6:36.71	Q
3	Linus Lichtschlag; Lars Hartig	Germany	6:37.44	Q
4	Eleftherios Konsolas; Panagiotis Magdanis	Greece	6:40.89	
5	Pietro Ruta; Elia Luini	Italy	6:41.17	
6	Kazushige Ura; Daisaku Takeda	Japan	6:48.61	

===== Semifinal 2 =====
Rank	Rowers	Country	Time	Notes
1	Zac Purchase; Mark Hunter	Great Britain	6:36.62	Q
2	Stany Delayre; Jérémie Azou	France	6:37.29	Q
3	Pedro Fraga; Nuno Mendes	Portugal	6:37.99	Q
4	Kristoffer Brun; Are Strandli	Norway	6:39.59	
5	Zsolt Hirling; Tamás Varga	Hungary	6:42.81	
6	Manuel Suarez Barrios; Yunior Perez	Cuba	6:52.26	

=== Finals ===
==== Final D ====
Rank	Rowers	Country	Time	Notes
1	Sandeep Kumar; Manjeet Singh	India	7:08.39	
2	Mohamed Nofel; Omar Emira	Egypt	7:12.79	

==== Final C ====
Rank	Rowers	Country	Time	Notes
1	Roderick Chisholm; Thomas Gibson	Australia	6:44.40	
2	Douglas Vandor; Morgan Jarvis	Canada	6:46.62	
3	Zhang Fangbing; Sun Jie	China	6:49.39	
4	Rodolfo Collazo; Emiliano Dumestre	Uruguay	6:51.94	
5	Mario Cejas; Miguel Mayol	Argentina	6:53.71	
6	Leung Chun Shek; Lok Kwan Hoi	Hong Kong	7:00.01	

==== Final B ====
Rank	Rowers	Country	Time	Notes
1	Pietro Ruta; Elia Luini	Italy	6:29.92	
2	Eleftherios Konsolas; Panagiotis Magdanis	Greece	6:31.71	
3	Kristoffer Brun; Are Strandli	Norway	6:32.82	
4	Manuel Suarez Barrios; Yunior Perez	Cuba	6:34.96	
5	Zsolt Hirling; Tamas Varga	Hungary	6:39.98	
6	Kazushige Ura; Daisaku Takeda	Japan	6:48.27	

==== Final A ====
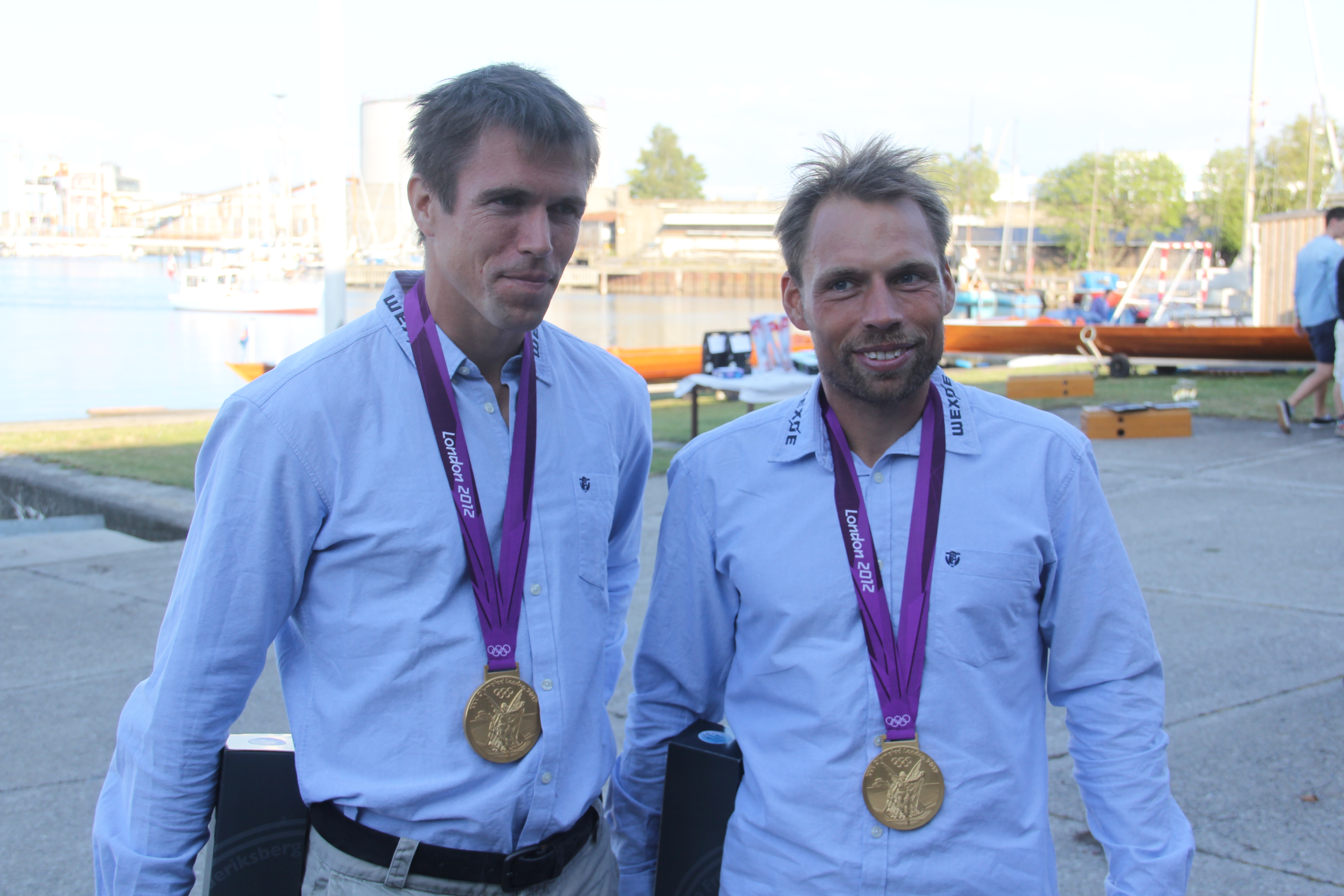
Winners Rasmussen and Quist

Rank	Rowers	Country	Time	Notes
1st place, gold medalist(s)	Mads Rasmussen; Rasmus Quist Hansen	Denmark	6:37.17	
2nd place, silver medalist(s)	Zac Purchase; Mark Hunter	Great Britain	6:37.78	
3rd place, bronze medalist(s)	Storm Uru; Peter Taylor	New Zealand	6:40.86	
4	Stany Delayre; Jérémie Azou	France	6:42.69	
5	Pedro Fraga; Nuno Mendes	Portugal	6:44.80	
6	Linus Lichtschlag; Lars Hartig	Germany	6:49.07	
