= Rowing at the 2010 South American Games – Men's quadruple sculls =

Rowing event

The Men's quadruple sculls event at the 2010 South American Games was held over March 22 at 11:00.

== Medalists ==
Gold	Silver	Bronze
Alejandro Cucchietti; Santiago Fernandez; Sebastian Fernandez; Cristian Rosso; Argentina	Rodolfo Collazo; Emiliano Dumestre; Jhonatan Esquivel; Santiago Menese; Uruguay	no medal

== Records ==
World Best Time
World best time	Australia	5:36.20	Beijing, China	2008

== Results ==
Rank	Rowers	Country	Time
1st place, gold medalist(s)	Alejandro Cucchietti, Santiago Fernandez, Sebastian Fernandez, Cristian Rosso	Argentina	6:05.68
2nd place, silver medalist(s)	Rodolfo Collazo, Emiliano Dumestre, Jhonatan Esquivel, Santiago Menese	Uruguay	6:14.48
3	Ailson Silva, Roque Zimmermann, Ronaldo Vargas, Thiago Carvalho	Brazil	6:29.34
