= Uruguay at the 2012 Summer Olympics =

- IOC code: URU
- NOC: Uruguayan Olympic Committee
- Website: www.cou.org.uy (in Spanish)

in London
- Competitors: 29 in 8 sports
- Flag bearers: Rodolfo Collazo (opening); Alejandro Foglia (closing)
- Medals: Gold 0 Silver 0 Bronze 0 Total 0

Summer Olympics appearances (overview)
- 1924; 1928; 1932; 1936; 1948; 1952; 1956; 1960; 1964; 1968; 1972; 1976; 1980; 1984; 1988; 1992; 1996; 2000; 2004; 2008; 2012; 2016; 2020; 2024; 2028

Uruguay competed at the 2012 Summer Olympics in London, from 27 July to 12 August 2012. This was the nation's twentieth appearance at the Olympics, Uruguay missed the 1980 Summer Olympics in Moscow, because of its partial support for the United States boycott.

The Uruguayan Olympic Committee (Spanish: Comité Olímpico Uruguayo, COU) sent the nation's largest delegation to the Games since 1968. A total of 29 athletes, 26 men and 3 women, competed in 8 sports. Men's football was the only team-based sport in which Uruguay was represented at these Olympic games. There was only a single competitor in road cycling, judo and shooting.

Notable Uruguayan athletes included football stars Sebastián Coates and team captain Luis Suárez, who both had recently played for Liverpool F.C., siblings Alejandro and Andrea Foglia in men's and women's one-person dinghy sailing, and track hurdler Andrés Silva. Rower Rodolfo Collazo, who competed at his third Olympics along with Silva and the older Foglia, was the nation's flag bearer at the opening ceremony.

Uruguay, however, failed to win its first Olympic medal since the 2000 Summer Olympics in Sydney, where track cyclist Milton Wynants won silver in the points race (currently replaced by the omnium).

== Athletics ==
Uruguay has qualified one athlete in the men's 400 m hurdles through the "A" standard qualification time and qualified one athlete in the women's 400 m hurdles:

Key

- Note–Ranks given for track events are within the athlete's heat only
- Q = Qualified for the next round
- q = Qualified for the next round as a fastest loser or, in field events, by position without achieving the qualifying target
- NR = National record
- N/A = Round not applicable for the event
- Bye = Athlete not required to compete in round

Men

Athlete	Event	Heat		Semifinal		Final	
Athlete	Event	Result	Rank	Result	Rank	Result	Rank
Andrés Silva	400 m hurdles	53.38	8	Did not advance			

Women

Athlete	Event	Heat		Semifinal		Final	
Athlete	Event	Result	Rank	Result	Rank	Result	Rank
Déborah Rodríguez	400 m hurdles	57.04 NR	7	Did not advance			

== Cycling ==
Uruguay had qualified one cyclist in the men's road race through the UCI America tour.

=== Road ===
Athlete	Event	Time	Rank
Jorge Soto	Men's road race	Did not finish	

== Football ==
Uruguay qualified a team in the men's tournament through the 2011 South American Youth Championship.

=== Men's tournament ===
Team roster

The following is the Uruguay squad in the men's football tournament of the 2012 Summer Olympics.

Coach: Óscar Tabárez

No.	Pos.	Player	Date of birth (age)	Caps	Goals	2012 club
1	GK	Martín Campaña	29 May 1989 (aged 23)	3	0	(Uruguayan Football Association) Cerro Largo
2	DF	Ramón Arias	27 July 1992 (aged 19)	3	0	(Uruguayan Football Association) Defensor Sporting
3	DF	Diego Polenta	6 February 1992 (aged 20)	1	0	(Italian Football Federation) Genoa
4	DF	Sebastián Coates	7 October 1990 (aged 21)	2	0	(The Football Association) Liverpool
5	DF	Emiliano Albín	24 January 1989 (aged 23)	3	0	(Uruguayan Football Association) Peñarol
6	DF	Alexis Rolín	7 February 1989 (aged 23)	3	0	(Uruguayan Football Association) Nacional
7	FW	Edinson Cavani*	14 February 1987 (aged 25)	2	3	(Italian Football Federation) Napoli
8	MF	Maximiliano Calzada	21 April 1990 (aged 22)	3	0	(Uruguayan Football Association) Nacional
9	FW	Luis Suárez* (c)	24 January 1987 (aged 25)	2	3	(The Football Association) Liverpool
10	MF	Gastón Ramírez	2 December 1990 (aged 21)	2	1	(Italian Football Federation) Bologna
11	FW	Abel Hernández	8 August 1990 (aged 21)	2	1	(Italian Football Federation) Palermo
12	FW	Jonathan Urretaviscaya	19 March 1990 (aged 22)	2	0	(Portuguese Football Federation) Benfica
13	DF	Matías Aguirregaray	1 April 1989 (aged 23)	2	0	(Italian Football Federation) Palermo
14	MF	Nicolás Lodeiro	21 March 1989 (aged 23)	2	0	(Brazilian Football Confederation) Botafogo
15	MF	Diego Rodríguez	4 September 1989 (aged 22)	3	0	(Uruguayan Football Association) Defensor Sporting
16	MF	Tabaré Viudez	8 September 1989 (aged 22)	3	0	(Uruguayan Football Association) Nacional
17	MF	Egidio Arévalo*	1 January 1982 (aged 30)	2	0	(Italian Football Federation) Palermo
18	GK	Leandro Gelpi	27 February 1991 (aged 21)	0	0	(Uruguayan Football Association) Peñarol

* Over-aged player.

Group play

Pos	Team	Pld	W	D	L	GF	GA	GD	Pts	Qualification
1	Great Britain (H)	3	2	1	0	5	2	+3	7	Advance to knockout stage
2	Senegal	3	1	2	0	4	2	+2	5	Advance to knockout stage
3	Uruguay	3	1	0	2	2	4	−2	3	
4	United Arab Emirates	3	0	1	2	3	6	−3	1	

Source: FIFA
Rules for classification: Group stage tiebreakers
(H) Hosts
26 July 2012
17:00

United Arab Emirates	1–2	Uruguay
Matar 23'	Report	Ramírez 42'; Lodeiro 56'

Old Trafford, Manchester
Attendance: 51,745
Referee: Peter O'Leary (New Zealand)

29 July 2012
17:00

Senegal	2–0	Uruguay
Konaté 10', 37'	Report

Wembley Stadium, London
Attendance: 75,093
Referee: Felix Brych (Germany)

1 August 2012
19:45

Great Britain	1–0	Uruguay
Sturridge 45+1'	Report

Millennium Stadium, Cardiff
Attendance: 70,438
Referee: Yuichi Nishimura (Japan)

== Judo ==
Uruguay had qualified one judoka in the men's middleweight (90 kg) class through additional places for the Americas.

Athlete	Event	Round of 32	Round of 16	Quarterfinals	Semifinals	Repechage	Final / BM	
Athlete	Event	Opposition Result	Opposition Result	Opposition Result	Opposition Result	Opposition Result	Opposition Result	Rank
Juan Romero	Men's −90 kg	Song D-n (KOR); L 0000–1001	Did not advance					

== Rowing ==
Uruguay had qualified one boat in the men's lightweight double sculls through the Latin America Continental Qualification Regatta.

Men

Athlete	Event	Heats		Repechage		Semifinals		Final	
Athlete	Event	Time	Rank	Time	Rank	Time	Rank	Time	Rank
Rodolfo Collazo; Emiliano Dumestre	Lightweight double sculls	6:58.63	4 R	6:51.67	5 SC/D	7:11.20	3 FC	6:51.94	16

Qualification Legend: FA=Final A (medal); FB=Final B (non-medal); FC=Final C (non-medal); FD=Final D (non-medal); FE=Final E (non-medal); FF=Final F (non-medal); SA/B=Semifinals A/B; SC/D=Semifinals C/D; SE/F=Semifinals E/F; QF=Quarterfinals; R=Repechage

== Sailing ==
Uruguay had qualified one boat each for the following events.

Men

Athlete	Event	Race											Net points	Final rank
Athlete	Event	1	2	3	4	5	6	7	8	9	10	M*	Net points	Final rank
Alejandro Foglia	Laser	15	3	28	27	~~30~~	6	9	3	5	6	2	106	8

Women

Athlete	Event	Race											Net points	Final rank
Athlete	Event	1	2	3	4	5	6	7	8	9	10	M*	Net points	Final rank
Andrea Foglia	Laser Radial	39	34	37	26	32	~~40~~	38	31	33	33	EL	303	38

M = Medal race; EL = Eliminated – did not advance into the medal race;

== Shooting ==
Uruguay had qualified one shooter in the men's 10 m air rifle.

Men

Athlete	Event	Qualification		Final	
Athlete	Event	Points	Rank	Points	Rank
Rudi Lausarot	10 m air rifle	575	47	Did not advance	

== Swimming ==
Uruguay had qualified one swimmer in the men's 100 m freestyle through the Olympic selection time, and the other in the women's 100 m backstroke as a wildcard:

Men

Athlete	Event	Heat		Semifinal		Final	
Athlete	Event	Time	Rank	Time	Rank	Time	Rank
Gabriel Melconian	100 m freestyle	50.68	35	Did not advance			

Women

Athlete	Event	Heat		Semifinal		Final	
Athlete	Event	Time	Rank	Time	Rank	Time	Rank
Inés Remersaro	100 m backstroke	1:08.03	43	Did not advance			

== See also ==
- Uruguay at the 2011 Pan American Games
