= Rowing at the 2010 South American Games – Men's lightweight four =

The Men's lightweight four event at the 2010 South American Games was held over March 22 at 11:20.

== Medalists ==
Gold	Silver	Bronze
Mario Cejas; Nicolai Fernandez; Carlo Lauro; Pablo Manhic; Argentina	Miguel Angel Silva; Rodrigo Santibanez; Felipe Zbinden; Fabian Zbinden; Chile	no medal

== Records ==
World Best Time
World best time	Denmark	5:45.60	Lucerne, Switzerland	1999

== Results ==
Rank	Rowers	Country	Time
1st place, gold medalist(s)	Mario Cejas, Nicolai Fernandez, Carlo Lauro, Pablo Manhic	Argentina	6:21.25
2nd place, silver medalist(s)	Miguel Angel Silva, Rodrigo Santibanez, Felipe Zbinden, Fabian Zbinden	Chile	6:21.56
3	Renato Azevedo, João Borges Junior, Renan Castro, Leandro Atoji	Brazil	6:39.03
