= Rowing at the 2010 South American Games – Men's lightweight single sculls =

The Men's lightweight single sculls event at the 2010 South American Games was held over March 21 at 9:20.

== Medalists ==
Gold	Silver	Bronze
Ailson Silva; Brazil	Rodrigo Forero; Colombia	Jackson Vincent; Venezuela

== Records ==
World Best Time
World best time	Zac Purchase (GBR)	6:47.82	Eton, England	2006

== Results ==
Rank	Rowers	Country	Time
1st place, gold medalist(s)	Ailson Silva	Brazil	7:17.79
2nd place, silver medalist(s)	Rodrigo Forero	Colombia	7:26.98
3rd place, bronze medalist(s)	Jackson Vincent	Venezuela	7:29.46
4	Matias Molina	Argentina	7:35.36
5	Nibaldo Yanez Ortiz	Chile	7:43.45
6	Ricardo Renzo Cortez	Peru	7:58.89
