= Rowing at the 2010 South American Games – Women's double sculls =

The Women's double sculls event at the 2010 South American Games was held over March 22 at 9:00.

== Medalists ==
Gold	Silver	Bronze
Fabiana Beltrame; Carolina Rocha; Brazil	Laura Abalo; Lucia Palermo; Argentina	Maria Jose Montoya; Natalia Camila Sanchez; Peru

== Records ==
World Best Time
World best time	New Zealand	6:38.78	Seville, Spain	2002

== Results ==
Rank	Rowers	Country	Time
1st place, gold medalist(s)	Fabiana Beltrame, Carolina Rocha	Brazil	7:22.32
2nd place, silver medalist(s)	Laura Abalo, Lucia Palermo	Argentina	7:30.98
3rd place, bronze medalist(s)	Maria Jose Montoya, Natalia Camila Sanchez	Peru	7:50.39
4	Roxiery Guerra, Yolennis Majanao	Venezuela	6:48.74
