= 2010–2012 CSV Beach Volleyball Continental Cup =

10 South American nations took part in the 2010–12 Continental Beach Volleyball Cup. In the sub-zonal round each nation was paired off with another with the winner advancing to the zonal round. In the zonal round the five nations played a round robin with the top four advancing to the continental cup final. In the continental cup final was played in a round robin format. The winner will qualify a team to the 2012 Summer Olympics while second and third advance to the final olympic qualification tournament.

== Men ==
=== Sub-Zonal ===
Team 1 (Hosts)	Score	Team 2 (Visitors)
Colombia	2 - 3	Ecuador
Bolivia	0 - 4	Brazil
Argentina	2 - 3	Chile
Uruguay	4 - 0	Paraguay
Peru	0 - 4	Venezuela

=== Zonal ===
- Host: Santiago, Chile
- Dates: November 24–27, 2011

Team	Pld	W	L	MF	MA	Pts
Venezuela	4	4	0	14	2	8
Brazil	4	2	2	9	7	6
Chile	4	2	2	9	7	6
Uruguay	4	2	2	8	8	6
Ecuador	4	0	4	0	12	4

	BRA	CHI	ECU	URU	VEN
Brazil		3–1	4–0	1–3	1–3
Chile	1–3		4–0	3–1	1–3
Ecuador	0–4	0–4		0–4	0–4
Uruguay	3–1	1–3	4–0		0–4
Venezuela	3–1	3–1	4–0	4–0	

- Brazil took second over Chile because they had a better set average.

=== Continental Cup Final ===
- Brazil
- Chile
- Uruguay
- Venezuela

== Final ==
=== Venue ===
- Venezuela

The Final will be contested between Chile and Venezuela.

June 2, 2012	Jackson - Mussa (VEN)	2–0	M.Grimalt - Grimalt (CHI)	Venezuela
June 2, 2012	(21–9, 21–15)			Venezuela

June 2, 2012	Hernandez - Fane (VEN)	2–0	Bussenis - Salinas (CHI)	Venezuela
June 2, 2012	(21–18, 21–16)			Venezuela

June 3, 2012	Jackson - Mussa (VEN)	v	Bussenis - Salinas (CHI)	Venezuela

June 3, 2012	Hernandez - Fane (VEN)	v	M.Grimalt - Grimalt (CHI)	Venezuela

== Women ==
=== Sub-Zonal ===
Team 1 (Hosts)	Score	Team 2 (Visitors)
Colombia	4 - 0	Paraguay
Bolivia	0 - 4	Brazil
Ecuador	1 - 3	Uruguay
Argentina	4 - 0	Peru
Venezuela	4 - 0	Chile

=== Zonal ===
- Host: Guatape, Colombia
- Dates: December 7–11, 2011

Team	Pld	W	L	MF	MA	Pts
Brazil	4	4	0	15	1	8
Argentina	4	3	1	10	6	7
Uruguay	4	1	3	5	11	5
Venezuela	4	1	3	5	11	5
Colombia	4	1	3	5	11	5

	ARG	BRA	COL	URU	VEN
Argentina		1–3	3–1	3–1	3–1
Brazil	3–1		4–0	4–0	4–0
Colombia	1–3	0–4		3–1	1–3
Uruguay	1–3	0–4	1–3		3–1
Venezuela	1–3	0–4	3–1	1–3	

- Uruguay took third, Venezuela took fourth and Colombia took fifth because of set ratio.

=== Continental Cup Final ===
- Argentina
- Brazil
- Uruguay
- Venezuela
