= Rowing at the 2010 South American Games – Women's quadruple sculls =

The Women's quadruple sculls event at the 2010 South American Games was held over March 21 at 10:40.

== Medalists ==
Gold	Silver	Bronze
Laura Abalo; Lucia Palermo; Clara Rohner; Anabela Torres; Argentina	Fabiana Beltrame; Camila Carvalho; Kissya Costa; Carolina Rocha; Brazil	Daniela Johana Hernandez; Soraya Arriaza; Florencia Piederit; Pamela Olave; Chile

== Records ==
World Best Time
World best time	Germany	6:10.80	Duisburg, Germany	1996

== Results ==
Rank	Rowers	Country	Time
1st place, gold medalist(s)	Laura Abalo, Lucia Palermo, Clara Rohner, Anabela Torres	Argentina	7:20.73
2nd place, silver medalist(s)	Fabiana Beltrame, Camila Carvalho, Kissya Costa, Carolina Rocha	Brazil	7:25.48
3rd place, bronze medalist(s)	Daniela Johana Hernandez, Soraya Arriaza, Florencia Piederit, Pamela Olave	Chile	7:41.86
4	Roxiery Guerra, Joselin Izaze, Kimberlin Meneses, Yolennis Majanao	Venezuela	7:52.64
