= Lars Hartig =

German rower (born 1990)

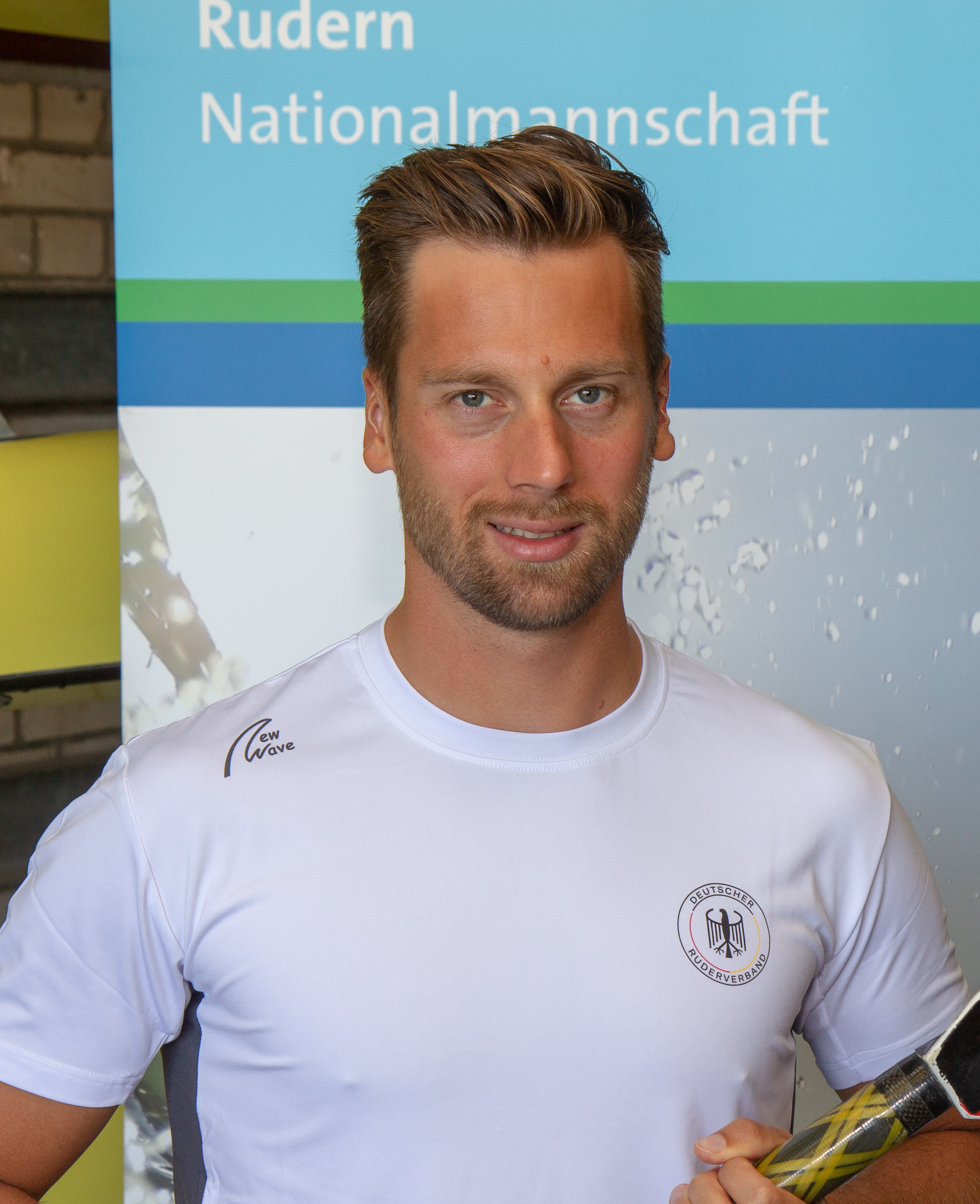
- Hartig in 2018

Personal information
- Born: 24 December 1990 (age 35) Husum, Germany
- Height: 1.90 m (6 ft 3 in)
- Weight: 72 kg (159 lb)

Sport
- Country: Germany
- Sport: Rowing
- Event: Men's lightweight double sculls
- Club: Friedrichstaedter RG
Medal record
Men's rowing
Representing Germany
World Championships
Silver medal – second place	2014 Amsterdam	LM1x
European Championships
Gold medal – first place	2010 Montemor-o-Velho	LM2x
Silver medal – second place	2014 Belgrade	LM2x

Lars Hartig (born 24 December 1990) is a German rower. A World and European medallist, he participated in the 2012 Summer Olympics in London where he competed in the Men's lightweight double sculls event together with his teammate Linus Lichtschlag. They qualified for the A finals, where they reached a sixth place.

In 2010, Hartig and Lichtschlag won the men's lightweight double sculls at the European Championship. The year before, Hartig and Christian Hochbruck won the same event at the U23 World Championships.

In 2014, he won silver in the men's lightweight single sculls at the World Championships, and silver at the European Championships in the men's lightweight double sculls with Konstantin Steinhübel.
