= Douglas Vandor =

Canadian rower

Personal information
- Born: August 25, 1974 (age 50); Montreal, Quebec, Canada
- Height: 1.80 m (5 ft 11 in)
- Weight: 70 kg (150 lb)

Sport
- Country: Canada
- Sport: Rowing
- Event: Men's lightweight double sculls

Douglas Vandor (born August 25, 1974, in Montreal, Quebec) is a Canadian rower. He participated in the 2012 Summer Olympics in London where he competed in the Men's lightweight double sculls event together with his teammate Morgan Jarvis. They qualified for the C finals, where they came in second place, finishing in 14th place overall.

== Post athletic career ==
In 2018, Vandor was named as Canada's chef de mission for the 2019 Pan American Games in Lima, Peru.
