= Patricia Aiyenuro =

British fencing personality

Patricia Obiageli Aiyenuro (born 1964 or 1965) (BEM), known as Pat Aiyenuro, is a British fencing club chair and fencing team manager who she has developed the sport of fencing in the UK over two decades, making it more inclusive and diverse. She has managed the Great Britain Junior/Cadet National Fencing Team. She is president of the British Fencing Federation, a member of the British Fencing Championships Equality and Diversity Commission, and is on the executive committee of the Fédération Internationale d'Escrime (FIE), the international governing body of fencing.

== Early life and career ==
Patricia Obiageli Aiyenuro was born in Manchester. Her parents were from Asaba the capital of Delta State, in Nigeria. They came to the UK in the early 1960s. Aiyenuro, a single parent working as a research assistant at the London School of Hygiene and Tropical Medicine, helped out at club level at first and soon became chair of the Camden Fencing Club. Her focus as chair of the Camden club was to make fencing, usually considered an expensive, elitist sport, accessible to less well-off local people. Under her management the club became very successful, winning gold at the London Youth Games in 2017. Aiyenuro was involved in the launch of a women-only programme for women of all ages, religions and backgrounds. She volunteered for two decades at all levels of the sport, including managing Senior, Junior and Cadet GBR teams at European and World Championships, and travelling internationally with fencers. In 2020, Aiyenuro was the first black woman to be elected to the board of the British Fencing Federation. She became the international relations director, anti-doping Lead and board lead for para fencing. She was re-elected to the board in 2024. In 2024, Aiyenuro took part in the UK Sport International Leadership Mentoring programme where she was mentored by Jenny Shute MBE.

In 2025, Aiyenuro became president of the British Fencing Federation. Her term runs until after the Los Angeles 2028 Olympic and Paralympic Games. In her current role, she has fostered relationships within the international fencing community, the federation pledging technical support to the Nigerian Fencing Federation for example.

In 2025, Aiyenuro was elected to the executive committee of the Fédération Internationale d'Escrime (FIE). She is the first Great Britain representative in twelve years and the first black woman to be elected to the international governing body of fencing.

== Personal life ==
Aiyenuro was widowed when her son Soji and daughter Funmilayo were young children. She has held all her fencing roles as an unpaid volunteer while working as a medical entomologist, principal scientific officer, at the London School of Hygiene and Tropical Medicine and while completing a Ph.D.

Aiyenuro's son, Soji, started fencing when he was 10 years old. He went on to win the UK Schools Championships, won the individual male sabre contest in the 2012 Commonwealth Junior Fencing Championships and became a fencing coach.

== Awards ==
In 2016, Aiyenuro was awarded 'Unsung hero' at the British Fencing Association dinner.

In 2017, at age 53, Aiyenuro was awarded the British Empire Medal (BEM) for services to Sport in the London Borough of Camden.

She collected an Outstanding Team Management Award after the Camden fencing team won double gold at the London Youth Games.
