= Zhang Fangbing =

Chinese rower

Personal information
- Nationality: Chinese
- Born: 19 January 1990 (age 35); Binzhou, China

Sport
- Sport: Rowing

Zhang Fangbing (born 19 January 1990) is a Chinese rower. He competed in the men's lightweight double sculls event at the 2012 Summer Olympics, with Sun Jie, finishing in 15th place.
