= Rowing at the 2010 South American Games – Women's pair =

The Women's pair event at the 2010 South American Games was held on March 22 at 11:40.

== Medalists ==
Gold	Silver	Bronze
Laura Abalo; Gabriela Best; Argentina	Fabiana Beltrame; Kissya Costa; Brazil	no medal

== Records ==
World Best Time
World best time	Romania	6:53.80	Seville, Spain	2002

== Results ==
Rank	Rowers	Country	Time
1st place, gold medalist(s)	Laura Abalo, Gabriela Besy	Argentina	7:51.90
2nd place, silver medalist(s)	Fabiana Beltrame, Kissya Costa	Brazil	7:59.65
3	Maria Jose Montoya, Natalia Camila Sanchez	Peru	8:42.65
