= Mark Hunter (rower) =

British rower (born 1978)

Mark Hunter MBE
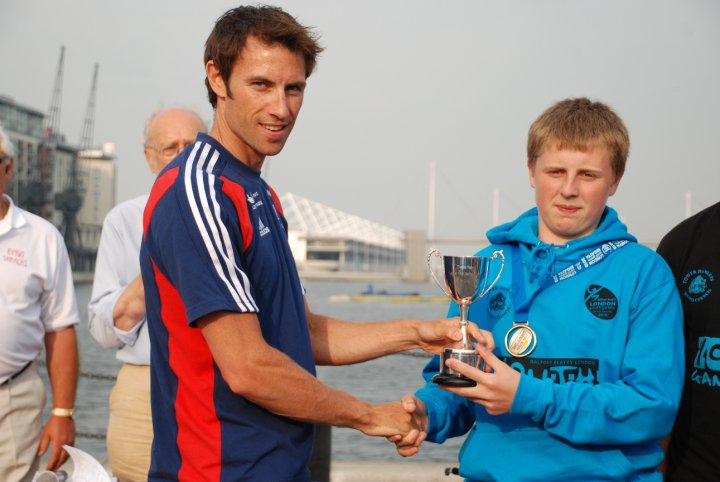

Personal information
- Nationality: British
- Born: 1 July 1978 (age 48) Forest Gate, Greater London, England
- Height: 183 cm (6.00 ft)
- Weight: 11 st (70 kg)

Sport
- Country: Great Britain
- Sport: Men's rowing
- Event: Lightweight Double Sculls
- Club: Leander Club
- Coached by: Darren Whiter
Medal record
Men's rowing
Representing Great Britain
Olympic Games
Gold medal – first place	2008 Beijing	Lightweight double sculls
Silver medal – second place	2012 London	Lightweight double sculls
World Championships
Gold medal – first place	2010 Karapiro	Lightweight double sculls
Gold medal – first place	2011 Bled	Lightweight double sculls
Bronze medal – third place	2007 Munich	Lightweight double sculls

Mark John Hunter MBE (born 1 July 1978) is a retired British rower.

== Rowing career ==
Hunter was born in Forest Gate, London and he attended Havering Sixth Form College. While representing Havering in the London Youth Games, he took part in some of his early rowing competitions. In 2007 he partnered Zac Purchase in the Great Britain Lightweight Men's Double Scull. They won medals at each World Cup Regatta through the season. At the World Rowing Championships in Munich-Oberschleissheim they won a bronze medal. The following year, their double dominated the lightweight event, winning all of their races, and finishing the season as Olympic champions. After a year off in 2009, they took Gold at the 2010 World Championships at Lake Karapiro in New Zealand. He was part of the British squad that topped the medal table at the 2011 World Rowing Championships in Bled, where he won a gold medal as part of the lightweight double sculls with Zac Purchase.

In 2013, Hunter announced his retirement from competitive rowing.

== Coaching ==
During his year off after the 2008 Olympics, he was an assistant coach of UCLA Women's rowing program.

== Awards ==
He was appointed Member of the Order of the British Empire (MBE) in the 2009 New Year Honours, and was awarded an Honorary Doctor of Science from the University of East London (UEL) in November 2009.

In 2009, Hunter was inducted into the London Youth Games Hall of Fame, and he was also granted an MBE for his services to rowing.

== Personal life ==
As of 2024, Hunter works in people consulting, for EY.

== Achievements ==
=== Olympics ===
- 2012 London – Silver, Lightweight Double Scull
- 2008 Beijing – Gold, Lightweight Double Scull (stroke)

=== World Championships ===
- 2011 Bled – Gold, Lightweight Double Scull
- 2010 Lake Karapiro – Gold, Lightweight Double Scull
- 2007 Munich – Bronze, Lightweight Double Scull

=== World Cups ===
- 2012 Belgrade- Gold, Lightweight Double Scull (stroke)
- 2010 Munich – Gold, Lightweight Double Scull (stroke)
- 2008 Poznań – Gold, Lightweight Double Scull (stroke)
- 2008 Lucerne – Gold, Lightweight Double Scull (stroke)
- 2008 Munich – Gold, Lightweight Double Scull (stroke)
- 2007 Lucerne – Silver, Lightweight Double Scull
- 2007 Amsterdam – Silver, Lightweight Double Scull
- 2007 Ottensheim – Bronze, Lightweight Double Scull
- 2005 Munich – 6th, Lightweight Double Scull
- 2005 Eton – 4th, Lightweight Double Scull

=== Nations Cup ===
- 1999 – 8th, Heavyweight Double Scull
- 1998 – 9th, Heavyweight Double Scull
- 1997 – 10th, Heavyweight Quadruple Scull

=== GB Rowing Team Senior Trials ===
- 2011 – 4th, Lightweight Single Scull

2008–2009 Coached for UCLA Women's Rowing Team
