= London Youth Games =

Multi-sport event in London, England

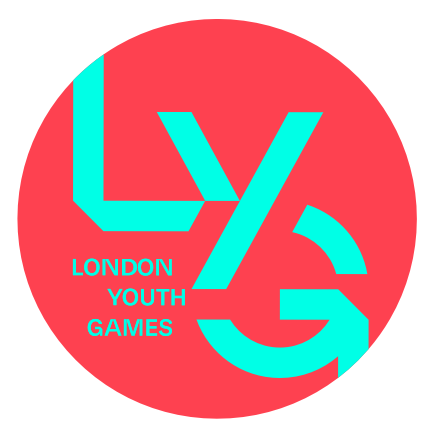
- Venue: Crystal Palace National Sports Centre and others
- Established: 1977
- Participants: Est. 1.5m to date (2020)
- Sponsor: Nike

The London Youth Games is an annual multi-sport event held in London, England. The London Youth Games offer competitive opportunities for young people aged 7 to 18 (who live or go to school in London) across approximately 30 sports every year. The London Youth Games are contested between the 32 London boroughs (as well as the City of London) and take place at venues across the capital nine months of the year.

The focal point is finals weekend at the National Sports Centre in Crystal Palace, which traditionally takes place on the first weekend in July. But there are around 50 events that take place annually including qualifying rounds and stand alone finals at venues as prestigious as Lord's, Copper Box Arena and Hampstead Heath. The London Youth Games is free and open to all young people living in or going to school in London.

Notable past participants include four-times Olympic gold medallist Mo Farah, Premier League and England Footballer Raheem Sterling and World and European sprinting gold medallist Dina Asher-Smith.

The London Youth Games is funded mainly via commercial support from headline sponsor Nike, membership contributions from each of the London local authorities and Sport England National Lottery support. The London Youth Games are organised and managed by the London Youth Games Foundation, which is a registered charity (1048705)., representatives from the London boroughs and a number of independent trustees who make up the board of trustees.

The London Youth Games are delivered by a small team of full-time staff, Borough Team Organisers (BTO's) from London's local authorities, School Games Organisers (SGOs), representatives of Sporting National Governing Bodies (NGBs) and around 4,000 volunteers from the London Youth Games volunteering programme GamesForce.

== History ==
=== Origins ===
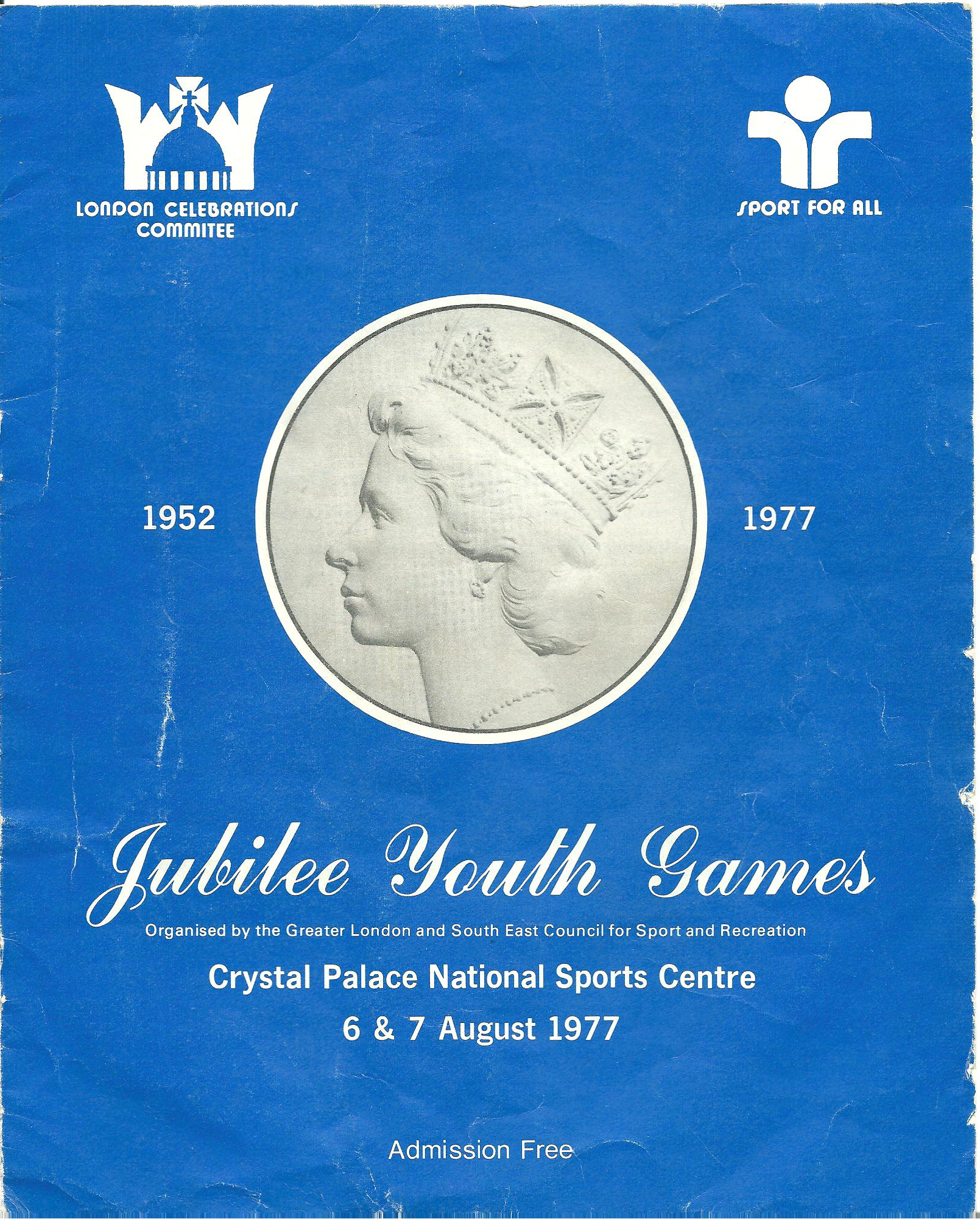
1977 Programme

=== 1978–1989 ===
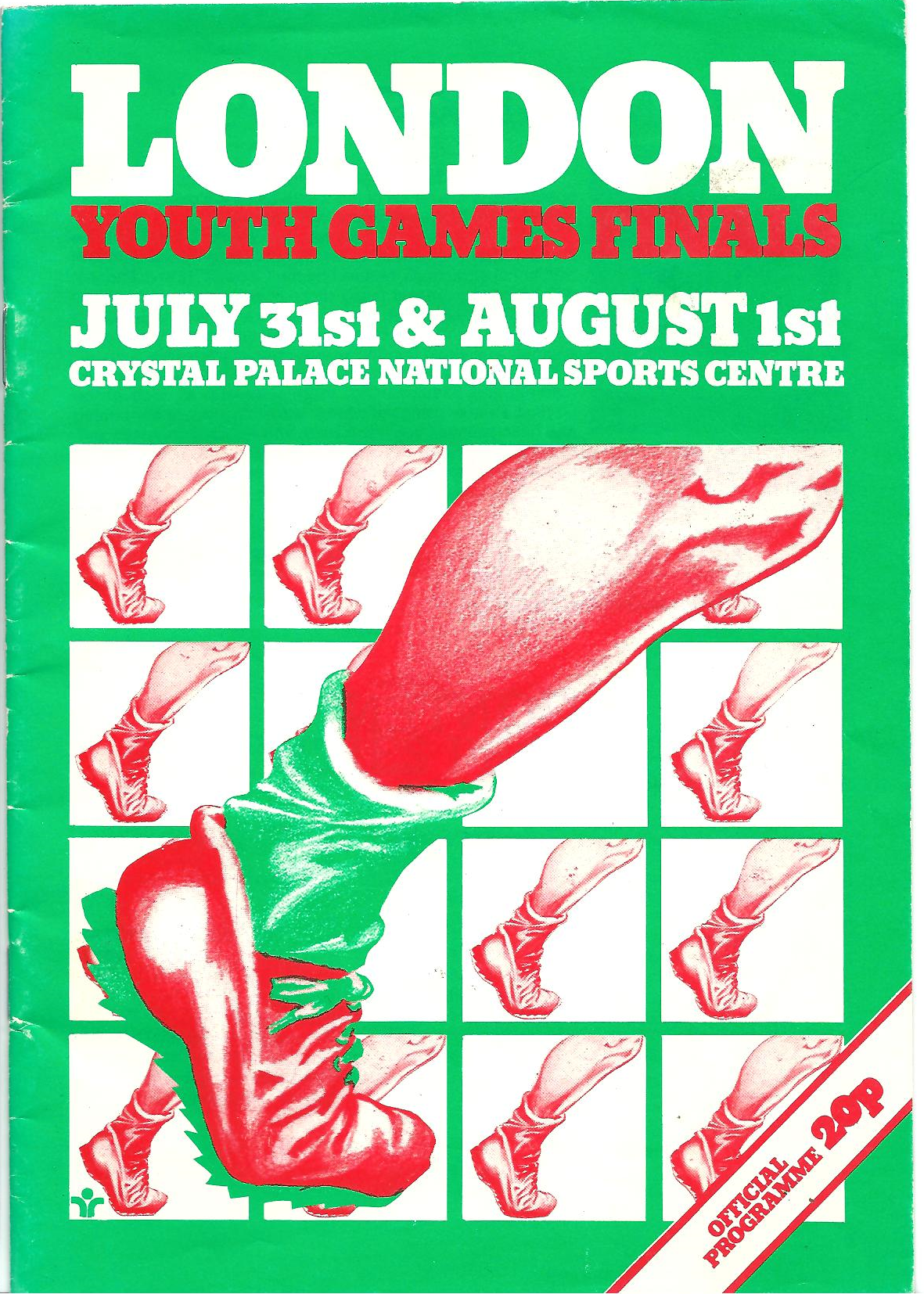
1982 Programme

=== 1990–1999 ===
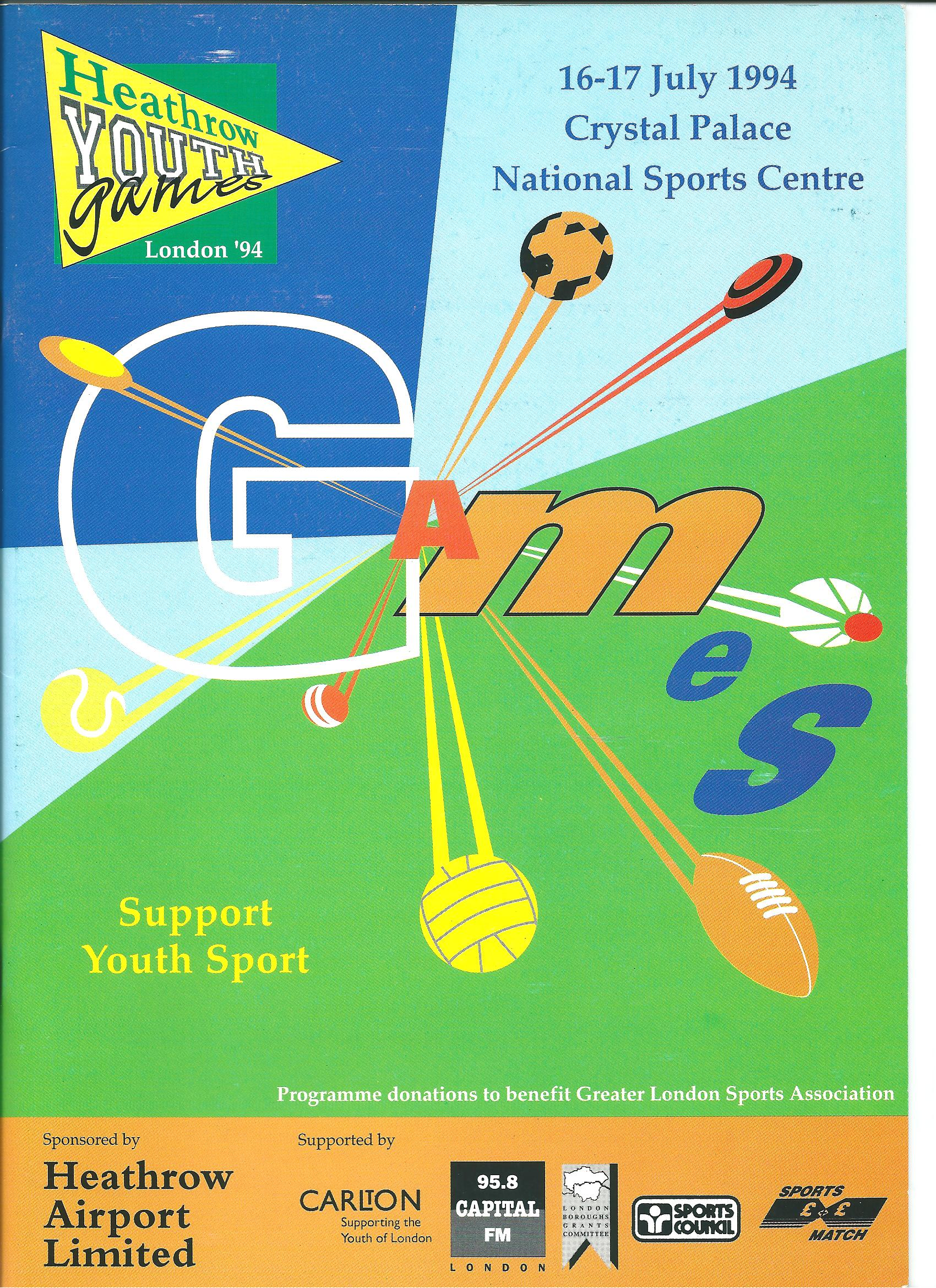
1994 programme

=== 2000–2009 ===
A four-day national Youth Games final of the winning teams from all 43 Area Youth Games in the UK took place in Southampton in August 2000. London sent two squads to represent the city at 'The BAA Millennium Youth Games' in the 12 sports competitions.

=== 2010–2019 ===
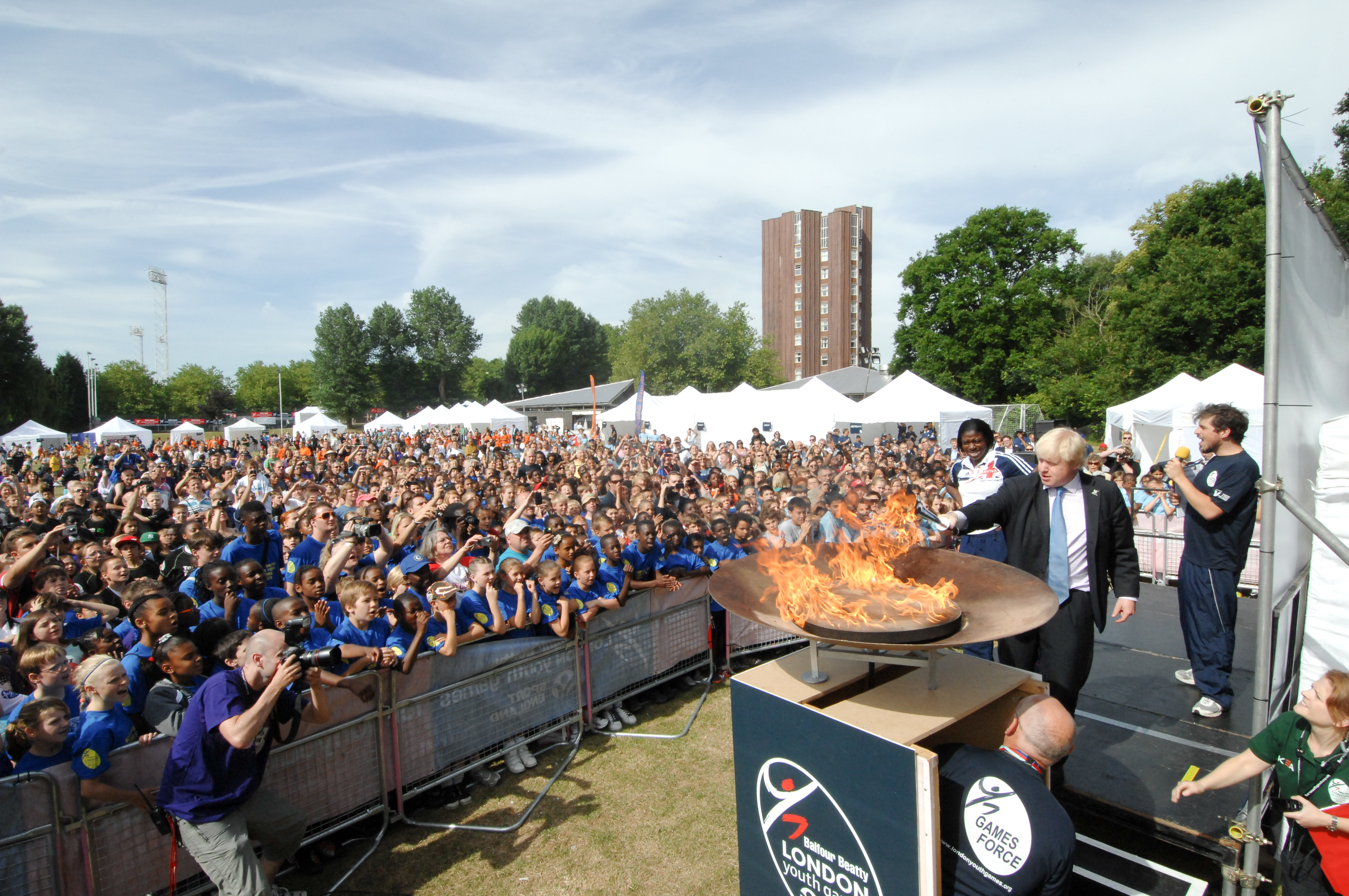
Boris Johnson lights the flame at the 2010 London Youth Games Opening Ceremony

The London Youth Games was well represented at London 2012 with 44 former participants competing in the 2012 Olympics and 2012 Paralympics.

== Sports ==
The London Youth Games has consisted of multiple sports since its inception. Below is a list of sports that have been included in the London Youth Games at any time since 1977. Those in italics were part of the inaugural London Youth Games in 1977 and those in bold are part of the London Youth Games as of 2020:

- Angling
- **Archery**
- **Aquatic sports**
  - **Diving**
  - **Swimming**
  - **Water polo**
- **Athletics**
  - **Cross country**
  - **Track and field**
- **Badminton**
- **Basketball**
- **Boccia**
- **Canoeing**
  - Polo
  - **Sprint**
  - **Slalom**
- **Cricket**
  - **Indoor cricket**
- **Cycling**
  - **Road**
  - **BMX**
- **Curling**
  - **New Age Kurling**
- **Dance**
- Darts
- Dragon boat
- Equestrian sports
  - Showjumping
- **Fencing**
- **Football**
- **Golf**
  - **Tri Golf**
- **Gymnastics**
  - **Artistic gymnastics**
  - **Trampolining**
- **Handball**
- **Hockey**
- **Judo**
- Karate
- **Netball**
  - **High 5 Netball**
- **NFL**
- **Rowing**
  - **Indoor rowing**
- **Rugby union**
- RUGBY LEAGUE
  - **Rugby sevens**
  - **Tag rugby**
- **Sailing**
- Skiing
- **Squash**
- **Table tennis**
- **Tennis**
- **Triathlon**
  - **Aquathlon**
- **Volleyball**
- **Weightlifting**

== The Jubilee Trophy and Schools Shield ==
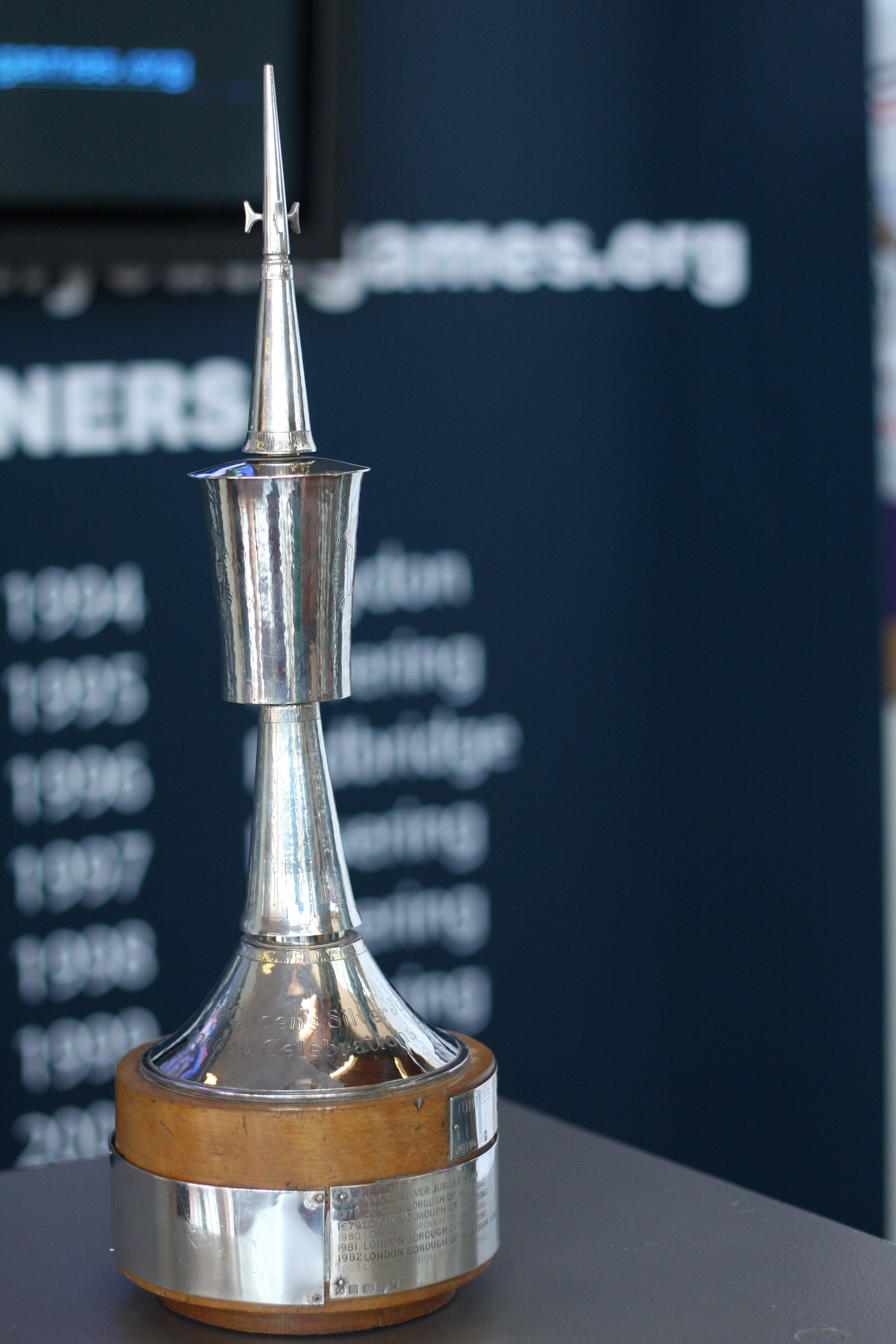
The Jubilee Trophy

Every year since its launch in 1977, the Jubilee Trophy has been presented to the overall winning borough and, since 2012, to the winning borough in the Open Games programme. The School Games is scored separately and the overall winning borough in the schools competition is awarded the Schools Shield. Havering are the most successful borough in the history of the London Youth Games.

== Notable participants ==
The London Youth Games has been a stepping stone in the careers of many of the UK's most successful sportsmen and sportswomen, plus some who have succeeding outside of competitive sport. Below is a list of notable personalities who have represented their borough at London Youth Games.

=== Athletics ===
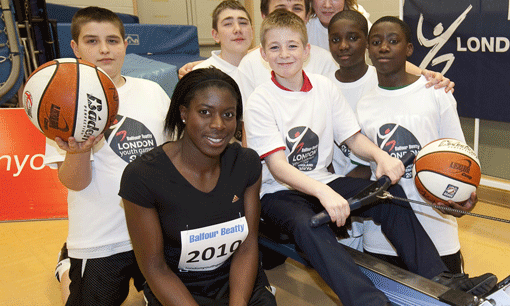
Christine Ohuruogu at the 2010 London Youth Games

Jackie Agyepong, Dina Asher-Smith, Steve Backley, Jack Binstead, Julia Bleasdale, Abdul Buhari, Linford Christie, Tasha Danvers, Monique Davis, Tyrone Edgar, Mo Farah, Jo Fenn, Rikki Fifton, Dalton Grant, Desiree Henry, John Herbert, JJ Jegede, Jade Johnson, Jeanette Kwakye, Joice Maduaka, Daryll Neita, Christine Ohuruogu, Tosin Oke, Samson Oni, Scott Overall, Abi Oyepitan, Asha Philip, Kyle Powell, John Regis, Sabrina Sinha, Laura Turner, David Weir, Benedict Whitby, Conrad Williams, Nadia Williams

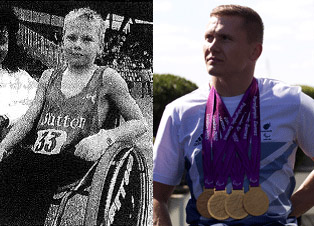
David Weir 1989

=== Badminton ===
Aamir Ghaffar, Rajiv Ouseph, Charlene White

=== Basketball ===
Ogo Adegboye, Matthew Bryan-Amaning, Steve Bucknall, Arek Deng, Ajou Deng, Luol Deng, Temi Fagbenle, Rosalee Mason, Pops Mensah-Bonsu, Azania Stewart, Andrew Sullivan

=== Cricket ===
Rory Hamilton-Brown, Susie Rowe

=== Cycling ===
Erick Rowsell, Tao Geoghegan Hart Jo Rowsell, Bradley Wiggins

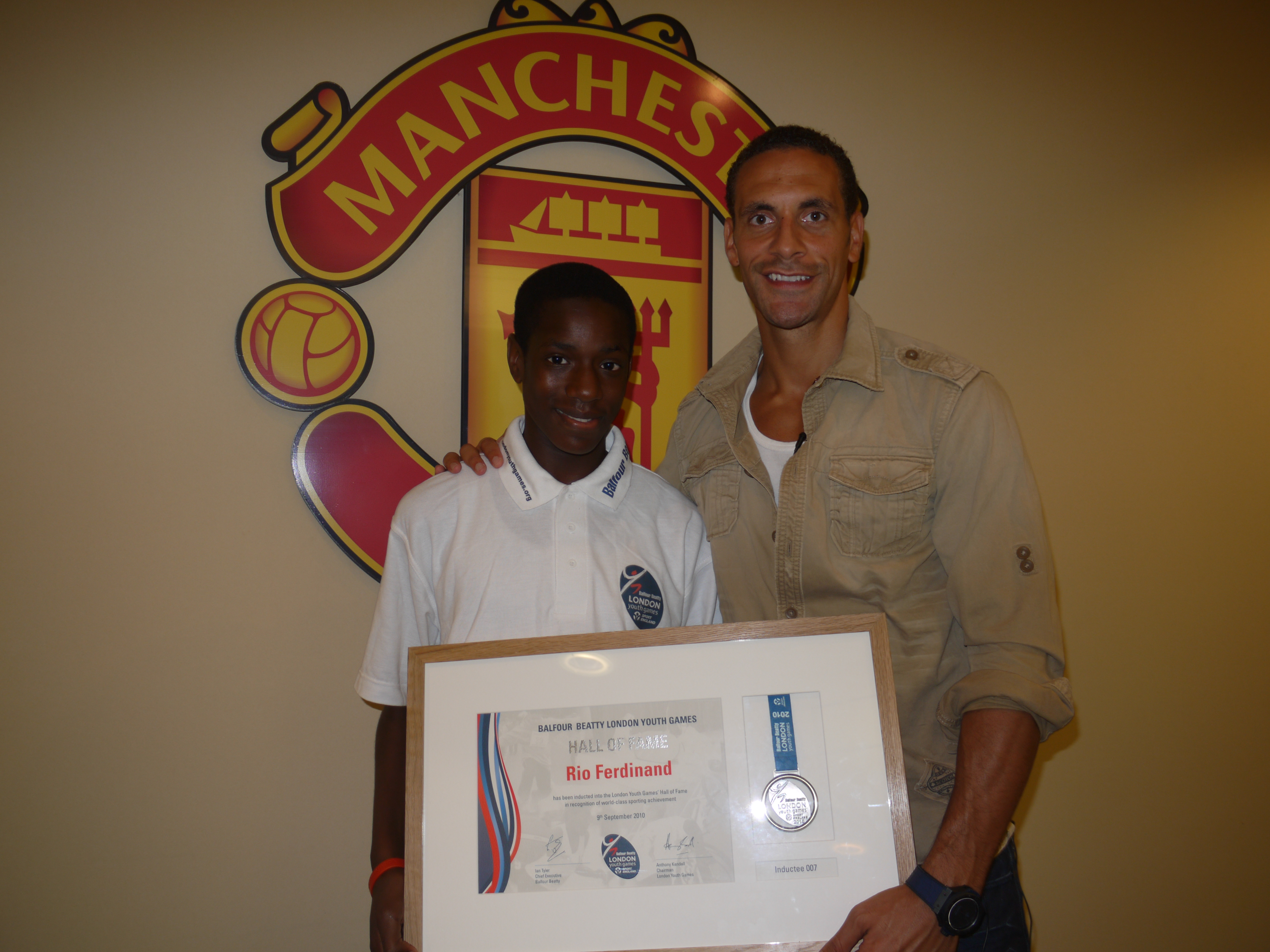
Rio Ferdinand receives his London Youth Games Hall of Fame award in 2010

=== Diving ===
Tony Ally, Blake Aldridge, Peter Waterfield

=== Fencing ===
James-Andrew Davis, Richard Kruse, Soji Aiyenuro (son of Patricia Aiyenuro) , Curtis Miller, Laurence Halstead

=== Football ===
Chris Bart-Williams, Siobhan Chamberlain, Ashley Cole, Dickson Etuhu, Gavin Hoyte, Jordon Ibe, Justin Hoyte, Ledley King, Eartha Pond, Claire Rafferty, Jadon Sancho Lianne Sanderson, Alex Scott, Danny Shittu, Marvin Sordell, Raheem Sterling, Casey Stoney, Fara Williams, Rachel Yankey

=== Gymnastics ===
Chris Bower, Rio Ferdinand, Warren Russell of Diversity (dance troupe)

=== Hockey ===
Sophie Bray, Darren Cheesman, Dan Shingles

=== Judo ===
Victoria Dunn, Gemma Gibbons, Karina Bryant, Winston Gordon, Michelle Holt, Ashley McKenzie, Nekoda Smythe-Davis

=== Kayak / Canoe ===
Lizzie Broughton, Leanne Brown, Richard Hounslow, Stelian Naftanaila, Lucy Ormorod, Marthe de Ferrer

=== Karate ===
Rachel Newey

=== Netball ===
Kadeem Corbin, Sasha Corbin, Amanda Newton

=== Rugby ===
Maggie Alphonsi, Abi Chamberlain, Helen Clayton, Louise Horgan, Katy Storie, Topsy Ojo

=== Rowing ===
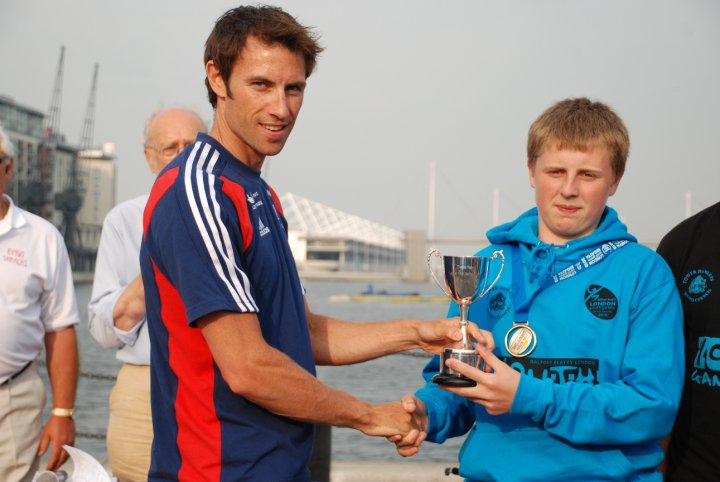
Mark Hunter at the 2010 London Youth Games Regatta

Tom Aggar, Ryan Chamberlain, Mark Hunter, Naomi Riches

=== Skiing ===
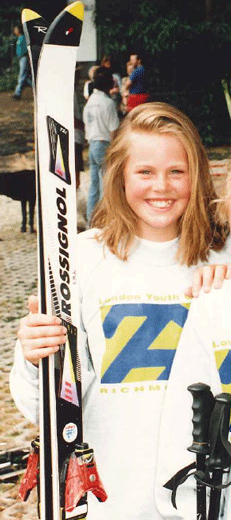
Chemmy Alcott 1994

Chemmy Alcott, Aaron Tipping

=== Squash ===
Paul Johnson, Dominique Lloyd-Walter, Alison Waters

=== Swimming ===
Elaine Barrett, Ellen Gandy, Dervis Konuralp, Zara Long, Amy Marren, Craig Moate

=== Table Tennis ===
Darius Knight

=== Tennis ===
Anne Keothavong

=== Triathlon ===
Tim Don, Stuart Hayes, Jodie Swallow

=== Volleyball ===
Dami Bakare, Peter Bakare, Lucy Boulton, Natasha Brewer, Lizzie Reid, Darius Setsoafia, Yasser Slitti, Nikki Strachan

=== Weightlifting ===
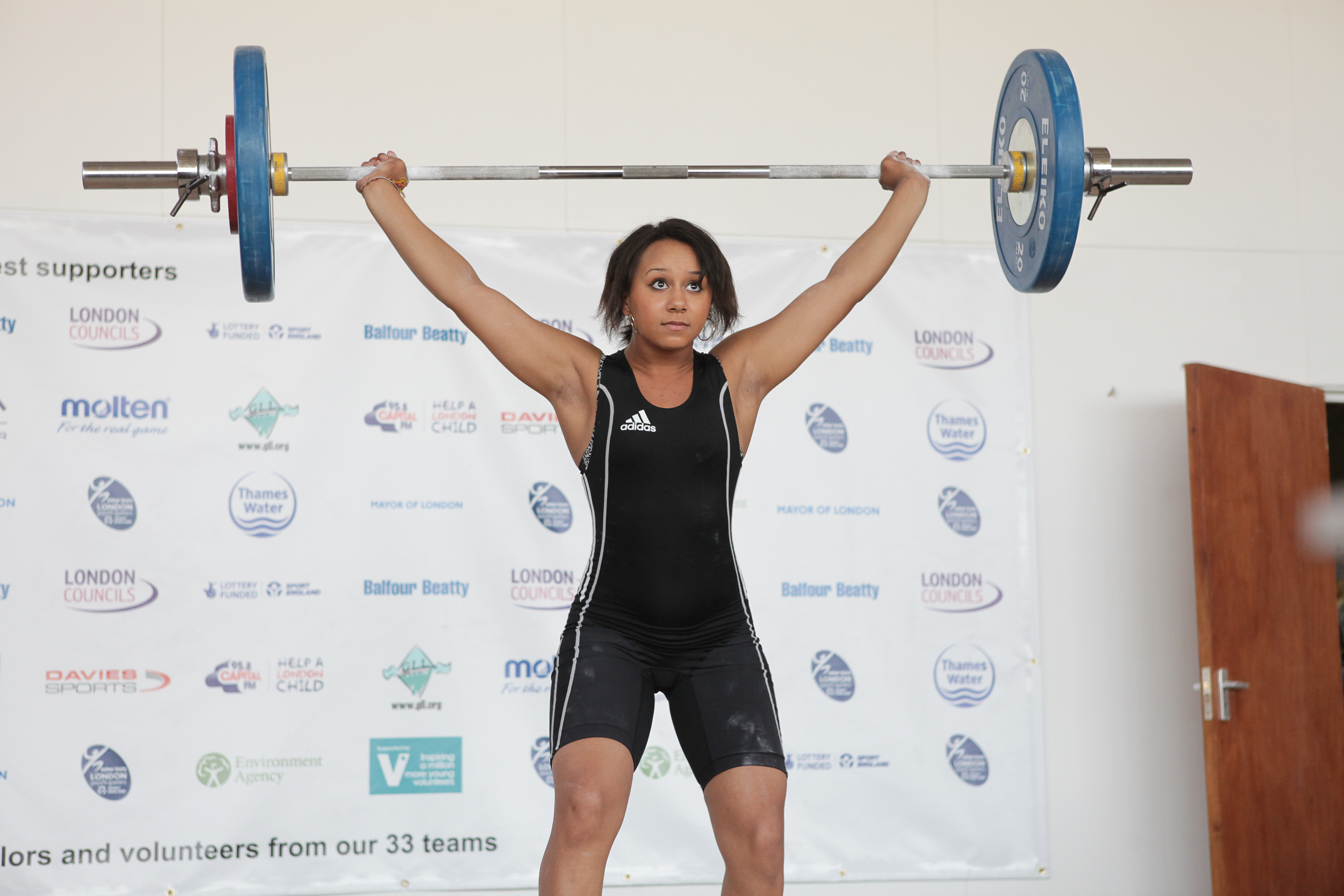
Zoe Smith

Joanne Calvino, Darren Holloway, Jack Oliver, Zoe Smith, Emily Godley, Mercy Brown

== Hall of Fame ==
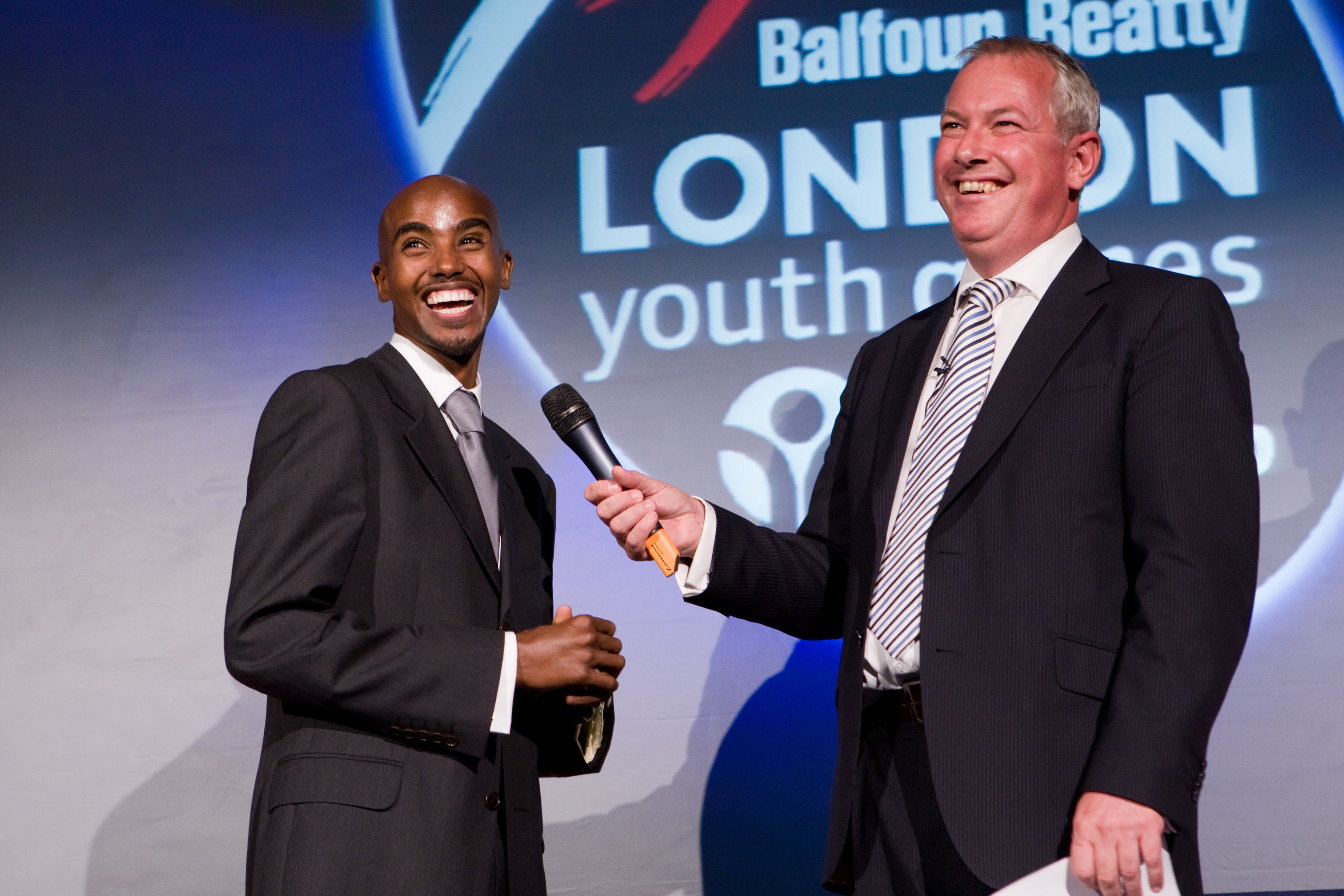
Mo Farah at the 2010 Hall of Fame

The London Youth Games Hall of Fame was established in 2009. It is made up of former competitors who have progressed from the London Youth Games to the world stage.

Former 100m champion Linford Christie (Hammersmith and Fulham), 400m champion Christine Ohuruogu (Newham), javelin thrower Steve Backley (Bexley), Chicago Bulls and GB basketball captain Luol Deng (Croydon), rower Mark Hunter (Havering) and Paralympic swimmer Dervis Konuralp (Greenwich) were the first Hall of Fame inductees in 2009 at a prestigious ceremony at Battersea.

From 2010 to 2012, the Hall of Fame evening moved to Lord's Cricket Ground. In 2010, the inductees were 400m hurdler Tasha Danvers (Lambeth and Croydon), long-distance runner Mo Farah (Hounslow), England footballer Rio Ferdinand (Southwark), netball player Amanda Newton (Newham), Paralympic athlete David Weir (Sutton) and cyclist Bradley Wiggins (Camden).

The third group of inductees in 2011 were skier Chemmy Alcott (Richmond), Paralympic swimmer Elaine Barrett (Hackney), triathlete Tim Don (Hounslow), high jumper Dalton Grant (Hackney), squash player Paul Johnson (Greenwich), and footballer Rachel Yankey (Brent).

In 2012 the inductees were cyclist Joanna Rowsell (Sutton), Paralympic rower Naomi Riches (Harrow), judo star Gemma Gibbons (Greenwich), canoeist Richard Hounslow (Harrow), England rugby star Maggie Alphonsi (Enfield) and world champion track star John Regis (Lewisham).

The Hall of Fame evening moved on to BAFTA for 2013 and London 2012 judo bronze medallist Karina Bryant (Kingston), England and Arsenal footballer Alex Scott (Tower Hamlets), fencer Richard Kruse (Barnet), Olympic silver medallist diver Peter Waterfield (Waltham Forest) were all inducted, as well as Darren Hall (Waltham Forest), who is considered by many as the best-ever British badminton player.

At the 2014 Hall of Fame evening, Madame Tussauds played host to the evening and the inductees were basketball trailblazer Steve Bucknall, weightlifting champion Zoe Smith and World Champion swimmer Craig Moate. In 2015, the Hall of Fame moved to Shakespeare's Globe Theatre, and England footballers Siobhan Chamberlain and Lianne Sanderson were among the inductees.

== Gallery ==
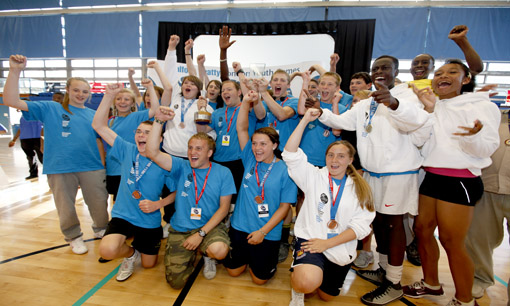
Havering celebrate winning the Jubilee Trophy in 2009

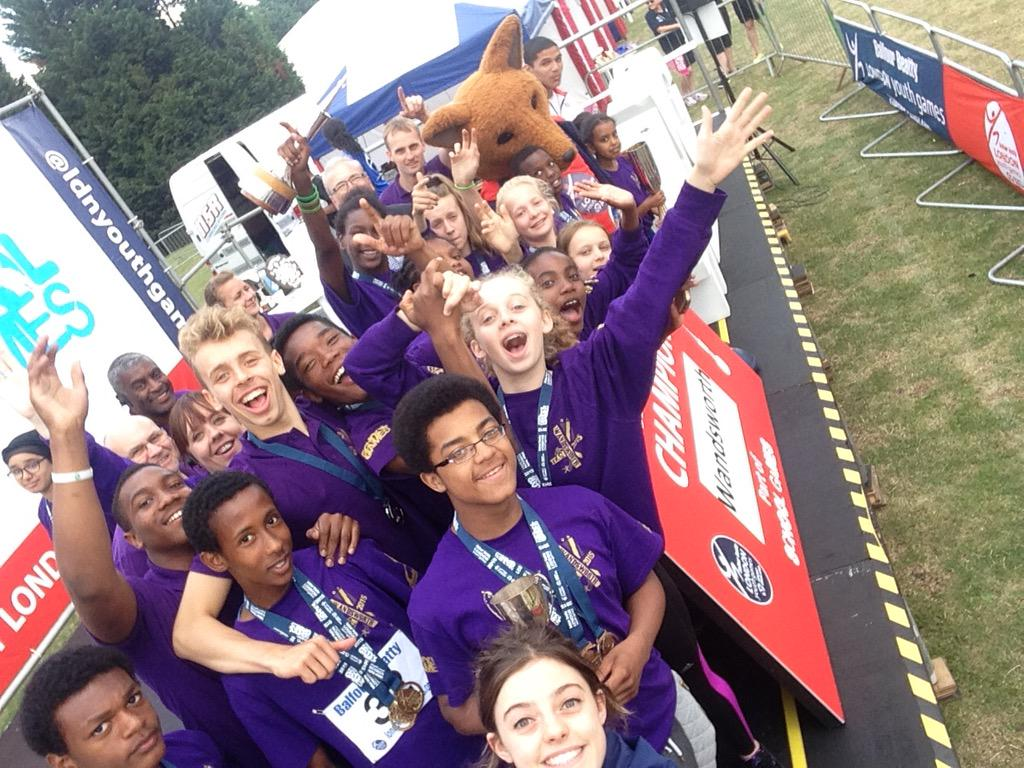
Wandsworth celebrate a hat-trick of Jubilee Trophy wins in 2015

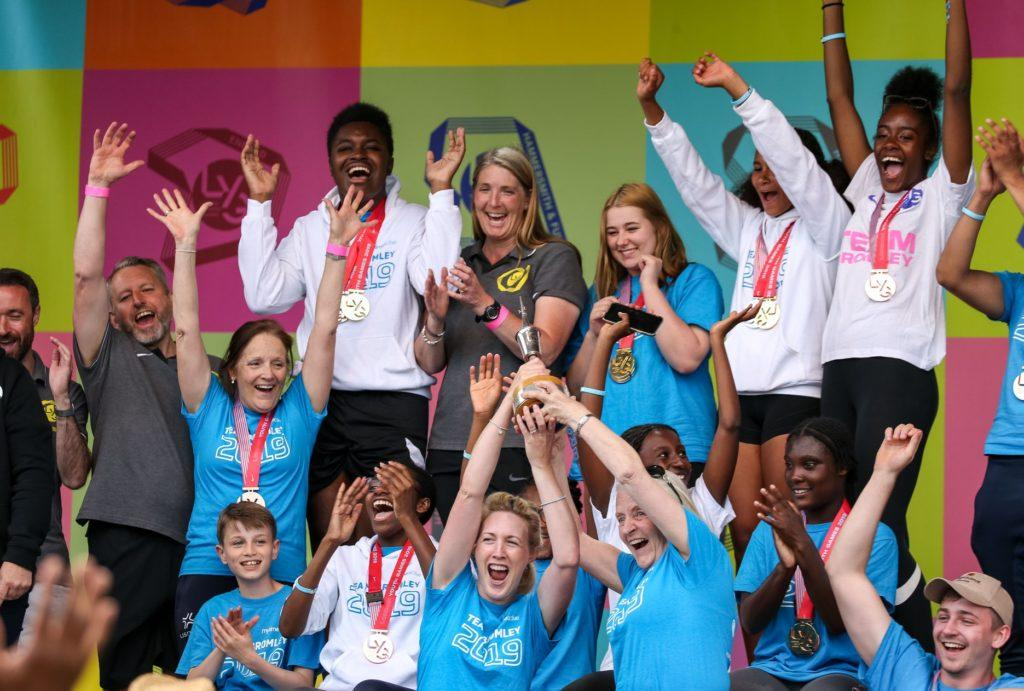
Bromley celebrate winning the Jubilee Trophy in 2019
