= Morgan Jarvis =

Canadian rower

Personal information
- Born: January 9, 1983 (age 43) Winnipeg, Manitoba
- Height: 1.82 m (5 ft 11 1/2 in)
- Weight: 72 kg (159 lb)
Medal record
Men's rowing
Representing Canada
World Rowing Championships
Bronze medal – third place	2005 Kaizu	Lightweight quadruple sculls
World Rowing U23 Championships
Bronze medal – third place	2004 Poznań	Lightweight double sculls
Bronze medal – third place	2005 Amsterdam	Lightweight double sculls

Morgan Jarvis (born January 9, 1983) is a Canadian rower. He participated in the 2012 Summer Olympics in London where he competed in the Men's lightweight double sculls event together with his teammate Douglas Vandor. They qualified for the C finals, where they reached a second place, finishing in 14th place overall.
