= Mohamed Nofel =

Egyptian rower

Personal information
- Nationality: Egyptian
- Born: 15 November 1984 (age 40); El Mahalla El Kubra, Egypt

Sport
- Sport: Rowing

Mohamed Nofel (born 15 November 1984) is an Egyptian rower. He competed in the men's lightweight double sculls event at the 2012 Summer Olympics.
