= Omar Al-Sabahi =

Egyptian rower

Personal information
- Nationality: Egyptian
- Born: 24 June 1977 (age 47); Giza, Egypt

Sport
- Sport: Rowing

Omar Al-Sabahi (born 24 June 1977) is an Egyptian rower. He competed in the men's lightweight double sculls event at the 2012 Summer Olympics.
