= Linus Lichtschlag =

German rower

Personal information
- Born: 4 September 1988 (age 36)
- Height: 1.88 m (6 ft 2 in)
- Weight: 72 kg (159 lb)

Sport
- Country: Germany
- Sport: Rowing
- Event: Men's lightweight double sculls
- Club: Ruderclub am Wannsee

Linus Lichtschlag (born 4 September 1988, Berlin) is a German rower. He participated in the 2012 Summer Olympics in London where he competed in the Men's lightweight double sculls event together with his teammate Lars Hartig. They qualified for the A finals, where they reached a sixth place. The team had previously won gold at the 2010 European Championships in the same event.
