= Zac Purchase =

English rower

Zac Purchase MBE
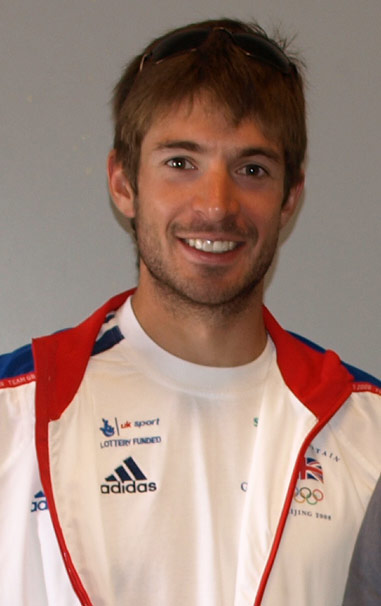

Personal information
- National team: Team GB
- Citizenship: British
- Born: Zachary Jake Nicholas Purchase; 2 May 1986 (age 40) Cheltenham, Gloucestershire, England
- Height: 6 ft 1 in (1.85 m)
- Weight: 11 st (70 kg)
- Spouse: Felicity Purchase-Hill (2012–present)
- Website: ZacPurchase.com

Sport
- Country: Great Britain
- Sport: Men's rowing
- Event: Lightweight Double Sculls
- Club: Marlow Rowing Club, Upton Rowing Club, Evesham Rowing Club
Medal record
Representing Great Britain
Men's rowing
Olympic Games
Gold medal – first place	2008 Beijing	Lightweight Double Sculls
Silver medal – second place	2012 London	Lightweight Double Sculls
World Championships
Gold medal – first place	2006 Eton	Lightweight Single Sculls
Gold medal – first place	2010 Karapiro	Lightweight Double Sculls
Gold medal – first place	2011 Bled	Lightweight Double Sculls
Silver medal – second place	2005 Gifu	Lightweight Single Sculls
Bronze medal – third place	2007 Munich	Lightweight Double Sculls

Zachary Jake Nicholas Purchase-Hill MBE (born 2 May 1986) is a retired English rower.

Purchase won an Olympic gold medal at the 2008 Summer Olympics in Beijing and a silver medal at the 2012 Summer Olympics in London. Both medals were won in the Lightweight Men's Double Sculls. He has also won three gold, one silver and a bronze at the World Rowing Championships.

== Early life and education ==
Purchase was born in Cheltenham to Nicholas Purchase and Sara Holyer on 2 May 1986. Originally a competitive swimmer, Purchase started rowing in 1999 whilst a pupil at the King's School, Worcester. Whilst at school, he also passed Grade 8 on the Saxophone with a Merit.

Following school, Purchase joined the British Rowing team as a Junior rower.

== Rowing career ==
His main discipline was sculling with the majority of his international medals being won in the Lightweight Men's Double Scull with Mark Hunter.

In 2002, Purchase won his first international medals, a gold and silver at the Coupe de la Jeunesse and competed at the World Rowing Junior Championships the following two years. In 2003, aged 17, Purchase won the Fawley Challenge Cup at Henley Royal Regatta.

in 2005, Purchase competed at the World Rowing U23 Championships in Amsterdam where he won a gold medal. He entered the Senior World Rowing Championships three weeks later and won a silver medal. Both medals were achieved in the Lightweight Men's Single Scull.

By 2006, Purchase was a full-time member of the senior British Rowing, based in Caversham, Berkshire. The same year saw him suffer a ligament injury in his left wrist, which stopped him training between January – May. Regardless of this, his competed at the World Rowing Championships in Eton, Berkshire that summer and won his first World Championship title, achieving a World Record in the Lightweight Men's Single Scull.

Following his success in 2006, Purchase moved to the Lightweight Men's Double Scull in order to train for the 2008 Summer Olympics. Purchase achieved a bronze medal with Hunter in this category at the 2007 World Rowing Championships in Munich, Germany.

In 2008, Purchase won both the Olympic gold medal at the 2008 Summer Olympics in Beijing and the World Rowing Cup.

Purchase won another two gold medals at the 2010 and 2011 World Rowing Championships, in New Zealand and Slovenia respectively.

He won his second Olympic medal (silver) at the 2012 Summer Olympics in London.

== Life after rowing ==
Since retiring from rowing, Purchase has taken part in a number of public events and TV shows, including Who Wants To Be A Millionaire, Friday Night with Jonathan Ross, Ready Steady Cook, Three Men in a Boat and A Question of Sport.

On 27 November 2008, Zac Purchase officially named an eight rowing boat at The King's School, Worcester in honour of his Olympic Gold Medal win.

He regularly gives motivational speeches and hosts away days for businesses, schools and charities. He is also a qualified Personal Trainer.

== Personal life ==
Purchase was appointed Member of the Order of the British Empire (MBE) in the 2009 New Year Honours for services to sport and collected his award in June of that year.

Purchase married long-term partner Felicity Purchase-Hill (née Hill), also a former pupil and rower at the King's School, Worcester, shortly after the 2012 Summer Olympics at St Paul's Cathedral in London. The wedding was covered by Hello. They have two daughters, born in 2015 & 2018.

== Achievements ==
=== Olympics ===
- 2012 London – Silver, Lightweight Double Scull (bow)
- 2008 Beijing – Gold, Lightweight Double Scull (bow)

=== World Championships ===
- 2011 Bled – Gold, Lightweight Double Scull (bow) with Mark Hunter
- 2010 Lake Karapiro – Gold, Lightweight Double Scull (bow)
- 2007 Munich – Bronze, Lightweight Double Scull (bow)
- 2006 Eton – Gold, Lightweight Single Scull
- 2005 Gifu – Silver, Lightweight Single Scull
- 2005 Amsterdam – Gold, Lightweight Single Scull (U23 World Championships)

=== World Cups ===
- 2012 Belgrade – Gold, Lightweight Double Scull (bow)
- 2010 Bled – Gold, Lightweight Single Scull
- 2008 Poznań – Gold, Lightweight Double Scull (bow)
- 2008 Lucerne – Gold, Lightweight Double Scull (bow)
- 2008 Munich – Gold, Lightweight Double Scull (bow)
- 2007 Lucerne – Bronze, Lightweight Double Scull (bow)
- 2007 Amsterdam – Silver, Lightweight Double Scull (bow)
- 2007 Linz – Silver, Lightweight Double Scull (bow)
- 2006 Lucerne – Gold, Lightweight Single Scull
- 2005 Munich – Silver, Lightweight Single Scull
- 2005 Eton – 4th, Lightweight Single Scull

=== World Under 23 Championships ===
- 2005 Amsterdam – Gold, Lightweight Single Scull

=== GB Rowing Team Senior Trials ===
- 2011 – 1st, Lightweight Single Scull
- 2010 – 1st, Lightweight Single Scull
- 2007 – 1st, Lightweight Single Scull

=== 2009 New Years Honours ===
- MBE, Services to Sport
