= Fabiana Beltrame =

Brazilian rower (born 1982)

Personal information
- Born: 9 April 1982 (age 44) Florianópolis, Brazil

Sport
- Sport: Rowing
Medal record
Women's rowing
Representing Brazil
World Rowing Championships
| Gold medal – first place | 2011 Bled | LW1x |
Pan American Games
| Silver medal – second place | 2011 Guadalajara | Lwt single sculls |
| Silver medal – second place | 2015 Toronto | Lwt single sculls |
South American Games
| Gold medal – first place | 2010 Medellín | Double sculls |
| Gold medal – first place | 2014 Santiago | Single sculls |
| Silver medal – second place | 2010 Medellín | Quadruple sculls |
| Silver medal – second place | 2010 Medellín | Pair |
| Silver medal – second place | 2014 Santiago | Lwt single sculls |

Fabiana Beltrame (born 9 April 1982) is a former Brazilian rower. She has competed at the 2004 and 2008 Summer Olympics in the single scull, and 2012 Summer Olympics in the double sculls (with Luana De Assis). She won the 2011 World Rowing Championships in Bled, Slovenia, and competes in the Lightweight class.
