= Yunior Pérez =

Cuban rower (born 1981)

Personal information
- Born: 10 July 1981 (age 44) Cauto Cristo, Cuba

Sport
- Sport: Rowing
Medal record
Representing Cuba
Pan American Games
Gold medal – first place	2003 Santo Domingo	Lightweight double sculls
Gold medal – first place	2003 Santo Domingo	Quadruple sculls
Gold medal – first place	2007 Rio de Janeiro	Lightweight double sculls
Silver medal – second place	2011 Guadalajara	Lightweight double sculls
Bronze medal – third place	2007 Rio de Janeiro	Coxless fours
Central American and Caribbean Games
Silver medal – second place	2006 Cartagena	Lightweight double sculls

Yunior Pérez Aguilera (born 10 July 1981) is a Cuban rower. He competed at the 2008 Summer Olympics and the 2012 Summer Olympics.
