= Lucia Palermo =

Argentine rower

Personal information
- Born: 30 September 1985 (age 40) Vicente López, Buenos Aires, Argentina

Sport
- Sport: Rowing
Medal record
Women's rowing
Representing Argentina
Pan American Games
Bronze medal – third place	2007 Rio de Janeiro	Quadruple sculls
Bronze medal – third place	2015 Toronto	Lightweight single sculls
South American Games
Gold medal – first place	2010 Medellin	Quadruple sculls

Lucia Fernanda Palermo (born 30 September 1985) is an Argentine rower. At the 2004 Olympics, she competed in the women's lightweight sculls with Milka Kraljev, finishing in 17th place. She competed in the single sculls race at the 2012 Summer Olympics and placed 3rd in Final D and 21st overall.

At the 2012 South American Rowing Championships, she and Maria Gabriela Best won the women's double sculls.
