= Mario Cejas =

Argentine rower (born 1977)

Personal information
- Born: 28 August 1977 (age 48) Santa Fe, Argentina
- Height: 1.83 m (6 ft 0 in)
- Weight: 75 kg (165 lb)

Sport
- Country: Argentina
- Sport: Rowing
- Event: Men's lightweight double sculls
Medal record
Men's rowing
Representing Argentina
Pan American Games
Gold medal – first place	1999 Winnipeg	Lwt quadruple sculls

Mario Cejas (born 28 August 1977 in Santa Fe) is an Argentine rower. He participated in the 2012 Summer Olympics in London where he competed in the Men's lightweight double sculls event together with his teammate Miguel Mayol. They qualified for the C finals, where they reached a fifth place, finishing in 17th place overall.
