= José Güipe =

Venezuelan rower (born 1988)

Personal information
- Full name: José Güipe Jiménez
- Nationality: Venezuela
- Born: 10 December 1988 (age 37) Sucre, Venezuela
- Height: 1.77 m (5 ft 10 in)
- Weight: 70 kg (150 lb)

Sport
- Sport: Rowing
Medal record
Representing Venezuela
Pan American Games
Bronze medal – third place	2011 Guadalajara	Double sculls
Central American and Caribbean Games
Bronze medal – third place	2014 Veracruz	Double sculls
Bronze medal – third place	2014 Veracruz	Lightweight double sculls
Bronze medal – third place	2014 Veracruz	Quadruple sculls

José Güipe Jiménez (born 10 December 1988) is a Venezuelan rower. He competed in the 2020 Summer Olympics.
