= Miguel Mayol =

Argentine rower (born 1981)

Personal information
- Born: 18 May 1981 (age 44); Zárate, Argentina
- Height: 1.78 m (5 ft 10 in)
- Weight: 73 kg (161 lb)

Sport
- Country: Argentina
- Sport: Rowing
- Event: Men's lightweight double sculls

Miguel Mayol (born 18 May 1981) is an Argentine rower. He participated in the 2012 Summer Olympics in London where he competed in the Men's lightweight double sculls event together with his teammate Mario Cejas. They qualified for the C finals, where they reached a fifth place, finishing in 17th place overall.
