= Emiliano Dumestre =

Uruguayan rower (born 1987)

Personal information
- Full name: Emiliano Dumestre Guaraglia
- Nationality: Uruguay
- Born: 11 February 1987 (age 39) Colonia del Sacramento, Uruguay
- Height: 1.86 m (6 ft 1 in)
- Weight: 70 kg (154 lb)

Sport
- Sport: Rowing
- Coached by: Ruben Scarpatti (national)
Medal record
Men's rowing
Representing Uruguay
South American Games
Gold medal – first place	2010 Medellín	Double sculls
Silver medal – second place	2010 Medellín	Quadruple sculls

Emiliano Dumestre Guaraglia (born February 11, 1987, in Colonia del Sacramento) is a Uruguayan rower. He is a two-time medalist in the men's double and quadruple sculls at the 2010 South American Games in Medellín.

Dumestre represented Uruguay at the 2012 Summer Olympics in London, where he and his partner Rodolfo Collazo finished fourth in the C-final, and sixteenth overall in the men's lightweight double sculls, with a time of 6:51.94.

Dumestre is a graduate of agricultural studies at Universidad de la Empresa Business School in Montevideo.
