= Rodolfo Collazo =

Uruguayan rower (born 1983)

Personal information
- Full name: Rodolfo Anibal Collazo Tourn
- Born: 26 April 1983 (age 43) Colonia del Sacramento, Uruguay
- Height: 1.77 m (5 ft 9 1/2 in)
- Weight: 71 kg (157 lb)

Sport
- Sport: Men's rowing
- Club: Colonia Rowing Club
Medal record
Men's rowing
Representing Uruguay
Pan American Games
Silver medal – second place	2003 Santo Domingo	Quadruple sculls
South American Games
Gold medal – first place	2006 Buenos Aires	Quadruple sculls
Gold medal – first place	2010 Medellín	Double sculls
Silver medal – second place	2002 Rio de Janeiro	Quadruple sculls
Silver medal – second place	2006 Buenos Aires	Double sculls
Silver medal – second place	2010 Medellín	Quadruple sculls
Bronze medal – third place	2006 Buenos Aires	Quadruple sculls

Rodolfo Collazo Tourn (born 26 April 1983 in Colonia del Sacramento) is a Uruguayan competition rower.

He competed in three Summer Olympics for his native South American country: 2004, 2008 and 2012, and in three Pan American Games: 2003, 2007 and 2011.

He was also named Uruguay's flagbearer for the 2012 Summer Olympics.

Olympic Games
Preceded by Alejandro Foglia	Flagbearer for Uruguay; London 2012	Succeeded by Dolores Moreira
