= Tennis at the 2008 Summer Olympics – Qualification =

Qualification
- Tennis at the 2008 Summer Olympics

Events
Singles	men	women
Doubles	men	women
Qualification
- Summer Olympics

Qualification for tennis at the 2008 Summer Olympics in Beijing, China was determined not by any form of qualifying tournament, but by the rankings maintained by the Association of Tennis Professionals (ATP) and the Women's Tennis Association (WTA).

== Qualifying criteria ==
The main qualifying criteria were the ATP and WTA ranking lists as of June 9, 2008. The players entering were formally submitted by the International Tennis Federation (ITF). The ATP and WTA rankings were based on performances from the previous 52 weeks, and there were several tournaments, including the 2008 Wimbledon Championships, in the two-month period between the time of the rankings being frozen for entry, and the beginning of the tennis events at the Olympics. This led one player, Rainer Schüttler, who rose the ATP rankings considerably in that time period, to successfully seek arbitration on the matter and gain entry. Another player, Tamarine Tanasugarn who was outside the ranking places that could qualify on July 9, but re-entered them, like Schuettler, gained entry; although she did so through the Tripartite Commission Invitation places after Stephanie Vogt withdrew.

Each National Olympic Committee (NOC) could enter 6 men and 6 women athletes, with a maximum of 4 entries in the individual events, and 2 pairs in the doubles events. This resulted in several high-ranked players being unable to enter, despite players of lower-rank being able to. For example, Vera Zvonareva, world number 13, would not have been entered had all the Russian players ahead of her done so, and world number 21, Nadia Petrova, was unable to participate (the top four Russian women players were all in the world's top eight). In the men's, a notably high-ranked player who could not gain entry was world number 20 Fernando Verdasco of Spain. However, any player in the world's top 56 was eligible, and NOC's had the option to enter players of a lower rank. Athletes were able to compete in both single and doubles events.

Singles:

- 56 players directly qualified for the singles event based on the recognised World Ranking of 9 June 2008. Any player qualified for the singles event was automatically eligible for entry in the doubles event.
- 2 Invitation places in each singles event were allocated by the Tripartite Commission.
- 6 final qualification places in the singles event were allocated by the ITF based on the recognised World Ranking and the continental/NOC representation.

Doubles:

- 10 players directly qualified for the doubles event based on the recognised World Ranking of 9 June 2008.
- Final qualification places were allocated by the ITF to doubles players based on the recognised World Ranking and the continental/NOC representation, until a total of 86 places have been allocated.

The ITF places were allocated by the ITF, based on recognized world ranking and continental/NOC participation.

== Summary ==
A total of 48 nations were represented by at least one player in either the men's singles, women's singles, men's doubles, or women's doubles.

Nation	Men		Women		Total
Nation	Singles	Doubles	Singles	Doubles	Total
Argentina	4	4	1	2(1)	6
Australia	2	4(2)	3	4(1)	8
Austria	1	2(1)	1		3
Bahamas	1	2(1)			2
Belarus	1		2	4(2)	5
Belgium	2	2			2
Brazil	2	2(2)			4
Bulgaria			1		1
Canada	2	2(1)			3
Chile	2	2			2
China	3	2	4	4(1)	8
Chinese Taipei	1		1	2(1)	3
Croatia	1				1
Czech Republic	4	4(2)	4	4(1)	11
Denmark			1		1
Ecuador	1				1
El Salvador	1				1
Estonia			2	2	2
Finland	1				1
France	4	4(1)	3	4(1)	9
Germany	2	2			2
Great Britain	1	2(1)			2
Greece			1	2(1)	2
Hungary			1	2(1)	2
India		2(2)	1	2(1)	4
Israel		2(2)	2	2	4
Italy	3	2	4	4(1)	8
Japan	1		2	2	3
Latvia	1				1
New Zealand			1		1
Poland		2(2)	2	4(2)	6
Romania	1		1		2
Russia	4	4	4	4(1)	9
Serbia	2	2(1)	1		4
Slovakia	1		2	2(1)	4
South Africa	1	2(1)			2
South Korea	1				1
Spain	4	4	4	4(1)	9
Sweden	3	4(1)	1		5
Switzerland	2	2	2	2(1)	5
Thailand			1		1
Togo	1				1
Tunisia			1		1
Ukraine			4	4	4
United States	3	4(2)	3	4(2)	10
Uzbekistan			1		1
Venezuela			1		1
Zimbabwe			1		1
Total: 48 NOCs	64	64(22)	64	64(20)	170

- Number in brackets = players participating only in doubles

== Qualifiers ==
=== Men's singles ===
No.	Rank	Player	NOC
World Ranking
1	1	Roger Federer	Switzerland
2	2	Rafael Nadal	Spain
3	3	Novak Djokovic	Serbia
4	4	Nikolay Davydenko	Russia
5	5	David Ferrer	Spain
—	6	Andy Roddick	United States
6	7	James Blake	United States
7	8	David Nalbandian	Argentina
8	9	Stanislas Wawrinka	Switzerland
—	10	Richard Gasquet	France
9	11	Andy Murray	Great Britain
10	12	Tomáš Berdych	Czech Republic
11	13	Nicolás Almagro	Spain
—	14	Jo-Wilfried Tsonga	France
12	15	Fernando González	Chile
13	16	Radek Štěpánek	Czech Republic
14	17	Paul-Henri Mathieu	France
15	18	Mikhail Youzhny	Russia
16	19	Tommy Robredo	Spain
—	20	Fernando Verdasco	Spain
17	21	Juan Mónaco	Argentina
—	22	Ivo Karlović	Croatia
—	23	Marcos Baghdatis	Cyprus
—	24	Juan Carlos Ferrero	Spain
18	25	Jarkko Nieminen	Finland
—	26	Carlos Moyá	Spain
—	27	Ivan Ljubičić	Croatia
19	28	Gilles Simon	France
20	29	Dmitry Tursunov	Russia
21	30	Lleyton Hewitt	Australia
22	31	Andreas Seppi	Italy
23	32	Gaël Monfils	France
—	33	Feliciano López	Spain
24	34	Igor Andreev	Russia
25	35	Michaël Llodra	France
—	36	Mardy Fish	United States
—	37	Tommy Haas	Germany
26	38	Nicolas Kiefer	Germany
27	39	Janko Tipsarević	Serbia
—	40	Philipp Kohlschreiber	Germany
28	41	Sam Querrey	United States
29	42	Robin Söderling	Sweden
—	43	Julien Benneteau	France
—	44	Mario Ančić	Croatia
—	45	Juan Ignacio Chela	Argentina
—	46	Nicolas Mahut	France
30	47	Simone Bolelli	Italy
31	48	Guillermo Cañas	Argentina
32	49	Agustín Calleri	Argentina
—	50	José Acasuso	Argentina
33	51	Ernests Gulbis	Latvia
—	52	Fabrice Santoro	France
34	53	Steve Darcis	Belgium
—	54	Marcel Granollers	Spain
35	55	Lee Hyung-Taik	South Korea
36	56	Marin Čilić	Croatia
—	57	Marc Gicquel	France
37	58	Potito Starace	Italy
38	59	Robby Ginepri	United States
—	60	Sébastien Grosjean	France
—	61	Eduardo Schwank	Argentina
—	62	Robin Haase	Netherlands
39	63	Nicolás Lapentti	Ecuador
—	64	Juan Martín del Potro	Argentina
—	65	Dudi Sela	Israel
—	66	Denis Gremelmayr	Germany
40	67	Olivier Rochus	Belgium
41	68	Thomaz Bellucci	Brazil
42	69	Thomas Johansson	Sweden
—	70	Albert Montañés	Spain
43	70^{PR(289)}	Dominik Hrbatý	Slovakia
44	71	Ivo Minář	Czech Republic
45	72	Victor Hănescu	Romania
46	73	Lu Yen-Hsun	Chinese Taipei
—	74	Stefan Koubek	Austria
47	75	Marcos Daniel	Brazil
—	76	Marat Safin	Russia
—	77	Florent Serra	France
—	78	Igor Kunitsyn	Russia
48	79	Chris Guccione	Australia
—	80	Santiago Ventura	Spain
49	81	Jürgen Melzer	Austria
50	82	Jiří Vaněk	Czech Republic
—	83	Michael Berrer	Germany
—	84	John Isner	United States
—	85	Evgeny Korolev	Russia
—	86	Arnaud Clément	France
—	87	Martín Vassallo Argüello	Argentina
—	88	Donald Young	United States
51	89	Rainer Schüttler	Germany
52	90	Frank Dancevic	Canada
53	248	Frédéric Niemeyer	Canada
54	570	Zeng Shao-Xuan	China
55	605	Yu Xinyuan	China
56	936	Devin Mullings	Bahamas
ITF places
57	98	Kevin Anderson	South Africa
58	103	Kei Nishikori	Japan
59	128	Jonas Björkman	Sweden
60	131	Nicolás Massú	Chile
61	300	Max Mirnyi	Belarus
62	489	Sun Peng	China
Tripartite Commission Invitation
63	438	Komlavi Loglo	Togo
64	447	Rafael Arevalo	El Salvador

PR Protected/Special Ranking

Rankings as at 9 June 2008

==== Schüttler entry controversy ====
On August 4, 2008, German player Rainer Schüttler was granted an exceptional entry into the tournament, despite not having qualified under the original criteria, after having taken his campaign to play at the games to the Court of Arbitration for Sport (CAS). Schuettler, who was an alternate for Denis Gremelmayr, was ranked outside the qualifying places on June 9, when the players entered for the Games, based upon the ATP rankings of that date, were announced by the ITF. Schüttler then went on to the 2008 Wimbledon Championships, where he reached the semi-finals, elevating his ranking from No. 94 to No. 31 in the world. Germany had received one place in the men's singles, based upon the rankings of June 9, although several players withdrew before the Games. Schüttler was subsequently selected by the German Olympic Committee (Deutscher Olympischer Sportbund, DOS), in spite of the regulations set out by the International Tennis Federation (ITF), under which he was designated as an alternate. On August 3, Schüttler took his case to CAS, who the next day ruled in his favour, saying that it was in compliance with the ITF's rules, and asserting that there was an understanding that the decision over which player could be entered would be delegated to the relevant National Olympic Committee. The ITF delivered a hostile response to the decision by CAS, claiming the DOS was ignorant, and admonishing Schüttler's actions — "While recognising the German NOC may not understand how professional tennis works, there is no excuse for Mr Schuettler, who is prepared to take a place earned by his compatriot Denis Gremelmayr and of next alternate Michael Berrer."

=== Women's singles ===
No.	Rank	Player	NOC
World Ranking
—	1	Ana Ivanovic	Serbia
—	2	Maria Sharapova	Russia
1	3	Jelena Janković	Serbia
2	4	Svetlana Kuznetsova	Russia
3	5	Elena Dementieva	Russia
4	6	Serena Williams	United States
5	7	Venus Williams	United States
—	8	Anna Chakvetadze	Russia
6	9	Dinara Safina	Russia
—	10	Marion Bartoli	France
7	11	Daniela Hantuchová	Slovakia
8	12	Patty Schnyder	Switzerland
9	13	Vera Zvonareva	Russia
10	14	Agnieszka Radwańska	Poland
11	15	Ágnes Szávay	Hungary
12	16	Victoria Azarenka	Belarus
13	17	Alizé Cornet	France
14	18	Francesca Schiavone	Italy
15	19	Nicole Vaidišová	Czech Republic
—	20	Tatiana Golovin	France
—	21	Nadia Petrova	Russia
16	22	Flavia Pennetta	Italy
—	23	Maria Kirilenko	Russia
—	24	Katarina Srebotnik	Slovenia
17	25	Shahar Pe'er	Israel
—	26	Lindsay Davenport	United States
18	27	Virginie Razzano	France
—	27^{PR(NR)}	Mary Pierce	France
19	28	Sybille Bammer	Austria
20	29	Alona Bondarenko	Ukraine
—	30	Amélie Mauresmo	France
21	31	Dominika Cibulková	Slovakia
22	32	Caroline Wozniacki	Denmark
23	33	Sania Mirza	India
24	34	Kaia Kanepi	Estonia
25	35	Anabel Medina Garrigues	Spain
26	35^{PR(153)}	Mara Santangelo	Italy
27	36	Olga Govortsova	Belarus
28	36^{PR(162)}	Samantha Stosur	Australia
29	37	Eleni Daniilidou	Greece
30	38	Ai Sugiyama	Japan
—	39	Karin Knapp	Italy
31	40	Tsvetana Pironkova	Bulgaria
32	41	Casey Dellacqua	Australia
33	42	Gisela Dulko	Argentina
34	43	Yan Zi	China
—	44	Elena Vesnina	Russia
35	45	Li Na	China
—	46	Alisa Kleybanova	Russia
36	47	Lucie Šafářová	Czech Republic
37	48	Iveta Benešová	Czech Republic
38	49	Carla Suárez Navarro	Spain
39	50^{PR(158)}	Milagros Sequera	Venezuela
40	50	Peng Shuai	China
41	51	Klára Zakopalová	Czech Republic
—	52	Petra Cetkovská	Czech Republic
—	53	Michaëlla Krajicek	Netherlands
42	54	Akgul Amanmuradova	Uzbekistan
—	55	Tamira Paszek	Austria
43	56	Pauline Parmentier	France
44	57	Sofia Arvidsson	Sweden
—	58	Vera Dushevina	Russia
—	59	Aravane Rezaï	France
—	60	Petra Kvitová	Czech Republic
45	60^{PR(133)}	Zheng Jie	China
46	61	Sara Errani	Italy
—	62	Ekaterina Makarova	Russia
47	63	Tatiana Perebiynis	Ukraine
48	64	Marina Erakovic	New Zealand
49	65	Marta Domachowska	Poland
50	66	Sorana Cîrstea	Romania
51	67	Timea Bacsinszky	Switzerland
52	69	Kateryna Bondarenko	Ukraine
—	70	Anastasia Rodionova	Russia
—	72	Edina Gallovits	Romania
—	73	Akiko Morigami	Japan
—	74	Ashley Harkleroad	United States
53	75	Jill Craybas	United States
54	101	Maret Ani	Estonia
55	120	Tzipora Obziler	Israel
56	140	María José Martínez Sánchez	Spain
ITF places
57	68	Mariya Koryttseva	Ukraine
58	71	Chan Yung-Jan	Chinese Taipei
59	89	Tamarine Tanasugarn	Thailand
60	102	Nuria Llagostera Vives	Spain
61	105	Ayumi Morita	Japan
62	115	Alicia Molik	Australia
63	159	Selima Sfar	Tunisia
Tripartite Commission Invitation
—	227	Stephanie Vogt	Liechtenstein
64	NR	Cara Black	Zimbabwe

PR Protected/Special Rankings

Rankings as at 9 June 2008

=== Men's doubles ===
No.	Rank	Player A	Rank	Player B	NOC
World Ranking
1	1	Bob Bryan	1	Mike Bryan	United States
2	3	Daniel Nestor		Frédéric Niemeyer^	Canada
3	4	Nenad Zimonjić		Novak Djokovic^	Serbia
4	5	Mark Knowles		Devin Mullings^	Bahamas
5	6	Pavel Vízner		Martin Damm	Czech Republic
6	7	Jonathan Erlich	7	Andy Ram	Israel
7	9	Simon Aspelin		Thomas Johansson^	Sweden
8	10	Julian Knowle		Jürgen Melzer^	Austria
ITF places
9		Guillermo Cañas^		David Nalbandian^	Argentina
10		Agustín Calleri^		Juan Mónaco^	Argentina
11		Paul Hanley		Jordan Kerr	Australia
12		Chris Guccione^		Lleyton Hewitt^	Australia
13		Steve Darcis^		Olivier Rochus^	Belgium
14		Marcelo Melo		André Sá	Brazil
15		Fernando González^		Nicolás Massú^	Chile
16		Zeng Shao-Xuan^		Yu Xinyuan^	China
—		Marin Čilić^		Ivan Ljubičić	Croatia
17		Tomáš Berdych^		Radek Štěpánek^	Czech Republic
18		Arnaud Clément		Michaël Llodra^	France
19		Gilles Simon^		Gaël Monfils^	France
20		Nicolas Kiefer^		Rainer Schüttler^	Germany
21		Andy Murray^		Jamie Murray	Great Britain
22		Mahesh Bhupathi		Leander Paes	India
23		Simone Bolelli^		Andreas Seppi^	Italy
24		Mariusz Fyrstenberg		Marcin Matkowski	Poland
25		Igor Andreev^		Nikolay Davydenko^	Russia
26		Jeff Coetzee		Kevin Anderson^	South Africa
27		Nicolás Almagro^		David Ferrer^	Spain
28		Rafael Nadal^		Tommy Robredo^	Spain
29		Jonas Björkman^		Robin Söderling^	Sweden
30		Roger Federer^		Stanislas Wawrinka^	Switzerland
31		James Blake^		Sam Querrey^	United States
32		Dmitry Tursunov^		Mikhail Youzhny^	Russia

^ Players have also qualified to the singles tournament

=== Women's doubles ===
No.	Rank	Player A	Rank	Player B	NOC
World Ranking
—	1	Cara Black^			Zimbabwe
1	1	Liezel Huber		Lindsay Davenport	United States
2	3	Ai Sugiyama^		Ayumi Morita^	Japan
—	4	Katarina Srebotnik			Slovenia
–	5	Květa Peschke			Czech Republic
3	6	Rennae Stubbs		Samantha Stosur^	Australia
4	7	Chuang Chia-Jung	8	Chan Yung-Jan^	Chinese Taipei
5	9	Victoria Azarenka^		Tatiana Poutchek	Belarus
6	10	Dinara Safina^		Svetlana Kuznetsova^	Russia
ITF places
7		Gisela Dulko^		Betina Jozami	Argentina
8		Casey Dellacqua^		Alicia Molik^	Australia
9		Olga Govortsova^		Darya Kustova	Belarus
10		Yan Zi^		Zheng Jie^	China
11		Sun Tiantian		Peng Shuai^	China
12		Nicole Vaidišová^		Iveta Benešová^	Czech Republic
13		Petra Kvitová		Lucie Šafářová^	Czech Republic
14		Maret Ani^		Kaia Kanepi^	Estonia
15		Pauline Parmentier^		Tatiana Golovin	France
16		Virginie Razzano^		Alizé Cornet^	France
17		Eleni Daniilidou^		Anna Gerasimou	Greece
18		Ágnes Szávay^		Gréta Arn	Hungary
19		Sania Mirza^		Sunitha Rao	India
20		Shahar Pe'er^		Tzipora Obziler^	Israel
21		Mara Santangelo^		Roberta Vinci	Italy
22		Flavia Pennetta^		Francesca Schiavone^	Italy
23		Agnieszka Radwańska^		Marta Domachowska^	Poland
24		Klaudia Jans		Alicja Rosolska	Poland
25		Elena Vesnina		Vera Zvonareva^	Russia
26		Daniela Hantuchová^		Janette Husárová	Slovakia
27		Anabel Medina Garrigues^		Virginia Ruano Pascual	Spain
28		Nuria Llagostera Vives^		María José Martínez Sánchez^	Spain
29		Patty Schnyder^		Emmanuelle Gagliardi	Switzerland
30		Alona Bondarenko^		Kateryna Bondarenko^	Ukraine
31		Mariya Koryttseva^		Tatiana Perebiynis^	Ukraine
32		Serena Williams^		Venus Williams^	United States

^ Players have also qualified to the singles tournament
