= Cycling at the 2008 Summer Olympics – Men's cross-country =

Men's cross-country at the Games of the XXIX Olympiad
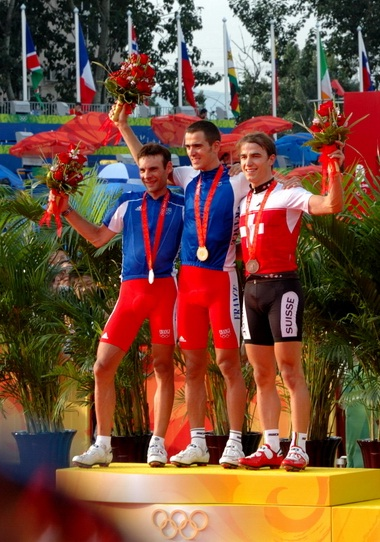
- Venue: Laoshan Mountain Bike Course
- Dates: August 23, 2008
- Competitors: 50 from 33 nations
- Winning time: 1:55:59

Medalists
1st place, gold medalist(s)		Julien Absalon; France
2nd place, silver medalist(s)		Jean-Christophe Péraud; France
3rd place, bronze medalist(s)		Nino Schurter; Switzerland

The men's cross-country mountain biking at the 2008 Summer Olympics took place at the Laoshan Mountain Bike Course on August 23, 2008.

France's Julien Absalon pulled away from a pack of mountain bikers at the start to defend his Olympic title in the event with a gold-medal time in 1:55:59. Absalon also enjoyed his teammate Jean-Christophe Péraud taking home the silver in 1:57:06, as the Frenchmen climbed on top of the podium with a spectacular 1–2 finish. Meanwhile, Switzerland's Nino Schurter delivered an exciting sprint challenge for the bronze in 1:57:52, edging out his teammate, three-time Olympian and reigning world champion Christoph Sauser by two seconds. Among the 50 mountain bikers who competed in the cross-country race, only twenty-eight of them managed to complete the full distance.

== Competition format ==
The competition began at 15:00 with a mass-start in which riders are positioned according to their current world ranking so that the higher-ranked riders are near the front. The cross-country race also involved eight laps, with 172 m of elevation change for each, around the 4.45 km course at Laoshan Mountain Bike Course. The overall distance of the race was 35.60 km.

== Schedule ==
All times are China standard time (UTC+8)

Date	Time	Round
Saturday, 23 August 2008	15:00	Final

== Results ==
Rank	Rider	Country	Time
1st place, gold medalist(s)	Julien Absalon	France	1:55:59
2nd place, silver medalist(s)	Jean-Christophe Péraud	France	1:57:06
3rd place, bronze medalist(s)	Nino Schurter	Switzerland	1:57:52
4	Christoph Sauser	Switzerland	1:57:54
5	Marco Aurelio Fontana	Italy	1:59:59
6	Christoph Soukup	Austria	2:00:11
7	Liam Killeen	Great Britain	2:00:14
8	Iñaki Lejarreta	Spain	2:00:21
9	Sven Nys	Belgium	2:01:00
10	José Antonio Hermida	Spain	2:01:01
11	Manuel Fumic	Germany	2:01:16
12	Oliver Beckingsale	Great Britain	2:01:25
13	Marek Galiński	Poland	2:01:29
14	Cédric Ravanel	France	2:01:38
15	Burry Stander	South Africa	2:01:58
16	Moritz Milatz	Germany	2:02:59
17	Fredrik Kessiakoff	Sweden	2:03:09
18	Jaroslav Kulhavý	Czech Republic	2:03:20
19	Roel Paulissen	Belgium	2:03:30
20	Geoff Kabush	Canada	2:03:55
21	Rubens Donizete	Brazil	2:05:19
22	Ji Jianhua	China	2:05:29
23	András Parti	Hungary	2:06:00
24	Kashi Leuchs	New Zealand	2:06:30
25	Jakob Fuglsang	Denmark	2:06:41
26	Héctor Páez	Colombia	2:06:46
27	Dario Alejandro Gasco	Argentina	2:07:04
28	Carlos Coloma Nicolás	Spain	2:09:05
29	Adam Craig	United States	LAP (1 lap)
30	Yader Zoli	Italy	LAP (1 lap)
31	Klaus Nielsen	Denmark	LAP (1 lap)
32	Filip Meirhaeghe	Belgium	LAP (2 laps)
33	Wolfram Kurschat	Germany	LAP (2 laps)
34	Rudi van Houts	Netherlands	LAP (2 laps)
35	Bilal Akgül	Turkey	LAP (2 laps)
36	Cristóbal Silva	Chile	LAP (2 laps)
37	Bart Brentjens	Netherlands	LAP (2 laps)
38	Emil Lindgren	Sweden	LAP (2 laps)
39	Daniel McConnell	Australia	LAP (2 laps)
40	Chan Chun Hing	Hong Kong	LAP (2 laps)
41	Yury Trofimov	Russia	LAP (2 laps)
42	Sergiy Rysenko	Ukraine	LAP (3 laps)
43	Todd Wells	United States	LAP (3 laps)
44	Seamus McGrath	Canada	LAP (3 laps)
45	Mannie Heymans	Namibia	LAP (3 laps)
46	Kohei Yamamoto	Japan	LAP (3 laps)
47	Federico Ramírez	Costa Rica	LAP (5 laps)
48	Antipass Kwari	Zimbabwe	LAP (6 laps)
	Florian Vogel	Switzerland	DNF
	Robin Seymour	Ireland	DNF
