= Bilal Akgül =

Turkish racing cyclist

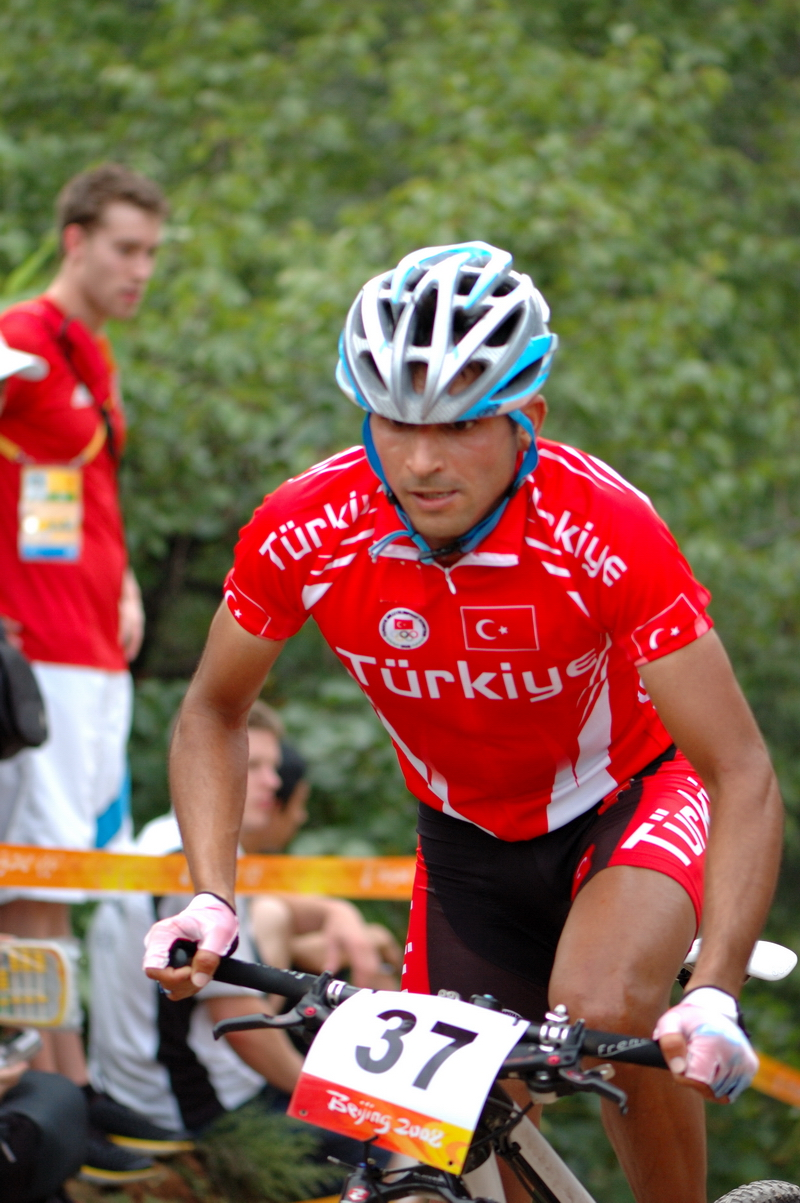
- Akgul at the men's cross-country event of 2008 Summer Olympics

Personal information
- Born: 13 October 1982 (age 44) Adana, Turkey
- Height: 1.67 m (5 ft 6 in)
- Weight: 59 kg (130 lb)

Cycling career
- Sport: Cycling
- Current team: Brisaspor, Kocaeli
- Disciplines: Road and mountain biking
- Role: Rider

Bilal Akgül (born 13 October 1982) is a Turkish professional road cyclist and mountain biker riding for team Brisaspor. He is the first ever Turkish Olympian cyclist participating at the 2008 Summer Olympics.

He became 2005 Turkish mountain biking champion in cross-country at Ankara. The next year, he won the national champion title in marathon mountain bike race at Çanakkale and the road race. In the 2007 season, Akgül became national mountain biking champion in cross-country and in marathon. He took part at the cross-country event of 2008 Summer Olympics without having finished.

== Major results ==
2005
Turkey 1st, Kırıkkale MTB Cup, Mountainbike, Elite/U23, Kırıkkale
Greece 2nd, Kos Cup, Mountainbike, Elite/U23, Kos
Turkey 1st, Bolu Festival MTB, Mountainbike, Elite/U23, Bolu
Turkey 1st, Kartepe XCO Cup, Mountainbike, Elite/U23, Kocaeli
Turkey 1st, National Championship, Mountainbike, XC, Elite, Ankara
Turkey 1st, Bursa MTB Cup, Mountainbike, Elite/U23, Bursa
Turkey 1st, İzmir XCO Cup, Mountainbike, Elite/U23, İzmir
Turkey 1st, Babadagi Hill Climb, Mountainbike, Elite/U23, Fethiye
Turkey 1st, Yalova Aksa XCO Cup, Mountainbike, Elite/U23, Yalova

2006
Turkey 1st, Adana MTB Cup, Mountainbike, Elite/U23, Adana
Turkey 3rd, Manavgat, Mountainbike-Marathon, Antalya
Turkey 1st, Gallipoli MTB Cup, Mountainbike, Elite/U23, Çanakkale
Turkey 2nd, Istanbul Cup, Mountainbike, Elite/U23, Istanbul
Turkey 1st, National Championship, Road, Elite
Turkey 2nd, Konya MTB Cup, Mountainbike, Elite/U23, Konya
Turkey 3rd, Cappadocia MTB Festival, Mountainbike, Elite/U23 (a), Göreme
Turkey 2nd, Cappadocia MTB Festival, Mountainbike, Elite/U23 (c), Ürgüp
Turkey 3rd, Balkan Championship XC, Mountainbike, Kartepe, Kocaeli
Turkey 2nd, Yalova Aksa XCO Cup, Mountainbike, Elite/U23, Yalova
Turkey 1st, National Championship, Mountainbike, Marathon, Çanakkale

2007
Turkey 1st, Adana MTB Cup, Mountainbike, Elite/U23, Adana
Turkey 3rd, Büyükada Cup XCO, Mountainbike, Elite/U23, Istanbul
Turkey 1st, Gaziantep, Mountainbike, Elite/U23, Gaziantep
Turkey 1st, Polonez Adampol Cup, Mountainbike, Elite/U23, Istanbul
Turkey 1st, Ankara MTB Cup, Mountainbike, Elite/U23, Ankara
Turkey 1st, National Championship, Mountainbike, XC, Elite, Ürgüp
Turkey 3rd, Kartepe XCO Cup, Mountainbike, Elite/U23, Kocaeli
Turkey 1st, İzmir XCO Cup, Mountainbike, Elite/U23, İzmir
Turkey 2nd, Yalova Aksa XCO Cup, Mountainbike, Elite/U23, Yalova
Turkey 2nd, Babadagi Hill Climb, Mountainbike, Elite/U23, Fethiye
Turkey 1st, National Championship, Mountainbike, Marathon, Çanakkale

2008
Turkey 3rd, Stage 1 Tacettin Özsavaş Cup TTT
China 35th, Olympic Games, Mountainbike, Beijing

2010
Turkey 5th, National Championship, Road, Elite, Bolu

2011
Turkey 1st, Salcano Turkish Mountainbike Championship, Istanbul/Arnavutköy

2012
Turkey 3rd, Finike/Antalya, Mountainbike
Turkey 1st, Gaziantep, Mountainbike
Bosnia and Herzegovina 1st, Tuzla, Mountainbike
Turkey 1st, Gaziantep, Mountainbike (b)
Turkey 1st, National Championship, Mountainbike, XC, Elite
