= Tennis at the 2008 Summer Olympics – Women's singles =

Women's singles
- Tennis at the 2008 Summer Olympics

Final
- Champion: Elena Dementieva (RUS)
- Runner-up: Dinara Safina (RUS)
- Score: 3–6, 7–5, 6–3

Events
Singles	men	women
Doubles	men	women
Qualification
- Summer Olympics

Women's singles tennis at the Games of the XXIX Olympiad
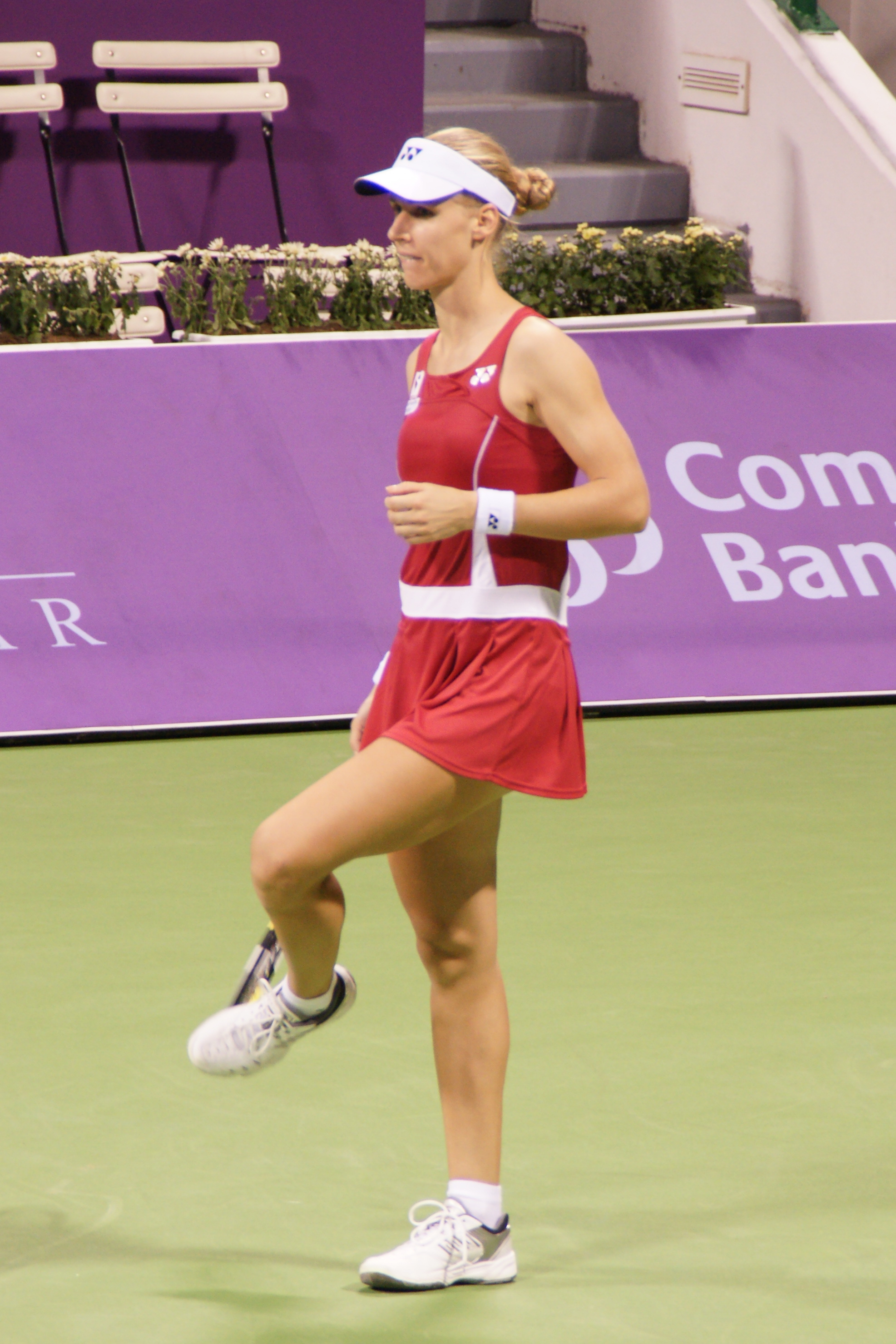
- Gold medalist Elena Dementieva (at the 2008 WTA Tour Championships)
- Venue: National Tennis Center, Beijing
- Dates: 10 to 17 August 2008
- Competitors: 64 from 33 nations

Medalists
1st place, gold medalist(s)		Elena Dementieva	Russia
2nd place, silver medalist(s)		Dinara Safina	Russia
3rd place, bronze medalist(s)		Vera Zvonareva	Russia

Russia's Elena Dementieva defeated compatriot Dinara Safina in the final, 3–6, 7–5, 6–3 to win the gold medal in women's singles tennis at the 2008 Summer Olympics. In the bronze medal match, Russia's Vera Zvonareva defeated China's Li Na 6–0, 7–5. This was the first Olympic medal sweep in tennis since 1908, when three British women won medals in the outdoor women's singles tournament. It was the fifth podium sweep in tennis in Olympic history; all previous sweeps were by British athletes. It was Russia's first victory in the women's singles. Dementieva became the third woman to win multiple Olympic singles medals, following Steffi Graf (1988 and 1992) and Arantxa Sánchez Vicario (1992 and 1996), and the first to do so in non-consecutive Games.

The tournament was held from August 10 to August 17 at the National Tennis Center in Beijing, China. The DecoTurf surface made the event a hardcourt tournament. There were 64 competitors from 33 nations.

Justine Henin was the reigning gold medalist from 2004, but she retired from the sport earlier that year.

== Background ==
This was the 11th appearance of the women's singles tennis. A women's event was held only once during the first three Games (only men's tennis was played in 1896 and 1904), but has been held at every Olympics for which there was a tennis tournament since 1908. Tennis was not a medal sport from 1928 to 1984, though there were demonstration events in 1968 and 1984.

Returning from the 2004 Games were bronze medalist Alicia Molik of Australia and quarterfinalists Francesca Schiavone of Italy, Ai Sugiyama of Japan, and Svetlana Kuznetsova of Russia. 2000 gold medalist Venus Williams (who had lost in the third round in 2004) and silver medalist Elena Dementieva (a shocking first-round loss to Molik in 2004) also returned. Venus's sister, Serena Williams, made her Olympic singles debut after withdrawing in 2004 due to injury. Reigning Olympic champion Justine Henin of Belgium had retired earlier in 2008. The #1 seed, Ana Ivanovic of Serbia, withdrew due to an injury. This left a relatively open field, with Ivanovic's countrywoman Jelena Janković, the Williams sisters, and the four Russian players (Kuznetsova, Dementieva, Dinara Safina, and Vera Zvonareva) among the top contenders.

Serbia made its (post-separation from Montenegro) debut in the event. France made its 10th appearance, most among nations to that point, having missed only the 1908 Games in London (when only British players competed).

== Qualification ==
Qualification for the women's singles was primarily through the WTA ranking list of 9 June 2008. Nations had been limited to four players in the event since the 2000 Games. There were 64 quota places available for women's singles. The first 56 were assigned through the world ranking. There were two Tripartite Commission invitation places and 6 final qualification places allocated by the ITF based on continental and national representation along with world rankings.

== Competition format ==
The competition was a single-elimination tournament with a bronze medal match. Matches were in best-of-3 sets. No tiebreak was played in the final set.

== Schedule ==
August	10	11	12	13	14	16	17
Morning	10.30	10.30	10.30				
Afternoon	17.00	17.00	17.00	16.00	16.00	16.00	16.00
	Round of 64	Round of 64	Round of 32	Round of 16	Quarterfinals	Semifinals	Bronze; Final

== Seeds ==
1. Ana Ivanovic (SRB) (withdrew because of a thumb injury)
2. Jelena Janković (SRB) (quarterfinals)
3. Svetlana Kuznetsova (RUS) (first round)
4. Serena Williams (USA) (quarterfinals)
5. Elena Dementieva (RUS) (champion, gold medalist)
6. Dinara Safina (RUS) (final, silver medalist)
7. Venus Williams (USA) (quarterfinals)
8. Agnieszka Radwańska (POL) (second round)
9. Vera Zvonareva (RUS) (semifinals, bronze medalist)
10. Daniela Hantuchová (SVK) (second round)
11. Ágnes Szávay (HUN) (first round)
12. Victoria Azarenka (BLR) (third round)
13. Patty Schnyder (SUI) (second round)
14. Flavia Pennetta (ITA) (first round)
15. Alizé Cornet (FRA) (third round)
16. Dominika Cibulková (SVK) (third round)

Click on the seed number of a player to go to their draw section.

== Draw ==
Key

- Q = Qualifier
- WC = Wild card
- LL = Lucky loser
- Alt = Alternate
- ITF = ITF entry
- PR = Protected ranking
- SR = Special ranking
- SE = Special exempt
- JE = Junior exempt
- JR = Junior Accelerator Programme entrant
- CO = College Accelerator Programme entrant
- NG = Next Gen Accelerator Program entrant
- w/o = Walkover
- r = Retired
- d = Defaulted
- INV = Tripartite Invitation
- IP = ITF place

=== Finals ===
Quarterfinals
Sybille Bammer (AUT)	3	6	3
9	Vera Zvonareva (RUS)	6	3	6
4	Serena Williams (USA)	6	4	3
5	Elena Dementieva (RUS)	3	6	6
7	Venus Williams (USA)	5	5
Li Na (CHN)	7	7
6	Dinara Safina (RUS)	6	5	6
2	Jelena Janković (SRB)	2	7	3

Semifinals
9	Vera Zvonareva (RUS)	3	6^{3}
5	Elena Dementieva (RUS)	6	7^{7}
Li Na (CHN)	6^{3}	5
6	Dinara Safina (RUS)	7^{7}	7

Final ((gold medal match))
5	Elena Dementieva (RUS)	3	7	6
6	Dinara Safina (RUS)	6	5	3
Bronze medal match
9	Vera Zvonareva (RUS)	6	7
Li Na (CHN)	0	5

=== Top half ===
==== Section 1 ====
First round
Alt	T Obziler (ISR)	7	5	4
M Koryttseva (UKR)	5	7	6
Alt	M Ani (EST)	4	2
L Šafářová (CZE)	6	6
A Medina Garrigues (ESP)	2	6	4
S Bammer (AUT)	6	4	6
J Craybas (USA)	3	2
13	P Schnyder (SUI)	6	6
9	V Zvonareva (RUS)	6	6
Z Yan (CHN)	2	0
S Pe'er (ISR)	6	5	6
S Cîrstea (ROU)	3	7	0
A Amanmuradova (UZB)	4	2
F Schiavone (ITA)	6	6
IP	Y-j Chan (TPE)	1	6^{6}
8	A Radwańska (POL)	6	7^{8}

Second round
M Koryttseva (UKR)	6	1	5
L Šafářová (CZE)	2	6	7
S Bammer (AUT)	6	6
13	P Schnyder (SUI)	4	4
9	V Zvonareva (RUS)	6	7^{7}
S Pe'er (ISR)	3	6^{4}
F Schiavone (ITA)	6	7^{8}
8	A Radwańska (POL)	3	6^{6}

Third round
L Šafářová (CZE)	5	4
S Bammer (AUT)	7	6
9	V Zvonareva (RUS)	7^{7}	6
F Schiavone (ITA)	6^{4}	4

Quarterfinals
S Bammer (AUT)	3	6	3
9	V Zvonareva (RUS)	6	3	6

==== Section 2 ====
First round
4	S Williams (USA)	6	6
O Govortsova (BLR)	3	1
PR	S Stosur (AUS)	6	6
S Errani (ITA)	3	2
S Peng (CHN)	7	7^{7}
C Suárez Navarro (ESP)	5	6^{2}
N Vaidišová (CZE)	6	1	4
15	A Cornet (FRA)	4	6	6
10	D Hantuchová (SVK)	6	7
A Sugiyama (JPN)	2	5
IP	S Sfar (TUN)	4	1
C Wozniacki (DEN)	6	6
IP	T Tanasugarn (THA)	2	1
S Arvidsson (SWE)	6	6
K Bondarenko (UKR)	1	4
5	E Dementieva (RUS)	6	6

Second round
4	S Williams (USA)	6	6
PR	S Stosur (AUS)	2	0
S Peng (CHN)	2	2
15	A Cornet (FRA)	6	6
10	D Hantuchová (SVK)	1	3
C Wozniacki (DEN)	6	6
S Arvidsson (SWE)	3	4
5	E Dementieva (RUS)	6	6

Third round
4	S Williams (USA)	3	6	6
15	A Cornet (FRA)	6	3	4
C Wozniacki (DEN)	6^{3}	2
5	E Dementieva (RUS)	7^{7}	6

Quarterfinals
4	S Williams (USA)	6	4	3
5	E Dementieva (RUS)	3	6	6

=== Bottom half ===
==== Section 3 ====
First round
7	V Williams (USA)	6	6
T Bacsinszky (SUI)	3	2
S Mirza (IND)	1	1^{r}
I Benešová (CZE)	6	2
G Dulko (ARG)	3	4
C Dellacqua (AUS)	6	6
T Perebiynis (UKR)	4	7	4
12	V Azarenka (BLR)	6	5	6
14	F Pennetta (ITA)	2	6^{6}
K Kanepi (EST)	6	7^{8}
E Daniilidou (GRE)	3	3
V Razzano (FRA)	6	6
IP	A Morita (JPN)	5	7^{9}	6
M Erakovic (NZL)	7	6^{7}	4
N Li (CHN)	7^{7}	6
3	S Kuznetsova (RUS)	6^{5}	4

Second round
7	V Williams (USA)	6	6
I Benešová (CZE)	1	4
C Dellacqua (AUS)	2	2
12	V Azarenka (BLR)	6	6
K Kanepi (EST)	6	7
V Razzano (FRA)	4	5
IP	A Morita (JPN)	2	5
N Li (CHN)	6	7

Third round
7	V Williams (USA)	6	6
12	V Azarenka (BLR)	3	2
K Kanepi (EST)	6	2	0
N Li (CHN)	4	6	6

Quarterfinals
7	V Williams (USA)	5	5
N Li (CHN)	7	7

==== Section 4 ====
First round
6	D Safina (RUS)	6	7^{7}
PR	M Santangelo (ITA)	3	6^{1}
IP	A Molik (AUS)	1	1
Alt	MJ Martínez Sánchez (ESP)	6	6
IP	N Llagostera Vives (ESP)	2	6	7
K Zakopalová (CZE)	6	3	5
PR	J Zheng (CHN)	4	6	7
11	Á Szávay (HUN)	6	3	5
16	D Cibulková (SVK)	6	7
P Parmentier (FRA)	1	5
M Domachowska (POL)	3	4
T Pironkova (BUL)	6	6
PR	M Sequera (VEN)	6	1^{r}
A Bondarenko (UKR)	3	0
INV	C Black (ZIM)	3	3
2	J Janković (SRB)	6	6

Second round
6	D Safina (RUS)	7^{7}	6
Alt	MJ Martínez Sánchez (ESP)	6^{3}	1
IP	N Llagostera Vives (ESP)	7^{9}	1	4
PR	J Zheng (CHN)	6^{7}	6	6
16	D Cibulková (SVK)	6	6
T Pironkova (BUL)	2	2
A Bondarenko (UKR)	5	1
2	J Janković (SRB)	7	6

Third round
6	D Safina (RUS)	6	6
PR	J Zheng (CHN)	4	3
16	D Cibulková (SVK)	5	1
2	J Janković (SRB)	7	6

Quarterfinals
6	D Safina (RUS)	6	5	6
2	J Janković (SRB)	2	7	3
