= Tennis at the 2008 Summer Olympics – Men's singles =

Men's singles
- Tennis at the 2008 Summer Olympics

Final
- Champion: Rafael Nadal (ESP)
- Runner-up: Fernando González (CHI)
- Score: 6–3, 7–6^{(7–2)}, 6–3

Events
Singles	men	women
Doubles	men	women
Qualification
- Summer Olympics

Men's singles tennis at the Games of the XXIX Olympiad
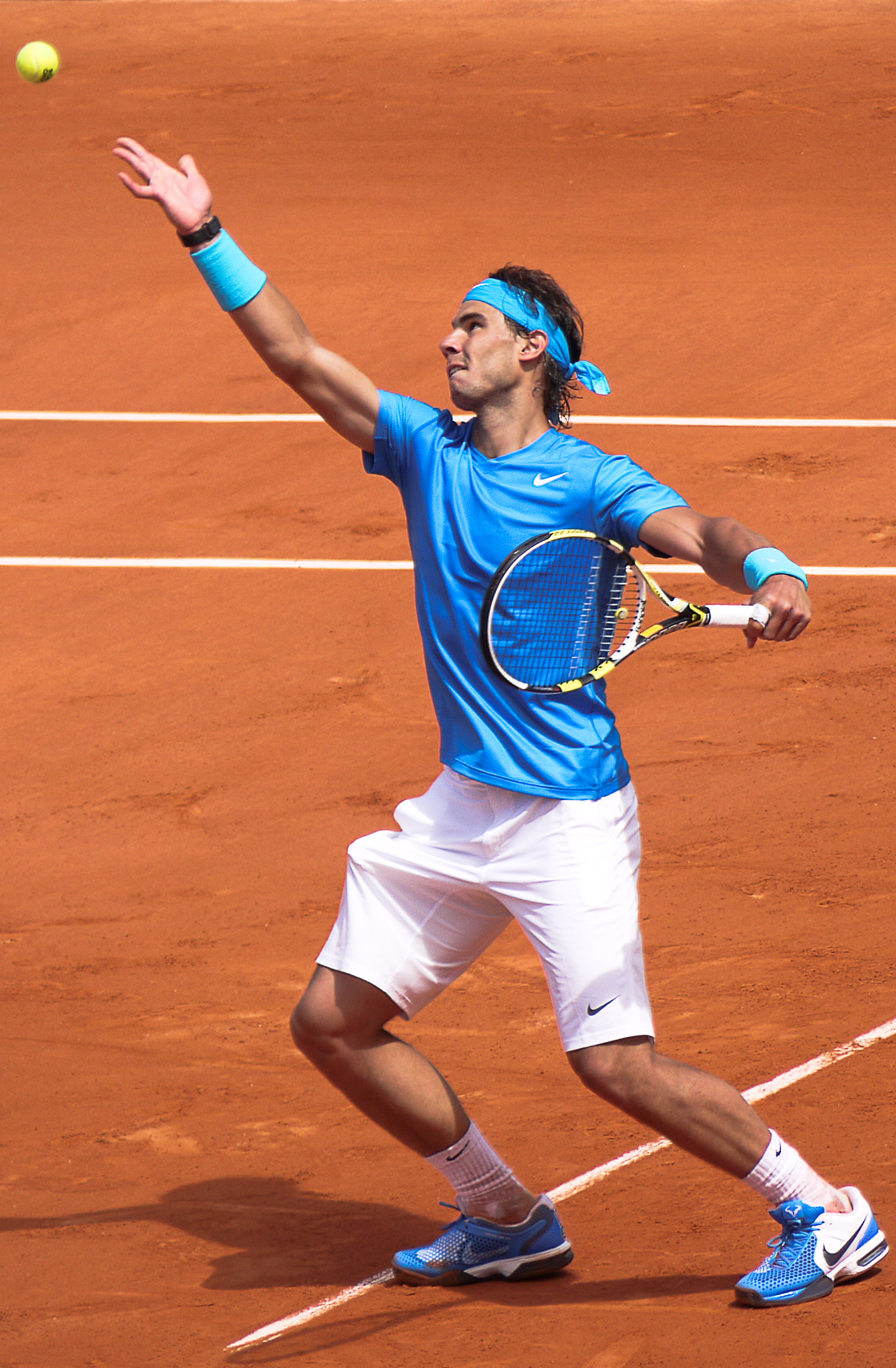
- Rafael Nadal (2011)
- Venue: Olympic Green Tennis Centre, Beijing
- Dates: 10–17 August 2008

Medalists
1st place, gold medalist(s)		Rafael Nadal	Spain
2nd place, silver medalist(s)		Fernando González	Chile
3rd place, bronze medalist(s)		Novak Djokovic	Serbia

Spain's Rafael Nadal defeated Chile's Fernando González in the final, 6–3, 7–6^{(7–2)}, 6–3 to win the gold medal in men's singles at the 2008 Summer Olympics. The win gave him the third of five components of the career Golden Slam, having already won the French Open and Wimbledon. He would go on to win the Australian Open and the US Open to become the second man (after Andre Agassi) to complete the career Golden Slam in singles. Following the event, Nadal became the world No. 1 for the first time, ending Roger Federer's record streak of 237 consecutive weeks with the top ranking. González became the first man to win a medal in men's singles across consecutive Olympiads since Charles Winslow in 1920. In the bronze medal match, Serbia's Novak Djokovic defeated the United States' James Blake (who upset Federer in the quarterfinals), 6–3, 7–6^{(7–4)}. It was Serbia's first Olympic tennis medal.

The tournament was held from August 10 to August 17 at the Olympic Green Tennis Centre in Beijing, China. The DecoTurf surface rendered the event a hardcourt competition. There were 64 players from 33 nations.

Chile's Nicolás Massú was the reigning gold medalist from 2004. He lost to Argentina's David Nalbandian in the second round.

== Background ==
This was the 13th (medal) appearance of the men's singles tennis event. The event has been held at every Summer Olympics where tennis has been on the program: from 1896 to 1924 and then from 1988 to the current program. Demonstration events were held in 1968 and 1984.

The number one seed was Roger Federer of Switzerland, making his third Olympic appearance. But number-two seed Rafael Nadal of Spain was favored, with recent wins at the French Open and Wimbledon and closing in on taking the #1 ranking from Federer. Nadal was making his Olympic debut along with Serbian player Novak Djokovic, who joined the rest of the Big Three in the top three seeds. Andy Murray of Great Britain also competed at the Olympics for the first time. Four of the eight quarterfinalists from 2004 returned: gold medalist Nicolás Massú and bronze medalist Fernando González of Chile and quarterfinalists Tomáš Berdych of the Czech Republic and Mikhail Youzhny of Russia.

The People's Republic of China, El Salvador, Latvia, Serbia, and Togo each made their debut in the event. France made its 12th appearance, most among all nations, having missed only the 1904 event.

== Qualification ==
Qualification for the men's singles was primarily through the ATP ranking list of 9 June 2008. Nations had been limited to four players in the event since the 2000 Games. There were 64 quota places available for men's singles. The first 56 were assigned through the world ranking. There were two Tripartite Commission invitation places and 6 final qualification places allocated by the ITF based on continental and national representation along with world rankings.

== Competition format ==
The competition was a single-elimination tournament with a bronze medal match. Matches were in best-of-3 sets, except for the final which was in best-of-5 sets. No tiebreak was played in the final set.

== Schedule ==
August	10	11	12	13	14	15	16	17
Morning	10.30	10.30	10.30					
Afternoon	17.00	17.00	17.00	16.00	16.00	16.00	16.00	16.00
	Round of 64	Round of 64	Round of 32	Round of 16	Quarterfinals	Semifinals	Bronze	Final

== Seeds ==
1. Roger Federer (SUI) (quarterfinals)
2. Rafael Nadal (ESP) (champion, gold medalist)
3. Novak Djokovic (SRB) (semifinals, bronze medalist)
4. Nikolay Davydenko (RUS) (second round)
5. David Ferrer (ESP) (first round)
6. Andy Murray (GBR) (first round)
7. David Nalbandian (ARG) (third round)
8. James Blake (USA) (semifinals, fourth place)
9. Stanislas Wawrinka (SUI) (second round)
10. Gilles Simon (FRA) (third round)
11. Nicolás Almagro (ESP) (first round)
12. Fernando González (CHI) (final, silver medalist)
13. Mikhail Youzhny (RUS) (third round)
14. Ivo Karlović (CRO) (withdrew because of a stomach illness)
15. Nicolas Kiefer (GER) (third round)
16. Radek Štěpánek (CZE) (first round)
17. Tomáš Berdych (CZE) (third round)

Click on the seed number of a player to go to their draw section.

== Draw ==
Key

- Q = Qualifier
- WC = Wild card
- LL = Lucky loser
- Alt = Alternate
- ITF = ITF entry
- PR = Protected ranking
- SR = Special ranking
- SE = Special exempt
- JE = Junior exempt
- JR = Junior Accelerator Programme entrant
- CO = College Accelerator Programme entrant
- NG = Next Gen Accelerator Program entrant
- w/o = Walkover
- r = Retired
- d = Defaulted
- INV = Tripartite Invitation
- IP = ITF place

=== Finals ===
Quarterfinals
1	Roger Federer (SUI)	4	6^{2}
8	James Blake (USA)	6	7^{7}
Paul-Henri Mathieu (FRA)	4	4
12	Fernando González (CHI)	6	6
Gaël Monfils (FRA)	6	1	4
3	Novak Djokovic (SRB)	4	6	6
Jürgen Melzer (AUT)	0	4
2	Rafael Nadal (ESP)	6	6

Semifinals
8	James Blake (USA)	6	5	9
12	Fernando González (CHI)	4	7	11
3	Novak Djokovic (SRB)	4	6	4
2	Rafael Nadal (ESP)	6	1	6

Final (gold medal match)
12	Fernando González (CHI)	3	6^{2}	3
2	Rafael Nadal (ESP)	6	7^{7}	6
Bronze medal match
8	James Blake (USA)	3	6^{4}
3	Novak Djokovic (SRB)	6	7^{7}

=== Top half ===
==== Section 1 ====
First round
1	R Federer (SUI)	6	6
D Tursunov (RUS)	4	2
H-t Lee (KOR)	6	3	4
INV	R Arevalo (ESA)	4	6	6
T Robredo (ESP)	4	6	6
A Seppi (ITA)	6	4	8
Alt	X Yu (CHN)	1	2
17	T Berdych (CZE)	6	6
10	G Simon (FRA)	6	6
R Söderling (SWE)	4	4
Alt	F Niemeyer (CAN)	6	2^{r}
G Cañas (ARG)	3	4
T Bellucci (BRA)	6	4	2
PR	D Hrbatý (SVK)	2	6	6
C Guccione (AUS)	3	6^{3}
8	J Blake (USA)	6	7^{7}

Second round
1	R Federer (SUI)	6	6
INV	R Arevalo (ESA)	2	4
A Seppi (ITA)	3	6^{4}
17	T Berdych (CZE)	6	7^{7}
10	G Simon (FRA)	7	6
G Cañas (ARG)	5	1
PR	D Hrbatý (SVK)	6^{3}	6	3
8	J Blake (USA)	7^{7}	4	6

Third round
1	R Federer (SUI)	6	7^{7}
17	T Berdych (CZE)	3	6^{4}
10	G Simon (FRA)	4	2
8	J Blake (USA)	6	6

Quarterfinals
1	R Federer (SUI)	4	6^{2}
8	J Blake (USA)	6	7^{7}

==== Section 2 ====
First round
4	N Davydenko (RUS)	6	6
E Gulbis (LAT)	4	2
P-H Mathieu (FRA)	7^{7}	6
N Lapentti (ECU)	6^{4}	2
INV	K Loglo (TOG)	3	2
IP	K Anderson (RSA)	6	6
IP	M Mirnyi (BLR)	3	1
15	N Kiefer (GER)	6	6
12	F González (CHI)	6	6
IP	P Sun (CHN)	4	4
M Čilić (CRO)	6	6^{5}	6
J Mónaco (ARG)	4	7^{7}	3
O Rochus (BEL)	6	3	6
I Minář (CZE)	3	6	3
J Tipsarević (SRB)	7^{10}	6
5	D Ferrer (ESP)	6^{8}	2

Second round
4	N Davydenko (RUS)	5	3
P-H Mathieu (FRA)	7	6
IP	K Anderson (RSA)	4	7^{7}	4
15	N Kiefer (GER)	6	6^{4}	6
12	F González (CHI)	6	6
M Čilić (CRO)	4	2
O Rochus (BEL)	7^{7}	2
J Tipsarević (SRB)	6^{5}	3	r

Third round
P-H Mathieu (FRA)	6	7
15	N Kiefer (GER)	3	5
12	F González (CHI)	6	6
O Rochus (BEL)	0	3

Quarterfinals
P-H Mathieu (FRA)	4	4
12	F González (CHI)	6	6

=== Bottom half ===
==== Section 3 ====
First round
7	D Nalbandian (ARG)	6	6
Alt	S Zeng (CHN)	2	1
IP	N Massú (CHI)	6	7
S Darcis (BEL)	4	5
S Bolelli (ITA)	5	6	4
V Hănescu (ROU)	7	3	6
G Monfils (FRA)	6	3	6
11	N Almagro (ESP)	4	6	3
13	M Youzhny (RUS)	6	6
J Vaněk (CZE)	4	1
J Nieminen (FIN)	6	4	4
T Johansson (SWE)	4	6	6
R Schüttler (GER)	6	6^{5}	6
IP	K Nishikori (JPN)	4	7^{7}	3
R Ginepri (USA)	4	4
3	N Djokovic (SRB)	6	6

Second round
7	D Nalbandian (ARG)	7^{7}	6
IP	N Massú (CHI)	6^{0}	1
V Hănescu (ROU)	4	6^{5}
G Monfils (FRA)	6	7^{7}
13	M Youzhny (RUS)	7	6
T Johansson (SWE)	5	2
R Schüttler (GER)	4	2
3	N Djokovic (SRB)	6	6

Third round
7	D Nalbandian (ARG)	4	4
G Monfils (FRA)	6	6
13	M Youzhny (RUS)	6^{3}	3
3	N Djokovic (SRB)	7^{7}	6

Quarterfinals
G Monfils (FRA)	6	1	4
3	N Djokovic (SRB)	4	6	6

==== Section 4 ====
First round
6	A Murray (GBR)	6^{5}	4
Y-h Lu (TPE)	7^{7}	6
A Calleri (ARG)	6	6
Alt	D Mullings (BAH)	1	1
M Daniel (BRA)	7^{11}	1	6
J Melzer (AUT)	6^{9}	6	8
F Dancevic (CAN)	6	3	2
9	S Wawrinka (SUI)	4	6	6
16	R Štěpánek (CZE)	6	6^{5}	9
M Llodra (FRA)	4	7^{7}	11
S Querrey (USA)	4	4
I Andreev (RUS)	6	6
L Hewitt (AUS)	7	7^{7}
IP	J Björkman (SWE)	5	6^{2}
P Starace (ITA)	2	6	2
2	R Nadal (ESP)	6	3	6

Second round
Y-h Lu (TPE)	6	6
A Calleri (ARG)	4	4
J Melzer (AUT)	6	6
9	S Wawrinka (SUI)	4	0
M Llodra (FRA)	4	6	1
I Andreev (RUS)	6	3	6
L Hewitt (AUS)	1	2
2	R Nadal (ESP)	6	6

Third round
Y-h Lu (TPE)	2	4
J Melzer (AUT)	6	6
I Andreev (RUS)	4	2
2	R Nadal (ESP)	6	6

Quarterfinals
J Melzer (AUT)	0	4
2	R Nadal (ESP)	6	6
