= Tennis at the 2008 Summer Olympics – Women's doubles =

Women's doubles
- Tennis at the 2008 Summer Olympics

Final
- Champions: Serena Williams (United States) Venus Williams (USA)
- Runners-up: Anabel Medina Garrigues (Spain) Virginia Ruano Pascual (ESP)
- Score: 6–2, 6–0

Events
Singles	men	women
Doubles	men	women
Qualification
- Summer Olympics

Women's doubles tennis at the Games of the XXIX Olympiad
- Venue: Olympic Green Tennis Centre
- Date: 10 to 17 August 2008
- Competitors: 64 from 21 nations

Medalists
1st place, gold medalist(s)		Serena Williams; Venus Williams	United States
2nd place, silver medalist(s)		Anabel Medina Garrigues; Virginia Ruano Pascual	Spain
3rd place, bronze medalist(s)		Yan Zi; Zheng Jie	China

The United States' Serena Williams and Venus Williams defeated Spain's Anabel Medina Garrigues and Virginia Ruano Pascual in the final, 6–2, 6–0 to win the gold medal in Women's Doubles tennis at the 2008 Summer Olympics. In the bronze medal match, China's Yan Zi and Zheng Jie defeated Ukraine's Alona Bondarenko and Kateryna Bondarenko, 6–2, 6–2. This was the Williams sisters' second Olympic gold medal in Women's Doubles.

The tournament was held from 10 August to 17 August at the Olympic Green Tennis Centre in Beijing, China. The DecoTurf surface rendered the event a hardcourt tournament.

China's Li Ting and Sun Tiantian were the reigning gold medalists, but Li retired from tennis in 2007. Sun partnered with Peng Shuai, but they were defeated in the first round by Belarus' Olga Govortsova and Darya Kustova.

== Medalists ==
Gold	Serena Williams / Venus Williams; United States
Silver	Anabel Medina Garrigues / Virginia Ruano Pascual; Spain
Bronze	Yan Zi / Zheng Jie; China

== Calendar ==
August	10	11	12	13	14	15	16	17
Morning	10.30	10.30	10.30					
Afternoon	17.00	17.00	17.00	16.00	16.00	16.00	16.00	16.00
	Round of 32	Round of 32	Round of 32	Round of 16	Round of 16	Quarterfinals	Semifinals	Bronze; Final

== Seeds ==
1. Svetlana Kuznetsova / Dinara Safina (RUS) (quarterfinals)
2. Serena Williams / Venus Williams (USA) (champions, gold medalists)
3. Chan Yung-jan / Chuang Chia-jung (TPE) (second round)
4. Anabel Medina Garrigues / Virginia Ruano Pascual (ESP) (final, silver medalists)
5. Lindsay Davenport / Liezel Huber (USA) (quarterfinals)
6. Alona Bondarenko / Kateryna Bondarenko (UKR) (semifinals, fourth place)
7. Elena Vesnina / Vera Zvonareva (RUS) (quarterfinals)
8. Yan Zi / Zheng Jie (CHN) (semifinals, bronze medalists)

== Draw ==
=== Key ===
- INV = Tripartite Invitation
- IP = ITF place
- ALT = Alternate
- r = Retired
- w/o = Walkover

=== Finals ===
Semifinals
8	Yan Zi (CHN); Zheng Jie (CHN)	4	6^{5}
4	Anabel Medina Garrigues (ESP); Virginia Ruano Pascual (ESP)	6	7^{7}
6	Alona Bondarenko (UKR); Kateryna Bondarenko (UKR)	6	4	1
2	Serena Williams (USA); Venus Williams (USA)	4	6	6

Final (gold medal match)
4	Anabel Medina Garrigues (ESP); Virginia Ruano Pascual (ESP)	2	0
2	Serena Williams (USA); Venus Williams (USA)	6	6
Bronze medal match
8	Yan Zi (CHN); Zheng Jie (CHN)	6	6
6	Alona Bondarenko (UKR); Kateryna Bondarenko (UKR)	2	2

=== Top half ===
First round
1	S Kuznetsova (RUS); D Safina (RUS)	6	3	7
M Santangelo (ITA); R Vinci (ITA)	1	6	5
T Golovin (FRA); P Parmentier (FRA)
IP	S Mirza (IND); S Rao (IND)	w/o
IP	E Gagliardi (SUI); P Schnyder (SUI)	6	6
IP	E Daniilidou (GRE); A Gerasimou (GRE)	0	4
D Hantuchová (SVK); J Husárová (SVK)	1	6^{9}
8	Yan Z (CHN); Zheng J (CHN)	6	7^{11}
4	A Medina Garrigues (ESP); V Ruano Pascual (ESP)	6	6
M Koryttseva (UKR); T Perebiynis (UKR)	3	4
S Stosur (AUS); R Stubbs (AUS)	6	6
P Kvitová (CZE); L Šafářová (CZE)	1	0
IP	M Ani (EST); K Kanepi (EST)	2	2
V Azarenka (BLR); T Poutchek (BLR)	6	6
IP	K Jans (POL); A Rosolska (POL)	2	1
5	L Davenport (USA); L Huber (USA)	6	6

Second round
1	S Kuznetsova (RUS); D Safina (RUS)	6	6
IP	S Mirza (IND); S Rao (IND)	4	4
IP	E Gagliardi (SUI); P Schnyder (SUI)	3	6^{2}
8	Yan Z (CHN); Zheng J (CHN)	6	7^{7}
4	A Medina Garrigues (ESP); V Ruano Pascual (ESP)	4	6	6
S Stosur (AUS); R Stubbs (AUS)	6	4	4
V Azarenka (BLR); T Poutchek (BLR)	4	6	3
5	L Davenport (USA); L Huber (USA)	6	4	6

Quarterfinals
1	S Kuznetsova (RUS); D Safina (RUS)	3	7	8
8	Yan Z (CHN); Zheng J (CHN)	6	5	10
4	A Medina Garrigues (ESP); V Ruano Pascual (ESP)	5	7^{8}	8
5	L Davenport (USA); L Huber (USA)	7	6^{6}	6

Semifinals
8	Yan Z (CHN); Zheng J (CHN)	4	6^{5}
4	A Medina Garrigues (ESP); V Ruano Pascual (ESP)	6	7^{7}

=== Bottom half ===
First round
6	A Bondarenko (UKR); K Bondarenko (UKR)	6	6
M Domachowska (POL); A Radwańska (POL)	3	2
O Govortsova (BLR); D Kustova (BLR)	7^{7}	7^{7}
S Peng (CHN); T Sun (CHN)	6^{1}	6^{3}
C Dellacqua (AUS); A Molik (AUS)	4	4
F Pennetta (ITA); F Schiavone (ITA)	6	6
A Cornet (FRA); V Razzano (FRA)	6^{2}	7^{7}	5
3	Y-j Chan (TPE); C-j Chuang (TPE)	7^{7}	6^{3}	7
7	E Vesnina (RUS); V Zvonareva (RUS)	2	6	6
N Llagostera Vives (ESP); MJ Martínez Sánchez (ESP)	6	1	3
IP	T Obziler (ISR); S Pe'er (ISR)	3	2
IP	G Dulko (ARG); B Jozami (ARG)	6	6
A Morita (JPN); A Sugiyama (JPN)	6	6
IP	G Arn (HUN); Á Szávay (HUN)	3	3
I Benešová (CZE); N Vaidišová (CZE)	6	5	1
2	S Williams (USA); V Williams (USA)	4	7	6

Second round
6	A Bondarenko (UKR); K Bondarenko (UKR)	6	6
O Govortsova (BLR); D Kustova (BLR)	1	3
F Pennetta (ITA); F Schiavone (ITA)	7^{7}	1	8
3	Y-j Chan (TPE); C-j Chuang (TPE)	6^{1}	6	6
7	E Vesnina (RUS); V Zvonareva (RUS)	6	6
IP	G Dulko (ARG); B Jozami (ARG)	2	3
A Morita (JPN); A Sugiyama (JPN)	5	2
2	S Williams (USA); V Williams (USA)	7	6

Quarterfinals
6	A Bondarenko (UKR); K Bondarenko (UKR)	6	3	7
F Pennetta (ITA); F Schiavone (ITA)	1	6	5
7	E Vesnina (RUS); V Zvonareva (RUS)	4	0
2	S Williams (USA); V Williams (USA)	6	6

Semifinals
6	A Bondarenko (UKR); K Bondarenko (UKR)	6	4	1
2	S Williams (USA); V Williams (USA)	4	6	6
