= Tennis at the 2008 Summer Olympics – Men's doubles =

Men's doubles
- Tennis at the 2008 Summer Olympics

Final
- Champions: Roger Federer (Switzerland) Stan Wawrinka (SUI)
- Runners-up: Simon Aspelin (Sweden) Thomas Johansson (SWE)
- Score: 6–3, 6–4, 6–7^{(4–7)}, 6–3

Events
| Singles | men | women |
| Doubles | men | women |
Qualification
- Summer Olympics

Men's doubles tennis at the Games of the XXIX Olympiad
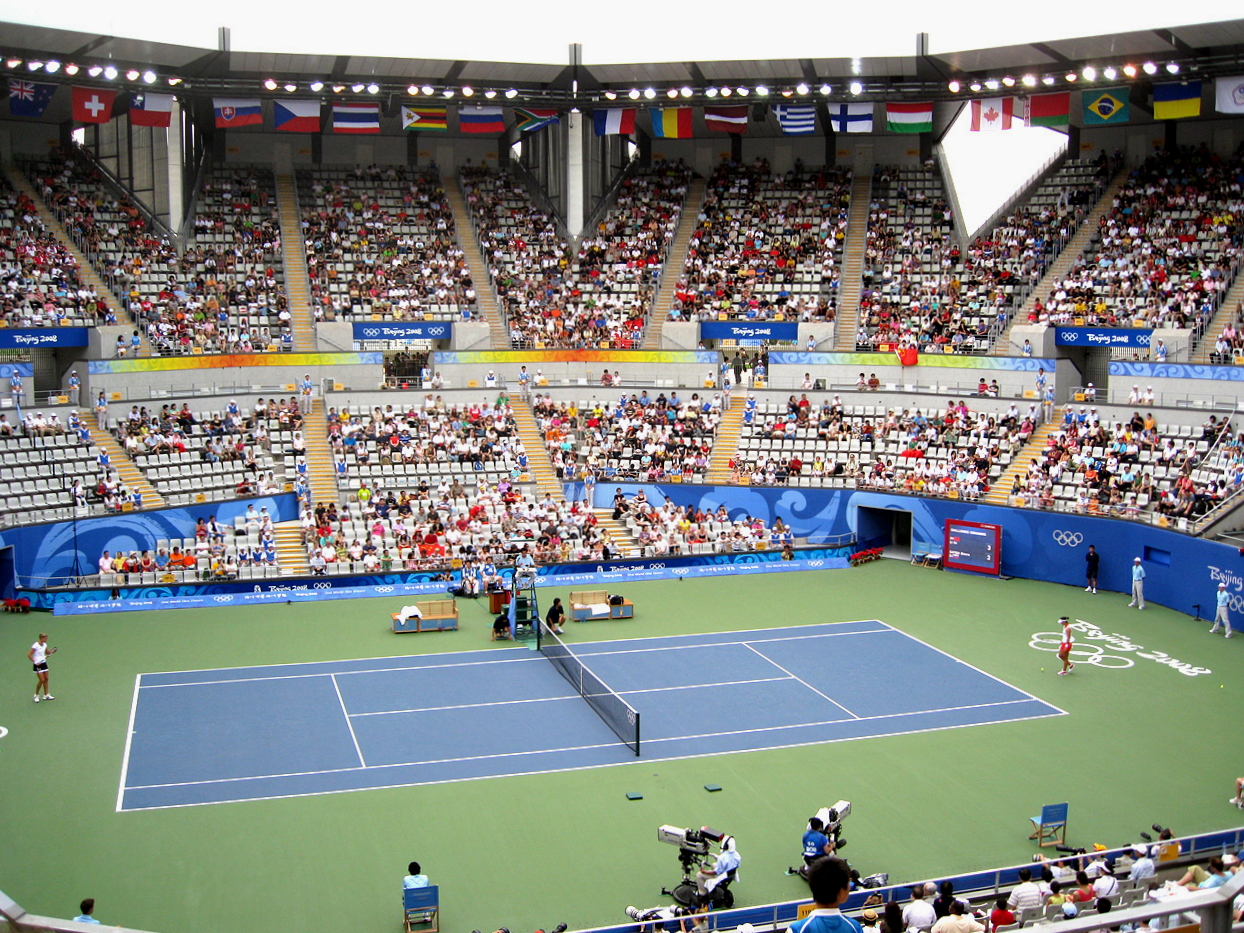
- Tennis at the 2008 Olympics
- Venue: Olympic Green Tennis Centre
- Dates: 10–16 August 2008
- Competitors: 64 from 24 nations

Medalists
| 1st place, gold medalist(s) | | Roger Federer; Stan Wawrinka | Switzerland |
| 2nd place, silver medalist(s) | | Simon Aspelin; Thomas Johansson | Sweden |
| 3rd place, bronze medalist(s) | | Bob Bryan; Mike Bryan | United States |

Switzerland's Roger Federer and Stanislas Wawrinka defeated Sweden's Simon Aspelin and Thomas Johansson in the final, 6–3, 6–4, 6–7^{(4–7)}, 6–3 to win the gold medal in men's doubles tennis at the 2008 Summer Olympics. In the bronze medal match, the United States' Bob Bryan and Mike Bryan defeated France's Arnaud Clément and Michaël Llodra, 3–6, 6–3, 6–4. It was Sweden's and the United States' first medals in the event since 1988.

The tournament was held from August 10 to August 16 at the Olympic Green Tennis Centre, in Beijing, China. The DecoTurf surface rendered the event a hardcourt tournament. There were 32 pairs from 24 nations.

Chile's Fernando González and Nicolas Massú were the reigning gold medalists from 2004, but they lost in the first round to Russia's Dmitry Tursunov and Mikhail Youzhny.

== Background ==
This was the 13th appearance of men's doubles tennis. The event has been held at every Summer Olympics where tennis has been on the program: from 1896 to 1924 and then from 1988 to the current program. A demonstration event was held in 1968.

The American pair of the Bryan brothers, Bob Bryan and Mike Bryan, were the top seed in 2004 but had exited in the quarterfinals. They were again the number one seed in Beijing. The 2004 gold winning pair of Fernando González and Nicolás Massú returned, as did German silver medalists Nicolas Kiefer and Rainer Schüttler and Indian fourth-place finishers Mahesh Bhupathi and Leander Paes. 2000 gold medalist Daniel Nestor of Canada competed once again with his 2004 partner, Frédéric Niemeyer. Each of the Big Four competed, but expectations of them in the doubles were not particularly high.

Serbia made its debut in the event. France and Great Britain each made their 10th appearance in the event, tied for most of all nations.

== Qualification ==
Qualification for the men's doubles was primarily through the ATP ranking list of 9 June 2008. Nations had been able to enter two pairs (four players) in the event since the 2004 Games. Each nation was limited to a total of 6 male players in the singles and doubles events combined, so nations with 4 singles players could add only 2 more in doubles. The men's doubles draw was 32 pairs (64 players), with most of the pairs coming from the singles event where nations had 2 or 4 players. There were 10 quota places for direct qualification to the doubles event, based on world ranking. The ITF allocated 12 places based on ranking and continental and national representation (bringing the total number of male tennis players to 86).

== Competition format ==
The competition was a single-elimination tournament with a bronze medal match. Matches were best-of-3 sets, except for the final which was best-of-5 sets. Tiebreakers were not played in the final set.

== Schedule ==
| August | 11 | 12 | 13 | 14 | 15 | 16 |
| Morning | 10:30 | 10:30 | | | | |
| Afternoon | 17:00 | 17:00 | 16:00 | 18:00 (rain delay) | 16:00 | 16:00 |
|---|---|---|---|---|---|---|
| | First round | First round | Second round | Quarterfinals | Semifinals | Bronze medal match Gold medal match |

== Seeds ==
1. Bob Bryan / Mike Bryan (USA) (semifinals, bronze medalists)
2. Novak Djokovic / Nenad Zimonjić (SRB) (first round)
3. Jonathan Erlich / Andy Ram (ISR) (first round)
4. Roger Federer / Stan Wawrinka (SUI) (champions, gold medalists)
5. Nicolás Almagro / David Ferrer (ESP) (second round)
6. Rafael Nadal / Tommy Robredo (ESP) (second round)
7. Mahesh Bhupathi / Leander Paes (IND) (quarterfinals)
8. Igor Andreev / Nikolay Davydenko (RUS) (quarterfinals)

== Draw ==
=== Key ===
- INV = Tripartite Invitation
- IP = ITF place
- ALT = Alternate
- r = Retired
- w/o = Walkover

=== Finals ===
Semifinals
1 | Bob Bryan (USA); Mike Bryan (USA) | 6^{6} | 4
4 | Roger Federer (SUI); Stan Wawrinka (SUI) | 7^{8} | 6
Arnaud Clément (FRA); Michaël Llodra (FRA) | 6^{6} | 6 | 17
Simon Aspelin (SWE); Thomas Johansson (SWE) | 7^{8} | 4 | 19

Final (gold medal match)
4 | Roger Federer (SUI); Stan Wawrinka (SUI) | 6 | 6 | 6^{4} | 6
Simon Aspelin (SWE); Thomas Johansson (SWE) | 3 | 4 | 7^{7} | 3
Bronze medal match
1 | Bob Bryan (USA); Mike Bryan (USA) | 3 | 6 | 6
Arnaud Clément (FRA); Michaël Llodra (FRA) | 6 | 3 | 4

=== Top half ===
First round
1 | B Bryan (USA); M Bryan (USA) | 6 | 6
M Knowles (BAH); D Mullings (BAH) | 2 | 1
IP | N Kiefer (GER); R Schüttler (GER) | 7^{7} | 3 | 1
J Knowle (AUT); J Melzer (AUT) | 6^{3} | 6 | 6
IP | C Guccione (AUS); L Hewitt (AUS) | 4 | 7^{7} | 18
IP | A Calleri (ARG); J Mónaco (ARG) | 6 | 6^{4} | 16
J Björkman (SWE); R Söderling (SWE) | 3 | 3
6 | R Nadal (ESP); T Robredo (ESP) | 6 | 6
4 | R Federer (SUI); S Wawrinka (SUI) | 7 | 6
S Bolelli (ITA); A Seppi (ITA) | 5 | 1
Alt | D Tursunov (RUS); M Youzhny (RUS) | 7^{7} | 6
IP | F González (CHI); N Massú (CHI) | 6^{5} | 4
T Berdych (CZE); R Štěpánek (CZE) | 7 | 2 | 6
M Melo (BRA); A Sá (BRA) | 5 | 6 | 8
G Monfils (FRA); G Simon (FRA) | 3 | 3
7 | M Bhupathi (IND); L Paes (IND) | 6 | 6

Second round
1 | B Bryan (USA); M Bryan (USA) | 7^{7} | 6
J Knowle (AUT); J Melzer (AUT) | 6^{2} | 4
IP | C Guccione (AUS); L Hewitt (AUS) | 6 | 7^{7}
6 | R Nadal (ESP); T Robredo (ESP) | 2 | 6^{5}
4 | R Federer (SUI); S Wawrinka (SUI) | 6 | 6
Alt | D Tursunov (RUS); M Youzhny (RUS) | 4 | 3
M Melo (BRA); A Sá (BRA) | 4 | 2
7 | M Bhupathi (IND); L Paes (IND) | 6 | 6

Quarterfinals
1 | B Bryan (USA); M Bryan (USA) | 6 | 6
IP | C Guccione (AUS); L Hewitt (AUS) | 4 | 3
4 | R Federer (SUI); S Wawrinka (SUI) | 6 | 6
7 | M Bhupathi (IND); L Paes (IND) | 2 | 4

Semifinals
1 | B Bryan (USA); M Bryan (USA) | 6^{6} | 4
4 | R Federer (SUI); S Wawrinka (SUI) | 7^{8} | 6

=== Bottom half ===
First round
8 | I Andreev (RUS); N Davydenko (RUS) | 6 | 6
J Blake (USA); S Querrey (USA) | 3 | 4
G Cañas (ARG); D Nalbandian (ARG) | 7^{8} | 6^{5} | 3
IP | S Darcis (BEL); O Rochus (BEL) | 6^{6} | 7^{7} | 6
A Murray (GBR); J Murray (GBR) | 4 | 6 | 6
D Nestor (CAN); F Niemeyer (CAN) | 6 | 3 | 4
A Clément (FRA); M Llodra (FRA) | 6 | 6
3 | J Erlich (ISR); A Ram (ISR) | 4 | 4
5 | N Almagro (ESP); D Ferrer (ESP) | 3 | 6 | 6
K Anderson (RSA); J Coetzee (RSA) | 6 | 3 | 4
S Aspelin (SWE); T Johansson (SWE) | 7^{9} | 6
P Hanley (AUS); J Kerr (AUS) | 6^{7} | 3
M Fyrstenberg (POL); M Matkowski (POL) | 6 | 6
IP | X Yu (CHN); S Zeng (CHN) | 3 | 4
M Damm (CZE); P Vízner (CZE) | 3 | 6 | 6
2 | N Djokovic (SRB); N Zimonjić (SRB) | 6 | 0 | 2

Second round
8 | I Andreev (RUS); N Davydenko (RUS) | 7^{8} | 6
IP | S Darcis (BEL); O Rochus (BEL) | 6^{6} | 2
A Murray (GBR); J Murray (GBR) | 1 | 3
A Clément (FRA); M Llodra (FRA) | 6 | 6
5 | N Almagro (ESP); D Ferrer (ESP) | 6^{6} | 4
S Aspelin (SWE); T Johansson (SWE) | 7^{8} | 6
M Fyrstenberg (POL); M Matkowski (POL) | 1 | 7^{7} | 7
M Damm (CZE); P Vízner (CZE) | 6 | 6^{3} | 5

Quarterfinals
8 | I Andreev (RUS); N Davydenko (RUS) | 2 | 7^{7} | 4
A Clément (FRA); M Llodra (FRA) | 6 | 6^{4} | 6
S Aspelin (SWE); T Johansson (SWE) | 7^{7} | 6
M Fyrstenberg (POL); M Matkowski (POL) | 6^{5} | 4

Semifinals
A Clément (FRA); M Llodra (FRA) | 6^{6} | 6 | 17
S Aspelin (SWE); T Johansson (SWE) | 7^{8} | 4 | 19
