= Klaus Nielsen =

Danish cyclist

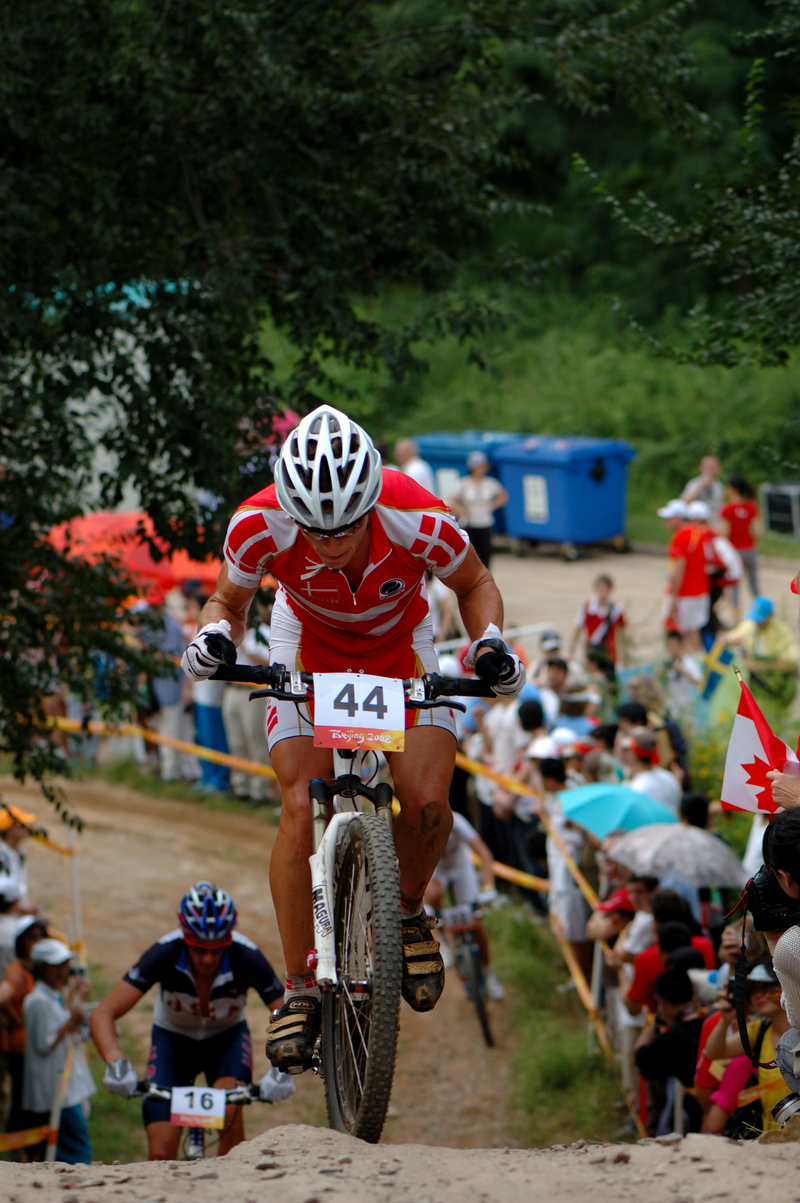
- Nielsen competing in the 2008 Olympics

Personal information
- Full name: Klaus Nielsen
- Born: 8 January 1980 (age 46) Køge, Denmark
- Height: 1.76 m (5 ft 9 1/2 in)
- Weight: 66 kg (146 lb)

Cycling career
- Sport: Cycling
- Current team: Team ALB-Gold Mountainbike
- Discipline: Mountain biking
- Role: Rider
- Rider type: Cross-country

Professional team
- 2006–: Team ALB-Gold Mountainbike

Klaus Nielsen (born 8 January 1980 in Køge) is a Danish professional mountain biker. He has won four Danish national championship titles in both men's cross-country and marathon races, and also represented his nation Denmark, as a 28-year-old senior, at the 2008 Summer Olympics. Nielsen currently trains and races professionally for Germany's Team ALB-Gold Mountain Bike Team.

Nielsen qualified for the Danish squad, along with his teammate Jakob Fuglsang, in the men's cross-country race at the 2008 Summer Olympics in Beijing by receiving one of the nation's two available berths for his team from the Union Cycliste Internationale (UCI), based on his top-ten performance at the World Cup series and Mountain Biking World Series. With one lap to go, Nielsen struggled to keep his form throughout a 4.8-km sturdy, treacherous cross-country course, and instead pulled off directly from the race by taking the thirty-first spot.
