= Tennis at the 2008 Summer Olympics =

- Date: 10–17 August 2008
- Edition: 15
- Surface: Hard (DecoTurf)
- Location: Olympic Green Tennis Centre, Beijing

Champions

Men's singles
- Rafael Nadal; Spain

Women's singles
- Elena Dementieva; Russia

Men's doubles
- Roger Federer / Stanislas Wawrinka; Switzerland

Women's doubles
- Serena Williams / Venus Williams; United States
- Summer Olympics

Tennis competitions at the 2008 Summer Olympics in Beijing were held from August 10 to August 17 at the Olympic Green Tennis Centre. The DecoTurf surface rendered the event a hardcourt tournament.

The women's singles event proved notable for being one of only two Olympiads — and the first since 1908 — in which all tennis medalists were from the same country – with Russian women sweeping the medals.

The men's singles featured the first time an Olympic tennis player had medaled in consecutive Olympiads since the 1920 Games, while the men's doubles gave Switzerland its first medal in the event. The doubles also saw the return of Switzerland and the United States to the medals stand for the first time since the 1988 re-introduction of the sport.

== Medal summary ==
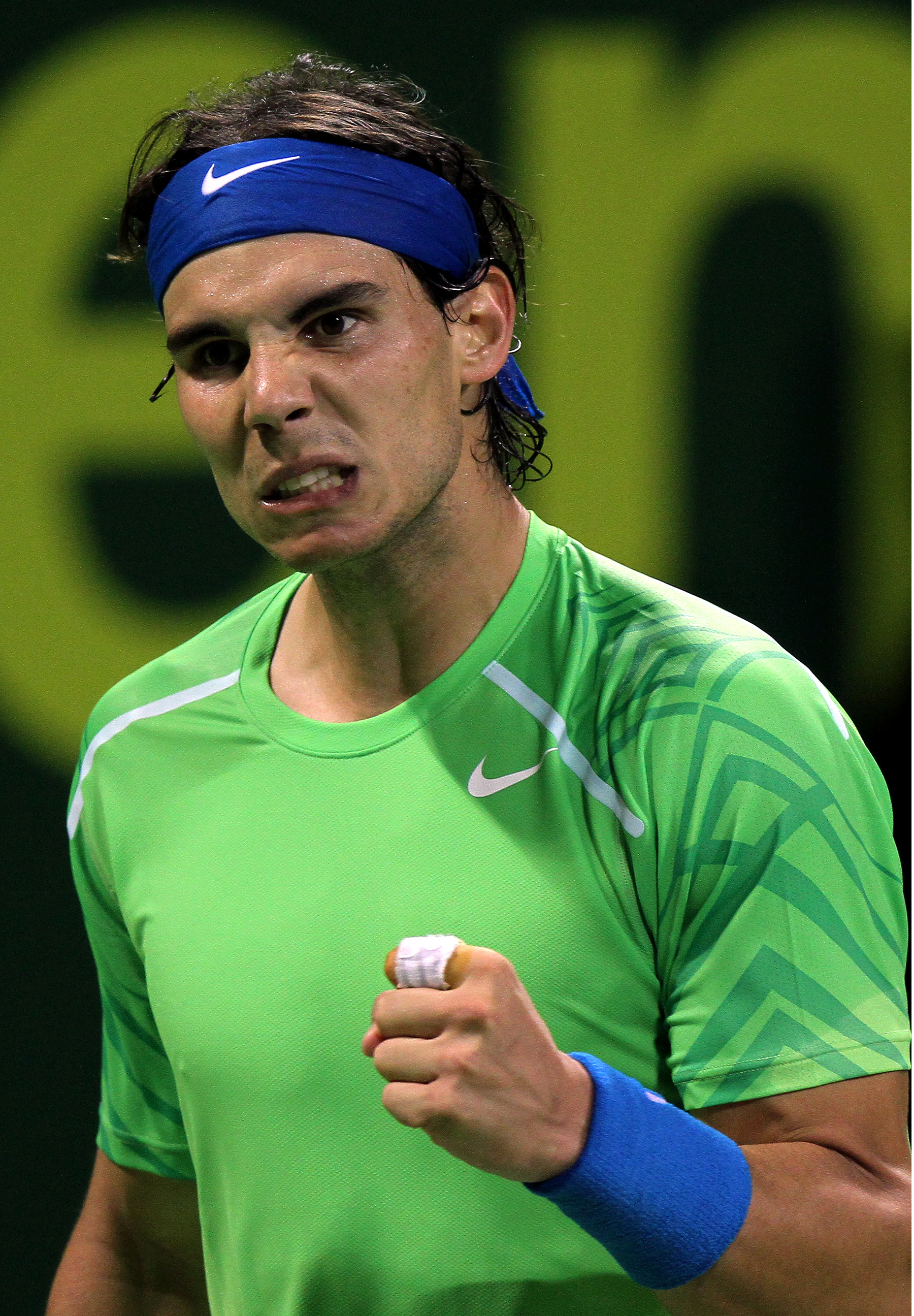
Rafael Nadal – the 2008 Olympics tennis Men's Champion.

Russia, the country that finished atop the medal table, won all three of its medals in the women's singles. This made them the first nation to win all three medals in an Olympic tennis competition since Great Britain in 1908. Rafael Nadal's gold for Spain made him the first Spanish tennis player to win a gold medal at the Olympics, and Nadal was also the first player from within the men's top 5 ranking to win in Olympic competition. Serbia, competing at an independent NOC for the second time, won its first tennis medal; and the United States continued to be prolific in women's doubles, having won every competition (including this one) since 1988, except in 2004.

Fernando González, who won the silver medal in men's singles, became the first tennis player since Charles Winslow (at Stockholm 1912 and Antwerp 1920) to win consecutive Olympic medals, having won gold (doubles) and bronze (singles) in 2004. In the men's doubles, Switzerland won its first medal in the event, and Sweden and the US returned to the podium for the first time since 1988.

Retrieved from the Beijing Olympics 2008 official website.

=== Events ===
Event	Gold	Silver	Bronze
Men's singles	Rafael Nadal; Spain	Fernando González; Chile	Novak Djokovic; Serbia
Men's doubles	Switzerland; Roger Federer; Stanislas Wawrinka	Sweden; Simon Aspelin; Thomas Johansson	United States; Bob Bryan; Mike Bryan
Women's singles	Elena Dementieva; Russia	Dinara Safina; Russia	Vera Zvonareva; Russia
Women's doubles	United States; Serena Williams; Venus Williams	Spain; Anabel Medina Garrigues; Virginia Ruano Pascual	China; Yan Zi; Zheng Jie

=== Medal table ===
* Host nation (China)

Rank	Nation	Gold	Silver	Bronze	Total
1	Russia	1	1	1	3
2	Spain	1	1	0	2
3	United States	1	0	1	2
4	Switzerland	1	0	0	1
5	Chile	0	1	0	1
5	Sweden	0	1	0	1
7	China*	0	0	1	1
7	Serbia	0	0	1	1
Totals (8 entries)		4	4	4	12

== Qualification ==
The majority of players in the singles competitions (56 of 64 players in the draw) gained entry through their position in either the ATP (men) or WTA (women) rankings. The remaining eight places were given to six players who gained ITF places (wild cards) and two who received invitations from the Tripartite Commission, which were intended to go to National Olympic Committees (NOCs) with small teams. For the doubles competitions, 10 players qualified directly. The remaining 86 places were allocated by the International Tennis Federation (ITF) based on world singles rankings. This method of allocating doubles places angered some players, such as Leander Paes, and led to some perceived discrepancies: Martin Damm and Pavel Vízner of the Czech Republic, ranked eighth in the ATP Race, were not seeded, whereas Nicolás Almagro and David Ferrer of Spain, who were highly ranked in singles but had not played doubles together before, were seeded fifth.

In the doubles, as in every team event at the Olympics, athletes had to compete on the side of athletes from the same NOC. This method of forming teams meant that Canadian world number one Daniel Nestor had to find a new partner (his partner at the time was Serb Nenad Zimonjić) and led one South African player, Liezel Huber, to seek U.S. citizenship so that she had the opportunity to play. Each NOC could submit a maximum of 6 players; this sextet could be composed of a maximum of four singles players and four doubles players (two teams).

The rankings of July 9 were used to determine the direct entrants. A number of tournaments, including the prestigious Wimbledon Championships took place between this date and the time of the Games beginning, and some players re-entered the qualification places during this time. Rainer Schüttler, who was propelled up the rankings by his semi-final appearance at Wimbledon, went to the Court of Arbitration for Sport and won his right to play at the Olympics, provoking a hostile response from the ITF, as it was a deviation from their original regulations.

=== ITF places ===
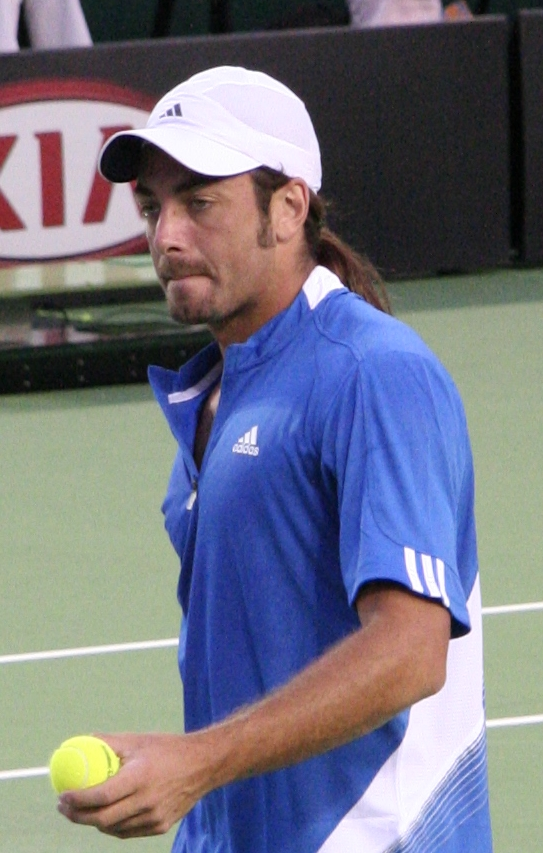
Nicolás Massú from Chile, who was the defending champion.

ITF places, ostensibly a form of wild card, were awarded to six players in both the men and women's singles, with one further place dispensed in the women's competition after Stephanie Vogt, entering via the Tripartite Commission, withdrew. The four official criteria for ITF place consideration were world ranking (no numeric specification), whether the country was represented in the tennis event, the number of players on site, and geographical location. However, there was some flexibility to these regulations: ITF president Ricci Bitti stated that it was his intention for the ITF places to grant opportunities to young players and players from under-represented countries, and to reward players who had competed diligently for their nation in the Davis or Fed Cup, or whom were former medalists.

The ITF places were announced on July 30. Sun Peng was originally the only Chinese man to enter the men's singles, and did so through the ITF places. Accompanying Sun were multiple Grand Slam doubles titlists Max Mirnyi and Jonas Björkman (who was retiring at the end of the year), nascent stars such as Kei Nishikori and Kevin Anderson, and defending champion Nicolás Massú. In the women's singles, the ITF places went to Alicia Molik, a bronze medalist in 2004, and Chan Yung-jan, a young player, with the remaining spots going to Mariya Koryttseva, Nuria Llagostera Vives, Ayumi Morita, Selima Sfar (a veteran Fed Cup player), and Tamarine Tanasugarn, who gained the retrospective place.

== Preview ==
Despite debate being re-ignited about tennis's place at the Olympics, and the attestations of some players (such as Andy Roddick, who chose to play an American tournament in order to prepare for the U.S. Open), that the Grand Slams remained the pre-eminent tennis tournaments, the 2008 Games saw the strongest field of competition since tennis's re-introduction to the Olympics in 1988. The singles competitions featured 17 of the top 20 men, and 18 of the top 20 women, with all of the top five men in attendance. This was a huge improvement on only 12 years ago in Atlanta, when only 3 men from the world's top 10 entered. Players had been further incentivized to compete at the Olympics after the ATP and WTA began awarding ranking points as of the 2000 Games.

Apathy towards the Games was still present, as Roddick and 2004 Men's Singles silver-medalist Mardy Fish opted not to play in Beijing to better prepare themselves for the U.S. Open, and Tom Tebbutt, commenting for The Globe and Mail (Canada), said "tennis appears headed for a downer at the Olympic Games". However, many players expressed their enthusiasm for the Games, including Roger Federer, Rafael Nadal, Jonas Björkman, Nicolás Massú, Andy Murray, Jelena Janković, Elena Dementieva, Alicia Molik, and Venus and Serena Williams. Novak Djokovic and Svetlana Kuznetsova said that they felt the Olympics were of equal or even greater prestige than the Grand Slams, and Federer maintained that the Olympics were one of his priorities for the season.

=== Men's singles ===
By winning gold in this Beijing Olympics, Rafael Nadal cemented his place in tennis history by winning gold in his first try. In the calendar year preceding the 2008 Olympics, there was a shift at the hierarchy of men's tennis as Rafael Nadal displaced Roger Federer as the world number one, after his record consecutive 237-week stay at the top of the rankings. From the second round of the 2008 Hamburg Masters to the semi-finals of the 2008 Cincinnati Masters (the last tournament before the Games), winning the French Open and Wimbledon in between, Nadal had won 32 consecutive matches. Due to the way the rankings are accrued, Nadal became number one on August 18, the day after the Olympic tournament, although this had been confirmed earlier. Nadal was therefore considered a strong favorite, as was Federer, who, despite reaching two Grand Slam finals, had had a poor year by his standards. Other top-ten players considered to be favorites included the reigning Australian Open champion, Novak Djokovic, Spanish world No. 4 and 2007 Tennis Masters Cup finalist David Ferrer, James Blake, David Nalbandian, Nikolay Davydenko and British player Andy Murray, who was lauded in the British press after winning the Cincinnati tournament and reaching the semi-finals of the previous week's Toronto Masters.

Three Chinese nationals appeared in the men's draw, but none qualified automatically, with Sun Peng relying on the places issued by the International Tennis Federation (ITF), and Yu Xinyuan and Zeng Shao-Xuan replacing withdrawn players as alternates.

By losing the final and thus settling for silver, Chile's Fernando González became the sixth tennis player, and fourth male player, in history to have won gold, silver and bronze medals in Olympic tennis. Following his gold medal, Nadal would later become just the second man to win a Golden Slam - Olympic gold in addition to the Australian Open, the French Open, Wimbledon and the US Open - with victory at the 2010 US Open (the first man to win a Golden Slam had been Andre Agassi, who completed his set at the 1999 French Open after winning gold in Atlanta in 1996.) He would also be elected as Team Spain's flagbearer for the opening ceremony in Rio de Janeiro in 2016 after being forced to withdraw from the London 2012 tournament at Wimbledon due to tendinitis.

=== Women's singles ===
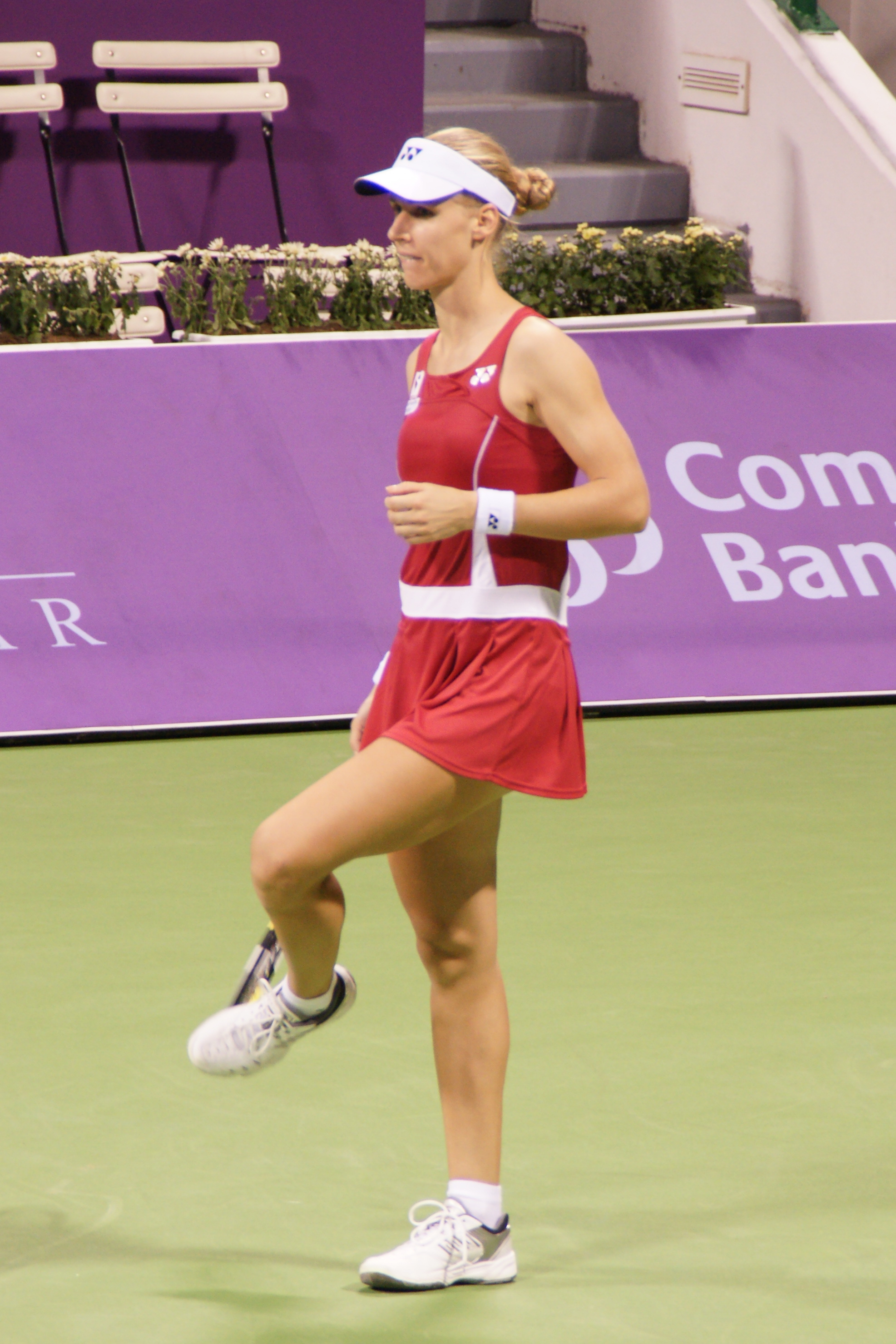
Women's singles champion, Elena Dementieva. Dementieva had reached two Grand Slam singles finals and lost before her triumph here.

The women's game also underwent a period of transition in 2008. Justine Henin, the incumbent world number one and reigning Olympic champion, retired on May 14, citing a lack of motivation for the game. Since then, three women had held the number one spot, and two, Maria Sharapova and Ana Ivanovic, had grappled with injury and poor form after successful first halves of the year. The pair were subsequently forced to withdraw from the Olympics. The favorites included Jelena Janković, who assumed the world number one ranking on August 11, the second day of the tennis tournament; Russians Svetlana Kuznetsova, the world number three, Elena Dementieva, who was a silver medalist at the 2000 Summer Olympics, and Dinara Safina, the French Open finalist who had won back-to-back tournaments in the weeks before the Olympics; and the Williams sisters Venus and Serena, who had strong Olympic pedigree having won the singles (Venus) and doubles in 2000, and who had recently played each other in the Wimbledon final.

A trio of players also represented China in the women's draw, although all three qualified automatically, unlike in the men's. They were Li Na, who was a semi-finalist at the Tier I Doha before succumbing to injury for most of the Summer; Zheng Jie, who raised hopes by becoming the first Chinese player to reach the semi-finals of a Grand Slam singles tournament at Wimbledon; and Peng Shuai.

== Venue ==
- Olympic Green Tennis Centre

Capacity

- Centre Court – 10000 seats.
- Show Court 1 – 4000 seats.
- Show Court 2 – 2000 seats.
- Remaining Courts – 7 courts seating for 200 seats each.

Surface – DecoTurf II

== Competition ==
=== Format ===
The tennis competition at the Olympic Games consisted of a single elimination tournament. The size of the singles draw, 64, meant that there were six rounds of competition in total, with five in the doubles owing to its smaller draw size of 32. Players reaching the semi-final were assured of an opportunity to compete for a medal, as the two losers in the semi-finals contested a bronze medal match.

Matches were best-of-3 sets, except for the Men's singles and doubles finals which were best-of-5 sets. The decisive final set had no tiebreak. With athletes needing a two-game advantage to win the match, this led to one match's final set, the men's doubles semi-final between Arnaud Clément & Michaël Llodra and Simon Aspelin & Thomas Johansson, extending to 19–17 in Aspelin & Johansson's favour.

=== Calendar ===
August	10	11	12	13	14	15	16	17
Morning	10.30	10.30	10.30					
Afternoon	17.00	17.00	17.00	16.00	16.00	16.00	16.00	16.00
Men's singles	Round of 64	Round of 64	Round of 32	Round of 16	Quarterfinals	Semifinals	Bronze	Final
Women's singles	Round of 64	Round of 64	Round of 32	Round of 16	Quarterfinals	Quarterfinals	Semifinals	Bronze; Final
Men's doubles	Round of 32	Round of 32	Round of 16	Round of 16	Quarterfinals	Semifinals	Bronze; Final	
Women's doubles	Round of 32	Round of 32	Round of 32	Round of 16	Round of 16	Round of 16; Quarterfinals	Semifinals	Bronze; Final

Note: due to rain delays the Women's Singles schedule was pushed back a day.

=== Day 1 ===
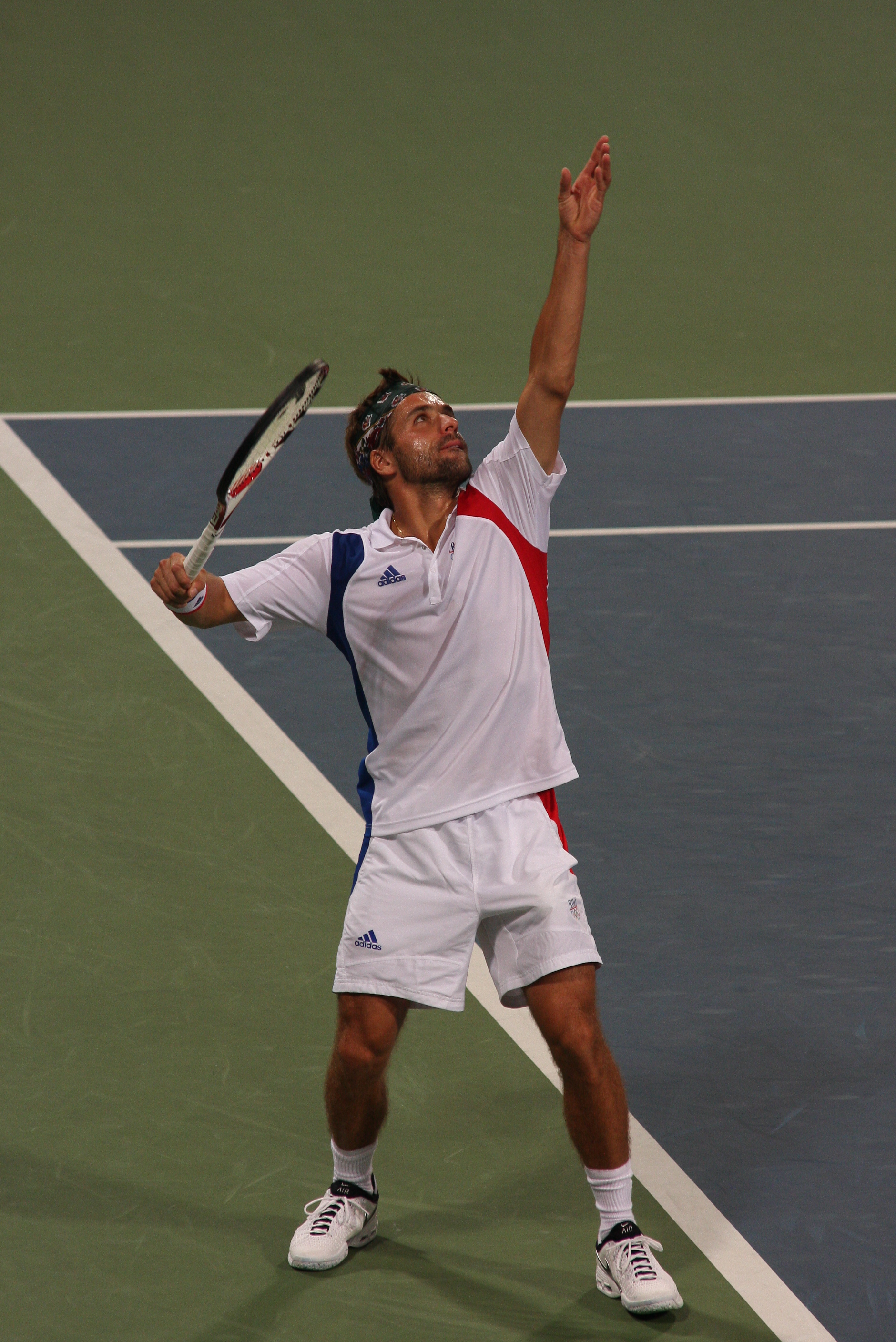
French player Arnaud Clément

On Day 1, the conditions were at a humidity level of 89%, and ITF commentators felt that this, along with the heat and smog, would result in fatigue for some players, especially in longer matches. Play did not begin at the scheduled time of 10 a.m., and was delayed until 12.53 p.m., when number eight seed James Blake began his match against Chris Guccione on the Centre Court. The Women's Singles competition also commenced. However, play was suspended again at 4.26 p.m., and eventually cancelled for the rest of the day.

Only nine matches of the 20 scheduled matches were completed as a consequence of the rain-disrupted sessions. Blake progressed, as did fourth seeded Russian Nikolay Davydenko, Chilean Fernando González, Czech Tomáš Berdych, and Argentine Guillermo Cañas, who benefited from a retirement from his opponent Frédéric Niemeyer, who was a set up, and said that he withdrew from the match in order to save himself for his doubles match with Sydney champion Daniel Nestor (their match eventually took place the following day). Blake said that he had been inspired to victory by fellow American Michael Phelps, who won his first of eight gold medals in swimming, in the 400 metre individual medley, on the same day. In the women's draw, Dane Caroline Wozniacki, Australian Samantha Stosur, Italian Francesca Schiavone, and Bulgarian Tsvetana Pironkova all progressed.

=== Day 2 ===
On Day 2, humidity levels again proved to be unfavourable for players, with some saying that it was the worst they had ever played in. Play was only mildly interrupted by rain, with three scheduled matches failing to reach their conclusion. Defending champion Nicolás Massú defeated Steve Darcis (Belgium), and Rafael Nadal came through against Potito Starace (Italy) in three sets, in what the BBC described as a "tough" match. Roger Federer, still the top seed, progressed, as did other seeds such as Serb Novak Djokovic, Argentine David Nalbandian, Frenchman Gilles Simon, and Swiss Stanislas Wawrinka. Former world number one Lleyton Hewitt came through a testing match against Jonas Björkman, 7–5, 7–6(2), and Rafael Arevalo, one of the three players to be invited by the Tripartite Commission, won against Lee Hyung-taik, in what was his first match against a top 100 player. The highest seed to exit was Spain's David Ferrer (number five). The number six seed, Britain's Andy Murray, also lost, playing against Chinese Taipei representative Lu Yen-hsun. Along with Ferrer, number fourteen seed Nicolás Almagro and the unseeded Tommy Robredo also exited, meaning that three of the four Spanish representatives in the men's singles went out.

In the women's singles, María José Martínez Sánchez became the first player to progress on the day, knocking out Alicia Molik. Second seed Jelena Janković won, as did American Serena Williams, Russian Elena Dementieva, Slovak Daniela Hantuchová, and Frenchwoman Alizé Cornet amongst others, in their first round matches. Two seeds fell, both to Chinese opponents: Li Na defeated number three seed Svetlana Kuznetsova (Russia), and number 11 Ágnes Szávay (Hungary) lost to Zheng Jie. Afterwards, Zheng, a native of Sichuan, said the courage shown by the victims of the earthquake in May 2008 had helped inspire her to victory.

The men's doubles competition also began, having originally been scheduled to start on Day 1. Chris Guccione and Lleyton Hewitt (Australia) defeated Agustín Calleri and Juan Mónaco (Argentina) 4–6, 7–6(4), 18–16. The match, which lasted three hours and 17 minutes, was the longest (in games, in a three set match) in Olympic history at 61. The previous record was held by Todd Woodbridge and Mark Woodforde (Australia) and Jacco Eltingh and Paul Haarhuis (Netherlands), who competed a 54-game match (6–2, 5–7, 18–16) at the 1996 event. Elsewhere, defending champions Massu and Gonzalez exited, Steve Darcis and Olivier Rochus (Belgium) defeated Guillermo Cañas and David Nalbandian (Argentina) in a match that exceeded two and a half hours, and Canada's only doubles team of Nestor and Niemeyer lost to the Murray brothers of Andy and Jamie (Great Britain). Federer and Nadal both came through, with their partners Wawrinka and Robredo, respectively.

=== Day 3 ===
Federer, Nadal, and Djoković, the top three seeds respectively, all saw safe passage into the second round on Day 3. However, Federer's countryman Wawrinka exited after losing to Austrian Jürgen Melzer, in what the ITF commentary team called a "bad loss". Notable losers included Massu, who went out to number seven seed Nalbandian; and Davydenko, the third seed, who lost to Paul-Henri Mathieu (France). Gilles Simon and Gaël Monfils were two other French players to progress to the third round. The match between Nicolas Kiefer (Germany) and Kevin Anderson became the longest singles match of the tournament up to that point, lasting three hours and twenty minutes, with Kiefer prevailing.

Seeds who progressed in the women's singles included Janković (Serbia), the Williams sisters (United States), Vera Zvonareva (Russia), and Victoria Azarenka (Belarus). Number ten seed Daniela Hantuchová (Slovakia), who was being watched by her country's head of state, Ivan Gašparovič, lost to rising star Caroline Wozniacki (Denmark), and the number eight seed Agnieszka Radwańska (Poland) lost to Italy's Francesca Schiavone. Number thirteen seed Patty Schnyder (Switzerland) also lost. One of the Chinese hopefuls, Peng, had the President of the Beijing Organizing Committee for the Olympic Games (BOCOG), Liu Qui, courtside for her match against Alizé Cornet, but she was beaten in two sets. Her compatriot, Zheng, came through another long match.

In the doubles, Bahamian Mark Knowles, a Grand Slam champion and the world number seven coming into the event, was knocked out, partnering Devin Mullings, by the Bryan brothers (United States). Mullings came into the Olympic tournament without a doubles ranking, and with a singles ranking of 1017. Other teams progressing including Martin Damm and Pavel Vízner (Czech Republic), who defeated Djoković and Nenad Zimonjić (Serbia). In the women's doubles, Liezel Huber and Lindsay Davenport (United States), both former Grand Slam doubles champions, came through. The other American team in the draw, the Williams sisters, came through a tough match against the Czech team of Iveta Benešová and Nicole Vaidišová, as did Zheng and Yan against the Slovak team of Hantuchová and Janette Husárová. The Russian team of Dinara Safina and Svetlana Kuznetsova, which combined two top ten singles players, progressed too.

== Ranking points ==
Rankings points determine the position of a player in the ATP (men's) and WTA (women's) rankings, which are based on players' performances in the previous 52-weeks. For the Olympics, the men's player who won received 400 ranking points—put in perspective, this was 100 more than a win at the most prestigious International Series Gold tournaments, 100 less than a Masters Series win, and 600 less than a triumph at one of the four Grand Slam tournaments.

Stage	Gold medal	Silver medal	Bronze medal	Fourth place	Quarterfinals	Round of 16	Round of 32	Round of 64
Men's singles	400	280	205	155	100	50	25	5
Women's singles	353	245	175	135	90	48	28	1

== See also ==
- Wheelchair tennis at the 2008 Summer Paralympics
