= Laoshan Mountain Bike Course =

Cycling venue in Beijing

Coordinates: 39.9151°N 116.2165°E

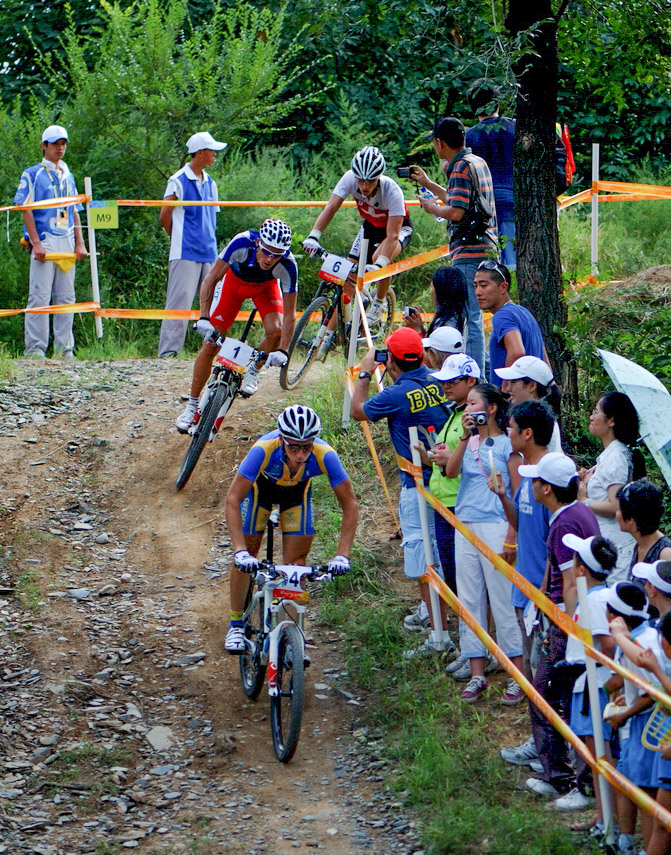
Laoshan Mountain Bike Course during the 2008 Summer Olympics

The Laoshan Mountain Bike Course (simplified Chinese: 老山山地自行车场; traditional Chinese: 老山山地自行車場; pinyin: Lǎoshān Shāndì Zìxíngchē Chǎng) is a mountain bike cycling venue located in western Beijing, China adjacent to the Laoshan Velodrome. It began its renovation and expansion program in May 2006.

The course hosted the mountain bike competitions of the 2008 Summer Olympics.

The project involves a competition course of 4.6 kilometres in circumference, a fixed building with a floor space of 8,275 square metres, a temporary spectator stand that seats 2,000 and other temporary facilities for competitions.

The project was completed in the second half of 2007 and became a training base for the Chinese cycling team. It was also opened to the public after the 2008 Games.
