= Switzerland at the 2008 Summer Olympics =

- IOC code: SUI
- NOC: Swiss Olympic Association
- Website: www.swissolympic.ch (in German and French)

in Beijing
- Competitors: 84 in 19 sports
- Flag bearers: Roger Federer (opening); Sergei Aschwanden (closing)
- Medals Ranked 33rd: Gold 2 Silver 1 Bronze 4 Total 7

Summer Olympics appearances (overview)
- 1896; 1900; ~~1904~~; 1908; 1912; 1920; 1924; 1928; 1932; 1936; 1948; 1952; 1956; 1960; 1964; 1968; 1972; 1976; 1980; 1984; 1988; 1992; 1996; 2000; 2004; 2008; 2012; 2016; 2020; 2024; 2028

Other related appearances
- 1906 Intercalated Games

Switzerland competed at the 2008 Summer Olympics in Beijing, People's Republic of China. This is a list of all of the Swiss athletes who have qualified for the Olympics and have been nominated by Swiss Olympic Association.

== Medalists ==
Medal	Name	Sport	Event
Gold	Fabian Cancellara	Cycling	Men's time trial
Gold	Roger Federer; Stanislas Wawrinka	Tennis	Men's doubles
Silver	Fabian Cancellara	Cycling	Men's road race
Bronze	Karin Thürig	Cycling	Women's time trial
Bronze	Sergei Aschwanden	Judo	Men's 90 kg
Bronze	Nino Schurter	Cycling	Men's cross-country
Bronze	Christina Liebherr; Pius Schwizer; Niklaus Schurtenberger; Steve Guerdat	Equestrian	Team jumping

== Archery ==
Athlete	Event	Ranking round		Round of 64	Round of 32	Round of 16	Quarterfinals	Semifinals	Final / BM	
Athlete	Event	Score	Seed	Opposition Score	Opposition Score	Opposition Score	Opposition Score	Opposition Score	Opposition Score	Rank
Nathalie Dielen	Women's individual	601	54	Erdyniyeva (RUS) (11); L 102–107	Did not advance					

== Athletics ==
Key

- Note–Ranks given for track events are within the athlete's heat only
- Q = Qualified for the next round
- q = Qualified for the next round as a fastest loser or, in field events, by position without achieving the qualifying target
- NR = National record
- N/A = Round not applicable for the event
- Bye = Athlete not required to compete in round

Men
Track & road events

Athlete	Event	Heat		Quarterfinal		Semifinal		Final	
Athlete	Event	Result	Rank	Result	Rank	Result	Rank	Result	Rank
Philipp Bandi	5000 m	13:59.68	10	—N/a				Did not advance	
Marco Cribari	200 m	20.98	5	Did not advance					
Marc Schneeberger	200 m	20.86	4 q	21.48	8	Did not advance			
Viktor Röthlin	Marathon	—N/a						2:10:35	6

Field events

Athlete	Event	Qualification		Final	
Athlete	Event	Distance	Position	Distance	Position
Julien Fivaz	Long jump	7.53	36	Did not advance	

Women
Field events

Athlete	Event	Qualification		Final	
Athlete	Event	Distance	Position	Distance	Position
Nicole Büchler	Pole vault	4.30	22	Did not advance	

Combined events – Heptathlon

Athlete	Event	100H	HJ	SP	200 m	LJ	JT	800 m	Final	Rank
Linda Züblin	Result	13.90	1.62	12.34	24.99	5.74	47.19	2:18.68	5743	30*
Linda Züblin	Points	993	759	684	888	771	806	842	5743	30*

* The athlete who finished in second place, Lyudmila Blonska of Ukraine, tested positive for a banned substance. Both the A and the B tests were positive, therefore Blonska was stripped of her silver medal, and Züblin moved up a position.

== Badminton ==
Athlete	Event	Round of 64	Round of 32	Round of 16	Quarterfinal	Semifinal	Final / BM	
Athlete	Event	Opposition Score	Opposition Score	Opposition Score	Opposition Score	Opposition Score	Opposition Score	Rank
Christian Bösiger	Men's singles	Bye	Wacha (POL); L 12–21, 21–11, 19–21	Did not advance				
Jeanine Cicognini	Women's singles	Moura (POR); W 21–9, 21–13	Rice (CAN); L 11–21, 13–21	Did not advance				

== Canoeing ==
=== Slalom ===
Athlete	Event	Preliminary						Semifinal		Final			
Athlete	Event	Run 1	Rank	Run 2	Rank	Total	Rank	Time	Rank	Time	Rank	Total	Rank
Michael Kurt	Men's K-1	87.58	16	91.08	19	178.66	17	Did not advance					

== Cycling ==
=== Road ===
Athlete	Event	Time	Rank
Fabian Cancellara	Men's road race	6:23:49	2nd place, silver medalist(s)
Fabian Cancellara	Men's time trial	1:02:11	1st place, gold medalist(s)
Nicole Brändli-Sedoun	Women's road race	3:22:52	18
Priska Doppmann	Women's road race	3:22:45	7
Priska Doppmann	Women's time trial	36:27.79	8
Jennifer Hohl	Women's road race	Did not finish	
Karin Thürig	Women's time trial	35:50.99	3rd place, bronze medalist(s)

The athlete who finished in second place, Davide Rebellin (Italy), tested positive for a banned substance. Both the A and the B tests were positive, therefore Rebellin was stripped of his silver medal, and Cancellara was upgraded to silver.

=== Track ===
Pursuit

Athlete	Event	Qualification		Semifinals		Finals	
Athlete	Event	Time	Rank	Opponent Results	Rank	Opponent Results	Rank
Karin Thürig	Women's individual pursuit	3:40.862	9	Did not advance			

Omnium

Athlete	Event	Points	Laps	Rank
Franco Marvulli; Bruno Risi	Men's madison	3	–1	11

=== Mountain biking ===
Athlete	Event	Time	Rank
Christoph Sauser	Men's cross-country	1:57:54	4
Nino Schurter	Men's cross-country	1:57:52	3rd place, bronze medalist(s)
Florian Vogel	Men's cross-country	Did not finish	
Petra Henzi	Women's cross-country	1:48:41	6
Nathalie Schneitter	Women's cross-country	1:53:42	15

=== BMX ===
Athlete	Event	Seeding		Quarterfinals		Semifinals		Final	
Athlete	Event	Result	Rank	Points	Rank	Points	Rank	Result	Rank
Roger Rinderknecht	Men's BMX	36.466	14	12	3 Q	19	7	Did not advance	
Jenny Fähndrich	Women's BMX	38.209	9	—N/a		17	6	Did not advance	

== Equestrian ==
=== Eventing ===
Athlete	Horse	Event	Dressage		Cross-country			Jumping						Total	
Athlete	Horse	Event	Dressage		Cross-country			Qualifier			Final			Total	
Athlete	Horse	Event	Penalties	Rank	Penalties	Total	Rank	Penalties	Total	Rank	Penalties	Total	Rank	Penalties	Rank
Tiziana Realini	Gamour	Individual	48.90	28	32.80	81.70	31	16.00	97.70	37	Did not advance			97.70	37

=== Show jumping ===
Athlete	Horse	Event	Qualification								Final					Total	
Athlete	Horse	Event	Round 1		Round 2			Round 3			Round A		Round B			Total	
Athlete	Horse	Event	Penalties	Rank	Penalties	Total	Rank	Penalties	Total	Rank	Penalties	Rank	Penalties	Total	Rank	Penalties	Rank
Steve Guerdat	Jalisca Solier	Individual	1	14	4 #	5	13 Q	5	10	13 Q	4	11 Q	4	8	10	8	10
Christina Liebherr	No Mercy	Individual	0	=1	4	4	8 Q	23	27	38	Did not advance					27	38
Pius Schwizer	Nobless M	Individual	4 #	30	4	8	16 Q	5	13	15 Q	8	=23	Did not advance			8	23
Niklaus Schurtenberger	Cantus	Individual	0	=1	4	4	8 Q	8	12	14 Q	8	=23	Did not advance			8	=23
Steve Guerdat; Christina Liebherr; Pius Schwizer; Niklaus Schurtenberger	See above	Team	—N/a								12	1 Q	18	30	3	30	(bronze) *

# denotes a result that did not count toward the team score
* Switzerland was upgraded to bronze medal in the team jumping competition after Camiro, the horse of Norway's bronze medal winner Tony André Hansen, tested positive for use of capsaicin and was disqualified.

== Fencing ==
Men

Athlete	Event	Round of 64	Round of 32	Round of 16	Quarterfinal	Semifinal	Final / BM	
Athlete	Event	Opposition Score	Opposition Score	Opposition Score	Opposition Score	Opposition Score	Opposition Score	Rank
Michael Kauter	Individual épée	Bye	Nikishyn (UKR); W 15–12	Verwiljen (NED); L 13–15	Did not advance			

Women

Athlete	Event	Round of 32	Round of 16	Quarterfinal	Semifinal	Final / BM	
Athlete	Event	Opposition Score	Opposition Score	Opposition Score	Opposition Score	Opposition Score	Rank
Sophie Lamon	Individual épée	Martínez (VEN); W 15–9	Li N (CHN); L 10–15	Did not advance			

== Gymnastics ==
=== Artistic ===
Men

Athlete	Event	Qualification								Final							
Athlete	Event	Apparatus						Total	Rank	Apparatus						Total	Rank
Athlete	Event	F	PH	R	V	PB	HB	Total	Rank	F	PH	R	V	PB	HB	Total	Rank
Claudio Capelli	All-around	13.600	14.475	14.375	15.325	14.100	14.675	86.550	35	Did not advance							
Christoph Schärer	Pommel horse	—N/a	13.150	—N/a				13.150	66	Did not advance							
Christoph Schärer	Horizontal bar	—N/a					15.350	15.350	14	Did not advance							

Women

Athlete	Event	Qualification						Final					
Athlete	Event	Apparatus				Total	Rank	Apparatus				Total	Rank
Athlete	Event	F	V	UB	BB	Total	Rank	F	V	UB	BB	Total	Rank
Ariella Käslin	All-around	14.300	15.225	14.650	13.875	58.050	25 Q	13.950	15.350	14.275	14.425	58.000	18
Ariella Käslin	Vault	—N/a	14.975	—N/a		14.975	8 Q	—N/a	15.050	—N/a		15.050	5

Marks and ranks from vault qualification differ as two vaults were used to determine event finalists while only the first of those counts toward the All-around total.
Ariella Käslin qualified for the All-around final of the top 24 gymnasts because the number of finalists from the same nation is limited to two. Thus, five gymnasts ranked ahead of her were ineligible for the final.

== Judo ==
Athlete	Event	Round of 32	Round of 16	Quarterfinals	Semifinals	Repechage 1	Repechage 2	Repechage 3	Final / BM	
Athlete	Event	Opposition Result	Opposition Result	Opposition Result	Opposition Result	Opposition Result	Opposition Result	Opposition Result	Opposition Result	Rank
Sergei Aschwanden	Men's −90 kg	Pinske (GER); W 0010–0002	Huizinga (NED); W 1101–0010	Benikhlef (ALG); L 0000–0001	Did not advance	Bye	El Assri (MAR); W 0001–0000	Santos (BRA); W 0000–0000 YUS	Pershin (RUS); W 1000–0020	3rd place, bronze medalist(s)

== Modern pentathlon ==
Athlete	Event	Shooting (10 m air pistol)			Fencing (épée one touch)			Swimming (200 m freestyle)			Riding (show jumping)			Running (3000 m)			Total points	Final rank
Athlete	Event	Points	Rank	MP Points	Results	Rank	MP points	Time	Rank	MP points	Penalties	Rank	MP points	Time	Rank	MP Points	Total points	Final rank
Belinda Schreiber	Women's	188	1	1192	18–17	17	832	2:16.96	11	1280	28	9	1172	11:23.70	32	988	5464	11

== Rowing ==
Men

Athlete	Event	Heats		Quarterfinals		Semifinals		Final	
Athlete	Event	Time	Rank	Time	Rank	Time	Rank	Time	Rank
André Vonarburg	Single sculls	7:26.21	2 QF	7:02.29	3 SA/B	7:14.64	5 FB	7:13.07	9

Qualification Legend: FA=Final A (medal); FB=Final B (non-medal); FC=Final C (non-medal); FD=Final D (non-medal); FE=Final E (non-medal); FF=Final F (non-medal); SA/B=Semifinals A/B; SC/D=Semifinals C/D; SE/F=Semifinals E/F; QF=Quarterfinals; R=Repechage

== Sailing ==
Men

Athlete	Event	Race											Net points	Final rank
Athlete	Event	1	2	3	4	5	6	7	8	9	10	M*	Net points	Final rank
Richard Stauffacher	RS:X	9	11	11	13	9	18	15	8	17	~~22~~	EL	111	14
Christoph Bottoni	Laser	34	13	32	40	39	~~BFD~~	36	24	33	CAN	EL	241	37
Tobias Etter; Felix Steiger	470	21	23	5	25	7	~~OCS~~	27	26	9	19	EL	162	23
Enrico De Maria; Flavio Marazzi	Star	9	7	9	9	5	5	6	~~11~~	4	1	4	59	5

Women

Athlete	Event	Race											Net points	Final rank
Athlete	Event	1	2	3	4	5	6	7	8	9	10	M*	Net points	Final rank
Nathalie Brugger	Laser Radial	13	6	12	12	~~22~~	10	10	8	9	CAN	10	90	6
Emmanuelle Rol; Anne-Sophie Thilo	470	15	9	7	13	3	5	~~OCS~~	15	18	19	EL	114	17

M = Medal race; EL = Eliminated – did not advance into the medal race; CAN = Race cancelled

== Shooting ==
Men

Athlete	Event	Qualification		Final	
Athlete	Event	Points	Rank	Points	Rank
Simon Beyeler	10 m air rifle	583	45	Did not advance	
Simon Beyeler	50 m rifle prone	585	48	Did not advance	
Marcel Bürge	50 m rifle prone	590	32	Did not advance	
Marcel Bürge	50 m rifle 3 positions	1155	35	Did not advance	
Beat Müller	50 m rifle 3 positions	1164	21	Did not advance	
Christoph Schmid	10 m air pistol	573	33	Did not advance	
Christoph Schmid	50 m pistol	542	40	Did not advance	

Women

Athlete	Event	Qualification		Final	
Athlete	Event	Points	Rank	Points	Rank
Irene Beyeler	10 m air rifle	395	16	Did not advance	
Irene Beyeler	50 m rifle 3 positions	577	23	Did not advance	
Cornelia Frölich	10 m air pistol	381	17	Did not advance	
Sandra Kolly	10 m air pistol	378	27	Did not advance	
Sandra Kolly	25 m pistol	574	29	Did not advance	
Annik Marguet	10 m air rifle	391	33	Did not advance	
Annik Marguet	50 m rifle 3 positions	577	25	Did not advance	

== Swimming ==
Men

Athlete	Event	Heat		Semifinal		Final	
Athlete	Event	Time	Rank	Time	Rank	Time	Rank
Jonathan Massacand	100 m backstroke	55.21 NR	27	Did not advance			
Jonathan Massacand	200 m backstroke	2:01.80	32	Did not advance			
Dominik Meichtry	100 m freestyle	48.55	16 Q	49.58	16	Did not advance	
Dominik Meichtry	200 m freestyle	1:45.80	1 Q	1:46.54	7 Q	1:46.95	6
Dominik Meichtry	400 m freestyle	3:50.55	27	—N/a		Did not advance	
Flori Lang; Dominik Meichtry; Karel Novy; Adrien Perez	4 × 100 m freestyle relay	3:16.80	13	—N/a		Did not advance	

Women

Athlete	Event	Heat		Final	
Athlete	Event	Time	Rank	Time	Rank
Swann Oberson	10 km open water	—N/a		1:59:36.9	6
Flavia Rigamonti	400 m freestyle	4:09.59	14	Did not advance	
Flavia Rigamonti	800 m freestyle	8:28.67	13	Did not advance	

== Synchronized swimming ==
Athlete	Event	Technical routine		Free routine (preliminary)			Free routine (final)		
Athlete	Event	Points	Rank	Points	Total (technical + free)	Rank	Points	Total (technical + free)	Rank
Magdalena Brunner; Ariane Schneider	Duet	44.250	13	45.000	89.250	12 Q	45.000	89.250	12

== Taekwondo ==
Athlete	Event	Round of 16	Quarterfinals	Semifinals	Repechage	Bronze Medal	Final	
Athlete	Event	Opposition Result	Opposition Result	Opposition Result	Opposition Result	Opposition Result	Opposition Result	Rank
Manuela Bezzola	Women's −49 kg	Craig (USA); L 0–4	Did not advance					

== Tennis ==
Athlete	Event	Round of 64	Round of 32	Round of 16	Quarterfinals	Semifinals	Final / BM	
Athlete	Event	Opposition Score	Opposition Score	Opposition Score	Opposition Score	Opposition Score	Opposition Score	Rank
Roger Federer	Men's singles	Tursunov (RUS); W 6–4, 6–2	Arévalo (ESA); W 6–2, 6–4	Berdych (CZE); W 6–3, 7–6^{(7–4)}	Blake (USA); L 4–6, 6–7^{(2–7)}	Did not advance		
Stanislas Wawrinka	Men's singles	Dancevic (CAN); W 4–6, 6–3, 6–2	Melzer (AUT); L 4–6, 0–6	Did not advance				
Roger Federer; Stanislas Wawrinka	Men's doubles	—N/a	Bolelli / Seppi (ITA); W 7–5, 6–1	Tursunov / Youzhny (RUS); W 6–4, 6–3	Bhupathi / Paes (IND); W 6–2, 6–4	B Bryan / M Bryan (USA); W 7–6^{(8–6)}, 6–4	Aspelin / Johansson (SWE); W 6–3, 6–4, 6–7^{(4–7)}, 6–3	1st place, gold medalist(s)
Timea Bacsinszky	Women's singles	V Williams (USA); L 3–6, 2–6	Did not advance					
Patty Schnyder	Women's singles	Craybas (USA); W 6–3, 6–2	Bammer (AUT); L 4–6, 4–6	Did not advance				
Emmanuelle Gagliardi; Patty Schnyder	Women's doubles	—N/a	Daniilidou / Gerasimou (GRE); W 6–0, 6–4	Yan Z / Zheng J (CHN); L 3–6, 6–7^{(2–7)}	Did not advance			

== Triathlon ==
Athlete	Event	Swim (1.5 km)	Trans 1	Bike (40 km)	Trans 2	Run (10 km)	Total Time	Rank
Reto Hug	Men's	18:55	0:27	58:20	0:29	33:53	1:52:04.93	29
Olivier Marceau	Men's	18:55	0:29	58:18	0:31	32:37	1:50:50.07	19
Sven Riederer	Men's	18:14	0:34	58:52	0:28	33:11	1:51:19.45	23
Magali Chopard Di Marco	Women's	19:50	0:30	1:04:22	0:29	36:39	2:01:50.74	13
Daniela Ryf	Women's	19:56	0:26	1:04:17	0:30	35:31	2:00:40.20	7
Nicola Spirig	Women's	20:17	0:28	1:03:54	0:31	35:20	2:00:30.48	6

== Volleyball ==
=== Beach ===
Athlete	Event	Preliminary round	Standing	Round of 16	Quarterfinals	Semifinals	Final / BM	
Athlete	Event	Opposition Score	Standing	Opposition Score	Opposition Score	Opposition Score	Opposition Score	Rank
Patrick Heuscher; Sascha Heyer	Men's	Pool B Baracetti – Conde (ARG); W 2 – 0 (21–13, 21–17); Dalhausser – Rogers (USA); L 0 – 2 (15–21, 10–21); Pļaviņš – Samoilovs (LAT); L 1 – 2 (17–21, 23–21, 13–15); Lucky Losers; Gosch – Horst (AUT); L 0 – 2 (11–21, 19–21)	3	Did not advance				
Martin Laciga; Jan Schnider	Men's	Pool E Nummerdor – Schuil (NED); L 0 – 2 (14–21, 15–21); Klemperer – Koreng (GER); W 2 – 0 (21–15, 21–15); Kjemperud – Skarlund (NOR); W 2 – 0 (21–17, 21–13)	2 Q	Dalhausser – Rogers (USA); L 1 – 2 (16–21, 23–21, 13–15)	Did not advance			
Simone Kuhn; Lea Schwer	Women's	Pool E Tian J – Wang J (CHN); L 0 – 2 (12–21, 18–21); Glesnes – Maaseide (NOR); L 0 – 2 (11–21, 17–21); Mouha – van Breedam (BEL); L 0 – 2 (18–21, 17–21)	4	Did not advance				

== Wrestling ==
Key:

- VT - Victory by Fall.
- PP - Decision by Points - the loser with technical points.
- PO - Decision by Points - the loser without technical points.

Men's freestyle

Athlete	Event	Qualification	Round of 16	Quarterfinal	Semifinal	Repechage 1	Repechage 2	Final / BM	
Athlete	Event	Opposition Result	Opposition Result	Opposition Result	Opposition Result	Opposition Result	Opposition Result	Opposition Result	Rank
Grégory Sarrasin	−66 kg	Azizov (AZE); L 0–3 ^{PO}	Did not advance						21
