= Chile at the 2008 Summer Olympics =

- IOC code: CHI
- NOC: Chilean Olympic Committee
- Website: www.coch.cl (in Spanish)

in Beijing
- Competitors: 26 in 14 sports
- Flag bearer: Fernando González
- Medals Ranked 70th: Gold 0 Silver 1 Bronze 0 Total 1

Summer Olympics appearances (overview)
- ~~1896~~; 1900–1908; 1912; 1920; 1924; 1928; 1932; 1936; 1948; 1952; 1956; 1960; 1964; 1968; 1972; 1976; 1980; 1984; 1988; 1992; 1996; 2000; 2004; 2008; 2012; 2016; 2020; 2024; 2028

Chile competed in the 2008 Summer Olympics, held in Beijing, People's Republic of China from August 8 to August 24, 2008.

== Medalists ==
Medal	Name	Sport	Event
Silver	Fernando González	Tennis	Men's singles

== Athletics ==
Key

- Note–Ranks given for track events are within the athlete's heat only
- Q = Qualified for the next round
- q = Qualified for the next round as a fastest loser or, in field events, by position without achieving the qualifying target
- NR = National record
- N/A = Round not applicable for the event
- Bye = Athlete not required to compete in round

Men
Track & road events

Athlete	Event	Heat		Quarterfinal		Semifinal		Final	
Athlete	Event	Result	Rank	Result	Rank	Result	Rank	Result	Rank
Roberto Echeverría	Marathon	—N/a						2:23:54	49
Cristián Reyes	200 m	21.20	7	Did not advance					

Field events

Athlete	Event	Qualification		Final	
Athlete	Event	Distance	Position	Distance	Position
Ignacio Guerra	Javelin throw	73.03	24	Did not advance	
Marco Antonio Verni	Shot put	17.96	39	Did not advance	

Combined events – Decathlon

Athlete	Event	100 m	LJ	SP	HJ	400 m	110H	DT	PV	JT	1500 m	Final	Rank
Gonzalo Barroilhet	Result	11.33	7.08	13.23	1.93	51.91	14.26	46.07	NM	DNS	—	DNF	
Gonzalo Barroilhet	Points	789	833	681	740	729	941	789	0	0	—	DNF	

Women
Field events

Athlete	Event	Qualification		Final	
Athlete	Event	Distance	Position	Distance	Position
Natalia Duco	Shot put	17.40	22	Did not advance	

== Canoeing ==
=== Slalom ===
Athlete	Event	Preliminary						Semifinal		Final			
Athlete	Event	Run 1	Rank	Run 2	Rank	Total	Rank	Time	Rank	Time	Rank	Total	Rank
Pablo McCandless	Men's K-1	88.24	17	88.40	14	176.64	16	Did not advance					

== Cycling ==
=== Road ===
Athlete	Event	Time	Rank
Patricio Almonacid	Men's road race	Did not finish	
Gonzalo Garrido	Men's road race	6:36:48	70

=== Track ===
Omnium

Athlete	Event	Points	Laps	Rank
Marco Arriagada	Men's points race	1	0	18

=== Mountain biking ===
Athlete	Event	Time	Rank
Cristóbal Silva	Men's cross-country	LAP (2 laps)	36
Francisca Campos	Women's cross-country	LAP (2 laps)	25

== Equestrian ==
=== Eventing ===
Athlete	Horse	Event	Dressage		Cross-country			Jumping						Total	
Athlete	Horse	Event	Dressage		Cross-country			Qualifier			Final			Total	
Athlete	Horse	Event	Penalties	Rank	Penalties	Total	Rank	Penalties	Total	Rank	Penalties	Total	Rank	Penalties	Rank
Sergio Iturriaga	Lago Rupanco	Individual	63.00	60	Eliminated			Did not advance							

== Fencing ==
Men

Athlete	Event	Round of 64	Round of 32	Round of 16	Quarterfinal	Semifinal	Final / BM	
Athlete	Event	Opposition Score	Opposition Score	Opposition Score	Opposition Score	Opposition Score	Opposition Score	Rank
Paris Inostroza	Individual épée	Nishida (JPN); W 15–11	Fernández (VEN); L 10–15	Did not advance				

== Judo ==
Athlete	Event	Preliminary	Round of 32	Round of 16	Quarterfinals	Semifinals	Repechage 1	Repechage 2	Repechage 3	Final / BM	
Athlete	Event	Opposition Result	Opposition Result	Opposition Result	Opposition Result	Opposition Result	Opposition Result	Opposition Result	Opposition Result	Opposition Result	Rank
Felipe Novoa	Men's −66 kg	Bye	Casale (ITA); L 0000–1000	Did not advance							

== Modern pentathlon ==
Athlete	Event	Shooting (10 m air pistol)			Fencing (épée one touch)			Swimming (200 m freestyle)			Riding (show jumping)			Running (3000 m)			Total points	Final rank
Athlete	Event	Points	Rank	MP Points	Results	Rank	MP points	Time	Rank	MP points	Penalties	Rank	MP points	Time	Rank	MP Points	Total points	Final rank
Cristián Bustos	Men's	178	21	1072	12–23	33	688	2:15.26	35	1180	296	23	904	9:19.01	6	1164	5008	27

== Rowing ==
Men

Athlete	Event	Heats		Quarterfinals		Semifinals		Final	
Athlete	Event	Time	Rank	Time	Rank	Time	Rank	Time	Rank
Óscar Vásquez	Single sculls	7:39.58	3 QF	7:06.61	4 SC/D	7:17.17	2 FC	7:07.02	16

Women

Athlete	Event	Heats		Quarterfinals		Semifinals		Final	
Athlete	Event	Time	Rank	Time	Rank	Time	Rank	Time	Rank
Soraya Jadué	Single sculls	8:04.08	5 QF	7:51:52	4 SC/D	8:13.67	2 FC	7:48.35	17

Qualification Legend: FA=Final A (medal); FB=Final B (non-medal); FC=Final C (non-medal); FD=Final D (non-medal); FE=Final E (non-medal); FF=Final F (non-medal); SA/B=Semifinals A/B; SC/D=Semifinals C/D; SE/F=Semifinals E/F; QF=Quarterfinals; R=Repechage

== Sailing ==
Men

Athlete	Event	Race											Net points	Final rank
Athlete	Event	1	2	3	4	5	6	7	8	9	10	M*	Net points	Final rank
Matías del Solar	Laser	3	34	30	25	21	9	25	23	~~DNF~~	CAN	EL	170	25

M = Medal race; EL = Eliminated – did not advance into the medal race; CAN = Race cancelled

== Shooting ==
Men

Athlete	Event	Qualification		Final	
Athlete	Event	Points	Rank	Points	Rank
Jorge Atalah	Skeet	111	28	Did not advance	

== Swimming ==
Men

Athlete	Event	Heat		Semifinal		Final	
Athlete	Event	Time	Rank	Time	Rank	Time	Rank
Oliver Elliot	50 m freestyle	22.75	41	Did not advance			

Women

Athlete	Event	Heat		Final	
Athlete	Event	Time	Rank	Time	Rank
Kristel Köbrich	800 m freestyle	8:34.25	20	Did not advance	
Kristel Köbrich	10 km open water	—N/a		DNF	

== Tennis ==
Chile had qualified places in both men's singles and men's doubles. After winning the gold medal in Athens, Nicolás Massú received and accepted an invitation from the International Tennis Federation to compete at these Olympic games.

Athlete	Event	Round of 64	Round of 32	Round of 16	Quarterfinals	Semifinals	Final / BM	
Athlete	Event	Opposition Score	Opposition Score	Opposition Score	Opposition Score	Opposition Score	Opposition Score	Rank
Fernando González	Men's singles	Sun P (CHN); W 6–4, 6–4	Čilić (CRO); W 6–4, 6–2	Rochus (BEL); W 6–0, 6–3	Mathieu (FRA); W 6–4, 6–4	Blake (USA); W 4–6, 7–5, 11–9	Nadal (ESP); L 3–6, 6–7^{(2–7)}, 3–6	2nd place, silver medalist(s)
Nicolas Massú	Men's singles	Darcis (BEL); W 6–4, 7–5	Nalbandian (ARG); L 6–7^{(0–7)}, 1–6	Did not advance				
Fernando González; Nicolas Massú	Men's doubles	—N/a	Tursunov / Youzhny (RUS); L 6–7^{(5–7)}, 4–6	Did not advance				

== Triathlon ==
Athlete	Event	Swim (1.5 km)	Trans 1	Bike (40 km)	Trans 2	Run (10 km)	Total Time	Rank
Bárbara Riveros	Women's	20:21	0:28	1:26:52	0:34	36:16	2:03:42.56	25

== Weightlifting ==
Athlete	Event	Snatch		Clean & Jerk		Total	Rank
Athlete	Event	Result	Rank	Result	Rank	Total	Rank
Elizabeth Poblete	Women's −75 kg	91	12	106	12	197	8

== See also ==
- Chile at the 2007 Pan American Games
