= Equestrian at the 2008 Summer Olympics – Individual eventing =

Individual eventing at the Games of the XXIX Olympiad
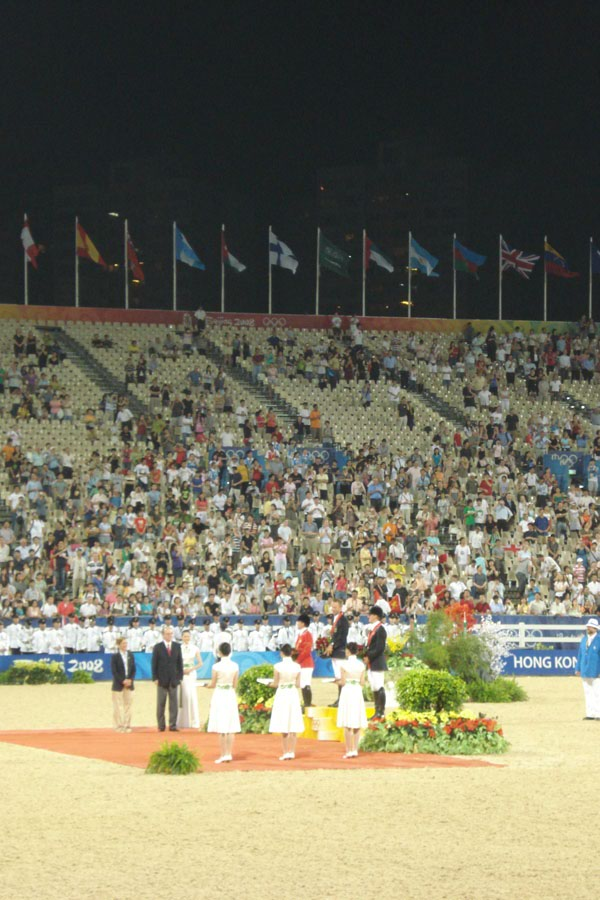
- Medal ceremony
- Venue: Hong Kong Sports Institute
- Date: 9–12 August
- Competitors: 74

Medalists
1st place, gold medalist(s)		Hinrich Romeike	Germany
2nd place, silver medalist(s)		Gina Miles	United States
3rd place, bronze medalist(s)		Kristina Cook	Great Britain

The individual eventing at the 2008 Summer Olympics took place between August 9 and 12 2008 at the Hong Kong Sports Institute.

Individual eventing consisted of four phases: dressage, cross-country, and two phases of show-jumping. Scores from each phase were converted into penalty points, which were summed to give a score.

In the dressage portion, the pair performed in front of three judges. The judges gave marks of between 0 and 10 for each of ten required elements; the scores for the judges were averaged to give a score between 0 and 100. That score was then subtracted from 100 and multiplied by 1.5 to give the number of penalty points.

The cross-county portion consisted of a 4.56 kilometer course with 29 obstacles. The target time was eight minutes; pairs received .4 penalty points for every second above that time. They also received 20 penalty points for every obstacle not cleanly jumped.

The final phases were show-jumping; pairs had to negotiate a course of obstacles. The pair received 4 penalty points for each obstacle at which there was a refusal or a knockdown of the obstacle. One penalty point was also assessed for each second taken above the maximum time for the course.

The top 25 pairs after the first jumping portion (limited to three pairs per nation) took part in a second phase of jumping; the scores from this jumping final were added to the scores of the first three phases to give a grand final.

The results of the individual phase were also used in the team eventing event, though that event did not use the second jumping phase.

== Medalists ==
Gold		Silver		Bronze	
Germany		United States		Great Britain	
Hinrich Romeike	Marius	Gina Miles	McKinlaigh	Kristina Cook	Miners Frolic

== Results ==
The total score for each horse and rider was the sum of the total penalty points earned in the various phases of competitions. The pair with the lowest number of penalty points was victorious.

=== Summary ===
Rank	Rider	Horse	Nation	Dressage	Cross Country	Jumping	Total after Jumping 1	Final Jumping	Total
1st place, gold medalist(s)	Hinrich Romeike	Marius	Germany	37.40	12.80	4	54.20	-	54.20
2nd place, silver medalist(s)	Gina Miles	McKinlaigh	United States	39.30	16.80	-	56.10	-	56.10
3rd place, bronze medalist(s)	Kristina Cook	Miners Frolic	Great Britain	40.20	17.20	-	57.40	-	57.40
4	Megan Jones	Irish Jester	Australia	35.40	15.60	4	55.00	4	59.00
5	Ingrid Klimke	Abraxxas	Germany	33.50	17.20	4	54.70	5	59.70
6	Didier Dhennin	Ismene du Temple	France	42.80	14.00	3	59.80	-	59.80
7	Clayton Fredericks	Ben Along Time	Australia	37.00	16.40	4	57.40	4	61.40
8	Andreas Dibowski	Butts Leon	Germany	39.60	17.60	-	57.20	8	65.20
9	Karin Donckers	Gazelle de la Brasserie	Belgium	31.70	25.60	4	61.30	4	65.30
10	Sonja Johnson	Ringwould Jaguar	Australia	45.20	13.60	-	58.80	8	66.80
11	Mary King	Call Again Cavalier	Great Britain	38.10	18.00	8	64.10	4	68.10
12	William Fox-Pitt	Parkmore Ed	Great Britain	50.20	10.00	4	64.20	4	68.20
13	Linda Algotsson	Stand By Me	Sweden	41.50	22.80	-	68.30	4	68.30
14	Caroline Powell	Lenamore	New Zealand	48.00	21.20	4	69.20	-	73.20
15	Tim Lips	Oncarlos	Netherlands	52.60	22.40	-	75.00	-	75.00
16	Vittoria Panizzon	Rock Model	Italy	50.60	18.40	-	69.00	8	77.00
17	Mark Todd	Gandalf	New Zealand	49.40	27.20	1	77.60	-	77.60
18	Katrin Norling	Pandora	Sweden	52.00	16.00	5	73.00	8	81.00
19	Pawel Spisak	Weriusz	Poland	48.70	34.00	-	82.70	-	82.70
20	Eric Vigeanel	Coronado Prior	France	53.00	26.00	-	79.00	4	83.00
21	Austin O'Connor	Hobby du Mee	Ireland	52.80	34.40	-	87.20	-	87.20
22	Marcelo Tosi	Super Rocky	Brazil	64.80	24.80	-	89.60	-	89.60
23	Susanna Bordone	Ava	Italy	37.80	28.80	20	86.60	14	100.60
24	Joe Meyer	Snip	New Zealand	43.90	21.20	25	90.10	12	102.10
25	Frank Ostholt	Mr. Medicott	Germany	44.60	13.20	-	57.80		
26	Lucinda Fredericks	Headley Britannia	Australia	30.40	27.20	2	59.60		
27	Shane Rose	All Luck	Australia	53.30	9.20	8	70.50		
28	Daisy Dick	Spring Along	Great Britain	51.70	17.20	11	79.90		
29	Roberto Rotatori	Irham de Viages	Italy	40.00	22.80	28	90.80		
30	Sandra Donnelly	Buenos Aires	Canada	60.20	24.00	8	92.20		
31	Dag Albert	Tubber Rebel	Sweden	65.60	27.60	-	93.20		
32	Geoffrey Curran	Kilkishen	Ireland	61.70	30.40	2	94.10		
33	Louise Lyons	Watership Down	Ireland	57.40	28.40	9	94.80		
34	Sharon Hunt	Tankers Town	Great Britain	43.50	47.60	4	95.10		
35	Kyle Carter	Madison Park	Canada	63.50	18.40	14	95.90		
36	Tiziana Realini	Gamour	Switzerland	48.90	32.80	16	97.70		
37	Peter Thomsen	The Ghost of Hamish	Germany	53.30	45.60	4			
38	Niall Griffin	Lorgaine	Ireland	50.60	46.40	12	109.00		
39	Jeferson Moreira	Escudeiro	Brazil	55.90	50.80	4	110.70		
40	Stefano Brecciaroli	Cappa Hill	Italy	50.00	62.00	4	116.00		
41	Fabio Magni	Southern King V	Italy	49.60	70.00	-			
42	Rebecca Holder	Courageous Comet	United States	35.70	82.00	8			
43	Patricia Ryan	Fernhill Clover Mist	Ireland	78.70	34.80	13			
44	Karen O'Connor	Mandiba	United States	41.90	84.80	5			
45	Selena O'Hanlon	Colombo	Canada	44.10	76.80	12			
46	Joris Vanspringel	Bold Action	Belgium	52.00	66.40	15			
47	Andre Paro	Land Heir	Brazil	59.60	39.20	35			
48	Valery Martyshev	Kinzhal	Russia	64.40	60.40	12			
49	Yoshiaki Oiwa	Gorgeous George	Japan	52.40	76.40	8			
50	Heelan Tompkins	Sugoi	New Zealand	55.60	75.20	8			
51	Mike Winter	King Pin	Canada	48.90	76.80	20			
52	Artur Spolowicz	Wag	Poland	57.00	74.40	23			
53	Vyacheslav Poyto	Energiya	Belarus	59.10	75.60	31			
54	Alena Tseliapushkina	Passat	Belarus	77.40	59.60	30			
55	Samantha Taylor	Livewire	Canada	70.70	109.60	8			
	Samantha Albert	Before I Do It	Jamaica	56.30	41.60	EL			
	Peter Flarup	Silver Ray	Denmark	53.10	13.20	WD			
	Viktoria Carlerback	Bally's Geronimo	Sweden	46.50	26.40	WD			
	Magnus Gallerdal	Keymaster	Sweden	54.60	13.60	WD			
	Amy Tryon	Poggio II	United States	46.50	EL				
	Igor Atrokhov	Elkasar	Russia	65.20	EL				
	Jaroslav Hatla	Karla	Czech Republic	52.80	EL				
	Sergio Iturriaga	Lago Rupanco	Chile	63.00	EL				
	Alex Hua Tian	Chico	China	49.60	EL				
	Andrew Nicholson	Lord Killinghurst	New Zealand	44.60	EL				
	Saulo Tristao	Totsie	Brazil	79.60	EL				
	Jean Renaud Adde	Haston d'Elpegere	France	56.90	EL				
	Harald Ambros	Quick	Austria	55.70	WD				
	Nicolas Touzaint	Galan de Sauvagere	France	WD					
	Phillip Dutton	Connaught	United States	DSQ					

- Phillip Dutton qualified for the final show jumping event round on 68.2 faults (sixteenth place) and jumped a clear round to move up to twelfth place, but was disqualified because weighted boots worn by his horse exceeded the maximum limit.
- Four riders did not qualify for the final jumping round as three others from their nation had already qualified, The positions of these riders after the first jumping round (and after Dutton's disqualification) were: Frank Osholt (8th), Lucinda fredericks (10th), Shane Rose (17th) and Daisy Dick (23rd).

=== Dressage ===
For the dressage portion of the competition, horse and rider pairs performed series of movements that were evaluated by judges. Judges gave marks of 0 to 10 for each movement, subtracting points for errors. The score for each judge was represented by a percentage of marks possible that were gained. Scores from the three judges were averaged for an overall percentage. This was then subtracted from 100 and multiplied by 1.5 to determine the number of penalty points awarded for the round.

Rank	Rider	Horse	Nation	Judge E	Judge C	Judge M	Score	Penalty Points
1	Lucinda Fredericks	Headley Britannia	Australia	82.22	78.52	78.52	78.52	30.4
2	Karin Donckers	Gazelle de la Brasserie	Belgium	80.00	80.37	76.30	78.34	31.7
3	Ingrid Klimke	Abraxxas	Germany	78.52	78.89	75.56		33.5
4	Megan Jones	Irish Jester	Australia	76.30	78.15	74.81	76.48	35.4
5	Rebecca Holder	Courageous Comet	United States	75.56	75.93	77.04	76.49	35.7
6	Clayton Fredericks	Ben Along Time	Australia	78.15	72.22	75.56	73.89	37.0
7	Hinrich Romeike	Marius	Germany	75.19	74.44	75.56	75.00	37.4
8	Susanna Bordone	Ava	Italy	74.81	74.81	74.81	74.81	37.8
9	Mary King	Call Again Cavalier	Great Britain	74.44	74.07	75.19		38.1
10	Gina Miles	McKinlaigh	United States	74.81	74.44	72.22	73.33	39.3
11	Andreas Dibowski	Butts Leon	Germany	73.33	72.59	74.81		39.6
12	Roberto Rotatori	Irham de Viages	Italy	74.81	75.56	69.63		40.0
13	Kristina Cook	Miners Frolic	Great Britain	74.81	73.33	71.48	72.41	40.2
14	Phillip Dutton	Connaught	United States	72.22	70.74	75.93		40.6
15	Linda Algotsson	Stand By Me	Sweden	75.19	71.48	70.37	70.93	41.5
16	Karen O'Connor	Mandiba	United States	71.11	70.74	74.44		41.9
17	Didier Dhennin	Ismene du Temple	France	71.85	71.48	71.11	71.30	42.8
18	Sharon Hunt	Tankers Town	Great Britain	71.11	69.63	72.22		43.5
19	Joe Meyer	Snip	New Zealand	68.89	71.11	72.22		43.9
20	Selena O'Hanlon	Colombo	Canada	68.89	73.33	69.63	71.48	44.1
21	Frank Ostholt	Mr. Medicott	Germany	70.00	69.63	71.11	70.37	44.6
21	Andrew Nicholson	Lord Killinghurst	New Zealand	71.11	70.00	69.63	69.82	44.6
23	Sonja Johnson	Ringwould Jaguar	Australia	70.00	70.00	69.63		45.2
24	Amy Tryon	Poggio II	United States	69.63	70.74	66.67	68.71	46.5
24	Viktoria Carlerback	Bally's Geronimo	Sweden	69.63	68.15	69.26	68.71	46.5
26	Caroline Powell	Lenamore	New Zealand	68.52	65.93	69.63		48.0
27	Pawel Spisak	Weriusz	Poland	68.89	68.15	65.56	66.86	48.7
28	Tiziana Realini	Gamour	Switzerland	66.30	68.15	67.78		48.9
28	Mike Winter	King Pin	Canada	66.30	66.67	69.26		48.9
30	Mark Todd	Gandalf	New Zealand	65.56	67.78	67.78	67.78	49.4
31	Alex Hua Tian	Chico	China	69.63	68.52	62.59	65.56	49.6
31	Fabio Magni	Southern King V	Italy	65.56	65.93	69.26	67.60	49.6
33	Stefano Brecciaroli	Cappa Hill	Italy	67.04	65.56	67.41	66.49	50.0
34	William Fox-Pitt	Parkmore Ed	Great Britain	65.56	68.15	65.93	67.04	50.2
35	Vittoria Panizzon	Rock Model	Italy	66.30	67.41	65.19	66.30	50.6
35	Niall Griffin	Lorgaine	Ireland	65.93	66.67	66.30		50.6
37	Daisy Dick	Spring Along	Great Britain	66.30	65.56	64.81	65.19	51.7
38	Katrin Norling	Pandora	Sweden	65.56	63.33	67.04	65.19	52.0
38	Joris Vanspringel	Bold Action	Belgium	66.30	63.33	66.30		52.0
40	Oiwa Yoshiaki	Gorgeous George	Japan	65.93	63.70	65.56	64.63	52.4
41	Tim Lips	Oncarlos	Netherlands	66.67	65.56	62.59		52.6
42	Austin O'Connor	Hobby du Mee	Ireland	65.93	64.44	64.07	64.26	52.8
42	Jaroslav Hatla	Karla	Czech Republic	66.67	62.59	65.19	63.89	52.8
44	Eric Vigeanel	Coronado Prior	France	64.44	65.19	64.44		53.0
45	Peter Flarup	Silver Ray	Denmark	62.96	65.56	65.19	65.38	53.1
46	Peter Thomsen	The Ghost of Hamish	Germany	63.70	64.44	65.19	64.82	53.3
46	Shane Rose	All Luck	Australia	65.19	62.59	65.56		53.3
48	Magnus Gallerdal	Keymaster	Sweden	65.56	64.81	60.37		54.6
49	Heelan Tompkins	Sugoi	New Zealand	64.07	60.74	64.07	62.41	55.6
50	Harald Ambros	Quick	Austria	61.85	63.33	63.33	63.33	55.7
51	Jeferson Moreira	Escudeiro	Brazil	59.63	62.59	65.93	64.26	55.9
52	Samantha Albert	Before I Do It	Jamaica	62.22	63.33	61.85	62.59	56.3
53	Jean Renaud Adde	Haston d'Elpegere	France	60.37	62.96	62.96		56.9
54	Artur Spolowicz	Wag	Poland	60.00	64.07	61.85	62.96	57.0
55	Louise Lyons	Watership Down	Ireland	61.11	60.00	64.07	62.04	57.4
56	Viachaslau Poita	Energiya	Belarus	58.89	60.74	62.22	61.48	59.1
57	Andre Paro	Land Heir	Brazil	58.52	59.63	62.59		59.6
58	Sandra Donnelly	Buenos Aires	Canada	59.63	59.63	60.37	60.00	60.2
59	Geoffrey Curran	Kilkishen	Ireland	58.52	57.04	61.11	59.08	61.7
60	Sergio Iturriaga	Lago Rupanco	Chile	58.52	57.78	57.78	57.78	63.0
61	Kyle Carter	Madison Park	Canada	58.15	56.67	58.15	57.41	63.5
62	Valery Martyshev	Kinzhal	Russia	55.93	57.04	58.15	57.60	64.4
63	Marcelo Tosi	Super Rocky	Brazil	55.93	55.19	59.26	57.23	64.8
64	Igor Atrohov	Elkasar	Russia	55.56	54.07	60.00	57.04	65.2
65	Dag Albert	Tubber Rebel	Sweden	55.56	56.67	56.67		65.6
66	Samantha Taylor	Livewire	Canada	51.85	52.96	53.70		70.7
67	Alena Tseliapushkina	Passat	Belarus	48.52	45.93	50.74		77.4
68	Patricia Ryan	Fernhill Clover Mist	Ireland	47.78	47.04	47.78		78.7
69	Saulo Tristao	Totsie	Brazil	46.30	45.56	48.89	47.23	79.6
—	Nicolas Touzaint	Galan de Sauvagere	France	Withdrew				1000.00

=== Cross country ===
The cross-county portion consisted of a 4.56 kilometer course with 29 obstacles. The target time was eight minutes; pairs received .4 penalty points for every second above that time. They also received 20 penalty points for every obstacle not cleanly jumped.

Rank	Rider	Horse	Nation	Time	Time Penalties	Jump Penalties	Dressage Score	Total
1	Hinrich Romeike	Marius	Germany	8:32	12.80	0.00	37.40	50.20
2	Ingrid Klimke	Abraxxas	Germany	8:43	17.20	0.00	33.50	50.70
3	Megan Jones	Irish Jester	Australia	8:39	15.60	0.00	35.40	51.00
4	Clayton Fredericks	Ben Along Time	Australia	8:41	16.40	0.00	37.00	53.40
5	Gina Miles	Mckinlaigh	United States	8:42	16.80	0.00	39.30	56.10
5	Mary King	Call Again Cavalier	Great Britain	8:45	18.00	0.00	38.10	56.10
7	Didier Dhennin	Ismene Du Temple	France	8:35	14.00	0.00	42.80	56.80
8	Andreas Dibowski	Butts Leon	Germany	8:44	17.60	0.00	39.60	57.20
9	Karin Donckers	Gazelle De La Brasserie	Belgium	9:04	25.60	0.00	31.70	57.30
10	Kristina Cook	Miners Frolic	Great Britain	8:43	17.20	0.00	40.20	57.40
11	Lucina Fredericks	Headley Britannia	Australia	9:08	27.20	0.00	30.40	57.60
12	Frank Ostholt	Mr. Medicott	Germany	8:33	13.20	0.00	44.60	57.80
13	Sonja Johnson	Ringwould Jaguar	Australia	8:34	13.60	0.00	45.20	58.80
14	William Fox-Pitt	Parkmore Ed	Great Britain	8:25	10.00	0.00	50.20	60.20
14	Phillip Dutton	Connaught	United States	8:49	19.60	0.00	40.60	60.20
16	Shane Rose	All Luck	Australia	8:23	9.20	0.00	53.30	62.50
17	Roberto Rotatori	Irham De Viages	Italy	8:57	22.80	0.00	40.00	62.80
18	Linda Algotsson	Stand By Me	Sweden	8:57	22.80	0.00	41.50	64.30
19	Joe Meyer	Snip	New Zealand	8:53	21.20	0.00	43.90	65.10
20	Peter Flarup	Silver Ray	Denmark	8:33	13.20	0.00	53.10	66.30
21	Susanna Bordone	Ava	Italy	9:12	28.80	0.00	37.80	66.60
22	Katrin Norling	Pandora	Sweden	8:40	16.00	0.00	52.00	68.00
23	Magnus Gallerdal	Keymaster	Sweden	8:34	13.60	0.00	54.60	68.20
24	Daisy Dick	Spring Along	Great Britain	8:43	17.20	0.00	51.70	68.90
25	Vittoria Panizzon	Rock Model	Italy	8:46	18.40	0.00	50.60	69.00
26	Caroline Powell	Lenamore	New Zealand	8:53	21.20	0.00	48.00	69.20
27	Viktoria Carlerback	Bally's Geronimo	Sweden	9:06	26.40	0.00	46.50	72.90
28	Tim Lips	Oncarlos	Netherlands	8:56	22.40	0.00	52.60	75.00
29	Mark Todd	Gandalf	New Zealand	9:08	27.20	0.00	49.40	76.60
30	Eric Vigeanel	Coronado Prior	France	9:05	26.00	0.00	53.00	79.00
31	Tiziana Realini	Gamour	Switzerland	9:22	32.80	0.00	48.90	81.70
32	Kyle Carter	Madison Park	Canada	8:46	18.40	0.00	63.50	81.90
33	Pawel Spisak	Weriusz	Poland	9:25	34.00	0.00	48.70	82.70
34	Sandra Donnelly	Buenos Aires	Canada	9:00	24.00	0.00	60.20	84.20
35	Louise Lyons	Watership Down	Ireland	9:11	28.40	0.00	57.40	85.80
36	Austin O'Connor	Hobby Du Mee	Ireland	9:26	34.40	0.00	52.80	87.20
37	Marcelo Tosi	Super Rocky	Brazil	9:02	24.80	0.00	64.80	89.60
38	Sharon Hunt	Tankers Town	Great Britain	9:09	27.60	20.00	43.50	91.10
39	Geoffrey Curran	Kilkishen	Ireland	9:16	30.40	0.00	61.70	92.10
40	Dag Albert	Tubber Rebel	Sweden	9:09	27.60	0.00	65.60	93.20
41	Niall Griffin	Lorgaine	Ireland	9:06	26.40	20.00	50.60	97.00
42	Samantha Albert	Before I Do It	Jamaica	9:44	41.60	0.00	56.30	97.90
43	Andre Paro	Land Heir	Brazil	9:38	39.20	0.00	98.80	
44	Peter Thomsen	The Ghost Of Hamish	Germany	9:04	25.60	20.00	98.90	
45	Jeferson Moreira	Escudeiro	Brazil	10:07	50.80	0.00	55.90	106.70
46	Stefano Brecciaroli	Cappa Hill	Italy	9:45	42.00	20.00	50.00	112.00
47	Patricia Ryan	Fernhill Clover Mist	Ireland	9:27	34.80	0.00	78.70	113.50
48	Rebecca Holder	Courageous Comet	United States	8:55	22.00	60.00	35.70	117.70
49	Joris Vanspringel	Bold Action	Belgium	9:56	46.40	20.00	52.00	118.40
50	Fabio Magni	Southern King V	Italy	10:05	50.00	20.00	49.60	117.70
51	Selena O'Hanlon	Colombo	Canada					
52	Valery Martyshev	Kinzhal	Russia					
53	Mike Winter	King Pin	Canada					
54	Karen O'Connor	Mandiba	United States					
55	Yoshiaki Oiwa	Gorgeous George	Japan					
56	Heelan Tompkins	Sugoi	New Zealand					
57	Artur Spolowicz	Wag	Poland					
58	Viachaslau Poita	Energiya	Belarus					
59	Alena Tseliapushkina	Passat	Belarus					
60	Samantha Taylor	Livewire	Canada					
—	Amy Tryon	Poggio II	United States	Eliminated				1000.00
—	Igor Atrohov	Elkasar	Russia	Eliminated				-
—	Jaroslav Hatla	Karla	Czech Republic	Eliminated				-
—	Sergio Iturriaga	Lago Rupanco	Chile	Eliminated				-
—	Alex Hua Tian	Chico	China	Eliminated				-
—	Andrew Nicholson	Lord Killinghurst	New Zealand	Eliminated				1000.00
—	Saulo Tristao	Totsie	Brazil	Eliminated				1000.00
—	Jean Renaud Adde	Haston D'Elpegere	France	Eliminated				1000.00
—	Harald Ambros	Quick	Austria	Withdrew				-
—	Nicolas Touzaint	Galan de Sauvagere	France	Withdrew				1000.00
