= Sweden at the 2008 Summer Olympics =

- IOC code: SWE
- NOC: Swedish Olympic Committee
- Website: www.sok.se (in Swedish and English)

in Beijing
- Competitors: 124 in 19 sports
- Flag bearers: Christian Olsson (opening); Jörgen Persson (closing)
- Medals Ranked 55th: Gold 0 Silver 4 Bronze 1 Total 5

Summer Olympics appearances (overview)
- 1896; 1900; 1904; 1908; 1912; 1920; 1924; 1928; 1932; 1936; 1948; 1952; 1956; 1960; 1964; 1968; 1972; 1976; 1980; 1984; 1988; 1992; 1996; 2000; 2004; 2008; 2012; 2016; 2020; 2024; 2028

Other related appearances
- 1906 Intercalated Games

Sweden sent a team to compete at the 2008 Summer Olympics in Beijing, People's Republic of China.

This is a list of all of the Swedish athletes who participated in the Olympics.

== Medalists ==
Medal	Name	Sport	Event	Date
Silver	Emma Johansson	Cycling	Women's road race	10 August
Silver	Gustav Larsson	Cycling	Men's time trial	13 August
Silver	Simon Aspelin; Thomas Johansson	Tennis	Men's doubles	16 August
Silver	Rolf-Göran Bengtsson	Equestrian	Individual jumping	21 August
Bronze	Anders Ekström; Fredrik Lööf	Sailing	Star class	21 August

== Competitors ==
The following is the list of number of competitors participating in the Games.

Sport	Men	Women	Total
Archery	1	0	1
Athletics	8	4	12
Badminton	0	1	1
Boxing	2	0	2
Canoeing	2	1	3
Cycling	5	3	8
Diving	0	2	2
Equestrian	6	6	12
Fencing	0	1	1
Football	0	18	18
Handball	0	14	14
Rowing	1	1	2
Sailing	8	3	11
Shooting	1	1	2
Swimming	8	11	19
Table tennis	3	0	0
Taekwondo	0	2	2
Tennis	4	1	5
Triathlon	0	1	1
Wrestling	2	3	5
Total	51	73	124

Swedish Olympic Committee's website lists 131 participants. Their count also includes reserves: Emma Karlsson and Linda Heed in equestrian, 3 reserves in women's football team, 1 reserve in women's handball team and Robert Svensson in men's table tennis team.

Neither count includes Alexandra Engen who was qualified and selected and was practicing on the Olympic course when she fell and was injured, which caused her to miss the competition.

== Archery ==
Athlete	Event	Ranking round		Round of 64	Round of 32	Round of 16	Quarterfinals	Semifinals	Final / BM	
Athlete	Event	Score	Seed	Opposition Score	Opposition Score	Opposition Score	Opposition Score	Opposition Score	Opposition Score	Rank
Magnus Petersson	Men's individual	646	49	Duenas (CAN) (16); W 108 (19)–108 (18)	Kunda (BLR) (48); L 110–112	Did not advance				

== Athletics ==
Key

- Note–Ranks given for track events are within the athlete's heat only
- Q = Qualified for the next round
- q = Qualified for the next round as a fastest loser or, in field events, by position without achieving the qualifying target
- NR = National record
- N/A = Round not applicable for the event
- Bye = Athlete not required to compete in round

Men
Track & road events

Athlete	Event	Heat		Semifinal		Final	
Athlete	Event	Result	Rank	Result	Rank	Result	Rank
Mustafa Mohamed	3000 m steeplechase	8:17.80	5 q	—N/a		8:20.69	10
Johan Wissman	400 m	44.81	3 Q	44.64	3 q	45.39	8

Field events

Athlete	Event	Qualification		Final	
Athlete	Event	Distance	Position	Distance	Position
Niklas Arrhenius	Discus throw	58.22	15	Did not advance	
Magnus Arvidsson	Javelin throw	79.70	12 q	80.16	11
Jesper Fritz	Pole vault	5.45	24	Did not advance	
Stefan Holm	High jump	2.29	=6 Q	2.32	4
Alhaji Jeng	Pole vault	5.55	14	Did not advance	
Linus Thörnblad	High jump	2.20	26	Did not advance	

Women
Track & road events

Athlete	Event	Heat		Semifinal		Final	
Athlete	Event	Result	Rank	Result	Rank	Result	Rank
Susanna Kallur	100 m hurdles	12.68	2 Q	DNF		Did not advance	

Field events

Athlete	Event	Qualification		Final	
Athlete	Event	Distance	Position	Distance	Position
Emma Green	High jump	1.93	13 q	1.96	9
Carolina Klüft	Long jump	6.70	5 q	6.49	9
Carolina Klüft	Triple jump	13.97	20	Did not advance	
Anna Söderberg	Discus throw	55.28	31	Did not advance	

== Badminton ==
Athlete	Event	Round of 64	Round of 32	Round of 16	Quarterfinal	Semifinal	Final / BM	
Athlete	Event	Opposition Score	Opposition Score	Opposition Score	Opposition Score	Opposition Score	Opposition Score	Rank
Sara Persson	Women's singles	Nedelcheva (BUL); L 10–21, 10–21	Did not advance					

== Boxing ==
Athlete	Event	Round of 32	Round of 16	Quarterfinals	Semifinals	Final	
Athlete	Event	Opposition Result	Opposition Result	Opposition Result	Opposition Result	Opposition Result	Rank
Naim Terbunja	Middleweight	Korobov (RUS); L 6–18	Did not advance				
Kennedy Katende	Light heavyweight	Beterbiyev (RUS); L 3–15	Did not advance				

== Canoeing ==
=== Sprint ===
Athlete	Event	Heats		Semifinals		Final	
Athlete	Event	Time	Rank	Time	Rank	Time	Rank
Anders Gustafsson	Men's K-1 500 m	1:36.633	3 QS	1:42.409	2 Q	1:38.447	7
Markus Oscarsson	Men's K-1 1000 m	3:30.044	3 QS	3:33.906	3 Q	3:30.198	6
Anders Gustafsson; Markus Oscarsson	Men's K-2 1000 m	DSQ		Did not advance			
Sofia Paldanius	Women's K-1 500 m	1:51.110	4 QS	1:53.797	5	Did not advance	

Qualification Legend: QS = Qualify to semi-final; QF = Qualify directly to final

== Cycling ==
=== Road ===
Men

Athlete	Event	Time	Rank
Gustav Larsson	Road race	6:26:17	24
Gustav Larsson	Time trial	1:02:44	2nd place, silver medalist(s)
Thomas Lövkvist	Road race	6:26:25	38
Marcus Ljungqvist	Road race	6:34:26	58

Women

Athlete	Event	Time	Rank
Emma Johansson	Road race	3:32:24	2nd place, silver medalist(s)
Emma Johansson	Time trial	38:28.83	21
Susanne Ljungskog	Road race	3:32:52	21
Susanne Ljungskog	Time trial	36:33.50	10
Sara Mustonen	Road race	3:43:25	56

=== Mountain biking ===
Athlete	Event	Time	Rank
Fredrik Kessiakoff	Men's cross-country	2:03:09	17
Emil Lindgren	Men's cross-country	LAP (2 laps)	38

Alexandra Engen was scheduled to participate in women's cross-country. However, she was injured during the practice on the Olympic course and was unable to compete due to that.

== Diving ==
Women

Athlete	Events	Preliminaries		Semifinals		Final	
Athlete	Events	Points	Rank	Points	Rank	Points	Rank
Anna Lindberg	3 m springboard	294.75	12 Q	324.70	9 Q	342.15	6
Elina Eggers	10 m platform	309.45	16 Q	315.45	9 Q	285.85	12

== Equestrian ==
=== Dressage ===
Athlete	Horse	Event	Grand Prix		Grand Prix Special		Grand Prix Freestyle		Overall	
Athlete	Horse	Event	Score	Rank	Score	Rank	Score	Rank	Score	Rank
Jan Brink	Briar	Individual	68.875	13 Q	68.960	13 Q	73.450	9	71.205	10
Patrik Kittel	Floresco	Individual	67.125	18 Q	64.360	24	Did not advance			
Tinne Vilhelmsson-Silfvén	Solos Carex	Individual	66.042	23 Q	69.240	11 Q	71.450	12	70.345	12
Jan Brink; Patrik Kittel; Tinne Vilhelmsson-Silfvén	See above	Team	67.347	5	—N/a				67.347	4

Emma Karlsson was a reserve.

=== Eventing ===
Athlete	Horse	Event	Dressage		Cross-country			Jumping						Total	
Athlete	Horse	Event	Dressage		Cross-country			Qualifier			Final			Total	
Athlete	Horse	Event	Penalties	Rank	Penalties	Total	Rank	Penalties	Total	Rank	Penalties	Total	Rank	Penalties	Rank
Dag Albert	Tubber Rebel	Individual	65.60 #	65	27.60	93.20 #	40	0.00	93.20	31	Did not advance			93.20	32
Linda Algotsson	Stand By Me	Individual	41.50	15	22.80	64.30	18	0.00	64.30	15 Q	4.00	68.30	13	68.30	13
Viktoria Carlerbäck	Bally's Geronimo	Individual	46.50	24	26.40	72.90 #	27	Withdrew							
Magnus Gällerdal	Keymaster	Individual	54.60 #	48	13.60	68.20	23	Withdrew							
Katrin Norling	Pandora	Individual	52.00	38	16.00	68.00	22	5.00	73.00	19 Q	8.00	81.00	18	81.00	22
Dag Albert; Linda Algotsson; Viktoria Carlerbäck; Magnus Gällerdal; Katrin Norling	See above	Team	140.00	7	60.50	200.50	5	30.00	230.50	4	—N/a			230.50	4

# - Indicates that points do not count in team total

=== Show jumping ===
Athlete	Horse	Event	Qualification								Final					Total	
Athlete	Horse	Event	Round 1		Round 2			Round 3			Round A		Round B			Total	
Athlete	Horse	Event	Penalties	Rank	Penalties	Total	Rank	Penalties	Total	Rank	Penalties	Rank	Penalties	Total	Rank	Penalties	Rank
Rolf-Göran Bengtsson	Ninja	Individual	4	30	0	4	8 Q	4	8	8 Q	0	=1 Q	0	0	=1 JO	4	2nd place, silver medalist(s)
Peter Eriksson	Jaguar Mail	Individual	8	49	8	16	35 Q	4	20	27 Q	16	33	Did not advance			16	33
Helena Lundbäck	Erbblume	Individual	8	49	12	20	47 Q	17	37	42	Did not advance					37	42
Lotta Schultz	Calibra II	Individual	5	39	5	10	26 Q	20	30	40 Q	4	11 Q	13	17	19	17	19
Rolf-Göran Bengtsson; Peter Eriksson; Helena Lundbäck; Lotta Schultz	See above	Team	—N/a								13	3 Q	25	38	8	38	8

Linda Heed was reserve.

== Fencing ==
Women

Athlete	Event	Round of 32	Round of 16	Quarterfinal	Semifinal	Final / BM	
Athlete	Event	Opposition Score	Opposition Score	Opposition Score	Opposition Score	Opposition Score	Rank
Emma Samuelsson	Individual épée	Logounova (RUS); W 15–6	Picot (FRA); W 15–13	Heidemann (GER); L 10–15	Did not advance		

== Football ==
Summary

Key:

- W – Win D – Draw L – Loss
- A.E.T – After extra time.
- P – Match decided by penalty-shootout.

Team	Event	Group Stage				Quarterfinal	Semifinal	Final / BM	
Team	Event	Opposition Score	Opposition Score	Opposition Score	Rank	Opposition Score	Opposition Score	Opposition Score	Rank
Sweden women's	Women's tournament	China; L 1–2	Argentina; W 1–0	Canada; W 2–1	2 Q	Germany; L 0–2 (a.e.t.)	Did not advance		6

=== Women's tournament ===
Roster

Head coach: Thomas Dennerby

Sweden named a squad of 18 players and 4 alternates for the tournament. During the tournament, Maria Aronsson replaced Josefine Öqvist on 12 August 2008 due to injury.

No.	Pos.	Player	Date of birth (age)	Caps	Goals	Club
1	GK	Hedvig Lindahl	29 April 1983 (aged 25)	34	0	(Swedish Football Association) Linköping
2	DF	Karolina Westberg	16 May 1978 (aged 30)	126	2	(Swedish Football Association) Umeå
3	DF	Stina Segerström	17 June 1983 (aged 25)	27	2	(Swedish Football Association) Örebro
4	DF	Anna Paulson	29 February 1984 (aged 24)	23	0	(Swedish Football Association) Umeå
5	MF	Caroline Seger	19 March 1985 (aged 23)	43	4	(Swedish Football Association) Linköping
6	DF	Sara Thunebro	26 April 1979 (aged 29)	32	2	(Swedish Football Association) Djurgårdens IF
7	DF	Sara Larsson	6 February 1987 (aged 21)	77	7	(Swedish Football Association) Linköping
8	FW	Lotta Schelin	27 February 1984 (aged 24)	52	19	(Swedish Football Association) Göteborg
9	FW	Jessica Landström	12 December 1984 (aged 23)	13	4	(Swedish Football Association) Linköping
10	FW	Johanna Almgren	22 March 1984 (aged 24)	15	0	(Swedish Football Association) Göteborg
11	FW	Victoria Sandell Svensson (captain)	18 May 1977 (aged 31)	149	64	(Swedish Football Association) Djurgårdens IF
12	GK	Caroline Jönsson	22 November 1977 (aged 30)	79	0	(Swedish Football Association) Malmö
13	DF	Frida Östberg	10 December 1977 (aged 30)	73	2	(Swedish Football Association) Umeå
14	MF	Josefine Öqvist	23 July 1983 (aged 25)	48	10	(Swedish Football Association) Linköping
15	MF	Therese Sjögran	8 April 1977 (aged 31)	127	11	(Swedish Football Association) Malmö
16	MF	Linda Forsberg	19 June 1985 (aged 23)	5	0	(Swedish Football Association) Djurgårdens IF
17	DF	Charlotte Rohlin	2 December 1980 (aged 27)	11	1	(Swedish Football Association) Linköping
18	MF	Nilla Fischer	2 August 1984 (aged 24)	35	4	(Swedish Football Association) Malmö
19	FW	Maria Aronsson	23 December 1983 (aged 24)	15	1	(Swedish Football Association) Malmö

Group play

Pos	Team	Pld	W	D	L	GF	GA	GD	Pts	Qualification
1	China	3	2	1	0	5	2	+3	7	Qualified for the quarterfinals
2	Sweden	3	2	0	1	4	3	+1	6	Qualified for the quarterfinals
3	Canada	3	1	1	1	4	4	0	4	Qualified for the quarterfinals
4	Argentina	3	0	0	3	1	5	−4	0	

6 August 2008
19:45

China	2–1	Sweden
Xu Yuan 6'; Han Duan 72'	Report	Schelin 38'

Tianjin Olympic Center Stadium, Tianjin
Attendance: 37,902
Referee: Hong Eun-ah (Korea Republic)
9 August 2008
17:00

Sweden	1–0	Argentina
Fischer 57'	Report

Tianjin Olympic Center Stadium, Tianjin
Attendance: 38,293
Referee: Dianne Ferreira-James (Guyana)
12 August 2008
19:45

Sweden	2–1	Canada
Schelin 19', 51'	Report	Tancredi 63'

Beijing Workers' Stadium, Beijing
Attendance: 51,112
Referee: Pannipar Kamnueng (Thailand)

Quarterfinal

15 August 2008
21:00

Sweden	0–2 (a.e.t.)	Germany
	Report	Garefrekes 104'; Laudehr 115'

Shenyang Olympic Stadium, Shenyang
Attendance: 17,209
Referee: Dagmar Damkova (Czech Republic)

== Handball ==
Summary

Key:

- ET: After extra time
- P – Match decided by penalty-shootout.

Team	Event	Group Stage						Quarterfinal	Semifinal / Cl.	Final / BM / Pl.	
Team	Event	Opposition Score	Opposition Score	Opposition Score	Opposition Score	Opposition Score	Rank	Opposition Score	Opposition Score	Opposition Score	Rank
Sweden women's	Women's tournament	Hungary; L 24–30	Russia; L 24–28	South Korea; W 31–23	Germany; W 27–26	Brazil; W 25–22	4 Q	Norway; L 24–31	5th-8th semifinal China; L 19–20	7th place final Romania; L 30–34	8

=== Women's tournament ===
Roster

The following is the Sweden roster in the women's handball tournament of the 2008 Summer Olympics.

Head coach: Ulf Schefvert

No.	Pos.	Name	Date of birth (age)	Height	App.	Goals	Club
3	P	Tina Flognman	29 June 1981 (aged 27)	1.78 m	127	266	(Denmark) GOG Svendborg
4	LW	Matilda Boson	4 December 1981 (aged 26)	1.76 m	115	271	(Denmark) Aalborg DH
5	P	Sara Holmgren	29 March 1979 (aged 29)	1.81 m	96	106	(Germany) HC Leipzig
6	CB	Therese Islas Helgesson	22 July 1983 (aged 25)	1.68 m	44	66	(Norway) Nordstrand IF
7	RW	Annika Wiel Fredén	21 August 1978 (aged 29)	1.76 m	52	135	(Denmark) Horsens HK
9	P	Frida Toveby	29 July 1982 (aged 26)	1.74 m	7	7	(Denmark) Aalborg DH
10	RW	Teresa Utković	31 July 1980 (aged 28)	1.70 m	55	128	(Sweden) IK Sävehof
11	CB	Jessica Enström	25 March 1977 (aged 31)	1.72 m	113	220	(Sweden) IVH Västerås
12	GK	Therese Bengtsson	13 February 1979 (aged 29)	1.87 m	21	0	(Sweden) Eslövs IK
14	RB	Sara Eriksson	13 April 1981 (aged 27)	1.82 m	96	152	(Germany) HC Leipzig
15	LB	Johanna Ahlm	3 October 1987 (aged 20)	1.75 m	22	64	(Sweden) IK Sävehof
16	GK	Madeleine Grundström	12 August 1980 (aged 27)	1.82 m	122	0	(Denmark) Aalborg DH
17	LB	Linnea Torstensson	30 March 1983 (aged 25)	1.86 m	38	145	(Denmark) Aalborg DH
18	P	Johanna Wiberg	6 September 1983 (aged 24)	1.85 m	63	52	(Denmark) FCK Håndbold
20	CB	Isabella Gulldén	29 June 1989 (aged 19)	1.79 m	5	3	(Sweden) IK Sävehof

Group play

Team	Pld	W	D	L	GF	GA	GD	Pts	Qualification
Russia	5	4	1	0	148	125	+23	9	Qualified for the quarterfinals
South Korea	5	3	1	1	155	127	+28	7	Qualified for the quarterfinals
Hungary	5	2	1	2	129	142	−13	5	Qualified for the quarterfinals
Sweden	5	2	0	3	123	137	−14	4	Qualified for the quarterfinals
Brazil	5	1	1	3	124	137	−13	3	
Germany	5	1	0	4	123	134	−11	2	

9 August 2008; 10:45	Hungary	30 – 24	Sweden	Olympic Sports Centre Gymnasium; Referees: Licis, Stolarovs (LAT)
9 August 2008; 10:45	Vérten, Görbicz 7	(15–14)	Islas Helgesson 6	Olympic Sports Centre Gymnasium; Referees: Licis, Stolarovs (LAT)
9 August 2008; 10:45	2× (yellow card) 7× (suspension)	Report	2× (yellow card) 4× (suspension)	Olympic Sports Centre Gymnasium; Referees: Licis, Stolarovs (LAT)

11 August 2008; 20:45	Sweden	24 – 28	Russia	Olympic Sports Centre Gymnasium; Referees: Din, Dinu (ROU)
11 August 2008; 20:45	Wiel Fredén 6	(12–14)	Turei 6	Olympic Sports Centre Gymnasium; Referees: Din, Dinu (ROU)
11 August 2008; 20:45	4× (yellow card) 4× (suspension)	Report	3× (yellow card) 4× (suspension)	Olympic Sports Centre Gymnasium; Referees: Din, Dinu (ROU)

13 August 2008; 14:00	South Korea	31 – 23	Sweden	Olympic Sports Centre Gymnasium; Referees: Baum, Goralczyk (POL)
13 August 2008; 14:00	An, Park 7	(18–13)	Ahlm, Boson 6	Olympic Sports Centre Gymnasium; Referees: Baum, Goralczyk (POL)
13 August 2008; 14:00	3× (yellow card) 1× (suspension) 1× (red card)	Report	4× (yellow card) 6× (suspension)	Olympic Sports Centre Gymnasium; Referees: Baum, Goralczyk (POL)

15 August 2008; 14:00	Germany	26 – 27	Sweden	Olympic Sports Centre Gymnasium; Referees: Bord, Buy (FRA)
15 August 2008; 14:00	Althaus, Wörz 5	(13–13)	Ahlm 7	Olympic Sports Centre Gymnasium; Referees: Bord, Buy (FRA)
15 August 2008; 14:00	2× (yellow card) 4× (suspension) 1× (red card)	Report	4× (yellow card) 4× (suspension)	Olympic Sports Centre Gymnasium; Referees: Bord, Buy (FRA)

17 August 2008; 09:00	Sweden	25 – 22	Brazil	Olympic Sports Centre Gymnasium; Referees: Bord, Buy (FRA)
17 August 2008; 09:00	Ahlm 7	(14–11)	Rosas 5	Olympic Sports Centre Gymnasium; Referees: Bord, Buy (FRA)
17 August 2008; 09:00	3× (yellow card) 3× (suspension)	Report	2× (yellow card) 4× (suspension)	Olympic Sports Centre Gymnasium; Referees: Bord, Buy (FRA)

Quarterfinal

19 August 2008; 12:00	Norway	31 – 24	Sweden	Olympic Sports Centre Gymnasium; Referees: Baum, Goralczyk (POL)
19 August 2008; 12:00	Larsen, Lybekk 6	(16–10)	Torstenson 6	Olympic Sports Centre Gymnasium; Referees: Baum, Goralczyk (POL)
19 August 2008; 12:00	3× (yellow card) 4× (suspension)	Report	4× (yellow card) 2× (suspension)	Olympic Sports Centre Gymnasium; Referees: Baum, Goralczyk (POL)

Classification semifinal

21 August 2008; 12:00	Sweden	19 – 20	China	Beijing National Indoor Stadium; Referees: Karbaschi, Kolahdouzan (IRI)
21 August 2008; 12:00	Torstenson 6	(7–8)	Wang Shasha 5	Beijing National Indoor Stadium; Referees: Karbaschi, Kolahdouzan (IRI)
21 August 2008; 12:00	4× (yellow card) 5× (suspension)	Report	3× (yellow card) 3× (suspension)	Beijing National Indoor Stadium; Referees: Karbaschi, Kolahdouzan (IRI)

7th–8th place

23 August 2008; 08:00	Sweden	30 – 34	Romania	Beijing National Indoor Stadium; Referees: Elmoamli, Shaban Ali (EGY)
23 August 2008; 08:00	Gulldén 9	(15–17)	Meirosu, Stanca-Gâlcă 6	Beijing National Indoor Stadium; Referees: Elmoamli, Shaban Ali (EGY)
23 August 2008; 08:00	4× (yellow card) 4× (suspension)	Report	3× (yellow card) 2× (suspension)	Beijing National Indoor Stadium; Referees: Elmoamli, Shaban Ali (EGY)

== Rowing ==
Men

Athlete	Event	Heats		Quarterfinals		Semifinals		Final	
Athlete	Event	Time	Rank	Time	Rank	Time	Rank	Time	Rank
Lassi Karonen	Single sculls	7:14.64	1 QF	6:50.40	2 SA/B	6:57.28	1 FA	7:07.64	6

Women

Athlete	Event	Heats		Quarterfinals		Semifinals		Final	
Athlete	Event	Time	Rank	Time	Rank	Time	Rank	Time	Rank
Frida Svensson	Single sculls	7:56.39	2 QF	7:29.29	2 SA/B	7:46.38	6 FB	7:48.19	7

Qualification Legend: FA=Final A (medal); FB=Final B (non-medal); FC=Final C (non-medal); FD=Final D (non-medal); FE=Final E (non-medal); FF=Final F (non-medal); SA/B=Semifinals A/B; SC/D=Semifinals C/D; SE/F=Semifinals E/F; QF=Quarterfinals; R=Repechage

== Sailing ==
Men

Athlete	Event	Race											Net points	Final rank
Athlete	Event	1	2	3	4	5	6	7	8	9	10	M*	Net points	Final rank
Rasmus Myrgren	Laser	7	16	8	2	8	13	~~2~~	7	2	CAN	20	83	6
Anton Dahlberg; Sebastian Östling	470	16	18	2	5	~~DSQ~~	20	17	13	14	6	EL	111	15
Anders Ekström; Fredrik Lööf	Star	1	4	~~15~~	3	6	1	8	2	1	7	20	53	3rd place, bronze medalist(s)

Women

Athlete	Event	Race											Net points	Final rank
Athlete	Event	1	2	3	4	5	6	7	8	9	10	M*	Net points	Final rank
Karin Söderström	Laser Radial	19	19	4	25	9	18	~~DSQ~~	5	8	CAN	EL	107	14
Vendela Santén; Therese Torgersson	470	10	14	18	~~DSQ~~	19	8	5	14	5	8	EL	101	15

Open

Athlete	Event	Race																Net points	Final rank
Athlete	Event	1	2	3	4	5	6	7	8	9	10	11	12	13	14	15	M*	Net points	Final rank
Daniel Birgmark	Finn	14	~~17~~	1	6	12	3	3	5	CAN	CAN	—N/a					14	58	4
Jonas Lindberg; Kalle Torlen	49er	16	18	2	17	12	16	17	14	19	16	16	~~DSQ~~	CAN	CAN	CAN	EL	163	18

M = Medal race; EL = Eliminated – did not advance into the medal race; CAN = Race cancelled

== Shooting ==
Men

Athlete	Event	Qualification		Final	
Athlete	Event	Points	Rank	Points	Rank
Håkan Dahlby	Double trap	135	10	Did not advance	

Women

Athlete	Event	Qualification		Final	
Athlete	Event	Points	Rank	Points	Rank
Nathalie Larsson	Skeet	69	6 Q	92 S/O 2	4

== Swimming ==
Men

Athlete	Event	Heat		Semifinal		Final	
Athlete	Event	Time	Rank	Time	Rank	Time	Rank
Jonas Andersson	100 m breaststroke	1:01.77	31	Did not advance			
Lars Frölander	100 m butterfly	52.15	18	Did not advance			
Stefan Nystrand	50 m freestyle	21.75 NR	4 Q	21.71 NR	4 Q	21.72	8
Stefan Nystrand	100 m freestyle	47.83 NR	2 Q	47.91	5 Q	48.33	8
Jonas Persson	100 m freestyle	48.51	15 Q	48.59	13	Did not advance	
Simon Sjödin	200 m backstroke	DNS		Did not advance			
Simon Sjödin	200 m butterfly	1:57.75 NR	26	Did not advance			
Christoffer Wikström	200 m freestyle	1:49.84	38	Did not advance			
Stefan Nystrand; Jonas Persson; Marcus Piehl; Petter Stymne; Christoffer Wikström	4 × 100 m freestyle relay	3:12.73 NR	5 Q	—N/a		3:11.92 NR	5
Jonas Andersson; Lars Frölander; Stefan Nystrand; Simon Sjödin	4 × 100 m medley relay	3:35.83 NR	11	—N/a		Did not advance	

Women

Athlete	Event	Heat		Semifinal		Final	
Athlete	Event	Time	Rank	Time	Rank	Time	Rank
Therese Alshammar	50 m freestyle	24.94	9 Q	24.96	14	Did not advance	
Eva Berglund	10 km open water	—N/a				2:01:05.0	18
Gabriella Fagundez	400 m freestyle	4:11.40	18	—N/a		Did not advance	
Gabriella Fagundez	800 m freestyle	8:39.06 NR	24	—N/a		Did not advance	
Petra Granlund	200 m butterfly	2:08.97 NR	14 Q	2:09.79	14	Did not advance	
Joline Höstman	100 m breaststroke	1:07.91	8 Q	1:08.26	9	Did not advance	
Joline Höstman	200 m breaststroke	2:26.00	12 Q	2:27.14	12	Did not advance	
Anna-Karin Kammerling	50 m freestyle	25.34	22	Did not advance			
Josefin Lillhage	100 m freestyle	54.07 NR	10 Q	54.59	11	Did not advance	
Josefin Lillhage	200 m freestyle	1:57.98	13 Q	1:59.29	15	Did not advance	
Ida Marko-Varga	200 m freestyle	1:58.21	16 Q	1:59.41	16	Did not advance	
Sarah Sjöström	100 m backstroke	1:02.38 NR	29	Did not advance			
Sarah Sjöström	100 m butterfly	59.08	27	Did not advance			
Hanna Westrin	100 m breaststroke	1:08.80	21	Did not advance			
Therese Alshammar; Claire Hedenskog; Anna-Karin Kammerling; Josefin Lillhage; Ida Marko-Varga	4 × 100 m freestyle relay	3:40.52	11	—N/a		Did not advance	
Gabriella Fagundez; Petra Granlund; Josefin Lillhage; Ida Marko-Varga	4 × 200 m freestyle relay	7:53.83 NR	5 Q	—N/a		7:59.83	8
Joline Höstman; Ida Marko-Varga; Sarah Sjöström; Hanna Westrin	4 × 100 m medley relay	4:02.12 NR	7 Q	—N/a		DSQ	

== Table tennis ==
Singles

Athlete	Event	Preliminary round	Round 1	Round 2	Round 3	Round 4	Quarterfinals	Semifinals	Final / BM	
Athlete	Event	Opposition Result	Opposition Result	Opposition Result	Opposition Result	Opposition Result	Opposition Result	Opposition Result	Opposition Result	Rank
Jens Lundqvist	Men's singles	Bye	Henzell (AUS); L 2–4	Did not advance						
Jörgen Persson	Men's singles	Bye		Karakašević (SRB); W 4–2	Cheung (HKG); W 4–1	Samsonov (BLR); W 4–3	Primorac (CRO); W 4–1	Wang H (CHN); L 1–4	Wang Lq (CHN); L 0–4	4

Team

Athlete	Event	Group round		Semifinals	Bronze playoff 1	Bronze playoff 2	Bronze medal	Final	
Athlete	Event	Opposition Result	Rank	Opposition Result	Opposition Result	Opposition Result	Opposition Result	Opposition Result	Rank
Pär Gerell; Jens Lundqvist; Jörgen Persson	Men's team	Group C South Korea; L 0 – 3 Chinese Taipei; L 2 – 3 Brazil; W 3 – 0	3	Did not advance					

Robert Svensson was the reserve for the men's team.

== Taekwondo ==
Athlete	Event	Round of 16	Quarterfinals	Semifinals	Repechage	Bronze Medal	Final	
Athlete	Event	Opposition Result	Opposition Result	Opposition Result	Opposition Result	Opposition Result	Opposition Result	Rank
Hanna Zajc	Women's −49 kg	Gonda (CAN); W 2–0	Wu Jy (CHN); L 1–8	Did not advance	Alango (KEN); L 2–2 SUP	Did not advance		
Karolina Kedzierska	Women's +67 kg	Simon (ESP); W 4–1	Espinoza (MEX); L 2–4	Did not advance	Ben Hamza (TUN); W 5–4	Falavigna (BRA); L 2–5	Did not advance	5

== Tennis ==
Athlete	Event	Round of 64	Round of 32	Round of 16	Quarterfinals	Semifinals	Final / BM	
Athlete	Event	Opposition Score	Opposition Score	Opposition Score	Opposition Score	Opposition Score	Opposition Score	Rank
Jonas Björkman	Men's singles	Hewitt (AUS); L 5–7, 6–7^{(2–7)}	Did not advance					
Thomas Johansson	Men's singles	Nieminen (FIN); W 4–6, 6–4, 6–4	Youzhny (RUS); L 5–7, 2–6	Did not advance				
Robin Söderling	Men's singles	Simon (FRA); L 4–6, 4–6	Did not advance					
Simon Aspelin; Thomas Johansson	Men's doubles	—N/a	Hanley / Kerr (AUS); W 7–6^{(9–7)}, 6–3	Almagro / Ferrer (ESP); W 7–6^{(8–6)}, 6–4	Fyrstenberg / Matkowski (POL); W 7–6^{(7–5)}, 6–4	Clément / Llodra (FRA); W 7–6^{(8–6)}, 4–6, 19–17	Federer / Wawrinka (SUI); L 3–6, 4–6, 7–6^{(7–4)}, 3–6	2nd place, silver medalist(s)
Jonas Björkman; Robin Söderling	Men's doubles	—N/a	Nadal / Robredo (ESP); L 3–6, 3–6	Did not advance				
Sofia Arvidsson	Women's singles	Tanasugarn (THA); W 6–2, 6–1	Dementieva (RUS); L 3–6, 4–6	Did not advance				

== Triathlon ==
Athlete	Event	Swim (1.5 km)	Trans 1	Bike (40 km)	Trans 2	Run (10 km)	Total Time	Rank
Lisa Nordén	Women's	20:56	0:29	1:05:26	0:31	35:05	2:02:27.47	18

== Wrestling ==
Key:

- VT - Victory by Fall.
- PP - Decision by Points - the loser with technical points.
- PO - Decision by Points - the loser without technical points.

Men's Greco-Roman

Athlete	Event	Qualification	Round of 16	Quarterfinal	Semifinal	Repechage 1	Repechage 2	Final / BM	
Athlete	Event	Opposition Result	Opposition Result	Opposition Result	Opposition Result	Opposition Result	Opposition Result	Opposition Result	Rank
Ara Abrahamian	−84 kg	Kim J-S (KOR); W 3–1 ^{PP}	Estrada (CUB); W 3–1 ^{PP}	Forov (ARM); W 3–1 ^{PP}	Minguzzi (ITA); L 1–3 ^{PP}	Bye		Noumonvi (FRA); W 3–1 ^{PP}	3*
Jalmar Sjöberg	−120 kg	Mikulski (POL); W 3–1 ^{PP}	Botev (AZE); W 3–0 ^{PO}	Byers (USA); W 3–1 ^{PP}	López (CUB); L 0–3 ^{PO}	Bye		Patrikeyev (ARM); L 1–3 ^{PP}	5

* Ara Abrahamian won the bronze medal, but later disqualified and stripped off his medal after a protest during the medal ceremony. He stepped off the podium and put the medal on the floor and walked off, before the gold and silver medals had been awarded. His action was in protest at a controversial penalty call in his semifinal against Italy's Andrea Minguzzi. The medal, however, was not awarded to another athlete. The International Olympic Committee (IOC) said the Swede was punished for violating the spirit of fair play during the medal ceremony.

Women's freestyle

Athlete	Event	Qualification	Round of 16	Quarterfinal	Semifinal	Repechage 1	Repechage 2	Final / BM	
Athlete	Event	Opposition Result	Opposition Result	Opposition Result	Opposition Result	Opposition Result	Opposition Result	Opposition Result	Rank
Sofia Mattsson	−48 kg	Bye	Chun (USA); L 1–3 ^{PP}	Did not advance					12
Ida-Theres Nerell	−55 kg	—N/a	Yoshida (JPN); L 1–3 ^{PP}	Did not advance		Bye	Golts (RUS); W 3–1 ^{PP}	Verbeek (CAN); L 0–3 ^{PO}	5
Jenny Fransson	−72 kg	—N/a	Wang J (CHN); L 1–3 ^{PP}	Did not advance		Bye	Bernard (USA); L 1–3 ^{PP}	Did not advance	9

== Missing athletes ==
The following athletes did not qualify for the Olympics despite having won a nomination or being among the top of the world in their sport. This could either be due to injuries, failing to achieve the national and/or international standards or due to heavy competition from fellow Swedish athletes.

=== Athletics ===
- Robert Kronberg - men's 110 metres hurdles (A - norm, 13.53 July 16, 2008 Luzern)
- Christian Olsson - injury, men's triple jump (A - norm, 17.00 July 22, 2008 Stockholm)
- Nicklas Wiberg - men's decathlon (A - norm, 8040 June 29, 2008 Jyvaskyla)
- Jessica Samuelsson - women's heptathlon (A - norm, 6111 June 1, 2008 Götzis)

== See also ==
- Sweden at the 2008 Summer Paralympics
