= Equestrian events at the 2008 Summer Olympics – Qualification =

== Summary ==
Nation	Individual			Team			Total
Nation	Dressage	Eventing	Jumping	Dressage	Eventing	Jumping	Total
Argentina			1				1
Australia	3	5	4	X	X	X	12
Austria	1	1					2
Azerbaijan			1				1
Belarus	1	2					3
Belgium		2	1				3
Bermuda			1				1
Brazil	2	4	4		X	X	10
Canada	3	5	4	X	X	X	12
Chile		1					1
China	1	1	4			X	6
Colombia			1				1
Czech Republic		1					1
Denmark	3	1		X			4
Egypt			1				1
Finland	1						1
France	3	4		X	X		7
Germany	3	5	4	X	X	X	12
Great Britain	3	5	4	X	X	X	12
Guatemala			1				1
Hong Kong			3			X	3
Ireland		5	1		X		6
Italy	1	5			X		6
Jamaica		1					1
Japan	3	1	2	X			6
Jordan			1				1
Mexico	1		4			X	5
Netherlands	3	1	4	X		X	8
New Zealand		5	4		X	X	9
Norway			4			X	4
Poland	1	2					3
Portugal	3			X			3
Russia	2	2	1				5
Saudi Arabia			4			X	4
South Korea	1						1
Spain	2						2
Sweden	3	5	4	X	X	X	12
Switzerland		1	4			X	5
Ukraine			4			X	4
United Arab Emirates			1				1
United States	3	5	4	X	X	X	12
Venezuela			1				1
Total: 42 NOCs	47	70	77	11	11	16	194

== Dressage ==
An NOC may enter up to 3 athletes if they qualified for the team competition

=== Team ===
Event	Date	Venue	Vacancies	Qualified
World Equestrian Games	Aug 20 - Sep 3, 2006	(Germany) Aachen	3	Germany; Netherlands; United States
European Championship	Aug 27 - Sep 2, 2007	(Italy) Turin	3	Sweden; ~~Switzerland~~*; Great Britain
Asia Pacific Championship Group F/G	Jan 31, 2008; Feb 4, 2008; Feb 7, 2008	(France) Cannes (Australia) Sydney (New Zealand) Palmerston North	2	Australia; Japan
Pan-American Games Group D/E	July 13–29, 2007	(Brazil) Rio de Janeiro	2	Canada; ~~Brazil~~ ***
Composite team from Olympic rankings**	-	-	+	Denmark; France; Portugal
TOTAL			11	

* Switzerland decided not to send a Team or an Individual to the Olympic Dressage competition after Silvia Iklé, the top rider on the Swiss team, refused to bring her horse, Salieri CH, to Hong-Kong due to the long travel and concerns over climatic conditions.

** 3 individuals qualified from the same nation from the Olympic rankings to make up a team

*** Brazil sent only two riders

=== Individual ===
Individual qualification decided by the FEI Olympic Riders Ranking as of May 1, 2008.

Event	Vacancies	Qualified
Host Nation	1	China
Team Event	29**	All athletes
North Western Europe	1	Finland
South Western Europe	1	France
Central & Eastern Europe; Central Asia	1	Russia
North America	1	~~Antigua and Barbuda~~***
Central & South America	1	Mexico
Africa & Middle East	1	~~South Africa~~***
South East Asia; Oceania	1	South Korea
Other places*	12+	Denmark; Austria; Spain; Denmark; Denmark; Spain; Belarus; ~~Spain~~; Italy; France; France; Russia; Poland**; Portugal**; ~~Russia~~**; Portugal***; Portugal***
TOTAL	47	

* Other places to complete the quota will be allocated to best ranked individuals not qualified above and invitation places.

** Switzerland decided not to send a Team and replaced by NOCs of the next highest ranked eligible athletes on the FEI Olympic Riders Ranking.

*** Unused quotas replaced by NOC of the next highest ranked eligible athletes on the FEI Olympic Riders Ranking.

== Eventing ==
An NOC may enter up to 5 athletes if they qualified for the team competition, or up to 2 athletes if they didn't.

=== Team ===
Team Competition	Date	Venue	Vacancies	Qualified
World Equestrian Games	Aug 20 - Sep 3, 2006	(Germany) Aachen	5	Germany; Great Britain; Australia; United States; Sweden
Pan-American Games Group D/E	July 13–29, 2007	(Brazil) Rio de Janeiro	2	Canada; Brazil
Asia Pacific Championship Group F/G*	Oct 27-28, 2007	(New Zealand) Takapau	~~1~~	-
European Championship	Sep 13-16 2007	(Italy) Pratoni del Vivaro	2	France; Italy
Composite team from Olympic rankings**	-	-	+	New Zealand; Ireland
TOTAL			11	

* Event not held

** made up of minimum 3 to a maximum of 5 individuals qualified from the same nation from the Olympic rankings to make up a team

=== Individual ===
Individual qualification will be decided by the FEI Olympic Riders Ranking as of May 1, 2008.

Event	Vacancies	Qualified
Host Nation	1	China
Team Event	43	All athletes
North Western Europe	1	Denmark
South Western Europe	1	Belgium
Central & Eastern Europe; Central Asia	1	Poland
North America	1	Jamaica
Central & South America	1	Chile
Africa & Middle East	1	~~South Africa~~**
South East Asia; Oceania	1	New Zealand
Other places*	22+	New Zealand; New Zealand; New Zealand; New Zealand; Austria; Belgium; Switzerland; Belarus; Japan; Ireland; Russia; Poland; Belarus; Ireland; Russia; Ireland; ~~Argentina~~; Netherlands; ~~Netherlands~~; Ireland; Ireland; ~~Chile~~; Czech Republic**
TOTAL	70	

* Other places to complete the quota will be allocated to best ranked individuals not qualified above and invitation places.

** Unused quota replaced by NOC of the next highest ranked eligible athletes on the FEI Olympic Riders Ranking.

== Jumping ==
An NOC may enter up to 4 athletes if they qualified for the team competition, or up to 2 athletes if they didn't.

=== Team ===
Event	Date	Venue	Vacancies	Qualified
Host Nation	-	-	2	China; Hong Kong
2006 FEI World Equestrian Games	Aug 20 - Sep 3, 2006	(Germany) Aachen	5	Netherlands; United States; Germany; Ukraine; Switzerland
2007 FEI European Jumping Championship	August 15–19, 2007	(Germany) Mannheim	3	Great Britain; Sweden; Norway
2007 Pan American Games	July 13–29, 2007	(Brazil) Rio de Janeiro	3	Brazil; Canada; Mexico
2006 FEI World Equestrian Games / Qualification Event 2007 (combined) Group F	Aug 20 - Sep 3, 2006; March 6–10, 2007	(Germany) Aachen (Qatar) Doha	1	Saudi Arabia
2006 FEI World Equestrian Games Group G	Aug 20 - Sep 3, 2006	(Germany) Aachen	1	Australia
Olympic Qualification Event Group G	June 7–10, 2007	(Germany) Balve	1	New Zealand
TOTAL			16	

=== Individual ===
Team Competition	Date	Venue	Vacancies	Qualified
Team Event	-	-	63	All athletes
Olympic Riders Ranking Group A/B	May 1, 2008	-	2	Ireland; Belgium
Olympic Riders Ranking Group C	May 1, 2008	-	3	Russia; ~~Russia~~; Azerbaijan
Pan-American Games Group D	July 13–29, 2007	(Brazil) Rio de Janeiro	1	Bermuda
Pan-American Games Group E	July 13–29, 2007	(Brazil) Rio de Janeiro	4	Venezuela; Colombia; Argentina; Guatemala
World Equestrian Games Group F	Aug 20 - Sep 3, 2006	(Germany) Aachen	2	Jordan; Egypt
Qualification Event 2007 Group F	March 6–10, 2007	(Qatar) Doha	1	United Arab Emirates
World Equestrian Games Group G	Aug 20 - Sep 3, 2006	(Germany) Aachen	1	Japan
Qualification Event 2007 Group G	June 7–10, 2007	(Germany) Balve	1	Japan
TOTAL			77	
