= Petrikov =

Petrikov or Petříkov may refer to:

== Places ==
=== Czech Republic ===
- Petříkov (České Budějovice District), a municipality and village in the South Bohemian Region
- Petříkov (Prague-East District), a municipality and village in the Central Bohemian Region
- Petříkov (Ostružná), a village and part of Ostružná in the Olomouc Region

=== Belarus ===
- Pyetrykaw, also known as Petrikov, a town

== People ==
- Pavel Petřikov (Czech judoka born 1959)
- Pavel Petřikov (Czech judoka born 1986)

=== Fictional characters ===
- Alexi Petrikov, from Woman of the Year (musical)
- Simon Petrikov, the Ice King, from Adventure Time
