= Jaroslav Hatla =

Czech equestrian (born 1973)

Personal information
- Nationality: Czech
- Born: 5 May 1973 (age 51); Hořice, Czechoslovakia

Sport
- Sport: Equestrian

Jaroslav Hatla (born 5 May 1973) is a Czech former equestrian and coach. He competed in eventing at the 2004 Summer Olympics and the 2008 Summer Olympics.

== Life ==
Jaroslav Hatla was born on 5 May 1973 in Hořice. He is married and has the son Adrián.

== Career ==
He started riding in the riding club in Humburky. He received his riding license at the age of ten. Since the age of fifteen, he has been involved in the most demanding riding discipline – eventing. In 1992 and 1993 he won the young riders' championship of Czechoslovakia and the Czech Republic, respectively. He then moved to the riding club Horse Academy Radimovice in Petříkov-Radimovice, where he was also employed as a trainer of horses.

In 1999, he became the national champion in show jumping. In the following years, he became the national champion in eventing several times.

Hatla was the fourth Czech/Czechoslovak equestrian who competed at the Olympic Games and the first one in the history of the independent Czech Republic. In eventing, Hatla competed at the 2004 Summer Olympics, where he finished 22nd, and at the 2008 Summer Olympics, where he did not finish, after his horse got injured. He also prepared for the 2012 Summer Olympics in London, which is why he moved to the United Kingdom for a long time, but he failed to qualify.

As late as 2022, at the age of 49, he participated in the Czech Republic Championship. After his riding career, Hatla became a coach and would like one of his charges to repeat his participation in the Olympic Games.
