= Tiziana Realini =

Swiss equestrian

Personal information
- Nationality: Swiss
- Born: 3 March 1984 (age 41); Locarno, Switzerland

Sport
- Sport: Equestrian

Tiziana Realini (born 3 March 1984) is a Swiss equestrian. She competed in the individual eventing at the 2008 Summer Olympics.
