= Paweł Spisak =

Polish equestrian

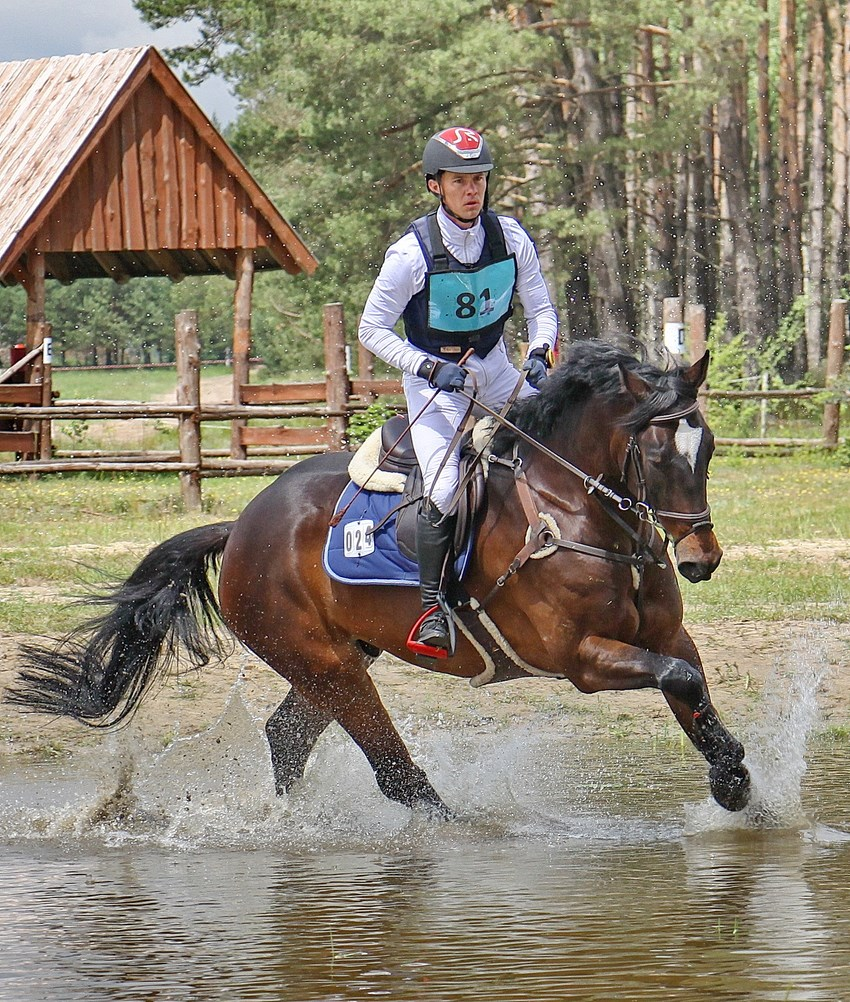
Pawel Spisak (2017)

Paweł Tadeusz Spisak (born 29 September 1981 in Koszalin) is a Polish equestrian. At the 2004, 2008, 2012 and 2016 Summer Olympics he competed in the Individual eventing.
