= Theodore O'Connor =

Eventing pony (1995–2008)

- Karen O'Connor and Theodore O'Connor at the 2008 Rolex Kentucky Three Day Event
- Breed: Shetland pony x Arabian x Thoroughbred
- Sire: Witty Boy (Thoroughbred)
- Grandsire: Anticipating (Thoroughbred)
- Dam: Chelsea's Melody (Shetland Pony x Arabian x Thoroughbred)
- Maternal grandsire: Honest Turn (Thoroughbred)
- Sex: Gelding
- Foaled: 1995
- Country: United States
- Colour: Chestnut with a star
- Breeder: P. Wynn Norman
- Owner: The Theodore O'Connor Syndicate
- Trainer: Nicole Villers (2002–2003), Christan Trainor (2004–2005), Karen O'Connor (2005–2008)

Medal record

Equestrian

Pan American Games
| Gold medal – first place | 2007 Rio de Janeiro | Team eventing |
| Gold medal – first place | 2007 Rio de Janeiro | Individual eventing |

Theodore O'Connor (May 8, 1995 – May 28, 2008), nicknamed "Teddy," was a 14.1^{3}/_{4} hands (57.75 inches, 147 cm) pony (though of horse phenotype) who competed internationally at the highest level of eventing. Ridden by Olympian Karen O'Connor, he performed exceedingly well at such events as the Rolex Kentucky Three Day and the Pan American Games. His success and small stature earned him the nickname "Super Pony."

== Breeding ==
Theodore O'Connor (or "Teddy") was by the 16.2 hands (66 inches, 168 cm) Thoroughbred stallion Witty Boy, who finished his racing career with a record of (40-5-1-3) and earnings of $50,518. Witty Boy went on to sire more than 300 horses in the United States, including winners in-hand, hunters, eventers, endurance horses, jumpers and dressage horses. Notable progeny include the show hunter I Don't Know (2000 USAEq National Champion) and the Anglo-Arabian VSF Otis+/ (completing 100-mile endurance competition).

Theodore O'Connor was out of Chelsea's Melody, a 13 hands (52 inches, 132 cm) mare of 1/2 Thoroughbred, 1/4 Arabian, and 1/4 Shetland Pony breeding. The sire of Chelsea's Melody was a racing Thoroughbred by the name of Honest Turn, a great-grandson of Bold Ruler. Her dam, Esker Electra, was by the stallion JR Lyraff, who was strongly linebred to the extremely influential Arabian stallion Raffles, son of Skowronek.

=== Pedigree ===
Pedigree of Theodore O'Connor
| Sire Witty Boy br. 1980 Thoroughbred | Anticipating b. 1971 | Bold Ruler br. 16.0 1954 | Nasrullah |
| Sire Witty Boy br. 1980 Thoroughbred | Anticipating b. 1971 | Bold Ruler br. 16.0 1954 | Miss Disco |
| Sire Witty Boy br. 1980 Thoroughbred | Anticipating b. 1971 | Marking Time ch. 1963 | To Market |
| Sire Witty Boy br. 1980 Thoroughbred | Anticipating b. 1971 | Marking Time ch. 1963 | Allemande |
| Sire Witty Boy br. 1980 Thoroughbred | Very Witty br. 1968 | Better Bee dkb 1954 | Triplicate |
| Sire Witty Boy br. 1980 Thoroughbred | Very Witty br. 1968 | Better Bee dkb 1954 | S. Bee |
| Sire Witty Boy br. 1980 Thoroughbred | Very Witty br. 1968 | Miss Witty b. 1955 | Lord Putnam |
| Sire Witty Boy br. 1980 Thoroughbred | Very Witty br. 1968 | Miss Witty b. 1955 | Quick Retort |
| Dam Chelsea's Melody b. 1992 | Honest Turn; 15.3 hh 1981; Thoroughbred | Honest Pleasure dkb/br 1973 | What A Pleasure |
| Dam Chelsea's Melody b. 1992 | Honest Turn; 15.3 hh 1981; Thoroughbred | Honest Pleasure dkb/br 1973 | Tularia |
| Dam Chelsea's Melody b. 1992 | Honest Turn; 15.3 hh 1981; Thoroughbred | Timeforaturn b 1975 | Best Turn |
| Dam Chelsea's Melody b. 1992 | Honest Turn; 15.3 hh 1981; Thoroughbred | Timeforaturn b 1975 | Pidi |
| Dam Chelsea's Melody b. 1992 | Esker Electra; Shetland/Arabian; 11.3 hh ch. 1980 | JR Lyraff b 1975 Arabian | Winraff |
| Dam Chelsea's Melody b. 1992 | Esker Electra; Shetland/Arabian; 11.3 hh ch. 1980 | JR Lyraff b 1975 Arabian | Asil Lyra |
| Dam Chelsea's Melody b. 1992 | Esker Electra; Shetland/Arabian; 11.3 hh ch. 1980 | Esker Eclipse; Shetland Pony | Happy Hour Supreme |
| Dam Chelsea's Melody b. 1992 | Esker Electra; Shetland/Arabian; 11.3 hh ch. 1980 | Esker Eclipse; Shetland Pony | Arbor Acres Eileen |

== Competitive career ==
Theodore O'Connor was started at the age of three years by his breeder and began his competitive career as a show hunter, later showing a bit as a jumper. He began eventing when he was six and continued up through Preliminary under rider Nicole Villers, before Christan Trainor rode him on through the Advanced level and finished in 8th place at his first CIC***. Olympian Karen O'Connor then rode him at the Advanced level, eventually taking him to his first CCI**** at the Rolex Kentucky Three Day where he finished 3rd with 4.4 time faults cross-country. He then qualified for the Pan American Games as part of the US Eventing Team, where he won the team gold and beat out several more experienced horses to also win the individual gold. He finished 6th at the 2008 Rolex CCI**** and was short-listed for the Olympic Team.

== Achievements ==
2008

- 6th Rolex Kentucky Three Day

2007

- Individual and team gold medal at the Pan American Games
- 3rd individually at the Rolex Kentucky Three Day
- 1st The Fork CIC***

2006

- 7th at the Poplar Place CIC***
- 9th at the Jersey Fresh CIC***
- 7th at the Fork CIC***

== Death ==
Theodore O’Connor was humanely euthanized on May 28, 2008 as a result of an injury sustained at Karen and David O’Connor’s barn in The Plains, VA. The attending veterinarian stated:

"He spooked at something while being ridden and bolted. The rider came off and the horse ran toward the barn. He got into a freak accident and slid into the side of the barn and lacerated his right hind leg about 4 inches above the fetlock on the back of the leg. It looked like a knife cut it; he severed the superficial and deep digital flexor tendons, ligaments, cut both branches of the arterial blood supply, and nerves. My experience with injuries like this are that the chances of reattaching the vascular supply and nerve supply and reattaching the tendons and ligaments is almost zero. Even if there has been a 10% chance of us being successful to recover him (from surgery) … but with the nature of the injury, that wasn't going to happen," said Allen sadly. "Karen would have done anything for that pony."
