= Sergio Iturriaga =

Chilean equestrian (born 1974)

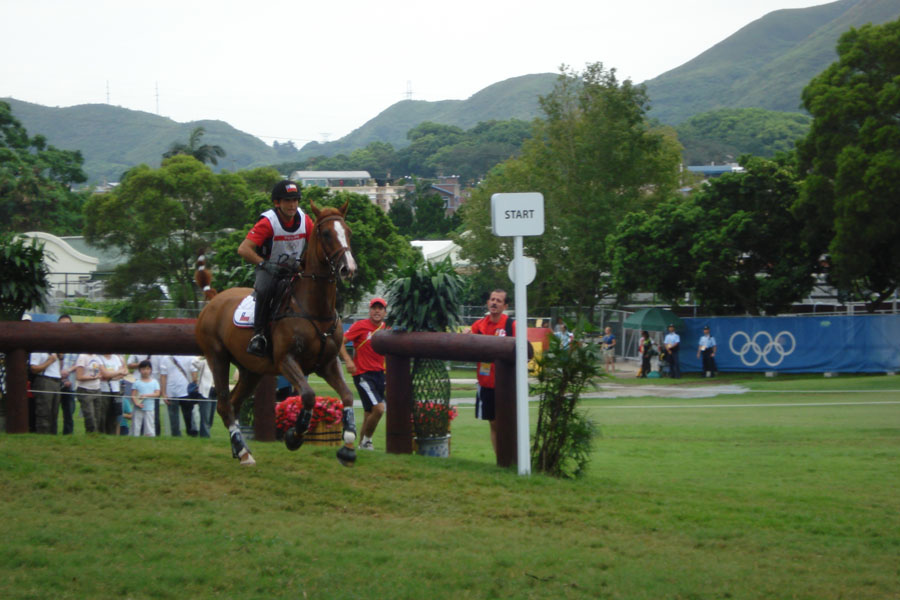
- Sergio Iturriaga riding Lago Rupanco (2008)

Personal information
- Born: 3 August 1974 (age 51) Concepción, Chile

Sport
- Sport: Equestrian
Medal record
Equestrian
Representing Chile
South American Championships
Silver medal – second place	2014 Barretos	Team eventing
Silver medal – second place	2018 Campo de Mayo	Individual eventing
Silver medal – second place	2018 Campo de Mayo	Team eventing

Sergio Iturriaga (born 3 August 1974) is a Chilean equestrian. He competed in the individual eventing at the 2008 Summer Olympics.
