= Valery Martyshev =

Russian equestrian

Personal information
- Nationality: Russian
- Born: 14 March 1964 (age 61) Moscow, Russia

Sport
- Sport: Equestrian

Valery Martyshev (born 14 March 1964, Novopodrezkovo settlement) is a Russian equestrian athlete, Master of Sports of International Classrian (MSMK). He competed in the individual eventing at the 2008 Summer Olympics.
