= Equestrian events at the 2007 Pan American Games =

- Venues: Deodoro Military Club

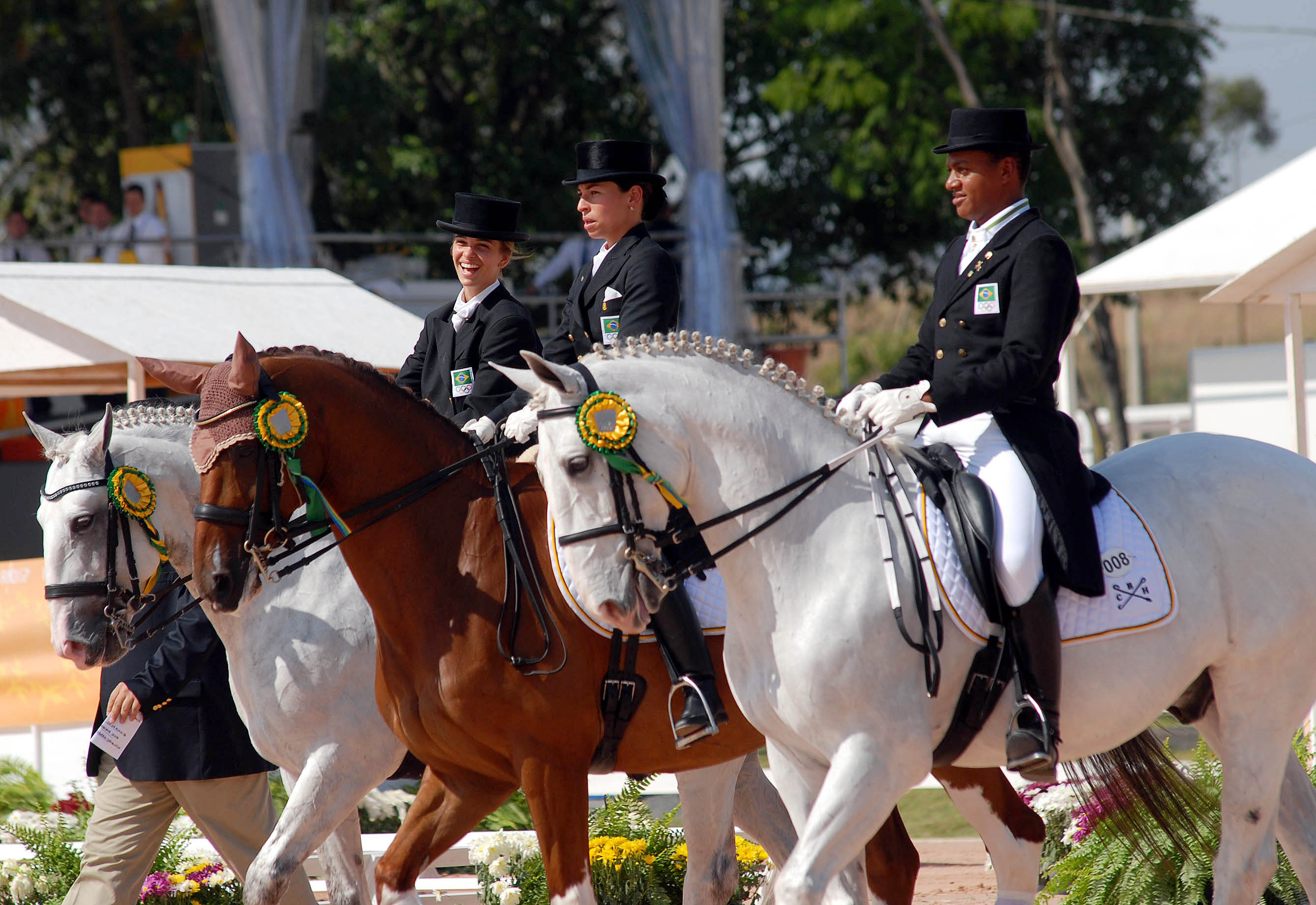
Members of the 2007 Pan American Brazilian Dressage Team

The Equestrian events included three disciplines: dressage, eventing, and show jumping, and were held at the Deodoro Military Club.

The competition is broken down into an individual and team competition for each discipline, for a total of 42 medals awarded. There are three members per team and one reserve rider in the dressage, and up to 4 team members in the eventing competition with only the top 3 member's scores taken for the final results.

== Dressage results ==
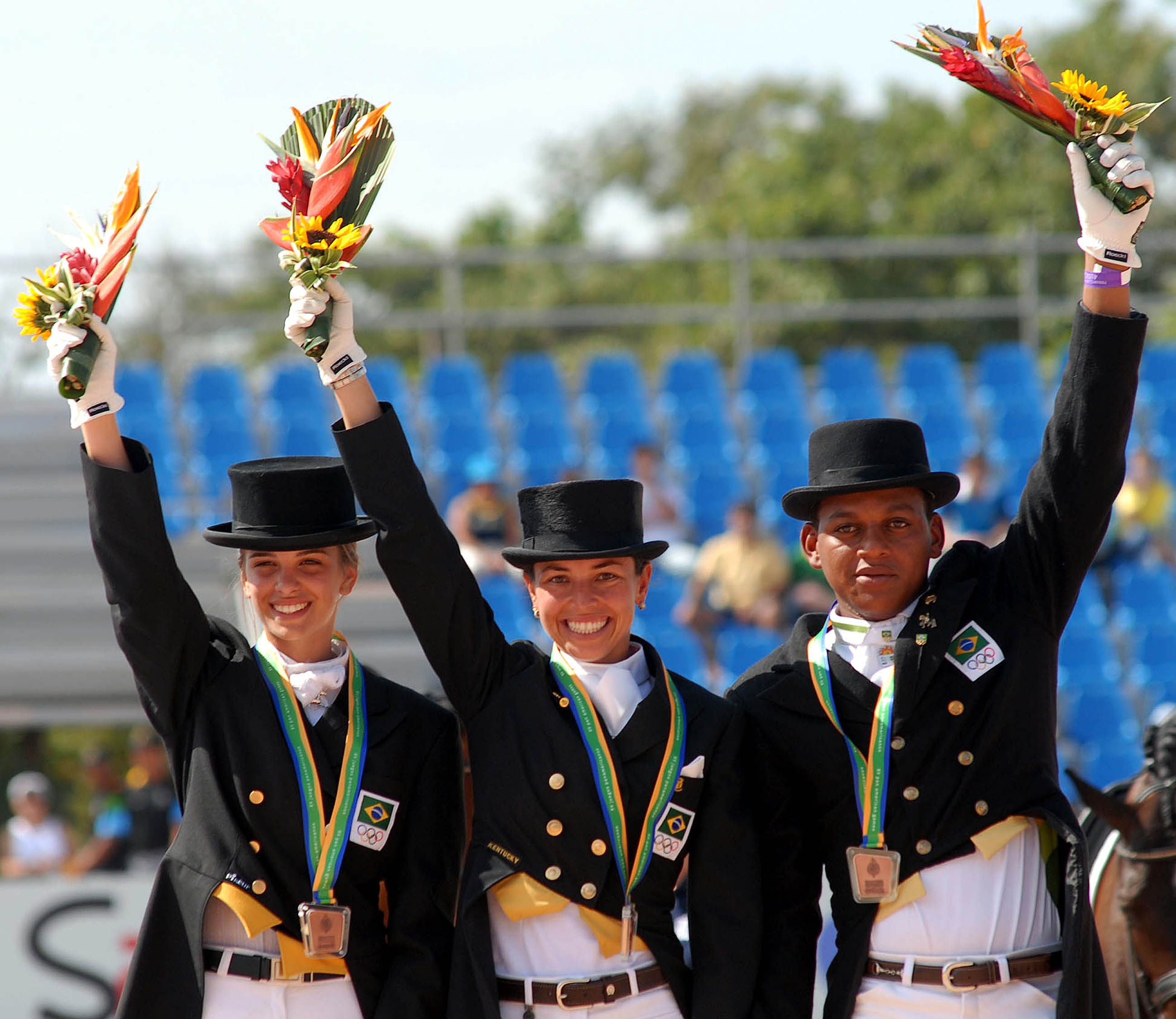
The bronze-winning Brazilian dressage team

The dressage team riders complete a test at Prix St. George level, and the individual riders complete a PSG and Intermediate I level test, with the top 15 competitors moving on to ride for medals in an Intermediate I Freestyle test.

=== Ground Jury ===
Appointment of Dressage judges was as follows:

- (Belgium) Mariette Withages (Ground Jury President)
- (United States) Jane Weatherwax (Ground Jury Member)
- (Brazil) Salim Nigri (Ground Jury Member)
- (Peru) Marian Cunningham (Ground Jury Member)
- (United Kingdom) Stephen Clarke (Ground Jury Member)

=== Team dressage ===
The team results qualified Canada and Brazil to compete at the 2008 Olympic Games in dressage.

Medal	Athlete	Score
Gold	United States Lauren Sammis / Sagacious HF; Katherine Poulin-Neff / Brilliant Too; Christopher Hickey / Regent	68.633%
Silver	Canada Tom Dvorak / Beaumarchais; Diane Creech / Wiona; Andrea Bresee / Raffles	67.250%
Bronze	Brazil Rogério Clementino / Nilo Vo; Renata Costa / Monty; Luiza Almeida / Samba	64.933%
4th place	Mexico Cristobal Egerstrom / Ferro; Jose Luis Padilla / Lohengrin; Patrick Burssens / Dark Secret	63.533%
5th place	Argentina Sandra Mith / Oceano Do Top; Gabriel Armando / Euclid; Vera Protzen / Kadirmo	61.233%
6th place	Guatemala Silvia Regina Roesch / Perla; Sylvia Luna / Westerberg; Christa Dauber / Serafino	60.367%
7th place	Chile Roberto Gomez / Tiziano; Oscar Coddou / Bridge; Mario Vargas / Tejas Verdes Montse	60.000%

=== Individual dressage ===
Medal	Athlete	Score
Gold	Christopher Hickey / Regent (USA)	70.725
Silver	Lauren Sammis / Sagacious HF (USA)	69.925
Bronze	Yvonne Losos de Muñiz / Bernstein las Marismas (DOM)	69.50
4th place	Tom Dvorak / Bernstein las Marismas (CAN)	69.45
5th place	Vera Protzen / Kadirmo (ARG)	68.02
6th place	Katherine Poulin-Neff / Brilliant Too (USA)	67.67
7th place	Andrea Bresee / Raffles (CAN)	66.92
8th place	Diane Creech / Wiona (CAN)	66.67
9th place	José Luis Padilla Moreno / Wiona (MEX)	65.50
10th place	Annabelle Collins / Medici (BER)	64.55

== Eventing results ==
The eventers complete a 3-star level dressage test, stadium, and cross-country course. 5 teams competed in the eventing competition: Argentina, Brazil, Canada, Chile, and the United States.

After the dressage test, the United States led with 143.40 penalty points, closely followed by Canada with 159.90 penalties, then host country Brazil with 173.20 in third, Argentina in 4th, and Chile in 5th.

The cross-country course was designed by Sue Benson of Great Britain. Run over 10 minutes, the 5,700-meter course had 27 obstacles and a total of 41 jumping efforts. After the cross-country phase, the Americans were in the gold medal position, with 154.80 penalties, followed by Canada with 177.10 penalty points, and bronze-medal placed Brazil with 192.60. Of the 26 horses which began cross-country, 21 finished. The teams from Argentina and Chile were eliminated during the cross-country phase.

All 21 horses made it through Sunday jog, moving on to the stadium course. Designed by Brazilian Guilherme Jorge, it was composed of 12 jumps with 15 obstacles, over 490 meters. Rails were quite common, with only 4 horses finishing without jump penalties and only 3 of those four going double-clear without any time penalties. The Americans finished the competition with the gold medal, the Canadians with the silver, and Brazil with the bronze.

=== Team eventing ===
The team results qualified Canada and Brazil to compete at the 2008 Olympic Games in eventing.

Medal	Athlete	Score
Gold	United States Karen O'Connor / Theodore O'Connor; Phillip Dutton / Truluck; Gina Miles / McKinlaigh; Stephen Bradley / From	162.8
Silver	Canada Kyle Carter / Madison Park; Sandra Donnelly / Buenos Aires; Waylon Roberts / Paleface; Michael Winter / Kingpin	211.1
Bronze	Brazil Fabrício Salgado / Butterfly; Carlos Paro / Political Mandate; Renan Guerreiro / Rodizio AA; André Paro / Land Heir	235.6

=== Individual eventing ===
Medal	Athlete	Score
Gold	Karen O'Connor / Theodore O'Connor (USA)	52.7
Silver	Phillip Dutton / Truluck (USA)	53.8
Bronze	Gina Miles / McKinlaigh (USA)	56.3
4th place	Darren Chiacchia / Better I Do It (USA)	66.2
5th place	Kyle Carter / Madison Park (CAN)	66.3
6th place	Sandra Donnelly / Buenos Aires (CAN)	69.7
7th place	Saulo Tristão / Totsie (BRA)	74.2
8th place	Mike Winter / Kingpin (CAN)	75.1
9th place	Renan Guerreiro / Rodizio AA (BRA)	76.7
10th place	Serguei Fofanoff / Ekus TW (BRA)	76.7

== Show jumping results ==
17 countries were represented in the show jumping competition, and there were a total of 10 teams: Argentina, Brazil (defending bronze medalists), Canada, Chile, Colombia, Ecuador, Guatemala, Mexico (defending silver medalists), the United States (defending gold medalists), and Venezuela.

The competition for team medals occurs over 2 days. Courses were all designed by Brazilian Guilherme Jorge, who also designed at the 2005 and 2007 World Cup Finals.

- Thursday, July 26: Table C Speed Class, max height 1.45m
- Friday, July 27: Table A Nations' Cup (2 rounds), max height 1.50m

The individual competition will then begin.

- Sunday, July 29: Table A (2 rounds), max height 1.60m

=== Team show jumping ===
The team results qualified Canada, Brazil, and Mexico to compete at the 2008 Olympic Games in show jumping.

Medal	Athlete	Score
Gold	Brazil Bernardo Alves / Chupa Chups 2 Pedro Veniss / Un Blancs De Blanc; César Almeida / Singular Joter II; Rodrigo Pessoa / Rufus	9.67
Silver	Canada Mac Cone / Melinda; Jill Henselwood / Special Ed; Eric Lamaze / Hickstead; Ian Millar / In Style	14.72
Bronze	United States Lauren Hough / Casadora; Cara Raether / Ublesco; Laura Chapot / Little Big Man; Todd Minikus / Pavarotti	27.20
4th place	Mexico Santiago Lambre / Curant; Simon Nizri / Cataro Ask; Eduardo Salas / RMW Estina; Jose Antonio Chedraui / Don Porfirio	34.89
5th place	Argentina Maximiliano Amaya / Church Road; Matias Albarracin / Gama Cocu; Martin Dopazo / El Capricho Coral; Ricardo Kierkegaard / Rey	64.25
6th place	Guatemala Wylder Rodriguez / Pompidu; Augusto Diaz Duran/ Rubina; Eduardo El Castillo / Paesen; Juan Andrés Rodríguez / Orestus VDL	87.98
7th place	Colombia Ricardo Illa / Calico Z Mauricio Ruiz / Ratoucha; Carlos Hernando Ramirez / Amazonas	99.59
Eliminated	Venezuela Chile; Ecuador	ELIM

=== Individual show jumping ===
Medal	Athlete	Score
Gold	Jill Henselwood / Special Ed (CAN)	4.00
Silver	Rodrigo Pessoa / Rufus (BRA)	5.74
Bronze	Eric Lamaze / Hickstead (CAN)	6.43
4th place	Ian Millar / In Style (CAN)	9.29
5th place	Pedro Veniss / Un Blancs de Blanc (BRA)	10.84
6th place	Bernardo Alves / Chupa Chup (BRA)	13.09
7th place	José Antonio Chedraui / Don Porfirio (MEX)	14.85
8th place	Cara Raether / Ublesco (USA)	20.53
9th place	César Almeida / Singular Joter II (BRA)	20.66
10th place	Pablo Barrios / Sun God (VEN)	36.03

== Medal table ==
Rank	Nation	Gold	Silver	Bronze	Total
1	United States	4	2	2	8
2	Canada	1	3	1	5
3	Brazil	1	1	2	4
4	Dominican Republic	0	0	1	1
Totals (4 entries)		6	6	6	18
