= Vyacheslav Poyto =

Belarusian equestrian

Personal information
- Nationality: Belarusian
- Born: 11 November 1982 (age 42); Minsk, Belarus

Sport
- Sport: Equestrian

Vyacheslav Poyto (born 11 November 1982) is a Belarusian equestrian. He competed in the individual eventing at the 2008 Summer Olympics.
