= Igor Atrokhov =

Russian equestrian

Personal information
- Nationality: Russian
- Born: 18 January 1960 (age 65); Moscow, Russia

Sport
- Sport: Equestrian

Igor Atrokhov (born 18 January 1960) is a Russian equestrian. He competed in the individual eventing at the 2008 Summer Olympics.
