= Gina Miles =

American equestrian

Personal information
- Born: November 27, 1973 (age 52) San Francisco, California, U.S.
Medal record
Equestrian
Representing United States
Olympic Games
| Silver medal – second place | 2008 Beijing | Individual eventing |
Pan American Games
| Gold medal – first place | 2007 Rio de Janeiro | Team eventing |
| Silver medal – second place | 2007 Rio de Janeiro | Individual eventing |

Gina Miles (born November 27, 1973) is an American eventing rider. Riding McKinlaigh, owned by Thom Schulz and Laura Coats, Miles won a silver medal in individual eventing at the 2008 Summer Olympics.

== Early life ==
She was born November 27, 1973, in San Francisco, California. Miles attended the 1984 Olympics in Los Angeles, California, which is where she got her dream of competing herself. In particular, she dreamed of competing in the Three-Day Eventing event. She started teaching when she was 15.

== Career ==
Miles began riding McKinlaigh in 2000. In 2002, she competed with him in the Rolex Kentucky Three Day Event and went on to place in the top 25 in the World Equestrian Games Also in 2002, she attended the World Equestrian Games in Jerez, Spain, in order to represent the U.S. she In 2003, she won the World Cup Final bronze medal.

In 2007, she and McKinlaigh won the individual bronze medal and the team gold in eventing at the Pan American Games. They competed in the 2008 Olympic Games in Beijing, winning individual silver in Three-Day Eventing.

After the Olympics, Miles spent her time giving back to the equestrian community. She trained other riders through her own facility in Danville, California, Gold Medal Equestrian. She accepted all ages in eventing, show jumping, and dressage. As a former Pony club examiner, she also had her own riding center.

In 2015, McKinlaigh was inducted into the United States Eventing Association (USEA) Hall of Fame.

== Horse ==
The horse who won the events: McKinlaigh, Irish Sport horse liver-chestnut gelding by Highland King and out of Kilcumney Hostess. Owned by Gina Miles, Thomas Schulz, and Laura Coats.

== Personal ==
Miles resides in Templeton, California. Miles was previously married to Morgan Miles and they share two children. She gives clinics to aspiring riders and trains horses for eventing. at her facility in Templeton.
