= André Paro =

Brazilian equestrian

Personal information
- Born: 7 April 1975 (age 51) Colina, Brazil

Sport
- Sport: Equestrian
Medal record
Equestrian
Representing Brazil
Pan American Games
Bronze medal – third place	2007 Rio de Janeiro	Team eventing

André Paro (born 7 April 1975) is a Brazilian equestrian. He competed at the 2004 Summer Olympics and the 2008 Summer Olympics.
