= Samantha Albert =

Canadian-born equestrian (born 1971)

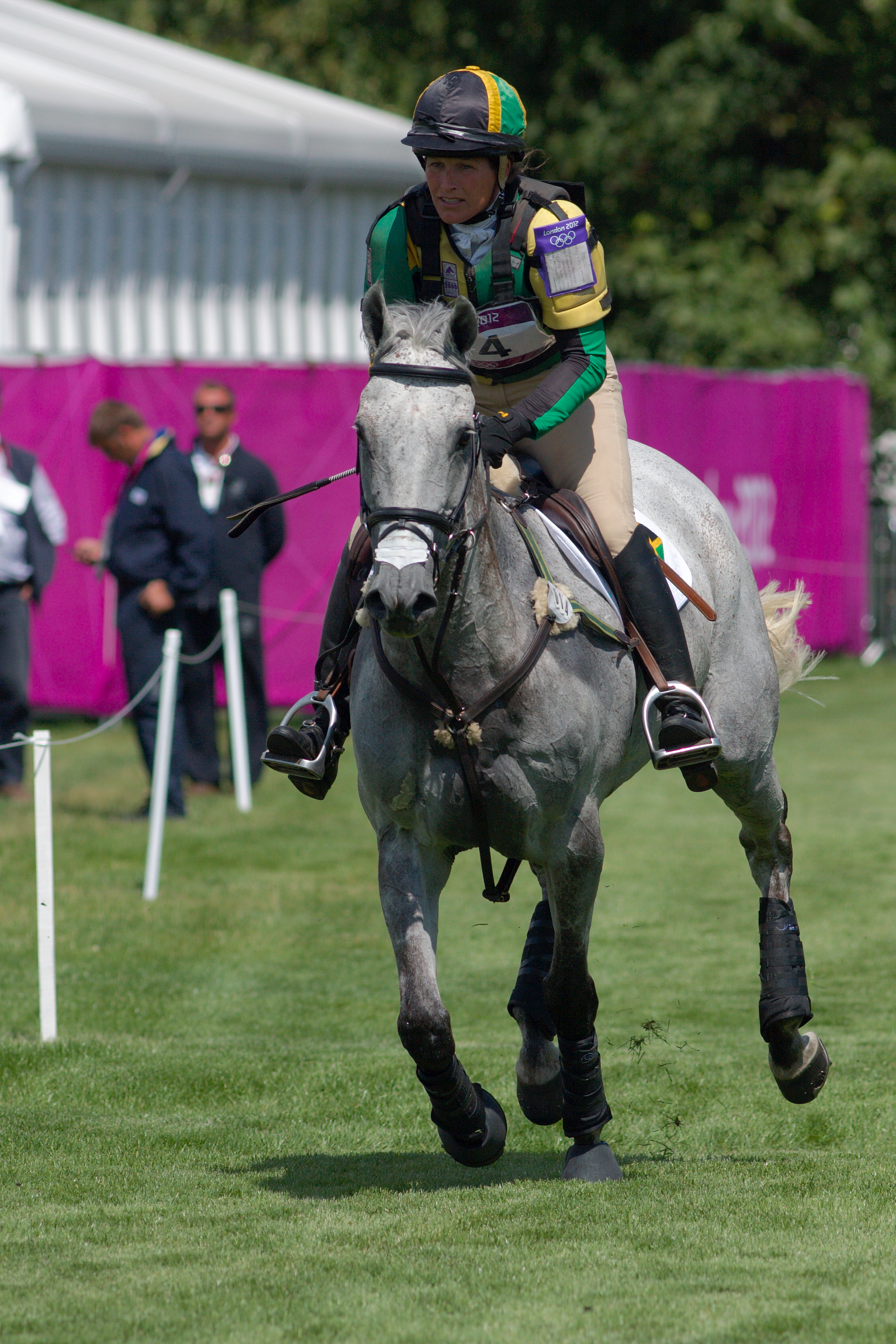
- Samantha Albert and Carraig Dubh competing at the 2012 Summer Olympics in London.
- Born: Samantha Majendie; 31 May 1971 (age 55); Montreal, Quebec, Canada
- Known for: Equestrian competitor for Jamaica
- Spouse: Dag Albert
- Children: Toby Albert
- Website: samanthaalbert.com

Samantha Majendie-Albert (born 31 May 1971) is a Canadian-born equestrian who represents Jamaica in international competition.

She was born in Montreal, Quebec, Canada to a Jamaican mother and an English father, and grew up in Canada and Jamaica. She moved to Bassett, England in 1989 where she currently resides.

Albert competed at the 2007 Pan Am Games and represented Jamaica in the 2008 Summer Olympic and 2012 Summer Olympic individual equestrian events.

Samantha was married to the fellow eventing rider Dag Albert, who represented Sweden at two Olympics. They have divorced in 2005.
