= Katrin Norling =

Swedish equestrian

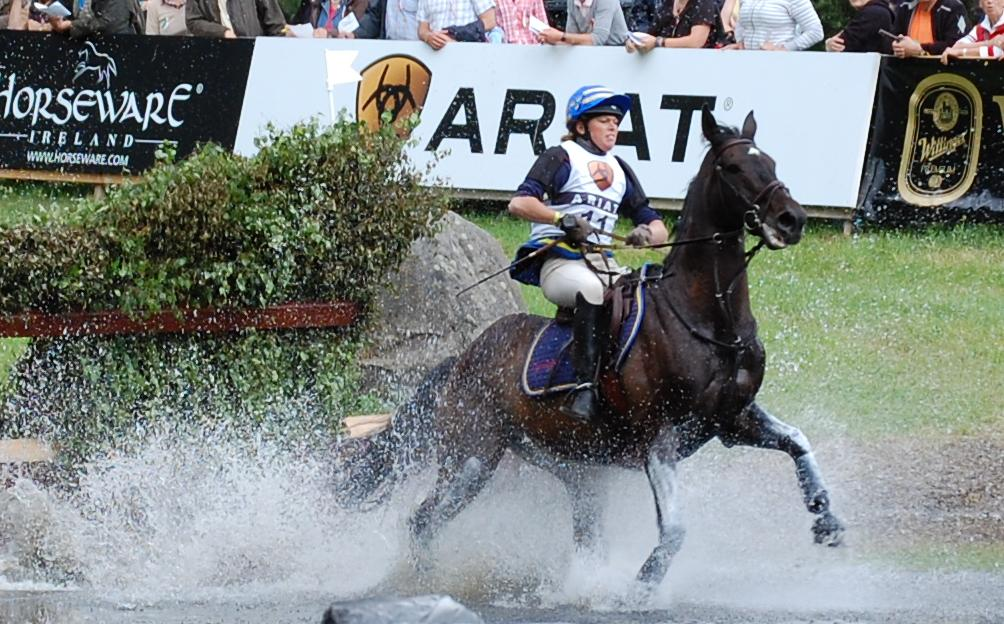
- Katrin Norling at the 2011 European Championships

Personal information
- Born: 4 April 1979 (age 47) Ödeshög, Sweden

Katrin Norling (born 4 April 1979 in Ödeshög, Sweden) is a Swedish Olympic eventing rider. Representing Sweden, she competed at the 2008 Summer Olympics where she placed 4th in team and 18th in the individual eventing.

Norling also participated at two World Equestrian Games (in 2002 and 2010) and at four European Eventing Championships (in 2005, 2007, 2009 and 2011). She finished 4th in team competition at the 2009 Europeans.
