= Harald Ambros =

Austrian equestrian (born 1980)

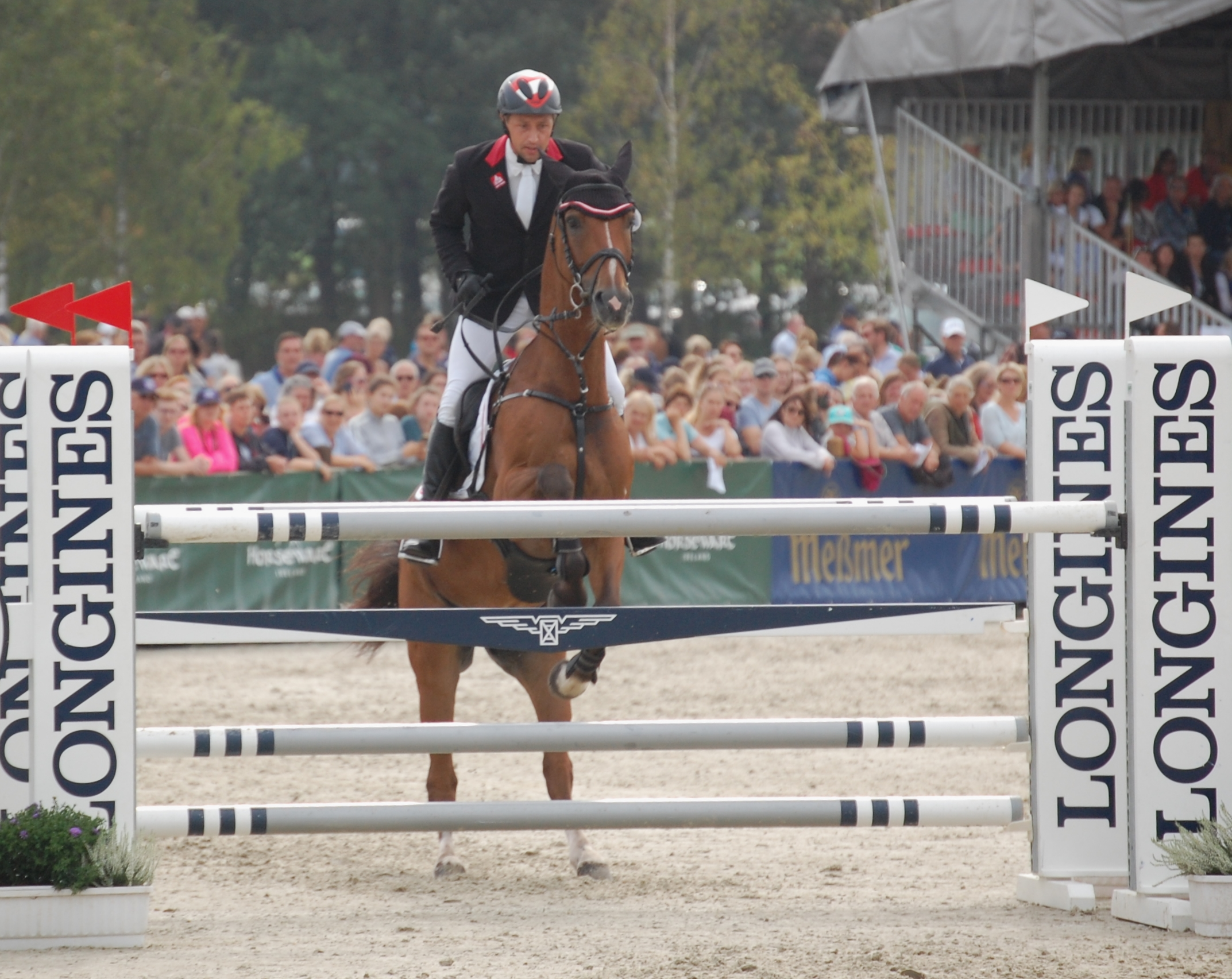
Harald Ambros and Lexikon, 2019 European Eventing Championship

Harald Ambros (born 19 March 1980) is an Austrian equestrian. He competed in the Individual eventing at the 2004, 2008 and 2012 Summer Olympics. Ambros also competed at the 2024 Summer Olympics.

Ambros was born in Linz.
