= Humburky =

- Municipality
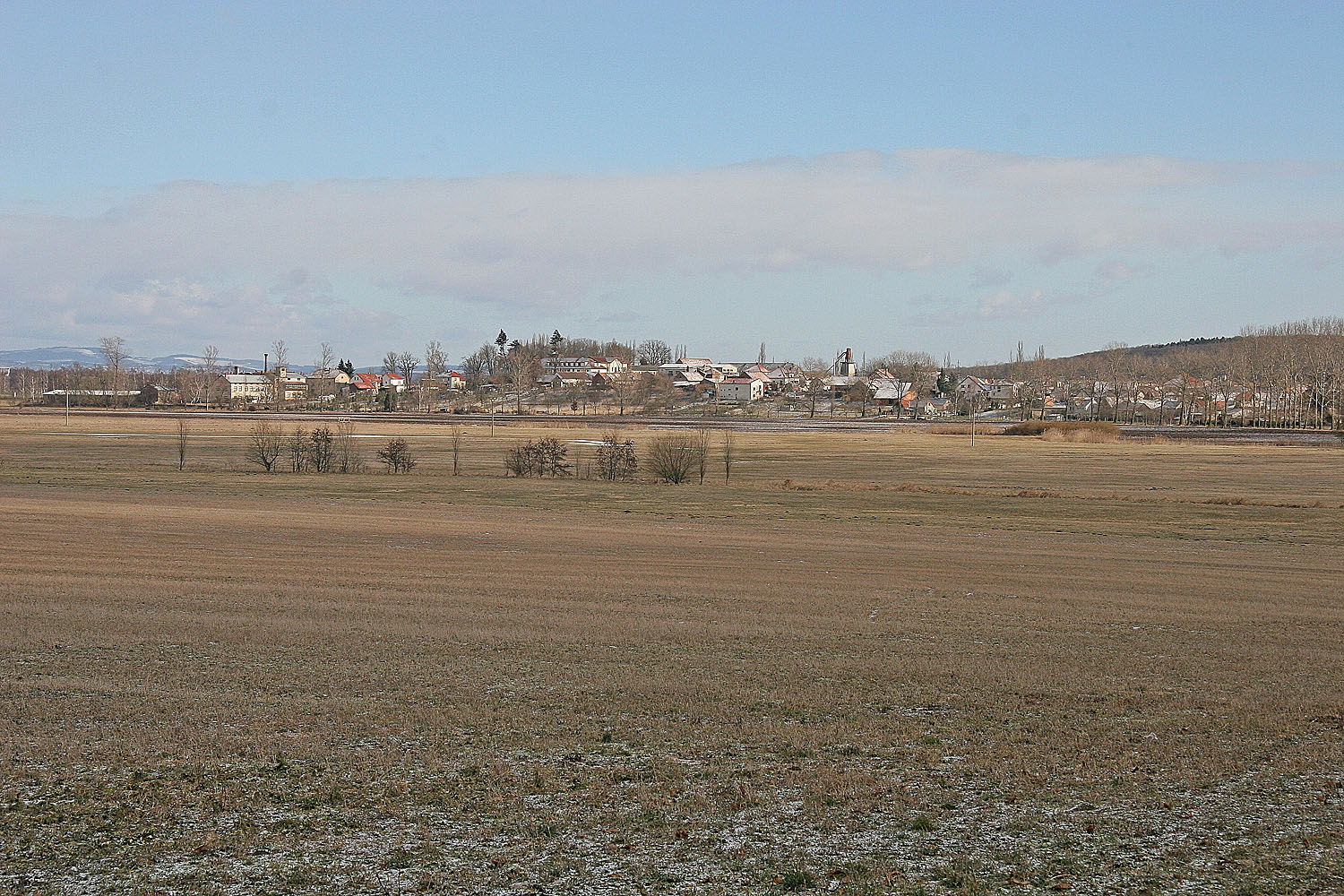
- View from the southwest

- Flag Coat of arms

- Location in the Czech Republic
- Coordinates: 50°13′34″N 15°30′42″E
- Country: Czech Republic
- Region: Hradec Králové
- District: Hradec Králové
- First mentioned: 1359

Area
  - Total: 2.59 km^{2} (1.00 sq mi)
- Elevation: 231 m (758 ft)

Population (2026-01-01)
  - Total: 398
  - Density: 154/km^{2} (398/sq mi)
- Time zone: UTC+1 (CET)
  - Summer (DST): UTC+2 (CEST)
- Postal code: 504 01
- Website: www.humburky.cz

Humburky (Czech pronunciation: [ˈɦumburkɪ]) is a municipality and village in Hradec Králové District in the Hradec Králové Region of the Czech Republic. It has about 400 inhabitants.

== Geography ==
Humburky is located about 21 kilometres (13 mi) west of Hradec Králové. It lies in a flat agricultural landscape of the East Elbe Table. It is situated on the left bank of the Cidlina River.

== Demographics ==
Historical population
Year	Pop.	±%
1869	303	—
1880	302	−0.3%
1890	336	+11.3%
1900	363	+8.0%
1910	356	−1.9%
1921	339	−4.8%
1930	376	+10.9%
1950	265	−29.5%
1961	276	+4.2%
1970	270	−2.2%
1980	272	+0.7%
1991	263	−3.3%
2001	324	+23.2%
2011	358	+10.5%
2021	408	+14.0%
Source: Censuses
