= Heelan Tompkins =

New Zealand equestrian

Personal information
- Born: 10 April 1978 (age 48)

Sport
- Country: New Zealand
- Sport: Equestrian
- Event: Eventing

Heelan Tompkins (born 10 April 1978) is a New Zealand equestrian. She competed in eventing at the 2008 Summer Olympics in Beijing.
