= Courageous Comet =

American Thoroughbred event horse

Courageous Comet (1996) is a champion event horse. Courageous Comet, called Comet, is an off the track Thoroughbred gelding sired by Comet Shine and out of Rosanelli. Owned by Tom Holder, Comet has been ridden by and competed with Becky Holder since 2005. Since then they have built up an impressive resume: members of the United States 2008 Olympic team, 2010 World Equestrian Games Competitors, have won the Adequan USEA Gold CUP Series in 2007 and 2012, was named 2009 Rood & Riddle Thoroughbred Sport Horse of the Year, and won the American Eventing Championships in 2012.

== Racing career ==
As a young racehorse Courageous Comet earned $71,780 and spent most of his career racing in the Allowance ranks. He won only four of his 36 racing starts, but finished with a win at Finger Lakes in a $4000 Claiming race. After Comet’s racing career ended he was sent to a foxhunting barn and Thoroughbred resale business in New York’s Genesee Valley owned by the Donnans where he learned to fox hunt be for being sold as an event prospect to Faye Woolf and then later to Tom Holder.

== Retirement ==
Comet was retired from upper level competition in the fall of 2012. His last competition was the American Evening Championships at Chattahoochee Hills. In retirement Comet will become a mount for owner, Tom Holder, at lower levels of eventing.
