= Dag Albert =

Swedish equestrian

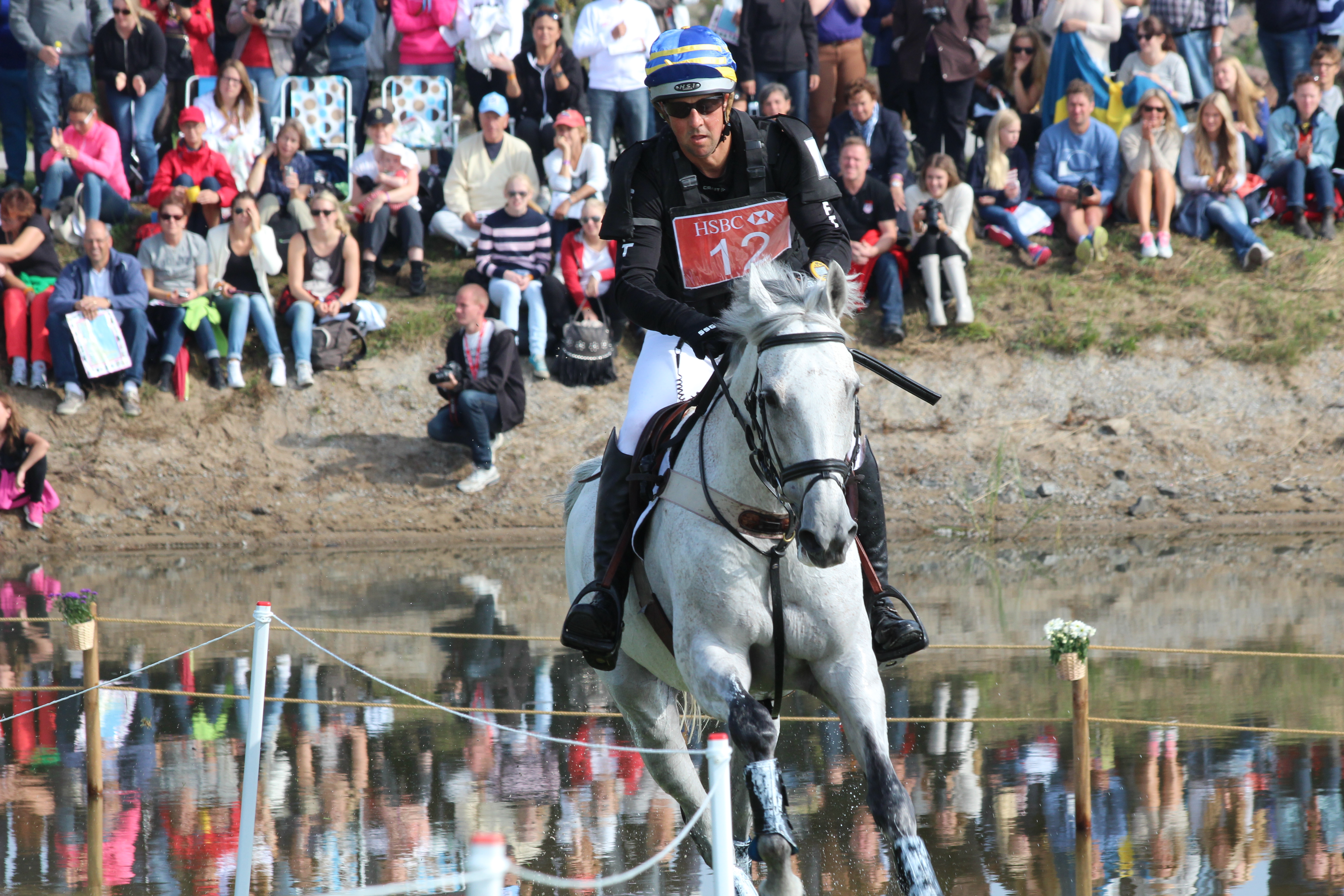
- Dag Albert and Tubbel Rebel at the 2013 European Championships

Personal information
- Born: 17 November 1969 (age 56) Strömstad, Sweden

Dag Albert (born 17 November 1969 in Strömstad, Sweden) is a Swedish Olympic eventing rider. Representing Sweden, he competed at two Summer Olympics (in 1996 and 2008). He placed 4th in team eventing in 2008. His current best individual Olympic placement is 31st place, also from 2008.

Albert also participated in two World Equestrian Games (in 2006 and 2014) and five European Eventing Championships (in 2005, 2007, 2009, 2011 and 2013). He finished 4th in team competition at three European championships (in 2007, 2009 and 2011).

Dag Albert was married to the fellow eventing rider Samantha Albert, who represented Jamaica at two Olympics. They have two children, Miles and Toby Albert. They divorced in 2005. Then went on to marry Elizabeth Morton, who has had children Maja and Tomas Albert
