= McKinlaigh =

Irish Sport Horse (1994–2020)

- Sire: Highland King
- Dam: Kilcumney Hostess
- Sex: Gelding
- Foaled: 5 May 1994
- Died: 18 January 2020
- Color: Chestnut
- Breeder: Yvonne Walsh
- Trainer: Gina Miles

Major wins
- Team gold, individual bronze in 2007 Pan American Games; Individual silver in 2008 Beijing Olympics

Honors
- USEA Horse of the Year; Inducted into USEA Hall of Fame

McKinlaigh (5 May 1994–18 January 2020) was an Irish Sport Horse who competed internationally in the sport of eventing for the United States. With rider Gina Miles, he won team gold in the 2007 Pan American Games, and individual silver in the 2008 Olympic Games.

== Life and career ==
McKinlaigh was foaled in County Carlow, Ireland, in 1994. He was a liver chestnut Irish Sport Horse gelding sired by Highland King out of Kilcumney Hostess. He was bred by Yvonne Walsh. McKinlaigh stands 17.3 hands (71 inches, 180 cm). As a three-year-old McKinlaigh was sold to Chris Ryan, who trained him under saddle and competed him in his first event. McKinlaigh was later sold to the Schultz family. In 2000 McKinlaigh was imported to America and became the mount of eventer Gina Miles, who was managing the Schultz's California ranch at the time. Competing for the United States, McKinlaigh and Miles placed in the top 25 at the 2002 World Equestrian Games in Jerez, Spain. McKinlaigh also competed in the Rolex Kentucky Three Day Event for the first time in 2002. In 2006, he was the United States Eventing Association's Horse of the Year. Miles and McKinlaigh were part of the gold medal-winning American team in the 2007 Pan American Games, and won bronze individually. In 2008, Miles and McKinlaigh competed on the US Olympic team in the Beijing Olympics, winning silver individually; the American team did not medal due to many faults on the cross-country course. In 2015, McKinlaigh was inducted into the United States Eventing Association Hall of Fame for his notable career and Olympic accomplishment.
