= Jean Renaud Adde =

French equestrian

Personal information
- Nationality: French
- Born: 24 October 1970 (age 54); Bourg-la-Reine, France
- Height: 1.81 m (5 ft 11 in)
- Weight: 70 kg (150 lb)

Sport
- Sport: Equestrian

Jean Renaud Adde (born 24 October 1970) is a French equestrian. He competed in the 2008 Summer Olympics.
