= Becky Holder =

American equestrian

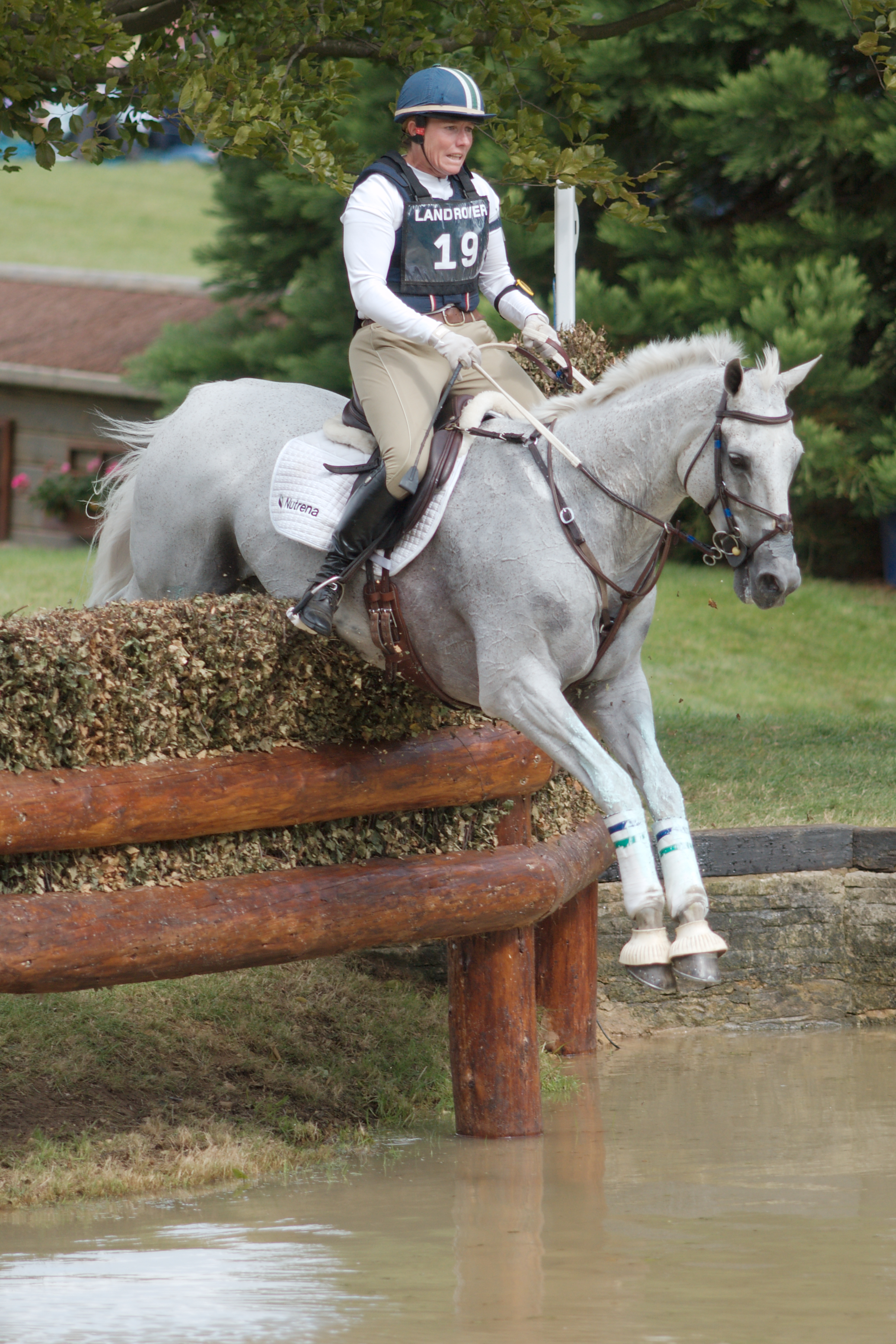

Personal information
- Born: April 24, 1969 (age 55); Mendota Heights, Minnesota, United States

Sport
- Country: United States
- Sport: Equestrian

Rebecca Holder (born April 24, 1969) is an equestrian who qualified for the Eventing competition of the 2008 Summer Olympics in Beijing from Mendota Heights, Minnesota, competing for the United States in her first Olympics. She has been riding the 12-year-old, Courageous Comet, a gray off-the-track thoroughbred gelding, since 2002. Recent successes include the pair finishing second at the 2008 Rolex Kentucky CCI**** in April, 2008. They were in the lead heading into the show jumping but had two rails and fell behind Phillip Dutton and the stunning Connaught. Stadium seems to be the pair's weak point. At The Rolex Kentucky Three Day Event in 2006, Becky also went into show jumping in the lead but had 4 rails down and several time faults, dropping them into a disappointing 13th place.

At the Olympics, she placed fifth in the Individual Eventing Dressage competition with a score of 35.8 penalty points. She had two mistakes in her cross-country run, dropping her out of the running for a medal. Becky was the alternate member on the U.S Eventing squad in the 2000 Sydney Olympics.

Holder used to run a part-time teaching business out of Carriage House Farm in Hugo, Minnesota. From November to May, she trains her upper level horses in North Carolina.
