= Kyle Carter (equestrian) =

Canadian equestrian

Personal information
- Born: 8 January 1969 (age 57) Calgary, Alberta, Canada

Sport
- Sport: Equestrian
Medal record
Equestrian
Representing Canada
World Championships
Silver medal – second place	2010 Kentucky	Team eventing
Pan American Games
Silver medal – second place	2007 Rio de Janeiro	Team eventing

Kyle Carter (born 8 January 1969) is a Canadian equestrian who won a silver medal as part of the Canadian team at the 2010 Kentucky World Equestrian Games. In 1999, Kyle was part of the 1999 Winnipeg Pan American Games and placed second at the Rolex Kentucky Three Day Event. Carter has been recognized as the coach with the highest number of gold medal finishes at the North American Junior and Young Rider Championships. He competed in the 2007 Rio de Janeiro Pan American Games and in the 2008 Summer Olympics.
