= Alena Tseliapushkina =

Belarusian equestrian

Alena Tseliapushkina (born 22 January 1969 in Korchevjina) is a Belarusian equestrian. At the 2012 Summer Olympics she competed in the Individual eventing.
