= Mike Winter (equestrian) =

Canadian equestrian

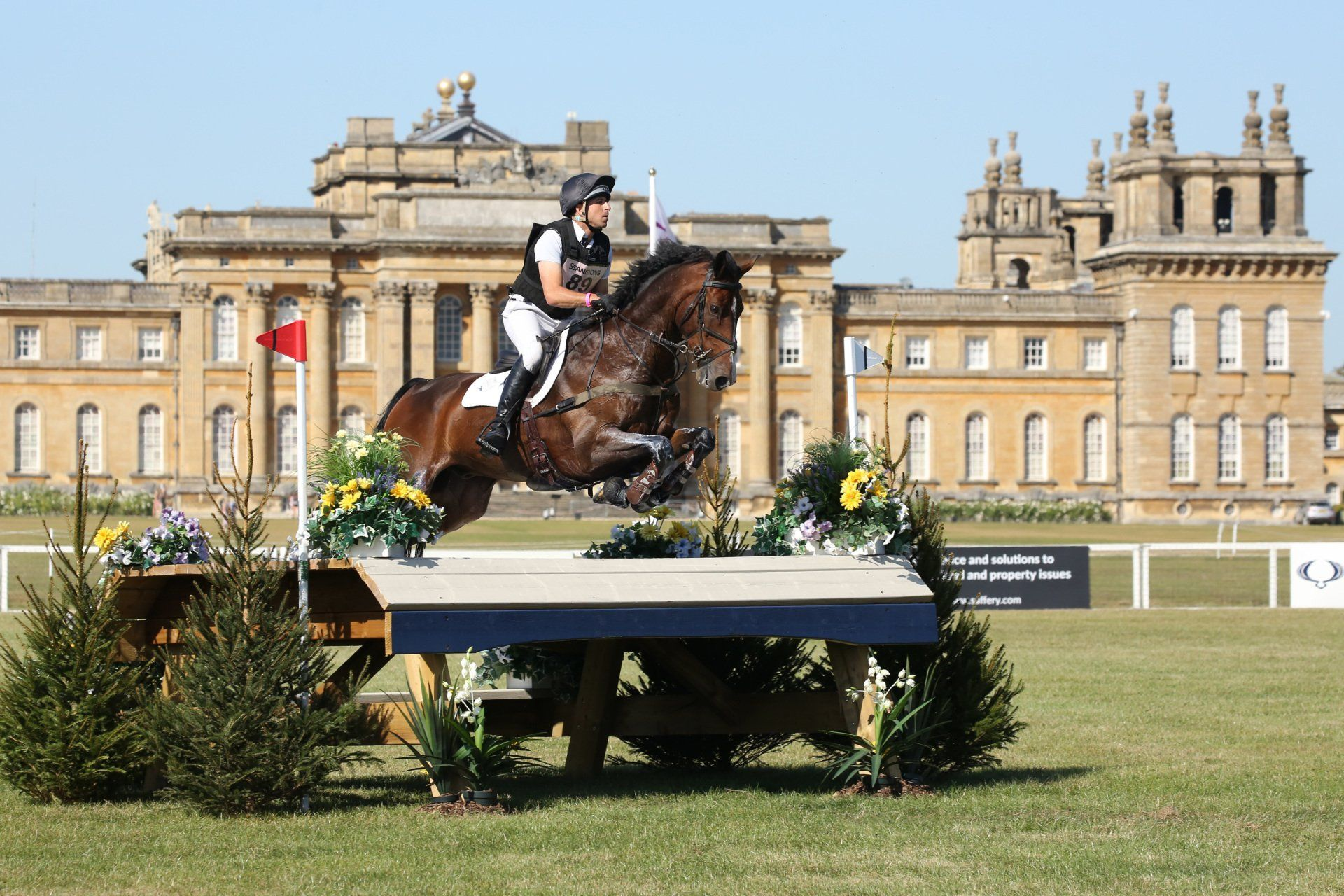

Personal information
- Full name: Michael Winter
- Discipline: Eventing
- Born: 16 August 1974 (age 51); Montreal, Quebec, Canada
- Home town: Toronto, Ontario, Canada
- Height: 171 cm (5 ft 7 in)
Medal record
Equestrian
Representing Canada
Pan American Games
Gold medal – first place	2023 Santiago	Team eventing
Silver medal – second place	2003 Fair Hill	Team eventing
Silver medal – second place	2007 Rio de Janeiro	Team eventing

Michael Winter (born 16 August 1974) is a Canadian equestrian. He competed at the 2004 Summer Olympics and the 2008 Summer Olympics. Winter also competed at the 2003 Pan American Games, 2007 Pan American Games, 2023 Pan American Games, and 2024 Summer Olympics.
