= Petříkov (České Budějovice District) =

- Municipality
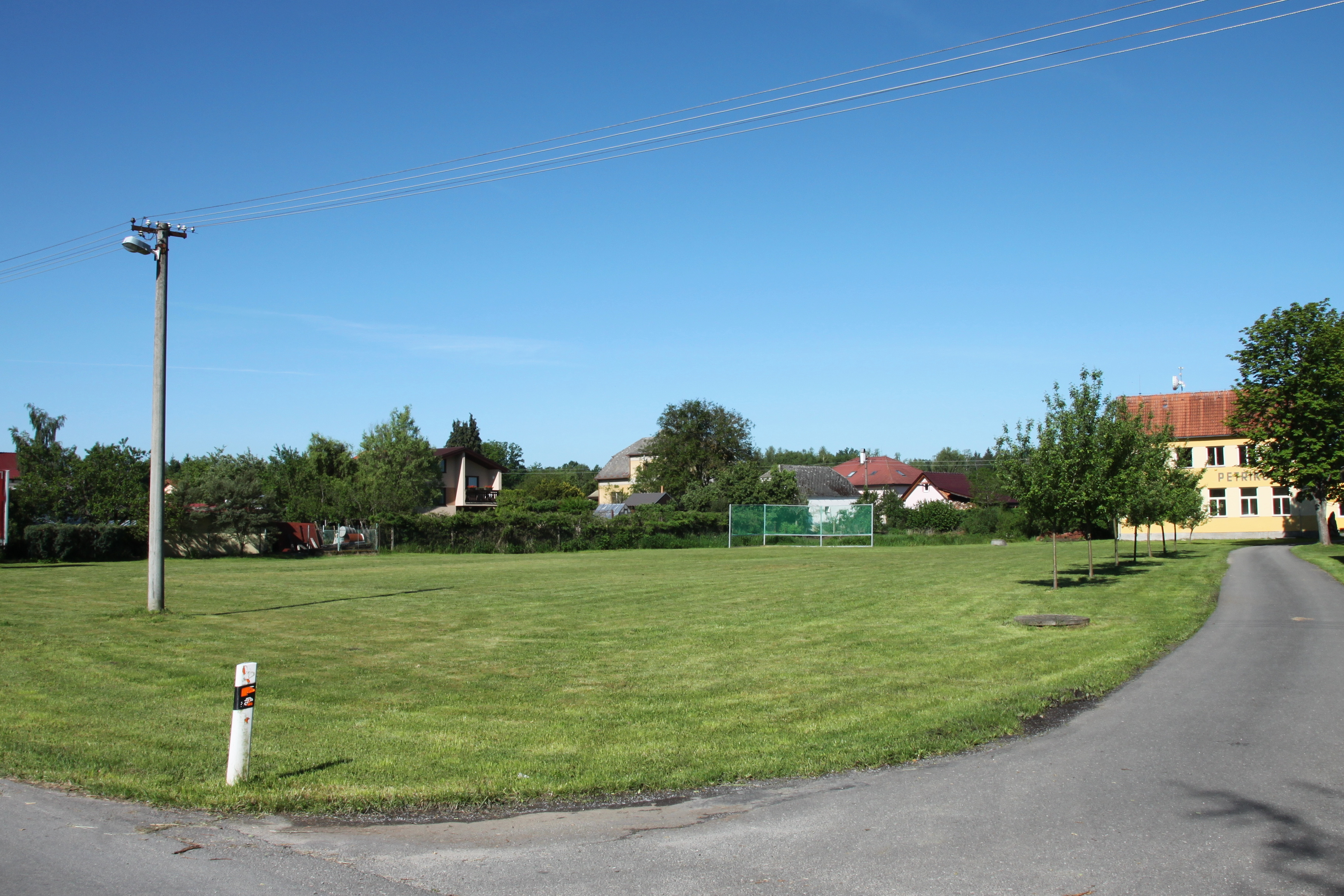
- Football field at the primary school

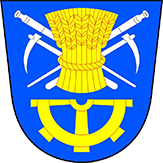
- Coat of arms

- Location in the Czech Republic
- Coordinates: 48°50′49″N 14°45′17″E
- Country: Czech Republic
- Region: South Bohemian
- District: České Budějovice
- Founded: 1790

Area
  - Total: 19.36 km^{2} (7.47 sq mi)
- Elevation: 460 m (1,510 ft)

Population (2026-01-01)
  - Total: 322
  - Density: 16.6/km^{2} (43.1/sq mi)
- Time zone: UTC+1 (CET)
  - Summer (DST): UTC+2 (CEST)
- Postal code: 374 01
- Website: www.petrikov-obec.cz

Petříkov is a municipality and village in České Budějovice District in the South Bohemian Region of the Czech Republic. It has about 300 inhabitants.

Petříkov lies approximately 25 kilometres (16 mi) south-east of České Budějovice and 140 km (87 mi) south of Prague.

== Administrative division ==
Petříkov consists of two municipal parts (in brackets population according to the 2021 census):

- Petříkov (200)
- Těšínov (78)

== Demographics ==
Historical population
Year	Pop.	±%
1869	609	—
1880	722	+18.6%
1890	885	+22.6%
1900	834	−5.8%
1910	647	−22.4%
1921	592	−8.5%
1930	556	−6.1%
1950	336	−39.6%
1961	387	+15.2%
1970	350	−9.6%
1980	302	−13.7%
1991	274	−9.3%
2001	261	−4.7%
2011	277	+6.1%
2021	278	+0.4%
Source: Censuses
