= Sandra Donnelly =

Canadian equestrian

Personal information
- Born: 26 September 1969 (age 56) Calgary, Alberta, Canada

Sport
- Sport: Equestrian
Medal record
Equestrian
Representing Canada
Pan American Games
Silver medal – second place	2007 Rio de Janeiro	Team eventing

Sandra Donnelly (born 26 September 1969) is a Canadian equestrian. She competed in two events at the 2008 Summer Olympics.
