= Joe Meyer (equestrian) =

New Zealand equestrian

Personal information
- Born: 27 October 1970 (age 55)

Sport
- Country: New Zealand
- Sport: Equestrian
- Event: Eventing

Joe Meyer (born 27 October 1970) is a New Zealand equestrian. He competed in eventing at the 2008 Summer Olympics in Beijing.
