= Saulo Tristão =

Brazilian equestrian

Personal information
- Born: 15 August 1988 (age 36); São Paulo, Brazil

Sport
- Sport: Equestrian

Saulo Tristão (born 15 August 1988) is a Brazilian equestrian. He competed in two events at the 2008 Summer Olympics.
