= Petříkov (Prague-East District) =

- Municipality
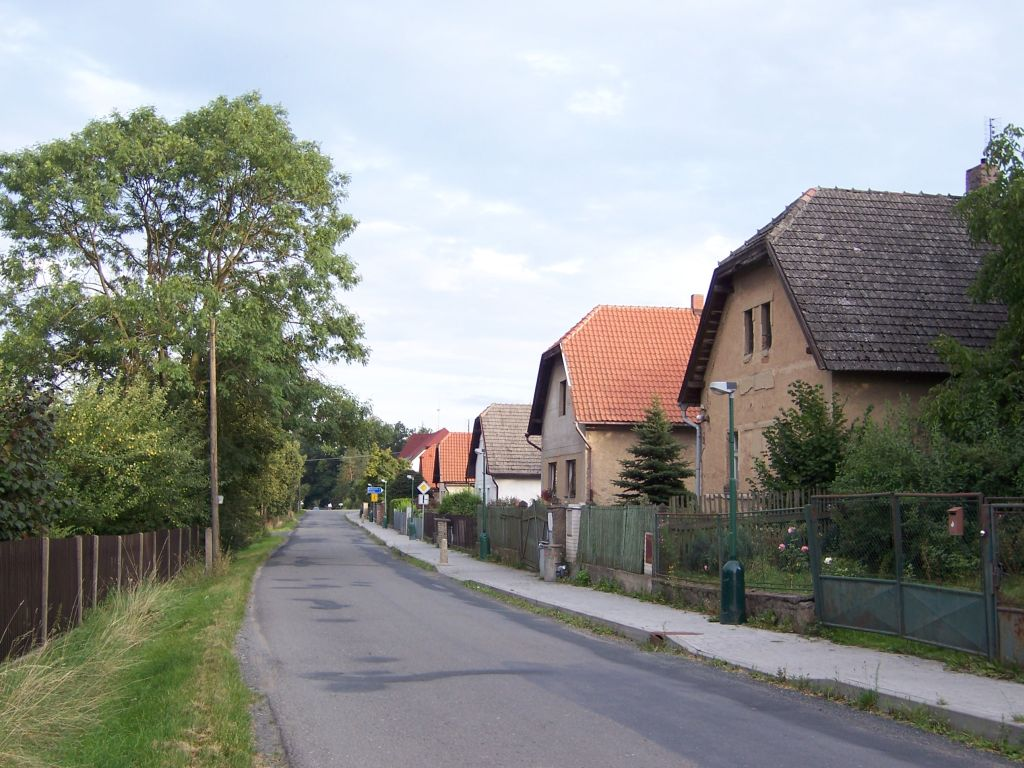
- A road in Petříkov

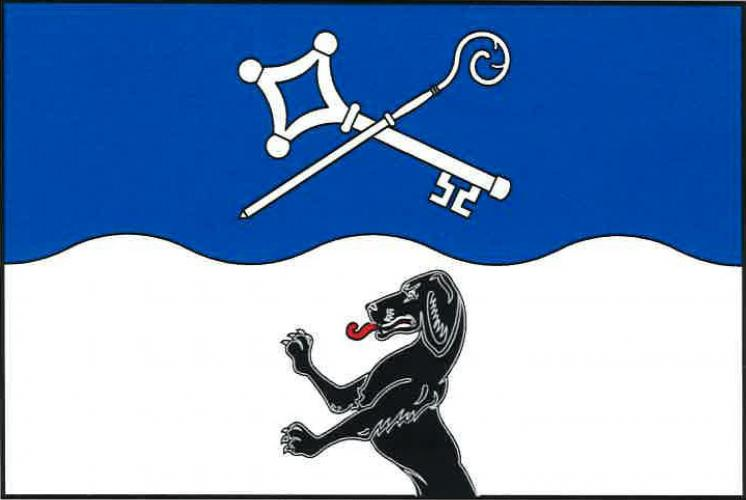
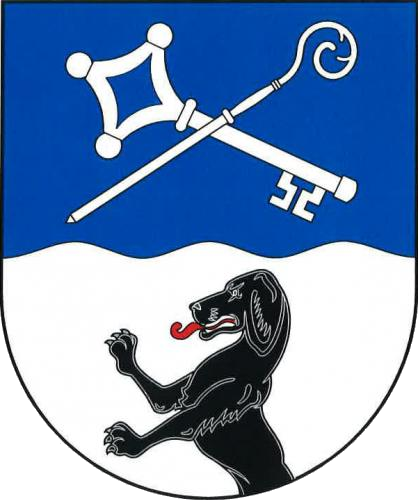
- Flag Coat of arms

- Location in the Czech Republic
- Coordinates: 49°55′31″N 14°37′1″E
- Country: Czech Republic
- Region: Central Bohemian
- District: Prague-East
- First mentioned: 1405

Area
  - Total: 4.70 km^{2} (1.81 sq mi)
- Elevation: 444 m (1,457 ft)

Population (2026-01-01)
  - Total: 648
  - Density: 138/km^{2} (357/sq mi)
- Time zone: UTC+1 (CET)
  - Summer (DST): UTC+2 (CEST)
- Postal code: 251 69
- Website: www.obecpetrikov.cz

Petříkov is a municipality and village in Prague-East District in the Central Bohemian Region of the Czech Republic. It has about 600 inhabitants.

== Administrative division ==
Petříkov consists of two municipal parts (in brackets population according to the 2021 census):

- Petříkov (518)
- Radimovice (77)

== Demographics ==
Historical population
Year	Pop.	±%
1869	341	—
1880	333	−2.3%
1890	340	+2.1%
1900	336	−1.2%
1910	338	+0.6%
1921	351	+3.8%
1930	371	+5.7%
1950	293	−21.0%
1961	296	+1.0%
1970	276	−6.8%
1980	290	+5.1%
1991	298	+2.8%
2001	330	+10.7%
2011	476	+44.2%
2021	595	+25.0%
Source: Censuses
