= Magnus Gällerdal =

Swedish equestrian

Personal information
- Nationality: Swedish
- Born: 10 August 1979 (age 45); Linköping, Sweden

Sport
- Sport: Equestrian

Magnus Gällerdal (born 10 August 1979) is a Swedish equestrian. He competed at the 2004 Summer Olympics and the 2008 Summer Olympics.
