= Viktoria Carlerbäck =

Swedish equestrian

Personal information
- Nationality: Swedish
- Born: 27 January 1973 (age 52); Borås, Sweden

Sport
- Sport: Equestrian

Viktoria Carlerbäck (born 27 January 1973) is a Swedish equestrian. She competed in two events at the 2008 Summer Olympics.
