= Ireland at the 2008 Summer Olympics =

- IOC code: IRL
- NOC: Olympic Federation of Ireland
- Website: olympics.ie

in Beijing
- Competitors: 54 in 12 sports
- Flag bearers: Ciara Peelo (opening); Kenny Egan (closing)
- Medals Ranked 61st: Gold 0 Silver 1 Bronze 2 Total 3

Summer Olympics appearances (overview)
- 1924; 1928; 1932; 1936; 1948; 1952; 1956; 1960; 1964; 1968; 1972; 1976; 1980; 1984; 1988; 1992; 1996; 2000; 2004; 2008; 2012; 2016; 2020; 2024

Other related appearances
- Great Britain (1896–1920)

Ireland competed in the 2008 Summer Olympics, held in Beijing, China. It was the 19th Summer Games that Ireland contested as a nation under the Olympic Council of Ireland.

== Medalists ==
Medal	Name	Sport	Event
Silver	Kenny Egan	Boxing	Light heavyweight
Bronze	Darren Sutherland	Boxing	Middleweight
Bronze	Paddy Barnes	Boxing	Light flyweight

== Athletics ==
16 Irish athletes qualified for 17 different Olympic events in 2008.

Key

- Note–Ranks given for track events are within the athlete's heat only
- Q = Qualified for the next round
- q = Qualified for the next round as a fastest loser or, in field events, by position without achieving the qualifying target
- NR = National record
- N/A = Round not applicable for the event
- Bye = Athlete not required to compete in round

Men
Track & road events

Athlete	Event	Heat		Quarterfinal		Semifinal		Final	
Athlete	Event	Result	Rank	Result	Rank	Result	Rank	Result	Rank
Paul Hession	200 m	20.59	3 Q	20.32	1 Q	20.38	5	Did not advance	
David Gillick	400 m	45.83	4	—N/a		Did not advance			
Thomas Chamney	800 m	1:47.66	5	—N/a		Did not advance			
Alistair Cragg	1500 m	3:44.90	8	—N/a		Did not advance			
Alistair Cragg	5000 m	13:38.57	6 q	—N/a				DNF	
Martin Fagan	Marathon	—N/a						DNF	
Robert Heffernan	20 km walk	—N/a						1:20:36	8
Jamie Costin	50 km walk	—N/a						4:15:16	44
Colin Griffin	50 km walk	—N/a						DSQ	

Women
Track & road events

Athlete	Event	Heat		Semifinal		Final	
Athlete	Event	Result	Rank	Result	Rank	Result	Rank
Joanne Cuddihy	400 m	53.32	6	Did not advance			
Derval O'Rourke	100 m hurdles	13.22	6	Did not advance			
Michelle Carey	400 m hurdles	57.99	7	Did not advance			
Fionnuala Britton	3000 m steeplechase	9:43.57	10	—N/a		Did not advance	
Roisin McGettigan	3000 m steeplechase	9:28.92	2 Q	—N/a		9:55.89	14
Pauline Curley	Marathon	—N/a				2:47:16	63
Olive Loughnane	20 km walk	—N/a				1:27:45	7

Field events

Athlete	Event	Qualification		Final	
Athlete	Event	Distance	Position	Distance	Position
Eileen O'Keeffe	Hammer throw	67.66	23	Did not advance	

== Badminton ==
Athlete	Event	Round of 64	Round of 32	Round of 16	Quarterfinal	Semifinal	Final / BM	
Athlete	Event	Opposition Score	Opposition Score	Opposition Score	Opposition Score	Opposition Score	Opposition Score	Rank
Scott Evans	Men's singles	Zwiebler (GER); L 18–21, 21–18, 19–21	Did not advance					
Chloe Magee	Women's singles	Tolmoff (EST); W 18–21, 21–18, 21–19	Jun J-y (KOR); L 12–21, 13–21	Did not advance				

== Boxing ==
Ireland qualified five boxers for the Olympic boxing tournament. Barnes became the first when he qualified at the World Championships. Nevin was the second, qualifying at the first European qualifying event. Joyce, Sutherland, and Egan brought the number to five at the 2nd European tournament.

Athlete	Event	Round of 32	Round of 16	Quarterfinals	Semifinals	Final	
Athlete	Event	Opposition Result	Opposition Result	Opposition Result	Opposition Result	Opposition Result	Rank
Paddy Barnes	Light flyweight	Bye	Meza (ECU); W 14–8	Maszczyk (POL); W 11–5	Zou (CHN); L 0–15	Did not advance	3rd place, bronze medalist(s)
John Joe Nevin	Bantamweight	Ourradi (ALG); W 9–4	Badar-Uugan (MGL); L 2–9	Did not advance			
John Joe Joyce	Light welterweight	Káté (HUN); W 9–5	Díaz (DOM); L 11–11^{+}	Did not advance			
Darren Sutherland	Middleweight	Bye	Kassel (ALG); W RSC	Blanco (VEN); W 11–1	DeGale (GBR); L 3–10	Did not advance	3rd place, bronze medalist(s)
Kenny Egan	Light heavyweight	Jackson (ISV); W 22–2	Muzaffer (TUR); W 10–2	Silva (BRA); W 8–0	Jeffries (GBR); W 10–3	Zhang Xp (CHN); L 7–11	2nd place, silver medalist(s)

== Canoeing ==
Ireland qualified one competitor in slalom canoeing. Eoin Rheinisch qualified an Irish boat in slalom kayak event after finishing seventeenth in the 2007 World Championships. Ireland did not have any competitors in the flatwater events.

=== Slalom ===
Athlete	Event	Preliminary						Semifinal		Final			
Athlete	Event	Run 1	Rank	Run 2	Rank	Total	Rank	Time	Rank	Time	Rank	Total	Rank
Eoin Rheinisch	Men's K-1	88.52	18	87.81	12	176.33	15 Q	88.85	10 Q	88.06	4	176.91	4

== Cycling ==
Ireland qualified two places for the road race based on UCI rankings. Robin Seymour qualified for his third men's cross country race in the mountain biking. On 18 June 2008, the Olympic Council of Ireland announced that David O'Loughlin had secured a place for the men's individual pursuit in track cycling. Initially, the UCI released a list of qualifiers which did not include O'Loughlin.

=== Road ===
Athlete	Event	Time	Rank
Philip Deignan	Men's road race	6:39:42	81
Nicolas Roche	Men's road race	6:34:26	64

=== Track ===
Pursuit

Athlete	Event	Qualification		Semifinals		Finals	
Athlete	Event	Time	Rank	Opponent Results	Rank	Opponent Results	Rank
David O'Loughlin	Men's individual pursuit	4:26.102	11	Did not advance			

=== Mountain biking ===
Athlete	Event	Time	Rank
Robin Seymour	Men's cross-country	Did not finish	

== Equestrian ==
=== Eventing ===
Although Ireland did not qualify for the team event in the 2008 Olympics, as a result of having 5 individual riding spots qualify, they were automatically entered into the team event.

Athlete	Horse	Event	Dressage		Cross-country			Jumping						Total	
Athlete	Horse	Event	Dressage		Cross-country			Qualifier			Final			Total	
Athlete	Horse	Event	Penalties	Rank	Penalties	Total	Rank	Penalties	Total	Rank	Penalties	Total	Rank	Penalties	Rank
Geoffrey Curran	Kilkishen	Individual	61.70 #	59	30.40	92.10	39	2.00	94.10	33	Did not advance			94.10	32
Niall Griffin	Lorgaine	Individual	50.60	35	46.40	97.00 #	41	12.00	109.00 #	39	Did not advance			109.00	38
Louise Lyons	Watership Down	Individual	57.40	55	28.40	85.80	35	9.00	94.80	34	Did not advance			94.80	33
Austin O'Connor	Hobby Du Mee	Individual	52.80	42	34.40	87.20	36	0.00	87.20	27 Q	0.00	87.20	21	87.20	21
Patricia Ryan	Fernhill Clover Mist	Individual	78.70 #	68	34.80	113.50 #	47	13.00	126.50 #	44	Did not advance			126.50	43
Geoffrey Curran; Niall Griffin; Louise Lyons; Austin O'Connor; Patricia Ryan	See above	Team	160.80	10	104.30	265.10	8	11.00	276.10	8	—N/a			276.10	8

# – Indicates that points do not count in team total

=== Show jumping ===
As a result of Jessica Kürten's world ranking, Ireland earned one individual place in show jumping at the 2008 games. As Kürten opted not to ride in the Olympics, the place was awarded to Denis Lynch.

Lynch and his mount Lantinus progressed to the finals stage. However, along with riders and horses from four other finalists, Lynch was suspended from taking part in the final, following a positive test for a banned substance.

Athlete	Horse	Event	Qualification								Final					Total	
Athlete	Horse	Event	Round 1		Round 2			Round 3			Round A		Round B			Total	
Athlete	Horse	Event	Penalties	Rank	Penalties	Total	Rank	Penalties	Total	Rank	Penalties	Rank	Penalties	Total	Rank	Penalties	Rank
Denis Lynch	Lantinus	Individual	1	=14	1	2	4 Q	6	8	8 Q	Withdrew						

== Fencing ==
Ireland qualified one berth in sabre fencing. Siobhan Byrne secured her place in the Olympics by winning silver at the qualifying tournament in Istanbul in April.

Women

Athlete	Event	Round of 64	Round of 32	Round of 16	Quarterfinal	Semifinal	Final / BM	
Athlete	Event	Opposition Score	Opposition Score	Opposition Score	Opposition Score	Opposition Score	Opposition Score	Rank
Siobhan Byrne	Individual sabre	Więckowska (POL); L 8–15	Did not advance					

== Rowing ==
Ireland qualified with two boats for the rowing events. The men's coxless four qualified for the Olympics by finishing tenth at the 2007 World Championships. The men's lightweight coxless four team also granted their berth by finishing second at the last Olympic qualifying regatta in Poznań in June 2008 to complete the team line-up.

Men

Athlete	Event	Heats		Repechage		Semifinals		Final	
Athlete	Event	Time	Rank	Time	Rank	Time	Rank	Time	Rank
Sean Casey; Jonno Devlin; Cormac Folan; Sean O'Neill	Four	6:02.85	3 SA/B	Bye		5:58.14	6 FB	6:07.97	10
Richard Archibald; Paul Griffin; Cathal Moynihan; Gearoid Towey*	Lightweight four	5:52.32	4 R	6:21.81	1 SA/B	6:13.85	4 FB	6:06.02	10

Qualification Legend: FA=Final A (medal); FB=Final B (non-medal); FC=Final C (non-medal); FD=Final D (non-medal); FE=Final E (non-medal); FF=Final F (non-medal); SA/B=Semifinals A/B; SC/D=Semifinals C/D; SE/F=Semifinals E/F; QF=Quarterfinals; R=Repechage

* In the non-medal final, Gearoid Towey had to withdraw due to illness, and was replaced by substitute Richard Coakley. (A spate of illness circulated in the regatta field during the heats and finals, to the extent Germany's lightweight men's four had to withdraw entirely from the semifinal after three crew-members were affected.)

== Sailing ==
Men

Athlete	Event	Race											Net points	Final rank
Athlete	Event	1	2	3	4	5	6	7	8	9	10	M*	Net points	Final rank
Philip Lawton; Gerald Owens	470	22	1	17	15	1	~~25~~	21	15	13	24	EL	129	16
Stephen Milne; Peter O'Leary	Star	6	12	7	10	12	~~13~~	13	8	11	12	EL	91	13

Women

Athlete	Event	Race											Net points	Final rank
Athlete	Event	1	2	3	4	5	6	7	8	9	10	M*	Net points	Final rank
Ciara Peelo	Laser Radial	23	17	15	7	13	24	~~25~~	18	10	CAN	EL	127	23

Open

Athlete	Event	Race											Net points	Final rank
Athlete	Event	1	2	3	4	5	6	7	8	9	10	M*	Net points	Final rank
Tim Goodbody	Finn	~~22~~	13	15	15	17	16	21	15	CAN	CAN	EL	112	21

M = Medal race; EL = Eliminated – did not advance into the medal race; CAN = Race cancelled

== Shooting ==
Men

Athlete	Event	Qualification		Final	
Athlete	Event	Points	Rank	Points	Rank
Derek Burnett	Trap	110	29	Did not advance	

== Swimming ==
Men

Athlete	Event	Heat		Semifinal		Final	
Athlete	Event	Time	Rank	Time	Rank	Time	Rank
Andrew Bree	100 m breaststroke	1:01.76 NR	30	Did not advance			
Andrew Bree	200 m breaststroke	2:10.91 NR	12 Q	2:10.16 NR	11	Did not advance	
Andrew Bree	200 m individual medley	DNS		Did not advance			

Women

Athlete	Event	Heat		Semifinal		Final	
Athlete	Event	Time	Rank	Time	Rank	Time	Rank
Aisling Cooney	100 m backstroke	1:02.50	31	Did not advance			
Melanie Nocher	200 m freestyle	2:04.29	43	Did not advance			
Melanie Nocher	200 m backstroke	2:12.29 NR	20	Did not advance			

Qualifiers for the latter rounds of all events are decided on a time only basis, therefore positions shown are overall results versus competitors in all heats. There was controversy during the selection of Irish Athletes, when an Irish man from Derry named Patthew Movey qualified, but the Irish Olympic committee forbid him from competing. Citing potential embarrassment

== Triathlon ==
Emma Davis represented Ireland in the women's triathlon at the 2008 Beijing Olympic Games, becoming Ireland's first ever Olympic triathlete.

Athlete	Event	Swim (1.5 km)	Trans 1	Bike (40 km)	Trans 2	Run (10 km)	Total Time	Rank
Emma Davis	Women's	20:17	0:32	1:06:03	0:28	39:09	2:06:29.36	37

== See also ==
- Ireland at the 2008 Summer Paralympics
