= Equestrian events at the 2008 Summer Olympics =

Equestrian at the Games of the XXIX Olympiad
- Pictogram for equestrian at the 2008 Olympic Games
- Venue: Hong Kong Sports Institute
- Dates: 9–21 August 2008
- Competitors: 193 from 42 nations

Equestrian competitions in all three disciplines at the Beijing 2008 Summer Olympics were held from 9 August to 21 August at the Hong Kong Sports Institute and Sheung Yue River in Hong Kong. It was the second time that the equestrian events were hosted by a member of the IOC other than the member hosting the main games (although this time the events were technically held in the same country as the main games). Unlike 1956, however, the equestrian events were part of the main games, and were held within the same period.

== Events ==
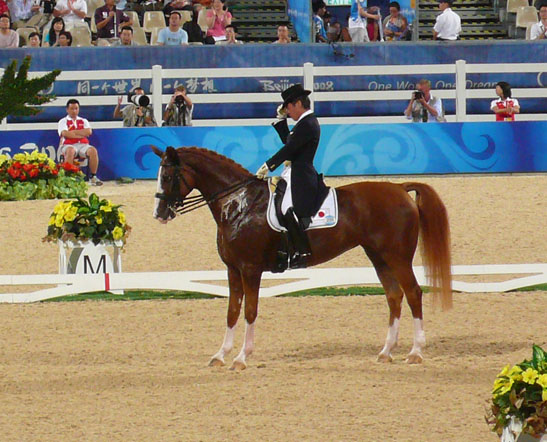
A Japanese competitor in dressage at the Games

6 sets of medals were awarded in the following events:

- individual dressage
- team dressage
- individual jumping
- team jumping
- individual eventing
- team eventing

== Qualification ==
Each event has its own qualification rules, but generally rely on FEI rankings.

=== Dressage qualification ===
For the team competition there were a total of 10 quota spots and as many composite as qualify. Three team spots were awarded at the 2006 FEI World Equestrian Games. In addition 7 team spots were awarded at regional competitions (Europe: 3, Americas: 2, Asia: 2). In addition, should a country have three athletes qualified in the individual competition, they will be considered a team and allowed to compete as a composite team. Five teams qualified under this scheme.

For the individual competition, 50 spots were allocated as follows. Thirty spots were awarded to the athletes who qualified as teams above. In addition, the highest ranked rider from each of seven geographic regions and the host nation qualify. Then the top twelve riders based on rank FEI rank who had not otherwise qualified are given spots.

=== Jumping qualification ===
A country may send up to five riders if it qualified for the team competition, two otherwise. Similar to Dressage, teams of five riders were qualified at either the World Equestrian Games, a region competition, or through a composite spot. The WEG awarded five spots, the regions eight (Americas: 2, Europe: 2, Asia: 4), and two composite teams qualified. For the individual competition there were a total of 73 spot allocated as follows: 45 team member, 1 host nation, 7 regional, and 22 at-large.

== Officials ==
Appointment of officials was as follows:

Dressage

- (Germany) Gotthilf Riexinger (Ground Jury President)
- (France) Jean-Michel Roudier (Ground Jury Member)
- (Netherlands) Ghislain Fouarge (Ground Jury Member)
- (Denmark) Leif Törnblad (Ground Jury Member)
- (United States) Gary Rockwell (Ground Jury Member)
- (Japan) Minako Furuoka-Hashimoto (Ground Jury Member)
- (Hungary) Barnabas Mandi (Ground Jury Member)
- (Belgium) Mariëtte Withages (Technical Delegate)

Jumping

- (Netherlands) Rogier van Iersel (Ground Jury President)
- (United States) David M. Distler (Ground Jury Member)
- (France) Jean-Loup Caplain (Ground Jury Member)
- (South Korea) Won-Oh Park (Ground Jury Member)
- (Germany) Olaf Petersen (Technical Delegate)

Eventing

- (Germany) Martin Plewa (Ground Jury President)
- (United States) Marilyn Payne (Ground Jury Member)
- (Switzerland) Christian Landolt (Ground Jury Member)
- (Italy) Giuseppe Della Chiesa (Technical Delegate)
- (United Kingdom) Andrew Griffiths (Technical Delegate Assistant)

== Competition schedule ==
All times are Hong Kong Time (UTC+8).

Date	Start	Finish	Event	Stage
Saturday, 9 August 2008	06:30	10:30	Eventing Team	Dressage (Day 1)
Saturday, 9 August 2008	06:30	10:30	Eventing Individual	Dressage (Day 1)
Saturday, 9 August 2008	19:15	23:15	Eventing Team	Dressage (Day 1)
Saturday, 9 August 2008	19:15	23:15	Eventing Individual	Dressage (Day 1)
Sunday, 10 August 2008	06:30	10:30	Eventing Team	Dressage (Day 2)
Sunday, 10 August 2008	06:30	10:30	Eventing Individual	Dressage (Day 2)
Monday, 11 August 2008	08:00	11:30	Eventing Team	Cross Country (held at Beas River)
Monday, 11 August 2008	08:00	11:30	Eventing Individual	Cross Country (held at Beas River)
Tuesday, 12 August 2008	19:15	22:15	Eventing Team	Jumping (Final)
Tuesday, 12 August 2008	19:15	22:15	Eventing Individual	Jumping (Qualifier)
Tuesday, 12 August 2008	22:30	23:30	Eventing Individual	Jumping (Final)
Wednesday, 13 August 2008	19:15	24:15	Dressage Team	Grand Prix (Day 1)
Wednesday, 13 August 2008	19:15	24:15	Dressage Individual	Grand Prix 1st Qualifier (Day 1)
Thursday, 14 August 2008	19:15	23:45	Dressage Individual	Grand Prix 1st Qualifier (Day 2)
Thursday, 14 August 2008	19:15	23:45	Dressage Team	Grand Prix (Day 2)
Friday, 15 August 2008	19:15	23:15	Jumping Individual	1st Qualifier
Saturday, 16 August 2008	19:15	24:00	Dressage Individual	Grand Prix Special 2nd Qualifier
Sunday, 17 August 2008	19:15	23:15	Jumping Team	Final Round 1
Sunday, 17 August 2008	19:15	23:15	Jumping Individual	2nd Qualifier
Monday, 18 August 2008	19:15	22:15	Jumping Team	Final Round 2
Monday, 18 August 2008	19:15	22:15	Jumping Individual	3rd Qualifier
Tuesday, 19 August 2008	19:15	22:15	Dressage Individual	Grand Prix Freestyle
Thursday, 21 August 2008	19:15	21:45	Jumping Individual	Final Round A
Thursday, 21 August 2008	22:00	23:00	Jumping Individual	Final Round B

== Medal summary ==
=== Medal table ===
Rank	Nation	Gold	Silver	Bronze	Total
1	Germany	3	1	1	5
2	United States	1	1	1	3
3	Canada	1	1	0	2
3	Netherlands	1	1	0	2
5	Australia	0	1	0	1
5	Sweden	0	1	0	1
7	Great Britain	0	0	2	2
8	Denmark	0	0	1	1
8	Switzerland	0	0	1	1
Totals (9 entries)		6	6	6	18

=== Medalists ===
Games	Gold	Silver	Bronze
Individual dressage	Anky van Grunsven on Salinero; Netherlands	Isabell Werth on Satchmo; Germany	Heike Kemmer on Bonaparte; Germany
Team dressage	Germany; Heike Kemmer on Bonaparte; Nadine Capellmann on Elvis Va; Isabell Werth on Satchmo	Netherlands; Hans Peter Minderhoud on Nadine; Imke Schellekens-Bartels on Sunrise; Anky van Grunsven on Salinero	Denmark; Anne van Olst on Clearwater; Nathalie zu Sayn-Wittgenstein on Digby; Andreas Helgstrand on Don Schufro
Individual eventing	Hinrich Romeike on Marius; Germany	Gina Miles on McKinlaigh; United States	Kristina Cook on Miners Frolic; Great Britain
Team eventing	Germany; Peter Thomsen on The Ghost of Hamish; Frank Ostholt on Mr. Medicott; Andreas Dibowski on Butts Leon; Ingrid Klimke on Abraxxas; Hinrich Romeike on Marius	Australia; Shane Rose on All Luck; Sonja Johnson on Ringwould Jaguar; Lucinda Fredericks on Headley Britannia; Clayton Fredericks on Ben Along Time; Megan Jones on Irish Jester	Great Britain; Sharon Hunt on Tankers Town; Daisy Dick on Spring Along; William Fox-Pitt on Parkmore Ed; Kristina Cook on Miners Frolic; Mary King on Call Again Cavalier
Individual jumping	Eric Lamaze on Hickstead; Canada	Rolf-Göran Bengtsson on Ninja; Sweden	Beezie Madden on Authentic; United States
Team jumping	United States; McLain Ward on Sapphire; Laura Kraut on Cedric; Will Simpson on Carlsson vom Dach; Beezie Madden on Authentic	Canada; Jill Henselwood on Special Ed; Eric Lamaze on Hickstead; Ian Millar on In Style; Mac Cone on Ole	Switzerland; Christina Liebherr on No Mercy; Pius Schwizer on Nobless M Niklaus Schurtenberger on Cantus; Steve Guerdat on Jalisca Solier

== Venue ==
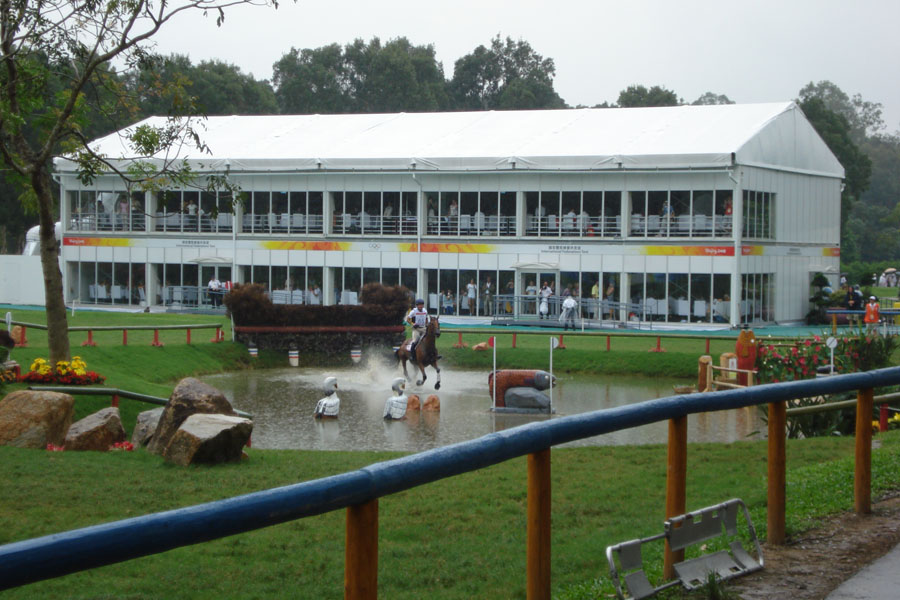
A spectator area and water jump in the eventing portion of the Games

The equestrian competitions were held apart from the main games in Hong Kong, which is a separate member to the IOC. This was because Hong Kong has established a huge horse racing industry since its British colonial days; therefore, strict quarantine measures for horses have been well established in the region, and were likely to result in fewer problems with equine disease than other cities in mainland China. Additionally, there were already some stabling sites for horses within Hong Kong, hence less construction was needed to facilitate the equestrian sports required by the Olympics.

There were two main equestrian venues: Hong Kong Sports Institute (adjacent to Sha Tin Racecourse) and the Beas River Country Club. The Sports Institute held the main competition arena, which included an 80 × 100 meter stadium will all-weather footing and seating for 18,000. The Beas River Country Club was the site of the cross-country phase of eventing, which was held on the golf course.

== Weather ==
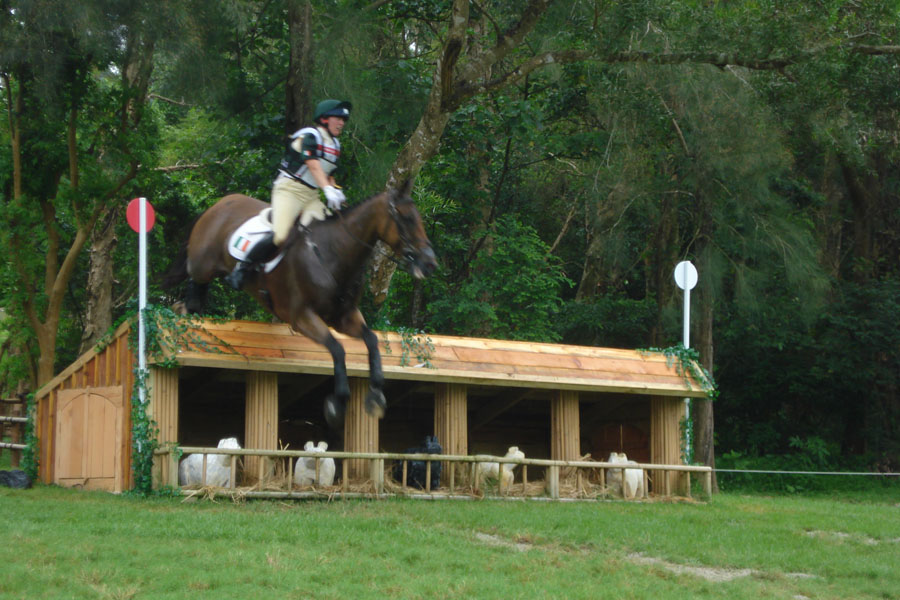
An Irish competitor in eventing at the Games

Hong Kong is known to have hot and humid weather with typhoons being common. This includes a mean air temperature of 28.4 °C (83.1 °F) with 82% humidity, making it even more inclement than Athens (mean temperature of 27.6 °C (81.6 °F), humidity 48%) and Atlanta (26 °C (78 °F), 75% humidity).

Some competitors made it clear that they believed that it would be unfair to work their horses in such weather. Swiss dressage rider Sylvia Ikle was one such rider, and the Swiss decided not to send a dressage team because they would have had little chance of success without her.

To combat the heat, the horses were transported from the airport in Hong Kong to the stabling facilities in air-conditioned vans. The stables are all air-conditioned as well, at a temperature of 20 °C (68 °F). For the first time in history, there was also an indoor arena for training that was also air-conditioned. Misting fans were placed under tents at both venues to cool off horses that worked outside. There were also vast quantities of ice water available. There was a veterinary clinic on site, which tested the horses' urine several times to ensure they were all properly hydrated.

The cross-country course was also designed with a shorter, alternate route to be used if the heat and humidity warranted it. The show jumping was held under lights at night to avoid the heat. The footing is made of high tensile fibers and quartz sand, which has a great ability to absorb water, so that any rain should have minimal effect on the footing used for dressage and show jumping competitions.

== Courses ==
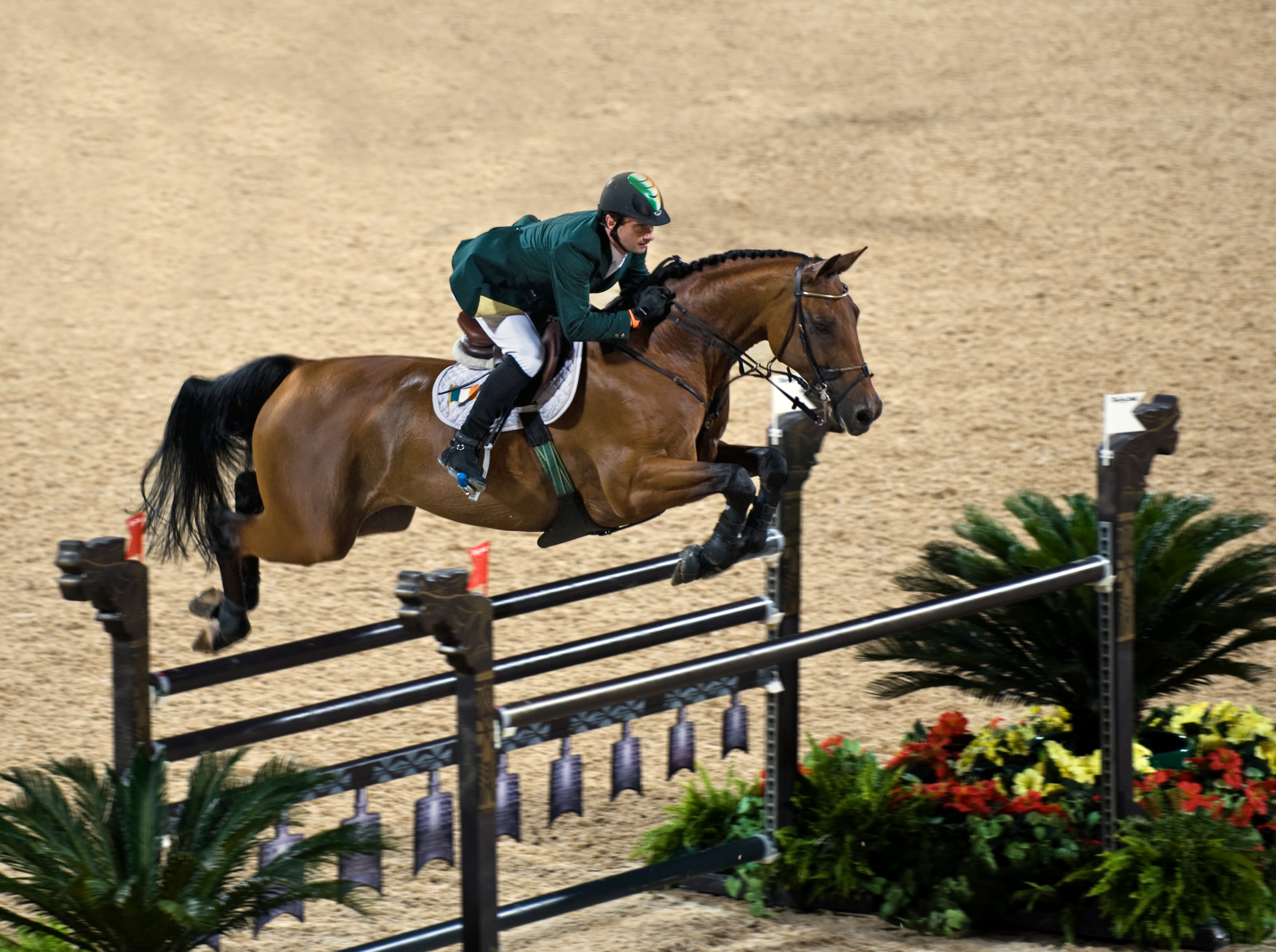
Denis Lynch and Latinus in show jumping

The show jumping courses (both Grand Prix and the eventing stadium phase) were designed by Leopoldo Palacios of Venezuela and Steve Stephens of the USA. Michael Etherington-Smith of Great Britain designed the cross-country course.

== Participation ==
More than 200 horses from 41 nations competed.

- Dressage: 13 teams of 3 riders each, and 10 individuals.
- Eventing: 5 riders per team, with only 3 scores counting.

== See also ==
- Equestrian at the 2008 Summer Paralympics
