= Hinrich Romeike =

German equestrian

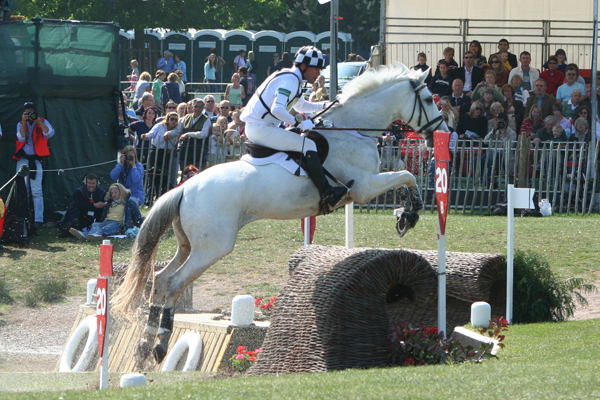

Medal record

Representing Germany

Equestrian

Olympic Games
Gold medal – first place	2008 Beijing	Individual eventing
Gold medal – first place	2008 Beijing	Team eventing

World Championships
Gold medal – first place	2006 Aachen	Team eventing

European Championships
Bronze medal – third place	2005 Blenheim	Team eventing

Hinrich Romeike (born 26 May 1963 in Hamburg) is a German eventing rider. With his horse Marius he won gold medals in individual eventing and team eventing together with Ingrid Klimke, Andreas Dibowski, Peter Thomsen and Frank Ostholt at the 2008 Summer Olympics.

== Biography ==
He already won with the team at the 2006 FEI World Equestrian Games in Aachen, Germany. At the 2004 Summer Olympics he made the 4th place in team eventing and the 5th place in individual eventing.

He came out in first place after a stellar performance in the Cross-Country phase, and maintained his position with fast, clear jumping rounds, and took home the Olympic gold medal in both Team and Individual Eventing for Germany.

Alongside eventing and winning two Olympic gold medals, Hinrich is working as a dentist full-time in Rendsburg. He lives with his wife and three children in Nübbel, Schleswig-Holstein, Germany. Hinrich being tracked by the BBC as part of their series World Olympic Dreams, which follows him in the run-up to London 2012.
