= Equestrian at the 2008 Summer Olympics – Team eventing =

Team eventing at the Games of the XXIX Olympiad
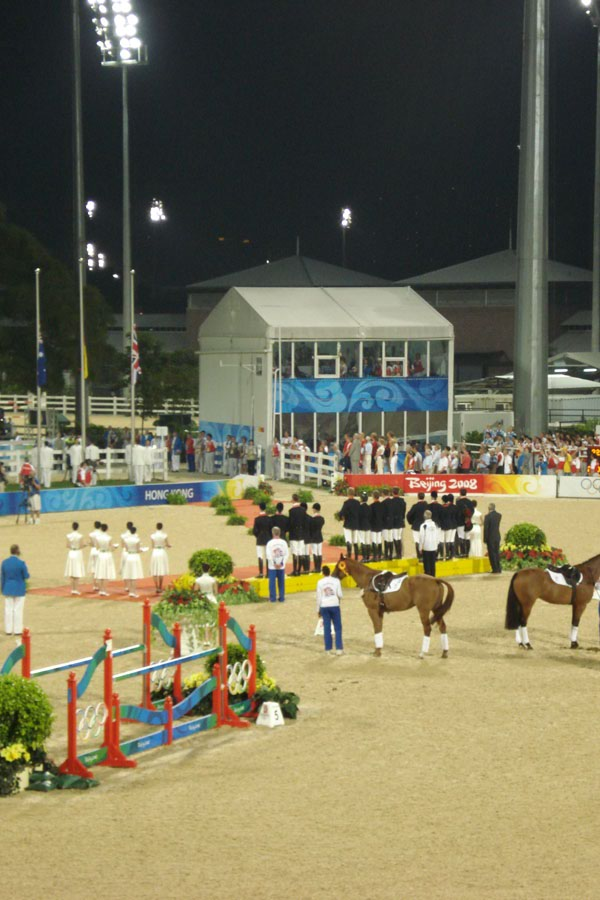
- Medal ceremony
- Venue: Hong Kong Sports Institute
- Date: 9–12 August

Medalists
1st place, gold medalist(s)		Andreas Dibowski; Ingrid Klimke; Frank Ostholt; Hinrich Romeike; Peter Thomsen	Germany
2nd place, silver medalist(s)		Clayton Fredericks; Lucinda Fredericks; Sonja Johnson; Megan Jones; Shane Rose	Australia
3rd place, bronze medalist(s)		Kristina Cook; Daisy Dick; William Fox-Pitt; Sharon Hunt; Mary King	Great Britain

The team eventing at the 2008 Summer Olympics took place between August 9 and 12 at the Hong Kong Sports Institute.

Team eventing consisted of three phases: dressage, cross-country, and show-jumping. Scores from each phase were converted into penalty points, which were summed to give a score. Teams of up to five horse and rider pairs competed; The team with the lowest total of penalty points, after adding together the Final scores of its three best riders will be the winner.

In the dressage portion, the pair performed in front of three judges. The judges gave marks of between 0 and 10 for each of ten required elements; the scores for the judges were averaged to give a score between 0 and 100. That score was then subtracted from 100 and multiplied by 1.5 to give the number of penalty points.

The cross-county portion consisted of a 4.56 kilometer course with 29 obstacles. The target time was eight minutes; pairs received .4 penalty points for every second above that time. They also received 20 penalty points for every obstacle not cleanly jumped.

The final phase was the show-jumping; pairs had to negotiate a course of obstacles. The pair received 4 penalty points for each obstacle where there was a refusal or a knockdown of the obstacle. One penalty point was also assessed for each second taken above the maximum time for the course.

The results of the team phase were also used in the individual eventing event, though that event added a second jumping phase as a final.

== Medalists ==
Gold:		Silver:		Bronze:	
Germany		Australia		Great Britain	
Andreas Dibowski	Butts Leon	Clayton Fredericks	Ben Along Time	Kristina Cook	Miners Frolic
Ingrid Klimke	Butts Abraxxas	Lucinda Fredericks	Headley Britannia	Daisy Dick	Spring Along
Frank Ostholt	Mr. Medicott	Sonja Johnson	Ringwould Jaguar	William Fox-Pitt	Parkmore Ed
Hinrich Romeike	Marius	Megan Jones	Irish Jester	Sharon Hunt	Tankers Town
Peter Thomsen	The Ghost of Hamish	Shane Rose	All Luck	Mary King	Call Again Cavalier

== Results ==
=== Standings after dressage ===
Nation	Individual results			Team Penalties	Team Rank
Nation	Rider	Horse	Penalties	Team Penalties	Team Rank
Australia	Clayton Fredericks	Ben Along Time	37.00	102.80	1
Australia	Lucinda Fredericks	Headley Britannia	30.40	102.80	1
Australia	Megan Jones	Irish Jester	35.40	102.80	1
Australia	Sonja Johnson	Ringwould Jaguar	45.20	102.80	1
Australia	Shane Rose	All Luck	53.30	102.80	1
Germany	Peter Thomsen	The Ghost Of Hamish	53.30	110.50	2
Germany	Frank Ostholt	Mr. Medicott	44.60	110.50	2
Germany	Hinrich Romeike	Marius	37.40	110.50	2
Germany	Ingrid Klimke	Butts Abraxxas	33.50	110.50	2
Germany	Andreas Dibowski	Butts Leon	39.60	110.50	2
United States	Amy Tryon	Poggio II	46.50	115.60	3
United States	Gina Miles	Mckinlaigh	39.30	115.60	3
United States	Rebecca Holder	Courageous Comet	35.70	115.60	3
United States	Karen O'Connor	Mandiba	41.90	115.60	3
United States	Phillip Dutton	Connaught	40.60	115.60	3
Great Britain	Daisy Dick	Spring Along	51.70	121.80	4
Great Britain	William Fox-Pitt	Parkmore Ed	50.20	121.80	4
Great Britain	Kristina Cook	Miners Frolic	40.20	121.80	4
Great Britain	Sharon Hunt	Tankers Town	43.50	121.80	4
Great Britain	Mary King	Call Again Cavalier	38.10	121.80	4
Italy	Vittoria Panizzon	Rock Model	50.60	127.40	5
Italy	Stefano Brecciaroli	Cappa Hill	50.00	127.40	5
Italy	Fabio Magni	Southern King V	49.60	127.40	5
Italy	Susanna Bordone	Ava	37.80	127.40	5
Italy	Roberto Rotatori	Irham De Viages	40.00	127.40	5
New Zealand	Mark Todd	Gandalf	49.40	136.50	6
New Zealand	Heelan Tompkins	Sugoi	55.60	136.50	6
New Zealand	Andrew Nicholson	Lord Killinghurst	44.60	136.50	6
New Zealand	Joe Meyer	Snip	43.90	136.50	6
New Zealand	Caroline Powell	Lenamore	48.00	136.50	6
Sweden	Katrin Norling	Pandora	52.00	140.00	7
Sweden	Linda Algotsson	Stand By Me	41.50	140.00	7
Sweden	Viktoria Carlerbäck	Bally's Geronimo	46.50	140.00	7
Sweden	Magnus Gällerdal	Keymaster	54.60	140.00	7
Sweden	Dag Albert	Tubber Rebel	65.60	140.00	7
France	Didier Dhennin	Ismene Du Temple	42.80	152.70	8
France	Nicolas Touzaint	Galan De Sauvagere	1000.00	152.70	8
France	Eric Vigeanel	Coronado Prior	53.00	152.70	8
France	Jean Renaud Adde	Haston D'Elpegere	56.90	152.70	8
Canada	Kyle Carter	Madison Park	63.50	153.20	9
Canada	Sandra Donnelly	Buenos Aires	60.20	153.20	9
Canada	Selena O'Hanlon	Colombo	44.10	153.20	9
Canada	Samantha Taylor	Livewire	70.70	153.20	9
Canada	Mike Winter	King Pin	48.90	153.20	9
Ireland	Austin O'Connor	Hobby Du Mee	52.80	160.80	10
Ireland	Geoffrey Curran	Kilkishen	61.70	160.80	10
Ireland	Louise Lyons	Watership Down	57.40	160.80	10
Ireland	Patricia Ryan	Fernhill Clover Mist	78.70	160.80	10
Ireland	Niall Griffin	Lorgaine	50.60	160.80	10
Brazil	Marcelo Tosi	Super Rocky	64.80	180.30	11
Brazil	Jeferson Moreira	Escudiero	55.90	180.30	11
Brazil	Saulo Tristão	Totsie	79.60	180.30	11
Brazil	André Paro	Land Heir	59.60	180.30	11

Note: The team penalties given above are for the top three in each team at this stage and may not tally with the final total scores. The final results are determined by adding the total scores of the top three team members at the end of the competition.

=== Standings after Dressage and Cross Country ===
Nation	Individual results				Total Team Penalties	Team Rank
Nation	Rider	Horse	Cross Country Penalties	Total Penalties	Total Team Penalties	Team Rank
Germany	Peter Thomsen	The Ghost Of Hamish	25.60	98.90	158.10	1
Germany	Frank Ostholt	Mr. Medicott	13.20	57.80	158.10	1
Germany	Hinrich Romeike	Marius	12.80	50.20	158.10	1
Germany	Ingrid Klimke	Butts Abraxxas	17.20	50.70	158.10	1
Germany	Andreas Dibowski	Butts Leon	17.60	57.20	158.10	1
Australia	Clayton Fredericks	Ben Along Time	16.40	53.40	162.00	2
Australia	Lucinda Fredericks	Headley Britannia	27.20	57.60	162.00	2
Australia	Megan Jones	Irish Jester	15.60	51.00	162.00	2
Australia	Sonja Johnson	Ringwould Jaguar	13.60	58.80	162.00	2
Australia	Shane Rose	All Luck	9.20	62.50	162.00	2
Great Britain	Daisy Dick	Spring Along	17.20	68.90	173.70	3
Great Britain	William Fox-Pitt	Parkmore Ed	10.00	60.20	173.70	3
Great Britain	Kristina Cook	Miners Frolic	17.20	57.40	173.70	3
Great Britain	Sharon Hunt	Tankers Town	27.60	91.10	173.70	3
Great Britain	Mary King	Call Again Cavalier	18.00	56.10	173.70	3
Italy	Vittoria Panizzon	Rock Model	18.40	69.00	198.40	4
Italy	Stefano Brecciaroli	Cappa Hill	42.00	112.00	198.40	4
Italy	Fabio Magni	Southern King V	50.00	119.60	198.40	4
Italy	Susanna Bordone	Ava	28.80	66.60	198.40	4
Italy	Roberto Rotatori	Irham De Viages	22.80	62.80	198.40	4
Sweden	Katrin Norling	Pandora	16.00	68.00	200.50	5
Sweden	Linda Algotsson	Stand By Me	22.80	64.30	200.50	5
Sweden	Viktoria Carlerbäck	Bally's Geronimo	26.40	72.90	200.50	5
Sweden	Magnus Gällerdal	Keymaster	13.60	68.20	200.50	5
Sweden	Dag Albert	Tubber Rebel	27.60	93.20 #	200.50	5
New Zealand	Mark Todd	Gandalf	27.20	76.60	210.90	6
New Zealand	Heelan Tompkins	Sugoi	35.20	130.80	210.90	6
New Zealand	Andrew Nicholson	Lord Killinghurst	Eliminated	1000.00	210.90	6
New Zealand	Joe Meyer	Snip	21.20	65.10	210.90	6
New Zealand	Caroline Powell	Lenamore	21.20	69.20	210.90	6
United States	Amy Tryon	Poggio II	Eliminated	1000.00	234.00	7
United States	Gina Miles	Mckinlaigh	16.80	56.10	234.00	7
United States	Rebecca Holder	Courageous Comet	22.00	117.70	234.00	7
United States	Karen O'Connor	Mandiba	44.80	126.70	234.00	7
United States	Phillip Dutton	Connaught	19.60	60.20	234.00	7
Ireland	Austin O'Connor	Hobby Du Mee	34.40	87.20	265.10	8
Ireland	Geoffrey Curran	Kilkishen	30.40	87.20	265.10	8
Ireland	Louise Lyons	Watership Down	28.40	85.80	265.10	8
Ireland	Patricia Ryan	Fernhill Clover Mist	34.80	113.50	265.10	8
Ireland	Niall Griffin	Lorgaine	26.40	97.00	265.10	8
Canada	Kyle Carter	Madison Park	18.40	81.90	287.00	9
Canada	Sandra Donnelly	Buenos Aires	24.00	84.20	287.00	9
Canada	Selena O'Hanlon	Colombo	36.80	120.90	287.00	9
Canada	Samantha Taylor	Livewire	69.60	180.30	287.00	9
Canada	Mike Winter	King Pin	56.80	125.70	287.00	9
Brazil	Marcelo Tosi	Super Rocky	24.80	89.60	295.10	10
Brazil	Jeferson Moreira	Escudiero	50.80	106.70	295.10	10
Brazil	Saulo Tristao	Totsie	Eliminated	1000.00	295.10	10
Brazil	Andre Paro	Land Heir	39.20	98.80	295.10	10
France	Didier Dhennin	Ismene Du Temple	14.00	56.80	1135.80	11
France	Nicolas Touzaint	Galan De Sauvagere	Withdrew	1000.00	1135.80	11
France	Eric Vigeanel	Coronado Prior	26.00	79.00	1135.80	11
France	Jean Renaud Adde	Haston D'Elpegere	Eliminated	1000.000	1135.80	11

Note: The penalty totals given for each team above are the scores of the top three team members after the Dressage and Cross-Country phases and may not tally with the overall result.

=== Final Result after Show jumping round ===
Final results below, determined by combining the three best overall scores for each team.

Nation	Individual results				Total Team Penalties	Team Rank
Nation	Rider	Horse	Show jumping Penalties	Total Penalties	Total Team Penalties	Team Rank
Germany	Peter Thomsen	The Ghost Of Hamish	4.00	102.90 #	166.10	1st place, gold medalist(s)
Germany	Frank Ostholt	Mr. Medicott	0.00	57.80 #	166.10	1st place, gold medalist(s)
Germany	Hinrich Romeike	Marius	4.00	54.20	166.10	1st place, gold medalist(s)
Germany	Ingrid Klimke	Abraxxas	4.00	54.70	166.10	1st place, gold medalist(s)
Germany	Andreas Dibowski	Butts Leon	0.00	57.20	166.10	1st place, gold medalist(s)
Australia	Clayton Fredericks	Ben Along Time	4.00	57.40	171.20	2nd place, silver medalist(s)
Australia	Lucinda Fredericks	Headley Britannia	2.00	59.60 #	171.20	2nd place, silver medalist(s)
Australia	Megan Jones	Irish Jester	4.00	55.00	171.20	2nd place, silver medalist(s)
Australia	Sonja Johnson	Ringwould Jaguar	0.00	58.80	171.20	2nd place, silver medalist(s)
Australia	Shane Rose	All Luck	8.00	70.50 #	171.20	2nd place, silver medalist(s)
Great Britain	Daisy Dick	Spring Along	11.00	79.90 #	185.70	3rd place, bronze medalist(s)
Great Britain	William Fox-Pitt	Parkmore Ed	4.00	64.20	185.70	3rd place, bronze medalist(s)
Great Britain	Kristina Cook	Miners Frolic	0.00	57.40	185.70	3rd place, bronze medalist(s)
Great Britain	Sharon Hunt	Tankers Town	4.00	95.10 #	185.70	3rd place, bronze medalist(s)
Great Britain	Mary King	Call Again Cavalier	8.00	64.10	185.70	3rd place, bronze medalist(s)
Sweden	Katrin Norling	Pandora	5.00	73.00	230.50	4
Sweden	Linda Algotsson	Stand By Me	0.00	64.30	230.50	4
Sweden	Viktoria Carlerbäck	Bally's Geronimo	Withdrew	1000.00 #	230.50	4
Sweden	Magnus Gällerdal	Keymaster	Withdrew	1000.00 #	230.50	4
Sweden	Dag Albert	Tubber Rebel	27.60	93.20	230.50	4
New Zealand	Mark Todd	Gandalf	1.00	77.60	240.90	5
New Zealand	Heelan Tompkins	Sugoi	8.00	138.80 #	240.90	5
New Zealand	Andrew Nicholson	Lord Killinghurst	Eliminated	1000.00 #	240.90	5
New Zealand	Joe Meyer	Snip	25.00	90.10	240.90	5
New Zealand	Caroline Powell	Lenamore	4.00	73.20	240.90	5
Italy	Vittoria Panizzon	Rock Model	0.00	69.00	246.40	6
Italy	Stefano Brecciaroli	Cappa Hill	4.00	116.00 #	246.40	6
Italy	Fabio Magni	Southern King V	0.00	119.60 #	246.40	6
Italy	Susanna Bordone	Ava	20.00	86.60	246.40	6
Italy	Roberto Rotatori	Irham De Viages	28.00	90.80	246.40	6
United States	Amy Tryon	Poggio II	Eliminated	1000.00 #	250.00	7
United States	Gina Miles	Mckinlaigh	0.00	56.10	250.00	7
United States	Rebecca Holder	Courageous Comet	8.00	125.70	250.00	7
United States	Karen O'Connor	Mandiba	5.00	131.70 #	250.00	7
United States	Phillip Dutton	Connaught	8.00	68.20	250.00	7
Ireland	Austin O'Connor	Hobby Du Mee	0.00	87.20	276.10	8
Ireland	Geoffrey Curran	Kilkishen	2.00	89.20	276.10	8
Ireland	Louise Lyons	Watership Down	9.00	94.80	276.10	8
Ireland	Patricia Ryan	Fernhill Clover Mist	13.00	126.50 #	276.10	8
Ireland	Niall Griffin	Lorgaine	12.00	109.00 #	276.10	8
Canada	Kyle Carter	Madison Park	14.00	95.90	321.00	9
Canada	Sandra Donnelly	Buenos Aires	8.00	92.20	321.00	9
Canada	Selena O'Hanlon	Colombo	12.00	132.90	321.00	9
Canada	Samantha Taylor	Livewire	8.00	188.30 #	321.00	9
Canada	Mike Winter	King Pin	20.00	145.70 #	321.00	9
Brazil	Marcelo Tosi	Super Rocky	0.00	89.60	334.10	10
Brazil	Jeferson Moreira	Escudiero	4.00	110.70	334.10	10
Brazil	Saulo Tristao	Totsie	Eliminated	1000.00 #	334.10	10
Brazil	Andre Paro	Land Heir	35.00	133.80	334.10	10
France	Didier Dhennin	Ismene Du Temple	3.00	59.80	1138.80	11
France	Nicolas Touzaint	Galan De Sauvagere	Withdrew	1000.00 #	1138.80	11
France	Eric Vigeanel	Coronado Prior	0.00	79.00	1138.80	11
France	Jean Renaud Adde	Haston D'Elpegere	Eliminated	1000.000	1138.80	11

# = Not counted towards team score.
