= Kristina Cook =

British three-day eventing rider

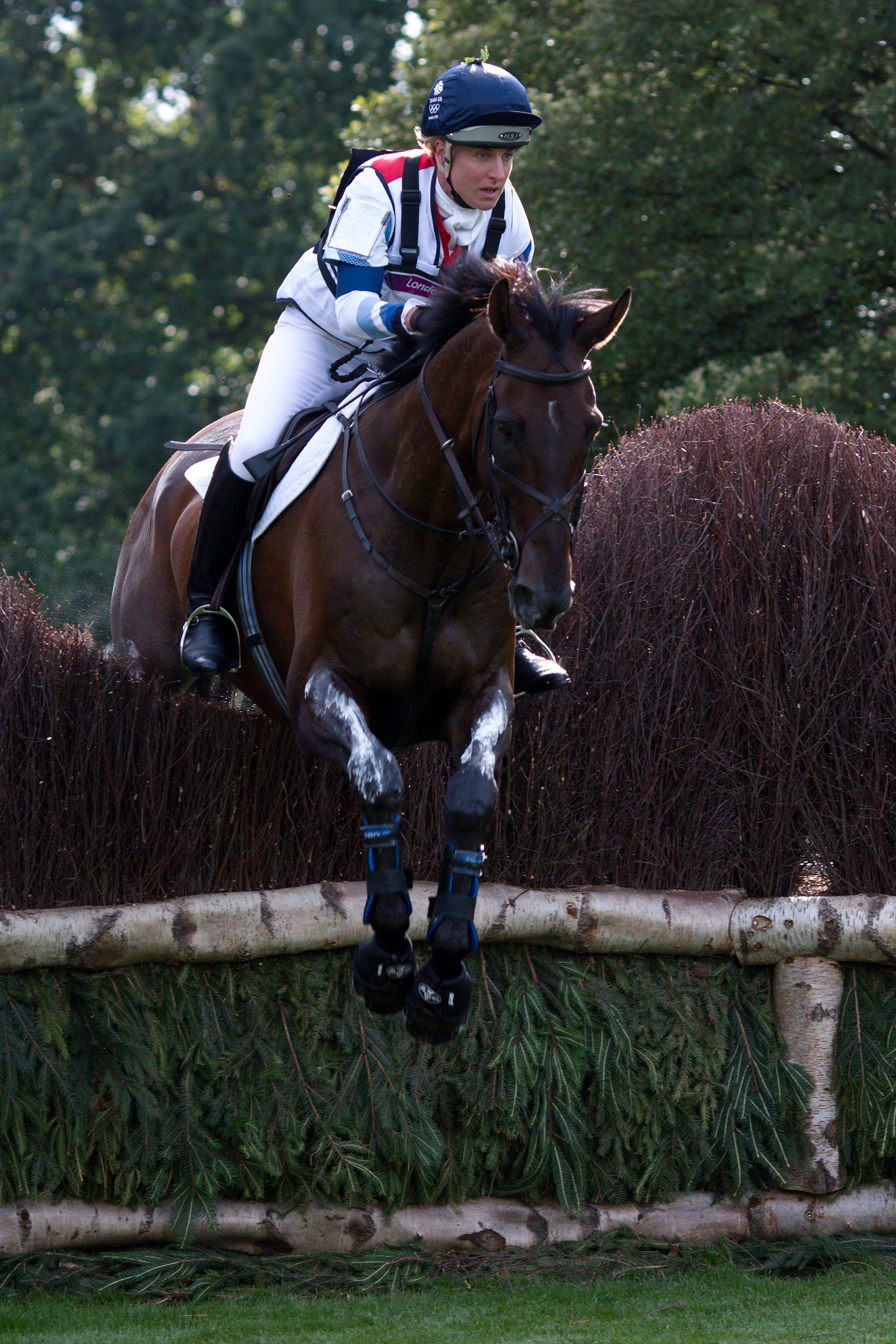
- Tina Cook and Miners Frolic competing at the 2012 Summer Olympics in London.

Personal information
- Nationality: Great Britain
- Discipline: Eventing
- Born: Findon, West Sussex, England
Medal record
Representing Great Britain
Equestrian
Olympic Games
Silver medal – second place	2012 London	Team eventing
Bronze medal – third place	2008 Beijing	Individual eventing
Bronze medal – third place	2008 Beijing	Team eventing
World Championships
Gold medal – first place	1994 The Hague	Team eventing
Gold medal – first place	2010 Kentucky	Team eventing
Silver medal – second place	2014 Normandy	Team eventing
European Championships
Gold medal – first place	1995 Pratoni del Vivaro	Team eventing
Gold medal – first place	1999 Luhmuhlen	Team eventing
Gold medal – first place	2009 Fontainebleau	Individual eventing
Gold medal – first place	2009 Fontainebleau	Team eventing
Gold medal – first place	2017 Strzegom	Team eventing
Silver medal – second place	1993 Achselschwang	Individual eventing
Silver medal – second place	2019 Luhmühlen	Team eventing
Bronze medal – third place	1997 Burghley	Individual eventing

Kristina "Tina" Cook (née Gifford, born 31 August 1970), is a British three-day eventing rider. She is the 2009 European Champion and a three-time Olympic medallist, winning individual and team bronze medals in 2008 and team silver in 2012. She has also won two World team golds (1994, 2010) and four European team golds (1995, 1999, 2009, 2017).

== Biography ==
Cook was born Kristina Gifford in Rustington and is the daughter of the four times British jump racing Champion Jockey, Josh Gifford. Riding Miners Frolic, she won bronze medals in both the individual and team eventing at the 2008 Summer Olympics in Beijing. Cook only made the Olympic Eventing team, after the withdrawals of Zara Phillips and Lucy Wiegersma. She became double European Eventing champion in 2009 on Miners Frolic in both the Individual and Team competitions at the championships at Fontainebleau in France.

Her achievements prior to the 2008 Olympics included winning individual silver medal at the European championships on Song and Dance Man in 1993, gold medals at the 1994 World Equestrian Games in The Hague and the 1995 and 1999 European Championships.

Cook won silver in the team eventing at the 2012 Summer Olympics in London. She was then picked for the team in the 2014 World Equestrian Games with her homebred horse De Novo News. This was the horse's first championship in which they helped to win team silver.

Cook is also patron for the Worthing-based charity, Guild Care.

== CCI 5* Results ==
Results
Event	Kentucky	Badminton	Luhmühlen	Burghley	Pau	Adelaide
2002		12th (Captain Christy)				
2003		12th (Captain Christy)				
2004		38th (Captain Christy)		9th (Captain Christy)		
2005		RET (Captain Christy)		12th (Captain Christy)RET (Headwind)		
2006-08	Did not participate					
2009			6th (Miners Frolic)			
2010		EL (Miners Frolic)				
2011		WD (Miners Frolic)				
2012	Did not participate					
2013		18th (Miners Frolic) 61st (De Novo News)		9th (De Novo News)		
2014		26th (De Novo News)				
2015		EL (De Novo News)		8th (Star Witness)		
2016		7th (Star Witness)		10th (Star Witness)	9th (Billy The Red)16th (Calvino II)	
2017		10th (Billy The Red)35th (Calvino II)		7th (Star Witness)17th (Calvino II)		
2018			WD (Billy The Red) WD (Star Witness)	11th (Star Witness)		
2019		7th (Billy The Red) RET (Star Witness)				
EL = Eliminated; RET = Retired; WD = Withdrew

== International Championship results ==
Results
Year	Event	Horse	Placing	Notes
2002	World Equestrian Games	Captain Christy	22nd	Individual
2003	European Championships	Captain Christy	37th	Individual
2008	Olympic Games	Miners Frolic	3rd place, bronze medalist(s)	Team
2008	Olympic Games	Miners Frolic	3rd place, bronze medalist(s)	Individual
2009	European Championships	Miners Frolic	1st place, gold medalist(s)	Team
2009	European Championships	Miners Frolic	1st place, gold medalist(s)	Individual
2010	World Equestrian Games	Miners Frolic	1st place, gold medalist(s)	Team
2010	World Equestrian Games	Miners Frolic	29th	Individual
2012	Olympic Games	Miners Frolic	2nd place, silver medalist(s)	Team
2012	Olympic Games	Miners Frolic	6th	Individual
2013	European Championships	Miners Frolic	6th	Team
2013	European Championships	Miners Frolic	13th	Individual
2014	World Young Horse Championships	Billy The Red	24th	CCI**
2014	World Equestrian Games	De Novo News	2nd place, silver medalist(s)	Team
2014	World Equestrian Games	De Novo News	15th	Individual
2017	European Championships	Billy The Red	1st place, gold medalist(s)	Team
2017	European Championships	Billy The Red	4th	Individual
2018	World Equestrian Games	Billy The Red	9th	Individual
2019	European Championships	Billy The Red	2nd place, silver medalist(s)	Team
2019	European Championships	Billy The Red	43rd	Individual
EL = Eliminated; RET = Retired; WD = Withdrew

== Notable Horses ==
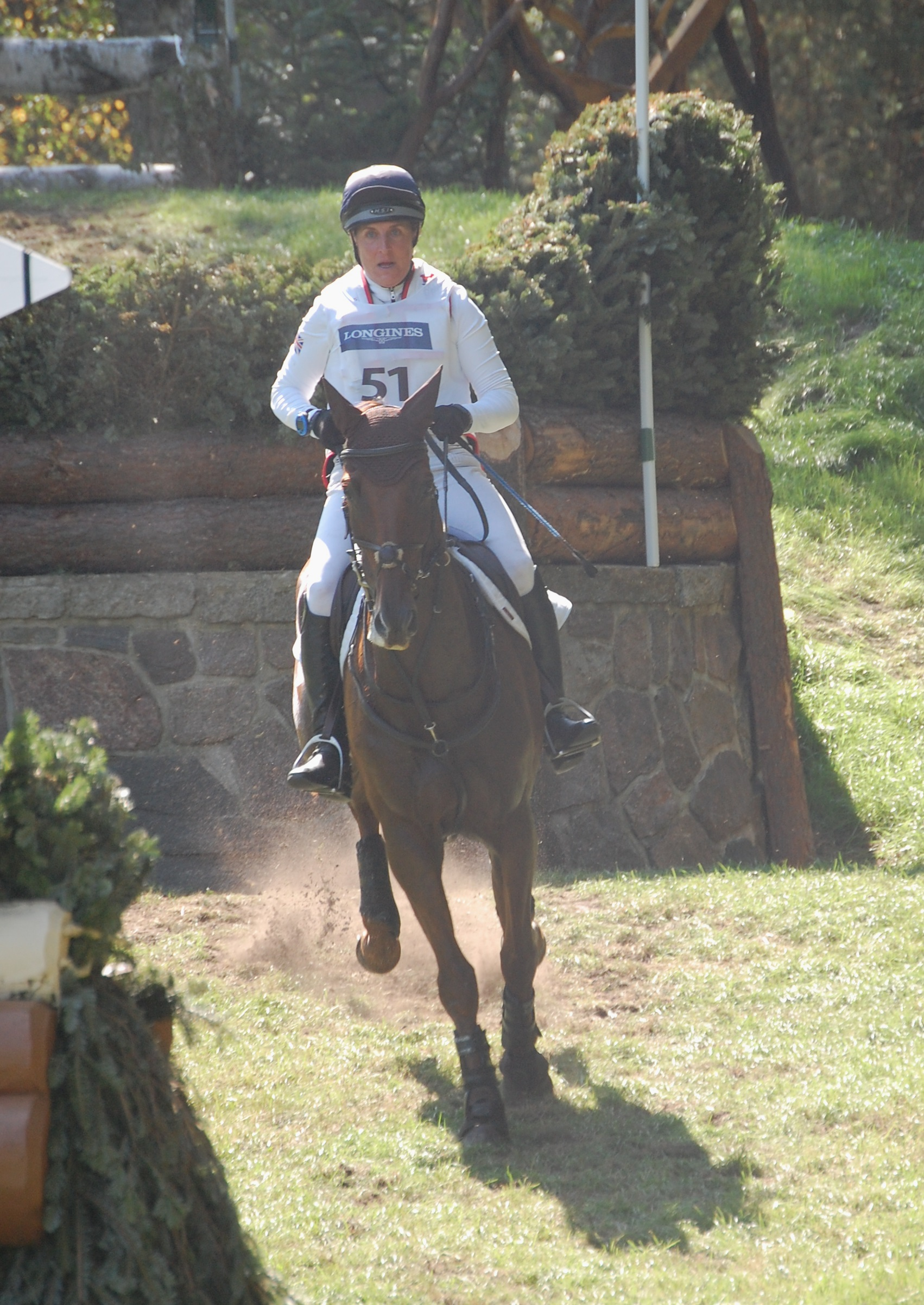
Kristina Cook and Billy the Red (2019 European Championships)

- Captain Christy – 1992 Bay Irish Sport Horse Gelding (Cavalier Royale x Imperious)
  - 2002 World Equestrian Games – Individual 22nd Place
  - 2003 European Championships – Individual 37th Place
- Miners Frolic – 1998 Dark Bay Gelding (Miners Lamp)
  - 2008 Beijing Olympics – Team Bronze Medal, Individual Bronze Medal
  - 2009 European Championships – Team Gold Medal, Individual Gold Medal
  - 2010 World Equestrian Games – Team Gold Medal, Individual 29th Place
  - 2012 London Olympics – Team Silver Medal, Individual Sixth Place
  - 2013 European Championships – Team Sixth Place, Individual 13th Place
- De Novo News – 2003 Bay Thoroughbred Stallion (Last News)
  - 2014 World Equestrian Games – Team Silver Medal, Individual 15th Place
- Billy The Red – 2007 Chestnut Baden-Wurttemberger Gelding (Lilith x Stan the Man XX)
  - 2017 European Championships – Team Gold Medal, Individual Fourth Place
