= Austin O'Connor =

Austin O'Connor may refer to:

- Austin O'Connor (equestrian)
- Austin O'Connor (wrestler)
