= Didier Dhennin =

French eventing rider

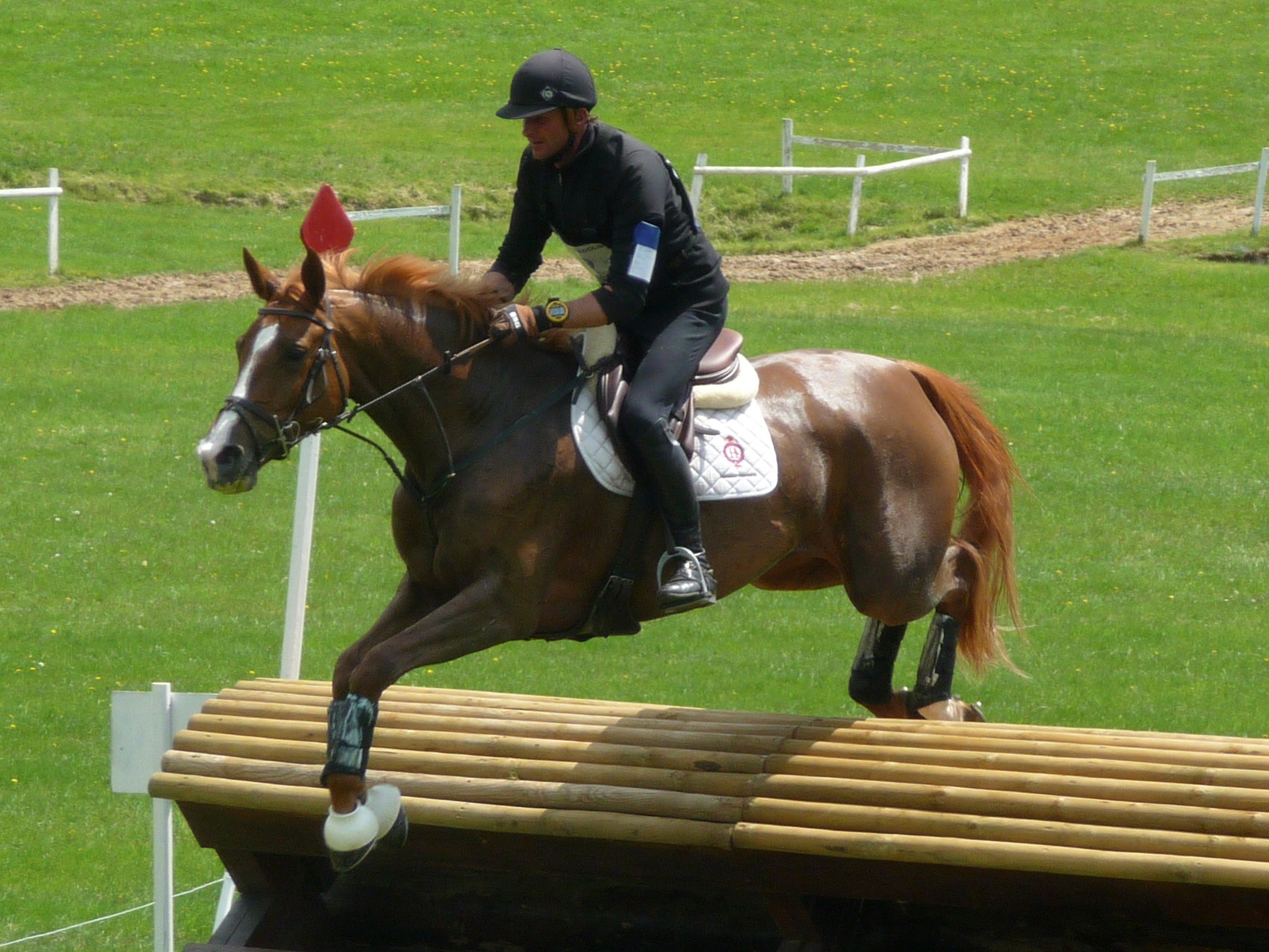

Personal information
- Born: 5 November 1961 (age 64) Dijon, France
Medal record
Equestrian
Representing France
European Championships
Silver medal – second place	2007 Pratoni del Vivaro	Team eventing

Didier Dhennin (born 5 November 1961 in Dijon, France) is a French Olympic eventing rider. He competed at the 2008 Summer Olympics where he placed 6th in individual and 11th in the team eventing.

Didier also participated at three European Eventing Championships (in 2007, 2009 and 2011). His biggest success came in 2007 when he won a team silver. Meanwhile, his best individual placement is 5th place from 2009.

From 1981 to 1997, he managed a riding school (created with his parents). He was already international rider and also organised eventing events as course designer.

Since 1987, he is a member of the French National Riding School: The Cadre Noir. As an 'Ecuyer', he teach technical and theoretical knowledge. He performed in the 'Reprise the Manege' (musical ride) of the Cadre Noir, in France and abroad.

From 2002 to 2017, he is part of the French national eventing team.

In 2016, he was approved International Level Cross Country Course Designer (1 and 2 stars). He built courses in Saumur (1 and 2 stars in 2018) and in Tartas (1 and 2 stars in 2017 and 2018)

== Results ==
- 2000 :
  - Winner of Eventing French National Championships with Darius du Plessis
  - Winner CCI2* in Vittel with Darius du Plessis and 3rd with Circé de Boriel
  - 3rd CCI2* in Haras du Pin with Darius du Plessis
- 2001 :
  - Winner of National French Cup in Jardy with Fine Fleur V ENE HN
  - Winner CCI2* in Jerez de la Frontera with Fine Fleur V ENE HN
- 2002:
  - Winner of FEI Eventing Young Horse World Championships (6 years old - CCI1*) in Lion d'Angers with Ismène du Temple
  - 2nd of the eventing young horse French national championships (4 years-old) in Pompadour with Kenzo de la Folie ENE HN
  - 2nd of the eventing young horse French national championships (6 years-old) in Pompadour with Ismène du Temple.
- 2003 :
  - Winner of the eventing young horse French national championships (7 years-old) in Dijon with Ismène du Temple
  - 2nd of the eventing young horse French national championships (4 years-old) in Pompadour with Lyvie Lerchenberg
- 2004 :
  - Winner of the eventing young horse French national championships (4 years-old) in Pompadour with Mistral de la Genètre
  - Winner of the eventing young horse French national championships (5 years-old) in Pompadour with Lyvie Lerchenberg
  - Winner of the eventing young horse French national championships (6 years-old) in Pompadour with Kerfina du Fief ENE HN
  - Winner CIC1* in Haras du Pin with Eratum du Merlon
  - 4th CIC2* in Haras du Pin with Ismène du Temple
- 2005 :
  - Winner CCI1* in Dijon with Hobby du Mee, 4th with San Joseph du Paon
  - Winner of the eventing young horse French national championships (4 years-old) in Pompadour with Nuage de Ribaud
  - 3rd of Eventing French National Championships in Saumur with Ismène du Temple
  - 4th CCI3* in Vittel with Ismène du Temple
  - 6th CCI2* in Dijon with Bambi de Briere
- 2006 :
  - 6th CCI3* in Saumur with Ismène du Temple
  - 7th Eventing French National Championships in Vittel with Ismène du Temple
  - Selected for World Equestrian Games in Aachen (withdrawal because of a fall before the competition).
- 2007 :
  - 2nd European Eventing Championships (team) in Pratoni Del Vivaro with Ismène du Temple
  - 6th CCI3* in Pratoni Del Vivaro with Ismène du Temple
  - 7th Eventing French National Championships in Saumur with Ismène du Temple
  - 10th FEI World Cup CIC3* in Fontainebleau with Ismène du Temple
- 2008 :
  - 6th Olympic Games Beijing (China) with Ismène du Temple
  - 6th CCI4* in Luhmühlen with Ismène du Temple
  - Winner of the French young horse national championships (4 years-old) in Pompadour with Quiva du Lerchengerg and 2nd with Quality Bois Margot
  - 3rd of the eventing young horse French national championships (6 years-old CIC1*) in Pompadour with Encore Une Médaille
  - 11th FEI Eventing Young Horse World Championships (6 years-old CCI1*) in Lion d'Angers with Encore Une Médaille
- 2009:
  - 5th European Eventing Championships (individual) in Fontainebleau with Ismène du Temple
  - 5th of the eventing young horse French national championships (7 years-old) in Dijon with Orlando Lerchenberg
  - 2nd of the eventing young horse French national championships (5 years-old) in Pompadour with Quality Bois Margot
  - 16th FEI Eventing Young Horse World Championships (7 years-old CIC2*) in Lion d'Angers with Encore Une Médaille
- 2010:
  - 6th CCI2* in Lignières with Opi de Saint Leo
  - 7th CCI2* in Dijon with Opi de Saint Leo and 8th with Encore Une Medaille
- 2011:
  - 3rd CIC3* in Jardy with Opi de Saint Leo
  - 6th CICO3* (team) in Aachen with Must des Sureaux
  - 8th CICO3* in Fontainebleau with Must des Sureaux
  - 6th of the eventing young horse French national championships (6 years-old CIC1*) in Pompadour with Regensburg d'Uriat
  - 9th of the eventing young horse French national championships (7 years-old) in Saumur with Quantus Lerchenberg
  - 13th CCI3* in Boekelo with Opi de Saint Leo
  - Parpicipation CCI4* de Badminton with Ismène du Temple
  - Participation European Eventing Championships in Luhmühlen with Must des Sureaux
- 2012:
  - 5th of the eventing young horse French national trophy (7 years-old) in Pompadour with Regensburg d'Uriat
  - 8th CIC3* in Jardy with Encore Une Médaille
  - 11th CIC3* FEI World Cup in Haras du Pin with Encore Une Médaille
  - Participation CCI4* de Pau with Encore Une Médaille
- 2013:
  - 3rd CCI3* in Bramham with Opi de Saint Leo
  - 3rd CICO3* (team) in Fontainebleau with Opi De Saint Leo
  - Participation CIC3* in Marbach with Opi de Saint Leo and Encore Une Médaille
- 2014:
  - 4th CCIO3* in Malmö with Opi de Saint Leo
  - 3rd CIC3* de Jardy with Opi de Saint Leo
  - Participation CCIO3* in Boekelo with Opi de Saint Leo
- 2015:
  - Winner CCIO3* in Montelibretti with Opi de Saint Leo
  - 3rd CCI2* in Montelibretti with T'as Du Pot and 4th with Rien Qu'un Crack
  - 4th CIC2* in Montelibretti with Troubadour Camphoux
  - 7th CIC3* in Bramham with Opi de Saint Leo
  - 9th CIC3* in Ravenne with T'as Du Pot
- 2016:
  - Winner CIC2* in Saumur with Rien Qu'un Crack
  - Winner CIC2* in Jardy with Rien Qu'un Crack
  - 6th CCI2* in Arville with Troubadour Camphoux
  - 20th CICO3* in Houghton Hall with Troubadour Camphoux
- 2017:
  - Winner CCI2* in Jardy with Troubadour Camphoux and 4th with Vidoc De Loume
  - Participation CCI3* in Saumur with Troubadour Camphoux
- 2018:
  - Winner of the eventing young horse French national trophy (4 years-old) in Pompadour with Eglantine du Pouler and 3rd with Eden des Muzes
  - 10th of the eventing young horse French national trophy (5 years-old) in Pompadour with Nemesis Pompadour

== Achievement as a cross country course designer ==
- Didier DHENNIN has more than 20 years of experience as a cross country course designer (national level).
- 2016: Approved International Level (1 and 2 stars)
  - Assistant course designer (Pierre LE GOUPIL) in Le Pouget CCI2* and CIC3*
- 2017: Labelised French National Elite course designer
  - Cross country course designer in Tartas CCI1*, CCI2* and CIC2*
- 2018:
  - Cross country course designer in Saumur CCI1* et CIC2*
  - Cross country course designer in Tartas CCI1*, CCI2* et CIC2*
  - Assistant course designer (Pierre MICHELET) in Saumur CCI3*
  - Assistant course designer (Francesco FINOCCHIARO) in Montelibretti CCI3* et CIC3*
