= Ostholt =

Ostholt is a surname. Notable people with the surname include:

- Frank Ostholt (born 1975), German equestrian
- Sara Algotsson Ostholt (born 1974), Swedish equestrian
