= Samantha Taylor (disambiguation) =

Samantha Taylor (born 1958) is a Canadian TV host.

Samantha Taylor or Sam Taylor may also refer to:

- The Cardcaptors name for the Cardcaptor Sakura character Sonomi Daidouji
- Samantha Claire Taylor (born 1975), British cricketer
- Samantha Taylor (equestrian) (born 1983), Canadian equestrian
- Sam Taylor (film producer), British film producer, co-founder of Film and Music Entertainment
- Sam Taylor-Johnson (born 1967), British filmmaker, photographer and visual artist

== See also ==
- Sam Taylor (disambiguation)
