= Geoffrey Curran =

Geoffrey Curran may refer to:

- Geoffrey Curran (equestrian) (born 1980), Irish equestrian
- Geoffrey Curran (cyclist) (born 1995), American cyclist
