= Samuel Taylor =

Samuel, Sam or Sammy Taylor (male first name) may refer to:

== Arts ==
- Sam Taylor (director) (1895–1958), American film director and screenwriter
- Samuel W. Taylor (1907–1997), American author
- Samuel A. Taylor (1912–2000), playwright and screenwriter
- Sam Taylor (saxophonist) (1916–1990), jazz and blues player
- Sam Taylor (blues musician) (1934–2009), American musician
- Samuel Jared Taylor (born 1951), American journalist
- Sam Taylor (producer) (born c.1953), American rock music producer
- Sam Taylor (author) (born 1970), British author

== Politics ==
- Samuel Taylor (Virginia politician) (1781–1853), American politician and lawyer from Virginia
- Samuel M. Taylor (1852–1921), American politician from the state of Arkansas
- Samuel McIntire Taylor (1856–1916), Republican politician in Ohio
- Sam T. Taylor (1903–1977), Colorado state senator

== Sports ==
- Samuel Taylor (American football), American football coach
- Sam Taylor (English footballer) (1893–1973), English footballer
- Sam B. Taylor (1898–1966), American baseball player and football coach
- Samuel "Bay" Taylor (1929–2019), Negro league baseball player
- Sammy Taylor (footballer, born 1933) (1933–2013), Scottish footballer
- Sammy Taylor (baseball) (1933–2019), American baseball catcher
- Sam Taylor (Australian footballer) (born 1999), Australian rules footballer
- Samuel Taylor (footballer, born 2003), English footballer
- Sam Taylor (field hockey) (born 2001), English field hockey player

== Other ==
- Samuel Taylor (stenographer) (1748/9–1811), invented widely used shorthand system
- Samuel Penfield Taylor (1827–1886), American entrepreneur
- Samuel Taylor (bishop) (1859–1929), Bishop of Kingston in the Church of England
- Samuel Harvey Taylor (1807–1871), American educator
- Sam Taylor (Family Affairs), a fictional character on the UK soap opera Family Affairs

== See also ==
- Samantha Taylor (disambiguation)
- Sam Taylor-Wood (born 1967), British filmmaker
- Samuel Taylor Coleridge (1772–1834), British poet
- Samuel Taylor Suit (1830–1888), Maryland politician and landowner
- Samuel Coleridge-Taylor (1875–1912), British composer
