= Luhmühlen Horse Trials =

Annual equestrian eventing competition in Luhmühlen, Salzhausen, Germany

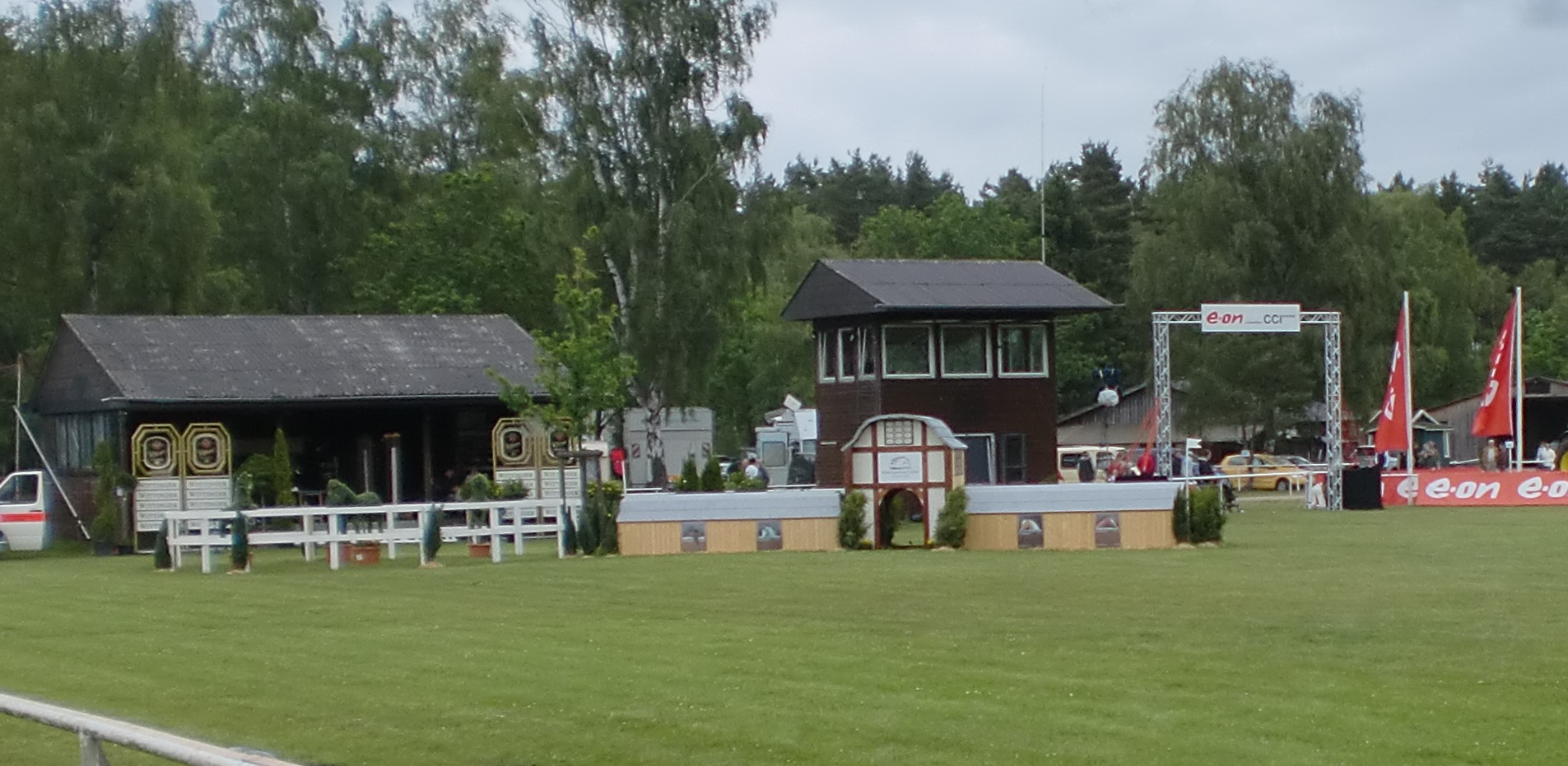
Show grounds in 2010

The Luhmühlen Horse Trials are an annual equestrian eventing competition held in Luhmühlen, Salzhausen, Germany. Riders compete at the highest level: the CCI*****. There are only Seven events of this kind in the world, the others being the Badminton Horse Trials, the Burghley Horse Trials, the Kentucky Three-Day Event, the Australian International Three Day Event, the Stars of Pau and the Maryland Horse Trials.

Luhmühlen originally held CCI** and CCI*** events. The CCI**** event was first held in 2005, making it the first event in mainland Europe to hold an eventing competition at that level. Luhmühlen follows the new format, "without steeplechase."

After the 2018 season, the FEI added an introductory level below CCI*, bumping all subsequent levels upward. While there was no change to the difficulty of the competition, the added level forced all former CCI**** competitions to re-classify as CCI*****.

In 1982 Luhmühlen hosted the Eventing World Championship. In August 2019 Luhmühlen was the venue of the European Eventing Championships for the sixth time (1975, 1979, 1987, 1999, 2011, 2019). Before the 2011 event the show ground was completely rebuilt.

== Winners ==
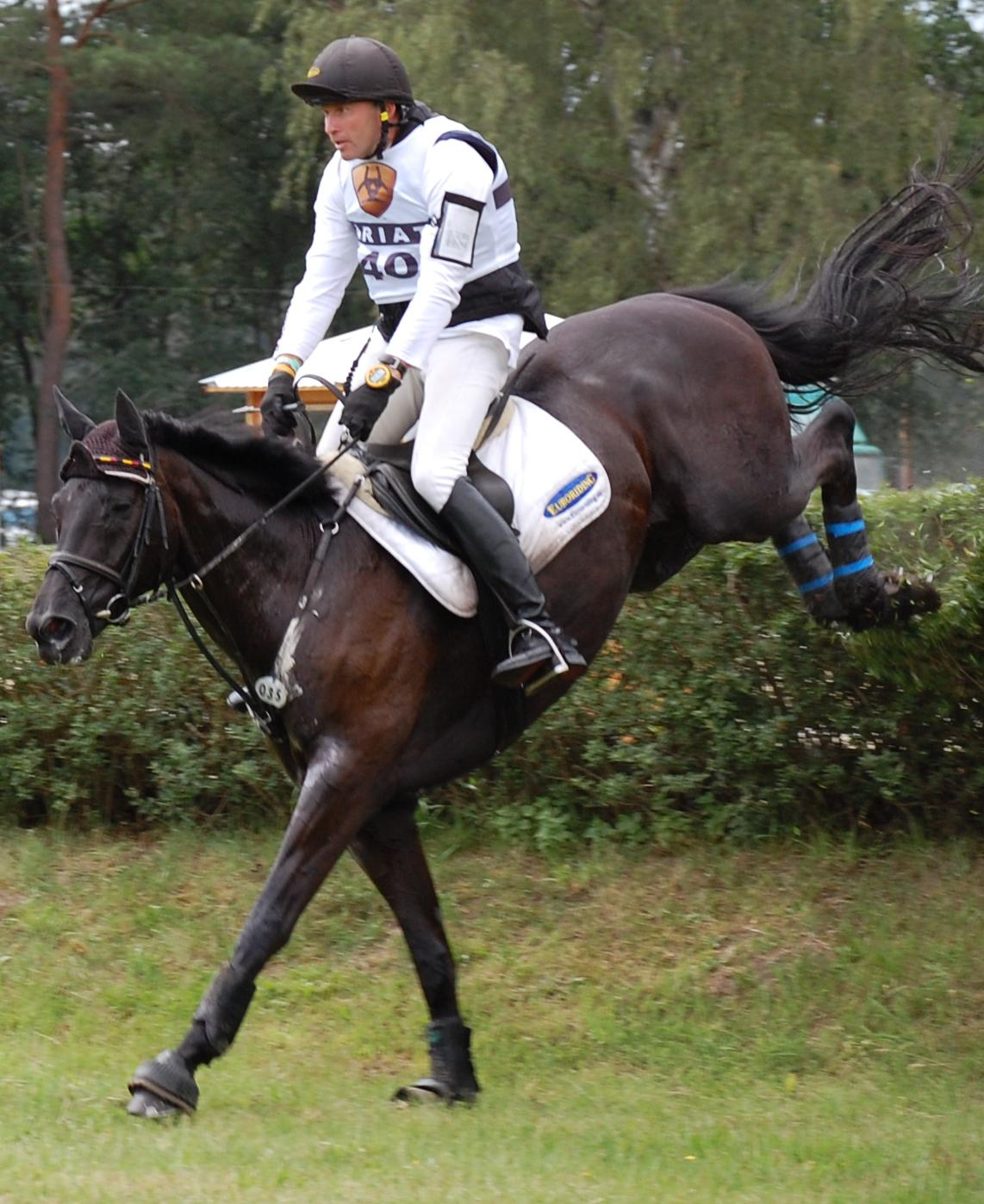
Andreas Dibowski winning in 2011

Year	Rider	Horse	Notes
2005	Bettina Hoy (GER)	Ringwood Cockatoo	
2006	Frank Ostholt (GER)	Air Jordan	
2007	Ruth Edge (GBR)	Two Thyme	
2008	William Fox-Pitt (GBR)	Macchiato	
2009	Michael Jung (GER)	La Biosthetique-Sam FBW	
2010	Sharon Hunt (GBR)	Tankers Town	
2011	Andreas Dibowski (GER)	FRH Butts Leon	
2012	Michael Jung (GER)	Leopin FST	
2013	Andrew Nicholson (NZL)	Mr Cruise Control	
2014	Tim Price (NZL)	Wesko	
2015	Ingrid Klimke (GER)	FRH Escada JS	
2016	Andreas Dibowski (GER)	It's Me XX	
2017	Julia Krajewski (GER)	Samourai du Thot	
2018	Jonelle Price (NZL)	Faerie Dianimo	
2019	Tim Price (NZL)	Ascona M	
2020	cancelled (COVID-19 pandemic)		
2021	Mollie Summerland (GBR)	Charly van ter Heiden	
2022	Felix Vogg (SUI)	Colero	
2023	Laura Collett (GBR)	London 52	
2024	Lara de Liederkerke-Meier (BEL)	Hooney d'Arville	
2025	Rosalind Canter (GBR)	Izilot DHI	

== Incidents ==
Riders

- 2012: Selina Elliot (GBR) fell from her mount Bodidily and was hospitalized with a broken pelvis.
- 2014: Benjamin Winter (GER) died of severe head trauma when he fell from his mount Ispo at fence 20 during the cross-country portion of the event.

Horses

- 2010: Alter Ego, the mount of Kate Walls (GBR) fell and broke his back during the cross country portion of the event. The horse was successfully rehabilitated.
- 2013: P'tite Bombe, ridden by Emeric George (FRA) was euthanized after falling at fence 12 during the cross-country portion of the event.
- 2014: Liberal, ridden by Tom Crisp (GBR) died after collapsing near the eighth fence on the cross-country course. Six other riders retired on cross-country before completing the course
- 2018: Axel Z, ridden by Chloe Raty (BEL) was euthanized after suffering spinal injuries during a rotational fall on cross-country.
- 2023: Solaguayre California, ridden by Tammie Smith (USA) was euthanized after fracturing her knee when hitting it on a fence during cross country.
