= Roberto Rotatori =

Italian equestrian

Personal information
- Nationality: Italian
- Born: 14 November 1967 (age 58) Milan, Italy

Sport
- Sport: Equestrian
Medal record
Equestrian
Representing Italy
European Championships
Silver medal – second place	2009 Fontainebleau	Team eventing
Bronze medal – third place	2007 Pratoni del Vivaro	Team eventing

Roberto Rotatori (born 14 November 1967) is an Italian equestrian. He competed in two events at the 2008 Summer Olympics.
