= Éric Vigeanel =

French equestrian

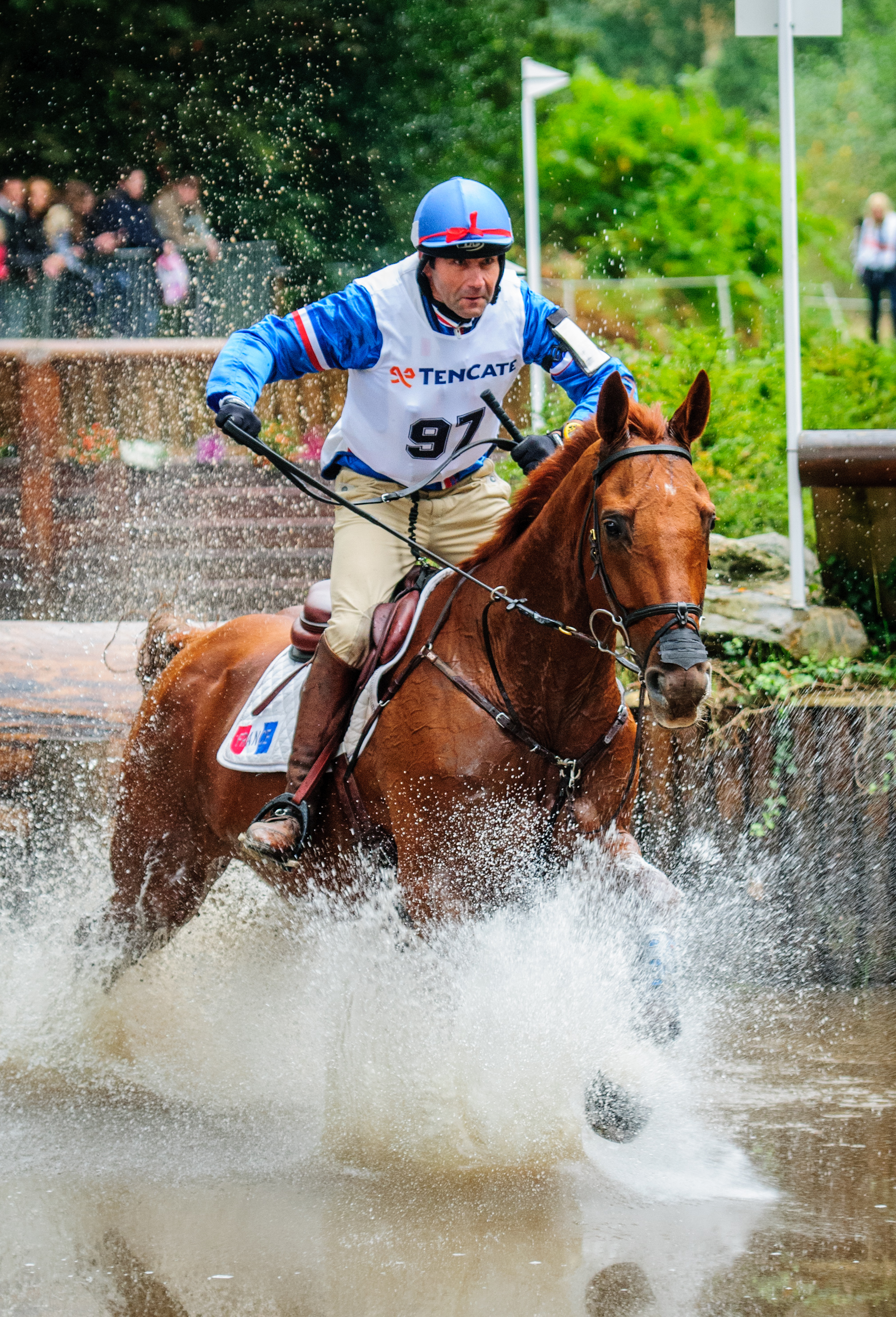

Personal information
- Born: 4 August 1972 (age 53) Saint-Mandé, Val-de-Marne, France
Medal record
Equestrian
Representing France
European Championships
Silver medal – second place	2007 Pratoni del Vivaro	Team eventing

Éric Vigeanel (born 4 August 1972) is a French Olympic eventing rider. Representing France, he competed at the 2008 Summer Olympics where she placed 11th in team and 20th in the individual eventing.

Vigeanel also participated at two European Eventing Championships (in 2007 and 2009). His biggest success came in 2007 when he won a team silver.
