= Jeferson Moreira =

Brazilian equestrian

Personal information
- Born: 27 September 1965 (age 59); Passo Fundo, Brazil

Sport
- Sport: Equestrian

Jeferson Moreira (born 27 September 1965) is a Brazilian equestrian. He competed in two events at the 2008 Summer Olympics.
