= Sharon Hunt =

British equestrian

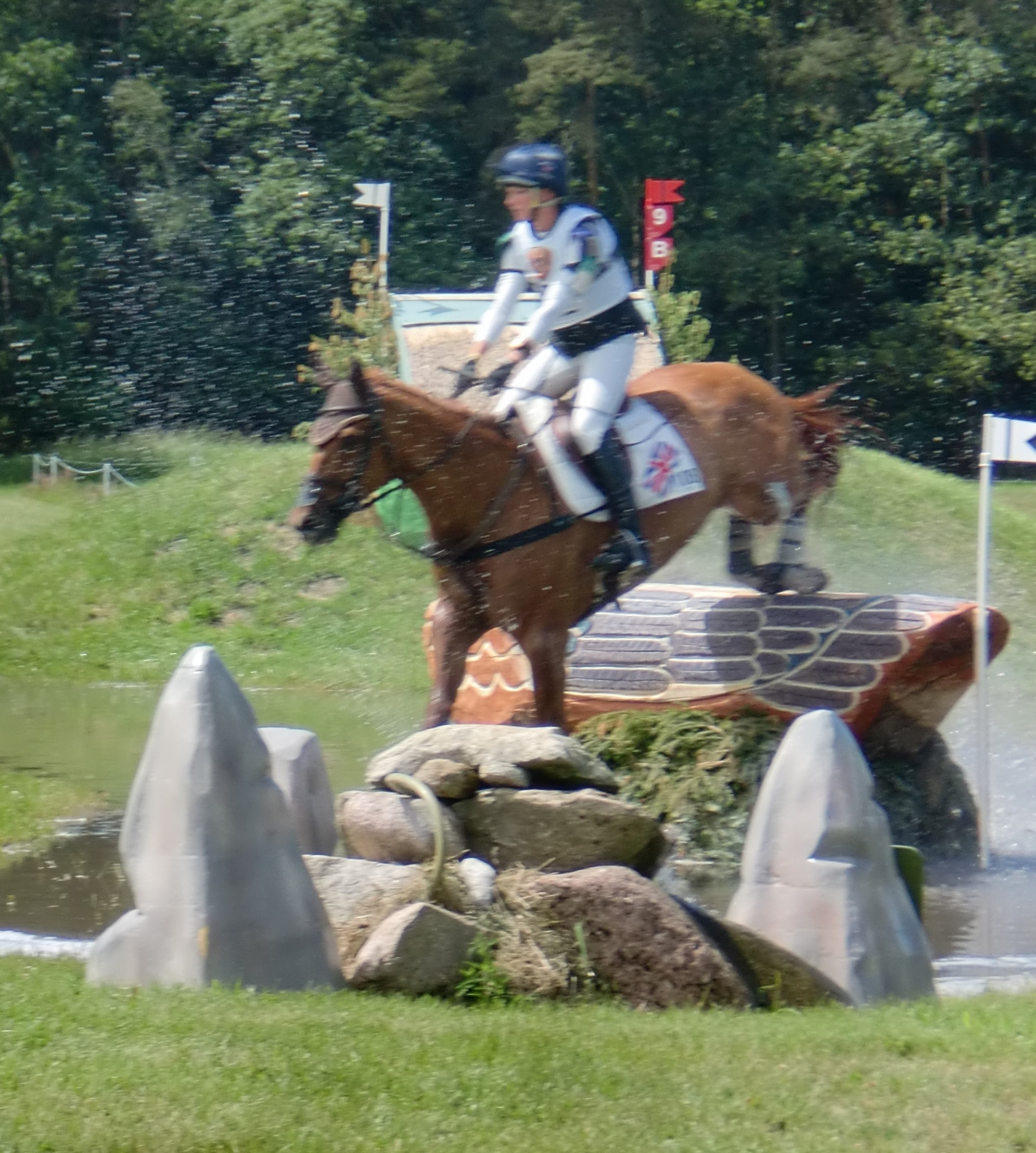
- Sharon Hunt and Tankers Town, CCI**** Luhmühlen 2010

Medal record

Equestrian

Olympic Games
Bronze medal – third place	2008 Beijing	Team eventing

Sharon Ann Hunt (born 11 October 1977 in Bury St Edmunds) is a British three-day eventing rider.

Hunt was educated at Culford School and the Perse School for Girls. With her horse Tankers Town, she was fifth at Badminton Horse Trials then she won the bronze medal for Great Britain in the team eventing at the 2008 Summer Olympics in Beijing.

In the spring of 2006 Hunt was 6th at badminton horse trials with Tankers Town. This gained her a place as an individual at the World Equestrian Games, in Aachen, Germany, where she finished 9th.

In June 2010, Sharon Hunt and Tankers Town won the 2010 Luhmühlen Horse Trials (CCI 4*).
