= Niall Griffin =

Irish equestrian (born 1977)

Niall Griffin (born 12 August 1977) is an Irish equestrian.

He participated at the 2004 Summer Olympics in Athens. He competed at the 2008 Summer Olympics in Beijing, where he placed 8th in team eventing with the Irish team. He also competed in individual eventing.
