= Patricia Ryan (equestrian) =

Irish equestrian

Patricia Donegan-Ryan
Personal information
- Nationality: Irish
- Born: 10 December 1973 (age 51) Bandon, Ireland

Sport
- Sport: Equestrian

Patricia Ryan (born 10 December 1973) is an Irish equestrian.

== Career ==
At the 2000 Summer Olympics in Sydney she placed fifth in individual eventing. She competed at the 2008 Summer Olympics in Beijing, where she placed 8th in team eventing with the Irish team. She also competed in individual eventing.

== Personal life ==
Ryan is married to Irish equestrian, Michael Ryan, who also competed at the Olympics.
