= Clayton Fredericks =

Australian equestrian (born 1967)

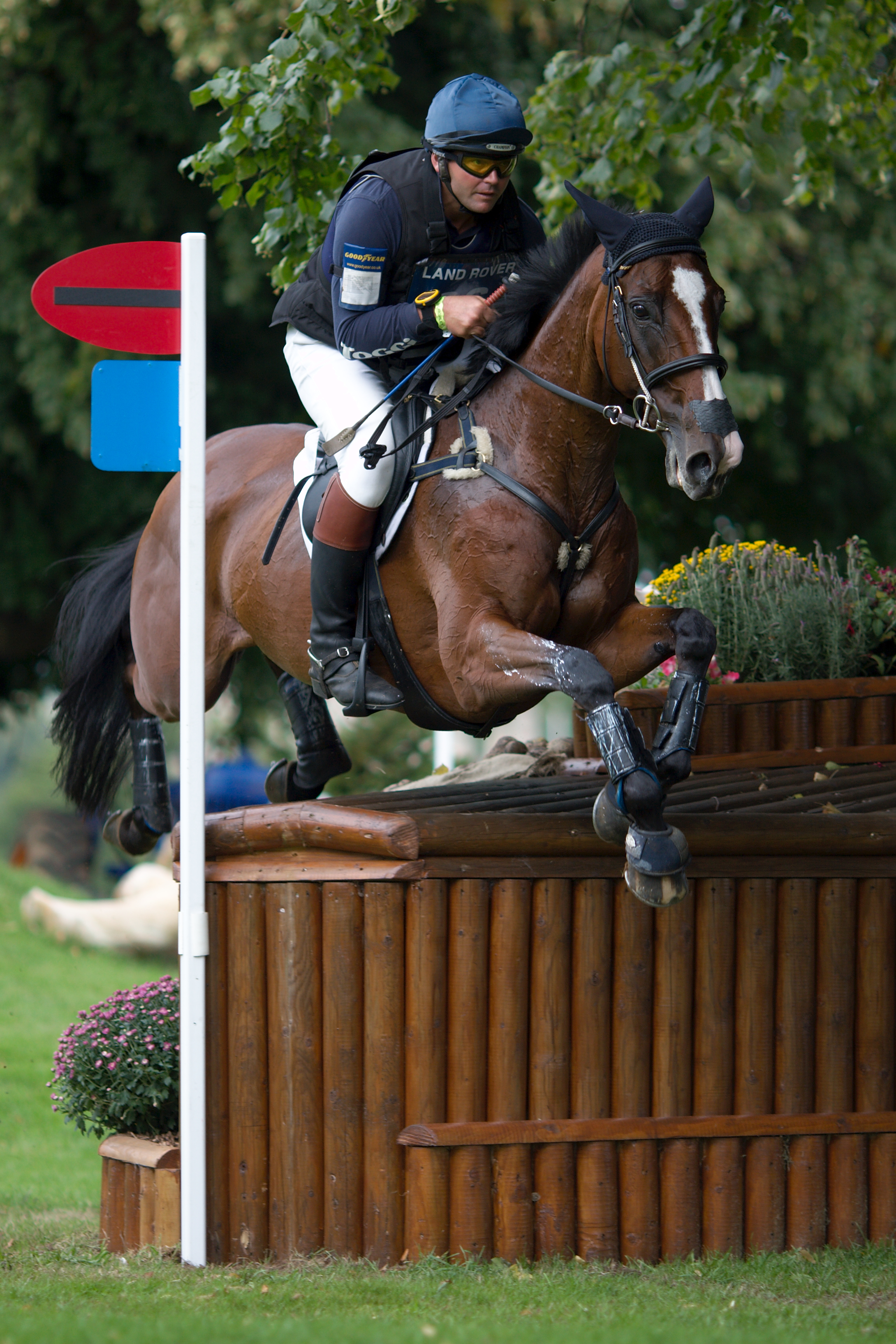
- Clayton Fredericks and Be My Guest II at the Dairy Farm during the cross-country phase of Burghley Horse Trials 2010.

Medal record

Representing Australia

Equestrian

Olympic Games
| Silver medal – second place | 2008 Beijing | Team eventing |

World Games
| Silver medal – second place | 2006 Aachen | Individual eventing |
| Bronze medal – third place | 2006 Aachen | Team eventing |

Clayton Fredericks (born 17 November 1967 in Moora, Western Australia) is an Australian equestrian who won a silver medal at the 2008 Summer Olympics in Beijing as part of the three-day eventing team. He currently lives in Ocala, Florida.

Fredericks attended school at Wesley College, Perth. He has a daughter, Ellie Fredericks, who was born in 2004. He started riding at the age of eight, riding at showing classes in and around Perth, Western Australia. He first discovered cross-country at the age of 16 when he entered a pony club tetrathlon.

He regularly holds coaching clinics in the UK and Europe and acted as Hong Kong's Chef d'Equipe at the 2002 Asian Games in Busan, South Korea. He has also been named interim chairman of the UK's Event Rider's Association.

Major results can be viewed at FEI website here http://fei.infostradasports.com/asp/lib/theasp.asp?pageid=8937&sportid=312&personid=567461&refreshauto=1.

Fredericks' 2012 Olympic campaign hit a stumbling block when he was hospilitalised after a fall at the Saumar event in France. He made a quick recovery to win the 2012 CIC3* Renswoude event in the Netherlands and cement his spot in the Australian Team.

He was part of the 2012 London Olympics equestrian team with his wife Lucinda, Andrew Hoy, Chris Burton and Sam Griffiths. He fell and was eliminated in the cross country.

He was appointed to the position of Coach to the Canadian team in January 2013 and has now relocated to Ocala, Florida where he has started up Fredericks Equestrian International and is based out of Oak Lane Farm.

Recent Performances

•1st - 2012 CIC3* Renswoude (Renswoude, Netherlands)

•1st - 2012 CIC3* Jardy (Jardy, France)

•3rd - 2012 CICO3* Fontainebleau (Fontainebleau, France)

•6th - 2011 CCI4* Pau (Pau, France)

•1st - 2011 CCI3* Saumur (Saumur, France)

•17th - 2011 CICO3* Aachen (Aachen, Germany)

•2nd - 2011 CIC3* Barroca d'Alva (Barroca d'Alva, Portugal)

Career Highlights

•Being part of 2012 London Team for Australia

•Winning the individual silver medal and team bronze at the World Championships

•Becoming the World Cup Champion twice in 2005 and 2008

•Winning Olympic silver in Beijing with the team
