= Louise Lyons =

Irish equestrian

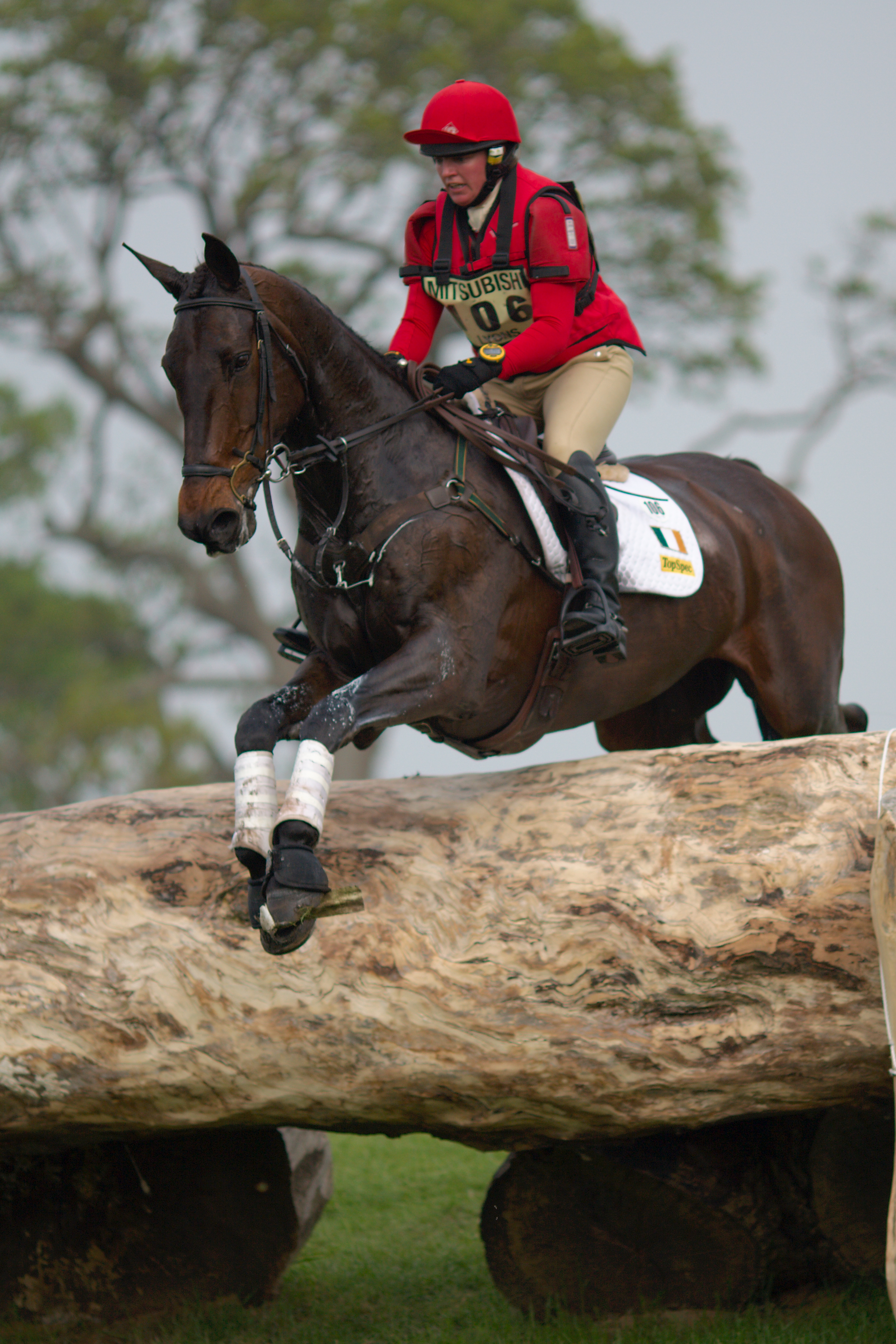
- Louise Lyons and Murphy's Miracle at the Quarry during the cross-country phase of Badminton Horse Trials 2011

Personal information
- Full name: Louise Lyons
- Nationality: Ireland
- Discipline: Eventing

Louise Lyons (born 1976) is an Irish equestrian.

She competed at the 2008 Summer Olympics in Beijing, where she was part of the Irish team that placed 8th in the team eventing competition. She also competed in individual eventing.
