= Samantha Taylor (equestrian) =

Canadian equestrian

Personal information
- Nationality: Canadian
- Born: 25 May 1983 (age 43) Vancouver, British Columbia, Canada

Sport
- Sport: Equestrian

Samantha Taylor (born 25 May 1983) is a Canadian equestrian. She competed in two events at the 2008 Summer Olympics.
