= Daisy Dick =

British three-day eventing rider

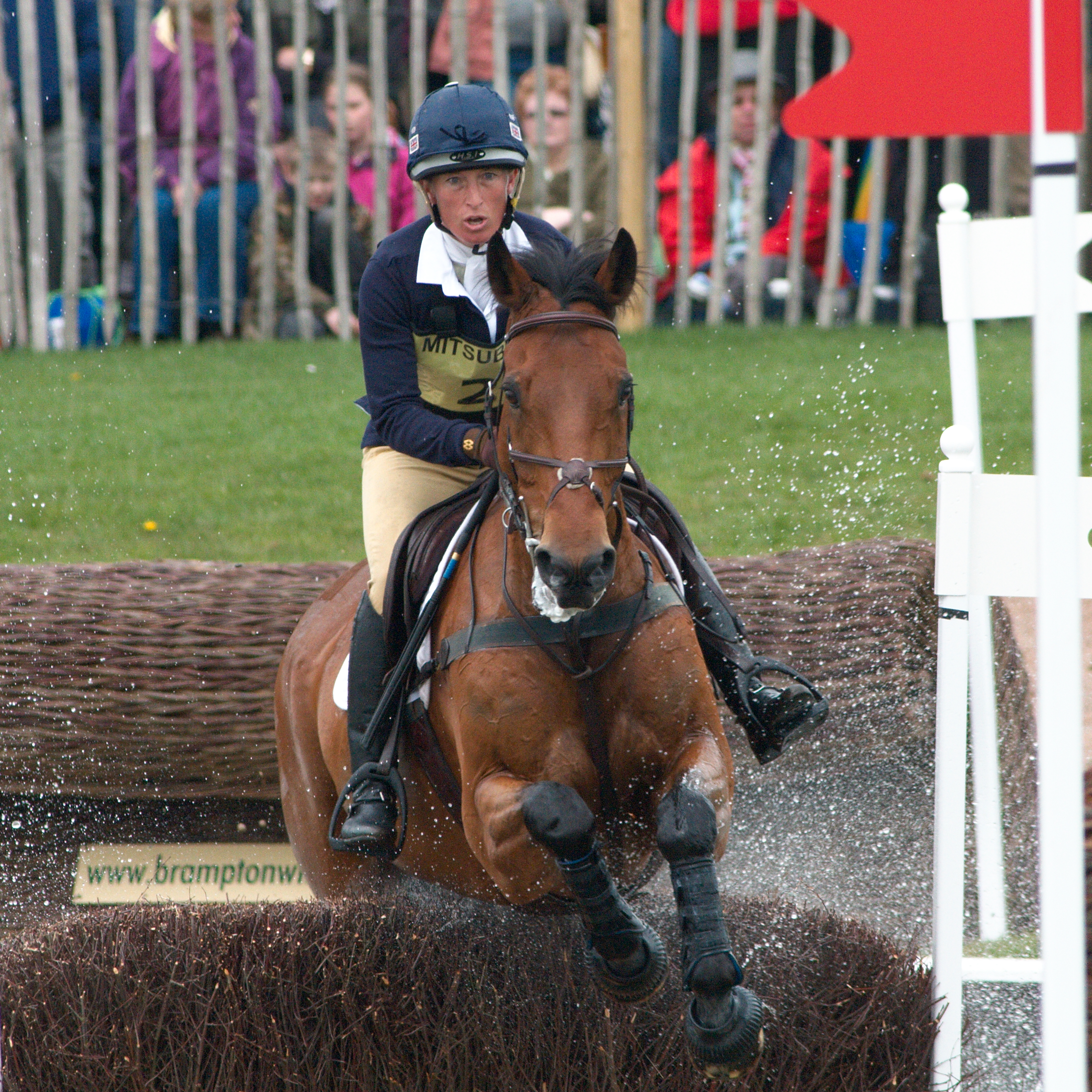
- Daisy Dick and Spring Along jump the Lake during the cross-country phase of Badminton Horse Trials 2008

Personal information
- Full name: Daisy Berkeley
- Nationality: United Kingdom
- Discipline: Eventing
- Born: 29 March 1972 (age 54); Oxford
Medal record
Representing Great Britain
Equestrian
Olympic Games
Bronze medal – third place	2008 Beijing	Team eventing
European Championships
Gold medal – first place	2007 Pratoni del Vivaro	Team eventing

Katherine Mary "Daisy" Dick (born 29 March 1972) is a British three-day eventing rider. With her horse Spring Along, she won the bronze medal for Great Britain in the team eventing at the 2008 Summer Olympics in Beijing. She studied at Worcester College, Oxford.

Dick is the daughter of jockey Dave Dick and eventing rider Caroline Dick. In October 2009, she married Charles Berkeley, scion of Berkeley Castle.
