= Andreas Dibowski =

German eventing rider

Andreas Dibowski german horse rider
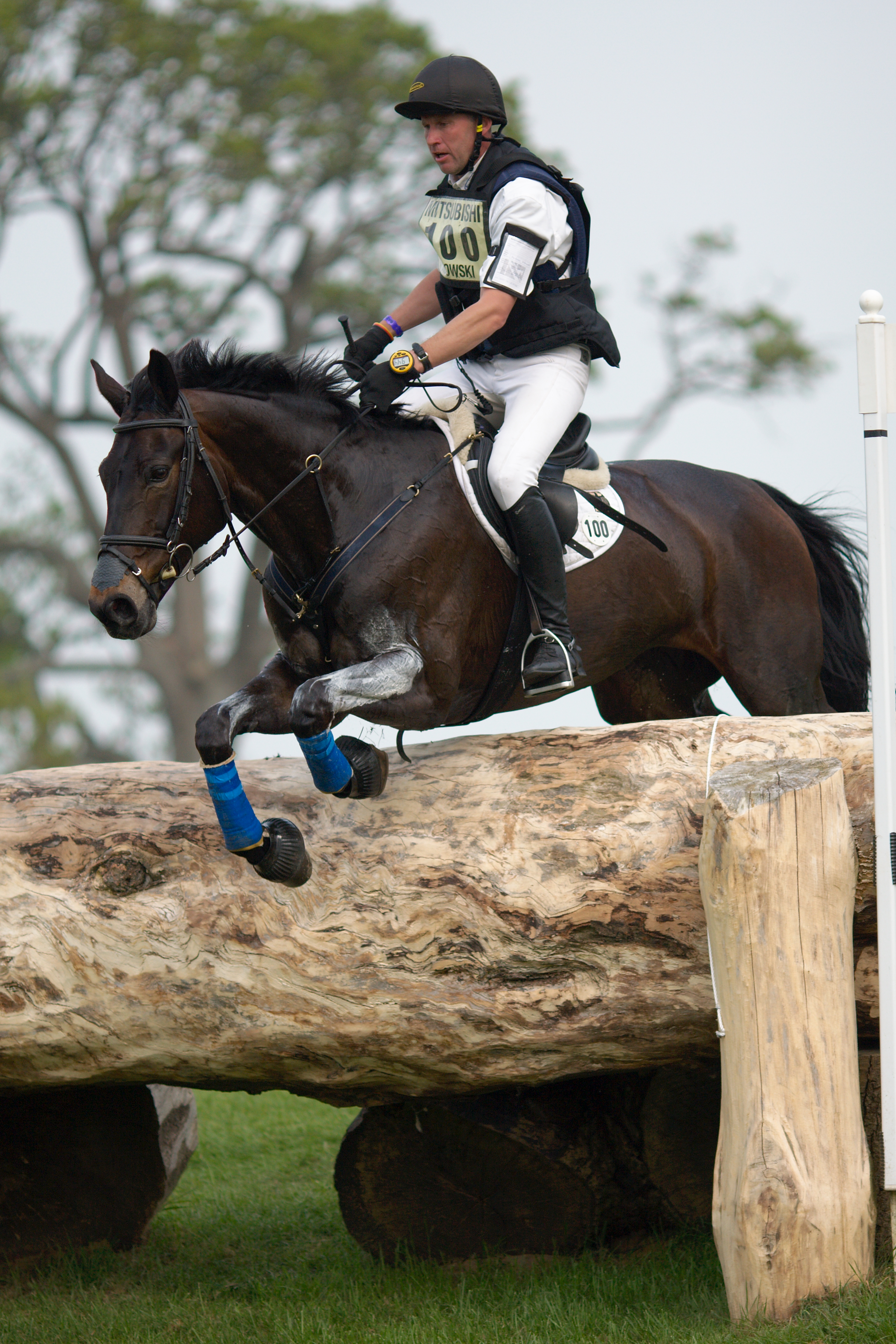
- Andreas Dibowski and FRH Fantasia at the Quarry during the cross-country phase of Badminton Horse Trials 2011

Personal information
- Nationality: Germany
- Discipline: Eventing
- Born: 29 March 1966 (age 59); Hamburg, West Germany
Medal record
Equestrian
Representing Germany
Olympic Games
Gold medal – first place	2008 Beijing	Team eventing
European Championships
Gold medal – first place	2011 Luhmühlen	Team eventing
Gold medal – first place	2013 Malmo	Team eventing
Gold medal – first place	2019 Luhmühlen	Team eventing
Silver medal – second place	2021 Avenches	Team eventing

Andreas Dibowski (born 29 March 1966 in Hamburg) is a German eventing rider. With his horse Butts Leon he won a gold medal in team eventing at the 2008 Summer Olympics.

He is based in Dohle, near Hamburg in North Germany where he runs his own training yard.

== Career ==
Aged 15 Andreas began training as a groom at the National Riding School in Hoya followed by two years in California in a show jumping yard. On returning to Germany he began teaching and became National Champion (1989) with Just Be Fair.

In 1991 he competed in the Bundeschampionat (the national championships for young horses) with three horses in three different disciplines and two years later enjoyed his first international success in eventing when placed second in the CCI** at Falsterbo with FRH Amadeus. Within seven years and success with several horses he was selected for the German Olympic team in Sydney 2000 with Andora (team 4th) then Athens 2004 and was a member of the team that won Olympic gold in Beijing (2008).

Andreas has won 3 four* events

Pau 2010 - FRH Fantasia

Luhmuhlen 2011 - Butts Leon

Luhmuhlen 2016 - It's Me xxx

He currently has several international horses in training including the eventing stallion Mighty Magic with whom he won the World Young Horse Championships at Le Lions in 2010, Butts Avedon also by Heraldik and Leon's half brother Butts Leonardo R (out of the same mare but by the trakehner Buddenbruck).

== Personal life ==
He is married to rider Susanna and the couple has three children. As an aside to eventing, Andreas enjoys breeding doves and exotic birds.

He is 1.81m tall and weighs 73 kg.
