= Peter Thomsen =

German equestrian (born 1961)

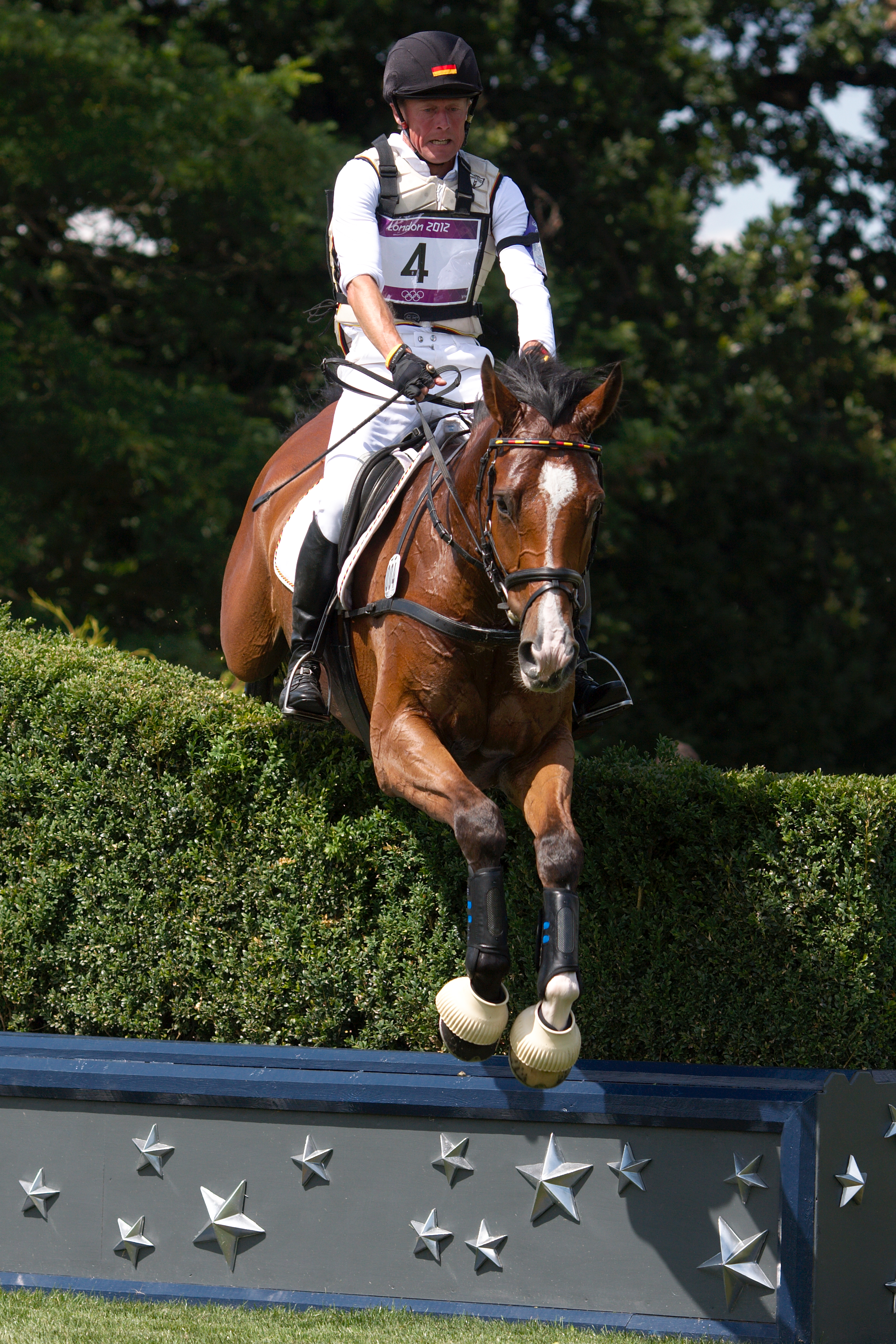
- Peter Thomsen and Barny, competing in the 2012 Summer Olympics in London.

Medal record

Representing Germany

Equestrian

Olympic Games
Gold medal – first place	2008 Beijing	Team eventing
Gold medal – first place	2012 London	Team eventing

European Championships
Silver medal – second place	1999 Luhmühlen	Team eventing

Peter Thomsen (born 4 April 1961 in Flensburg, West Germany) is a German eventing rider. He won the gold medal in team eventing at the 2008 Summer Olympics with his horse The Ghost of Hamish, and again at the 2012 Summer Olympics with his horse Barny.
