= Ingrid Klimke =

German eventing rider

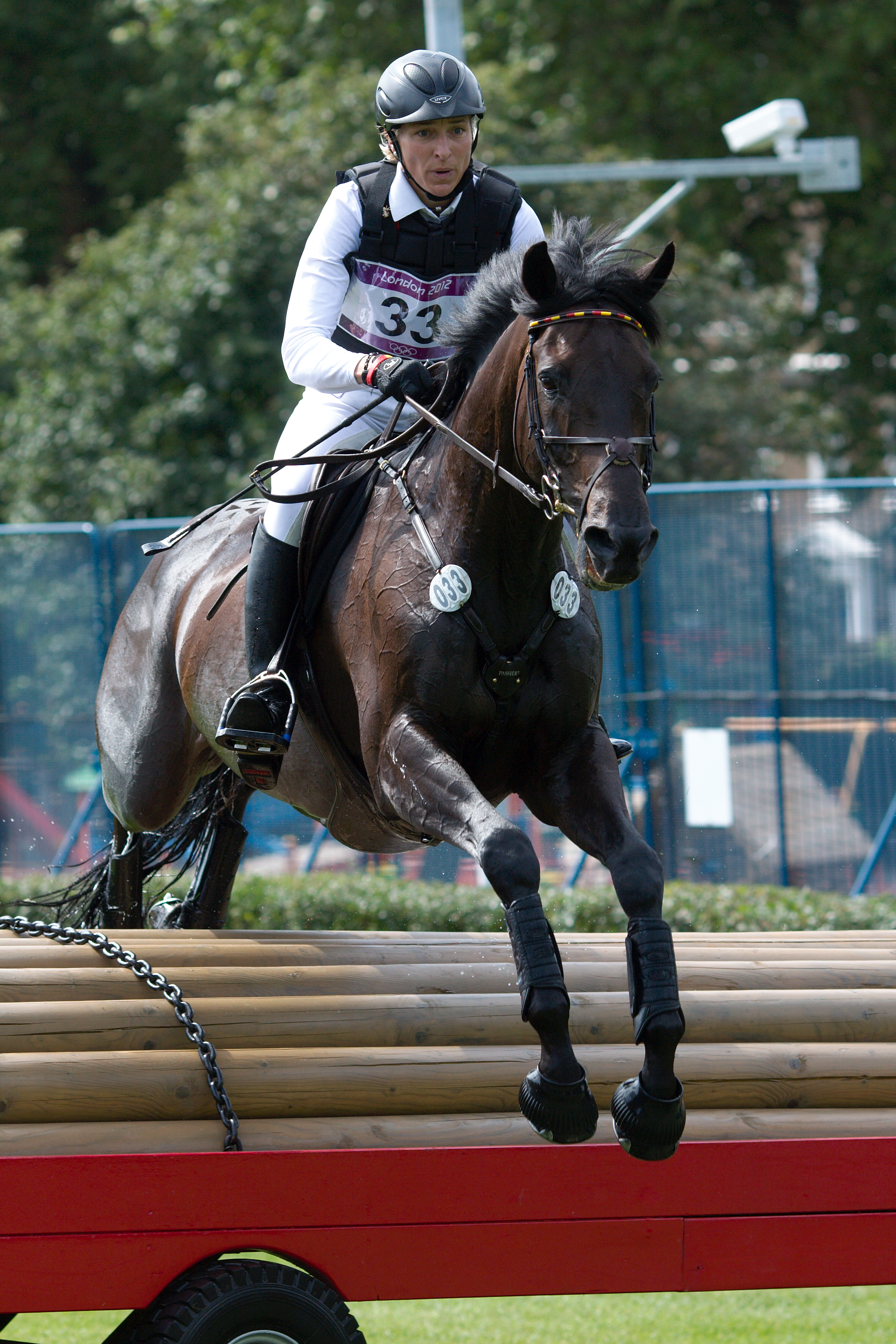
- Ingrid Klimke and Butts Abraxxas competing at the 2012 Summer Olympics in London.

Medal record

Equestrian

Representing Germany

Olympic Games
Gold medal – first place	2008 Beijing	Team eventing
Gold medal – first place	2012 London	Team eventing
Silver medal – second place	2016 Rio de Janeiro	Team eventing

World Equestrian Games
Gold medal – first place	2006 Aachen	Team eventing
Gold medal – first place	2014 Normandy	Team eventing
Bronze medal – third place	2018 Tryon	Individual eventing
Bronze medal – third place	2022 Herning	Team dressage

European Championships
Gold medal – first place	2011 Luhmühlen	Team eventing
Gold medal – first place	2013 Malmo	Team eventing
Gold medal – first place	2015 Blair Castle	Team eventing
Gold medal – first place	2017 Strzegom	Individual eventing
Gold medal – first place	2019 Luhmühlen	Team eventing
Gold medal – first place	2019 Luhmühlen	Individual eventing
Silver medal – second place	2013 Malmo	Individual eventing
Silver medal – second place	2021 Avenches	Team eventing
Bronze medal – third place	2005 Blenheim	Individual eventing

Ingrid Klimke (born 1 April 1968 in Münster, West Germany) is a German eventing rider. She appeared at five Olympics from 2000 to 2016. With her horse Abraxxas, she won two gold medals in team eventing at the 2008 Summer Olympics and the 2012 Summer Olympics. At the 2016 Summer Olympics, she won a team silver with Hale-Bob.

She is the daughter of equestrian Reiner Klimke. Like her father, she rides in both eventing and dressage at international events, for example, she was placed seventh at the 2002 Dressage World Cup Final with Nector van het Carelshof. In 2022, she made her debut on the German dressage team at the World Championships, where she was awarded a team bronze medal.

In January 2012 she was appointed to the position of "Reitmeister" (Riding Master, a special title of the German Equestrian Federation). Klimke is the second woman ever to be appointed as "Reitmeister".

== Youth ==
Through her father, Klimke started to work with horses at a very young age.

She states that she never thought about a career in equestrianism. Since her youth she has been competing in dressage, show jumping and eventing. Her trainers were, besides her father, Fritz Ligges and Ian Millar. About her trainers she says:

I received a consistent training from all of them, which was geared to develop an intensive bonding between horse and rider and to never overburden the horses. Being Ian Millar’s working student I learned everything about care and show jumping and I am really grateful towards my father for making that stay abroad possible.

After her school days, she began an apprenticeship as a bank clerk and afterwards she began to study to become a teacher. Later she realized that it was not possible to this and keep riding at the same time so she decided to dedicate herself to equestrianism and horse training.

== CCI5* results ==
Results
Event	Kentucky	Badminton	Luhmühlen	Burghley	Pau	Adelaide
2006		(silver) (Sleep Late)				
2007			WD (Sleep Late)			
2008-2009	Did not participate					
2010			(silver) (Butts Abraxxas)			
2011		EL (Butts Abraxxas)				
2012	Did not participate					
2013		16th (Butts Abraxxas)	RET (RF Tabasco)	4th (Butts Abraxxas)		
2014			28th (Hale Bob)		(gold) (Hale Bob)	
2015		(silver) (Hale Bob)	(gold) (Escada)			
2016	Did not participate					
2017		9th (Hale Bob)				
EL = Eliminated; RET = Retired; WD = Withdrew

== International championship results ==
Results
Year	Event	Horse	Placing	Notes
1999	European Championships	Sleep Late	39th	Individual
2000	Olympic Games	Sleep Late	4th	Team
2002	Dressage World Cup Final	Nector vh Carelshof	7th	
2004	Olympic Games	Sleep Late	4th	Team
2004	Olympic Games	Sleep Late	RET	Individual
2005	European Championships	Sleep Late	3rd place, bronze medalist(s)	Individual
2006	World Young Horse Championships	Seacookie TSF	8th	CCI**
2006	World Equestrian Games	Sleep Late	1st place, gold medalist(s)	Team
2006	World Equestrian Games	Sleep Late	34th	Individual
2007	European Championships	FRH Butts Abraxxas	7th	Team
2007	European Championships	FRH Butts Abraxxas	10th	Individual
2008	Olympic Games	FRH Butts Abraxxas	1st place, gold medalist(s)	Team
2008	Olympic Games	FRH Butts Abraxxas	5th	Individual
2009	European Championships	FRH Butts Abraxxas	8th	Team
2009	European Championships	FRH Butts Abraxxas	RET	Individual
2010	World Equestrian Games	FRH Butts Abraxxas	5th	Team
2010	World Equestrian Games	FRH Butts Abraxxas	13th	Individual
2011	World Young Horse Championships	Parmenides 4	9th	CCI**
2011	World Young Horse Championships	SAP Hale Bob OLD	WD	CCI**
2011	European Championships	FRH Butts Abraxxas	1st place, gold medalist(s)	Team
2011	European Championships	FRH Butts Abraxxas	11th	Individual
2012	Olympic Games	FRH Butts Abraxxas	1st place, gold medalist(s)	Team
2012	Olympic Games	FRH Butts Abraxxas	25th	Individual
2013	European Championships	SAP Escada FRH	1st place, gold medalist(s)	Team
2013	European Championships	SAP Escada FRH	2nd place, silver medalist(s)	Individual
2014	World Young Horse Championships	Zilia D	12th	CCI**
2014	World Equestrian Games	SAP Escada FRH	1st place, gold medalist(s)	Team
2014	World Equestrian Games	SAP Escada FRH	13th	Individual
2015	World Young Horse Championships	Weisse Duene	21st	CCI*
2015	European Championships	SAP Hale Bob OLD	1st place, gold medalist(s)	Team
2015	European Championships	SAP Hale Bob OLD	5th	Individual
2016	World Young Horse Championships	Weisse Duene	1st place, gold medalist(s)	CCI**
2016	Olympic Games	SAP Hale Bob OLD	2nd place, silver medalist(s)	Team
2016	Olympic Games	SAP Hale Bob OLD	14th	Individual
2017	European Championships	SAP Hale Bob OLD	10th	Team
2017	European Championships	SAP Hale Bob OLD	1st place, gold medalist(s)	Individual
2018	World Equestrian Games	SAP Hale Bob OLD	5th	Team
2018	World Equestrian Games	SAP Hale Bob OLD	3rd place, bronze medalist(s)	Individual
2019	European Championships	SAP Hale Bob OLD	1st place, gold medalist(s)	Team
2019	European Championships	SAP Hale Bob OLD	1st place, gold medalist(s)	Individual
2019	World Young Horse Championships	Equistros Siena Just Do It	WD	CCI***
2020	World Young Horse Championships	Cascamara	1st place, gold medalist(s)	CCI**
2021	European Championships	SAP Hale Bob OLD	2nd place, silver medalist(s)	Team
2021	European Championships	SAP Hale Bob OLD	5th	Individual
EL = Eliminated; RET = Retired; WD = Withdrew

== Notable horses ==
- Sleep Late - 1991 Gray British Sport Horse Gelding (Kuwait Beach XX x Evening Trial)
  - 1999 European Championships - Individual 39th Place
  - 2000 Sydney Olympics - Team Fourth Place
  - 2004 Athens Olympics - Team Fourth Place
  - 2005 European Championships - Individual Bronze Medal
  - 2006 World Equestrian Games - Team Gold Medal
- Nector vh Carelshof - 1990 Bay Gelding
  - 2002 FEI Dressage World Cup Final - Seventh Place
- FRH Butts Abraxxas - 1997 Gray Hanoverian Gelding (Heraldik XX x Kronenkranich XX)
  - 2007 European Championships - Team Seventh Place, Individual Tenth Place
  - 2008 Beijing Olympics - Team Gold Medal, Individual Fifth Place
  - 2009 European Championships - Team Eighth Place
  - 2010 World Equestrian Games - Team Fifth Place, Individual 13th Place
  - 2011 European Championships - Team Gold Medal, Individual 11th Place
  - 2012 London Olympics - Team Gold Medal, Individual 25th Place
- SAP Escada FRH - 2004 Bay Hanoverian Mare (Embassy I x Lehnsherr)
  - 2013 European Championships - Team Gold Medal, Individual Silver Medal
  - 2014 World Equestrian Games - Team Gold Medal, Individual 13th Place
  - 2015 Luhmuhlen CCI**** Winner
- SAP Hale Bob OLD - 2004 Bay Oldenburg Gelding (Helikon XX x Noble Champion)
  - 2014 Pau CCI**** Winner
  - 2015 European Championships - Team Gold Medal, Individual Fifth Place
  - 2016 Rio Olympics - Team Silver Medal, Individual 14th Place
  - 2017 European Championships - Team Tenth Place, Individual Gold Medal
- Weisse Duene - 2009 Gray Holsteiner Mare (Clarimo x Romino)
  - 2016 FEI Eventing Young Horse World Championships - Gold Medal
