= Geoffrey Curran (equestrian) =

Irish equestrian

Geoffrey Curran (born 1980) is an Irish equestrian.

Born in the village of Fenor, Co. Waterford. He competed at the 2008 Summer Olympics in Beijing, where he placed 8th in team eventing with the Irish team. He also competed in individual eventing.
