= Austin O'Connor (equestrian) =

Irish equestrian

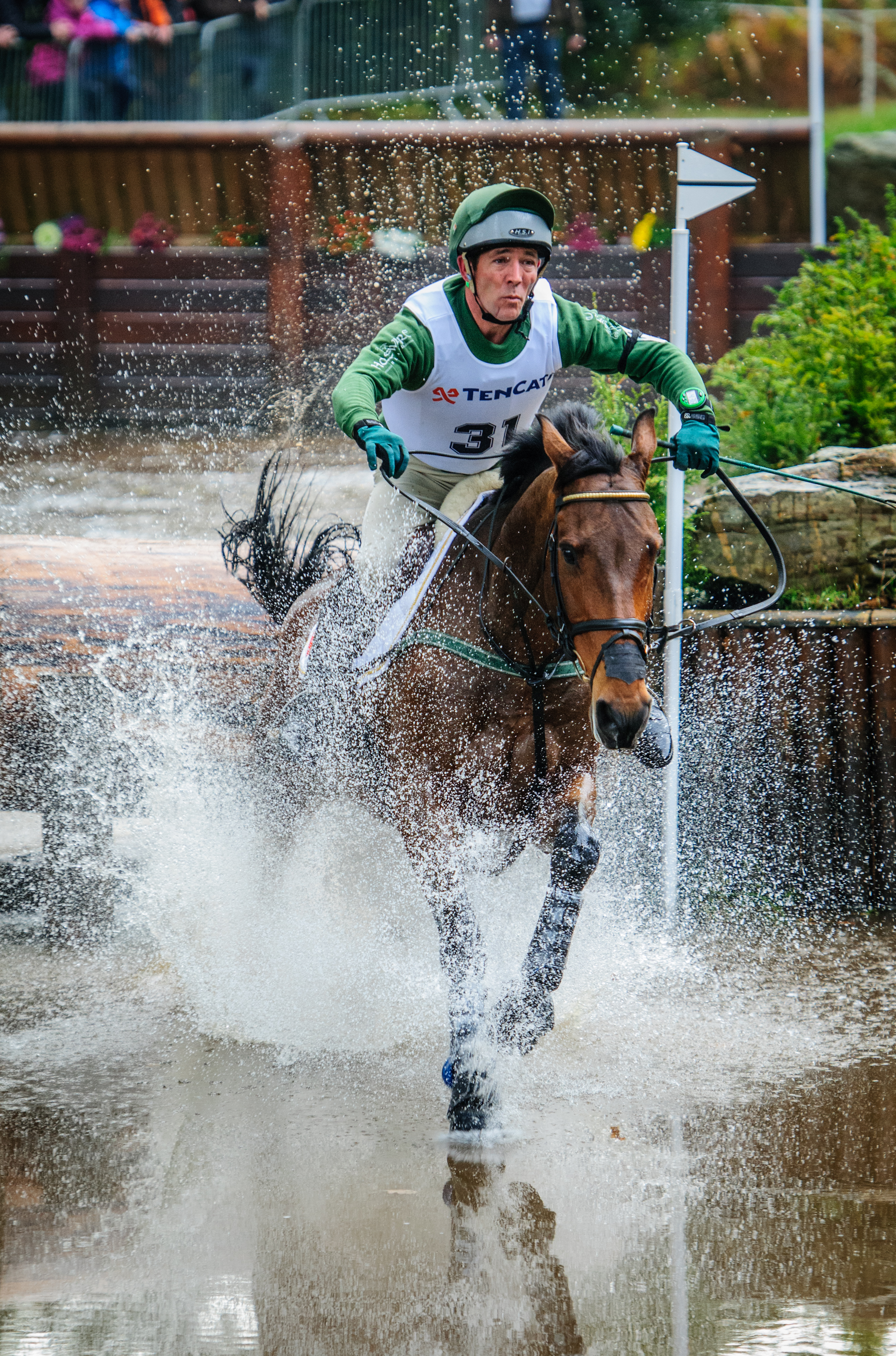
- O'Connor and Balham Houdini at Military Boekelo 2013

Personal information
- Born: 10 December 1974 (age 51) Mallow, County Cork, Ireland
- Height: 170 cm (5 ft 7 in)

Sport
- Country: Ireland
- Sport: Equestrian
- Event: Eventing

Austin O'Connor (born 10 December 1974) is an Irish equestrian.

He participated at the 2000 Summer Olympics in Sydney. He competed at the 2008 Summer Olympics in Beijing, where he placed 8th in team eventing with the Irish team. He also competed in individual eventing. He competed in the 2020 Summer Olympics. He finished 3rd at Badminton Horse Trials in 2023 and 2025 on Colorado Blue His win at the 2023 Maryland Horse Trials with Colorado Blue was the first Irish 5* win for 58 years.
