= Frank Ostholt =

German eventing rider (born 1975)

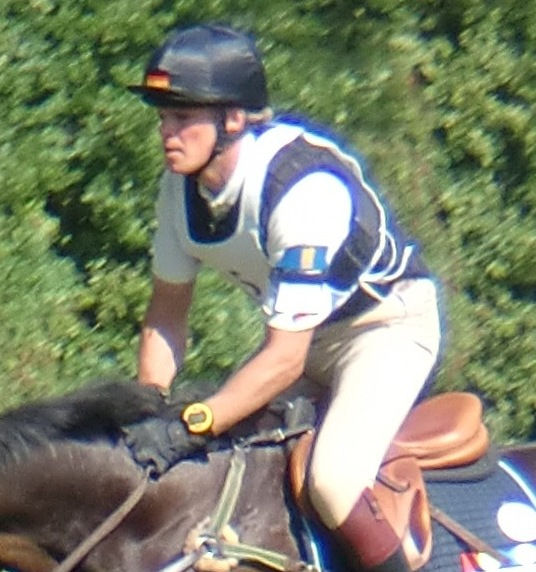
- Frank Ostholt, German Eventing Championships, CIC 3*-W Schenefeld 2010

Medal record

Representing Germany

Equestrian

Olympic Games
Gold medal – first place	2008 Beijing	Team eventing

World Championships
Gold medal – first place	2006 Aachen	Team eventing

European Championships
Bronze medal – third place	2005 Blenheim	Team eventing
Bronze medal – third place	2011 Luhmühlen	Individual eventing

Frank Ostholt (born 23 September 1975 in Warendorf, West Germany) is a German eventing rider. With his horse Mr. Medicott, he won a gold medal in team eventing at the 2008 Summer Olympics. He is married to Swedish equestrian Sara Algotsson Ostholt.

== Notable horses ==
- Air Jordan 2 - 1995 Chestnut Hanoverian Gelding (Amerigo Vespucci XX x Wittensee)
  - 2004 Athens Olympics - Team Fourth Place, Individual 24th Place
  - 2005 European Championships - Team Bronze Medal, Individual Fifth Place
  - 2006 World Equestrian Games - Team Gold Medal, Individual Fourth Place
  - 2008 FEI World Cup Final - Bronze Medal
  - 2009 FEI World Cup Final - Silver Medal
- Quite Easy 6 - 2001 Chestnut Westfalen Mare (Quattro B x Akittos XX)
  - 2007 FEI Eventing Young Horse World Championships - Gold Medal
  - 2008 FEI Eventing Young Horse World Championships - Fifteenth Place
- Mr. Medicott - 1999 Chestnut Irish Sport Horse Gelding (Cruising x Edmund Burke)
  - 2008 Beijing Olympics - Team Gold Medal, Individual 25th Place
  - 2010 World Equestrian Games - Individual 21st Place
- Sir Medicott - 2003 Bay German Warmblood Gelding (Campbell 5 x Baylis XX)
  - 2009 FEI Eventing Young Horse World Championships - Bronze Medal
- Little Paint - 1998 Bay German Warmblood Gelding (Nitron x I'm a Star XX)
  - 2011 European Championships - Individual Bronze Medal
- Jum Jum - 2010 Bay Westfalen Gelding (Jaguar Mail x Papoi's Boy XX)
  - 2017 FEI Eventing Young Horse World Championships - Ninth Place
