= Brazil at the 2008 Summer Olympics =

- IOC code: BRA
- NOC: Brazilian Olympic Committee
- Website: www.cob.org.br (in Portuguese)

in Beijing
- Competitors: 277 in 25 sports
- Flag bearers: Robert Scheidt (opening); Maurren Maggi (closing)
- Medals Ranked 23rd: Gold 3 Silver 4 Bronze 10 Total 17

Summer Olympics appearances (overview)
- 1920; 1924; 1928; 1932; 1936; 1948; 1952; 1956; 1960; 1964; 1968; 1972; 1976; 1980; 1984; 1988; 1992; 1996; 2000; 2004; 2008; 2012; 2016; 2020; 2024; 2028

Brazil sent a delegation to compete at the 2008 Summer Olympics in Beijing, China, in August 2008. Brazilian athletes have competed in every Summer Olympic Games since 1920, except the 1928 Summer Olympics. The country is represented by the Brazilian Olympic Committee (COB – Comitê Olímpico Brasileiro). Brazil headed to the Beijing Games with its largest Olympic delegation at the time, 277 athletes, including 132 women.

The 17 medals won by Brazil topped the previous medal count record set in 1996, and included the first individual medal and the first individual gold earned by women, by judoka Ketleyn Quadros and jumper Maurren Maggi, respectively. Three of the medals were gold, by Maggi, swimmer César Cielo and the female volleyball team.

Brazil won the first medal ever in taekwondo, when Natália Falavigna won the bronze medal in women's +67 kg. Brazil also won its first gold medal ever in swimming, achieved by César Cielo in men's 50 m freestyle.

== Summary ==
Brazil was the 39th nation to enter the Beijing National Stadium during the Olympic opening ceremony. Sailor Robert Scheidt (1996, 2000 and 2004 medalist) was the flag bearer at the opening ceremony.

The swimmer César Cielo was the first Brazilian swimmer to be gold medalist, when he conquered the gold medal in men's 50 m freestyle, with an Olympic record. Raised to the post of new hero of the national sport, he had previously won in Beijing the bronze medal in the 100 m freestyle a result that confirmed his position of new standout in the tests of speed of swimming.

The jumper Maurren Maggi reached 7.04m in the final of the women's long jump and surpassed, in just one centimeter, the Russian Tatyana Lebedeva. Maurren won gold and became the first Brazilian woman in history to win the gold medal, not only in Athletics but also in an individual event of any sport in the Olympic Games. Maurren Maggi, was the flag bearer at the 2008 Summer Olympics closing ceremony.

It was also in 2008 Summer Olympics that one of the most popular sports in Brazil finally saw women win Olympic gold: the volleyball. Four years earlier, in Athens, the Brazil women's national volleyball team, led by coach José Roberto Guimarães, champion with the men's team at the 1992 Barcelona Games, had been very close to the dreamy Olympic decision when, in the semifinal against Russia, got the advantage of 24/19 in the fourth set (the Brazilians led by 2 sets to 1). Incredibly, although it needed just one more point to close the match, the Brazilians allowed a spectacular turn of the Russians in the fourth set. Not only did they lose that quarter-final by 28/26, like the game after a 16/14 loss in the tie-break. They would also lose the bronze medal for the Cuba. The trauma of Athens, however, was completely erased in Beijing. With a perfect campaign of eight wins, highlighted by the statistics of only one set lost in all the tournament, Brazil was the champion by defeating the United States in the decision by 3 to 1. José Roberto Guimarães entered history as the only coach to have taken a male and a female teams Olympic gold.

The Brazil men's national volleyball team was silver medalist of the tournament, losing the gold medal match by 3 to 1 to United States. In the beach volleyball two medals were conquered in the men's tournament. Márcio Araújo and Fábio Luiz Magalhães were silver medalists, losing the gold medal match to Americans Todd Rogers and Phil Dalhausser. The bronze medal was obtained by Ricardo Santos and Emanuel Rego.

At the football the Brazil women's national football team won the silver medal. The team advanced to the final against United States and lost by 1–0 at extra time. The Brazil national under-23 football team was the bronze medalist in the men's tournament.

The sailors Robert Scheidt and Bruno Prada were silver medalists in Star class. This was Robert Scheidt's fourth of his 5 Olympic medals. Also in the sailing, Fernanda Oliveira and Isabel Swan were the bronze medalists in Women's 470 class, becoming the first Brazilian women to win an Olympic medal in sailing.

Brazilian judokas won three more podiums for Brazil. Leandro Guilheiro was the bronze medalist in men's 73 kg while Thiago Camilo won the bronze in men's 81 kg category. Ketleyn Quadros was the bronze medalist in women's 57 kg. She was the first Brazilian judoka woman to win an Olympic medal and also the first Brazilian woman to conquer a medal in an individual sport.

The taekwondo athlete Natália Falavigna won the bronze medal in women's +67 kg category. This was the first Olympic medal ever won by Brazil in the Taekwondo.

Finally two more bronze medals were awarded to Brazilian athletes, several years after the 2008 Summer Olympics, due to doping violations. Both medals were in the athletics. Originally won by Russia, the gold medal of women's 4 × 100 m relay was stripped due to anti-doping rules violation by Yulia Chermoshanskaya. Following medals reallocation, Belgium was awarded gold, Nigeria – silver and Brazil – bronze. Rosemar Coelho Neto, Lucimar de Moura, Thaissa Presti and Rosângela Santos received the bronze medals in March 2017 at the Prêmio Brasil Olímpico ceremony in Rio de Janeiro.

Jamaican team originally won gold medals in Men's 4 × 100 m relay but was disqualified due to anti-doping rules violation by Nesta Carter. The Court of Arbitration for Sport decided in 2018 that Trinidad and Tobago is the winner, the silver medal was reallocated to Japan and the bronze to Brazil team, which was formed by sprinters Vicente de Lima, Sandro Viana, Bruno de Barros and José Carlos Moreira.

== Medalists ==
Medal	Name	Sport	Event	Date
Gold	César Cielo	Swimming	Men's 50 m freestyle	August 16
Gold	Maurren Maggi	Athletics	Women's long jump	August 22
Gold	Brazil women's national volleyball team: Walewska Oliveira; Carolina Albuquerque; Marianne Steinbrecher; Paula Pequeno; Thaísa Menezes; Hélia Souza; Valeska Menezes; Fabiana Claudino; Wélissa Gonzaga; Jaqueline Carvalho; Sheilla Castro; Fabiana Alvim	Volleyball	Women's tournament	August 23
Silver	Robert Scheidt; Bruno Prada	Sailing	Star class	August 21
Silver	Brazil women's national football team: Andréia Suntaque; Bárbara Barbosa; Renata Costa; Cristiane Rozeira; Daniela Lima; Érika Santos; Ester Santos; Fabiana Simões; Formiga; Francielle Alberto; Marta Silva; Maurine Gonçalves; Maycon; Pretinha; Andréia Andrade; Rosana Augusto; Simone Jatobá; Tânia Ribeiro	Football	Women's tournament	August 21
Silver	Márcio Araújo; Fábio Luiz Magalhães	Volleyball	Men's beach volleyball	August 22
Silver	Brazil men's national volleyball team: Dante Amaral; Marcelo Elgarten; Gustavo Endres; Bruno Rezende; Gilberto Godoy Filho; André Heller; Murilo Endres; André Nascimento; Anderson Rodrigues; Samuel Fuchs; Sergio Dutra Santos; Rodrigo Santana	Volleyball	Men's tournament	August 24
Bronze	Leandro Guilheiro	Judo	Men's 73 kg	August 11
Bronze	Ketleyn Quadros	Judo	Women's 57 kg	August 11
Bronze	Tiago Camilo	Judo	Men's 81 kg	August 12
Bronze	César Cielo	Swimming	Men's 100 m freestyle	August 14
Bronze	Fernanda Oliveira; Isabel Swan	Sailing	Women's 470 class	August 18
Bronze	Ricardo Santos; Emanuel Rego	Volleyball	Men's beach volleyball	August 22
Bronze	Brazil U-23 national football team: Diego Alves; Anderson Oliveira; Breno Borges; Diego Ribas; Hernanes Lima; Ilsinho; Jô; Lucas Leiva; Marcelo Silva Júnior; Thiago Neves; Alexandre Pato; Rafinha; Ramires Nascimento; Renan Soares; Ronaldinho; Alex Silva; Thiago Silva; Rafael Sóbis	Football	Men's tournament	August 22
Bronze	Rosemar Coelho Neto; Lucimar de Moura; Thaissa Presti; Rosângela Santos	Athletics	Women's 4 × 100 m relay	August 22
Bronze	Vicente de Lima; Sandro Viana; Bruno de Barros; José Carlos Moreira	Athletics	Men's 4 × 100 m relay	August 22
Bronze	Natália Falavigna	Taekwondo	Women's +67 kg	August 23

Medals by sport
Sport	1st place, gold medalist(s)	2nd place, silver medalist(s)	3rd place, bronze medalist(s)	Total
Volleyball	1	2	1	4
Athletics	1	0	2	3
Swimming	1	0	1	2
Football	0	1	1	2
Sailing	0	1	1	2
Judo	0	0	3	3
Taekwondo	0	0	1	1
Total	3	4	10	17

Medals by date
Date	1st place, gold medalist(s)	2nd place, silver medalist(s)	3rd place, bronze medalist(s)	Total
9 Aug	0	0	0	0
10 Aug	0	0	0	0
11 Aug	0	0	2	2
12 Aug	0	0	1	1
13 Aug	0	0	0	0
14 Aug	0	0	1	1
15 Aug	0	0	0	0
16 Aug	1	0	0	1
17 Aug	0	0	0	0
18 Aug	0	0	1	1
19 Aug	0	0	0	0
20 Aug	0	0	0	0
21 Aug	0	2	0	2
22 Aug	1	1	4	6
23 Aug	1	0	1	2
24 Aug	0	1	0	1
Total	3	4	10	17

Medals by gender
Gender	1st place, gold medalist(s)	2nd place, silver medalist(s)	3rd place, bronze medalist(s)	Total
Male	1	3	6	10
Female	2	1	4	7
Mixed	0	0	0	0
Total	3	4	10	17

=== Multiple medallist ===
The following competitor won several medals at the 2008 Olympic Games.

Name	Medal	Sport	Event
César Cielo	Gold; Bronze	Swimming	Men's 50 metre freestyle Men's 100 metre freestyle

== Archery ==
Luiz Trainini qualified by placing third at the Pan American Continental Qualification Tournament, held in San Salvador, El Salvador, October 2007.

Athlete	Event	Ranking round		Round of 64	Round of 32	Round of 16	Quarterfinals	Semifinals	Final / BM	
Athlete	Event	Score	Seed	Opposition Score	Opposition Score	Opposition Score	Opposition Score	Opposition Score	Opposition Score	Rank
Luiz Trainini	Men's individual	610	61	Park K-M (KOR) (4); L 99–116	Did not advance					

== Athletics ==
Key

- Note–Ranks given for track events are within the athlete's heat only
- Q = Qualified for the next round
- NR = National record
- N/A = Round not applicable for the event
- Bye = Athlete not required to compete in round

Men
Track & road events

Athlete	Event	Heat		Quarterfinal		Semifinal		Final	
Athlete	Event	Result	Rank	Result	Rank	Result	Rank	Result	Rank
Vicente de Lima	100 m	10.26	3 Q	10.31	7	Did not advance			
José Carlos Moreira	100 m	10.29	3 Q	10.32	6	Did not advance			
Sandro Viana	100 m	10.60	6	Did not advance					
Sandro Viana	200 m	20.84	4 Q	21.07	7	Did not advance			
Bruno de Barros	200 m	21.15	5	Did not advance					
Fernando de Almeida	400 m	46.60	5	—N/a		Did not advance			
Kléberson Davide	800 m	1:48.53	5	—N/a		Did not advance			
Fabiano Peçanha	800 m	1:46.54	4	—N/a		Did not advance			
Hudson de Souza	1500 m	3:37.06	7	—N/a		Did not advance			
Anselmo da Silva	110 m hurdles	13.81	4 Q	13.84	7	Did not advance			
Mahau Suguimati	400 m hurdles	49.45	3 Q	50.16	7	Did not advance			
José Alessandro Bagio	20 km walk	—N/a						1:21:43	14
Mário dos Santos	50 km walk	—N/a						4:10:25	41
Franck Caldeira	Marathon	—N/a						DNF	
José Teles	Marathon	—N/a						2:20:25	38
Marílson dos Santos	Marathon	—N/a						DNF	
Bruno de Barros; Vicente de Lima; José Carlos Moreira; Sandro Viana	4 × 100 m relay	39.01	4 Q	—N/a				38.24	3rd place, bronze medalist(s)

Field events

Athlete	Event	Qualification		Final	
Athlete	Event	Distance	Position	Distance	Position
Fábio Gomes da Silva	Pole vault	5.45	=25	Did not advance	
Mauro Vinícius da Silva	Long jump	7.75	26	Did not advance	
Jessé de Lima	High jump	2.29	=1 Q	2.20	=10
Jadel Gregório	Triple jump	17.15	9 Q	17.20	6
Jefferson Sabino	Triple jump	16.45	28	Did not advance	

Combined events – Decathlon

Athlete	Event	100 m	LJ	SP	HJ	400 m	110H	DT	PV	JT	1500 m	Final	Rank
Carlos Chinin	Result	10.99	6.94	NM	1.99	49.21	DNS	—	—	—	—	DNF	
Carlos Chinin	Points	863	799	0	794	851	0	—	—	—	—	DNF	

Women
Track & road events

Athlete	Event	Heat		Quarterfinal		Semifinal		Final	
Athlete	Event	Result	Rank	Result	Rank	Result	Rank	Result	Rank
Lucimar de Moura	100 m	11.60	4 Q	11.67	8	Did not advance			
Evelyn dos Santos	200 m	23.40	5	Did not advance					
Maria Laura Almirão	400 m	53.26	5	—N/a		Did not advance			
Zenaide Vieira	3000 m steeplechase	DNF		—N/a				Did not advance	
Maíla Machado	100 m hurdles	13.45	7	—N/a		Did not advance			
Lucimar Teodoro	400 m hurdles	57.68	6	—N/a		Did not advance			
Tânia Spindler	20 km walk	—N/a						1:36:46	37
Marily dos Santos	Marathon	—N/a						2:38:10	51
Lucimar de Moura; Rosemar Coelho Neto; Thaissa Presti; Rosângela Santos	4 × 100 m relay	43.38	3 Q	—N/a				43.14	3rd place, bronze medalist(s)
Maria Laura Almirão; Emmily Pinheiro; Lucimar Teodoro; Josiane Tito	4 × 400 m relay	3:30.10	6	—N/a				Did not advance	

Field events

Athlete	Event	Qualification		Final	
Athlete	Event	Distance	Position	Distance	Position
Elisângela Adriano	Discus throw	58.84	19	Did not advance	
Keila Costa	Long jump	6.62	8 Q	6.43	11
Maurren Maggi	Long jump	6.79	2 Q	7.04	1st place, gold medalist(s)
Gisele de Oliveira	Triple jump	13.81	23	Did not advance	
Fabiana Murer	Pole vault	4.50	=2 Q	4.45	10
Alessandra Resende	Javelin throw	56.53	27	Did not advance	

Combined events – Heptathlon

Athlete	Event	100H	HJ	SP	200 m	LJ	JT	800 m	Final	Rank
Lucimara da Silva	Result	13.55	1.83	11.59	24.56	6.18	40.34	2:16.20	6076	17*
Lucimara da Silva	Points	1043	1016	634	928	905	674	876	6076	17*

* The athlete who finished in second place, Lyudmila Blonska of Ukraine, tested positive for a banned substance. Both the A and the B tests were positive, therefore Blonska was stripped of her silver medal, and da Silva moved up a position.

== Basketball ==
Summary

Team	Event	Group Stage						Quarterfinal	Semifinal	Final / BM	
Team	Event	Opposition Score	Opposition Score	Opposition Score	Opposition Score	Opposition Score	Rank	Opposition Score	Opposition Score	Opposition Score	Rank
Brazil women's	Women's tournament	South Korea; L 62–68	Australia; L 65–80	Latvia; L 78–79	Russia; L 64–74	Belarus; W 68–53	6	Did not advance			

=== Women's tournament ===
Roster

The following is the Brazil roster in the women's basketball tournament of the 2008 Summer Olympics.

Brazil women's national basketball team – 2008 Summer Olympics roster
Players
Coaches

Pos.	No.	Name	Age – Date of birth	Height	Club	Ctr.
G	4	Adriana Moisés Pinto	30 – June 12, 1978	5 ft 7 in (1.7 m)	ŽKK Gospić	(Croatia)
SG	5	Karla Costa	29 – September 25, 1978	5 ft 8 in (1.73 m)	Catanduva Basket Clube	(Brazil)
G/F	6	Karen Gustavo Rocha	24 – March 4, 1984	5 ft 9 in (1.75 m)	Ourinhos Basquete	(Brazil)
F	7	Micaela Martins Jacintho	29 – June 12, 1979	5 ft 11 in (1.8 m)	Ourinhos Basquete	(Brazil)
G	8	Fernanda Neves Beling	25 – December 5, 1982	6 ft 0 in (1.83 m)	Americana Basketball	(Brazil)
PG	9	Cláudia das Neves (C)	33 – February 17, 1975	5 ft 7 in (1.7 m)	Stade Clermontois BA	(France)
F/C	10	Jucimara Evangelista Dantas	30 – February 4, 1978	6 ft 3 in (1.91 m)	ESB Villeneuve-d'Ascq	(France)
F/C	11	Soeli Garvão Zakrzeski	30 – November 12, 1977	6 ft 2 in (1.88 m)	CDB Zaragoza	(Spain)
F	12	Patrícia Ferreira	29 – March 21, 1979	5 ft 11 in (1.8 m)	Ourinhos Basquete	(Brazil)
C	13	Franciele Nascimento	30 – October 19, 1977	6 ft 3 in (1.91 m)	Rivas Futura	(Spain)
C	14	Graziane de Jesus Coelho	25 – January 18, 1983	6 ft 3 in (1.91 m)	MiZo Pécs 2010	(Hungary)
C	15	Kelly Santos	28 – November 10, 1979	6 ft 4 in (1.93 m)	Seattle Storm	(United States)

Head coach

- (Brazil) Paulo Bassul

Legend

- (C) Team captain
- Club – describes last
  club before the tournament
- Age – describes age
  on August 9, 2008

Group play

Pos	Team	Pld	W	L	PF	PA	PD	Pts	Qualification
1	Australia	5	5	0	424	319	+105	10	Quarterfinals
2	Russia	5	4	1	339	333	+6	9	Quarterfinals
3	Belarus	5	2	3	324	332	−8	7 (Note: Head-to-head record: Belarus 1–0 South Korea)	Quarterfinals
4	South Korea	5	2	3	327	360	−33	7	Quarterfinals
5	Latvia	5	1	4	334	387	−53	6 (Note: Head-to-head record: Latvia 1–0 Brazil)	
6	Brazil	5	1	4	337	354	−17	6	

Source: FIBA archive
Rules for classification: 1) points; 2) head-to-head points; 3) head-to-head goal average; 4) head-to-head number of points scored.
Notes:

9 August 2008
16:45

Report

South Korea	68–62 (OT)	Brazil
Scoring by quarter: 13–14, 13–14, 15–15, 14–12, Overtime: 13–7
Pts: Beon 19, Choi 19; Rebs: Jung 8 Asts: Jung 5		Pts: Santos 13; Rebs: Nascimento 12; Asts: Jacintho 3

Wukesong Indoor Stadium, Beijing
Attendance: 11,083
Referees: Fabio Facchini (ITA)

11 August 2008
22:15

Report

Australia	80–65	Brazil
Scoring by quarter: 29–14, 21–15, 11–20, 19–16
Pts: Summerton 18; Rebs: Taylor 8 Asts: Harrower 5		Pts: Santos 21; Rebs: Santos 10; Asts: Santos 3

Wukesong Indoor Stadium, Beijing
Attendance: 11,083
Referees: Nikolaos Pitsilkas (GRE)

13 August 2008
14:30

Report

Brazil	78–79	Latvia
Scoring by quarter: 23–14, 13–17, 23–26, 19–22
Pts: Zakrzeski 16; Rebs: Santos, Zakrzeski 9 Asts: Pinto 4		Pts: Jēkabsone 25; Rebs: Kubliņa 7 Asts: Jēkabsone 5

Wukesong Indoor Stadium, Beijing
Attendance: 11,083
Referees: Reynaldo Mercedes (DOM)

15 August 2008
14:30

Report

Russia	74–64	Brazil
Scoring by quarter: 21–26, 14–15, 19–15, 20–8
Pts: Shchegoleva 14; Rebs: Korstin 10; Asts: Korstin 5		Pts: Pinto 21; Rebs: Zakrzeski 5 Asts: Pinto 6

Wukesong Indoor Stadium, Beijing
Attendance: 11,083
Referees: Luigi Lamonica (ITA)

17 August 2008
16:45

Report

Brazil	68–53	Belarus
Scoring by quarter: 20–12, 19–14, 10–12, 19–15
Pts: Santos 14; Rebs: Nascimento 10; Asts: Nascimento 3		Pts: Anufryienka, Leuchanka 10; Rebs: Verameyenka 10; Asts: Marchanka 4

Wukesong Indoor Stadium, Beijing
Attendance: 11,083
Referees: Juan Arteaga (ESP)

== Boxing ==
Athlete	Event	Round of 32	Round of 16	Quarterfinals	Semifinals	Final	
Athlete	Event	Opposition Result	Opposition Result	Opposition Result	Opposition Result	Opposition Result	Rank
Paulo Carvalho	Light flyweight	Bouchtouk (MAR); W 13–7	Plange (GHA); W 21–12	Hernández (CUB); L 6–21	Did not advance		
Robenílson de Jesus	Flyweight	Rathnayake (SRI); W 13–3	Yunusov (TJK); L 6–12	Did not advance			
Robson Conceição	Featherweight	Li Y (CHN); L 4–12	Did not advance				
Éverton Lopes	Lightweight	Talasbayev (KGZ); L 7–9	Did not advance				
Myke Carvalho	Light welterweight	Colin (MRI); L 11–15	Did not advance				
Washington Silva	Light heavyweight	Augustama (HAI); W 6–2	B Samir (GHA); W 9–7	Egan (IRL); L 0–8	Did not advance		

== Canoeing ==
=== Slalom ===
Women

Athlete	Event	Preliminary						Semifinal		Final			
Athlete	Event	Run 1	Rank	Run 2	Rank	Total	Rank	Time	Rank	Time	Rank	Total	Rank
Poliana de Paula	Women's K-1	113.47	16	110.72	17	224.19	14 Q	168.29	14	Did not advance			

=== Sprint ===
Men

Athlete	Event	Heats		Semifinals		Final	
Athlete	Event	Time	Rank	Time	Rank	Time	Rank
Nivalter Santos	Men's C-1 500 m	1:51.363	6 QS	1:56.139	7	Did not advance	
Nivalter Santos	Men's C-1 1000 m	4:17.407	6 QS	4:12.556	7	Did not advance	

Qualification Legend: QS = Qualify to semi-final; QF = Qualify directly to final

== Cycling ==
=== Road ===
Men

Athlete	Event	Time	Rank
Murilo Fischer	Men's road race	6:26:17	20
Luciano Pagliarini	Men's road race	7:08:27	90

Women

Athlete	Event	Time	Rank
Clemilda Fernandes	Women's road race	3:41:01	51

=== Mountain biking ===
Men

Athlete	Event	Time	Rank
Rubens Donizete	Men's cross-country	2:05:19	21

Men

Athlete	Event	Time	Rank
Jaqueline Mourão	Women's cross-country	LAP (1 lap)	19

== Diving ==
César Castro qualified a spot to Brazil at the FINA World Championship, while Cassius Duran, Juliana Veloso and Hugo Parisi qualified at the FINA Diving World Cup.

Men

Athlete	Event	Preliminaries		Semifinals		Final	
Athlete	Event	Points	Rank	Points	Rank	Points	Rank
César Castro	3 m springboard	400.60	24	Did not advance			
Cassius Duran	10 m platform	389.65	24	Did not advance			
Hugo Parisi	10 m platform	412.95	19	Did not advance			

Women

Athlete	Event	Preliminaries		Semifinals		Final	
Athlete	Event	Points	Rank	Points	Rank	Points	Rank
Juliana Veloso	10 m platform	283.75	23	Did not advance			

== Equestrian ==
The dressage and eventing teams qualified by taking bronze medals at the team Competition at the 2007 Pan American Games, while the jumping team qualified by taking the gold medal at the team Competition at the 2007 Pan American Games.

=== Dressage ===
Athlete	Horse	Event	Grand Prix		Grand Prix Special		Grand Prix Freestyle		Overall	
Athlete	Horse	Event	Score	Rank	Score	Rank	Score	Rank	Score	Rank
Leandro Silva	Oceano Do Top	Individual	60.125	23	Did not advance					
Luiza Almeida	Samba	Individual	60.833	40	Did not advance					

=== Eventing ===
Athlete	Horse	Event	Dressage		Cross-country			Jumping						Total	
Athlete	Horse	Event	Dressage		Cross-country			Qualifier			Final			Total	
Athlete	Horse	Event	Penalties	Rank	Penalties	Total	Rank	Penalties	Total	Rank	Penalties	Total	Rank	Penalties	Rank
Jeferson Moreira	Escudeiro	Individual	55.90	51	50.80	106.70	45	4.00	110.70	40	Did not advance			110.70	39
André Paro	Land Heir	Individual	59.60	57	39.20	98.80	43	35.00	133.80	48	Did not advance			133.80	47
Marcelo Tosi	Super Rocky	Individual	64.80	63	24.80	89.60	37	0.00	89.60	28 Q	0.00	89.60	22	89.60	22
Saulo Tristão	Totsie	Individual	79.60 #	69	Eliminated			Did not advance							
Jeferson Moreira; André Paro; Marcelo Tosi; Saulo Tristão	See above	Team	180.30	11	114.80	295.10	10	39.00	334.10	10	—N/a			334.10	10

# – Indicates that points do not count in team total

=== Show jumping ===
Athlete	Horse	Event	Qualification								Final					Total	
Athlete	Horse	Event	Round 1		Round 2			Round 3			Round A		Round B			Total	
Athlete	Horse	Event	Penalties	Rank	Penalties	Total	Rank	Penalties	Total	Rank	Penalties	Rank	Penalties	Total	Rank	Penalties	Rank
Bernardo Alves	Chupa Chup	Individual	0	=1 Q	12	12	30 Q	20	32	27	Did not advance					32	27
Camila Benedicto	Bonito Z	Individual	5	39 Q	13	18	40 Q	9	27	38 Q	0	=1 Q	8	8	14	8	10
Rodrigo Pessoa	Rufus	Individual	1	=14 Q	0	1	3 Q	7	8	7 Q	4	11 Q	0	4	=3	~~4~~	DSQ*
Pedro Veniss	Un Blanc de Blancs	Individual	0	=1 Q	Eliminated			Did not advance									
Bernardo Alves; Camila Benedicto; Rodrigo Pessoa; Pedro Veniss	See above	Team	—N/a								25	10	Did not advance			~~25~~	DSQ*

* Pessoa was disqualified after his horse Rufus was tested positive of Nonivamide; thus, all of his scores, both individual and team, had dropped towards last place.

== Fencing ==
Men

Athlete	Event	Round of 64	Round of 32	Round of 16	Quarterfinal	Semifinal	Final / BM	
Athlete	Event	Opposition Score	Opposition Score	Opposition Score	Opposition Score	Opposition Score	Opposition Score	Rank
João Souza	Individual foil	—N/a	Ota (JPN); L 4–15	Did not advance				
Renzo Agresta	Individual sabre	Samir (EGY); W 15–10	Tarantino (ITA); L 8–15	Did not advance				

== Football ==
Summary

Key:

- A.E.T – After extra time.
- P – Match decided by penalty-shootout.

Team	Event	Group Stage				Quarterfinal	Semifinal	Final / BM	
Team	Event	Opposition Score	Opposition Score	Opposition Score	Rank	Opposition Score	Opposition Score	Opposition Score	Rank
Brazil men's	Men's tournament	Belgium; W 1–0	New Zealand; W 5–0	China; W 3–0	1 Q	Cameroon; W 2–0 (a.e.t.)	Argentina; L 3–0	Belgium w 3–0	3rd place, bronze medalist(s)
Brazil women's	Women's tournament	Germany; D 0–0	North Korea; W 2–1	Nigeria; W 3–1	1 Q	Norway; W 2–1	Germany; W 4–1	United States; L 0–1 (a.e.t.)	2nd place, silver medalist(s)

=== Men's tournament ===
Brazil qualified by winning the 2007 South American Youth Championship.

- Men's team event – 1 team of 18 players

Roster

The following is the Brazil squad in the men's football tournament of the 2008 Summer Olympics.

Head coach: Dunga

No.	Pos.	Player	Date of birth (age)	Caps	Goals	Club
1	GK	Diego Alves	24 June 1985 (aged 23)	1	0	(Royal Spanish Football Federation) Almería
2	DF	Rafinha	7 September 1985 (aged 22)	1	0	(German Football Association) Schalke 04
3	DF	Alex Silva	10 March 1985 (aged 23)	1	0	(Brazilian Football Confederation) São Paulo
4	DF	Thiago Silva*	22 September 1984 (aged 23)	0	0	(Brazilian Football Confederation) Fluminense
5	MF	Hernanes	29 May 1985 (aged 23)	1	0	(Brazilian Football Confederation) São Paulo
6	DF	Marcelo	12 May 1988 (aged 20)	0	0	(Royal Spanish Football Federation) Real Madrid
7	MF	Anderson	13 April 1988 (aged 20)	0	0	(The Football Association) Manchester United
8	MF	Lucas	9 January 1987 (aged 21)	1	0	(The Football Association) Liverpool
9	FW	Alexandre Pato	2 September 1989 (aged 18)	2	1	(Italian Football Federation) Milan
10	MF	Ronaldinho* (c)	21 March 1980 (aged 28)	19	15	(Italian Football Federation) Milan
11	MF	Ramires	24 March 1987 (aged 21)	2	0	(Brazilian Football Confederation) Cruzeiro
12	GK	Renan	24 January 1985 (aged 23)	2	0	(Brazilian Football Confederation) Internacional
13	DF	Ilsinho	12 October 1985 (aged 22)	0	0	(Ukrainian Association of Football) Shakhtar Donetsk
14	DF	Breno	13 October 1989 (aged 18)	2	0	(German Football Association) Bayern Munich
15	MF	Diego	28 February 1985 (aged 23)	13	5	(German Football Association) Werder Bremen
16	MF	Thiago Neves	27 February 1985 (aged 23)	1	0	(Brazilian Football Confederation) Fluminense
17	FW	Rafael Sóbis	17 June 1985 (aged 23)	1	0	(Royal Spanish Football Federation) Real Betis
18	FW	Jô	20 March 1987 (aged 21)	0	0	(The Football Association) Manchester City

* Over-aged player.

Group play

Pos	Team	Pld	W	D	L	GF	GA	GD	Pts	Qualification
1	Brazil	3	3	0	0	9	0	+9	9	Qualified for the quarterfinals
2	Belgium	3	2	0	1	3	1	+2	6	Qualified for the quarterfinals
3	China (H)	3	0	1	2	1	6	−5	1	
4	New Zealand	3	0	1	2	1	7	−6	1	

(H) Hosts
7 August 2008
17:00

Brazil	1–0	Belgium
Hernanes 79'	Report

Shenyang Olympic Stadium, Shenyang
Attendance: 39,661
Referee: Khalil Al Ghamdi (Saudi Arabia)
10 August 2008
17:00

New Zealand	0–5	Brazil
	Report	Anderson 3'; Pato 33'; Ronaldinho 55', 61' (pen.); Sóbis 90+3'

Shenyang Olympic Stadium, Shenyang
Attendance: 44,951
Referee: Stéphane Lannoy (France)
13 August 2008
19:45

China	0–3	Brazil
	Report	Diego 18'; Thiago Neves 69', 73'

Qinhuangdao Olympic Sports Center Stadium, Qinhuangdao
Attendance: 38,790
Referee: Jerome Damon (South Africa)

Quarterfinals

16 August 2008
18:00

Brazil	2–0 (a.e.t.)	Cameroon
Sóbis 101'; Marcelo 105'	Report

Shenyang Olympic Stadium, Shenyang
Attendance: 41,043
Referee: Damir Skomina (Slovenia)

Semifinals

19 August 2008
21:00

Argentina	3–0	Brazil
Agüero 52', 58'; Riquelme 76' (pen.)	Report

Beijing Workers' Stadium, Beijing
Attendance: 52,968
Referee: Martín Vázquez (Uruguay)

Bronze medal game

22 August 2008
19:00

Belgium	0–3	Brazil (bronze)
	Report	Diego 27'; Jô 45', 90+2'

Shanghai Stadium, Shanghai
Attendance: 50,705
Referee: Thomas Einwaller (Austria)

Final rank

Bronze

=== Women's tournament ===
Brazil women's national football team is in Group B with Korea DPR, Germany and Nigeria. Brazil (CONMEBOL runner-up, second in the 2006 Sudamericano Femenino) qualified by defeating Ghana (CAF runner-up, second in the qualifying tournament).

- Women's team event – 1 team of 18 players

Roster

Head coach: Jorge Barcellos

Brazil named a squad of 18 players and 4 alternates for the tournament.

No.	Pos.	Player	Date of birth (age)	Caps	Goals	Club
1	GK	Andréia	14 September 1977 (aged 30)		0	(Royal Spanish Football Federation) Prainsa Zaragoza
2	DF	Simone	10 February 1981 (aged 27)		1	(French Football Federation) Olympique Lyonnais
3	DF	Andréia Rosa	8 July 1984 (aged 24)		0	(Brazilian Football Confederation) Ferroviária Araraquara
4	DF	Tânia (captain)	10 March 1974 (aged 34)		1	(Brazilian Football Confederation) Saad
5	DF	Renata Costa	8 July 1986 (aged 22)		1	(Danish Football Association) Odense
6	MF	Maycon	3 April 1977 (aged 31)		2	(Brazilian Football Confederation) Saad
7	MF	Daniela	12 January 1984 (aged 24)		4	(Swedish Football Association) Linköpings FC
8	MF	Formiga	3 March 1978 (aged 30)		4	(Brazilian Football Confederation) Saad
9	MF	Ester	9 February 1982 (aged 26)		1	(Brazilian Football Confederation) Santos F.C.
10	FW	Marta	19 February 1986 (aged 22)		24	(Swedish Football Association) Umeå IK
11	FW	Cristiane	15 May 1985 (aged 23)		10	(Swedish Football Association) Linköpings FC
12	GK	Bárbara	4 July 1988 (aged 20)		0	(Brazilian Football Confederation) Sport Recife
13	MF	Francielle	18 October 1989 (aged 18)		1	(Brazilian Football Confederation) Santos F.C.
14	FW	Pretinha	19 May 1975 (aged 33)		14	(Japan Football Association) INAC Leonissa
15	FW	Fabiana	4 August 1989 (aged 19)		1	(Brazilian Football Confederation) Corinthians
16	DF	Érika	4 February 1988 (aged 20)		9	(Brazilian Football Confederation) Santos F.C.
17	FW	Maurine	14 January 1986 (aged 22)		2	(Brazilian Football Confederation) Santos F.C.
18	DF	Rosana	7 July 1982 (aged 26)		3	(Austrian Football Association) SV Neulengbach

Group play

Pos	Team	Pld	W	D	L	GF	GA	GD	Pts	Qualification
1	Brazil	3	2	1	0	5	2	+3	7	Qualified for the quarterfinals
2	Germany	3	2	1	0	2	0	+2	7	Qualified for the quarterfinals
3	North Korea	3	1	0	2	2	3	−1	3	
4	Nigeria	3	0	0	3	1	5	−4	0	

6 August 2008
17:00

Germany	0–0	Brazil
	Report

Shenyang Olympic Stadium, Shenyang
Attendance: 20,703
Referee: Kari Seitz (USA)
9 August 2008
19:45

Brazil	2–1	North Korea
Daniela 14'; Marta 23'	Report	Ri Kum-suk 90'

Shenyang Olympic Stadium, Shenyang
Attendance: 19,616
Referee: Niu Huijun (China)
12 August 2008
17:00

Nigeria	1–3	Brazil
Nkwocha 19' (pen.)	Report	Cristiane 34', 35', 45+3'

Beijing Workers' Stadium, Beijing
Attendance: 51,112
Referee: Hong Eun-ah (Korea Republic)

Quarterfinals

15 August 2008
18:00

Brazil	2–1	Norway
Daniela 43'; Marta 57'	Report	S. Nordby 83' (pen.)

Tianjin Olympic Center Stadium, Tianjin
Attendance: 26,174
Referee: Kari Seitz (USA)

Semifinals

18 August 2008
18:00

Brazil	4–1	Germany
Formiga 43'; Cristiane 49', 76'; Marta 53'	Report	Prinz 10'

Shanghai Stadium, Shanghai
Attendance: 26,976
Referee: Hong Eun-ah (Korea Republic)

Gold medal game

21 August 2008
21:00

(silver) Brazil	0–1 (a.e.t.)	United States (gold)
	Report	Lloyd 96'

Beijing Workers' Stadium, Beijing
Attendance: 51,612
Referee: Dagmar Damkova (Czech Republic)

Final rank

Silver

== Gymnastics ==
=== Artistic ===
Diego Hypólito qualified by placing 17th at the 2007 World Artistic Gymnastics Championships in the men's team all-around competition, and the women's team qualified by placing 5th at the 2007 World Artistic Gymnastics Championships in the women's team all-around competition.

Men

Athlete	Event	Qualification								Final							
Athlete	Event	Apparatus						Total	Rank	Apparatus						Total	Rank
Athlete	Event	F	PH	R	V	PB	HB	Total	Rank	F	PH	R	V	PB	HB	Total	Rank
Diego Hypólito	Floor	15.950	—N/a					15.950	1 Q	15.200	—N/a					15.200	6
Diego Hypólito	Vault	—N/a			16.100	—N/a		16.100	=25	Did not advance							

Women
Team

Athlete	Event	Qualification						Final					
Athlete	Event	Apparatus				Total	Rank	Apparatus				Total	Rank
Athlete	Event	F	V	UB	BB	Total	Rank	F	V	UB	BB	Total	Rank
Jade Barbosa	Team	14.900	15.100 Q	14.800	14.700	59.500	12 Q	14.325	15.025	14.725	15.300	—N/a	
Daiane dos Santos	Team	15.275 Q	14.800	—N/a				15.275	14.675	—N/a			
Ethiene Franco	Team	14.275	14.175	14.100	14.400	56.950	36	—N/a			13.675	—N/a	
Daniele Hypólito	Team	14.250	—N/a	14.300	14.000	—N/a		—N/a		14.625	14.925	—N/a	
Ana Cláudia Silva	Team	14.800	14.750	14.550	13.475	57.575	28 Q	13.375	—N/a				
Laís Souza	Team	—N/a	14.800	14.775	13.575	—N/a		—N/a	14.600	14.350	—N/a		
Total	Team	59.250	59.450	58.425	56.675	233.800	7 Q	42.975	44.300	43.700	43.900	174.875	8

Individual finals

Athlete	Event	Apparatus				Total	Rank
Athlete	Event	F	V	UB	BB	Total	Rank
Jade Barbosa	All-around	13.950	15.025	15.075	15.500	59.550	10
Jade Barbosa	Vault	—N/a	14.487	—N/a		14.487	7
Daiane dos Santos	Floor	14.975	—N/a			14.975	6
Ana Cláudia Silva	All-around	14.350	14.175	14.175	14.175	56.875	22

=== Rhythmic ===
A group qualified by placing 11th at the 2007 World Rhythmic Gymnastics Championships in the group all-around competition.

Athlete	Event	Qualification				Final			
Athlete	Event	5 ropes	3 hoops 2 clubs	Total	Rank	5 ropes	3 hoops 2 clubs	Total	Rank
Luana Faro; Daniela Leite; Tayanne Mantovaneli; Luisa Matsuo; Marcela Menezes; Nicole Muller	Team	14.900	14.225	29.125	12	Did not advance			

== Handball ==
Brazil has qualified for both the men's and women's events by winning the 2007 Pan American Games.

- Men's team event – 1 team of 14 players
- Women's team event – 1 team of 14 players

Summary

Key:

- ET: After Extra Time
- P – Match decided by penalty-shootout.

Team	Event	Group Stage						Quarterfinal	Semifinal	Final / BM	
Team	Event	Opposition Score	Opposition Score	Opposition Score	Opposition Score	Opposition Score	Rank	Opposition Score	Opposition Score	Opposition Score	Rank
Brazil men's	Men's tournament	France; L 26–34	Croatia; L 33–14	Poland; L 25–28	China; W 29–22	Spain; L 35–36	5	Did not advance			11
Brazil women's	Women's tournament	Germany; L 22–24	Hungary; D 28–28	Russia; L 19–28	South Korea; W 33–32	Sweden; L 22–25	5	Did not advance			9

=== Men's tournament ===
Roster

The following is the Brazil roster in the men's handball tournament of the 2008 Summer Olympics.

Head coach: (Spain) Jordi Ribera

No.	Pos.	Name	Date of birth (age)	Height	App.	Goals	Club
1	GK	Maik Santos	6 September 1980 (aged 27)	1.80 m	60	1	(Brazil) EC Pinheiros
3	RB	Fernando Pacheco Filho	25 May 1983 (aged 25)	1.90 m	54	90	(Brazil) EC Pinheiros
5	P	Carlos Ertel	18 December 1974 (aged 33)	1.85 m	139	316	(Brazil) IMES São Caetano
7	RW	Renato Ruy	7 June 1979 (aged 29)	1.84 m	121	211	(Germany) Wilhelmshavener HV
8	LB	Bruno Souza	27 June 1977 (aged 31)	1.99 m	139	316	(Germany) HSV Handball
9	CB	Leonardo Bortolini	10 April 1977 (aged 31)	1.85 m	124	350	(Brazil) Unopar Londrina
10	LW	Helio Justino	23 July 1972 (aged 36)	1.84 m	186	640	(Brazil) IMES São Caetano
12	GK	Alexandre Vasconcelos	19 December 1978 (aged 29)	1.94 m	130	0	(Brazil) Metodista SBC
13	RW	Silvio Laureano	19 April 1981 (aged 27)	1.70 m	30	32	(Brazil) IMES São Caetano
14	P	Alexandre Silva	12 November 1980 (aged 27)	1.90 m			(Brazil) Unopar Londrina
17	LW	Felipe Ribeiro	4 May 1985 (aged 23)	1.86 m	40	21	(Spain) BM Aragón
18	CB	Bruno Santana	27 February 1982 (aged 26)	1.83 m	89	112	(Brazil) EC Pinheiros
19	P	Jardel Pizzinato	10 February 1978 (aged 30)	1.92 m	73	11	(Brazil) Metodista SBC
20	LB	Gui Oliveira	8 January 1985 (aged 23)	1.90 m	40	57	(Austria) HSG Bärnbach/Köflach

Group play

Team	Pld	W	D	L	GF	GA	GD	Pts	Qualification
France	5	4	1	0	148	115	+33	9	Qualified for the quarterfinals
Poland	5	3	1	1	147	128	+19	7	Qualified for the quarterfinals
Croatia	5	3	0	2	140	115	+25	6	Qualified for the quarterfinals
Spain	5	3	0	2	152	145	+7	6	Qualified for the quarterfinals
Brazil	5	1	0	4	129	153	−24	2	
China	5	0	0	5	104	164	−60	0	

10 August 2008; 14:00	France	34 – 26	Brazil	Olympic Sports Centre Gymnasium; Referees: Din, Dinu (ROU)
10 August 2008; 14:00	Girault 7	(19–11)	Ertel 5	Olympic Sports Centre Gymnasium; Referees: Din, Dinu (ROU)
10 August 2008; 14:00	3× (yellow card) 2× (suspension)	Report	3× (yellow card) 4× (suspension)	Olympic Sports Centre Gymnasium; Referees: Din, Dinu (ROU)

12 August 2008; 09:00	Brazil	14 – 33	Croatia	Olympic Sports Centre Gymnasium; Referees: Gjeding, Hansen (DEN)
12 August 2008; 09:00	Ertel, Souza 3	(9–18)	Džomba 7	Olympic Sports Centre Gymnasium; Referees: Gjeding, Hansen (DEN)
12 August 2008; 09:00	3× (yellow card) 4× (suspension)	Report	2× (yellow card) 3× (suspension)	Olympic Sports Centre Gymnasium; Referees: Gjeding, Hansen (DEN)

14 August 2008; 10:45	Poland	28 – 25	Brazil	Olympic Sports Centre Gymnasium; Referees: Karbaschi, Kolahdouzan (IRI)
14 August 2008; 10:45	Jurecki, Tłuczyński 6	(14–15)	Ribeiro 7	Olympic Sports Centre Gymnasium; Referees: Karbaschi, Kolahdouzan (IRI)
14 August 2008; 10:45	3× (yellow card) 2× (suspension)	Report	3× (yellow card) 5× (suspension)	Olympic Sports Centre Gymnasium; Referees: Karbaschi, Kolahdouzan (IRI)

16 August 2008; 09:00	Brazil	29 – 22	China	Olympic Sports Centre Gymnasium; Referees: Elmoamli, Shaban Ali (EGY)
16 August 2008; 09:00	Ribeiro, Laureano 5	(14–10)	Cui Liang, Cui Lei 4	Olympic Sports Centre Gymnasium; Referees: Elmoamli, Shaban Ali (EGY)
16 August 2008; 09:00	3× (yellow card) 3× (suspension)	Report	4× (yellow card) 4× (suspension)	Olympic Sports Centre Gymnasium; Referees: Elmoamli, Shaban Ali (EGY)

18 August 2008; 10:45	Spain	36 – 35	Brazil	Olympic Sports Centre Gymnasium; Referees: Baum, Goralczyk (POL)
18 August 2008; 10:45	Romero 8	(20–17)	Pacheco Filho 12	Olympic Sports Centre Gymnasium; Referees: Baum, Goralczyk (POL)
18 August 2008; 10:45	3× (yellow card) 4× (suspension) 1× (red card)	Report	3× (yellow card) 3× (suspension) 1× (red card)	Olympic Sports Centre Gymnasium; Referees: Baum, Goralczyk (POL)

=== Women's tournament ===
Roster

The following is the Brazil roster in the women's handball tournament of the 2008 Summer Olympics.

Head coach: (Spain) Juan Oliver

No.	Pos.	Name	Date of birth (age)	Height	App.	Goals	Club
1	GK	Chana Masson	18 December 1978 (aged 29)	1.83 m	136	3	(Denmark) Randers HK
2	P	Fabiana Diniz	13 May 1981 (aged 27)	1.83 m	77	100	(Spain) BM Elda Prestigio
3	RW	Alexandra do Nascimento	16 September 1981 (aged 26)	1.77 m	74	170	(Austria) Hypo Niederösterreich
5	P	Daniela Piedade	2 March 1979 (aged 29)	1.73 m	78	134	(Austria) Hypo Niederösterreich
6	LB	Eduarda Amorim	23 September 1986 (aged 21)	1.86 m	40	120	(North Macedonia) Kometal Gjorče Petrov
7	P	Alessandra Oliveira	7 October 1981 (aged 26)	1.84 m	78	121	(Spain) SD Itxako
9	CB	Ana Paula Belo	18 October 1987 (aged 20)	1.72 m	15	35	(Spain) BM Roquetas
10	LW	Aline Rosas	28 June 1979 (aged 29)	1.60 m	105	201	(Brazil) AD Blumenau
11	RW	Viviane Jacques	10 May 1977 (aged 31)	1.70 m	180	260	(Spain) BM Elda Prestigio
13	CB	Lucila Silva	7 March 1976 (aged 32)	1.74 m	173	220	(Brazil) ABC Santo Andre
17	LW	Idalina Mesquita	2 July 1976 (aged 32)	1.71 m	149	326	(Austria) Hypo Niederösterreich
18	RB	Deonise Cavaleiro	20 June 1983 (aged 25)	1.80 m	42	104	(Spain) SD Itxako
19	LB	Aline Santos	17 August 1981 (aged 26)	1.95 m	90	221	(Germany) Frisch Auf Göppingen
23	GK	Darly de Paula	25 August 1982 (aged 25)	1.80 m	98	0	(France) Le Havre AC

Group play

Team	Pld	W	D	L	GF	GA	GD	Pts	Qualification
Russia	5	4	1	0	148	125	+23	9	Qualified for the quarterfinals
South Korea	5	3	1	1	155	127	+28	7	Qualified for the quarterfinals
Hungary	5	2	1	2	129	142	−13	5	Qualified for the quarterfinals
Sweden	5	2	0	3	123	137	−14	4	Qualified for the quarterfinals
Brazil	5	1	1	3	124	137	−13	3	
Germany	5	1	0	4	123	134	−11	2	

9 August 2008; 20:45	Germany	24 – 22	Brazil	Olympic Sports Centre Gymnasium; Referees: Breto, Huelin (ESP)
9 August 2008; 20:45	Krause 6	(11–12)	Santos 6	Olympic Sports Centre Gymnasium; Referees: Breto, Huelin (ESP)
9 August 2008; 20:45	3× (yellow card) 2× (suspension)	Report	3× (yellow card) 2× (suspension)	Olympic Sports Centre Gymnasium; Referees: Breto, Huelin (ESP)

11 August 2008; 10:45	Brazil	28 – 28	Hungary	Olympic Sports Centre Gymnasium; Referees: Baum, Goralczyk (POL)
11 August 2008; 10:45	Amorim 10	(12–17)	Görbicz 8	Olympic Sports Centre Gymnasium; Referees: Baum, Goralczyk (POL)
11 August 2008; 10:45	3× (yellow card) 6× (suspension)	Report	3× (yellow card) 6× (suspension) 1× (red card)	Olympic Sports Centre Gymnasium; Referees: Baum, Goralczyk (POL)

13 August 2008; 09:00	Russia	28 – 19	Brazil	Olympic Sports Centre Gymnasium; Referees: Licis, Stolarovs (LAT)
13 August 2008; 09:00	Poltoratskaya 6	(12–10)	Nascimento 5	Olympic Sports Centre Gymnasium; Referees: Licis, Stolarovs (LAT)
13 August 2008; 09:00	2× (yellow card) 4× (suspension)	Report	3× (yellow card) 2× (suspension)	Olympic Sports Centre Gymnasium; Referees: Licis, Stolarovs (LAT)

15 August 2008; 10:45	Brazil	33 – 32	South Korea	Olympic Sports Centre Gymnasium; Referees: Licis, Stolarovs (LAT)
15 August 2008; 10:45	Nascimento 9	(17–12)	Hong Jeong-ho 10	Olympic Sports Centre Gymnasium; Referees: Licis, Stolarovs (LAT)
15 August 2008; 10:45	4× (yellow card) 6× (suspension)	Report	3× (yellow card) 5× (suspension) 1× (red card)	Olympic Sports Centre Gymnasium; Referees: Licis, Stolarovs (LAT)

17 August 2008; 09:00	Sweden	25 – 22	Brazil	Olympic Sports Centre Gymnasium; Referees: Bord, Buy (FRA)
17 August 2008; 09:00	Ahlm 7	(14–11)	Rosas 5	Olympic Sports Centre Gymnasium; Referees: Bord, Buy (FRA)
17 August 2008; 09:00	3× (yellow card) 3× (suspension)	Report	2× (yellow card) 4× (suspension)	Olympic Sports Centre Gymnasium; Referees: Bord, Buy (FRA)

== Judo ==
Qualification spots were won at the 2007 World Judo Championships and the Pan-American Judo Union Championships.

Men

Athlete	Event	Preliminary	Round of 32	Round of 16	Quarterfinals	Semifinals	Repechage 1	Repechage 2	Repechage 3	Final / BM	
Athlete	Event	Opposition Result	Opposition Result	Opposition Result	Opposition Result	Opposition Result	Opposition Result	Opposition Result	Opposition Result	Opposition Result	Rank
Denílson Lourenço	−60 kg	Korotun (UKR); W 1001–0001	Petříkov (CZE); L 0000–0011	Did not advance							
João Derly	−66 kg	Bye	Kim J-J (KOR); W 0002–0001	Dias (POR); L 0010–0101	Did not advance						
Leandro Guilheiro	−73 kg	—N/a	Bertolotti (ARG); W 0100–0010	August (RSA); W 1001–0000	Wang K-C (KOR); L 0000–0100	Did not advance	Bye	Muminov (UZB); W 1000–0000	Bilodid (UKR); W 1000–0001	Maloumat (IRI); W 1000–0000	3rd place, bronze medalist(s)
Tiago Camilo	−81 kg	Bye	Ono (JPN); W 0120-0000	Malekmohammadi (IRI); W 1010–0000	Bischof (GER); L 0000–0200	Did not advance	Bye	Stevens (USA); W 0011–0010	Burton (GBR); W 0100–0010	Elmont (NED); W 1100–0001	3rd place, bronze medalist(s)
Eduardo Santos	−90 kg	—N/a	He Yz (CHN); W 1000–0000	Camacho (VEN); W 1000–0000	Dafreville (FRA); L 0001–1011	Did not advance	Bye	Meloni (ITA); W 1000-0000	Aschwanden (SUI); L 0000–0000 YUS	Did not advance	
Luciano Corrêa	−100 kg	—N/a	Grol (NED); L 0001–0210	Did not advance			Ze'evi (ISR); W 0011–0001	Matyjaszek (POL); L 0000–1000	Did not advance		
João Schlittler	+100 kg	Bye	Sotnikov (UKR); W 0010–0001	Padar (EST); W 0010–0000	Brayson (CUB); L 0000–1000	Did not advance	Bye	Hachache (LIB); W 1031–0000	Riner (FRA); L 0000–1000	Did not advance	

Women

Athlete	Event	Round of 32	Round of 16	Quarterfinals	Semifinals	Repechage 1	Repechage 2	Repechage 3	Final / BM	
Athlete	Event	Opposition Result	Opposition Result	Opposition Result	Opposition Result	Opposition Result	Opposition Result	Opposition Result	Opposition Result	Rank
Sarah Menezes	−48 kg	Csernoviczki (HUN); L 0000–1000	Did not advance							
Andressa Fernandes	−52 kg	García (DOM); L 0001–0010	Did not advance							
Ketleyn Quadros	−57 kg	Kang S-Y (KOR); W 0011–0002	Gravenstijn (NED); L 0000–0001	Did not advance		Bye	Fernández (ESP); W 0001–0000	Sato (JPN); W 1000–0000	Pekli (AUS); W 1000–0000	3rd place, bronze medalist(s)
Danielli Yuri	−63 kg	Kong J-Y (KOR); L 0100–1000	Did not advance							
Mayra Aguiar	−70 kg	Iglesias (ESP); L 0011–0020	Did not advance							
Edinanci Silva	−78 kg	Bye	San Miguel (ESP); L 0010–0011	Did not advance		Moskalyuk (RUS); W 0021–0000	Morico (ITA); W 1101–0000	Lkhamdegd (MGL); W 1131–0010	Jeong (KOR); L 0000–1010	5

== Modern pentathlon ==
Athlete	Event	Shooting (10 m air pistol)			Fencing (épée one touch)			Swimming (200 m freestyle)			Riding (show jumping)			Running (3000 m)			Total points	Final rank
Athlete	Event	Points	Rank	MP Points	Results	Rank	MP points	Time	Rank	MP points	Penalties	Rank	MP points	Time	Rank	MP Points	Total points	Final rank
Yane Marques	Women's	185	7	1156	19–16	14	856	2:15.44	6	1296	252	33	948	11:01.61	24	1076	5332	12

== Rowing ==
Men

Athlete	Event	Heats		Repechage		Quarterfinals		Semifinals		Final	
Athlete	Event	Time	Rank	Time	Rank	Time	Rank	Time	Rank	Time	Rank
Anderson Nocetti	Single sculls	7:35.52	2 QF	—N/a		7:23.68	5 SC/D	7:18.78	3 FC	7:01.54	14
Thiago Almeida; Thiago Gomes	Lightweight double sculls	6:30.78	5 R	6:51.99	4 SC/D	—N/a		6:39.91	2 FC	6:36.24	17

Women

Athlete	Event	Heats		Repechage		Quarterfinals		Semifinals		Final	
Athlete	Event	Time	Rank	Time	Rank	Time	Rank	Time	Rank	Time	Rank
Fabiana Beltrame	Single sculls	8:08.84	4 QF	—N/a		7:52.65	5 SC/D	8:13.01	4 FD	7:43.04	19
Camila Carvalho; Luciana Granato	Lightweight double sculls	7:25.90	5 R	7:47.53	5 FC	—N/a		Bye		7:22.40	15

Qualification Legend: FA=Final A (medal); FB=Final B (non-medal); FC=Final C (non-medal); FD=Final D (non-medal); FE=Final E (non-medal); FF=Final F (non-medal); SA/B=Semifinals A/B; SC/D=Semifinals C/D; SE/F=Semifinals E/F; QF=Quarterfinals; R=Repechage

== Sailing ==
Men

Athlete	Event	Race											Net points	Final rank
Athlete	Event	1	2	3	4	5	6	7	8	9	10	M*	Net points	Final rank
Ricardo Santos	RS:X	12	6	13	7	6	3	6	7	5	~~33~~	12	65	5
Bruno Fontes	Laser	31	17	31	12	12	24	35	23	~~39~~	CAN	EL	185	27
Samuel Albrecht; Fábio Pillar	470	9	~~30~~	10	18	4	30	16	10	24	13	EL	134	17
Bruno Prada; Robert Scheidt	Star	10	~~11~~	6	1	9	10	2	3	3	3	6	53	2nd place, silver medalist(s)

Women

Athlete	Event	Race											Net points	Final rank
Athlete	Event	1	2	3	4	5	6	7	8	9	10	M*	Net points	Final rank
Patrícia Freitas	RS:X	20	13	15	~~23~~	6	7	21	17	16	20	EL	135	18
Fernanda Oliveira; Isabel Swan	470	11	~~16~~	5	10	7	6	6	2	7	4	2	60	3rd place, bronze medalist(s)

Open

Athlete	Event	Race																Net points	Final rank
Athlete	Event	1	2	3	4	5	6	7	8	9	10	11	12	13	14	15	M*	Net points	Final rank
Eduardo Couto	Finn	6	16	~~DNF~~	7	2	17	14	27	CAN	CAN	—N/a					EL	89	13
André Fonseca; Rodrigo Duarte	49er	10	5	8	9	9	4	12	5	11	1	9	~~13~~	CAN	CAN	CAN	16	99	7

M = Medal race; EL = Eliminated – did not advance into the medal race; CAN = Race cancelled;

== Shooting ==
Men

Athlete	Event	Qualification		Final	
Athlete	Event	Points	Rank	Points	Rank
Júlio Almeida	10 m air pistol	580	13	Did not advance	
Júlio Almeida	25 m rapid fire pistol	568	11	Did not advance	
Júlio Almeida	50 m pistol	554	18	Did not advance	
Stênio Yamamoto	10 m air pistol	568	43	Did not advance	
Stênio Yamamoto	50 m pistol	538	44	Did not advance	

== Swimming ==
Men

Athlete	Event	Heat		Semifinal		Final	
Athlete	Event	Time	Rank	Time	Rank	Time	Rank
Nicholas Santos	50 m freestyle	22.00	11 Q	22.15	16	Did not advance	
César Cielo	50 m freestyle	21.47	2 Q	21.34 OR	1 Q	21.30 OR	1st place, gold medalist(s)
César Cielo	100 m freestyle	48.16	7 Q	48.07	8 Q	47.67	3rd place, bronze medalist(s)
Rodrigo Castro	200 m freestyle	1:47.87	18 Q	1:48.71	16	Did not advance	
Guilherme Guido	100 m backstroke	54.89	=20	Did not advance			
Lucas Salatta	200 m backstroke	1:59.91	23	Did not advance			
Felipe França Silva	100 m breaststroke	1:01.04	22	Did not advance			
Henrique Barbosa	100 m breaststroke	1:01.11	23	Did not advance			
Henrique Barbosa	200 m breaststroke	2:12.99	30	Did not advance			
Gabriel Mangabeira	100 m butterfly	52.28	23	Did not advance			
Kaio de Almeida	100 m butterfly	52.05	16 Q	52.32	15	Did not advance	
Kaio de Almeida	200 m butterfly	1:54.65	3 Q	1:55.21	6 Q	1:54.71	7
Thiago Pereira	200 m breaststroke	2:11.40	19	Did not advance			
Thiago Pereira	200 m individual medley	1:58.41	3 Q	1:58.06	3 Q	1:58.14	4
Thiago Pereira	400 m individual medley	4:11.74	8 Q	—N/a		4:15.40	8
Rodrigo Castro; César Cielo; Fernando Silva; Nicolas Oliveira	4 × 100 m freestyle relay	DSQ		—N/a		Did not advance	
Rodrigo Castro; Phillip Morrison; Nicolas Oliveira; Lucas Salatta	4 × 200 m freestyle relay	7:19.54	16	—N/a		Did not advance	
Kaio de Almeida; Guilherme Guido; Nicolas Oliveira; Felipe Silva	4 × 100 m medley relay	3:38.66	14	—N/a		Did not advance	
Allan do Carmo	10 km open water	—N/a				1:52:16.6	14

Women

Athlete	Event	Heat		Semifinal		Final	
Athlete	Event	Time	Rank	Time	Rank	Time	Rank
Flávia Cazziolato	50 m freestyle	25.34	=22	Did not advance			
Tatiana Barbosa	100 m freestyle	55.01	19	Did not advance			
Monique Ferreira	200 m freestyle	2:00.64	=28	Did not advance			
Monique Ferreira	400 m freestyle	4:12.21	21	—N/a		Did not advance	
Fabíola Molina	100 m backstroke	1:01.00	18	Did not advance			
Tatiane Sakemi	100 m breaststroke	1:11.75	39	Did not advance			
Tatiane Sakemi	200 m breaststroke	2:39.13	40	Did not advance			
Daynara de Paula	100 m butterfly	59.45	34	Did not advance			
Gabriella Silva	100 m butterfly	58.00	5 Q	58.39	8 Q	58.10	7
Joanna Melo	200 m butterfly	2:10.64	22	Did not advance			
Joanna Melo	200 m individual medley	2:14.97	22	Did not advance			
Joanna Melo	400 m individual medley	4:40.18	17	—N/a		Did not advance	
Tatiana Barbosa; Flávia Cazziolato; Monique Ferreira; Michelle Lenhardt	4 × 100 m freestyle relay	3:42.85	13	—N/a		Did not advance	
Tatiana Barbosa; Fabíola Molina; Tatiane Sakemi; Gabriella Silva	4 × 100 m medley relay	4:02.61	10	—N/a		Did not advance	
Ana Marcela Cunha	10 km open water	—N/a				1:59:36.8	5
Poliana Okimoto	10 km open water	—N/a				1:59:37.4	7

== Synchronized swimming ==
Lara Teixeira and Nayara Figueira qualified at the Olympic Qualifying Tournament in Beijing.

Athlete	Event	Technical routine		Free routine (preliminary)			Free routine (final)		
Athlete	Event	Points	Rank	Points	Total (technical + free)	Rank	Points	Total (technical + free)	Rank
Nayara Figueira; Lara Teixeira	Duet	44.334	12	44.667	89.001	13	Did not advance		

== Table tennis ==
Gustavo Tsuboi, Thiago Monteiro and Mariany Nonaka all qualified at the 18th Latin American Championship.

Singles

Athlete	Event	Preliminary round	Round 1	Round 2	Round 3	Round 4	Quarterfinals	Semifinals	Final / BM	
Athlete	Event	Opposition Result	Opposition Result	Opposition Result	Opposition Result	Opposition Result	Opposition Result	Opposition Result	Opposition Result	Rank
Thiago Monteiro	Men's singles	Bye	Kim H-B (PRK); L 1–4	Did not advance						
Gustavo Tsuboi	Men's singles	Peter-Paul (CAN); W 4–3	Gionis (GRE); L 0–4	Did not advance						
Mariany Nonaka	Women's singles	Paškauskienė (LTU); L 0–4	Did not advance							

Team

Athlete	Event	Group round		Semifinals	Bronze playoff 1	Bronze playoff 2	Bronze medal	Final	
Athlete	Event	Opposition Result	Rank	Opposition Result	Opposition Result	Opposition Result	Opposition Result	Opposition Result	Rank
Hugo Hoyama; Thiago Monteiro; Gustavo Tsuboi	Men's team	Group C South Korea; L 1–3; Chinese Taipei; L 1–3; Sweden; L 0–3	4	Did not advance					

== Taekwondo ==
Men

Athlete	Event	Round of 16	Quarterfinals	Semifinals	Repechage	Bronze Medal	Final	
Athlete	Event	Opposition Result	Opposition Result	Opposition Result	Opposition Result	Opposition Result	Opposition Result	Rank
Márcio Wenceslau	Men's −58 kg	Naderian (IRI); W 2–1	Ramos (ESP); L 2–3	Did not advance				

Women

Athlete	Event	Round of 16	Quarterfinals	Semifinals	Repechage	Bronze Medal	Final	
Athlete	Event	Opposition Result	Opposition Result	Opposition Result	Opposition Result	Opposition Result	Opposition Result	Rank
Débora Nunes	Women's −57 kg	Lele (NIG); W DSQ	Zubčić (CRO); L 2–3	Did not advance				
Natália Falavigna	Women's +67 kg	Kouvari (GRE); W 3–1	Marton (AUS); W 5–2	Solheim (NOR); L 2–2 SUP	Bye	Kedzierska (SWE); W 5–2	Did not advance	3rd place, bronze medalist(s)

== Tennis ==
Athlete	Event	Round of 64	Round of 32	Round of 16	Quarterfinals	Semifinals	Final / BM	
Athlete	Event	Opposition Score	Opposition Score	Opposition Score	Opposition Score	Opposition Score	Opposition Score	Rank
Thomaz Bellucci	Men's singles	Hrbatý (SVK); L 6–2, 4–6, 2–6	Did not advance					
Marcos Daniel	Men's singles	Melzer (AUT); L 7–6^{(11–9)}, 1–6, 6–8	Did not advance					
Marcelo Melo; André Sá	Men's doubles	—N/a	Berdych / Štěpánek (CZE); W 5–7, 6–2, 8–6	Bhupathi / Paes (IND); L 4–6, 2–6	Did not advance			

== Triathlon ==
Athlete	Event	Swim (1.5 km)	Trans 1	Bike (40 km)	Trans 2	Run (10 km)	Total Time	Rank
Reinaldo Colucci	Men's	18:24	0:27	1:17:43	0:30	33:22	1:51:35.57	26
Juraci Moreira	Men's	18:52	0:29	1:17:47	0:30	34:56	1:53:13.94	37
Mariana Ohata	Women's	20:02	0:30	1:26:56	0:32	39:43	2:07:11.92	39

== Volleyball ==
=== Beach ===
Athlete	Event	Preliminary round	Standing	Round of 16	Quarterfinals	Semifinals	Final / BM	
Athlete	Event	Opposition Score	Standing	Opposition Score	Opposition Score	Opposition Score	Opposition Score	Rank
Márcio Araújo; Fabio Luiz Magalhães	Men's tournament	Pool D Amore – Lione (ITA); W 2–0 (21–18, 21–18); Doppler – Gartmayer (AUT); L 1–2 (20–22, 21–19, 15–11); Barsouk – Kolodinsky (RUS); W 2–0 (24–22, 21–17)	2 Q	Asahi – Shiratori (JPN); W 2–0 (23–21, 21–15)	Gosch – Horst (AUT); W 2–0 (22–20, 21–17)	Emanuel – Ricardo (BRA); W 2–0 (22–20, 21–18)	Dalhausser – Rogers (USA); L 1–2 (21–23, 21–17, 4–15)	2nd place, silver medalist(s)
Emanuel Rego; Ricardo Santos	Men's tournament	Pool C Fernandes – Morais (ANG); W 2–0 (21–8, 21–13); Geor – Gia (GEO); W 2–0 (21–19, 21–17); Schacht – Slack (AUS); W 2–0 (21–14, 21–17)	1 Q	Barsouk – Kolodinsky (RUS); W 2–1 (18–21, 25–23, 15–13)	Gibb – Rosenthal (USA); W 2–0 (21–18, 21–16)	Araújo – Luiz (BRA); L 0–2 (20–22, 18–21)	Geor – Gia (GEO); W 2–0 (21–15, 21–10)	3rd place, bronze medalist(s)

Women

Athlete	Event	Preliminary round	Standing	Round of 16	Quarterfinals	Semifinals	Final / BM	
Athlete	Event	Opposition Score	Standing	Opposition Score	Opposition Score	Opposition Score	Opposition Score	Rank
Talita Antunes; Renata Ribeiro	Women's tournament	Pool F Candelas – García (MEX); W 2–1 (18–21, 21–16, 15–8); D Schwaiger – S Schwaiger (AUT); W 2–0 (21–18, 21–19); Arvaniti – Karantasiou (GRE); W 2–0 (22–20, 21–19)	1 Q	Glesnes – Maaseide (NOR); W 2–1 (12–21, 21–19, 15–13)	Barnett – Cook (AUS); W 2–0 (24–22, 21–14)	May-Treanor – Walsh (USA); L 0–2 (12–21, 14–21)	Xue C – Zhang X (CHN); L 0–2 (19–21, 17–21)	4
Ana Paula Connelly; Larissa França	Women's tournament	Pool C Rtvelo – Saka (GEO); W 2–1 (23–25, 21–17, 15–5); Shiryaeva – Uryadova (RUS); W 2–1 (19–21, 21–12, 15–13); Barnett – Cook (AUS); L 0–2 (23–21, 23–21)	2 Q	Pohl – Rau (GER); W 2–0 (21–18, 21–14)	May-Treanor – Walsh (USA); L 0–2 (18–21, 15–21)	Did not advance		

=== Indoor ===
Brazil qualified a team to both the men's and the women's tournaments. The men's team won all their group matches but one, and advanced to the final round. There, they won both the quarterfinal and the semifinal, but lost the gold medal game, having to settle for the silver medal.

The women's team went through the tournament undefeated, winning all their games, and ultimately becoming the Olympic champions.

Summary

Team	Event	Group Stage						Quarterfinal	Semifinal	Final / BM	
Team	Event	Opposition Score	Opposition Score	Opposition Score	Opposition Score	Opposition Score	Rank	Opposition Score	Opposition Score	Opposition Score	Rank
Brazil men's	Men's tournament	Egypt; W 3–0	Serbia; W 3–1	Russia; L 1–3	Poland; W 3–0	Germany; W 3–0	1 Q	China; W 3–0	Italy; W 3–1	United States; L 1–3	2nd place, silver medalist(s)
Brazil women's	Women's tournament	Algeria; W 3–0	Russia; W 3–0	Serbia; W 3–0	Kazakhstan; W 3–0	Italy; W 3–0	1 Q	Japan; W 3–0	China; W 3–0	United States; W 3–1	1st place, gold medalist(s)

==== Men's tournament ====
Brazil qualified by winning the 2007 FIVB Men's World Cup.

Roster

The following is the Brazilian roster in the men's volleyball tournament of the 2008 Summer Olympics.

Head Coach: Bernardinho

No.	Name	Date of birth	Height	Weight	Spike	Block	2008 club
1	Bruno Rezende	2 July 1986	1.90 m (6 ft 3 in)	76 kg (168 lb)	323 cm (127 in)	302 cm (119 in)	(Brazil) Cimed
2	Marcelo Elgarten	9 November 1974	1.83 m (6 ft 0 in)	78 kg (172 lb)	321 cm (126 in)	308 cm (121 in)	(Greece) Panathinaikos VC
4	André Heller	17 December 1975	1.99 m (6 ft 6 in)	93 kg (205 lb)	339 cm (133 in)	321 cm (126 in)	(Italy) Pallavolo Modena
6	Samuel Fuchs	4 March 1984	2.00 m (6 ft 7 in)	89 kg (196 lb)	342 cm (135 in)	316 cm (124 in)	(Russia) Lokomotiv Belgorod
7	Giba (c)	23 December 1976	1.92 m (6 ft 4 in)	85 kg (187 lb)	325 cm (128 in)	312 cm (123 in)	(Russia) Iskra Odintsovo
8	Murilo Endres	3 May 1981	1.90 m (6 ft 3 in)	76 kg (168 lb)	343 cm (135 in)	319 cm (126 in)	(Italy) Pallavolo Modena
9	André Nascimento	4 March 1979	1.95 m (6 ft 5 in)	95 kg (209 lb)	340 cm (130 in)	320 cm (130 in)	(Italy) Pallavolo Modena
10	Sérgio Santos (L)	15 October 1975	1.84 m (6 ft 0 in)	78 kg (172 lb)	325 cm (128 in)	310 cm (120 in)	(Italy) Copra Nordmeccanica
11	Anderson Rodrigues	21 May 1974	1.90 m (6 ft 3 in)	95 kg (209 lb)	330 cm (130 in)	321 cm (126 in)	(Brazil) Sport Club Ulbra
13	Gustavo Endres	23 August 1975	2.03 m (6 ft 8 in)	98 kg (216 lb)	337 cm (133 in)	325 cm (128 in)	(Italy) Sisley Treviso
14	Rodrigão	17 April 1979	2.05 m (6 ft 9 in)	85 kg (187 lb)	350 cm (140 in)	328 cm (129 in)	(Italy) Lube Banca Marche
18	Dante Amaral	30 September 1980	2.01 m (6 ft 7 in)	88 kg (194 lb)	345 cm (136 in)	327 cm (129 in)	(Greece) Panathinaikos VC

Preliminary round

Pos	Team	Pld	W	L	Pts	SPW	SPL	SPR	SW	SL	SR	Qualification
1	Brazil	5	4	1	9	427	373	1.145	13	4	3.250	Quarterfinals
2	Russia	5	4	1	9	496	447	1.110	14	7	2.000	Quarterfinals
3	Poland	5	4	1	9	434	404	1.074	12	6	2.000	Quarterfinals
4	Serbia	5	2	3	7	440	439	1.002	9	10	0.900	Quarterfinals
5	Germany	5	1	4	6	418	440	0.950	6	12	0.500	
6	Egypt	5	0	5	5	267	379	0.704	0	15	0.000	

10 August 2008; 15:20	Brazil	3–0	Egypt	Capital Indoor Stadium, Beijing; Attendance: 8,500; Referees: Ning Wang (CHN), Mohammad Shahmiri (IRI)
10 August 2008; 15:20	(25–19, 25–15, 25–18) result statistics			Capital Indoor Stadium, Beijing; Attendance: 8,500; Referees: Ning Wang (CHN), Mohammad Shahmiri (IRI)

12 August 2008; 15:00	Serbia	1–3	Brazil	Capital Indoor Stadium, Beijing; Attendance: 9,000; Referees: Ning Wang (CHN), Osamu Sakaide (JPN)
12 August 2008; 15:00	(27–25, 20–25, 17–25, 21–25) result statistics			Capital Indoor Stadium, Beijing; Attendance: 9,000; Referees: Ning Wang (CHN), Osamu Sakaide (JPN)

14 August 2008; 12:30	Brazil	1–3	Russia	Capital Indoor Stadium, Beijing; Attendance: 12,000; Referees: Victor Rodriguez (PUR), Ning Wang (CHN)
14 August 2008; 12:30	(25–22, 24–26, 29–31, 19–25) result statistics			Capital Indoor Stadium, Beijing; Attendance: 12,000; Referees: Victor Rodriguez (PUR), Ning Wang (CHN)

16 August 2008; 20:00	Brazil	3–0	Poland	Capital Indoor Stadium, Beijing; Attendance: 12,500; Referees: Kun-Tae Kim (KOR), Osamu Sakaide (JPN)
16 August 2008; 20:00	(30–28, 25–19, 25–19) result statistics			Capital Indoor Stadium, Beijing; Attendance: 12,500; Referees: Kun-Tae Kim (KOR), Osamu Sakaide (JPN)

18 August 2008; 12:20	Germany	0–3	Brazil	Beijing Institute of Technology Gymnasium, Beijing; Attendance: 3,400; Referees: Jiang Liu (CHN), Umit Sokullu (TUR)
18 August 2008; 12:20	(22–25, 21–25, 23–25) result statistics			Beijing Institute of Technology Gymnasium, Beijing; Attendance: 3,400; Referees: Jiang Liu (CHN), Umit Sokullu (TUR)

Quarterfinal

20 August 2008; 20:00	China	0–3	Brazil	Capital Indoor Stadium, Beijing; Attendance: 13,000; Referees: Massimo Menghini (ITA), Frank Leuthauser (GER)
20 August 2008; 20:00	(17–25, 15–25, 16–25) result statistics			Capital Indoor Stadium, Beijing; Attendance: 13,000; Referees: Massimo Menghini (ITA), Frank Leuthauser (GER)

Semifinal

22 August 2008; 20:00	Italy	1–3	Brazil	Capital Indoor Stadium, Beijing; Attendance: 12,500; Referees: Kun-Tae Kim (KOR), Humberto Salas (MEX)
22 August 2008; 20:00	(25–19, 18–25, 21–25, 22–25) result statistics			Capital Indoor Stadium, Beijing; Attendance: 12,500; Referees: Kun-Tae Kim (KOR), Humberto Salas (MEX)

Gold medal game

24 August 2008; 12:00	(gold) United States	3–1	Brazil (silver)	Capital Indoor Stadium, Beijing; Attendance: 13,000; Referees: Ning Wang (CHN), Bela Hobor (HUN)
24 August 2008; 12:00	(20–25, 25–22, 25–21, 25–23) result statistics			Capital Indoor Stadium, Beijing; Attendance: 13,000; Referees: Ning Wang (CHN), Bela Hobor (HUN)

==== Women's tournament ====
Brazil qualified by being runner-up at the 2007 FIVB Women's World Cup.

Roster

The following is the Brazilian roster in the women's volleyball tournament of the 2008 Summer Olympics.

Head Coach: José Roberto Guimarães

№	Name	Date of birth	Height	Weight	Spike	Block	2008 club
1	Walewska Oliveira	1 October 1979	1.90 m (6 ft 3 in)	73 kg (161 lb)	310 cm (120 in)	290 cm (110 in)	(Spain) CAV Murcia
2	Carolina Albuquerque	25 July 1977	1.82 m (6 ft 0 in)	76 kg (168 lb)	289 cm (114 in)	279 cm (110 in)	(Brazil) Finasa
3	Marianne Steinbrecher	23 August 1983	1.89 m (6 ft 2 in)	70 kg (150 lb)	310 cm (120 in)	290 cm (110 in)	(Italy) Scavolini Pesaro
4	Paula Pequeno	22 January 1982	1.84 m (6 ft 0 in)	74 kg (163 lb)	302 cm (119 in)	285 cm (112 in)	(Brazil) Finasa
6	Thaísa Menezes	15 May 1987	1.96 m (6 ft 5 in)	79 kg (174 lb)	316 cm (124 in)	301 cm (119 in)	(Brazil) Rexona Ades
7	Hélia Souza (c)	3 October 1970	1.75 m (5 ft 9 in)	63 kg (139 lb)	283 cm (111 in)	264 cm (104 in)	(Spain) CAV Murcia
8	Valeska Menezes	23 April 1976	1.80 m (5 ft 11 in)	62 kg (137 lb)	302 cm (119 in)	290 cm (110 in)	(Italy) Asystel Novara
9	Fabiana Claudino	24 January 1985	1.94 m (6 ft 4 in)	76 kg (168 lb)	314 cm (124 in)	293 cm (115 in)	(Brazil) Rexona Ades
10	Wélissa Gonzaga	9 September 1982	1.80 m (5 ft 11 in)	76 kg (168 lb)	300 cm (120 in)	287 cm (113 in)	(Brazil) Rexona Ades
12	Jaqueline Carvalho	31 December 1983	1.86 m (6 ft 1 in)	70 kg (150 lb)	302 cm (119 in)	286 cm (113 in)	(Spain) CAV Murcia
13	Sheilla Castro	1 July 1983	1.86 m (6 ft 1 in)	64 kg (141 lb)	302 cm (119 in)	284 cm (112 in)	(Italy) Scavolini Pesaro
14	Fabiana de Oliveira (L)	7 March 1980	1.68 m (5 ft 6 in)	59 kg (130 lb)	276 cm (109 in)	266 cm (105 in)	(Brazil) Rexona Ades

Preliminary round

Pos	Team	Pld	W	L	Pts	SPW	SPL	SPR	SW	SL	SR	Qualification
1	Brazil	5	5	0	10	377	226	1.668	15	0	MAX	Quarterfinals
2	Italy	5	4	1	9	372	315	1.181	12	4	3.000	Quarterfinals
3	Russia	5	3	2	8	353	312	1.131	10	6	1.667	Quarterfinals
4	Serbia	5	2	3	7	343	349	0.983	6	10	0.600	Quarterfinals
5	Kazakhstan	5	1	4	6	323	404	0.800	4	13	0.308	
6	Algeria	5	0	5	5	230	392	0.587	1	15	0.067	

9 August 2008; 12:30	Algeria	0–3	Brazil	Capital Indoor Stadium; Attendance: 12,000; Referees: Liu Jiang (China), Ibrahim al-Naama (Qatar)
9 August 2008; 12:30	(11–25, 11–25, 10–25) result statistics			Capital Indoor Stadium; Attendance: 12,000; Referees: Liu Jiang (China), Ibrahim al-Naama (Qatar)

11 August 2008; 14:30	Brazil	3–0	Russia	Capital Indoor Stadium; Attendance: 12,000; Referees: Osamu Sakaide (Japan), Wang Ning (China)
11 August 2008; 14:30	(25–14, 25–14, 25–16) result statistics			Capital Indoor Stadium; Attendance: 12,000; Referees: Osamu Sakaide (Japan), Wang Ning (China)

13 August 2008; 14:30	Serbia	0–3	Brazil	Capital Indoor Stadium; Attendance: 11,000; Referees: Kim Kun-Tae (South Korea), Frans Loderus (Netherlands)
13 August 2008; 14:30	(15–25, 13–25, 23–25) result statistics			Capital Indoor Stadium; Attendance: 11,000; Referees: Kim Kun-Tae (South Korea), Frans Loderus (Netherlands)

15 August 2008; 12:00	Brazil	3–0	Kazakhstan	Beijing Institute of Technology Gymnasium; Attendance: 3,500; Referees: Dejan Jovanovic (Serbia), Karin Zahorcova (Czech Republic)
15 August 2008; 12:00	(25–13, 25–6, 27–25) result statistics			Beijing Institute of Technology Gymnasium; Attendance: 3,500; Referees: Dejan Jovanovic (Serbia), Karin Zahorcova (Czech Republic)

17 August 2008; 15:15	Italy	0–3	Brazil	Capital Indoor Stadium; Attendance: 10,500; Referees: Humberto Salas (Mexico), Mitch Davidson (Canada)
17 August 2008; 15:15	(16–25, 22–25, 17–25) result statistics			Capital Indoor Stadium; Attendance: 10,500; Referees: Humberto Salas (Mexico), Mitch Davidson (Canada)

Quarterfinal

19 August 2008; 12:00	Japan	0–3	Brazil	Capital Indoor Stadium; Attendance: 12,500; Referees: Konstantin Tufekchiev (Bulgaria), Karin Zahorcova (Czech Republic)
19 August 2008; 12:00	(12–25, 20–25, 16–25) result statistics			Capital Indoor Stadium; Attendance: 12,500; Referees: Konstantin Tufekchiev (Bulgaria), Karin Zahorcova (Czech Republic)

Semifinal

21 August 2008; 20:00	China	0–3	Brazil	Capital Indoor Stadium; Attendance: 13,000; Referees: Frank Leuthauser (Germany), Andrei Zenovich (Russia)
21 August 2008; 20:00	(25–27, 22–25, 14–25) result statistics			Capital Indoor Stadium; Attendance: 13,000; Referees: Frank Leuthauser (Germany), Andrei Zenovich (Russia)

Gold medal game

23 August 2008; 20:00	(silver) United States	1–3	Brazil (gold)	Capital Indoor Stadium; Attendance: 13.000; Referees: Massimo Menghini (Italy), Umit Sokullu (Turkey)
23 August 2008; 20:00	(15–25, 25–18, 13–25, 21–25) result statistics			Capital Indoor Stadium; Attendance: 13.000; Referees: Massimo Menghini (Italy), Umit Sokullu (Turkey)

== Weightlifting ==
Wellison Silva qualified at the 2008 Pan American Weightlifting Championships.

Athlete	Event	Snatch		Clean & Jerk		Total	Rank
Athlete	Event	Result	Rank	Result	Rank	Total	Rank
Wellison Silva	Men's −69 kg	135	=15	155	18	290	18

== Wrestling ==
Key:

- VT – Victory by Fall.
- PP – Decision by Points – the loser with technical points.
- PO – Decision by Points – the loser without technical points.

Women's freestyle

Athlete	Event	Round of 16	Quarterfinal	Semifinal	Repechage 1	Repechage 2	Final / BM	
Athlete	Event	Opposition Result	Opposition Result	Opposition Result	Opposition Result	Opposition Result	Opposition Result	Rank
Rosângela Conceição	−72 kg	Zhanibekova (KAZ); W 3–1 ^{PP}	Hamaguchi (JPN); L 0–5 ^{VT}	Did not advance				8

== See also ==
- Brazil at the 2008 Summer Paralympics
- Brazil at the 2007 Pan American Games
- Brazil at the Olympics
- Sports in Brazil
