= Alexandre Rodrigues =

Alexandre Rodrigues may refer to:

- Alexandre Rodrigues (actor) (born 1983), Brazilian actor
- Alexandre Rodrigues (handballer) (born 1980), Brazilian handball player
- Alexandre Rodrigues Ferreira, Portuguese naturalist
- Alexandre Rodrigues da Silva, known as Alexandre Pato, Brazilian footballer
