= Judo at the 2008 Summer Olympics – Qualification =

Qualification for judo at the Games of the XXIX Olympiad

Qualification for Judo at the 2008 Summer Olympics was based on the IJF 2007 World Judo Championships in September 2007. The top 6 men and women from each division qualify, subject to a limit of 1 judoka per National Olympic Committee ("NOC") per division. Further continental quotas (Europe 98, Africa 35, Pan-America 63, Asia 58 and Oceania 14 across both sexes and all divisions) also qualify subject to an overall limit of 1 judoka per NOC. The qualification is allocated to the athlete.

== Qualification summary ==
NOC	Men							Women							Total
NOC	-60kg	-66kg	-73kg	-81kg	-90kg	-100kg	+100kg	-48kg	-52kg	-57kg	-63kg	-70kg	-78kg	+78kg	Total
Albania				X											1
Algeria	X	X	X		X	X		X	X	X	X	X			10
American Samoa											X				1
Andorra		X													1
Argentina	X		X	X	X	X	X	X			X		X		9
Armenia	X	X													2
Aruba				X											1
Australia	X	X	X	X	X	X	X	X	X	X	X		X	X	13
Austria	X									X	X				3
Azerbaijan		X	X	X	X	X				X					6
Belarus			X	X	X		X								4
Belgium			X						X			X			3
Bosnia and Herzegovina						X									1
Brazil	X	X	X	X	X	X	X	X	X	X	X	X	X		13
Burkina Faso								X							1
Cameroon						X									1
Canada	X	X	X			X							X		5
Chile		X													1
China	X	X	X	X	X	X	X	X	X	X	X	X	X	X	14
Chinese Taipei									X		X				2
Colombia				X								X			2
Cuba	X	X	X	X	X	X	X	X	X	X	X	X	X	X	14
Czech Republic	X		X												2
Dominican Republic		X				X			X						3
Democratic Republic of the Congo			X												1
Ecuador		X						X						X	3
Egypt		X			X		X							X	4
El Salvador				X											1
Equatorial Guinea				X											1
Estonia							X								1
Fiji												X			1
Finland										X	X				2
France	X	X		X	X	X	X	X	X	X	X	X	X	X	13
Gabon								X							1
Georgia	X	X	X	X	X	X	X								7
Germany				X	X	X	X	X	X	X	X	X	X	X	11
Great Britain	X			X	X	X					X		X	X	7
Greece	X	X			X										3
Guam							X								1
Haiti							X			X					2
Hungary		X				X	X	X		X		X			6
Iceland							X								1
India								X					X		2
Iran	X	X	X	X	X		X								6
Israel	X					X					X				3
Italy		X		X	X		X			X		X	X	X	8
Japan	X	X	X	X	X	X	X	X	X	X	X	X	X	X	14
Kazakhstan	X		X			X	X	X	X	X		X	X	X	10
Kuwait						X									1
Kyrgyzstan							X						X		2
Latvia			X		X										2
Lebanon							X								1
Libya						X									1
Lithuania	X														1
Luxembourg									X						1
Madagascar	X														1
Malta											X				1
Mexico						X								X	2
Moldova			X												1
Monaco	X														1
Mongolia	X		X	X		X	X		X	X	X		X	X	10
Montenegro				X											1
Morocco	X	X		X	X										4
Mozambique		X													1
Nepal											X				1
Netherlands	X	X		X	X	X	X			X	X	X		X	10
Nigeria													X		1
North Korea	X	X	X					X	X	X	X				7
Peru							X								1
Poland		X	X	X		X	X					X		X	7
Portugal		X	X	X				X	X						5
Puerto Rico				X	X		X								3
Romania						X		X							2
Russia	X	X	X	X	X	X	X	X	X		X	X	X	X	13
Senegal							X		X		X	X			4
Slovakia						X									1
Slovenia	X			X			X				X			X	5
South Africa			X	X	X										3
South Korea	X	X	X	X	X	X	X	X	X	X	X	X	X	X	14
Spain		X			X				X	X		X	X		6
Switzerland					X										1
Tajikistan			X	X	X										3
Togo				X											1
Tunisia				X			X	X		X			X	X	6
Turkey			X												1
Turkmenistan		X										X			2
Ukraine	X		X	X	X		X	X				X	X	X	9
United Arab Emirates			X												1
United States	X	X	X	X	X	X	X	X		X		X			10
Uzbekistan	X	X	X		X	X	X		X					X	8
Venezuela	X	X	X		X	X			X		X				7
Yemen	X														1
Total: 92 NOCs	33	33	32	35	31	32	34	23	22	22	25	22	21	21	385

== Qualification timeline ==
Africa
Event	Date	Venue	Ref.
2006 African Judo Championships	May 29 - Jun 6, 2006	(Mauritius) Port Louis	
2007 All-Africa Games	July 12–14, 2007	(Algeria) Algiers	
2007 Madagascar Tournament	March 17–18, 2007	Madagascar	
2007 Morocco International Tournament	April 7–8, 2007	Morocco	
2007 South Africa International Tournament	May 17–18, 2007	(South Africa) Vanderbijlpark	
2007 Kano Cup	December 7–9, 2007	(Japan) Tokyo	
2007 Women's International Tournament	December 22, 2007	(Japan) Fukuoka	
2008 Mauritius International Tournament	January 28–29, 2008	(Mauritius) Port Louis	
2008 Super World Cup	February 9–11, 2008	(France) Paris	
2008 World Cup Men	February 16–17, 2008	(Austria) Leonding	
2008 World Cup Women	February 16–17, 2008	(Hungary) Budapest	
2008 Super World Cup	February 22–24, 2008	(Germany) Hamburg	
2008 Tunisia International Tournament	March 28–29, 2008	(Tunisia) Tunis	
2008 Cameroon International Tournament	April 26–27, 2008	(Cameroon) Yaoundé	
2008 African Judo Championships	May 15–18, 2008	(Morocco) Agadir	
Asia
Event	Date	Venue	Ref.
2006 Qingdao International Tournament	November 13–14, 2006	(China) Qingdao	
2006 KRA Open	November 17–18, 2006	(South Korea) Seoul	
2006 Asian Games	December 2–5, 2006	(Qatar) Doha	
2006 Women's International Tournament	December 16–17, 2006	(Japan) Fukuoka	
2007 Kazakhstan International Tournament	March 17–18, 2007	(Kazakhstan) Almaty	
2007 Asian Judo Championships	May 16–17, 2007	Kuwait City	
2007 Fajr International Tournament	June 20–22, 2007	(Iran) Tehran	
2007 World Judo Championships	September 13–16, 2007	(Brazil) Rio de Janeiro	
2007 Qingdao International Tournament	November 24–25, 2007	(China) Qingdao	
2007 KRA Open	Nov 30 - Dec 1, 2007	(South Korea) Seoul	
2007 Kano Cup	December 7–9, 2007	(Japan) Tokyo	
2008 Kazakhstan International Tournament	March 16–18, 2008	(Kazakhstan) Almaty	
2008 Asian Judo Championships	April 26–27, 2008	(South Korea) Jeju City	
Europe
Event	Date	Venue	Ref.
2007 European Judo Championships	April 6–8, 2007	(Serbia) Belgrade	
2007 World Cup Men	April 28–29, 2007	(Italy) Rome	
2007 World Cup Women	April 28–29, 2007	(Denmark) Vejen	
2007 Super World Cup	May 5–6, 2007	(Russia) Moscow	
2007 World Cup Men	May 19–20, 2007	(Romania) Bucharest	
2007 World Cup Women	May 19–20, 2007	(Portugal) Lisbon	
2007 World Judo Championships	September 13–16, 2007	(Brazil) Rio de Janeiro	
2007 World Cup Men	September 22–23, 2007	(United Kingdom) Birmingham	
2007 World Cup Women	September 22–23, 2007	(Estonia) Tallinn	
2007 Super World Cup	September 28–30, 2007	(Netherlands) Rotterdam	
2007 World Cup Men	October 13–14, 2008	(Azerbaijan) Baku	
2007 World Cup Women	October 13–14, 2008	(Belarus) Minsk	
2008 World Cup Men	January 26–27, 2008	(Georgia (country)) Tbilisi	
2008 World Cup Women	January 26–27, 2008	(Bulgaria) Sofia	
2008 Super World Cup	February 9–11, 2008	(France) Paris	
2008 World Cup Men	February 16–17, 2008	(Austria) Leonding	
2008 World Cup Women	February 16–17, 2008	(Hungary) Budapest	
2008 Super World Cup	February 22–24, 2008	(Germany) Hamburg	
2008 World Cup Men	March 1–2, 2008	(Czech Republic) Prague	
2008 World Cup Women	March 1–2, 2008	(Poland) Warsaw	
2008 European Judo Championships	April 11–13, 2008	(Portugal) Lisbon	
Oceania
Event	Date	Venue	Ref.
2007 World Judo Championships	September 13–16, 2007	(Brazil) Rio de Janeiro	
2007 OJU Open World Cup	November 10–14, 2007	(Australia) Perth	
2008 Oceania Judo Championships	March 21–23, 2008	(New Zealand) Christchurch	
Pan America
Event	Date	Venue	Ref.
2006 Pan American Judo Championships	May 23–28, 2006	(Argentina) Buenos Aires	
2007 Pan American Judo Championships	May 24–27, 2007	(Canada) Montreal	
2007 Pan-American Games	July 19–22, 2007	(Brazil) Rio de Janeiro	
2007 World Judo Championships	September 13–16, 2007	(Brazil) Rio de Janeiro	
Zone II Qualification Tournament	March 27–30, 2008	(Venezuela) Isla de Margarita	
Zone III Qualification Tournament	April 7–10, 2008	(Argentina) Buenos Aires	
2008 Pan American Judo Championships	May 7–10, 2008	(United States) Miami	
Zone I Qualification Tournament	May 11, 2008	(United States) Miami	

== -60kg Men ==
Competition	Venue	Vacancies	Qualified
Host Nation	-	1	China
World Championships	(Brazil) Rio de Janeiro	6	Netherlands; Georgia; Austria; South Korea; Slovenia; Mongolia
African Judo Union	-	3	Morocco; Madagascar; Algeria
Judo Union of Asia*	-	6	Japan; Iran; Kazakhstan; Uzbekistan; North Korea; Yemen
European Judo Union	-	9	Ukraine; Armenia; Great Britain; Russia; Greece; Czech Republic; Israel; France; Lithuania
Oceania Judo Union	-	1	Australia
Pan-American Judo Union	-	6	Argentina; Venezuela; Canada; Brazil; Cuba; United States
Invitational**	-	1	Monaco
TOTAL		33	

== 60-66kg Men ==
Competition	Venue	Vacancies	Qualified
Host Nation	-	1	China
World Championships	(Brazil) Rio de Janeiro	6	Brazil; Cuba; Iran; Hungary; Armenia; Italy
African Judo Union	-	3	Egypt; Algeria; Morocco
Judo Union of Asia	-	5	South Korea; Turkmenistan; Japan; Uzbekistan; North Korea
European Judo Union	-	9	Georgia; Netherlands; France; Russia; Spain; Greece; Azerbaijan; Poland; Portugal
Oceania Judo Union	-	1	Australia
Pan-American Judo Union	-	6	Ecuador; Venezuela; Canada; Dominican Republic; United States; Chile
Invitational**	-	2	Mozambique; Andorra
TOTAL		33	

== 66-73kg Men ==
Competition	Venue	Vacancies	Qualified
Host Nation	-	1	China
World Championships	(Brazil) Rio de Janeiro	6	South Korea; Azerbaijan; Japan; Tajikistan; Turkey; Georgia
African Judo Union	-	3	Algeria; South Africa; Democratic Republic of the Congo
Judo Union of Asia	-	5	Iran; North Korea; Kazakhstan; Uzbekistan; Mongolia
European Judo Union	-	9	Belgium; Czech Republic; Ukraine; Portugal; Poland; Russia; Moldova; Belarus; Latvia
Oceania Judo Union	-	1	Australia
Pan-American Judo Union	-	6	Brazil; United States; Cuba; Canada; Venezuela; Argentina
Invitational**	-	1	United Arab Emirates
TOTAL		32	

== 73-81kg Men ==
Competition	Venue	Vacancies	Qualified
Host Nation	-	1	China
World Championships	(Brazil) Rio de Janeiro	6	Brazil; France; Great Britain; Netherlands; Italy; Poland
African Judo Union	-	3	Morocco; South Africa; Tunisia
Judo Union of Asia	-	5	South Korea; Mongolia; Japan; Iran; Tajikistan
European Judo Union	-	9	Portugal; Germany; Ukraine; Georgia; Belarus; Russia; Azerbaijan; Slovenia; Montenegro
Oceania Judo Union	-	1	Australia
Pan-American Judo Union	-	6	United States; Cuba; Colombia; Argentina; El Salvador; Puerto Rico
Invitational**	-	4	Equatorial Guinea; Togo; Aruba; Albania
TOTAL		35	

== 81-90kg Men ==
Competition	Venue	Vacancies	Qualified
Host Nation	-	1	China
World Championships	(Brazil) Rio de Janeiro	6	Georgia; Greece; Italy; Russia; Egypt; Netherlands
African Judo Union	-	3	Algeria; Morocco; South Africa
Judo Union of Asia	-	5	Japan; South Korea; Uzbekistan; Iran; Tajikistan
European Judo Union	-	9	Azerbaijan; Belarus; Ukraine; Germany; Switzerland; Spain; France; Great Britain; Latvia
Oceania Judo Union	-	1	Australia
Pan-American Judo Union	-	6	Brazil; Cuba; Venezuela; Argentina; United States; Puerto Rico
Invitational**	-	0	
TOTAL		31	

== 90-100kg Men ==
Competition	Venue	Vacancies	Qualified
Host Nation	-	1	China
World Championships	(Brazil) Rio de Janeiro	6	Brazil; Great Britain; Hungary; Cuba; Georgia; Bosnia and Herzegovina
African Judo Union	-	3	Algeria; Cameroon; Libya
Judo Union of Asia	-	5	Kazakhstan; South Korea; Japan; Uzbekistan; Mongolia
European Judo Union	-	9	Netherlands; Israel; Russia; Poland; Azerbaijan; France; Germany; Slovakia; Romania
Oceania Judo Union	-	1	Australia
Pan-American Judo Union	-	6	Canada; Dominican Republic; Venezuela; Argentina; United States; Mexico
Invitational**	-	1	Kuwait
TOTAL		32	

== +100kg Men ==
Competition	Venue	Vacancies	Qualified
Host Nation	-	1	China
World Championships	(Brazil) Rio de Janeiro	5	France; Russia; Brazil; Georgia; Japan
African Judo Union	-	3	Tunisia; Egypt; Senegal
Judo Union of Asia*	-	6	Uzbekistan; Iran; South Korea; Kazakhstan; Mongolia; Kyrgyzstan
European Judo Union	-	9	Estonia; Belarus; Germany; Italy; Poland; Netherlands; Ukraine; Hungary; Slovenia
Oceania Judo Union	-	1	Australia
Pan-American Judo Union	-	6	Cuba; Peru; Haiti; Puerto Rico; United States; Argentina
Invitational**	-	3	Guam; Iceland; Lebanon
TOTAL		34	

== -48kg Women ==
Competition	Venue	Vacancies	Qualified
Host Nation	-	1	China
World Championships	(Brazil) Rio de Janeiro	6	Japan; Cuba; France; Romania; Argentina; South Korea
African Judo Union	-	2	Tunisia; Algeria
Judo Union of Asia	-	3	North Korea; Kazakhstan; India
European Judo Union	-	5	Russia; Hungary; Germany; Portugal; Ukraine
Oceania Judo Union	-	1	Australia
Pan-American Judo Union	-	3	Brazil; Ecuador; United States
Invitational**	-	2	Burkina Faso; Gabon
TOTAL		23	

== 48-52kg Women ==
Competition	Venue	Vacancies	Qualified
Host Nation	-	1	China
World Championships	(Brazil) Rio de Janeiro	5	Portugal; North Korea; Japan; South Korea; Brazil
African Judo Union	-	2	Algeria; Senegal
Judo Union of Asia*	-	4	Mongolia; Kazakhstan; Chinese Taipei; Uzbekistan
European Judo Union	-	5	Spain; France; Belgium; Germany; Russia
Oceania Judo Union	-	1	Australia
Pan-American Judo Union	-	3	Venezuela; Cuba; Dominican Republic
Invitational**	-	1	Luxembourg
TOTAL		22	

== 52-57kg Women ==
Competition	Venue	Vacancies	Qualified
Host Nation	-	1	China
World Championships	(Brazil) Rio de Janeiro	6	North Korea; Spain; Hungary; Japan; Finland; Italy
African Judo Union	-	2	Algeria; Tunisia
Judo Union of Asia	-	3	South Korea; Mongolia; Kazakhstan
European Judo Union	-	5	Austria; France; Germany; Azerbaijan; Netherlands
Oceania Judo Union	-	1	Australia
Pan-American Judo Union	-	3	Brazil; United States; Cuba
Invitational**	-	1	Haiti
TOTAL		22	

== 57-63kg Women ==
Competition	Venue	Vacancies	Qualified
Host Nation	-	1	China
World Championships	(Brazil) Rio de Janeiro	6	Cuba; France; Japan; Netherlands; Germany; Slovenia
African Judo Union	-	2	Algeria; Senegal
Judo Union of Asia*	-	4	South Korea; North Korea; Mongolia; Chinese Taipei
European Judo Union	-	5	Great Britain; Austria; Russia; Finland; Israel
Oceania Judo Union	-	1	Australia
Pan-American Judo Union	-	3	Argentina; Brazil; Venezuela
Invitational**	-	3	Nepal; Malta; American Samoa
TOTAL		25	

== 63-70kg Women ==
Competition	Venue	Vacancies	Qualified
Host Nation	-	1	China
World Championships	(Brazil) Rio de Janeiro	6	France; United States; Hungary; Italy; Ukraine; Netherlands
African Judo Union	-	2	Algeria; Senegal
Judo Union of Asia	-	3	Japan; South Korea; Kazakhstan
European Judo Union	-	5	Spain; Germany; Russia; Belgium; Poland
Oceania Judo Union	-	1	Fiji
Pan-American Judo Union	-	3	Brazil; Cuba; Colombia
Invitational**	-	1	Turkmenistan
TOTAL		22	

== 70-78kg Women ==
Competition	Venue	Vacancies	Qualified
Host Nation	-	1	China
World Championships	(Brazil) Rio de Janeiro	5	Cuba; Japan; South Korea; France; Italy
African Judo Union	-	2	Tunisia; Nigeria
Judo Union of Asia*	-	4	Mongolia; Kazakhstan; Kyrgyzstan; India
European Judo Union	-	5	Great Britain; Russia; Germany; Spain; Ukraine
Oceania Judo Union	-	1	Australia
Pan-American Judo Union	-	3	Brazil; Canada; Argentina
Invitational**	-	0	
TOTAL		21	

== +78kg Women ==
Competition	Venue	Vacancies	Qualified
Host Nation	-	1	China
World Championships	(Brazil) Rio de Janeiro	5	Japan; Germany; Netherlands; France; Great Britain
African Judo Union	-	2	Tunisia; Egypt
Judo Union of Asia*	-	4	Mongolia; Uzbekistan; South Korea; Kazakhstan
European Judo Union	-	5	Russia; Slovenia; Poland; Ukraine; Italy
Oceania Judo Union	-	1	Australia
Pan-American Judo Union	-	3	Cuba; Ecuador; Mexico
Invitational**	-	0	
TOTAL		21	

* That if an athlete from China finishes in the top 6 at the worlds, their qualification place will go to the Judo union of Asia. also two additional places will be awarded to this union, but gender and weight categories are to be defined.

** 20 invitational places in total.
