= Franciele Nascimento =

Brazilian basketball player (born 1987)

Personal information
- Full name: Franciele Aparecida do Nascimento
- Born: October 19, 1987 (age 38) Jacarezinho, Paraná, Brazil
Medal record
Women's basketball
Representing Brazil
South American Championship
Gold medal – first place	Mendoza 2013	Team competition

Franciele Aparecida do Nascimento (born October 19, 1987 in Jacarezinho, Paraná) is a Brazilian female basketball player. At the 2008 and 2012 Summer Olympics, she competed for the Brazil women's national basketball team in the women's event. She is 6 ft 2 in (1.88 m) tall.
