= Carlos Ertel =

Brazilian handball player (born 1974)

Menta
Personal information
- Full name: Carlos Luciano Ertel
- Born: 19 December 1978 (age 47) Canoas, Rio Grande do Sul, Brazil
- Height: 1.85 m (6 ft 1 in)

Sport
- Sport: Handball
Medal record
Men's handball
Representing Brazil
Pan American Games
Silver medal – second place	1999 Winnipeg	Team
Gold medal – first place	2007 Rio de Janeiro	Team

Carlos Luciano Ertel (born 18 December 1974), also known as Menta, is a Brazilian handball player who competed in the 1996 Summer Olympics and in the 2008 Summer Olympics.

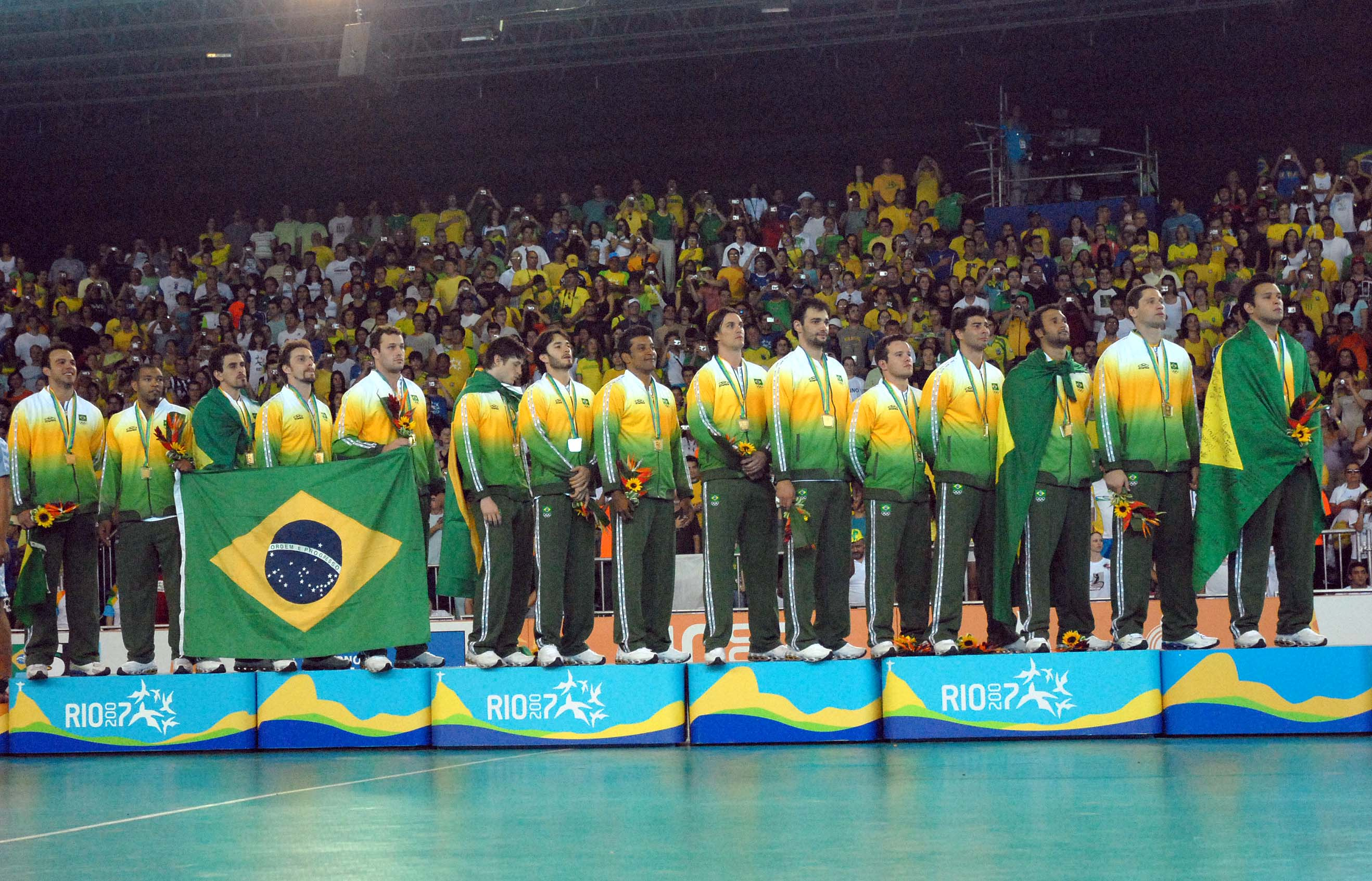
Brazilian men's team on podium after winning gold at 2007 Pan American Games.
