= Micaela Martins Jacintho =

Brazilian basketball player (born 1979)

Micaela Martins Jacintho (born 12 June 1979) is a Brazilian basketball player who competed in the 2008 Summer Olympics.
