= Andréia Rosa =

Brazilian footballer (born 1984)

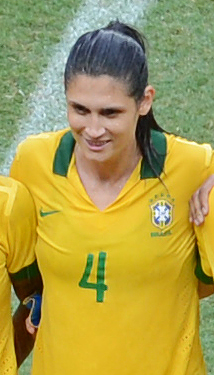
- Playing for Brazil in 2013

Personal information
- Full name: Andréia Rosa de Andrade
- Date of birth: 8 July 1984 (age 42)
- Place of birth: São Lourenço do Turvo, São Paulo, Brazil
- Height: 1.72 m (5 ft 8 in)
- Position: Defender

Senior career*
Years	Team	Apps	(Gls)
2001–2012	Ferroviária		
2007	→ Saad (loan)		
2012–2013	Centro Olímpico		
2013–2018	Avaldsnes	72	(8)

International career^{‡}
2006–	Brazil	21	(0)
Medal record
Women's Football
Representing Brazil
Olympic Games
Silver medal – second place	2008 Beijing	Team Competition
- * Club domestic league appearances and goals as of 19:47, 13 August 2018 (UTC) ‡ National team caps and goals as of 22:49, 17 December 2014 (UTC)

Andréia Rosa de Andrade (born July 8, 1984), known as Andréia Rosa, (Note: The "Rosa" distinguishes her from her Brazilian international teammate Andréia Suntaque, who is typically known simply as Andréia.) is a Brazilian football defender who plays for the Brazilian women's national team and the Norwegian Toppserien club Avaldsnes.

== Club career ==
At the time of her call-up for the 2008 Olympics, Andréia Rosa had played in 181 games for Ferroviária. In those matches she had scored 42 goals from her centre-back position and been sent off only once. In 2007, she was loaned to Saad for the inaugural Copa do Brasil de Futebol Feminino, which Ferroviária did not enter.

In summer 2013 Andréia Rosa joined ambitious Norwegian club Avaldsnes, where she joined compatriots Rosana and Debinha.

== International career ==
In November 2006 Andréia Rosa made her international debut in Brazil's 6–1 South American Women's Football Championship win over Bolivia at Estadio José María Minella, Mar del Plata. In July 2008 she was involved in a "violent collision" with Abby Wambach during the first half of a friendly match in San Diego. Wambach suffered a broken tibia and fibula, requiring a titanium rod to be inserted into her left leg.

Andréia Rosa was included in Brazil's 18-player squad for the 2008 Beijing Olympics and started the team's first match; a 0–0 draw with Germany at Shenyang Olympic Sports Center Stadium. Although she took no further part in the competition, she won a silver medal when Brazil lost the final 1–0 after extra time to the United States.

She narrowly missed selection for the Brazilian FIFA Women's World Cup squad in both 2007 and 2011.

In October 2017 Andréia Rosa was one of five Brazil players to quit international football, disgruntled at pay and conditions, and the Brazilian Football Confederation's sacking of head coach Emily Lima.

== Personal life ==
She was born in São Pedro do Turvo, São Paulo, Brazil. Andréia Rosa is a qualified physical education teacher and an Evangelical Christian.
