= Silvio Laureano =

Brazilian handball player (born 1981)

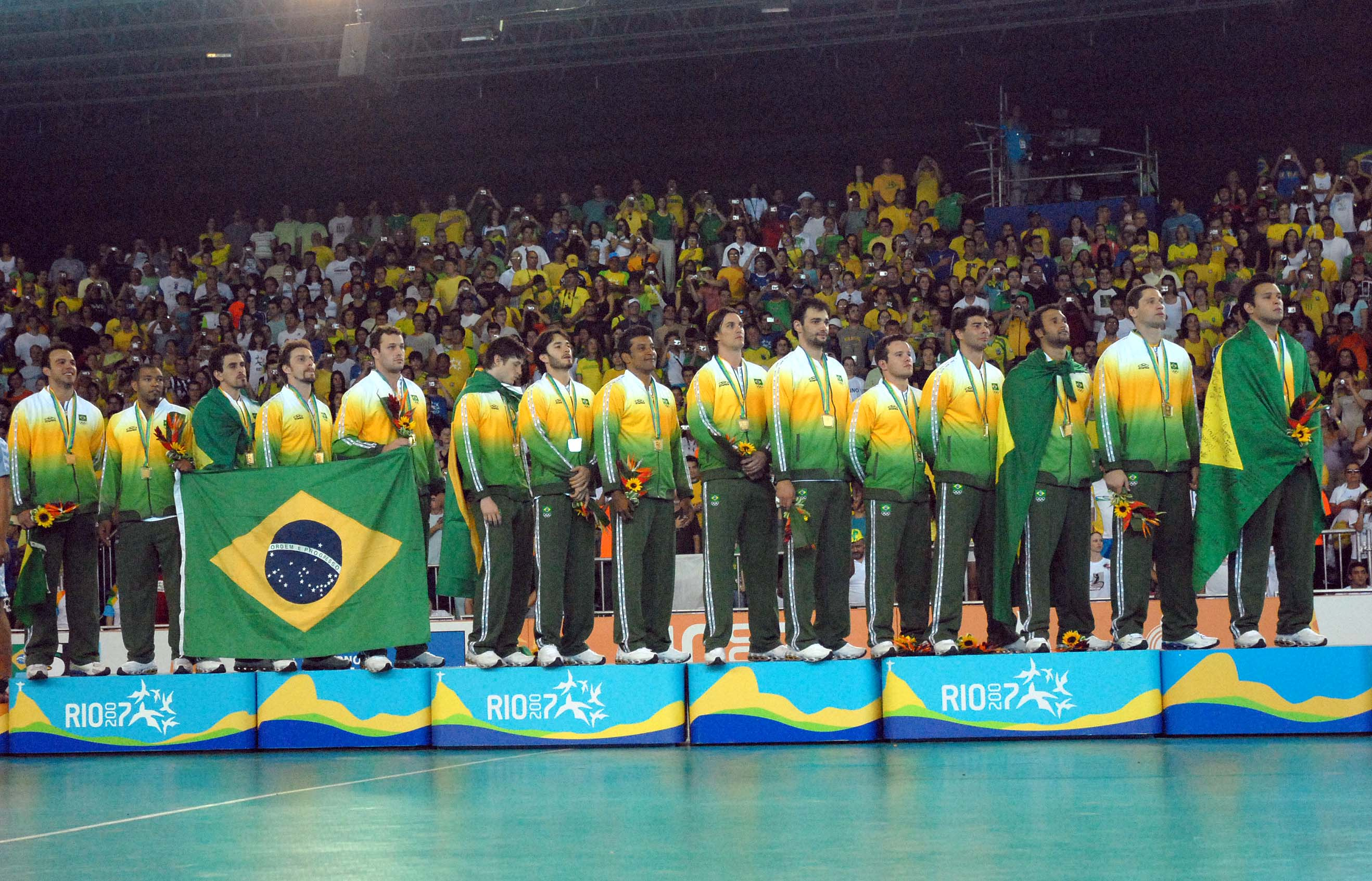
On the podium after winning gold at the 2007 Pan American Games

Silvio Laureano (born 19 April 1981) is a Brazilian handball player who competed in the 2008 Summer Olympics.
