= Soeli Garvão Zakrzeski =

Brazilian basketball player (born 1977)

Personal information
- Born: 12 November 1977 (age 47); Medianeira, Brazil

Sport
- Sport: Basketball

Soeli Garvão Zakrzeski (born 12 November 1977) is a Brazilian basketball player. She competed in the women's tournament at the 2008 Summer Olympics.
