= Alê Rodrigues =

Brazilian handball player (born 1980)

Alexandre Rodrigues da Silva (born 11 December 1980) is a Brazilian handball player who competed in the 2008 Summer Olympics.
