= Switzerland at the 2004 Summer Olympics =

- IOC code: SUI
- NOC: Swiss Olympic Association
- Website: www.swissolympic.ch (in German and French)

in Athens
- Competitors: 98 in 18 sports
- Flag bearer: Roger Federer
- Medals Ranked 46th: Gold 1 Silver 1 Bronze 3 Total 5

Summer Olympics appearances (overview)
- 1896; 1900; ~~1904~~; 1908; 1912; 1920; 1924; 1928; 1932; 1936; 1948; 1952; 1956; 1960; 1964; 1968; 1972; 1976; 1980; 1984; 1988; 1992; 1996; 2000; 2004; 2008; 2012; 2016; 2020; 2024; 2028

Other related appearances
- 1906 Intercalated Games

Switzerland competed at the 2004 Summer Olympics in Athens, Greece, from 13 to 29 August 2004. Swiss athletes competed at every Summer Olympic Games in the modern era, except when they boycotted the 1956 Summer Olympics in Melbourne as a protest to the Soviet invasion of Hungary. The Swiss Olympic Association sent a total of 98 athletes to the Games, 59 men and 39 women, to compete in 18 sports.

== Medalists ==
Medal	Name	Sport	Event	Date
Gold	Marcel Fischer	Fencing	Men's individual épée	August 17
Silver	Franco Marvulli; Bruno Risi	Cycling	Men's madison	August 25
Bronze	Karin Thürig	Cycling	Women's road time trial	August 18
Bronze	Sven Riederer	Triathlon	Men's event	August 25
Bronze	Patrick Heuscher; Stefan Kobel	Volleyball	Men's beach volleyball	August 25

== Athletics ==
Swiss athletes have so far achieved qualifying standards in the following athletics events (up to a maximum of 3 athletes in each event at the 'A' Standard, and 1 at the 'B' Standard).

Key

- Note–Ranks given for track events are within the athlete's heat only
- Q = Qualified for the next round
- q = Qualified for the next round as a fastest loser or, in field events, by position without achieving the qualifying target
- NR = National record
- N/A = Round not applicable for the event
- Bye = Athlete not required to compete in round

Men
Track & road events

Athlete	Event	Heat		Semifinal		Final	
Athlete	Event	Result	Rank	Result	Rank	Result	Rank
Christian Belz	5000 m	13:29.59	12	—N/a		Did not advance	
André Bucher	800 m	1:47.34	3	Did not advance			
Cedric El Idrissi	400 m hurdles	49.44	6	Did not advance			
Viktor Röthlin	Marathon	—N/a				DNF	

Field events

Athlete	Event	Qualification		Final	
Athlete	Event	Distance	Position	Distance	Position
Patric Suter	Hammer throw	73.54	23	Did not advance	

Women
Track & road events

Athlete	Event	Heat		Semifinal		Final	
Athlete	Event	Result	Rank	Result	Rank	Result	Rank
Anita Bragger	800 m	2:04.00	4	Did not advance			
Marie Polli	20 km walk	—N/a				1:37:53	39

Field events

Athlete	Event	Qualification		Final	
Athlete	Event	Distance	Position	Distance	Position
Corinne Muller	High jump	1.89	23	Did not advance	
Nadine Rohr	Pole vault	4.15	24	Did not advance	

== Canoeing ==
=== Slalom ===
Athlete	Event	Preliminary						Semifinal		Final			
Athlete	Event	Run 1	Rank	Run 2	Rank	Total	Rank	Time	Rank	Time	Rank	Total	Rank
Ronnie Dürrenmatt	Men's C-1	103.91	8	102.55	5	206.46	8 Q	102.52	11	Did not advance			
Michael Kurt	Men's K-1	94.30	4	92.49	1	186.79	1 Q	103.20	20	Did not advance			
Nagwa El Desouki	Women's K-1	118.38	12	110.27	5	228.65	10 Q	113.24	9 Q	111.80	5	225.04	6

=== Sprint ===
Athlete	Event	Heats		Semifinals		Final	
Athlete	Event	Time	Rank	Time	Rank	Time	Rank
Simon Fäh	Men's K-1 500 m	1:42.415	7 q	1:41.039	5	Did not advance	
Simon Fäh	Men's K-1 1000 m	3:41.392	6 q	3:37.569	8 Q	Did not advance	

Qualification Legend: Q = Qualify to final; q = Qualify to semifinal

== Cycling ==
=== Road ===
Men

Athlete	Event	Time	Rank
Rubens Bertogliati	Road race	Did not finish	
Rubens Bertogliati	Time trial	1:02:16.56	27
Fabian Cancellara	Road race	Did not finish	
Fabian Cancellara	Time trial	59:42.38	10
Martin Elmiger	Road race	5:41:56	29
Grégory Rast	Road race	Did not finish	
Markus Zberg	Road race	5:41:56	12

Women

Athlete	Event	Time	Rank
Nicole Brändli	Road race	3:38:39	38
Priska Doppmann	Road race	3:25:42	18
Priska Doppmann	Time trial	32:40.47	9
Barbara Heeb	Road race	3:25:42	28
Karin Thürig	Time trial	31:54.89	3rd place, bronze medalist(s)

=== Track ===
Pursuit

Athlete	Event	Qualification		Semifinals		Final	
Athlete	Event	Time	Rank	Opponent Results	Rank	Opponent Results	Rank
Karin Thürig	Women's individual pursuit	3:34.746	6 Q	van Moorsel (NED); 3:34.831	5	Did not advance	

Omnium

Athlete	Event	Points	Laps	Rank
Franco Marvulli; Bruno Risi	Men's madison	15	0	2nd place, silver medalist(s)

=== Mountain biking ===
Athlete	Event	Time	Rank
Thomas Frischknecht	Men's cross-country	2:19:39	7
Ralf Näf	Men's cross-country	2:19:15	6
Christoph Sauser	Men's cross-country	Did not finish	
Barbara Blatter	Women's cross-country	Did not finish	
Katrin Leumann	Women's cross-country	2:16:07	19

== Diving ==
Men

Athlete	Events	Preliminaries		Semifinals		Final	
Athlete	Events	Points	Rank	Points	Rank	Points	Rank
Jean Romain Delaloye	10 m platform	326.82	31	Did not advance			

== Equestrian ==
=== Dressage ===
Athlete	Horse	Event	Grand Prix		Grand Prix Special		Grand Prix Freestyle		Overall	
Athlete	Horse	Event	Score	Rank	Score	Rank	Score	Rank	Score	Rank
Silvia Iklé	Salieri CH	Individual	67.042	28 Q	69.101	18	Did not advance			
Christian Pläge	Regent	Individual	66.667	30	Did not advance					
Daniel Ramseier	Palladio	Individual	63.250	45	Did not advance					
Jasmien Sanche-Burger	Mr G de Lully	Individual	Withdrew		Did not advance					
Silvia Iklé; Christian Pläge; Daniel Ramseier; Jasmien Sanche-Burger	See above	Team	—N/a						65.653	10

=== Eventing ===
Athlete	Horse	Event	Dressage		Cross-country			Jumping						Total	
Athlete	Horse	Event	Dressage		Cross-country			Qualifier			Final			Total	
Athlete	Horse	Event	Penalties	Rank	Penalties	Total	Rank	Penalties	Total	Rank	Penalties	Total	Rank	Penalties	Rank
Marisa Cortesi	Peppermint III	Individual	48.40	26	111.00	159.40	68	12.00	171.40	58	Did not advance			171.40	58
Jennifer Eicher	Agent Mulder	Individual	65.00	57	0.00	65.00	=33	12.00	77.00	=33	Did not advance			77.00	=33

=== Show jumping ===
Athlete	Horse	Event	Qualification								Final					Total	
Athlete	Horse	Event	Round 1		Round 2			Round 3			Round A		Round B			Total	
Athlete	Horse	Event	Penalties	Rank	Penalties	Total	Rank	Penalties	Total	Rank	Penalties	Rank	Penalties	Total	Rank	Penalties	Rank
Fabio Crotta	Mme Pompadour M	Individual	5	=31	8	13	=33 Q	4	17	=21 Q	16	=36	Did not advance				
Steve Guerdat	Olympic	Individual	4	=19	4	8	=16 Q	13	21	=33 Q	Retired		Did not advance				
Markus Fuchs	Tinka's Boy	Individual	6	=42	20	26	=55 Q	2	28	=41	Did not advance						
Christina Liebherr	No Mercy	Individual	9	=54	0	9	=23 Q	8	17	=21 Q	8	=12 Q	9	17	14	17	14
Fabio Crotta; Markus Fuchs; Steve Guerdat; Christina Liebherr	See above	Team	—N/a								12	=4 Q	14	26	5	26	5

== Fencing ==
Men

Athlete	Event	Round of 64	Round of 32	Round of 16	Quarterfinal	Semifinal	Final / BM	
Athlete	Event	Opposition Score	Opposition Score	Opposition Score	Opposition Score	Opposition Score	Opposition Score	Rank
Marcel Fischer	Individual épée	Bye	Nabil (EGY); W 15–10	Kovács (HUN); W 15–7	Fernández (VEN); W 15–13	Boisse (FRA); W 15–9	Wang L (CHN); W 15–9	1st place, gold medalist(s)

== Gymnastics ==
=== Artistic ===
Men

Athlete	Event	Qualification								Final							
Athlete	Event	Apparatus						Total	Rank	Apparatus						Total	Rank
Athlete	Event	F	PH	R	V	PB	HB	Total	Rank	F	PH	R	V	PB	HB	Total	Rank
Christoph Schärer	Floor	8.787	—N/a					8.787	72	Did not advance							
Christoph Schärer	Pommel horse	—N/a	8.650	—N/a				8.650	74	Did not advance							
Christoph Schärer	Parallel bars	—N/a				8.737	—N/a	8.737	69	Did not advance							
Christoph Schärer	Horizontal bar	—N/a					9.650	9.650	26	Did not advance							
Andreas Schweizer	All-around	8.787	9.200	9.737 Q	9.100	9.387	9.225	55.436	27 Q	8.450	9.062	9.675	9.225	9.450	8.750	54.612	24
Andreas Schweizer	Rings	—N/a		9.737	—N/a			9.737	8 Q	—N/a		9.737	—N/a			9.737	8

Women

Athlete	Event	Qualification						Final					
Athlete	Event	Apparatus				Total	Rank	Apparatus				Total	Rank
Athlete	Event	V	UB	BB	F	Total	Rank	V	UB	BB	F	Total	Rank
Melanie Marti	All-around	9.112	9.050	8.525	9.050	27.037	43	Did not advance					

=== Trampoline ===
Athlete	Event	Qualification		Final	
Athlete	Event	Score	Rank	Score	Rank
Ludovic Martin	Men's	66.80	9	Did not advance	

== Judo ==
Athlete	Event	Round of 32	Round of 16	Quarterfinals	Semifinals	Repechage 1	Repechage 2	Repechage 3	Final / BM	
Athlete	Event	Opposition Result	Opposition Result	Opposition Result	Opposition Result	Opposition Result	Opposition Result	Opposition Result	Opposition Result	Rank
Sergei Aschwanden	Men's −81 kg	Sganga (ARG); L 0002–1000	Did not advance							
Lena Göldi	Women's −57 kg	Pekli (AUS); W 1000–0000	Ekuta (NGR); W 1010–0000	Lupetey (CUB); L 0000–0001	Did not advance	Bye	Harel (FRA); L WO	Did not advance		

== Modern pentathlon ==
Switzerland has qualified a single athlete in modern pentathlon.

Athlete	Event	Shooting (10 m air pistol)			Fencing (épée one touch)			Swimming (200 m freestyle)			Riding (show jumping)			Running (3000 m)			Total points	Final rank
Athlete	Event	Points	Rank	MP Points	Results	Rank	MP points	Time	Rank	MP points	Penalties	Rank	MP points	Time	Rank	MP Points	Total points	Final rank
Niklaus Brünisholz	Men's	180	9	1096	14–17	=19	776	2:09.12	19	1252	196	25	1004	9:46.75	8	1056	5184	14

== Rowing ==
Men

Athlete	Event	Heats		Repechage		Semifinals		Final	
Athlete	Event	Time	Rank	Time	Rank	Time	Rank	Time	Rank
André Vonarburg	Single sculls	7:23.43	2 R	6:53.48	1 SA/B/C	7:08.52	4 FB	6:52.88	8
Olivier Gremaud; Christian Stofer; Florian Stofer; Simon Stürm	Quadruple sculls	6:20.67	5 R	5:47.94	2 SA/B	5:48.74	6 FB	6:04.53	8

Women

Athlete	Event	Heats		Repechage		Semifinals		Final	
Athlete	Event	Time	Rank	Time	Rank	Time	Rank	Time	Rank
Carolina Lüthi	Single sculls	7:49.88	2 R	7:37.90	3 SC/D	7:47.33	4 FC	7:44.11	15

Qualification Legend: FA=Final A (medal); FB=Final B (non-medal); FC=Final C (non-medal); FD=Final D (non-medal); FE=Final E (non-medal); FF=Final F (non-medal); SA/B=Semifinals A/B; SC/D=Semifinals C/D; SE/F=Semifinals E/F; R=Repechage

== Sailing ==
Men

Athlete	Event	Race											Net points	Final rank
Athlete	Event	1	2	3	4	5	6	7	8	9	10	M*	Net points	Final rank
Richard Stauffacher	Mistral	24	13	14	25	~~OCS~~	22	24	20	22	23	OCS	222	24
Simon Brügger; Lukas Erni	470	20	25	18	20	6	24	20	~~27~~	11	15	4	163	22
Flavio Marazzi; Enrico De Maria	Star	10	1	3	7	9	9	~~12~~	11	4	8	9	70	4

Women

Athlete	Event	Race											Net points	Final rank
Athlete	Event	1	2	3	4	5	6	7	8	9	10	M*	Net points	Final rank
Anja Käser	Mistral	14	12	10	10	~~OCS~~	7	15	13	12	18	10	121	14

Open

Athlete	Event	Race																Net points	Final rank
Athlete	Event	1	2	3	4	5	6	7	8	9	10	11	12	13	14	15	M*	Net points	Final rank
Christopher Rast; Christian Steiger	49er	11	9	12	2	~~OCS~~	7	16	16	3	10	10	~~16~~	7	16	9	9	137	12

M = Medal race; OCS = On course side of the starting line; DSQ = Disqualified; DNF = Did not finish; DNS= Did not start; RDG = Redress given

== Shooting ==
Men

Athlete	Event	Qualification		Final	
Athlete	Event	Points	Rank	Points	Rank
Marcel Bürge	10 m air rifle	576	47	Did not advance	
Marcel Bürge	50 m rifle prone	594	=9	Did not advance	
Marcel Bürge	50 m rifle 3 positions	1158	18	Did not advance	
Niki Marty	25 m rapid fire pistol	577	12	Did not advance	

Women

Athlete	Event	Qualification		Final	
Athlete	Event	Points	Rank	Points	Rank
Gaby Bühlmann	10 m air rifle	575	=13	Did not advance	
Gaby Bühlmann	50 m rifle 3 positions	391	=27	Did not advance	
Cornelia Frölich	10 m air pistol	384	=6 Q	481.5	7
Cornelia Frölich	25 m pistol	557	34	Did not advance	
Monika Rieder	10 m air pistol	366	=38	Did not advance	
Monika Rieder	25 m pistol	568	29	Did not advance	

== Swimming ==
Swiss swimmers earned qualifying standards in the following events (up to a maximum of 2 swimmers in each event at the A-standard time, and 1 at the B-standard time):

Men

Athlete	Event	Heat		Semifinal		Final	
Athlete	Event	Time	Rank	Time	Rank	Time	Rank
Remo Lütolf	100 m breaststroke	1:03.82	34	Did not advance			
Dominik Meichtry	200 m freestyle	1:49.45 NR	11 Q	1:50.02	14	Did not advance	
Karel Novy	50 m freestyle	22.51	13 Q	22.63	16	Did not advance	
Karel Novy	100 m freestyle	49.93	22	Did not advance			
Yves Platel	400 m individual medley	4:28.94	29	—N/a		Did not advance	

Women

Athlete	Event	Heat		Semifinal		Final	
Athlete	Event	Time	Rank	Time	Rank	Time	Rank
Dominique Diezi	50 m freestyle	DNS		Did not advance			
Dominique Diezi	100 m freestyle	56.67	=26	Did not advance			
Hanna Miluska	200 m freestyle	2:03.28	24	Did not advance			
Flavia Rigamonti	800 m freestyle	8:38.10	13	—N/a		Did not advance	
Dominique Diezi; Seraina Prünte; Marjorie Sagne; Nicole Zahnd	4 × 100 m freestyle relay	3:48.61	15	—N/a		Did not advance	
Hanna Miluska; Flavia Rigamonti; Chantal Strasser; Nicole Zahnd	4 × 200 m freestyle relay	8:10.41	12	—N/a		Did not advance	
Dominique Diezi; Carmela Schlegel; Carla Stampfli; Nicole Zahnd	4 × 100 m medley relay	4:15.54	15	—N/a		Did not advance	

== Synchronized swimming ==
Switzerland has qualified a spot in the women's duet.

Athlete	Event	Technical routine		Free routine (preliminary)			Free routine (final)		
Athlete	Event	Points	Rank	Points	Total (technical + free)	Rank	Points	Total (technical + free)	Rank
Magdalena Brunner; Belinda Schmid	Duet	45.334	11	46.000	91.334	11 Q	46.084	91.418	10

== Tennis ==
Athlete	Event	Round of 64	Round of 32	Round of 16	Quarterfinals	Semifinals	Final / BM	
Athlete	Event	Opposition Score	Opposition Score	Opposition Score	Opposition Score	Opposition Score	Opposition Score	Rank
Roger Federer	Men's singles	Davydenko (RUS); W 6–3, 5–7, 6–1	Berdych (CZE); L 6–4, 5–7, 5–7	Did not advance				
Yves Allegro; Roger Federer	Men's doubles	—N/a	Fyrstenberg / Matkowski (POL); W 6–3, 6–2	Bhupathi / Paes (IND); L 6–7^{(5–7)}, 3–6	Did not advance			
Myriam Casanova	Women's singles	Pratt (AUS); L 3–6, 5–7	Did not advance					
Patty Schnyder	Women's singles	Mandula (HUN); W 6–3, 6–4	Hantuchová (SVK); W 3–6, 6–1, 6–4	Kuznetsova (RUS); L 3–6, 3–6	Did not advance			
Myriam Casanova; Patty Schnyder	Women's doubles	—N/a	Hantuchová / Husárová (SVK); W 6–3, 6–4	Yan Z / Zheng J (CHN); L 3–6, 3–6	Did not advance			

== Triathlon ==
Switzerland has qualified five athletes in both men's and women's triathlon.

Athlete	Event	Swim (1.5 km)	Trans 1	Bike (40 km)	Trans 2	Run (10 km)	Total Time	Rank
Reto Hug	Men's	18:19	0:18	1:05:37	0:18	37:44	2:01:40.43	40
Olivier Marceau	Men's	18:18	0:18	1:00:46	0:20	33:40	1:52:44.36	8
Sven Riederer	Men's	18:17	0:17	1:00:45	0:20	32:31	1:51:33.26	3rd place, bronze medalist(s)
Brigitte McMahon	Women's	19:46	0:19	1:10:41	0:21	36:40	2:07:07.73	10
Nicola Spirig	Women's	20:34	0:20	1:09:51	0:21	38:19	2:08:44.46	19

== Volleyball ==
=== Beach ===
Athlete	Event	Preliminary round	Standing	Round of 16	Quarterfinals	Semifinals	Final	
Athlete	Event	Opposition Score	Standing	Opposition Score	Opposition Score	Opposition Score	Opposition Score	Rank
Patrick Heuscher; Stefan Kobel	Men's	Pool E Child – Heese (CAN); W 2 – 0 (28–26, 21–18); Prosser – Williams (AUS); W 2 – 1 (16–21, 22–20, 15–9); Blanton – Nygaard (USA); W 2 – 1 (21–16, 13–21, 15–13)	1 Q	Brenha – Maia (POR); W 2 – 0 (21–18, 21–19)	Holdren – Metzger (USA); W 2 – 0 (21–16, 21–19)	Rego – Santos (BRA); L 1 – 2 (14–21, 21–19, 12–15)	Prosser – Williams (AUS); W 2 – 1 (19–21, 21–17, 15–13)	3rd place, bronze medalist(s)
Martin Laciga; Paul Laciga	Men's	Pool C Gartmayer – Nowotny (AUT); W 2 – 0 (21–14, 21–14); Bosma – Herrera (ESP); L 1 – 2 (19–21, 21–17, 9–15); Berger – Gosch (AUT); W 2 – 0 (21–17, 21–19)	2 Q	Araújo – Insfran (BRA); W 2 – 1 (21–19, 19–21, 15–12)	Rego – Santos (BRA); L 0 – 2 (13–21, 16–21)	Did not advance		
Simone Kuhn; Nicole Schnyder	Women's	Pool D Dumont – Martin (CAN); L 0 – 2 (16–21, 13–21); Glesnes – Maaseide (NOR); L 1 – 2 (18–21, 21–17, 13–15); McPeak – Youngs (USA); L 1 – 2 (24–22, 17–21, 12–15)	4	Did not advance				

== Wrestling ==
Key:

- VT – Victory by Fall.
- PP – Decision by Points – the loser with technical points.
- PO – Decision by Points – the loser without technical points.

Men's freestyle

Athlete	Event	Elimination Pool			Quarterfinal	Semifinal	Final / BM	
Athlete	Event	Opposition Result	Opposition Result	Rank	Opposition Result	Opposition Result	Opposition Result	Rank
Rolf Scherrer	−96 kg	Tasoyev (UKR); L 1–3 ^{PP}	Gatsalov (RUS); L 1–3 ^{PP}	2	Did not advance			16

Men's Greco-Roman

Athlete	Event	Elimination Pool			Quarterfinal	Semifinal	Final / BM	
Athlete	Event	Opposition Result	Opposition Result	Rank	Opposition Result	Opposition Result	Opposition Result	Rank
Reto Bucher	−74 kg	Kikiniou (BLR); W 3–1 ^{PP}	Sai Yj (CHN); W 3–1 ^{PP}	1 Q	Khalimov (KAZ); W 3–0 ^{PO}	Yli-Hannuksela (FIN); L 0–3 ^{PO}	Samurgashev (RUS); L 0–4 ^{ST}	4

== See also ==
- Switzerland at the 2004 Summer Paralympics
