= Portugal at the 2004 Summer Olympics =

- IOC code: POR
- NOC: Olympic Committee of Portugal
- Website: www.comiteolimpicoportugal.pt (in Portuguese)

in Athens
- Competitors: 81 in 15 sports
- Flag bearers: Nuno Delgado (opening); Emanuel Silva (closing)
- Medals Ranked 60th: Gold 0 Silver 2 Bronze 1 Total 3

Summer Olympics appearances (overview)
- 1912; 1920; 1924; 1928; 1932; 1936; 1948; 1952; 1956; 1960; 1964; 1968; 1972; 1976; 1980; 1984; 1988; 1992; 1996; 2000; 2004; 2008; 2012; 2016; 2020; 2024; 2028

Portugal competed at the 2004 Summer Olympics in Athens, Greece, from 13 to 29 August 2004. Portuguese athletes have competed at every Summer Olympic Games in the modern era since 1912. The Olympic Committee of Portugal sent the nation's second-largest team to the Games. A total of 81 athletes, 64 men and 17 women, were selected by the committee to participate in 15 sports. Men's football was the only team-based sport in which Portugal had its representation at these Games. There was only a single competitor in badminton, canoeing, equestrian, artistic and trampoline gymnastics, triathlon, and wrestling, which made its official Olympic comeback after an eight-year absence.

Twenty-four Portuguese athletes had previously competed in Sydney, including two returning Olympic medalists: long-distance runner and former champion Fernanda Ribeiro and lightweight judoka Nuno Delgado, who later became the nation's flag bearer in the opening ceremony. Mistral windsurfer and multiple-time European champion João Rodrigues and middle-distance runner Carla Sacramento shared their experiences at these Games as the only athletes who made their fourth Olympic appearance. Equestrian rider Carlos Grave, aged 46, was the oldest athlete of the team, while breaststroke swimmer Diana Gomes was the youngest at age 15. Among the Portuguese athletes on the team, two of them had acquired dual citizenship to compete for Portugal: former hurdler Naide Gomes from São Tomé and Príncipe in the women's heptathlon, and sprinter Francis Obikwelu on his third Olympic bid after he previously joined the Nigerian squad in Atlanta and Sydney.

Portugal left Athens with only three Olympic medals, two silver and one bronze, improving the nation's stark medal tally from Sydney four years earlier. The highlight of the Games for the Portuguese team came on the first day with a historic milestone for Sérgio Paulinho, as the nation's first-ever cyclist to claim a silver medal in the men's road race. The remaining medals were awarded to the athletes in the track and field. On August 22, 2004, Obikwelu challenged the Americans in the men's 100 metres, but he managed to settle only for the silver. Meanwhile, Rui Silva added another medal for Portugal with a blistering bronze in the men's 1500 metres, which was dominated by Morocco's Hicham El Guerrouj.

== Medalists ==
Medal	Name	Sport	Event	Date
Silver	Francis Obikwelu	Athletics	Men's 100 m	August 22
Silver	Sérgio Paulinho	Cycling	Men's road race	August 14
Bronze	Rui Silva	Athletics	Men's 1500 m	August 24

== Athletics ==
Portuguese athletes have so far achieved qualifying standards in the following athletics events (up to a maximum of 3 athletes in each event at the 'A' Standard, and 1 at the 'B' Standard).

Key

- Note–Ranks given for track events are within the athlete's heat only
- Q = Qualified for the next round
- q = Qualified for the next round as a fastest loser or, in field events, by position without achieving the qualifying target
- NR = National record
- N/A = Round not applicable for the event
- Bye = Athlete not required to compete in round

Men
Track & road events

Athlete	Event	Heat		Quarterfinal		Semifinal		Final	
Athlete	Event	Result	Rank	Result	Rank	Result	Rank	Result	Rank
Alberto Chaíça	Marathon	—N/a						2:14:17	8
Jorge Costa	50 km walk	—N/a						4:12:24	34
Manuel Damião	1500 m	3:39.94	8 q	—N/a		3:37.16	8	Did not advance	
Pedro Martins	50 km walk	—N/a						DNF	
Edivaldo Monteiro	400 m hurdles	49.53	4 q	—N/a		49.26	7	Did not advance	
Francis Obikwelu	100 m	10.09	1 Q	9.93 NR	1 Q	9.97	2 Q	9.86 NR	2nd place, silver medalist(s)
Francis Obikwelu	200 m	20.40	2 Q	20.33	1 Q	20.36	2 Q	20.14	5
João Pires	800 m	1:46.71	6	—N/a		Did not advance			
Luís Sá	110 m hurdles	14.01	8	Did not advance					
Manuel Silva	3000 m steeplechase	8:38.31	11	—N/a				Did not advance	
Rui Silva	1500 m	3:37.98	2 Q	—N/a		3:40.99	2 Q	3:34.68	3rd place, bronze medalist(s)
João Vieira	20 km walk	—N/a						1:22:19	10

Field events

Athlete	Event	Qualification		Final	
Athlete	Event	Distance	Position	Distance	Position
Gaspar Araújo	Long jump	7.49	33	Did not advance	
Vítor Costa	Hammer throw	72.47	27	Did not advance	
Nelson Évora	Triple jump	15.72	40	Did not advance	

Women
Track & road events

Athlete	Event	Heat		Semifinal		Final	
Athlete	Event	Result	Rank	Result	Rank	Result	Rank
Ana Dias	Marathon	—N/a				3:08:11	62
Susana Feitor	20 km walk	—N/a				1:32:47	20
Maribel Gonçalves	20 km walk	—N/a				1:33:59	26
Inês Henriques	20 km walk	—N/a				1:33:53	25
Inês Monteiro	5000 m	16:03.75	18	—N/a		Did not advance	
Fernanda Ribeiro	10000 m	—N/a				DNF	
Carla Sacramento	1500 m	4:07.73	8 q	4:10.85	10	Did not advance	
Helena Sampaio	Marathon	—N/a				2:49:18	47
Nédia Semedo	800 m	2:02.61	5	Did not advance			

Field events

Athlete	Event	Qualification		Final	
Athlete	Event	Distance	Position	Distance	Position
Teresa Machado	Discus throw	58.47	23	Did not advance	
Vânia Silva	Hammer throw	63.81	34	Did not advance	

Combined events – Heptathlon

Athlete	Event	100H	HJ	SP	200 m	LJ	JT	800 m	Final	Rank
Naide Gomes	Result	13.58	1.85	14.71	25.46	6.10	40.75	2:20.05	6151	13
Naide Gomes	Points	1039	1041	841	845	880	682	823	6151	13

== Badminton ==
Athlete	Event	Round of 32	Round of 16	Quarterfinal	Semifinal	Final / BM	
Athlete	Event	Opposition Score	Opposition Score	Opposition Score	Opposition Score	Opposition Score	Rank
Marco Vasconcelos	Men's singles	Vaughan (GBR); L 5–15, 5–15	Did not advance				

== Canoeing ==
=== Sprint ===
Athlete	Event	Heats		Semifinals		Final	
Athlete	Event	Time	Rank	Time	Rank	Time	Rank
Emanuel Silva	Men's K-1 500 m	1:40.067	4 q	1:43.051	7	Did not advance	
Emanuel Silva	Men's K-1 1000 m	3:29.854	3 q	3:29.942	3 Q	3:33.862	7

Qualification Legend: Q = Qualify to final; q = Qualify to semifinal

== Cycling ==
=== Road ===
Athlete	Event	Time	Rank
Gonçalo Amorim	Men's road race	Did not finish	
Cândido Barbosa	Men's road race	Did not finish	
Sérgio Paulinho	Men's road race	5:41:45	2nd place, silver medalist(s)
Sérgio Paulinho	Men's time trial	1:01:25.63	25
Nuno Ribeiro	Men's road race	5:41:56	27

== Equestrian ==
=== Eventing ===
Athlete	Horse	Event	Dressage		Cross-country			Jumping						Total	
Athlete	Horse	Event	Dressage		Cross-country			Qualifier			Final			Total	
Athlete	Horse	Event	Penalties	Rank	Penalties	Total	Rank	Penalties	Total	Rank	Penalties	Total	Rank	Penalties	Rank
Carlos Grave	Laughton Hills	Individual	72.80	70	12.80	85.60	49	11.00	96.60	46	Did not advance			96.60	46

== Fencing ==
Men

Athlete	Event	Round of 64	Round of 32	Round of 16	Quarterfinal	Semifinal	Final / BM	
Athlete	Event	Opposition Score	Opposition Score	Opposition Score	Opposition Score	Opposition Score	Opposition Score	Rank
João Gomes	Individual foil	Bye	Tahoun (EGY); L 14–15	Did not advance				

== Football ==
=== Men's tournament ===
Roster

The following is the Portuguese squad in the men's football tournament of the 2004 Summer Olympics.

Head coach: José Romão

No.	Pos.	Player	Date of birth (age)	Caps	Goals	2004 club
1	GK	José Moreira	20 March 1982 (aged 22)	81	0	(Portuguese Football Federation) Benfica
2	DF	Mário Sérgio	28 July 1981 (aged 23)	24	0	(Portuguese Football Federation) Sporting CP
3	MF	Raul Meireles	17 March 1983 (aged 21)	52	3	(Portuguese Football Federation) Porto
4	DF	Bruno Alves	27 November 1981 (aged 22)	30	3	(Portuguese Football Federation) Porto
5	DF	Ricardo Costa	16 May 1981 (aged 23)	87	9	(Portuguese Football Federation) Porto
6	DF	Fernando Meira*	5 June 1978 (aged 26)	83	2	(German Football Association) Stuttgart
7	FW	Cristiano Ronaldo	5 February 1985 (aged 19)	44	17	(The Football Association) Manchester United
8	MF	Hugo Viana	15 January 1983 (aged 21)	64	8	(Portuguese Football Federation) Sporting CP
9	FW	Hugo Almeida	23 May 1984 (aged 20)	0	0	(Portuguese Football Federation) Porto
10	MF	Carlos Martins	29 April 1982 (aged 22)	70	20	(Portuguese Football Federation) Sporting CP
11	MF	Jorge Ribeiro	9 November 1981 (aged 22)	55	7	(Portuguese Football Federation) Gil Vicente
12	DF	Nuno Frechaut*	24 September 1977 (aged 26)	37	1	(Portuguese Football Federation) Boavista
13	MF	Luís Boa Morte*	4 August 1977 (aged 27)	53	11	(The Football Association) Fulham
14	DF	José Bosingwa	24 August 1982 (aged 21)	57	2	(Portuguese Football Federation) Porto
15	FW	Luís Lourenço	5 June 1983 (aged 21)	71	24	(Portuguese Football Federation) Belenenses
16	DF	João Paulo	6 June 1981 (aged 23)	38	7	(Portuguese Football Federation) União de Leiria
17	FW	Danny	7 August 1983 (aged 21)	32	4	(Portuguese Football Federation) Sporting CP
18	GK	Bruno Vale	8 April 1983 (aged 21)	43	0	(Portuguese Football Federation) Porto

* Over-aged player.

Group play

Pos	Team	Pld	W	D	L	GF	GA	GD	Pts	Qualification
1	Iraq	3	2	0	1	7	4	+3	6	Qualified for the quarterfinals
2	Costa Rica	3	1	1	1	4	4	0	4	Qualified for the quarterfinals
3	Morocco	3	1	1	1	3	3	0	4	
4	Portugal	3	1	0	2	6	9	−3	3	

August 12, 2004
20:30

Iraq	4 – 2	Portugal
E. Mohammed 16'; H. Mohammed 29'; Mahmoud 56'; Sadir 90+3'	Report	Jabar 13' (o.g.); Bosingwa 45'

Pankritio Stadium, Heraklio
Attendance: 5,689
Referee: Evehe (CMR)

August 15, 2004
20:30

Morocco	1 – 2	Portugal
Bouabid 85'	Report	Ronaldo 40'; R. Costa 73'

Pankritio Stadium, Heraklio
Attendance: 7,581
Referee: Batres (GUA)

August 18, 2004
20:30

Costa Rica	4 – 2	Portugal
Villalobos 50'; Meira 68' (o.g.); Saborio 71'; Brenes 91'	Report	Almeida 29'; Ribeiro 54'

Pankritio Stadium, Heraklio
Attendance: 11,218
Referee: Torres (PAR)

== Gymnastics ==
=== Artistic ===
Men

Athlete	Event	Qualification								Final							
Athlete	Event	Apparatus						Total	Rank	Apparatus						Total	Rank
Athlete	Event	F	PH	R	V	PB	HB	Total	Rank	F	PH	R	V	PB	HB	Total	Rank
Filipe Bezugo	All-around	8.987	8.525	8.962	8.925	8.262	9.262	52.923	43	Did not advance							

=== Trampoline ===
Athlete	Event	Qualification		Final	
Athlete	Event	Score	Rank	Score	Rank
Nuno Merino	Men's	66.90	8 Q	40.10	6

== Judo ==
Four Portuguese judoka (three men and one woman) qualified for the 2004 Summer Olympics.

Men

Athlete	Event	Round of 32	Round of 16	Quarterfinals	Semifinals	Repechage 1	Repechage 2	Repechage 3	Final / BM	
Athlete	Event	Opposition Result	Opposition Result	Opposition Result	Opposition Result	Opposition Result	Opposition Result	Opposition Result	Opposition Result	Rank
João Pina	−66 kg	Nastuyev (UKR); W 1100–0010	Ungvári (HUN); W 0011–0001	Arencibia (CUB); L 0001–1001	Did not advance	Bye	Ortíz (VEN); W 0030–0001	Peñas (ESP); L 0010–0020	Did not advance	
João Neto	−73 kg	Christodoulides (CYP); W 0011–0010	Baștea (ROM); W 1020–0001	Bivol (MDA); L 0000–1000	Did not advance	Bye	Malekmohammadi (IRI); W 1110–0020	Pedro (USA); L 0000–1010	Did not advance	
Nuno Delgado	−81 kg	Meloni (ITA); L 0002–0010	Did not advance							

Women

Athlete	Event	Round of 32	Round of 16	Quarterfinals	Semifinals	Repechage 1	Repechage 2	Repechage 3	Final / BM	
Athlete	Event	Opposition Result	Opposition Result	Opposition Result	Opposition Result	Opposition Result	Opposition Result	Opposition Result	Opposition Result	Rank
Telma Monteiro	−52 kg	Soumah (GUI); W 1000–0000	Feinblat (ISR); W 1010–0000	Euranie (FRA); L 0000–0001	Did not advance	Bye	Aluaș (ROM); L 0000–1000	Did not advance		

== Sailing ==
Portuguese sailors have qualified one boat for each of the following events.

Men

Athlete	Event	Race											Net points	Final rank
Athlete	Event	1	2	3	4	5	6	7	8	9	10	M*	Net points	Final rank
João Rodrigues	Mistral	10	2	22	9	3	5	4	~~OCS~~	7	8	8	78	6
Álvaro Marinho; Miguel Nunes	470	~~22~~	5	20	21	10	8	9	1	20	1	8	103	7

Women

Athlete	Event	Race											Net points	Final rank
Athlete	Event	1	2	3	4	5	6	7	8	9	10	M*	Net points	Final rank
Joana Pratas	Europe	2	24	17	22	24	16	12	~~OCS~~	22	9	21	169	22

Open

Athlete	Event	Race											Net points	Final rank
Athlete	Event	1	2	3	4	5	6	7	8	9	10	M*	Net points	Final rank
Gustavo Lima	Laser	1	15	7	~~28~~	14	19	6	4	2	1	19	88	5
Nuno Barreto; Diogo Cayolla	Tornado	~~DNC~~	16	14	16	12	13	12	15	11	6	7	122	16

M = Medal race; OCS = On course side of the starting line; DSQ = Disqualified; DNF = Did not finish; DNS= Did not start; RDG = Redress given

== Shooting ==
Two Portuguese shooters qualified to compete in the following events:

Men

Athlete	Event	Qualification		Final	
Athlete	Event	Points	Rank	Points	Rank
João Costa	10 m air pistol	578	=17	Did not advance	
João Costa	50 m pistol	556	=12	Did not advance	
Custódio Ezequiel	Trap	115	=21	Did not advance	

== Swimming ==
Portuguese swimmers earned qualifying standards in the following events (up to a maximum of 2 swimmers in each event at the A-standard time, and 1 at the B-standard time):

Men

Athlete	Event	Heat		Semifinal		Final	
Athlete	Event	Time	Rank	Time	Rank	Time	Rank
Fernando Costa	1500 m freestyle	15:32.55	21	—N/a		Did not advance	
José Couto	100 m breaststroke	1:03.72	33	Did not advance			
Luís Monteiro	200 m freestyle	1:51.78	29	Did not advance			
Simão Morgado	100 m butterfly	53.53	24	Did not advance			
Pedro Silva	50 m freestyle	23.23	=36	Did not advance			
Tiago Venâncio	100 m freestyle	50.18	26	Did not advance			
João Araújo; Luís Monteiro; Adriano Niz; Miguel Pires	4 × 200 m freestyle relay	7:27.99 NR	14	—N/a		Did not advance	

Women

Athlete	Event	Heat		Semifinal		Final	
Athlete	Event	Time	Rank	Time	Rank	Time	Rank
Raquel Felgueiras	200 m butterfly	2:13.08	20	Did not advance			
Diana Gomes	100 m breaststroke	1:11.40	=24	Did not advance			
Diana Gomes	200 m breaststroke	2:34.23	23	Did not advance			

== Triathlon ==
Portugal sent a single triathlete to Athens.

Athlete	Event	Swim (1.5 km)	Trans 1	Bike (40 km)	Trans 2	Run (10 km)	Total Time	Rank
Vanessa Fernandes	Women's	19:20	0:21	1:11:07	0:23	35:48	2:06:15.39	8

== Volleyball ==
=== Beach ===
Athlete	Event	Preliminary round	Standing	Round of 16	Quarterfinals	Semifinals	Final	
Athlete	Event	Opposition Score	Standing	Opposition Score	Opposition Score	Opposition Score	Opposition Score	Rank
João Brenha; Miguel Maia	Men's	Pool F Baracetti – Conde (ARG); L 1 – 2 (13–21, 21–16, 15–5); Beligratis – Michalopoulos (GRE); W 2 – 0 (21–14, 21–19); Pocock – Rorich (RSA); L 0 – 2 (20–22, 20–22)	3 Q	Heuscher – Kobel (SUI); L 0 – 2 (18–21, 19–21)	Did not advance			

== Wrestling ==
Key:

- VT – Victory by Fall.
- PP – Decision by Points – the loser with technical points.
- PO – Decision by Points – the loser without technical points.

Men's Greco-Roman

Athlete	Event	Elimination Pool			Quarterfinal	Semifinal	Final / BM	
Athlete	Event	Opposition Result	Opposition Result	Rank	Opposition Result	Opposition Result	Opposition Result	Rank
Hugo Passos	−60 kg	Diaconu (ROM); L 0–4 ^{ST}	Gruenwald (USA); L 0–5 ^{VT}	3	Did not advance			21

== See also ==
- Portugal at the 2004 Summer Paralympics
