= Austria at the 2004 Summer Olympics =

- IOC code: AUT
- NOC: Austrian Olympic Committee
- Website: www.olympia.at (in German)

in Athens
- Competitors: 74 in 18 sports
- Flag bearer: Roman Hagara
- Medals Ranked 27th: Gold 2 Silver 4 Bronze 1 Total 7

Summer Olympics appearances (overview)
- 1896; 1900; ~~1904~~; 1908; 1912; 1920; 1924; 1928; 1932; 1936; 1948; 1952; 1956; 1960; 1964; 1968; 1972; 1976; 1980; 1984; 1988; 1992; 1996; 2000; 2004; 2008; 2012; 2016; 2020; 2024; 2028

Other related appearances
- 1906 Intercalated Games

Austria competed at the 2004 Summer Olympics in Athens, Greece from 13 to 29 August 2004. 74 competitors, 54 men and 20 women, took part in 56 events in 18 sports.

== Medalists ==
| Medal | Name | Sport | Event | Date |
|---|---|---|---|---|
| Gold | Roman Hagara; Hans-Peter Steinacher | Sailing | Tornado class | August 28 |
| Gold | Kate Allen | Triathlon | Women's tournament | August 25 |
| Silver | Claudia Heill | Judo | Women's 63 kg | August 17 |
| Silver | Markus Rogan | Swimming | Men's 100 m backstroke | August 16 |
| Silver | Markus Rogan | Swimming | Men's 200 m backstroke | August 19 |
| Silver | Andreas Geritzer | Sailing | Laser class | August 22 |
| Bronze | Christian Planer | Shooting | Men's 50 m rifle 3 positions | August 22 |

== Athletics ==
Austrian athletes have so far achieved qualifying standards in the following athletics events (up to a maximum of 3 athletes in each event at the 'A' Standard, and 1 at the 'B' Standard).

Key

- Note–Ranks given for track events are within the athlete's heat only
- Q = Qualified for the next round
- q = Qualified for the next round as a fastest loser or, in field events, by position without achieving the qualifying target
- NR = National record
- N/A = Round not applicable for the event
- Bye = Athlete not required to compete in round

Men
Track & road events

| Athlete | Event | Heat | | Final | |
| Athlete | Event | Result | Rank | Result | Rank |
|---|---|---|---|---|---|
| Michael Buchleitner | Marathon | —N/a | | 2:19:19 | 29 |
| Martin Pröll | 3000 m steeplechase | 8:26.01 | 8 | Did not advance | |
| Günther Weidlinger | 5000 m | 13:29.32 | 11 | Did not advance | |

Combined events – Decathlon

| Athlete | Event | 100 m | LJ | SP | HJ | 400 m | 110H | DT | PV | JT | 1500 m | Final | Rank |
|---|---|---|---|---|---|---|---|---|---|---|---|---|---|
| Roland Schwarzl | Result | 10.98 | 7.49 | 14.01 | 1.94 | 49.76 | 14.25 | 42.43 | 5.10 | 56.32 | 4:33.56 | 8102 | 10 |
| Roland Schwarzl | Points | 865 | 932 | 729 | 749 | 826 | 942 | 714 | 941 | 683 | 721 | 8102 | 10 |

Women
Track & road events

| Athlete | Event | Heat | | Quarterfinal | | Semifinal | | Final | |
| Athlete | Event | Result | Rank | Result | Rank | Result | Rank | Result | Rank |
|---|---|---|---|---|---|---|---|---|---|
| Karin Mayr-Krifka | 100 m | 11.40 | 4 q | 11.55 | 8 | Did not advance | | | |
| Karin Mayr-Krifka | 200 m | 22.81 | 5 q | 23.19 | 7 | Did not advance | | | |
| Bettina Müller | 100 m | 11.39 | 4 q | 11.50 | 7 | Did not advance | | | |

== Canoeing ==
Austria entered one competitor in each of the men's and women's divisions of the individual kayak slalom event. Both qualified for the semifinals, but in that race neither was among the top ten that advanced to the final.

=== Slalom ===
| Athlete | Event | Preliminary | | | | | | Semifinal | | Final | |
| Athlete | Event | Run 1 | Rank | Run 2 | Rank | Total | Rank | Total | Rank | Total | Rank |
|---|---|---|---|---|---|---|---|---|---|---|---|
| Helmut Oblinger | Men's K-1 | 94.25 | 3 | 98.94 | 16 | 193.19 | 7 Q | 98.02 | 13 | Did not advance | |
| Violetta Oblinger-Peters | Women's K-1 | 110.95 | 6 | 115.45 | 14 | 226.40 | 7 Q | 117.09 | 12 | Did not advance | |

== Cycling ==
=== Road ===
| Athlete | Event | Time | Rank |
|---|---|---|---|
| Bernhard Eisel | Men's road race | Did not finish | |
| Gerrit Glomser | Men's road race | 5:45:21 | 51 |
| Georg Totschnig | Men's road race | 5:41:56 | 22 |
| Gerhard Trampusch | Men's road race | 5:41:56 | 30 |
| Christiane Soeder | Women's road race | 3:25:42 | 24 |

=== Track ===
Omnium

| Athlete | Event | Points | Laps | Rank |
|---|---|---|---|---|
| Franz Stocher | Men's point race | 9 | 0 | 17 |
| Roland Garber; Franz Stocher | Men's madison | 8 | –1 | 8 |

=== Mountain biking ===
| Athlete | Event | Time | Rank |
|---|---|---|---|
| Christoph Soukup | Men's cross-country | 2:22:50 | 15 |
| Michael Weiss | Men's cross-country | 2:30:14 | 32 |
| Bärbel Jungmeier | Women's cross-country | 2:09:22 | 14 |

== Diving ==
Women

| Athlete | Event | Preliminaries | | Semifinals | | Final | |
| Athlete | Event | Points | Rank | Points | Rank | Points | Rank |
|---|---|---|---|---|---|---|---|
| Marion Reiff | 10 m platform | 232.35 | 31 | Did not advance | | | |
| Anja Richter | 10 m platform | 302.16 | 17 Q | 472.44 | 15 | Did not advance | |

== Equestrian ==
=== Dressage ===
| Athlete | Horse | Event | Grand Prix | | Grand Prix Special | | Grand Prix Freestyle | | Overall | |
| Athlete | Horse | Event | Score | Rank | Score | Rank | Score | Rank | Score | Rank |
|---|---|---|---|---|---|---|---|---|---|---|
| Friedrich Gaulhofer | Wels | Individual | 63.667 | 44 | Did not advance | | | | | |
| Peter Gmoser | Don Debussy | Individual | 62.750 | 48 | Did not advance | | | | | |
| Victoria Max-Theurer | Falcao | Individual | 68.667 | 20 Q | 68.753 | 20 | Did not advance | | | |
| Nina Stadlinger | Egalité | Individual | 67.375 | 26 Q | 66.148 | 25 | Did not advance | | | |
| Friedrich Gaulhofer; Peter Gmoser; Victoria Max-Theurer; Nina Stadlinger | See above | Team | —N/a | | | | | | 66.570 | 8 |

=== Eventing ===
| Athlete | Horse | Event | Dressage | | Cross-country | | | Jumping | | | | | | Total | |
| Athlete | Horse | Event | Dressage | | Cross-country | | | Qualifier | | | Final | | | Total | |
| Athlete | Horse | Event | Penalties | Rank | Penalties | Total | Rank | Penalties | Total | Rank | Penalties | Total | Rank | Penalties | Rank |
|---|---|---|---|---|---|---|---|---|---|---|---|---|---|---|---|
| Harald Ambros | Miss Ferrari | Individual | 54.00 | 33 | 7.20 | 61.20 | 27 | 8.00 | 69.20 | 27 Q | 4.00 | 73.20 | 19 | 73.20 | 19 |
| Margit Appelt | Ice On Fire | Individual | 74.60 # | =71 | 162.20 | 236.80 | 71 | 35.00 | 271.80 | 68 | Did not advance | | | 271.80 | 68 |
| Harald Riedl | Foxy XX | Individual | 61.60 # | 49 | 52.80 | 114.40 | 61 | 27.00 | 141.40 | 58 | Did not advance | | | ~~141.40~~ | DSQ |
| Harald Siegl | Gigant 2 | Individual | 60.60 | 46 | 23.20 | 83.80 | 48 | 12.00 | 95.80 | 45 | Did not advance | | | 95.80 | 45 |
| Andreas Zehrer | Raemmi Daemmi | Individual | 60.40 | =44 | Eliminated | | | Did not advance | | | | | | | |
| Harald Ambros; Margit Appelt; Harald Riedl; Harald Siegl; Andreas Zehrer | See above | Team | 175.00 | 10 | 192.60 | 381.80 | 14 | 55.00 | 436.80 | 14 | —N/a | | | 436.80 | 14 |

"#" indicates that the score of this rider does not count in the team competition, since only the best three results of a team are counted.

== Fencing ==
Men

| Athlete | Event | Round of 64 | Round of 32 | Round of 16 | Quarterfinals | Semifinals | Final | |
| Athlete | Event | Opposition Result | Opposition Result | Opposition Result | Opposition Result | Opposition Result | Opposition Result | Rank |
|---|---|---|---|---|---|---|---|---|
| Christoph Marik | Individual épée | Bye | Karyuchenko (UKR); L 7–15 | Did not advance | | | | |
| Roland Schlosser | Individual foil | Bye | Attely (FRA); L 14–15 | Did not advance | | | | |

== Judo ==
| Athlete | Event | Round of 32 | Round of 16 | Quarterfinals | Semifinals | Repechage 1 | Repechage 2 | Repechage 3 | Final / BM | |
| Athlete | Event | Opposition Result | Opposition Result | Opposition Result | Opposition Result | Opposition Result | Opposition Result | Opposition Result | Opposition Result | Rank |
|---|---|---|---|---|---|---|---|---|---|---|
| Ludwig Paischer | Men's −60 kg | Choi M-H (KOR); L 0001–1100 | Did not advance | | | | | | | |
| Claudia Heill | Women's −63 kg | Rousey (USA); W 0010–0000 | Clark (GBR); W 1001–0001 | Hong O-S (PRK); W 0100–0010 | Žolnir (SLO); W 1000–0111 | Bye | | | Tanimoto (JPN); L 0000–0200 | 2nd place, silver medalist(s) |

== Rowing ==
Men

| Athlete | Event | Heats | | Repechage | | Semifinals | | Final | |
| Athlete | Event | Time | Rank | Time | Rank | Time | Rank | Time | Rank |
|---|---|---|---|---|---|---|---|---|---|
| Raphael Hartl | Single sculls | 7:34.61 | 2 R | 7:06.21 | 2 SA/B/C | 6:58.67 | 5 FC | 7:00.75 | 17 |
| Juliusz Madecki; Sebastian Sageder; Wolfgang Sigl; Bernd Wakolbinger | Lightweight four | 5:54.07 | 3 SA/B | Bye | | 5:58.73 | 4 FB | 6:22.85 | 10 |

Qualification Legend: FA=Final A (medal); FB=Final B (non-medal); FC=Final C (non-medal); FD=Final D (non-medal); FE=Final E (non-medal); FF=Final F (non-medal); SA/B=Semifinals A/B; SC/D=Semifinals C/D; SE/F=Semifinals E/F; R=Repechage

== Sailing ==
Men

| Athlete | Event | Race | | | | | | | | | | | Net points | Final rank |
| Athlete | Event | 1 | 2 | 3 | 4 | 5 | 6 | 7 | 8 | 9 | 10 | M* | Net points | Final rank |
|---|---|---|---|---|---|---|---|---|---|---|---|---|---|---|
| Andreas Hanakamp; Hans Spitzauer | Star | 12 | 14 | 7 | ~~16~~ | 14 | 16 | 9 | 3 | 5 | 11 | 6 | 97 | 13 |

Open

| Athlete | Event | Race | | | | | | | | | | | | | | | | Net points | Final rank |
| Athlete | Event | 1 | 2 | 3 | 4 | 5 | 6 | 7 | 8 | 9 | 10 | 11 | 12 | 13 | 14 | 15 | M* | Net points | Final rank |
|---|---|---|---|---|---|---|---|---|---|---|---|---|---|---|---|---|---|---|---|
| Andreas Geritzer | Laser | 4 | 1 | ~~34~~ | 7 | 1 | 2 | 12 | 15 | 12 | 4 | —N/a | | | | | 10 | 68 | 2nd place, silver medalist(s) |
| Nico Delle-Karth; Nikolaus Resch | 49er | 5 | 13 | 11 | 6 | 5 | 14 | 6 | ~~17~~ | 13 | 4 | 15 | 8 | 13 | 4 | 12 | 8 | 122 | 10 |
| Roman Hagara; Hans-Peter Steinacher | Tornado | 1 | 3 | 8 | 1 | ~~14~~ | 8 | 4 | 1 | 2 | 5 | —N/a | | | | | 1 | 34 | 1st place, gold medalist(s) |

M = Medal race; OCS = On course side of the starting line; DSQ = Disqualified; DNF = Did not finish; DNS= Did not start; RDG = Redress given

== Shooting ==
Men

| Athlete | Event | Qualification | | Final | |
| Athlete | Event | Points | Rank | Points | Rank |
|---|---|---|---|---|---|
| Thomas Farnik | 10 m air rifle | 593 | =12 | Did not advance | |
| Thomas Farnik | 50 m rifle 3 positions | 1165 | 6 Q | 1261.4 | 6 |
| Mario Knögler | 50 m rifle prone | 592 | =16 | Did not advance | |
| Christian Planer | 10 m air rifle | 593 | =12 | Did not advance | |
| Christian Planer | 50 m rifle 3 positions | 1167 | 3 Q | 1262.8 | 3rd place, bronze medalist(s) |
| Wolfram Waibel Jr. | 50 m rifle prone | 592 | =16 | Did not advance | |

Women

| Athlete | Event | Qualification | | Final | |
| Athlete | Event | Points | Rank | Points | Rank |
|---|---|---|---|---|---|
| Monika Haselsberger | 10 m air rifle | 396 | =9* | Did not advance | |

* Lost in shoot-out

== Swimming ==
Austrian swimmers earned qualifying standards in the following events (up to a maximum of 2 swimmers in each event at the A-standard time, and 1 at the B-standard time):

Men

| Athlete | Event | Heat | | Semifinal | | Final | |
| Athlete | Event | Time | Rank | Time | Rank | Time | Rank |
|---|---|---|---|---|---|---|---|
| Dominik Koll | 200 m freestyle | 1:51.36 | 26 | Did not advance | | | |
| Maxim Podoprigora | 100 m breaststroke | 1:03.08 | 25 | Did not advance | | | |
| Maxim Podoprigora | 200 m breaststroke | 2:14.31 | 13 Q | 2:14.66 | 13 | Did not advance | |
| Markus Rogan | 100 m backstroke | 54.87 | =4 Q | 54.42 | 2 Q | 54.35 NR | 2nd place, silver medalist(s) |
| Markus Rogan | 200 m backstroke | 1:58.06 | 3 Q | 1:57.50 | 3 Q | 1:57.35 NR | 2nd place, silver medalist(s) |

Women

| Athlete | Event | Heat | | Semifinal | | Final | |
| Athlete | Event | Time | Rank | Time | Rank | Time | Rank |
|---|---|---|---|---|---|---|---|
| Judith Draxler | 50 m freestyle | 25.82 | 19 | Did not advance | | | |
| Judith Draxler | 100 m freestyle | 57.29 | 33 | Did not advance | | | |
| Mirna Jukić | 100 m breaststroke | 1:09.99 | 14 Q | 1:10.06 | 14 | Did not advance | |
| Mirna Jukić | 200 m breaststroke | 2:28.28 | 9 Q | 2:26.95 | 8 Q | 2:26.36 | 7 |
| Petra Zahrl | 200 m butterfly | 2:13.92 | 23 | Did not advance | | | |

== Table tennis ==
Men

| Athlete | Event | Round 1 | Round 2 | Round 3 | Round 4 | Quarterfinals | Semifinals | Final / BM | |
| Athlete | Event | Opposition Result | Opposition Result | Opposition Result | Opposition Result | Opposition Result | Opposition Result | Opposition Result | Rank |
|---|---|---|---|---|---|---|---|---|---|
| Chen Weixing | Men's singles | Bye | Henzell (AUS); W 4–0 | Oh S-E (KOR); L 3–4 | Did not advance | | | | |
| Werner Schlager | Men's singles | Bye | | Li C (HKG); W 4–2 | Boll (GER); L 3–4 | Did not advance | | | |
| Karl Jindrak; Werner Schlager | Men's doubles | —N/a | Bye | | Maze / Tugwell (DEN); L 0–4 | Did not advance | | | |
| Liu Jia | Women's singles | Bye | | Fujinuma (JPN); L 3–4 | Did not advance | | | | |

== Taekwondo ==
| Athlete | Event | Round of 16 | Quarterfinals | Semifinals | Repechage 1 | Repechage 2 | Final / BM | |
| Athlete | Event | Opposition Result | Opposition Result | Opposition Result | Opposition Result | Opposition Result | Opposition Result | Rank |
|---|---|---|---|---|---|---|---|---|
| Tuncay Çalışkan | Men's −68 kg | Liango (CAF); W KO | Huang C-H (TPE); L 8–10 | Did not advance | Hussein (EGY); L 4–8 | Did not advance | | 7 |
| Nevena Lukic | Women's −49 kg | Mochesane (LES); W 4–0 | Carías (GUA); L 1–1 SUP | Did not advance | | | | |

== Tennis ==
| Athlete | Event | Round of 64 | Round of 32 | Round of 16 | Quarterfinals | Semifinals | Final / BM | |
| Athlete | Event | Opposition Score | Opposition Score | Opposition Score | Opposition Score | Opposition Score | Opposition Score | Rank |
|---|---|---|---|---|---|---|---|---|
| Jürgen Melzer | Men's singles | Spadea (USA); L 0–6, 1–6 | Did not advance | | | | | |

== Triathlon ==
| Athlete | Event | Swim (1.5 km) | Trans 1 | Bike (40 km) | Trans 2 | Run (10 km) | Total Time | Rank |
|---|---|---|---|---|---|---|---|---|
| Norbert Domnik | Men's | 19:34 | 0:17 | 1:04:19 | 0:23 | 35:20 | 1:59:13.25 | 37 |
| Kate Allen | Women's | 20:38 | 0:19 | 1:09:52 | 0:25 | 34:13 | 2:04:43.45 | 1st place, gold medalist(s) |
| Eva Bramböck | Women's | 20:32 | 0:21 | 1:09:55 | 0:25 | 39:52 | 2:10:19.60 | 28 |

== Volleyball ==
=== Beach ===
| Athlete | Event | Preliminary round | Standing | Round of 16 | Quarterfinals | Semifinals | Final | |
| Athlete | Event | Opposition Score | Standing | Opposition Score | Opposition Score | Opposition Score | Opposition Score | Rank |
|---|---|---|---|---|---|---|---|---|
| Nikolas Berger; Florian Gosch | Men's | Pool C Bosma – Herrera (ESP); L 0 – 2 (14–21, 13–21); Gartmayer – Nowotny (AUT); W 2 – 0 (21–17, 21–17); M Laciga – P Laciga (SUI); L 0 – 2 (17–21, 19–21) | 3 | Did not advance | | | | |
| Peter Gartmayer; Robert Nowotny | Men's | Pool C M Laciga – P Laciga (SUI); L 0 – 2 (14–21, 14–21); Berger – Gosch (AUT); L 0 – 2 (17–21, 17–21); Bosma – Herrera (ESP); L 1 – 2 (16–21, 21–19, 11–15) | 4 | Did not advance | | | | |

== Weightlifting ==
| Athlete | Event | Snatch | | Clean & Jerk | | Total | Rank |
| Athlete | Event | Result | Rank | Result | Rank | Total | Rank |
|---|---|---|---|---|---|---|---|
| Matthias Steiner | Men's −105 kg | 182.5 | =11 | 222.5 | =5 | 405.0 | 7 |

== Wrestling ==
Key:

- VT - Victory by Fall.
- PP - Decision by Points - the loser with technical points.
- PO - Decision by Points - the loser without technical points.

Men's freestyle

| Athlete | Event | Elimination Pool | | | | Quarterfinal | Semifinal | Final / BM | |
| Athlete | Event | Opposition Result | Opposition Result | Opposition Result | Rank | Opposition Result | Opposition Result | Opposition Result | Rank |
|---|---|---|---|---|---|---|---|---|---|
| Lubos Cikel | −60 kg | Jung Y-H (KOR); L 1–3 ^{PP} | Zakhartdinov (UZB); W 3–1 ^{PP} | Inoue (JPN); L 0–3 ^{PO} | 3 | Did not advance | | | 8 |
| Radovan Valach | −96 kg | Cormier (USA); L 0–3 ^{PO} | Bartnicki (POL); L 1–3 ^{PP} | —N/a | 3 | Did not advance | | | 19 |

Women's freestyle

| Athlete | Event | Elimination Pool | | | Classification | Semifinal | Final / BM | |
| Athlete | Event | Opposition Result | Opposition Result | Rank | Opposition Result | Opposition Result | Opposition Result | Rank |
|---|---|---|---|---|---|---|---|---|
| Marina Gastl | −72 kg | Manyurova (RUS); L 1–3 ^{PP} | Schätzle (GER); L 1–3 ^{PP} | 3 | Did not advance | | | 9 |
