= Equestrian at the 2004 Summer Olympics – Individual eventing =

Individual eventing at the Games of the XXVIII Olympiad
- Venue: Markopoulo Olympic Equestrian Centre
- Date: 15–18 August 2004
- Competitors: 75 from 23 nations
- Winning time: -44.2

Medalists
1st place, gold medalist(s)		Leslie Law	Great Britain
2nd place, silver medalist(s)		Kimberly Severson	United States
3rd place, bronze medalist(s)		Philippa Funnell	Great Britain

The individual eventing event, part of the equestrian program at the 2004 Summer Olympics, was held from 15 to 18 August 2004 in the Olympic Equestrian Centre on the outskirts of Markopoulo in the Attica region of Greece. Like all other equestrian events, the eventing competition was mixed gender, with both male and female athletes competing in the same division.

For the first time, there were two rounds of jumping. Both rounds counted towards the individual results. After the first round, the final team placings were determined. Then the top 25 pairs ( limited to three per nation ) contested a second jumping round, the results from this were added to the riders scores to determine the final individual results.

== Bettina Hoy ==
The German Bettina Hoy was initially awarded first place. During the first jumping phase, she received 14 time penalty points in an otherwise flawless round. This put her in eighth place going into the final phase. The Germans appealed those points, noting that the time on which the points had been assigned (the time from when Hoy had first crossed the starting line) was not the same time as the time displayed on the stadium clock and which Hoy had thought was the official time. The clock had been reset and displayed the time from when Hoy had crossed the starting line the second time, which was when she began her jumps. These points were then rescinded by the Jury of Appeal, which put Hoy in second place only 2.20 points behind the then-leader. In the final jumping phase, Hoy moved into first place and was awarded the gold medal on 18 August. The Court of Arbitration for Sport ruled on 21 August that the appeal had been incorrectly upheld and ordered that the 14 points be returned to Hoy's score. This stripped her of her medal and put her in ninth place.

== Results ==
The total score for each horse and rider was the sum of the total penalty points earned in the various phases of competitions. The pair with the lowest number of penalty points was victorious.

=== Standings after dressage ===
For the dressage portion of the competition, horse and rider pairs performed series of movements that were evaluated by judges. Judges gave marks of 0 to 10 for each movement, subtracting points for errors. The score for each judge was represented by a percentage of marks possible that were gained. Scores from the three judges were averaged for an overall percentage. This was then subtracted from 100 and multiplied by 1.5 to determine the number of penalty points awarded for the round.

Rank	Rider	Horse	Nation	Judge H	Judge C	Judge B	Score	Penalty Points
1	Nicolas Touzaint	Galan de Sauvagere	France	78.8	82.4	80.0	80.40	29.4
2	Pippa Funnell	Primmore's Pride	Great Britain	81.2	77.6	78.4	79.07	31.4
3	Bettina Hoy	Ringwood Cockatoo	Germany	78.8	80.0	77.2	78.67	32.0
4	Kimberly Severson	Winsome Adante	United States	76.0	77.2	74.4	75.87	36.2
5	Jean Teulere	Espoir de la Mare	France	74.8	75.2	73.2	74.40	38.4
6	William Fox-Pitt	Tamarillo	Great Britain	72.4	75.2	75.2	74.27	38.6
7	Rebel Morrow	Oaklea Groover	Australia	72.0	71.6	75.2	72.93	40.6
8	Ingrid Klimke	Sleep Late	Germany	69.6	76.0	72.4	72.67	41.0
9	Frank Ostholt	Air Jordan	Germany	68.4	77.2	71.6	72.40	41.4
10	Leslie Law	Shear l'Eau	Great Britain	71.6	71.2	70.8	71.20	43.2
11	Linda Algotsson	Stand By Me	Sweden	70.0	73.6	69.2	70.93	43.6
11	Andrew Hoy	Mr Pracatan	Australia	70.4	73.6	68.8	70.93	43.6
13	Heelan Tompkins	Glengarrick	New Zealand	71.2	71.6	69.2	70.67	44.0
14	Hinrich Romeike	Marius	Germany	70.8	72.4	68.0	70.40	44.4
15	Darren Chiacchia	Windfall 2	United States	69.6	74.0	67.2	70.27	44.6
16	Olivia Bunn	Top of the Line	Australia	68.4	71.2	70.0	69.87	45.2
16	Heidi Antikatzides	Michaelmas	Greece	66.8	73.2	69.6	69.87	45.2
18	Andreas Dibowski	Little Lemon	Germany	66.0	70.8	72.4	69.73	45.4
19	Didier Courrèges	Debat d'Estruval	France	66.0	72.4	70.4	69.60	45.6
20	Arnaud Boiteau	Expo du Moulin	France	68.4	72.4	67.6	69.47	45.8
21	Phillip Dutton	Nova Top	Australia	68.4	69.2	68.8	68.80	46.8
22	Matthew Grayling	Revo	New Zealand	64.8	70.0	70.8	68.53	47.2
23	John Williams	Carrick	United States	66.4	70.0	68.4	68.27	47.6
24	Constantin van Rijckevorsel	Withcote Nellie	Belgium	66.4	73.2	64.4	68.00	48.0
24	Mary King	King Solomon III	Great Britain	69.2	68.8	66.0	68.00	48.0
26	Marisa Cortesi	Peppermint III	Switzerland	66.4	67.2	69.6	67.73	48.4
27	Stuart Tinney	Jeepster	Australia	68.4	67.6	66.4	67.47	48.8
28	Jeanette Brakewell	Over to You	Great Britain	67.6	68.4	64.4	66.80	49.8
29	Amy Tryon	Poggio II	United States	65.2	70.8	62.8	66.27	50.6
30	Kamil Rajnert	Marnego	Poland	62.0	69.6	66.8	66.13	50.8
31	Sasha Harrison	All Love du Fenaud	Ireland	64.8	62.8	66.8	64.80	52.8
32	Harald Ambros	Miss Ferrari	Austria	63.6	68.0	60.4	64.00	54.0
33	Cedric Lyard	Fine Mervielle	France	61.2	65.6	64.4	63.73	54.4
34	Joris Vanspringel	Over and Over	Belgium	62.0	66.8	59.2	62.67	56.0
35	Karin Donckers	Gormley	Belgium	59.2	66.8	61.2	62.40	56.4
36	Sara Algotsson	Robin des Bois	Sweden	62.80	62.8	61.2	62.27	56.6
37	Dolf Desmedt	Bold Action	Belgium	59.2	64.4	62.4	62.00	57.0
38	Jaroslav Hatla	Jennallas Boy	Czech Republic	64.4	58.4	61.6	61.47	57.8
38	Eddy Stibbe	Dusky Moon	Netherlands Antilles	62.4	61.2	60.8	61.47	57.8
40	Niall Griffin	Sinead Cody	Ireland	61.6	60.8	60.8	61.07	58.4
41	Susan Shortt	Just Beauty Queen	Ireland	60.8	60.4	61.2	60.80	58.8
42	Tim Collins	Delton Magna	Bermuda	58.8	59.6	62.8	60.40	59.4
43	Andreas Zehrer	Raemmi Daemmi	Austria	58.4	59.2	61.6	59.73	60.4
43	Andrzej Pasek	Dekalog	Poland	58.4	60.4	60.4	59.73	60.4
45	Harald Siegl	Gigant 2	Austria	58.0	62.0	58.8	59.60	60.6
46	Magnus Gallerdal	Keymaster	Sweden	55.6	61.6	60.8	59.33	61.0
47	Hawley Bennett	Livingstone	Canada	57.6	60.8	59.2	59.20	61.2
48	Harald Riedl	Foxy XX	Austria	57.2	60.8	58.8	58.93	61.6
49	Susanna Bordone	Ava	Italy	58.4	58.4	57.6	58.13	62.8
50	Mark Kyle	Drunken Disorderly	Ireland	59.2	56.4	58.4	58.00	63.0
51	Michael Winter	Balista	Canada	56.8	59.2	57.6	57.87	63.2
52	Garry Roque	Waikura	Canada	57.6	54.0	61.6	57.73	63.4
52	Andrew Nicholson	Fenicio	New Zealand	58.0	57.2	58.0	57.73	63.4
54	Hendrik Degros	Mr. Noppus	Belgium	56.0	62.0	54.4	57.47	63.8
54	Blyth Tait	Ready Teddy	New Zealand	56.8	56.4	59.2	57.47	63.8
56	Fabio Magni	Vent d'Arade	Italy	55.2	58.8	57.2	57.07	64.4
57	Jennifer Eicher	Agent Mulder	Switzerland	55.6	55.2	59.2	56.67	65.0
58	Julie Richards	Jacob Two Two	United States	54.0	54.4	60.8	56.40	65.4
59	Rafael de Gouveira Junior	Mozart	Brazil	56.0	56.8	55.6	56.13	65.8
60	Bruce Mandeville	Larissa	Canada	55.2	54.4	57.6	55.73	66.4
61	Daniel Jocelyn	Silence	New Zealand	57.2	55.6	53.6	55.47	66.8
61	Stefano Brecciaroli	Cappa Hill	Italy	56.4	53.2	56.8	55.47	66.8
63	Pawel Spisak	Weriusz	Poland	54.0	57.6	54.4	55.33	67.0
64	Edmond Gibney	Kings Highway	Ireland	54.8	56.4	52.8	54.67	68.0
65	Pepo Puch	Banville d'Ivoy	Croatia	53.6	52.0	57.2	54.27	68.6
66	André Paro	Land Heir	Brazil	54.0	52.4	53.6	53.33	70.0
66	Sérgio Marins	Rally LF	Brazil	56.4	49.6	54.0	53.33	70.0
68	Ian Roberts	Mata-riki	Canada	54.0	50.4	54.4	52.93	70.6
69	Giovanni Menchi	Hunefer	Italy	51.6	50.0	53.6	51.73	72.4
70	Carlos Grave	Laughton Hills	Portugal	53.2	51.2	50.0	51.47	72.8
71	Margit Appelt	Ice on Fire	Austria	50.8	50.8	49.2	50.27	74.6
71	Pongsiree Bunluewong	Eliza Jane	Thailand	50.0	46.0	54.8	50.27	74.6
73	Raul de Senna	Super Rocky	Brazil	49.2	48.8	50.0	49.33	76.0
74	Remo Tellini	Especial Reserve	Brazil	47.2	46.8	46.8	46.93	79.6
75	Viorel Bubau	Carnaval	Romania	47.6	42.4	50.0	46.67	80.0

=== Standings after Dressage and Cross-Country ===
In the cross country phase, each pair had to traverse an obstacle course spread over a track of approximately 5.57 kilometres. The optimum time for the course was 9 minutes, 46 seconds. Pairs received .4 penalty points for every second beyond that time, up to a limit of 19 minutes and 32 seconds. Any pair that had not finished in that time was eliminated.

Penalty points were also assessed for disobedience faults at obstacles and for falls. Disobedience faults incurred 20 penalty points, rider falls incurred 65, and horse falls eliminated the pair. The total penalty points from cross country were added to those incurred in phase 1, dressage, for a two-round total.

Rank	Rider	Horse	Nation	Faults	Time	Score	Phase 1	Total
1	Nicolas Touzaint	Galan de Sauvagere	France	0	0	0	29.4	29.4
2	Bettina Hoy	Ringwood Cockatoo	Germany	0	3.6	3.6	32.0	35.6
3	Kimberly Severson	Winsome Adante	United States	0	0	0	36.2	36.2
4	Jean Teulere	Espoir de la Mare	France	0	0	0	38.4	38.4
5	William Fox-Pitt	Tamarillo	(United Kingdom) Great Britain	0	0	0	38.6	38.6
6	Ingrid Klimke	Sleep Late	Germany	0	0	0	41.0	41.0
7	Rebel Morrow	Oaklea Groover	Australia	0	1.6	1.6	40.6	42.2
8	Pippa Funnel	Primmore's Pride	(United Kingdom) Great Britain	0	11.2	11.2	31.4	42.6
9	Frank Ostholt	Air Jordan	Germany	0	1.6	1.6	41.4	43.0
10	Heelan Tompkins	Glengarrick	New Zealand	0	0	0	44.0	44.0
11	Leslie Law	Shear l'Eau	(United Kingdom) Great Britain	0	1.2	1.2	43.2	44.4
12	Darren Chiacchia	Windfall 2	United States	0	0	0	44.6	44.6
13	Hinrich Romeike	Marius	Germany	0	0.8	0.8	44.4	45.2
14	Didier Courrèges	Debat d'Estruval	France	0	0	0	45.6	45.6
15	Olivia Bunn	Top of the Line	Australia	0	1.2	1.2	45.2	46.4
16	Phillip Dutton	Nova Top	Australia	0	0	0	46.8	46.8
17	Matthew Grayling	Revo	New Zealand	0	0	0	47.2	47.2
18	Mary King	King Solomon III	(United Kingdom) Great Britain	0	0	0	48.0	48.0
19	Stuart Tinney	Jeepster	Australia	0	0	0	48.8	48.8
19	John Williams	Carrick	United States	0	1.2	1.2	47.6	48.8
21	Andreas Dibowski	Little Lemon	Germany	0	3.6	3.6	45.4	49.0
22	Amy Tryon	Poggio II	United States	0	1.2	1.2	50.6	51.8
23	Jeanette Brakewell	Over to You	(United Kingdom) Great Britain	0	4.0	4.0	49.8	53.8
24	Constantin van Rijckevorsel	Withcote Nellie	Belgium	0	6.4	6.4	48.0	54.4
25	Karin Donckers	Gormley	Belgium	0	0	0	56.4	56.4
26	Cedric Lyard	Fine Mervielle	France	0	3.2	3.2	54.4	57.6
27	Harald Ambros	Miss Ferrari	Austria	0	7.2	7.2	54.0	61.2
28	Jaroslav Hatla	Jennallas Boy	Czech Republic	0	5.2	5.2	57.8	63.0
28	Mark Kyle	Drunken Disorderly	(Republic of Ireland) Ireland	0	0	0	63.0	63.0
30	Niall Griffin	Lorgaine	(Republic of Ireland) Ireland	0	4.8	4.8	58.4	63.2
31	Magnus Gallerdal	Keymaster	Sweden	0	2.8	2.8	61.0	63.8
32	Susan Shortt	Just Beauty Queen	(Republic of Ireland) Ireland	0	6.0	6.0	58.8	64.8
33	Blyth Tait	Ready Teddy	New Zealand	0	1.2	1.2	63.8	65.0
33	Jennifer Eicher	Agent Mulder	Switzerland	0	0.0	0.0	65.0	65.0
35	Daniel Jocelyn	Silence	New Zealand	0	0.0	0.0	66.8	66.8
36	Julie Richards	Jacob Two Two	United States	0	1.6	1.6	65.4	67.0
37	Sara Algotson	Robin des Bois	Sweden	0	11.2	11.2	56.6	67.8
38	Tim Collins	Delton Magna	Bermuda	0	9.2	9.2	59.4	68.6
39	Rafael Gouveia Jr.	Mozart	Brazil	0	4.8	4.8	65.8	70.6
40	Kamil Rajnert	Marnego	Poland	0	24.4	24.4	50.8	75.2
41	Giovanni Menchi	Hunefer	Italy	0	4.0	4.0	72.4	76.4
42	Bruce Mandeville	Larissa	Canada	0	10.8	10.8	66.4	77.2
43	Pongsiree Bunluewong	Eliza Jane	Thailand	0	4.4	4.4	74.6	79.0
44	Stefano Brecciaroli	Cappa Hill	Italy	0	13.2	13.2	66.8	80.0
44	Michael Winter	Balista	Canada	0	16.8	16.8	63.2	80.0
46	Hendrik Degros	Mr. Noppus	Belgium	0	18.4	18.4	63.8	82.2
47	Linda Algotsson	Stand By Me	Sweden	20.0	18.8	38.8	43.6	82.4
48	Harald Siegl	Gigant 2	Austria	0	23.2	23.2	60.6	83.8
49	Carlos Grave	Laughton Hills	Portugal	0	12.8	12.8	72.8	85.6
50	Sergio Marins	Rally LF	Brazil	0	16.0	16.0	70.0	86.0
51	Andre Paro	Land Heir	Brazil	0	16.8	16.8	70.0	86.8
51	Andrzej Pasek	Dekalog	Poland	0	26.4	26.4	60.4	86.8
53	Dolf Desmedt	Bold Action	Belgium	20.0	11.2	31.2	57.0	88.2
54	Fabio Magni	Vent d'Arade	Italy	0	24.4	24.4	64.4	88.8
55	Raul Senna	Super Rocky	Brazil	0	14.4	14.4	76.0	90.4
56	Sasha Harrison	All Love du Fenaud	(Republic of Ireland) Ireland	20.0	21.6	41.6	52.8	94.4
57	Remo Tellini	Especial Reserve	Brazil	0	17.6	17.6	79.6	97.2
58	Eddy Stibbe	Dusky Moon	Netherlands Antilles	20.0	29.2	49.2	57.8	107.0
59	Garry Roque	Waikura	Canada	0	45.6	45.6	63.4	109.0
60	Susanna Bordone	Ava	Italy	20.0	27.2	47.2	62.8	110.0
61	Harald Riedl	Foxy XX	Austria	20.0	32.8	52.8	61.6	114.4
62	Andrew Hoy	Mr Pracatan	Australia	65.0	10.8	75.8	43.6	119.4
63	Heidi Antikatzides	Michaelmas	Greece	65.0	21.6	86.6	45.2	131.8
64	Andrew Nicholson	Fenicio	New Zealand	65.0	7.2	72.2	63.4	135.6
65	Edmond Gibney	Kings Highway	(Republic of Ireland) Ireland	65.0	15.6	80.6	68	148.6
66	Pepo Puch	Banville d'Ivoy	Croatia	65.0	15.6	80.6	68.6	149.2
67	Hawley Bennett	Livingstone	Canada	40.0	54.8	94.8	61.2	156.0
68	Marisa Cortesi	Peppermint III	Switzerland	85.0	26.0	111.0	48.4	159.4
69	Pawel Spisak	Weriusz	Poland	65.0	34.4	99.4	67.0	166.4
70	Ian Roberts	Mata-riki	Canada	85.0	52.0	137.0	70.6	207.6
71	Margit Appelt	Ice on Fire	Austria	65.0	97.2	162.2	74.6	236.8
DNF	Arnaud Boiteau	Expo du Moulin	France	-	-	-	45.8	-
DNF	Joris Vanspringel	Over and Over	Belgium	-	-	-	56.0	-
DNF	Andreas Zehrer	Raemmi Daemmi	Austria	-	-	-	60.4	-
DNF	Viorel Bubau	Carnaval	Romania	-	-	-	80.0	-

=== Standings after Show jumping round one ===
In show jumping, pairs received 4 penalty points for each obstacle knocked down, 4 penalty points for the horse's first disobedience, and 8 penalty points for the rider's first fall. They also received 1 penalty point for each second over the optimum time.

They could be eliminated for a second disobedience, the rider's second fall, the horse's first fall, or taking more than twice the optimum time to finish the course. No pairs were eliminated in any of these fashions, though one team did not start and two more withdrew.

Rank	Rider	Horse	Nation	Faults	Time	Score	Phases 1+2	Total
1	Nicolas Touzaint	Galan de Sauvagere	France	4	0	4	29.4	33.4
2	Kimberly Severson	Winsome Adante	United States	4	1	5	36.2	41.2
3	Philippa Funnel	Primmore's Pride	(United Kingdom) Great Britain	0	0	0	42.6	42.6
4	Leslie Law	Shear l'Eau	(United Kingdom) Great Britain	0	0	0	44.4	44.4
5	Hinrich Romeike	Marius	Germany	0	0	0	45.2	45.2
6	Jean Teulere	Espoir de la Mare	France	4	4	8	38.4	46.4
7	Heelan Tompkins	Glengarrick	New Zealand	4	0	4	44.0	48.0
8	Bettina Hoy	Ringwood Cockatoo	Germany	0	14	14	35.6	49.6
9	Rebel Morrow	Oaklea Groover	Australia	4	4	8	42.2	50.2
10	Phillip Dutton	Nova Top	Australia	4	0	4	46.8	50.8
11	Amy Tryon	Poggio II	United States	0	0	0	51.8	51.8
12	Darren Chiacchia	Windfall 2	United States	8	0	8	44.6	52.6
13	Andreas Dibowski	Little Lemon	Germany	4	0	4	49	53.0
14	Frank Ostholt	Air Jordan	Germany	8	3	11	43.0	54.0
15	Constantin van Rijckevorsel	Withcote Nellie	Belgium	0	0	0	54.4	54.4
16	Mary King	King Solomon III	(United Kingdom) Great Britain	8	0	0	48.0	56.0
17	Karin Donckers	Gormley	Belgium	0	0	0	56.4	56.4
18	Jeanette Brakewell	Over to You	(United Kingdom) Great Britain	4	0	4	53.8	57.8
19	Matthew Grayling	Revo	New Zealand	12	0	12	47.2	59.2
20	Didier Courrèges	Debat d'Estruval	France	12	3	15	45.6	60.6
21	John Williams	Carrick	United States	12	0	12	48.8	60.8
22	Magnus Gallerdal	Keymaster	Sweden	0	0	0	63.8	63.8
23	Jaroslav Hatla	Jennallas Boy	Czech Republic	4	0	4	63.0	67.0
23	Julie Richards	Jacob Two Two	United States	0	0	0	67.0	67.0
23	Mark Kyle	Drunken Disorderly	(Republic of Ireland) Ireland	4	0	0	63.0	67.0
26	Blyth Tait	Ready Teddy	New Zealand	4	0	4	65.0	69.0
27	Harald Ambros	Miss Ferrari	Austria	8	0	8	61.2	69.2
28	Cedric Lyard	Fine Mervielle	France	12	1	13	57.6	70.6
29	Daniel Jocelyn	Silence	New Zealand	4	0	4	66.8	70.8
30	Niall Griffin	Lorgaine	(Republic of Ireland) Ireland	8	2	10	63.2	73.2
31	Giovanni Menchi	Hunefer	Italy	0	0	0	76.4	76.4
32	Susan Shortt	Just Beauty Queen	(Republic of Ireland) Ireland	12	0	12	64.8	76.8
33	Jennifer Eicher	Agent Mulder	Switzerland	12	0	12	65.0	77.0
33	Sara Algotson	Robin des Bois	Sweden	12	0	12	67.8	79.8
35	Stefano Brecciaroli	Cappa Hill	Italy	0	0	0	80.0	80.0
36	Tim Collins	Delton Magna	Bermuda	4	9	13	68.6	81.6
37	Hendrik Degros	Mr. Noppus	Belgium	0	0	0	82.2	82.2
38	Stuart Tinney	Jeepster	Australia	36	0	36	48.8	84.8
39	Kamil Rajnert	Marnego	Poland	4	8	12	75.2	87.2
40	Michael Winter	Balista	Canada	8	0	8	80.0	88.0
41	Bruce Mandeville	Larissa	Canada	12	0	12	77.2	89.2
42	Linda Algotsson	Stand By Me	Sweden	8	0	8	82.4	90.4
43	Dolf Desmedt	Bold Action	Belgium	4	0	4	88.2	92.2
44	Raul Senna	Super Rocky	Brazil	4	1	5	90.4	95.4
45	Harald Siegl	Gigant 2	Austria	12	0	12	83.8	95.8
46	Carlos Grave	Laughton Hills	Portugal	8	3	11	85.6	96.6
47	Rafael Gouveia Jr.	Mozart	Brazil	24	6	30	70.6	100.6
48	Fabio Magni	Vent d'Arade	Italy	12	0	12	88.8	100.8
49	Sasha Harrison	All Love du Fenaud	(Republic of Ireland) Ireland	8	0	8	94.4	102.4
50	Sergio Marins	Rally LF	Brazil	12	7	19	86.0	105.0
51	Pongsiree Bunluewong	Eliza Jane	Thailand	32	0	32	79.0	111.0
51	Andrzej Pasek	Dekalog	Poland	24	4	28	86.8	114.8
53	Eddy Stibbe	Dusky Moon	Netherlands Antilles	4	4	8	107.0	115.0
54	Andre Paro	Land Heir	Brazil	16	21	37	86.8	123.8
55	Garry Roque	Waikura	Canada	12	3	15	109.0	124.0
56	Susanna Bordone	Ava	Italy	12	3	15	110.0	125.0
57	Andrew Hoy	Mr Pracatan	Australia	16	0	16	119.4	135.4
58	Harald Riedl	Foxy XX	Austria	24	3	27	114.4	141.4
59	Remo Tellini	Especial Reserve	Brazil	44	7	51	97.2	148.2
60	Heidi Antikatzides	Michaelmas	Greece	12	5	17	131.8	148.8
61	Andrew Nicholson	Fenicio	New Zealand	8	6	14	135.6	149.6
62	Edmond Gibney	Kings Highway	(Republic of Ireland) Ireland	4	0	4	148.6	152.6
63	Pepo Puch	Banville d'Ivoy	Croatia	4	5	9	149.2	158.2
64	Hawley Bennett	Livingstone	Canada	12	0	12	156.0	168.0
65	Marisa Cortesi	Peppermint III	Switzerland	4	8	12	159.4	171.4
66	Pawel Spisak	Weriusz	Poland	8	0	8	166.4	174.4
67	Ian Roberts	Mata-riki	Canada	20	2	22	207.6	229.6
68	Margit Appelt	Ice on Fire	Austria	28	7	35	236.8	271.8
WD	William Fox-Pitt	Tamarillo	(United Kingdom) Great Britain	-	-	-	38.6	X
DNS	Ingrid Klimke	Sleep Late	Germany	-	-	-	41.0	X
WD	Olivia Bunn	Top of the Line	Australia	-	-	-	45.2	X
X	Arnaud Boiteau	Expo du Moulin	France	-	-	-	45.8	-
X	Joris Vanspringel	Over and Over	Belgium	-	-	-	56.0	-
X	Andreas Zehrer	Raemmi Daemmi	Austria	-	-	-	60.4	-
X	Viorel Bubau	Carnaval	Romania	-	-	-	80.0	-

=== Final results after Jumping final ===
A second round of jumping was used to determine final rankings. 25 pairs of horses and riders qualified, but only three from each NOC were allowed to compete.

As before, pairs received 4 penalty points for each obstacle knocked down, 4 penalty points for the horse's first disobedience, and 8 penalty points for the rider's first fall. They also received 1 penalty point for each second over the optimum time.

They could be eliminated for a second disobedience, the rider's second fall, the horse's first fall, or taking more than twice the optimum time to finish the course.

Rank	Rider	Horse	Nation	Faults	Time	Score	Phases 1-3	Total
1st place, gold medalist(s)	Leslie Law	Shear l'Eau	(United Kingdom) Great Britain	0	0	0	44.4	44.4
2nd place, silver medalist(s)	Kimberly Severson	Winsome Adante	United States	4	0	4	41.2	45.2
3rd place, bronze medalist(s)	Philippa Funnel	Primmore's Pride	(United Kingdom) Great Britain	4	0	4	42.6	46.6
4	Jean Teulere	Espoir de la Mare	France	4	0	4	46.4	50.4
5	Hinrich Romeike	Marius	Germany	4	2	6	45.2	51.2
6	Amy Tryon	Poggio II	United States	0	0	0	51.8	51.8
7	Heelan Tompkins	Glengarrick	New Zealand	4	0	4	48.0	52.0
8	Nicolas Touzaint	Galan de Sauvagere	France	16	3	19	33.4	52.4
9	Bettina Hoy	Ringwood Cockatoo	Germany	4	2	6	49.6	55.6
10	Constantin van Rijckevorsel	Withcote Nellie	Belgium	4	0	4	54.4	58.4
11	Rebel Morrow	Oaklea Groover	Australia	8	2	10	50.2	60.2
12	Darren Chiacchia	Windfall 2	United States	8	0	8	52.6	60.6
13	Phillip Dutton	Nova Top	Australia	12	0	12	50.8	62.8
14	Andreas Dibowski	Little Lemon	Germany	8	2	10	53.0	63.0
15	Matthew Grayling	Revo	New Zealand	4	0	4	59.2	63.2
16	Karin Donckers	Gormley	Belgium	8	0	8	56.4	64.4
17	Magnus Gallerdal	Keymaster	Sweden	8	0	8	63.8	71.8
18	Blyth Tait	Ready Teddy	New Zealand	4	0	4	69.0	73.0
19	Harald Ambros	Miss Ferrari	Austria	4	0	4	69.2	73.2
20	Mary King	King Solomon III	(United Kingdom) Great Britain	12	6	18	56.0	74.0
21	Mark Kyle	Drunken Disorderly	(Republic of Ireland) Ireland	8	0	8	67.0	75.0
21	Jaroslav Hatla	Jennallas Boy	Czech Republic	8	0	8	67.0	75.0
23	Niall Griffin	Lorgaine	(Republic of Ireland) Ireland	8	2	10	73.2	83.2
24	Giovanni Menchi	Hunefer	Italy	12	0	12	76.4	88.4
25	Didier Courrèges	Debat d'Estruval	France	24	21	45	60.6	105.6

== Final rankings ==
Four pairs did not qualify for the final jumping because three other pairs from their team had already qualified. Those four pairs have their positions after phase three in parentheses.

1. Leslie Law riding Shear l'Eau, Great Britain
2. Kimberly Severson riding Winsome Adante, United States
3. Philippa Funnel riding Primmore's Pride, Great Britain
4. Jean Teulere riding Espoir de la Mare, France
5. Hinrich Romeike riding Marius, Germany
6. Amy Tryon riding Poggio II, United States
7. Heelan Tompkins riding Glengarrick, New Zealand
8. Nicolas Touzaint riding Galan de Sauvagere, France
9. Bettina Hoy riding Ringwood Cockatoo, Germany
10. Constantin van Rijckevorsel riding Withcote Nellie, Belgium
11. Rebel Morrow riding Oaklea Groover, Australia
12. Darren Chiacchia riding Windfall 2, United States
13. Phillip Dutton riding Nova Top, Australia
14. Andreas Dibowski riding Little Lemon, Germany
15. Matthew Grayling riding Revo, New Zealand
16. Karin Donckers riding Gormley, Belgium
17. Magnus Gallerdal riding Keymaster, Sweden
18. Blyth Tait riding Ready Teddy, New Zealand
19. Harald Ambros riding Miss Ferrari, Austria
20. Mary King riding King Solomon III, Great Britain
21. Mark Kyle riding Drunken Disorderly, Ireland
22. Jaroslav Hatla riding Jennallas Boy, Czech Republic
23. Niall Griffin riding Lorgaine, Ireland
24. Giovanni Menchi riding Hunefer, Italy
25. Didier Courrèges riding Debat d'Estruval, France
26. Frank Ostholt riding Air Jordan, Germany..........(14th after three rounds)
27. Jeanette Brakewell riding Over to You, Great Britain.......... (18th after three rounds)
28. John Williams riding Carrick, United States.......... (21st after three rounds)
29. Julie Richards riding Jacob Two Two, United States.......... (23rd after three rounds)
30. Cedric Lyard riding Fine Mervielle, France
31. Daniel Jocelyn riding Silence, New Zealand
32. Susan Shortt riding Just Beauty Queen, Ireland
33. Jennifer Eicher riding Agent Mulder, Switzerland
34. Sara Algotson riding Robin des Bois, Sweden
35. Stefano Brecciaroli riding Cappa Hill, Italy
36. Tim Collins riding Delton Magna, Bermuda
37. Hendrik Degros riding Mr. Noppus, Belgium
38. Stuart Tinney riding Jeepster, Australia
39. Kamil Rajnert riding Marnego, Poland
40. Michael Winter riding Balista, Canada
41. Bruce Mandeville riding Larissa, Canada
42. Linda Algotsson riding Stand By Me, Sweden
43. Dolf Desmedt riding Bold Action, Belgium
44. Raul Senna riding Super Rocky, Brazil
45. Harald Siegl riding Gigant 2, Austria
46. Carlos Grave riding Laughton Hills, Portugal
47. Rafael Gouveia Jr. riding Mozart, Brazil
48. Fabio Magni riding Vent d'Arade, Italy
49. Sasha Harrison riding All Love du Fenaud, Ireland
50. Sergio Marins riding Rally LF, Brazil
51. Pongsiree Bunluewong riding Eliza Jane, Thailand
52. Andrzej Pasek riding Dekalog, Poland
53. Eddy Stibbe riding Dusky Moon, Netherlands Antilles
54. Andre Paro riding Land Heir, Brazil
55. Garry Roque riding Waikura, Canada
56. Susanna Bordone riding Ava, Italy
57. Andrew Hoy riding Mr Pracatan, Australia
58. Harald Riedl riding Foxy XX, Austria
59. Remo Tellini riding Especial Reserve, Brazil
60. Heidi Antikatzides riding Michaelmas, Greece
61. Andrew Nicholson riding Fenicio, New Zealand
62. Edmond Gibney riding Kings Highway, Ireland
63. Pepo Puch riding Banville d'Ivoy, Croatia
64. Hawley Bennett riding Livingstone, Canada
65. Marisa Cortesi riding Peppermint III, Switzerland
66. Pawel Spisak riding Weriusz, Poland
67. Ian Roberts riding Mata-riki, Canada
68. Margit Appelt riding Ice on Fire, Austria
- William Fox-Pitt riding Tamarillo, Great Britain (did not finish)
- Ingrid Klimke riding Sleep Late, Germany (did not finish)
- Olivia Bunn riding Top of the Line, Australia (did not finish)
- Arnaud Boiteau riding Expo du Moulin, France (did not finish)
- Joris Vanspringel riding Over and Over, Belgium (did not finish)
- Andreas Zehrer riding Raemmi Daemmi, Austria (did not finish)
- Viorel Bubau riding Carnaval, Romania (did not finish)
