= Swimming at the 2004 Summer Olympics – Women's 4 × 100 metre medley relay =

Women's 4 × 100 metre medley relay at the Games of the XXVIII Olympiad
- Venue: Olympic Aquatic Centre
- Dates: August 20, 2004 (heats); August 21, 2004 (final)
- Competitors: 77 from 16 nations
- Winning time: 3:57.32 WR

Medalists
1st place, gold medalist(s)		Giaan Rooney, Leisel Jones, Petria Thomas, Jodie Henry, Brooke Hanson*, Alice Mills*, Jessicah Schipper*	Australia
2nd place, silver medalist(s)		Natalie Coughlin, Amanda Beard, Jenny Thompson, Kara Lynn Joyce, Haley Cope*, Tara Kirk*, Rachel Komisarz*, Amanda Weir*	United States
3rd place, bronze medalist(s)		Antje Buschschulte, Sarah Poewe, Franziska van Almsick, Daniela Götz; *Indicates the swimmer only competed in the preliminary heats.	Germany

The women's 4 × 100 metre medley relay took place on 20–21 August at the Olympic Aquatic Centre of the Athens Olympic Sports Complex in Athens, Greece.

The Australians reinforced their claim to become the strongest women's team in the world with a convincing triumph over their American rivals in the event. Giaan Rooney, Leisel Jones, Petria Thomas, and Jodie Henry broke almost a full second off the world record set by Team USA in 2000, stopping the clock at 3:57.32. At the start of the race, the U.S. team got off to a flying start in the backstroke, until the Australians reeled them in on the butterfly leg. Thomas blasted a remarkable split of 56.67, the fastest of all-time in Olympic history, to overhaul Jenny Thompson of the U.S. team, and eventually move the Aussies in front of the race. The anchor freestyle leg left Henry to go up against Kara Lynn Joyce, and the Australians looked unbeatable with Henry, touching the wall first in 52.97, the second-fastest split of all-time.

Meanwhile, the U.S. team of Thompson, Joyce, Natalie Coughlin, and Amanda Beard settled only for the silver in 3:59.12, almost two seconds behind the Aussies. The Germans maintained their pace to earn a bronze, and finished in a European record of 4:00.72.

Competing in her fourth Olympics for Team USA, Thompson became the most decorated American athlete in history with her twelfth career medal, including 10 from the relays.

== Records ==
Prior to this competition, the existing world and Olympic records were as follows.

World record	United States (USA); Barbara Bedford (1:01.39); Megan Quann (1:06.29); Jenny Thompson (57.25); Dara Torres (53.37)	3:58.30	Sydney, Australia	23 September 2000
Olympic record	United States; Barbara Bedford (1:01.39); Megan Quann (1:06.29); Jenny Thompson (57.25); Dara Torres (53.37)	3:58.30	Sydney, Australia	23 September 2000

The following new world and Olympic records were set during this competition.

Date	Event	Swimmers	Nationality	Time	Record
August 21	Final	Giaan Rooney (1:01.18); Leisel Jones (1:06.70); Petria Thomas (56.67); Jodie Henry (52.97)	Australia	3:57.32	WR

== Results ==
=== Heats ===
Rank	Heat	Lane	Nation	Swimmers	Time	Notes
1	2	5	Australia	Giaan Rooney (1:01.99); Brooke Hanson (1:07.55); Jessicah Schipper (58.09); Alice Mills (53.54)	4:01.17	Q
2	1	4	United States	Haley Cope (1:01.96); Tara Kirk (1:07.08); Rachel Komisarz (58.75); Amanda Weir (55.03)	4:02.82	Q
3	1	5	Germany	Antje Buschschulte (1:02.47); Sarah Poewe (1:07.31); Franziska van Almsick (59.77); Daniela Götz (54.61)	4:04.16	Q
4	2	6	Great Britain	Sarah Price (1:01.90); Kirsty Balfour (1:09.19); Georgina Lee (59.56); Melanie Marshall (54.98)	4:05.63	Q
5	2	4	China	Zhan Shu (1:01.92); Qi Hui (1:09.90); Zhou Yafei (59.13); Zhu Yingwen (55.02)	4:05.97	Q
6	1	3	Japan	Noriko Inada (1:02.14); Masami Tanaka (1:09.17); Junko Onishi (59.45); Tomoko Nagai (55.23)	4:05.99	Q
7	2	7	Spain	Nina Zhivanevskaya (1:01.08); Sara Pérez (1:10.52); María Peláez (1:00.34); Tatiana Rouba (54.96)	4:06.90	Q
8	2	2	Netherlands	Stefanie Luiken (1:04.13); Madelon Baans (1:09.53); Chantal Groot (1:00.51); Marleen Veldhuis (54.55)	4:08.72	Q
9	1	1	Denmark	Louise Ørnstedt (1:02.71); Majken Thorup (1:11.46); Mette Jacobsen (59.21); Jeanette Ottesen (55.51)	4:08.89	
10	1	6	Ukraine	Kateryna Zubkova (1:03.66); Svitlana Bondarenko (1:09.36); Yana Klochkova (1:00.16); Olga Mukomol (56.61)	4:09.79	
11	2	1	Canada	Erin Gammel (1:02.57); Lauren van Oosten (1:09.57); Jennifer Fratesi (1:01.60); Brittany Reimer (56.10)	4:09.84	
12	2	8	Russia	Oxana Verevka (1:05.09); Elena Bogomazova (1:08.51); Natalya Sutyagina (58.98); Nataliya Shalagina (57.60)	4:10.18	
13	1	7	New Zealand	Hannah McLean (1:02.40); Annabelle Carey (1:11.98); Elizabeth Coster (1:00.38); Alison Fitch (55.61)	4:10.37	
14	2	3	France	Alexandra Putra (1:04.81); Laurie Thomassin (1.12.16); Aurore Mongel (1:00.40); Malia Metella (54.05)	4:11.42	
15	1	8	Switzerland	Dominique Diezi (1:04.06); Carmela Schlegel (1:12.04); Carla Stampfli (1:03.37); Nicole Zahnd (56.07)	4:15.54	
	1	2	Italy	Alessandra Cappa (1:03.11); Chiara Boggiatto (1:09.66); Ambra Migliori; Federica Pellegrini	DSQ	

=== Final ===
Rank	Lane	Nation	Swimmers	Time	Time behind	Notes
1st place, gold medalist(s)	4	Australia	Giaan Rooney (1:01.18) OC; Leisel Jones (1:06.50); Petria Thomas (56.67); Jodie Henry (52.97)	3:57.32		WR
2nd place, silver medalist(s)	5	United States	Natalie Coughlin (59.68) OR; Amanda Beard (1:06.32); Jenny Thompson (58.81); Kara Lynn Joyce (54.31)	3:59.12	1.80	
3rd place, bronze medalist(s)	3	Germany	Antje Buschschulte (1:00.72); Sarah Poewe (1:07.08); Franziska van Almsick (58.54); Daniela Götz (54.38)	4:00.72	3.40	EU
4	2	China	Chen Xiujun (1:02.00); Luo Xuejuan (1:08.82); Zhou Yafei (58.10); Zhu Yingwen (54.43)	4:03.35	6.03	
5	7	Japan	Reiko Nakamura (1:01.05); Masami Tanaka (1:09.09); Junko Onishi (59.14); Tomoko Nagai (55.55)	4:04.83	7.51	
6	8	Netherlands	Stefanie Luiken (1:04.83); Madelon Baans (1:09.55); Inge de Bruijn (58.85); Marleen Veldhuis (54.13)	4:07.36	10.04	
7	1	Spain	Nina Zhivanevskaya (1:01.29); Sara Pérez (1:10.62); María Peláez (1:00.74); Tatiana Rouba (54.96)	4:07.61	10.29	
	6	Great Britain	Katy Sexton (1:02.36); Kirsty Balfour (1:07.98); Georgina Lee (59.63); Kathryn Evans	DSQ		
