= Annabelle Collins =

Annabelle Collins may refer to:

- Annabelle Collins (Brookside), a character in Brookside played by Doreen Sloane
- Annabelle Collins (equestrian), Bermudian dressage rider
