= FC Porto (swimming) =

Portuguese swimming club

Club information
- Full name: Futebol Clube do Porto
- City: Porto, Portugal
- Founded: 1908
- Home pool: Piscina Municipal de Campanhã
- Chairman: André Villas-Boas

Swimming
- Head coach: José Silva
- League: Portuguese Championship
- 2017–18: Men – 3rd Women – 4th

The FC Porto swimming section was founded in 1908, and to this day is one of the most decorated swimming teams in Portugal. The club competes in Campeonato Nacional de Clubes em Natação (National Club Championship in Swimming) and has achieved multiple trophies both in the men and women departments.

The swimming section is part of the club heritage since its foundation, their first victory was the 'Taça Leixões' in 1908, and then the participation for the first time in the championship of Portugal occurred in 1919.

Names of famous athletes like Abel Guimarães, Adriano Antunes, Alexandrina Pinto, Alíria Silva, António Antunes, António Brenha, António Maria Pereira, Aristides Silva, Edgar Santos, Joaquim Lagoa, and so many others contributed for the club early success.

FC Porto achieved multiple national records, national, collective and individual titles, and attended at major international championships - European and World Championships.

== Honours ==
The section is one of the most decorated in Portuguese competitions, holding the record for most domestic league titles in the former absolut format (held from 1978 to 1986) and also in the women's department and the Portuguese cup (performance variant).

- Portuguese Championship (Absolut) (6) – record

1979–80, 1980–81, 1981–82, 1983–84, 1984–85, 1985–86

- Portuguese Championship (Men) (4)

1987–88, 1990–91, 1991–92, 1998–99

- Portuguese Championship (Women) (15) – record

1988–89, 1989–90, 1990–91, 1991–92, 1993–94, 1997–98, 1999–00, 2008–09, 2009–10, 2010–11, 2011–12, 2012–13, 2013–14, 2014–15, 2015–16

- Portuguese Cup (Performance) (6) – record

2008–09, 2009–10, 2010–11, 2011–12, 2012–13, 2014–15

- Portuguese Cup (Formation) (1)

2016–17

== Olympic athletes ==
In the olympics several athletes from the club stood out like Paulo Frischknecht (Montreal '76), Mabílio Albuquerque, Rui Borges and Sergio Esteves (Seoul '88), Joana Soutinho and Miguel Machado (Atlanta '96), Paulo Trindade (Seoul '88, Barcelona '92 and Atlanta '96), Mário Carvalho (Sydney '2000), Luís Monteiro (Athens '2004) and Sara Oliveira (Beijing '2008 and London '2012).

Athlete	Games	City	Event	Phase	Unit	Pos.	IT	CT	Rank	Ref.
(Portugal) Paulo Frischknecht	1976	Montreal	Men's 200 m freestyle	Round 1	Heat 5	7	2:02.65		51	
(Portugal) Paulo Frischknecht	1976	Montreal	Men's 100 m butterfly	Round 1	Heat 4	7	1:01.97		41	
(Portugal) Paulo Frischknecht	1976	Montreal	Men's 200 m butterfly	Round 1	Heat 4	5	2:20.51		37	
(Portugal) Paulo Frischknecht	1976	Montreal	Men's 4x200 m freestyle relay	Round 1	Heat 4	5	2:11.03	8:26.68	17	
(Portugal) Paulo Frischknecht	1976	Montreal	Men's 4x100 m medley relay	Round 1	Heat 2	8	1:06.80	4:20.84	14	
(Portugal) Mabílio Albuquerque	1988	Seoul	Men's 100 m butterfly	Round 1	Heat 2	2	0:57.30		33	
(Portugal) Mabílio Albuquerque	1988	Seoul	Men's 4x100 m freestyle relay	Round 1	Heat 1	5	0:53.06	3:33.31	14	
(Portugal) Rui Borges	1988	Seoul	Men's 400 m individual medley	Round 1	Heat 2	3	4:30.79		22	
(Portugal) Sérgio Esteves	1988	Seoul	Men's 50 m freestyle	Round 1	Heat 5	2	0:24.24		31	
(Portugal) Sérgio Esteves	1988	Seoul	Men's 4x100 m freestyle relay	Round 1	Heat 1	5	0:53.65	3:33.31	14	
(Portugal) Paulo Trindade	1988	Seoul	Men's 50 m freestyle	Round 1	Heat 6	5	0:24.02		30	
(Portugal) Paulo Trindade	1992	Barcelona	Men's 50 m freestyle	Round 1	Heat 7	8	0:23.81		36	
(Portugal) Paulo Trindade	1996	Atlanta	Men's 50 m freestyle	Round 1	Heat 5	5	0:23.73		40	
(Portugal) Joana Soutinho	1996	Atlanta	Women's 100 m breaststroke	Round 1	Heat 2	3	1:13.73		34	
(Portugal) Joana Soutinho	1996	Atlanta	Women's 4x100 m medley relay	Round 1	Heat 3	7	1:13.73	4:21.61	21	
(Portugal) Miguel Machado	1996	Atlanta	Men's 4x100 m medley relay	Round 1	Heat 4	DQ	(0:52.37)	(3:50.45)	–	
(Portugal) Mário Carvalho	2000	Sydney	Men's 200 m backstroke	Round 1	Heat 2	2	2:03.82		30	
(Portugal) Luís Monteiro	2004	Athens	Men's 200 m freestyle	Round 1	Heat 5	5	1:51.78		29	
(Portugal) Luís Monteiro	2004	Athens	Men's 4x200 m freestyle relay	Round 1	Heat 1	7	1:50.43	7:27.99	14	
(Portugal) Sara Oliveira	2008	Beijing	Women's 100 m butterfly	Round 1	Heat 3	3	0:59.48		35	
(Portugal) Sara Oliveira	2008	Beijing	Women's 200 m butterfly	Round 1	Heat 2	3	2:10.14 NR		19	
(Portugal) Sara Oliveira	2012	London	Women's 100 m butterfly	Round 1	Heat 3	7	1:00.44		36	
(Portugal) Sara Oliveira	2012	London	Women's 200 m butterfly	Round 1	Heat 1	3	2:11.54		24	

== Current squads ==
=== Men's squad ===
==== Seniors ====
- (Portugal) Carlos Santos
- (Portugal) Diogo Costa
- (Portugal) João Ascensão
- (Portugal) Luís Soares
- (Portugal) Samuel Belo
- (Portugal) Sérgio Baptista
- (Portugal) Tomás Silva

==== Juniors ====
- (Portugal) Diogo Santos
- (Portugal) Rafael Lino
- (Portugal) Tiago Soares
- (Portugal) Tomás Borges

=== Women's squad ===
==== Seniors ====
- (Portugal) Sara Oliveira
- (Portugal) Paula Oliveira
- (Portugal) Rosa Oliveira
- (Portugal) Mafalda Oliveira
- (Portugal) Maria Teresa Amorim

==== Juniors ====
- (Portugal) Ana Faria
- (Portugal) Íris Santos
- (Portugal) Maria Francisca Cabral
- (Portugal) Bárbara Magalhães
- (Portugal) Beatriz Silva
- (Portugal) Isabel Pego
- (Portugal) Maria Costa

== Current staff ==
Management Team
(Portugal) João Carvalho	Director
Technical team
(Portugal) José Silva	Coordinator
(Portugal) Paulo Nascimento	Assistant coach
(Portugal) Daniel Santos	Assistant coach
Medical team
(Portugal) André Moreira	Physician
(Portugal) Ferreira Pinto	Nurse
