= Carmela Schlegel =

Swiss swimmer

Personal information
- Born: 9 March 1983 (age 43) Chur, Graubünden, Switzerland
- Height: 1.68 m (5 ft 6 in)
- Weight: 57 kg (126 lb)

Sport
- Country: Switzerland
- Sport: Swimming
- Strokes: Breaststroke
- Club: SC Uster Wallisellen; SC Meilen
- Coach: Ralph Müller

Carmela Schlegel (born 9 March 1983) is a former Swiss swimmer who specialized in breaststroke events. She is a single-time Olympian (2004), a double Swiss champion, and a former national record holder in the 100 m breaststroke. Schlegel also played for Uster Wallisellen Swim Club (German: Schwimmclub Uster Wallisellen) in Uster, under her coach Ralph Müller.

Schlegel qualified for the women's 4×100 m medley relay, as a member of the Swiss team, at the 2004 Summer Olympics in Athens. Teaming with Dominique Diezi (backstroke), Carla Stampfli (butterfly), and Nicole Zahnd (freestyle), Schlegel swam the breaststroke leg and recorded a split of 1:12.04. Schlegel and the entire Swiss team finished the race in seventh place and fifteenth overall with a final time of 4:15.54.
