= Nicole Zahnd =

Swiss swimmer (born 1980)

Personal information
- Full name: Nicole Zahnd
- National team: Switzerland
- Born: 22 September 1980 (age 45) Bern, Switzerland
- Height: 1.73 m (5 ft 8 in)
- Weight: 58 kg (128 lb)

Sport
- Sport: Swimming
- Strokes: Freestyle
- Club: Vevey Natation; Genève Natation 1885
- Coach: Dirk Reinecke

Nicole Zahnd (born 22 September 1980) is a retired Swiss swimmer, who specialized in sprint freestyle events. She was born in Bern. She is a two-time Olympian (1996 and 2004), and a top 8 finalist in the 200 m freestyle at the 2001 European Short Course Swimming Championships in Antwerp, Belgium. Zahnd played for two swimming clubs in Geneva, before she trained under head coach Dirk Reinecke as part of the Swiss national team. Zahnd is also the wife of former medley swimmer and two-time Olympian Yves Platel (2000 and 2004).

Zahnd made her own swimming history, as a 16-year-old, at the 1996 Summer Olympics in Atlanta, finishing seventeenth as part of the Swiss relay team in the 4×100 m freestyle (3:53.30), and sixteenth in the 4×200 m freestyle (8:21.55).

After an eight-year absence, Zahnd competed in all relays from the swimming program at the 2004 Summer Olympics in Athens. On the first day of the Games, Zahnd teamed up with Dominique Diezi, Marjorie Sagne, and 16-year-old Seraina Prünte in the 4×100 m freestyle relay. Swimming the anchor leg, Zahnd recorded a split of 56.50, the fastest in Swiss history, and her team finished the race in seventh place and fifteenth overall in a final time of 3:48.61. Four days later, in the 4×200 m freestyle relay, Zahnd placed twelfth, along with Chantal Strasser, Hanna Miluska, and Flavia Rigamonti, in 8:10.41. In her final event, 4×100 m medley relay, Zahnd swam the anchor freestyle leg, with Diezi (backstroke), Carmela Schlegel (breaststroke), and Carla Stampfli (butterfly), to pull off another fifteenth-place effort for the Swiss team in a time of 4:15.54. In the race, Zahnd lowered her personal best to 56.07 seconds.
