= Tim Collins (equestrian) =

Bermudian equestrian

Personal information
- Nationality: Bermudian
- Born: 2 October 1975 (age 49)

Sport
- Sport: Equestrian

Tim Collins (born 2 October 1975) is a Bermudian equestrian. He competed in the individual eventing at the 2004 Summer Olympics.

He is the brother of Bermudian equestrian Annabelle Collins.
