= Annabelle Collins (equestrian) =

Bermudian dressage rider (born 1977)

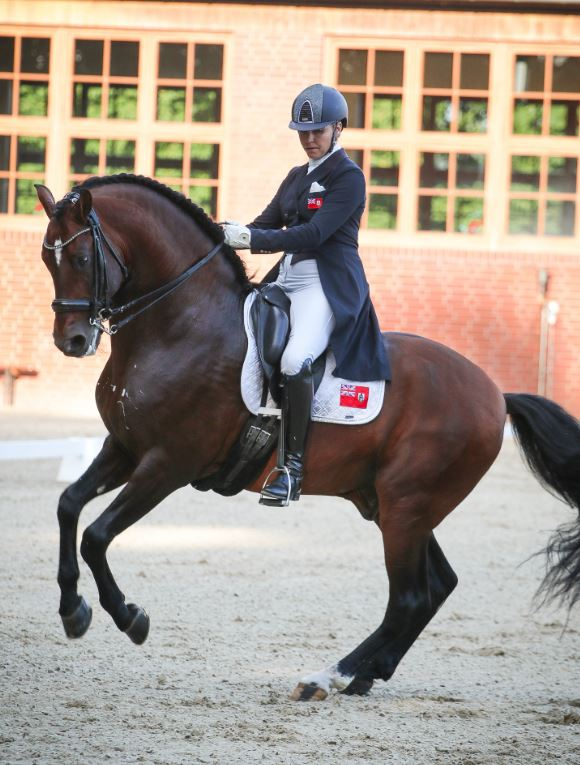

Personal information
- Full name: Annabelle Collins
- Born: 21 November 1977 (age 48) Hamilton, Bermuda

Sport
- Country: Bermuda
- Sport: Equestrian
- Coached by: Diederik Wigmans

Achievements and titles
- World finals: 2018 World Equestrian Games
- Personal best(s): 69.630% (GP); 73.995% (GPF)

Annabelle Collins (born 21 November 1977) is a Bermudian dressage rider. She has qualified to compete at the 2020 Tokyo Olympic Games.

== Career ==
Collins started riding on Bermuda as a child. She competed at local horse shows and regularly rode on the beach with her family and friends. She moved to Somerset and started eventing at age 14, before changing disciplines to dressage after witnessing the 1994 World Equestrian Games in person.

In 2000, she graduated from Bristol University with an honours degree in economics and accounting, and subsequently worked as an accountant for her family business.

She took part at the 2007 Pan American Games in Rio de Janeiro, where she placed 10th individually aboard Medici.

In 2018, Collins contested the World Equestrian Games in Tryon aboard PRE Joyero VG. She placed 57th. She then went on to qualify for the 2020 Olympics by virtue of placing 2nd in the Groups D/E rankings. In doing so, she became the first Bermudian dressage rider to secure Olympic qualification since Suzanne Dunkley did so in 1996.

== Personal life ==
Her brother Tim Collins competed in eventing at the 2004 Athens Olympics.
