= Marjorie Sagne =

Swiss swimmer

Personal information
- Full name: Marjorie Sagne
- National team: Switzerland
- Born: 3 March 1985 (age 41) Lausanne, Switzerland
- Height: 1.72 m (5 ft 8 in)
- Weight: 60 kg (132 lb)

Sport
- Sport: Swimming
- Strokes: Freestyle
- Club: Renens-Natation

Marjorie Sagne (born 3 March 1985) is a Swiss former swimmer, who specialized in freestyle events. She is a single-time Olympian (2004), and a six-time Swiss titleholder in the 100 m freestyle.

Sagne qualified for the women's 4 × 100 m freestyle relay, as a member of the Swiss team, at the 2004 Summer Olympics in Athens. Teaming with Dominique Diezi, Seraina Prünte, and Nicole Zahnd in heat two, Sagne swam a second leg and recorded a split of 57.17, but the Swiss women settled only for seventh place and fifteenth overall in a final time of 3:48.61.

In 2006, Sagne made her decision to retire from swimming, citing lack of motivation.
