= Miguel Machado =

Portuguese swimmer

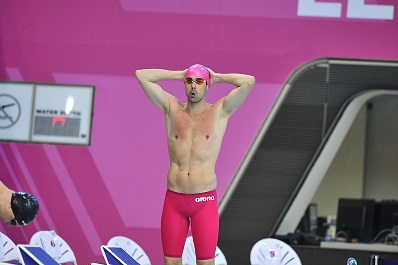
- Miguel Machado at the Masters European Swimming Championships - London 2016

Personal information
- Full name: Miguel Alexandre Cabral Machado
- National team: Portugal
- Born: 8 May 1975 (age 51) Porto, Portugal
- Height: 1.85 m (6 ft 1 in)
- Weight: 84 kg (185 lb)

Sport
- Sport: Swimming
- Strokes: Freestyle, medley, backstroke
- Club: FC Porto; Clube Naval do Funchal; City of Coventry Swim Team; Kenilworth Masters Swimming Club; Real Clube Fluvial Portuense; CLIP Teams
Medal record
Representing Portugal
Men's swimming
European Masters Championships (SC)
Gold medal – first place	2023 Madeira	50 m freestyle
Gold medal – first place	2023 Madeira	100 m freestyle
Bronze medal – third place	2023 Madeira	50 m backstroke
Bronze medal – third place	2023 Madeira	100 m medley

Miguel Alexandre Cabral Machado (born 8 May 1975) is a former competitive swimmer from Portugal, who competed at the 1996 Summer Olympics in Atlanta, Georgia in the 4x100 m medley relay on the freestyle leg.

Machado was born in Porto, Portugal. He attended the Faculty of Engineering at Porto University and the Strathclyde University, Glasgow, Scotland, where he swam for the City of Glasgow Swim Team.

He retired from competitive swimming in 2008, but in 2015, following a move back to the United Kingdom, Machado has returned to the pool and joined the City of Coventry Swim Team as a Masters swimmer. Since then, he has participated in several national and international Masters Swimming events, including in 2016, at the LEN European Masters Championships in London, Machado finished 4th place on the 100 m freestyle.

In 2017 in Budapest, at the World Aquatics Masters Championships, Machado swam the 50m, and also the 100m freestyle, where he finished 9th, setting a new Portuguese record for the distance.

In the summer of 2023, Machado competed at the World Aquatics Masters Championships in Fukuoka, Japan. Swimming in the 45-49 age group, he finished 4th (200 freestyle), 5th (100 freestyle and 200 individual medley) and 6th (50 backstroke).

Later that year Machado competed at the European Masters Short Course Swimming Championships. In his best-ever international performance, Machado won bronze on both the 100m individual medley and on the 50m backstroke and gold on the 50m and 100m freestyle, and setting 2 new Portuguese age group records.
