= Seraina Prünte =

Swiss swimmer (born 1987)

Seraina Then (Prünte)
Personal information
- Full name: Seraina Then (Prünte)
- National team: Switzerland
- Born: 16 August 1987 (age 38) Bern, Switzerland
- Height: 1.74 m (5 ft 9 in)
- Weight: 64 kg (141 lb)

Sport
- Sport: Swimming
- Strokes: Freestyle
- Club: SV Nikar Heidelberg (GER)
- Coach: Dirk Reinicke (SUI)

Seraina Then (Prünte) (born 16 August 1987) is a Swiss former swimmer, who specialized in freestyle events. She currently holds a Swiss record in the 100 m freestyle (56.06) from the German Olympic Trials in Berlin (2008). A single-time Olympian (2004), Prunte played for the Nikar Swimming Club (German: Schwimmverein Nikar) in Heidelberg, before she trained under head coach Dirk Reinecke as part of the Swiss national team.

Prunte qualified for the women's 4×100 m freestyle relay, as Switzerland's youngest swimmer (aged 16), at the 2004 Summer Olympics in Athens. Teaming with Dominique Diezi, Marjorie Sagne, and Nicole Zahnd in heat two, Prunte swam a third leg and recorded a split of 58.16, but the Swiss women settled only for seventh place and fifteenth overall in a final time of 3:48.61. Seraina is married to Fabian Then since 2023.
