= Carla Stampfli =

Swiss swimmer (born 1984)

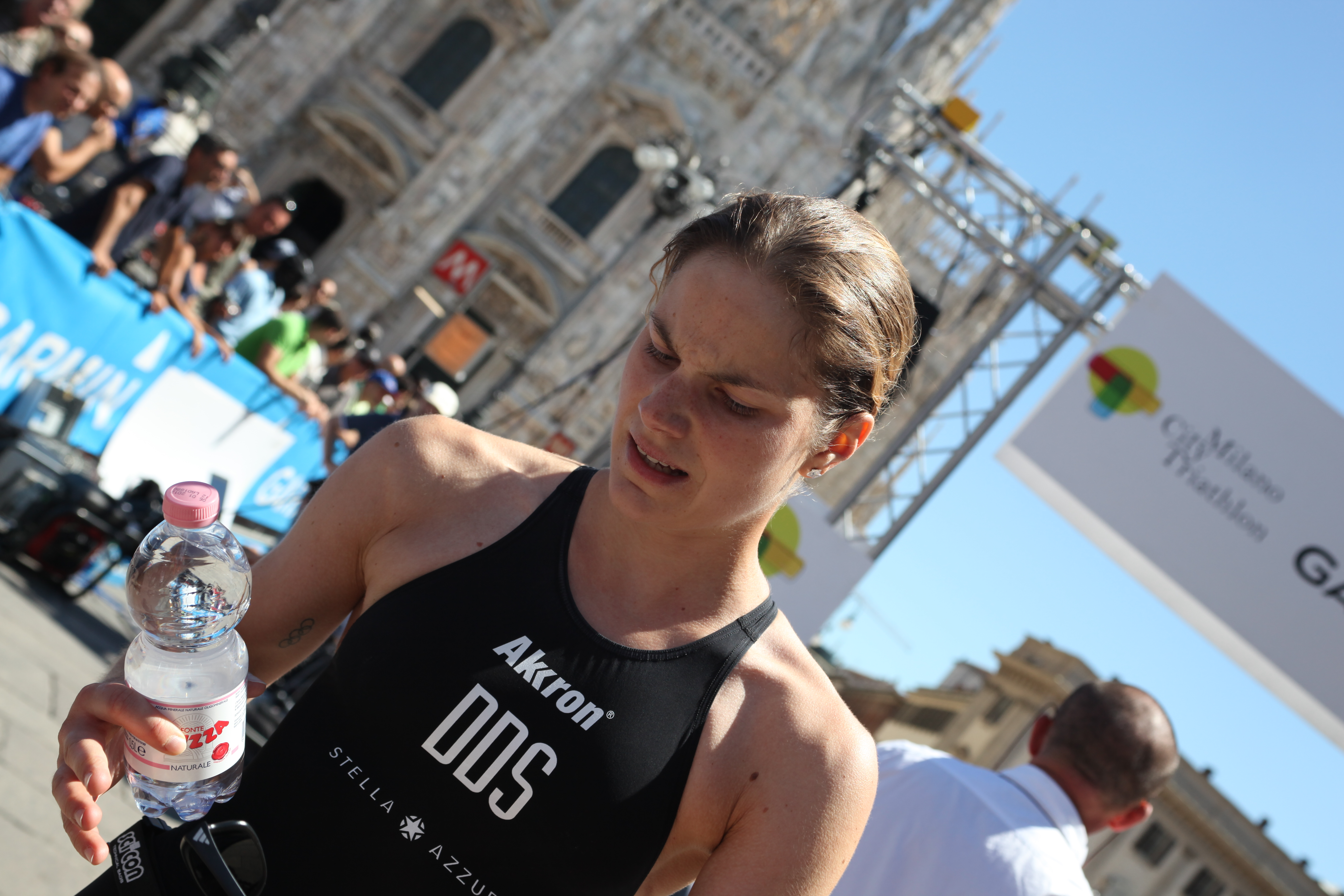

Personal information
- Full name: Carla Stampfli
- National team: Switzerland
- Born: 25 April 1984 (age 42) Zurich, Switzerland
- Height: 1.63 m (5 ft 4 in)
- Weight: 54 kg (119 lb)

Sport
- Sport: Swimming
- Strokes: Butterfly
- Club: SC Solothurn

Carla Stampfli (born 25 April 1984) is a Swiss former swimmer, who specialized in butterfly events and later became a professional triathlete. She is a single-time Olympian (2004), a 27-time Swiss swimming champion, and a short-course national record holder in the 100 m butterfly (2007).

Stampfli qualified for the women's 4×100 m medley relay, as a member of the Swiss team, at the 2004 Summer Olympics in Athens. Teaming with Dominique Diezi (backstroke), Carmela Schlegel (breaststroke), and Nicole Zahnd (freestyle), Stampfli swam the butterfly leg and recorded a split of 1:03.37. Stampfli and the entire Swiss team finished the race in seventh place and fifteenth overall with a final time of 4:15.54.

Five years later, in 2009, Stampfli embarked on a new career as a professional triathlete. She eventually earned her first title from the first meet of the 2012 Ironman 70.3 series in Pucón, Chile (4:38:03).
