= Viorel Bubău =

Romanian equestrian

Personal information
- Nationality: Romanian
- Born: 3 May 1961 (age 63)

Sport
- Sport: Equestrian

Viorel Bubău (born 3 May 1961) is a Romanian equestrian. He competed in the individual eventing at the 2004 Summer Olympics.
