= Miguel Pires =

Portuguese swimmer

Personal information
- Full name: Miguel Jerónimo Bento Martins Pires
- National team: Portugal
- Born: 16 July 1984 (age 41) Faro, Algarve, Portugal
- Height: 1.97 m (6 ft 6 in)
- Weight: 91 kg (201 lb)

Sport
- Sport: Swimming
- Strokes: Freestyle
- Club: Louletano Desporte Clube
- Coach: Luis Cardoso; Julio Borja

Miguel Jerónimo Bento Martins Pires (born July 16, 1984) is a Portuguese former swimmer, who specialized in freestyle events. He is a single-time Olympian (2004), and a member of Louletano Desporte Clube, under head coaches Luis Cardoso and Julio Borja.

Pires qualified for the men's 4 × 200 m freestyle relay, as a member of the Portuguese team, at the 2004 Summer Olympics in Athens. Teaming with Luís Monteiro, Adriano Niz, and João Araújo in heat one, Pires swam an anchor leg in a split of 1:50.71, but the Portuguese team finished the race in seventh place and fourteenth overall with a national record of 7:27.99.
