= Marisa Cortesi =

Swiss equestrian

Personal information
- Nationality: Swiss
- Born: 3 June 1970 (age 54); Chur, Switzerland

Sport
- Sport: Equestrian

Marisa Cortesi (born 3 June 1970) is a Swiss former equestrian. She competed in the individual eventing at the 2004 Summer Olympics.
