= Equestrian events at the 2020 Summer Olympics – Qualification =

The 200 quota places for equestrian at the 2020 Summer Olympics were divided between the three disciplines (75 for jumping, 65 for eventing, and 60 for dressage). The 2020 Summer Olympics were postponed to 2021 due to the COVID-19 pandemic. Teams in each discipline consisted of three horse and rider pairs; any NOC that qualified a team (20 teams for jumping, 15 each for eventing and dressage) also received 3 entries in the individual competition for that discipline. NOCs that did not qualify teams could earn one individual place in dressage and jumping, and up to two individual places in eventing, for a total of 15 entries in jumping and dressage and 20 for eventing. Teams qualify primarily through specific competitions (World Equestrian Games and continental tournaments), while individuals qualify through rankings. The host nation, Japan, automatically qualified a team in each discipline.

== Timeline ==
The following is a timeline of the qualification events for the equestrian events at the 2020 Summer Olympics.

Event	Date	Venue
2018 FEI World Equestrian Games	11–23 September 2018	(United States) Tryon
Group C eventing qualification event	23–26 May 2019	(Poland) Baborówko
Groups F/G eventing qualification event	23–26 May 2019	(France) Saumur
2019 Eventing Nations Cup	23 May – 13 October 2019	Various
Group C dressage qualification event	20–23 June 2019	(Russia) Moscow
Group C1 jumping qualification event	26–30 June 2019	(Russia) Moscow
Group C2 jumping qualification event	26–30 June 2019	(Hungary) Budapest
2019 Pan American Games	26 July – 11 August 2019	(Peru) Lima
Group G jumping qualification event	12–13 August 2019	(Netherlands) Valkenswaard
2019 European Dressage Championships	19–25 August 2019	(Netherlands) Rotterdam
2019 European Jumping Championships	19–25 August 2019	(Netherlands) Rotterdam
2019 European Eventing Championships	28 August – 1 September 2019	(Germany) Luhmühlen
2019 Jumping Nations Cup Final	3–6 October 2019	(Spain) Barcelona
Group F jumping qualification event	10–13 October 2019	(Morocco) Rabat
Group F dressage qualification event	24–27 October 2019	(Netherlands) Exloo
End of FEI ranking period	31 December 2019	—

== Qualification summary ==
Nation	Individual			Team			Total
Nation	Dressage	Eventing	Jumping	Dressage	Eventing	Jumping	Total
Argentina			3			Yes	3
Australia	3	3	3	Yes	Yes	Yes	9
Austria	3	2		Yes			5
Belarus		2					2
Belgium	3	1	3	Yes		Yes	7
Brazil	1	3	3		Yes	Yes	7
Canada	3	2	1	Yes			6
Chile	1		1				2
China		3	3		Yes	Yes	6
Colombia			1				1
Czech Republic		2	3			Yes	5
Denmark	3	1	1	Yes			5
Dominican Republic	1		1				2
Ecuador		1					1
Egypt			3			Yes	3
Estonia	1						1
Finland	1						1
France	3	3	3	Yes	Yes	Yes	9
Germany	3	3	3	Yes	Yes	Yes	9
Great Britain	3	3	3	Yes	Yes	Yes	9
Hong Kong		1					1
India		1					1
Ireland	1	3	3		Yes	Yes	7
Israel			3			Yes	3
Italy	1	3	1		Yes		5
Japan	3	3	3	Yes	Yes	Yes	9
Jordan			1				1
Latvia			1				1
Luxembourg	1						1
Mexico	1		3			Yes	4
Morocco	1		3			Yes	4
Netherlands	3	2	3	Yes		Yes	8
New Zealand		3	3		Yes	Yes	6
Norway			1				1
Poland		3			Yes		3
Portugal	3		1	Yes			4
Puerto Rico		1					1
ROC	3	2		Yes			5
Singapore	1						1
South Africa	1	1					2
South Korea	1						1
Spain	3	1	1	Yes			5
Sri Lanka			1				1
Sweden	3	3	3	Yes	Yes	Yes	9
Switzerland	1	3	3		Yes	Yes	7
Syria			1				1
Chinese Taipei			1				1
Thailand		3			Yes		3
Ukraine	1		1				2
United States	3	3	3	Yes	Yes	Yes	9
Total: 50 NOCs	60	65	75	15	15	20	200

== Dressage ==
=== Team ===
Event	Date	Venue	Vacancies	Qualified
Host Nation	–	–	1	Japan
2018 FEI World Equestrian Games	11–23 September 2018	(United States) Tryon	6	Germany; United States; Great Britain; Sweden; Netherlands; Spain
2019 European Dressage Championships Groups A/B	19–25 August 2019	(Netherlands) Rotterdam	2	Denmark; ~~Ireland~~^{2} Portugal
Group C qualification event	20–23 June 2019	(Russia) Moscow	1	ROC
2019 Pan American Games Groups D/E	26 July – 11 August 2019	(Peru) Lima	1	Canada; ~~Brazil~~^{1}
Group F qualification event	24–27 October 2019	(Netherlands) Exloo	0	~~South Africa~~^{1}
2018 FEI World Equestrian Games Group G	11–23 September 2018	(United States) Tryon	1	Australia
Composite teams	31 December 2019	–	3	France; Austria; Belgium
Total			15	

=== Individual ===
Event	Vacancies	Qualified
Team Members	45	See above
FEI Olympic Athletes Ranking – Dressage
Group A (North Western Europe)	1	Finland; ~~Norway~~^{3}
Group B (South Western Europe)	2	Luxembourg; Switzerland
Group C (Central & Eastern Europe; Central Asia)	2	Ukraine; ~~Belarus~~^{3} Estonia
Groups D/E (Americas)	4	Dominican Republic; ~~Bermuda~~^{4} Mexico; Brazil^{1} Chile
Group F (Africa & Middle East)	2	South Africa^{1} Morocco
Group G (South East Asia, Oceania)	2	~~New Zealand~~^{3} South Korea; Singapore
Additional	2	Ireland; Italy
Total	60	

^1 – Brazil and South Africa initially qualified a team, but failed to provide the NOC Certificate of Capability by 31 December 2019. As a result, their team quotas got reallocated to Composite teams, while Brazil and South Africa received one individual spot each from the respective regional groups.
^2 – Ireland withdrew their team spot, which got reallocated to Belgium.
^3 – Norway, Belarus and New Zealand withdrew their individual spots, which got reallocated to Italy, Estonia and Singapore, respectively.
^4 – Bermuda failed to confirm the minimum eligibility requirements (MER). Their quota place got reallocated to Chile.

== Eventing ==
=== Team ===
Event	Date	Venue	Vacancies	Qualified
Host Nation	–	–	1	Japan
2018 FEI World Equestrian Games	11–23 September 2018	(United States) Tryon	6	Great Britain; Ireland; France; Germany; Australia; New Zealand
2019 European Eventing Championships Groups A/B	28 August – 1 September 2019	(Germany) Luhmühlen	2	Sweden; Italy
Group C qualification event	23–26 May 2019	(Poland) Baborowko	1	Poland
2019 Pan American Games Groups D/E	26 July – 11 August 2019	(Peru) Lima	2	United States; Brazil
Groups F/G qualification event	23–26 May 2019	(France) Saumur	2	China; Thailand
2019 Eventing Nations Cup	23 May – 13 October 2019	Various	1	Switzerland
Total			15	

=== Individual ===
Event	Vacancies	Qualified
Team Members	45	See above
FEI Olympic Athletes Ranking – Eventing
Group A (North Western Europe)	2	Netherlands; Netherlands
Group B (South Western Europe)	2	Belgium; Spain
Group C (Central & Eastern Europe; Central Asia)	2	ROC; ROC
Group D (North America; English Caribbean)	2	Canada; Canada
Group E (Central & South America)	2	~~Chile~~^{5} Puerto Rico; Ecuador
Group F (Africa & Middle East)	1	South Africa; ~~Pakistan~~^{5}
Group G (South East Asia, Oceania)	2	India; Hong Kong
Additional	7	Czech Republic; Belarus; Belarus; Denmark; Czech Republic; Austria; Austria
Total	65	

^5 – Chile and Pakistan failed to confirm the minimum eligibility requirements (MER). Their quota places got reallocated to Ecuador and Austria, respectively.

== Jumping ==
=== Team ===
Event	Date	Venue	Vacancies	Qualified
Host Nation	–	–	1	Japan
2018 FEI World Equestrian Games	11–23 September 2018	(United States) Tryon	6	United States; Sweden; Germany; Switzerland; Netherlands; Australia
2019 European Jumping Championships Groups A/B	19–25 August 2019	(Netherlands) Rotterdam	3	Belgium; Great Britain; France
Group C1 qualification event	26–30 June 2019	(Russia) Moscow	1	Israel
Group C2 qualification event	26–30 June 2019	(Hungary) Budapest	1	~~Ukraine~~^{6} Czech Republic
2019 Pan American Games Groups D/E	26 July – 11 August 2019	(Peru) Lima	3	Brazil; Mexico; ~~Canada~~^{7} Argentina
Group F qualification event	10–13 October 2019	(Morocco) Rabat	2	Egypt; ~~Qatar~~^{7} Morocco
Group G qualification event	12–13 August 2019	(Netherlands) Valkenswaard	2	New Zealand; China
2019 Jumping Nations Cup Final	3–6 October 2019	(Spain) Barcelona	1	Ireland
Total			20	

=== Individual ===
Event	Vacancies	Qualified
Team Members	60	See above
2019 Pan American Games	4	Colombia; Dominican Republic; Canada; Chile
FEI Olympic Athletes Ranking – Jumping
Group A (North Western Europe)	2	Denmark; Norway
Group B (South Western Europe)	2	Italy; Portugal
Group C (Central & Eastern Europe; Central Asia)	2	Latvia; Ukraine^{6}
Group F (Africa & Middle East)	2	Syria; Jordan
Group G (South East Asia, Oceania)	2	Chinese Taipei; Sri Lanka
Additional	1	Spain
Total	75	

^6 – Ukraine initially qualified a team, but failed to provide the NOC Certificate of Capability by 31 December 2019. As a result, their team quota got reallocated to Czech Republic, while Ukraine received an individual spot from the respective regional group.
^7 – Canada and Qatar were disqualified from the respective qualifiers due to positive doping cases.
