= Adriano Niz =

Portuguese swimmer

Personal information
- Full name: Adriano Manuel Santos Niz
- National team: Portugal
- Born: 5 March 1986 (age 40) Póvoa de Varzim, Portugal
- Height: 1.81 m (5 ft 11 in)
- Weight: 73 kg (161 lb)

Sport
- Sport: Swimming
- Strokes: Freestyle
- Club: Clube Fluvial Vilacondense
- Coach: António Paulo Vasconcelos

Adriano Manuel Santos Niz (born 5 March 1986) is a Portuguese former swimmer, who specialized in freestyle events. He is a single-time Olympian (2004), and currently holds a Portuguese record in the 4×100 m freestyle relay at the 2008 European Aquatics Championships in Eindhoven, Netherlands (3:23.06). Niz also trains for Clube Fluvial Vilacondense, under head coach António Paulo Vasconcelos.

Niz qualified for the men's 4×200 m freestyle relay, as a member of the Portuguese team, at the 2004 Summer Olympics in Athens. Teaming with Luís Monteiro, João Araújo, and Miguel Pires in heat one, Niz swam a second leg in a split of 1:52.35, but the Portuguese team settled only for seventh place and fourteenth overall with a national record of 7:27.99.
