= João Araújo (swimmer) =

Portuguese swimmer

Personal information
- Full name: João Pedro Carvalho Araújo
- National team: Portugal
- Born: 20 October 1985 (age 40) Vila Nova de Famalicão, Portugal
- Height: 1.80 m (5 ft 11 in)
- Weight: 68 kg (150 lb)

Sport
- Sport: Swimming
- Strokes: Freestyle
- Club: GDN Vila Nova de Famalicão
- Coach: António Paulo Vasconcelos

João Pedro Carvalho Araújo (born October 20, 1985) is a Portuguese former swimmer, who specialized in freestyle events. He is a single-time Olympian (2004), and a member of GDN Vila Nova de Famalicão, under head coach António Paulo Vasconcelos.

Araujo qualified for the men's 4 × 200 m freestyle relay, as a member of the Portuguese team, at the 2004 Summer Olympics in Athens. Teaming with Luís Monteiro, Adriano Niz, and Miguel Pires in heat one, Araujo swam a third leg in a split of 1:54.50, but the Portuguese team settled only for seventh place and fourteenth overall with a national record of 7:27.99.
