= Luís Monteiro (swimmer) =

Portuguese swimmer

Personal information
- Full name: Luís Miguel Rodrigues Monteiro
- National team: Portugal
- Born: 22 January 1983 (age 43) Vila Nova de Gaia, Portugal
- Height: 1.91 m (6 ft 3 in)
- Weight: 80 kg (176 lb)

Sport
- Sport: Swimming
- Strokes: Freestyle
- Club: FC Porto
- Coach: Rui Sardinha

Luís Miguel Rodrigues Monteiro (Note: This name uses Portuguese naming customs: the first or maternal family name is Rodrigues and the second or paternal family name is Monteiro.) (born 22 January 1983) is a Portuguese former swimmer, who specialized in freestyle events. He is a fourth-place finalist in the 200 m freestyle (1:52.33) at the 2001 European Junior Swimming Championships in Valletta, Malta. Monteiro is a member of the swimming team for Football Club Porto (Portuguese: Futebol Clube do Porto), and is trained by long-time coach and mentor Rui Sardinha.

Monteiro qualified for two swimming events at the 2004 Summer Olympics in Athens, by clearing a FINA B-cut of 1:50.93 (200 m freestyle) from the World Championships in Barcelona, Spain. In the 200 m freestyle, Monteiro challenged seven other swimmers on the fifth heat, including three-time Olympian Jacob Carstensen of Denmark. He touched out Poland's Łukasz Drzewiński to take a fifth spot and twenty-ninth overall by 0.12 of a second in 1:51.78. He also teamed up with Adriano Niz, João Araújo, and Miguel Pires in the 4 × 200 m freestyle relay. Swimming the lead-off leg in heat one, Monteiro set his own personal best of 1:50.43, but the Portuguese team settled only for seventh place and fourteenth overall in a new national record of 7:27.99.
