= Carlos Grave =

Portuguese equestrian

Personal information
- Nationality: Portuguese
- Born: 7 June 1958 (age 66); Évora, Portugal

Sport
- Sport: Equestrian

Carlos Grave (born 7 June 1958) is a Portuguese equestrian. He competed in the individual eventing at the 2004 Summer Olympics.
