= Jennifer Eicher =

Swiss equestrian

Personal information
- Nationality: Swiss
- Born: 10 October 1962 (age 62); Saint Paul, Minnesota, United States

Sport
- Sport: Equestrian

Jennifer Eicher (born 10 October 1962) is a Swiss equestrian. She competed in the individual eventing at the 2004 Summer Olympics.
