= Stefanie Luiken =

Dutch swimmer (born 1985)

Personal information
- Full name: Stefanie Lucia Mariëlle Luiken
- Born: 16 May 1985 (age 41) Nijmegen, Netherlands
- Height: 1.76 m (5 ft 9 in)
- Weight: 67 kg (148 lb)

Sport
- Club: Philips Sport Vereniging (PSV), Eindhoven
Medal record
Women's swimming
Representing the Netherlands
European Championships
Bronze medal – third place	2004 Madrid	4×100 m medley relay

Stefanie Lucia Mariëlle Luiken (born 16 May 1985) is a Dutch former backstroke swimmer. She participated in the 2004 Summer Olympics and finished sixth with the Dutch 4 × 100 m medley relay team. She won a bronze medal at the 2004 European Aquatics Championships in the same event.

Luiken was born in Nijmegen, but later moved to Eindhoven to train at the Philips Sport Vereniging club. She won four national titles in backstroke: 50 m and 100 m in 2003 (25 m pool) and 100 m in 2004–2005. While preparing for the 2008 Olympics, she decided to retire from competitive swimming in March 2008.
