= Harald Riedl =

Austrian equestrian

Personal information
- Nationality: Austrian
- Born: 18 August 1961 (age 63)

Sport
- Sport: Equestrian

Harald Riedl (born 18 August 1961) is an Austrian equestrian. He competed in two events at the 2004 Summer Olympics.

During the Olympics, Riedel's mount, Foxy XX was found to have the prohibited substance flunixin in its system. Riedel was fined, disqualified from the competition and banned for three months.
