= Andreas Zehrer =

Austrian equestrian

Personal information
- Nationality: Austrian
- Born: 10 March 1966 (age 59); Barnbach, Austria

Sport
- Sport: Equestrian

Andreas Zehrer (born 10 March 1966) is an Austrian equestrian. He competed in two events at the 2004 Summer Olympics.
