= Margit Appelt =

Austrian equestrian (born 1975)

Personal information
- Nationality: Austrian
- Born: 14 January 1975 (age 50); Vienna, Austria

Sport
- Sport: Equestrian

Margit Appelt (born 14 January 1975) is an Austrian equestrian. She competed in two events at the 2004 Summer Olympics.
