= Dominique Diezi =

Swiss swimmer (born 1977)

Personal information
- Full name: Dominique Lorraine Diezi
- National team: Switzerland
- Born: 14 July 1977 (age 48) Zurich, Switzerland
- Height: 1.77 m (5 ft 10 in)
- Weight: 69 kg (152 lb)

Sport
- Sport: Swimming
- Strokes: Freestyle
- Club: SC Uster Wallisellen
- College team: Northwestern University (U.S.)

Dominique Lorraine Diezi (born 14 July 1977) is a Swiss former swimmer who specialized in sprint freestyle events. She is a two-time Olympian (1996 and 2004), a 32-time Swiss national champion, a multiple-time record holder in sprint freestyle (50 and 100 m), and a member of Switzerland's national swimming team (1992–2004). She also earned multiple All-American honors while studying in the United States.

Diezi made her first Swiss team at the 1996 Summer Olympics in Atlanta, where she finished thirty-second overall in the 50 m freestyle. She edged out Panama's Eileen Coparropa to lead the third heat by a tenth of a second (0.10) in 26.57. As a member of the Swiss relay team, she also placed seventeenth in the 4×100 m freestyle (3:53.30), and sixteenth in the 4×200 m freestyle (8:21.55).

Diezi sought her comeback at the 2004 Summer Olympics in Athens after an 8-year absence. She qualified again for three events by clearing a FINA B-cut of 57.30 (100 m freestyle) from the World Championships in Barcelona, Spain. In the 100 m freestyle, Diezi topped the third heat with her personal best of 56.67, but shared a twenty-sixth place tie with Slovenia's Sara Isaković from the preliminaries. She also helped out the Swiss team to pull off a fifteenth-place effort each in the 4×100 m freestyle (3:48.61), and in the 4×100 m medley (4:15.54).

Diezi was also a varsity swimmer for the Northwestern Wildcats and an assistant coach SMU Mustangs respectively. She graduated with a bachelor's degree in economics and international studies at Northwestern University in Evanston, Illinois (2001), and a master's degree in education at the Southern Methodist University in Dallas, Texas (2010).

In 2011, Diezi was named women's assistant coach for the Yale Bulldogs swimming and diving team at Yale University.
