= United States at the 2004 Summer Olympics =

- Flag of the United States
- IOC code: USA
- NOC: United States Olympic Committee

in Athens
- Competitors: 533 (279 men and 254 women) in 31 sports
- Flag bearers: Dawn Staley (opening); Mia Hamm (closing)
- Medals Ranked 1st: Gold 36 Silver 39 Bronze 26 Total 101

Summer Olympics appearances (overview)
- 1896; 1900; 1904; 1908; 1912; 1920; 1924; 1928; 1932; 1936; 1948; 1952; 1956; 1960; 1964; 1968; 1972; 1976; 1980; 1984; 1988; 1992; 1996; 2000; 2004; 2008; 2012; 2016; 2020; 2024; 2028

Other related appearances
- 1906 Intercalated Games

The United States of America (USA) competed at the 2004 Summer Olympics in Athens, Greece. 533 competitors, 279 men and 254 women, took part in 254 events in 31 sports.

== Medalists ==
The following U.S. competitors won medals at the games. In the discipline sections below, the medalists' names are bolded.

Medal	Name	Sport	Event	Date
Gold	Michael Phelps	Swimming	Men's 400 m individual medley	August 14
Gold	Aaron Peirsol	Swimming	Men's 100 m backstroke	August 16
Gold	Natalie Coughlin	Swimming	Women's 100 m backstroke	August 16
Gold	Mariel Zagunis	Fencing	Women's sabre	August 17
Gold	Michael Phelps	Swimming	Men's 200 m butterfly	August 17
Gold	Scott Goldblatt^{[a]} Klete Keller; Dan Ketchum^{[a]} Ryan Lochte; Michael Phelps; Peter Vanderkaay	Swimming	Men's 4 × 200 m freestyle relay	August 17
Gold	Adam Nelson	Athletics	Men's shot put	August 18
Gold	Paul Hamm	Gymnastics	Men's artistic individual all-around	August 18
Gold	Kimberly Rhode	Shooting	Women's double trap	August 18
Gold	Lindsay Benko^{[a]} Natalie Coughlin; Rhi Jeffrey^{[a]} Rachel Komisarz^{[a]} Carly Piper; Kaitlin Sandeno; Dana Vollmer	Swimming	Women's 4 × 200 m freestyle relay	August 18
Gold	Carly Patterson	Gymnastics	Women's artistic individual all-around	August 19
Gold	Aaron Peirsol	Swimming	Men's 200 m backstroke	August 19
Gold	Michael Phelps	Swimming	Men's 200 m individual medley	August 19
Gold	Amanda Beard	Swimming	Women's 200 m breaststroke	August 19
Gold	Matthew Emmons	Shooting	Men's 50 m rifle prone	August 20
Gold	Gary Hall Jr.	Swimming	Men's 50 m freestyle	August 20
Gold	Michael Phelps	Swimming	Men's 100 m butterfly	August 20
Gold	Ian Crocker; Mark Gangloff^{[a]} Brendan Hansen; Lenny Krayzelburg^{[a]} Jason Lezak; Aaron Peirsol; Michael Phelps^{[a]} Neil Walker^{[a]}	Swimming	Men's 4 × 100 m medley relay	August 21
Gold	Justin Gatlin	Athletics	Men's 100 m	August 22
Gold	Chris Ahrens; Wyatt Allen; Dan Beery; Peter Cipollone; Matt Deakin; Joseph Hansen; Beau Hoopman; Jason Read; Bryan Volpenhein	Rowing	Men's eight	August 22
Gold	Jeremy Wariner	Athletics	Men's 400 m	August 23
Gold	Chris Kappler; Beezie Madden; McLain Ward; Peter Wylde	Equestrian	Team jumping	August 24
Gold	Misty May; Kerri Walsh	Volleyball	Women's beach volleyball	August 24
Gold	United States women's national softball team: Leah Amico; Laura Berg; Crystl Bustos; Lisa Fernandez; Jennie Finch; Tairia Flowers; Amanda Freed; Lori Harrigan; Lovieanne Jung; Kelly Kretschman; Jessica Mendoza; Stacey Nuveman; Cat Osterman; Jenny Topping; Natasha Watley	Softball	Women's tournament	August 23
Gold	Shawn Crawford	Athletics	Men's 200 m	August 26
Gold	Dwight Phillips	Athletics	Men's long jump	August 26
Gold	Joanna Hayes	Athletics	Women's 100 m hurdles	August 26
Gold	United States women's national soccer team: Shannon Boxx; Brandi Chastain; Joy Fawcett; Julie Foudy; Mia Hamm; Angela Hucles; Kristine Lilly; Kristin Luckenbill; Kate Markgraf; Heather Mitts; Heather O'Reilly; Cindy Parlow; Christie Rampone; Briana Scurry; Lindsay Tarpley; Aly Wagner; Abby Wambach; Cat Whitehill	Football	Women's tournament	August 26
Gold	Timothy Mack	Athletics	Men's pole vault	August 27
Gold	Steven López	Taekwondo	Men's 80 kg	August 27
Gold	Derrick Brew; Otis Harris; Andrew Rock^{[a]} Jeremy Wariner; Darold Williamson; Kelly Willie^{[a]}	Athletics	Men's 4 × 400 m relay	August 28
Gold	Monique Henderson; Monique Hennagan; Moushaumi Robinson^{[a]} Sanya Richards; Dee Dee Trotter	Athletics	Women's 4 × 400 m relay	August 28
Gold	United States women's national basketball team: Sue Bird; Swin Cash; Tamika Catchings; Yolanda Griffith; Shannon Johnson; Lisa Leslie; Ruth Riley; Katie Smith; Dawn Staley; Sheryl Swoopes; Diana Taurasi; Tina Thompson	Basketball	Women's tournament	August 28
Gold	Kevin Burnham; Paul Foerster	Sailing	Men's 470 class	August 28
Gold	Cael Sanderson	Wrestling	Men's freestyle 84 kg	August 28
Gold	Andre Ward	Boxing	Light heavyweight	August 29
Silver	Erik Vendt	Swimming	Men's 400 m individual medley	August 14
Silver	Kaitlin Sandeno	Swimming	Women's 400 m individual medley	August 14
Silver	Lindsay Benko^{[a]} Maritza Correia^{[a]} Natalie Coughlin; Kara Lynn Joyce; Colleen Lanne^{[a]} Jenny Thompson; Amanda Weir	Swimming	Women's 4 × 100 m freestyle relay	August 14
Silver	Brendan Hansen	Swimming	Men's 100 m breaststroke	August 15
Silver	Jason Gatson; Morgan Hamm; Paul Hamm; Brett McClure; Blaine Wilson; Guard Young	Gymnastics	Men's artistic team all-around	August 16
Silver	Mohini Bhardwaj; Annia Hatch; Terin Humphrey; Courtney Kupets; Courtney McCool; Carly Patterson	Gymnastics	Women's artistic team all-around	August 17
Silver	Amanda Beard	Swimming	Women's 200 m individual medley	August 17
Silver	Rebecca Giddens	Canoeing	Women's slalom K-1	August 18
Silver	Bobby Julich	Cycling	Men's road time trial	August 18
Silver	Dede Barry	Cycling	Women's road time trial	August 18
Silver	Kimberly Severson	Equestrian	Individual eventing	August 18
Silver	Ryan Lochte	Swimming	Men's 200 m individual medley	August 19
Silver	Ian Crocker	Swimming	Men's 100 m butterfly	August 20
Silver	Lauryn Williams	Athletics	Women's 100 m	August 21
Silver	Larsen Jensen	Swimming	Men's 1500 m freestyle	August 21
Silver	Amanda Beard; Haley Cope^{[a]} Natalie Coughlin; Kara Lynn Joyce; Tara Kirk^{[a]} Rachel Komisarz^{[a]} Jenny Thompson; Amanda Weir^{[a]}	Swimming	Women's 4 × 100 m medley relay	August 21
Silver	Matt Hemingway	Athletics	Men's high jump	August 22
Silver	Terin Humphrey	Gymnastics	Women's uneven bars	August 22
Silver	Annia Hatch	Gymnastics	Women's vault	August 22
Silver	Alison Cox; Caryn Davies; Megan Dirkmaat; Kate Johnson; Laurel Korholz; Samantha Magee; Anna Mickelson; Lianne Nelson; Mary Whipple	Rowing	Women's eight	August 22
Silver	Michael Anti	Shooting	Men's 50 m rifle three positions	August 22
Silver	Mardy Fish	Tennis	Men's singles	August 22
Silver	Otis Harris	Athletics	Men's 400 m	August 23
Silver	Paul Hamm	Gymnastics	Men's horizontal bar	August 23
Silver	Carly Patterson	Gymnastics	Women's balance beam	August 23
Silver	Sara McMann	Wrestling	Women's freestyle 63 kg	August 23
Silver	Bryan Clay	Athletics	Men's decathlon	August 24
Silver	Allyson Felix	Athletics	Women's 200 m	August 25
Silver	Bernard Williams	Athletics	Men's 200 m	August 26
Silver	John Moffitt	Athletics	Men's long jump	August 26
Silver	Nia Abdallah	Taekwondo	Women's 57 kg	August 26
Silver	Terrence Trammell	Athletics	Men's 110 m hurdles	August 27
Silver	Toby Stevenson	Athletics	Men's pole vault	August 27
Silver	Chris Kappler	Equestrian	Individual jumping	August 27
Silver	Shawn Crawford; Justin Gatlin; Maurice Greene; Coby Miller; Darvis Patton^{[a]}	Athletics	Men's 4 × 100 m relay	August 28
Silver	John C. Lovell; Charlie Ogletree	Sailing	Tornado class	August 28
Silver	Stephen Abas	Wrestling	Men's freestyle 55 kg	August 28
Silver	Jamill Kelly	Wrestling	Men's freestyle 66 kg	August 28
Silver	Meb Keflezighi	Athletics	Men's marathon	August 29
Bronze	Klete Keller	Swimming	Men's 400 m freestyle	August 14
Bronze	Kaitlin Sandeno	Swimming	Women's 400 m freestyle	August 15
Bronze	Ian Crocker; Nate Dusing^{[a]} Gary Hall Jr.^{[a]} Jason Lezak; Michael Phelps; Neil Walker; Gabe Woodward^{[a]}	Swimming	Men's 4 × 100 m freestyle relay	August 15
Bronze	Jimmy Pedro	Judo	Men's 73 kg	August 16
Bronze	Michael Phelps	Swimming	Men's 200 m freestyle	August 16
Bronze	Sada Jacobson	Fencing	Women's sabre	August 17
Bronze	Darren Chiacchia; Julie Richards; Kimberly Severson; Amy Tryon; John Williams	Equestrian	Team eventing	August 18
Bronze	Brendan Hansen	Swimming	Men's 200 m breaststroke	August 18
Bronze	Natalie Coughlin	Swimming	Women's 100 m freestyle	August 19
Bronze	Diana Munz	Swimming	Women's 800 m freestyle	August 20
Bronze	Robert Dover; Debbie McDonald; Guenter Seidel; Lisa Wilcox	Equestrian	Team dressage	August 21
Bronze	Maurice Greene	Athletics	Men's 100 m	August 22
Bronze	Deena Kastor	Athletics	Women's marathon	August 22
Bronze	Courtney Kupets	Gymnastics	Women's uneven bars	August 22
Bronze	Derrick Brew	Athletics	Men's 400 m	August 23
Bronze	Patricia Miranda	Wrestling	Women's freestyle 48 kg	August 23
Bronze	Melissa Morrison	Athletics	Women's 100 m hurdles	August 24
Bronze	Holly McPeak; Elaine Youngs	Volleyball	Women's beach volleyball	August 24
Bronze	Alison Bartosik; Anna Kozlova	Synchronized swimming	Women's duet	August 25
Bronze	Susan Williams	Triathlon	Women's event	August 25
Bronze	Rulon Gardner	Wrestling	Men's Greco-Roman 120 kg	August 25
Bronze	Justin Gatlin	Athletics	Men's 200 m	August 26
Bronze	United States women's national water polo team: Robin Beauregard; Margaret Dingeldein; Ellen Estes; Jacqueline Frank; Natalie Golda; Ericka Lorenz; Heather Moody; Thalia Munro; Nicolle Payne; Heather Petri; Kelly Rulon; Amber Stachowski; Brenda Villa	Water polo	Women's tournament	August 26
Bronze	Andre Dirrell	Boxing	Middleweight	August 27
Bronze	Alison Bartosik; Tamara Crow; Erin Dobratz; Rebecca Jasontek; Anna Kozlova; Sara Lowe; Lauren McFall; Stephanie Nesbitt; Kendra Zanotto	Synchronized swimming	Women's team	August 27
Bronze	United States men's national basketball team: Carmelo Anthony; Carlos Boozer; Tim Duncan; Allen Iverson; LeBron James; Richard Jefferson; Stephon Marbury; Shawn Marion; Lamar Odom; Emeka Okafor; Amar'e Stoudemire; Dwyane Wade	Basketball	Men's tournament	August 28

Medals by sport
Sport	1st place, gold medalist(s)	2nd place, silver medalist(s)	3rd place, bronze medalist(s)	Total
Swimming	12	9	7	**28**
Athletics	9	11	5	**25**
Gymnastics	2	6	1	**9**
Shooting	2	1	0	**3**
Wrestling	1	3	2	**6**
Equestrian	1	2	2	**5**
Rowing	1	1	0	**2**
Sailing	1	1	0	**2**
Taekwondo	1	1	0	**2**
Basketball	1	0	1	**2**
Boxing	1	0	1	**2**
Fencing	1	0	1	**2**
Volleyball	1	0	1	**2**
Soccer	1	0	0	**1**
Softball	1	0	0	**1**
Cycling	0	2	0	**2**
Canoeing	0	1	0	**1**
Tennis	0	1	0	**1**
Synchronized swimming	0	0	2	**2**
Judo	0	0	1	**1**
Triathlon	0	0	1	**1**
Water polo	0	0	1	**1**
Total	36	39	26	101

Medals by day
Day	Date	1st place, gold medalist(s)	2nd place, silver medalist(s)	3rd place, bronze medalist(s)	Total
1	August 14	1	3	1	**5**
2	August 15	0	1	2	**3**
3	August 16	2	1	2	**5**
4	August 17	3	2	1	**6**
5	August 18	4	4	2	**10**
6	August 19	4	1	1	**6**
7	August 20	3	1	1	**5**
8	August 21	1	3	1	**5**
9	August 22	2	6	3	**11**
10	August 23	2	4	2	**8**
11	August 24	2	1	2	**5**
12	August 25	0	1	3	**4**
13	August 26	4	3	2	**9**
14	August 27	2	3	2	**7**
15	August 28	5	4	1	**10**
16	August 29	1	1	0	**2**
Total		36	39	26	101

Medals by gender
Gender	1st place, gold medalist(s)	2nd place, silver medalist(s)	3rd place, bronze medalist(s)	Total	Percentage
Male	23	23	11	**57**	56.4%
Female	12	16	13	**41**	40.6%
Mixed	1	0	2	**3**	3.0%
Total	36	39	26	101	100.0%

Multiple medalists
Name	Sport	1st place, gold medalist(s)	2nd place, silver medalist(s)	3rd place, bronze medalist(s)	Total
Michael Phelps	Swimming	6	0	2	**8**
Natalie Coughlin	Swimming	2	2	1	**5**
Amanda Beard	Swimming	3	0	0	**3**
Paul Hamm	Gymnastics	3	0	0	**3**
Carly Patterson	Gymnastics	3	0	0	**3**
Aaron Peirsol	Swimming	3	0	0	**3**
Ian Crocker	Swimming	1	1	1	**3**
Justin Gatlin	Athletics	1	1	1	**3**
Brendan Hansen	Swimming	1	1	1	**3**
Kaitlin Sandeno	Swimming	1	1	1	**3**
Jeremy Wariner	Athletics	2	0	0	**2**
Lindsay Benko	Swimming	1	1	0	**2**
Shawn Crawford	Athletics	1	1	0	**2**
Otis Harris	Athletics	1	1	0	**2**
Chris Kappler	Equestrian	1	1	0	**2**
Rachel Komisarz	Swimming	1	1	0	**2**
Ryan Lochte	Swimming	1	1	0	**2**
Derrick Brew	Athletics	1	0	1	**2**
Gary Hall Jr.	Swimming	1	0	1	**2**
Klete Keller	Swimming	1	0	1	**2**
Jason Lezak	Swimming	1	0	1	**2**
Neil Walker	Swimming	1	0	1	**2**
Annia Hatch	Gymnastics	0	2	0	**2**
Terin Humphrey	Gymnastics	0	2	0	**2**
Kara Lynn Joyce	Swimming	0	2	0	**2**
Jenny Thompson	Swimming	0	2	0	**2**
Amanda Weir	Swimming	0	2	0	**2**
Maurice Greene	Athletics	0	1	1	**2**
Courtney Kupets	Gymnastics	0	1	1	**2**
Kimberly Severson	Equestrian	0	1	1	**2**
Alison Bartosik	Synchronized swimming	0	0	2	**2**
Anna Kozlova	Synchronized swimming	0	0	2	**2**

^{a} Athletes who participated in the heats only.

== Archery ==
Three U.S. archers qualified each for the men's and women's individual archery, and a spot each for both men's and women's teams.

Men

Athlete	Event	Ranking round		Round of 64	Round of 32	Round of 16	Quarterfinals	Semifinals	Final / BM	
Athlete	Event	Score	Seed	Opposition Score	Opposition Score	Opposition Score	Opposition Score	Opposition Score	Opposition Score	Rank
Butch Johnson	Individual	660	16	van der Hoff (NED); L 135–145	Did not advance					
John Magera	Individual	637	47	Wang (TPE); L 144–159	Did not advance					
Vic Wunderle	Individual	639	43	Sawaiyan (IND); W 145–128	Liu (TPE); W 164–160	Xue (CHN); W 165–164	Galiazzo (ITA); L 108–109	Did not advance		
Butch Johnson; John Magera; Vic Wunderle	Team	1936	11	—N/a		Sweden; W 246–242	Italy; W 243–240	Chinese Taipei; L 243–244	Ukraine; L 235–237	4

Women

Athlete	Event	Ranking round		Round of 64	Round of 32	Round of 16	Quarterfinals	Semifinals	Final / BM	
Athlete	Event	Score	Seed	Opposition Score	Opposition Score	Opposition Score	Opposition Score	Opposition Score	Opposition Score	Rank
Stephanie Arnold	Individual	623	36	Jennison (AUS); L 121–132	Did not advance					
Janet Dykman	Individual	619	44	Williamson (GBR); L 121–147	Did not advance					
Jennifer Nichols	Individual	638	19	Puspitasari (INA); W 160–141	Berezhna (UKR); W 163–160	Yun (KOR); L 162–168	Did not advance			
Stephanie Arnold; Janet Dykman; Jennifer Nichols	Team	1880	9	—N/a		Greece; L 227–230	Did not advance			

== Athletics (track and field) ==
U.S. athletes have so far achieved qualifying standards in the following athletics events (up to a maximum of 3 athletes in each event at the 'A' Standard, and 1 at the 'B' Standard). The team was selected based on the results of the 2004 United States Olympic Trials.

Adam Nelson originally claimed a silver medal in men's shot put. On December 5, 2012, the International Olympic Committee and the IAAF stripped off Ukrainian shot putter Yuriy Bilonoh's gold medal after drug re-testings of his samples were discovered positive. Following the announcement of Bilonoh's disqualification, Nelson's medal was upgraded to gold.

Key

- Note–Ranks given for track events are within the athlete's heat only
- Q = Qualified for the next round
- q = Qualified for the next round as a fastest loser or, in field events, by position without achieving the qualifying target
- NR = National record
- N/A = Round not applicable for the event
- Bye = Athlete not required to compete in round

Men
Track & road events

Athlete	Event	Heat		Quarterfinal		Semifinal		Final	
Athlete	Event	Result	Rank	Result	Rank	Result	Rank	Result	Rank
Shawn Crawford	100 m	10.02	1 Q	9.89	1 Q	10.07	1 Q	9.89	4
Justin Gatlin	100 m	10.07	1 Q	9.96	1 Q	10.09	2 Q	9.85	1st place, gold medalist(s)
Maurice Greene	100 m	10.18	1 Q	9.93	1 Q	9.97	=2 Q	9.87	3rd place, bronze medalist(s)
Shawn Crawford	200 m	20.55	1 Q	19.95	1 Q	20.05	1 Q	19.79	1st place, gold medalist(s)
Justin Gatlin	200 m	20.51	2 Q	20.03	1 Q	20.35	1 Q	20.03	3rd place, bronze medalist(s)
Bernard Williams	200 m	20.29	1 Q	20.40	1 Q	20.18	2 Q	20.01	2nd place, silver medalist(s)
Derrick Brew	400 m	45.41	1 Q	—N/a		45.05	1 Q	44.42	3rd place, bronze medalist(s)
Otis Harris	400 m	45.11	2 Q	—N/a		44.99	2 Q	44.16	2nd place, silver medalist(s)
Jeremy Wariner	400 m	45.56	1 Q	—N/a		44.87	1 Q	44.00	1st place, gold medalist(s)
Jonathan Johnson	800 m	1:45.31	2 Q	—N/a		1:50.10	8	Did not advance	
Derrick Peterson	800 m	1:47.60	4	—N/a		Did not advance			
Khadevis Robinson	800 m	1:46.14	3	—N/a		Did not advance			
Charlie Gruber	1500 m	3:41.73	9	—N/a		Did not advance			
Grant Robison	1500 m	3:53.66	11	—N/a		Did not advance			
Alan Webb	1500 m	3:41.25	9	—N/a		Did not advance			
Tim Broe	5000 m	13:20.29	6 q	—N/a				13:33.06	11
Jonathon Riley	5000 m	13:38.79	14	—N/a				Did not advance	
Abdi Abdirahman	10,000 m	—N/a						28:26.26	15
Dan Browne	10,000 m	—N/a						28:14.53	12
Dathan Ritzenhein	10,000 m	—N/a						DNF	
Allen Johnson	110 m hurdles	13.45	=2 Q	DNF		Did not advance			
Duane Ross	110 m hurdles	13.39	2 Q	13.50	4 q	13.30	4	Did not advance	
Terrence Trammell	110 m hurdles	13.51	5 q	13.34	3 Q	13.17	2 Q	13.18	2nd place, silver medalist(s)
Bennie Brazell	400 m hurdles	48.57	2 Q	—N/a		48.19	2 Q	49.51	8
James Carter	400 m hurdles	48.64	1 Q	—N/a		48.18	1 Q	48.58	4
Angelo Taylor	400 m hurdles	48.79	1 Q	—N/a		48.72	4	Did not advance	
Anthony Famiglietti	3000 m steeplechase	8:31.59	8	—N/a				Did not advance	
Robert Gary	3000 m steeplechase	8:38.01	12	—N/a				Did not advance	
Daniel Lincoln	3000 m steeplechase	8:19.62	3 q	—N/a				8:16.86	11
Shawn Crawford; Justin Gatlin; Maurice Greene; Coby Miller; Darvis Patton^{[b]}	4 × 100 m relay	38.02	1 Q	—N/a				38.08	2nd place, silver medalist(s)
Derrick Brew; Otis Harris; Andrew Rock^{[b]} Jeremy Wariner; Darold Williamson; Kelly Willie^{[b]}	4 × 400 m relay	2:59.30	1 Q	—N/a				2:55.91	1st place, gold medalist(s)
Dan Browne	Marathon	—N/a						2:27:17	65
Alan Culpepper	Marathon	—N/a						2:15:26	12
Meb Keflezighi	Marathon	—N/a						2:11:29	2nd place, silver medalist(s)
Kevin Eastler	20 km walk	—N/a						1:25:20	21
John Nunn	20 km walk	—N/a						1:27:38	26
Tim Seaman	20 km walk	—N/a						1:25:17	20
Curt Clausen	50 km walk	—N/a						4:11:31	32
Philip Dunn	50 km walk	—N/a						4:12:49	35

Field events

Athlete	Event	Qualification		Final	
Athlete	Event	Distance	Position	Distance	Position
Walter Davis	Long jump	7.80	23	Did not advance	
John Moffitt	Long jump	8.17	5 Q	8.47	2nd place, silver medalist(s)
Dwight Phillips	Long jump	8.31	1 Q	8.59	1st place, gold medalist(s)
Kenta Bell	Triple jump	16.98	10 q	16.90	9
Walter Davis	Triple jump	16.94	11 q	16.78	11
Melvin Lister	Triple jump	16.64	18	Did not advance	
Tora Harris	High jump	2.15	17	Did not advance	
Matt Hemingway	High jump	2.28	11 Q	2.34	2nd place, silver medalist(s)
Jamie Nieto	High jump	2.28	=1 Q	2.34	4
Timothy Mack	Pole vault	5.70	11 Q	5.95 OR	1st place, gold medalist(s)
Derek Miles	Pole vault	5.70	16 Q	5.75	7
Toby Stevenson	Pole vault	5.70	=7 Q	5.90	2nd place, silver medalist(s)
John Godina	Shot put	20.53	4 Q	20.19	8
Reese Hoffa	Shot put	19.40	21	Did not advance	
Adam Nelson	Shot put	21.15	1 Q	21.16	1st place, gold medalist(s)
Casey Malone	Discus throw	63.27	7 q	64.33	6
Jarred Rome	Discus throw	61.55	13	Did not advance	
Ian Waltz	Discus throw	58.97	21	Did not advance	
Breaux Greer	Javelin throw	87.25	1 Q	74.36	12
A. G. Kruger	Hammer throw	69.38	32	Did not advance	
James Parker	Hammer throw	75.04	20	Did not advance	

Combined events – Decathlon

Athlete	Event	100 m	LJ	SP	HJ	400 m	110H	DT	PV	JT	1500 m	Final	Rank
Bryan Clay	Result	10.44	7.96	15.23	2.06	49.19	14.13	50.11	4.90	69.71	4:41.65	8820	2nd place, silver medalist(s)
Bryan Clay	Points	989	1050	804	859	852	958	873	880	885	670	8820	2nd place, silver medalist(s)
Tom Pappas	Result	10.80	7.38	16.17	2.03	47.97	14.18	47.39	NM	DNS		—	DNF
Tom Pappas	Points	906	905	862	831	911	951	816	0	DNS			DNF
Paul Terek	Result	10.92	6.94	15.15	1.94	49.56	15.12	45.62	5.30	50.62	4:50.36	7893	21
Paul Terek	Points	878	799	799	749	835	835	780	1004	598	616	7893	21

Women
Track & road events

Athlete	Event	Heat		Quarterfinal		Semifinal		Final	
Athlete	Event	Result	Rank	Result	Rank	Result	Rank	Result	Rank
LaTasha Colander	100 m	11.31	1 Q	11.20	3 Q	11.18	4 Q	11.18	8
Gail Devers	100 m	11.29	3 Q	11.31	4 q	11.22	7	Did not advance	
Lauryn Williams	100 m	11.16	1 Q	11.03	1 Q	11.01	1 Q	10.96	2nd place, silver medalist(s)
Allyson Felix	200 m	22.39	1 Q	22.69	1 Q	22.36	1 Q	22.18	2nd place, silver medalist(s)
Muna Lee	200 m	22.57	1 Q	22.74	1 Q	22.69	4 Q	22.87	=7
LaShauntea Moore	200 m	23.10	3 Q	22.96	3 q	22.93	6	Did not advance	
Monique Hennagan	400 m	51.02	1 Q	—N/a		49.88	1 Q	49.97	4
Sanya Richards	400 m	50.11	1 Q	—N/a		50.54	3 q	50.19	6
Dee Dee Trotter	400 m	50.56	2 Q	—N/a		50.14	2 Q	50.00	5
Hazel Clark	800 m	2:05.67	5	—N/a		Did not advance			
Jearl Miles Clark	800 m	2:01.33	2 Q	—N/a		1:58.71	3 q	1:57.27	6
Nicole Teter	800 m	2:01.16	3 Q	—N/a		1:59.50	4	Did not advance	
Carrie Tollefson	1500 m	4:06.46	6 q	—N/a		4:08.55	9	Did not advance	
Shayne Culpepper	5000 m	15:40.02	13	—N/a				Did not advance	
Shalane Flanagan	5000 m	15:34.63	11	—N/a				Did not advance	
Marla Runyan	5000 m	15:24.88	9	—N/a				Did not advance	
Elva Dryer	10,000 m	—N/a						32:18.16	19
Kate O'Neill	10,000 m	—N/a						32:24.04	21
Gail Devers	100 m hurdles	DNF		—N/a		Did not advance			
Joanna Hayes	100 m hurdles	12.71	1 Q	—N/a		12.48	1 Q	12.37 OR	1st place, gold medalist(s)
Melissa Morrison	100 m hurdles	12.76	1 Q	—N/a		12.53	2 Q	12.56	3rd place, bronze medalist(s)
Lashinda Demus	400 m hurdles	54.66	2 Q	—N/a		54.32	5	Did not advance	
Sheena Johnson	400 m hurdles	54.81	2 Q	—N/a		54.32	3 Q	53.83	4
Brenda Taylor	400 m hurdles	54.72	2 Q	—N/a		55.02	4 Q	54.97	7
LaTasha Colander; Marion Jones; Angela Williams; Lauryn Williams	4 × 100 m relay	41.67	1 Q	—N/a				DNF	
Crystal Cox^{[b]}^{[c]} Monique Henderson; Monique Hennagan; Sanya Richards; Moushaumi Robinson^{[b]} Dee Dee Trotter	4 × 400 m relay	3:23.79	1 Q	—N/a				3:19.01	1st place, gold medalist(s)
Colleen de Reuck	Marathon	—N/a						2:46:30	39
Deena Kastor	Marathon	—N/a						2:27:20	3rd place, bronze medalist(s)
Jennifer Rhines	Marathon	—N/a						2:43:52	34
Teresa Vaill	20 km walk	—N/a						1:38:47	43

^{b} - Athlete that ran in the heats only.
^{c} - In 2010, Cox admitted to using anabolic steroids from 2001 to 2004. She was stripped of her gold medal, but the remainder of the team kept their medals because IOC and IAAF rules at the time did not call for a team to be disqualified due to the doping offense of a runner that did not compete in the final.

Field events

Athlete	Event	Qualification		Final	
Athlete	Event	Distance	Position	Distance	Position
Marion Jones	Long jump	6.70	7 Q	~~6.85~~	DSQ
Rose Richmond	Long jump	6.46	19	Did not advance	
Grace Upshaw	Long jump	6.68	9 Q	6.64	9
Tiombe Hurd	Triple jump	13.98	22	Did not advance	
Yuliana Pérez	Triple jump	13.62	28	Did not advance	
Amy Acuff	High jump	1.95	=8 Q	1.99	4
Chaunté Howard	High jump	1.85	=28	Did not advance	
Tisha Waller	High jump	1.89	=16	Did not advance	
Jillian Schwartz	Pole vault	4.30	17	Did not advance	
Kellie Suttle	Pole vault	4.15	=24	Did not advance	
Laura Gerraughty	Shot put	16.47	26	Did not advance	
Kristin Heaston	Shot put	17.17	21	Did not advance	
Stephanie Brown	Discus throw	58.54	22	Did not advance	
Aretha Hill	Discus throw	58.82	19	Did not advance	
Seilala Sua	Discus throw	NM	—	Did not advance	
Kim Kreiner	Javelin throw	52.18	39	Did not advance	
Erin Gilreath	Hammer throw	66.71	20	Did not advance	
Jackie Jeschelnig	Hammer throw	62.23	39	Did not advance	
Anna Mahon	Hammer throw	64.99	29	Did not advance	

Combined events – Heptathlon

Athlete	Event	100H	HJ	SP	200 m	LJ	JT	800 m	Final	Rank
Shelia Burrell	Result	13.17	1.70	13.14	24.06	6.25	47.69	2:15.32	6296	4
Shelia Burrell	Points	1099	855	737	975	927	815	888	6296	4
Tiffany Lott-Hogan	Result	13.13	1.67	14.43	24.99	6.15	45.84	2:25.10	6066	20
Tiffany Lott-Hogan	Points	1105	818	823	888	896	780	756	6066	20
Michelle Perry	Result	12.74	1.70	11.28	22.91	6.02	38.36	2:13.69	6124	14
Michelle Perry	Points	1164	855	614	1088	856	636	911	6124	14

== Badminton ==
The United States had been represented in one out of five events.

Athlete	Event	Round of 32	Round of 16	Quarterfinal	Semifinal	Final / BM	
Athlete	Event	Opposition Score	Opposition Score	Opposition Score	Opposition Score	Opposition Score	Rank
Howard Bach; Kevin Han	Men's doubles	Carson / James (RSA); W 15–4, 15–1	Eriksen / Hansen (DEN); L 6–15, 4–15	Did not advance			

== Basketball ==
Summary

Team	Event	Group stage						Quarterfinal	Semifinal	Final / BM	
Team	Event	Opposition Score	Opposition Score	Opposition Score	Opposition Score	Opposition Score	Rank	Opposition Score	Opposition Score	Opposition Score	Rank
United States men	Men's tournament	Puerto Rico; L 73–92	Greece; W 77–71	Australia; W 89–79	Lithuania; L 90–94	Angola; W 89–53	4 Q	Spain; W 102–94	Argentina; L 81–89	Bronze medal game Lithuania; W 104–96	3rd place, bronze medalist(s)
United States women	Women's tournament	New Zealand; W 99–47	Czech Republic; W 80–61	South Korea; W 80–57	Spain; W 71–58	China; W 100–62	1 Q	Greece; W 102–72	Russia; W 66–62	Australia; W 74–63	1st place, gold medalist(s)

=== Men's tournament ===
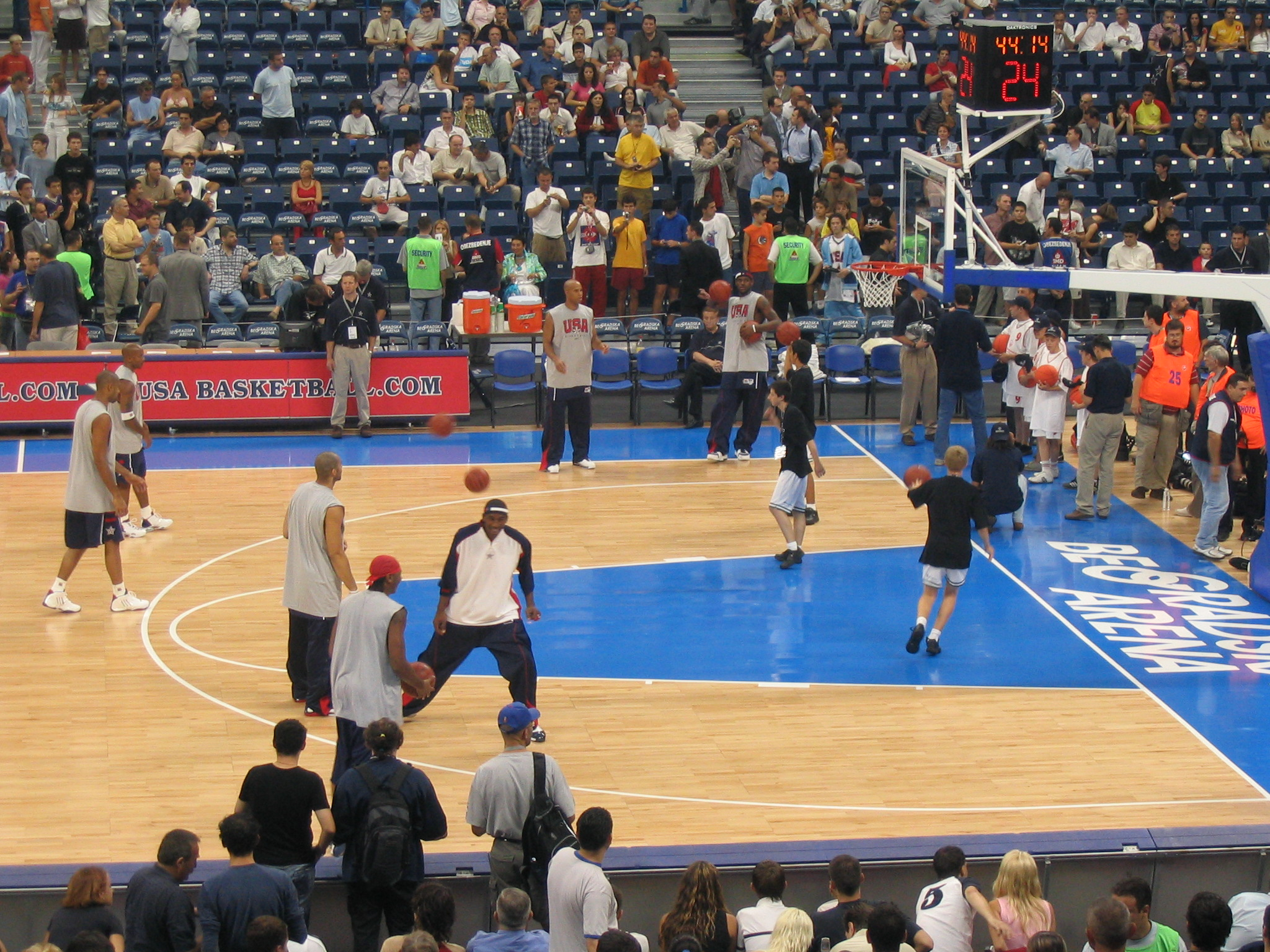
The warm-up for the pre-Olympic friendly match between Serbia and Montenegro and United States (Belgrade, Serbia and Montenegro, August 6, 2004).

Roster
The following is the United States roster in the men's basketball tournament of the 2004 Summer Olympics.

United States men's national basketball team – 2004 Summer Olympics roster
Players
Coaches

Pos.	No.	Name	Age – Date of birth	Height	Club	Ctr.
G	4	Allen Iverson (C)	29 – 7 June 1975	1.82 m (6 ft 0 in)	Philadelphia 76ers	(United States)
G	5	Stephon Marbury	27 – 20 February 1977	1.87 m (6 ft 2 in)	New York Knicks	(United States)
G	6	Dwyane Wade	22 – 17 January 1982	1.93 m (6 ft 4 in)	Miami Heat	(United States)
F	7	Carlos Boozer	22 – 20 November 1981	2.05 m (6 ft 9 in)	Cleveland Cavaliers	(United States)
F	8	Carmelo Anthony	20 – 29 May 1984	2.03 m (6 ft 8 in)	Denver Nuggets	(United States)
F	9	LeBron James	19 – 30 December 1984	2.03 m (6 ft 8 in)	Cleveland Cavaliers	(United States)
C	10	Emeka Okafor	21 – 28 September 1982	2.07 m (6 ft 9 in)	UConn Huskies	(United States)
F	11	Shawn Marion	26 – 7 May 1978	2.00 m (6 ft 7 in)	Phoenix Suns	(United States)
C	12	Amar'e Stoudemire	21 – 16 November 1982	2.08 m (6 ft 10 in)	Phoenix Suns	(United States)
F	13	Tim Duncan (C)	28 – 25 April 1976	2.10 m (6 ft 11 in)	San Antonio Spurs	(United States)
F	14	Lamar Odom	24 – 6 November 1979	2.08 m (6 ft 10 in)	Miami Heat	(United States)
G	15	Richard Jefferson	24 – 21 June 1980	2.00 m (6 ft 7 in)	New Jersey Nets	(United States)

Head coach

- (United States) Larry Brown

Assistant coach(es)

- (United States) Gregg Popovich
- (United States) Roy Williams
- (United States) Oliver Purnell

Legend

- (C) Team captain
- nat field describes country
  of last club
  before the tournament
- Age as of August 13, 2004

Group play

Pos	Team	Pld	W	L	PF	PA	PD	Pts	Qualification
1	Lithuania	5	5	0	468	414	+54	10	Quarterfinals
2	Greece	5	3	2	389	343	+46	8 (Note: Head-to-head record: Greece 1–1 (1.10 GAvg), Puerto Rico 1–1 (0.99), United States 1–1 (0.92))	Quarterfinals
3	Puerto Rico	5	3	2	410	411	−1	8	Quarterfinals
4	United States	5	3	2	418	389	+29	8	Quarterfinals
5	Australia	5	1	4	383	411	−28	6	9th place playoff
6	Angola	5	0	5	321	421	−100	5	11th place playoff

Source: FIBA archive
Rules for classification: 1) points; 2) head-to-head points; 3) head-to-head goal average; 4) head-to-head number of points scored.
Notes:

15 August 2004
20:00

Boxscore

Puerto Rico	92–73	United States
Scoring by quarter: 21–20, 28–7, 16–21, 27–25
Pts: Arroyo 24; Rebs: Ortiz 6 Asts: Arroyo 7		Pts: Duncan, Iverson 15 each Rebs: Duncan 16; Asts: Duncan 4

Helliniko Indoor Arena, Athens
Attendance: 11,560
Referees:
Zoran Šutulović (Serbia and Montenegro)
Vicente Bulto (Spain)

17 August 2004
22:15

United States	77–71	Greece
Scoring by quarter: 18–17, 19–14, 20–22, 20–18
Pts: Iverson 17; Rebs: Duncan 9 Asts: Marbury 6		Pts: Fotsis 22; Rebs: Papadopoulos 7 Asts: Papaloukas 6

Helliniko Indoor Arena, Athens
Attendance: 12,000
Referees:
Reynaldo Sanchez (Dominican Republic)
Vicente Bulto (Spain)

19 August 2004
14:30

United States	89–79	Australia
Scoring by quarter: 21–31, 26–20, 18–16, 24–12
Pts: Duncan 18; Rebs: Duncan 11; Asts: James, Marbury 5 each		Pts: Heal 17; Rebs: Andersen, Bogut 8 Asts: Heal 7

Helliniko Indoor Arena, Athens
Attendance: 12,000
Referees: José Ronfini (MEX), Giampaolo Cicoria (ITA)

21 August 2004
20:00

Lithuania	94–90	United States
Scoring by quarter: 23–26, 21–23, 23–20, 27–21
Pts: Jasikevičius 28; Rebs: Štombergas 10; Asts: Jasikevičius 4		Pts: Jefferson 20; Rebs: Duncan 20; Asts: Marbury 3

Helliniko Indoor Arena, Athens
Attendance: 12,000
Referees:
Reynaldo Sanchez (Dominican Republic)
Zoran Šutulović (Serbia and Montenegro)

23 August 2004
14:30

United States	89–53	Angola
Scoring by quarter: 23–14, 23–12, 29–13, 14–14
Pts: Duncan 15; Rebs: Boozer 9 Asts: James 5		Pts: Monteiro 20; Rebs: Gomes 6 Asts: Monteiro, Moussa 2 each

Helliniko Indoor Arena, Athens
Attendance: 12,000
Referees: Pablo Estevez (ARG), Philippe Leemann (SUI)

Quarterfinal

26 August 2004
14:30

Spain	94–102	United States
Scoring by quarter: 25–25, 18–19, 24–30, 27–28
Pts: Gasol 29; Rebs: Calderón 7 Asts: 3 players, 1 each		Pts: Marbury 31; Rebs: Marion, Odom 6 each Asts: Iverson, Marbury 4 each

Olympic Indoor Hall, Athens
Attendance: 14,500
Referees:
José Ronfini (Mexico)
Michael Aylen (Australia)

Semifinal

27 August 2004
20:00

Argentina	89–81	United States
Scoring by quarter: 24–20, 19–18, 27–19, 19–24
Pts: Ginóbili 29; Rebs: Oberto 6 Asts: Sánchez 7		Pts: Marbury 18; Rebs: Boozer 9 Asts: Iverson, Odom 3 each

Olympic Indoor Hall, Athens
Attendance: 14,500
Referees: Vicente Bulto (ESP), Zoran Šutulović (SCG)

Bronze medal game

28 August 2004
20:45

Lithuania	96–104	United States
Scoring by quarter: 24–24, 20–25, 27–25, 25–30
Pts: Macijauskas 24; Rebs: Javtokas 6 Asts: Jasikevičius 4		Pts: Marion 22; Rebs: Boozer, Duncan 8 each Asts: Wade 6

Olympic Indoor Hall, Athens
Attendance: 14,500
Referees:
Pablo Estevez (Argentina)
Giampaolo Cicoria (Italy)

=== Women's tournament ===
Roster
The following is the United States roster in the women's basketball tournament of the 2004 Summer Olympics.

United States women's national basketball team – 2004 Summer Olympics roster
Players
Coaches

Pos.	No.	Name	Age – Date of birth	Height	Club	Ctr.
G	4	Shannon Johnson	29 – 18 August 1974	1.82 m (6 ft 0 in)	San Antonio Silver Stars	(United States)
G	5	Dawn Staley	34 – 4 May 1970	1.65 m (5 ft 5 in)	Charlotte Sting	(United States)
G	6	Sue Bird	23 – 16 October 1980	1.75 m (5 ft 9 in)	Seattle Storm	(United States)
F	7	Sheryl Swoopes	33 – 25 March 1971	1.82 m (6 ft 0 in)	Houston Comets	(United States)
C	8	Ruth Riley	24 – 28 August 1979	1.95 m (6 ft 5 in)	Detroit Shock	(United States)
C	9	Lisa Leslie	32 – 7 July 1972	1.95 m (6 ft 5 in)	Los Angeles Sparks	(United States)
F	10	Tamika Catchings	25 – 21 July 1979	1.85 m (6 ft 1 in)	Indiana Fever	(United States)
F	11	Tina Thompson	29 – 10 February 1975	1.87 m (6 ft 2 in)	Houston Comets	(United States)
G	12	Diana Taurasi	22 – 11 June 1982	1.82 m (6 ft 0 in)	Phoenix Mercury	(United States)
F/C	13	Yolanda Griffith	34 – 1 March 1970	1.93 m (6 ft 4 in)	Sacramento Monarchs	(United States)
G	14	Katie Smith	30 – 4 June 1974	1.80 m (5 ft 11 in)	Minnesota Lynx	(United States)
F	15	Swin Cash	24 – 22 September 1979	1.87 m (6 ft 2 in)	Detroit Shock	(United States)

Head coach

- (United States) Van Chancellor

Assistant coach(es)

- (United States) Anne Donovan
- (United States) Gail Goestenkors
- (United States) Vivian Stringer

Legend

- (C) Team captain
- nat field describes country
  of last club
  before the tournament
- Age as of August 13, 2004

Group play

Pos	Team	Pld	W	L	PF	PA	PD	Pts	Qualification
1	United States	5	5	0	430	285	+145	10	Quarterfinals
2	Spain	5	4	1	368	334	+34	9	Quarterfinals
3	Czech Republic	5	3	2	408	375	+33	8	Quarterfinals
4	New Zealand	5	2	3	321	414	−93	7	Quarterfinals
5	China	5	1	4	360	406	−46	6	
6	South Korea	5	0	5	320	393	−73	5	

Source: FIBA archive
Rules for classification: 1) points; 2) head-to-head points; 3) head-to-head goal average; 4) head-to-head number of points scored.

14 August 2004
14:30

United States	99–47	New Zealand
Scoring by quarter: 28–13, 35–11, 16–15, 20–8
Pts: Cash 19; Rebs: Taurasi 9 Asts: Bird, Staley 3		Pts: Marino 13; Rebs: Loffhagen 7 Asts: Three players 1

Helliniko Indoor Arena, Athens
Attendance: 1,970
Referees:
Vladimir Okhrimenko (Russia)
Abdellilah Chlif (Morocco)

16 August 2004
14:30

Czech Republic	61–80	United States
Scoring by quarter: 21–18, 14–24, 15–23, 11–15
Pts: Klimešová 18; Rebs: Machová 5 Asts: Machová 5		Pts: Leslie 15; Rebs: Leslie 10; Asts: Staley 4

Helliniko Indoor Arena, Athens
Attendance: 954
Referees:
Giampaolo Cicoria (Italy)
Shoko Sugura (Japan)

18 August 2004
14:30

South Korea	57–80	United States
Scoring by quarter: 23–20, 9–19, 7–29, 18–12
Pts: Lee M 16; Rebs: Kim Y. 5 Asts: Kim Y., Lee M 3		Pts: Leslie 25; Rebs: Leslie, Thompson 7 Asts: Three players 3

Olympic Indoor Hall, Athens
Attendance: 2,000
Referees:
Michael Aylen (Australia)
Dallas Pickering (New Zealand)

20 August 2004
14:30

United States	71–58	Spain
Scoring by quarter: 19–16, 12–13, 19–12, 21–17
Pts: Leslie 19; Rebs: Leslie 9 Asts: Staley 6		Pts: Valdemoro 22; Rebs: Pascua 11; Asts: Palau 3

Helliniko Indoor Arena, Athens
Attendance: 1,352
Referees:
Christos Christodoulou (Greece)
Tatiana Steigerwald (Brazil)

22 August 2004
20:00

China	62–100	United States
Scoring by quarter: 13–27, 19–25, 13–23, 17–25
Pts: Ye 19; Rebs: Sui 6 Asts: Miao 3		Pts: Taurasi 19; Rebs: Griffith 11; Asts: Bird, Johnson 5

Helliniko Indoor Arena, Athens
Attendance: 1,653
Referees:
Vladimir Okhrimenko (Russia)
Abreu Joao (Mozambique)

Quarterfinal

25 August 2004
14:30

United States	102–72	Greece
Scoring by quarter: 27–19, 28–15, 21–19, 26–19
Pts: Johnson 21; Rebs: Griffith 11; Asts: Thompson 5		Pts: Kostaki 26; Rebs: Samoroukova 6 Asts: Kostaki 8

Olympic Indoor Hall, Athens
Attendance: 8,100
Referees:
Zoran Sutulovic (Serbia and Montenegro)
Dallas Pickering (New Zealand)

Semifinal

27 August 2004
14:30

Russia	62–66	United States
Scoring by quarter: 15–16, 18–21, 11–14, 18–15
Pts: Shchegoleva 13; Rebs: Baranova, Stepanova 8 Asts: Baranova 6		Pts: Thompson 14; Rebs: Griffit, Leslie 7 Asts: Leslie 3

Olympic Indoor Hall, Athens
Attendance: 3,740
Referees:
Pablo Estevez (Argentina)
Christos Christodoulou (Greece)

Gold medal game

28 August 2004
16:15

United States	74–63	Australia
Scoring by quarter: 17–14, 12–12, 23–24, 22–13
Pts: Thompson 18; Rebs: Leslie 8 Asts: Thompson 3		Pts: Taylor 16; Rebs: Jackson 14; Asts: Fallon, Jackson 2

Olympic Indoor Hall, Athens
Attendance: 10,120
Referees:
Chantal Julien (France)
José Reyes Ronfini (Mexico)

== Boxing ==
Athlete	Event	Round of 32	Round of 16	Quarterfinals	Semifinals	Final	
Athlete	Event	Opposition Result	Opposition Result	Opposition Result	Opposition Result	Opposition Result	Rank
Rau'shee Warren	Light flyweight	Zou (CHN); L 9–22	Did not advance				
Ronald Siler	Flyweight	Hore (AUS); W 32–18	Doniyorov (UZB); L 22–45	Did not advance			
Vicente Escobedo	Lightweight	Mosquera (COL); W RSC	Huseynov (AZE); L 18–36	Did not advance			
Rock Allen	Light welterweight	Bye	Georgiev (BUL); L 10–30	Did not advance			
Vanes Martirosyan	Welterweight	Meskine (ALG); W 45–20	Aragón (CUB); L 11–20	Did not advance			
Andre Dirrell	Middleweight	Dabateer (CHN); W 25–18	Kassel (ALG); W RSC	Despaigne (CUB); W 12–11	Golovkin (KAZ); L 18–23	Did not advance	3rd place, bronze medalist(s)
Andre Ward	Light heavyweight	Bye	Russo (ITA); W 17–9	Makarenko (RUS); W 23–16	Haydarov (UZB); W 17–15	Aripgadjiev (BLR); W 20–13	1st place, gold medalist(s)
Devin Vargas	Heavyweight	—N/a	El Haddak (MAR); W RSC	Zuyev (BLR); L 27–36	Did not advance		
Jason Estrada	Super heavyweight	—N/a	Hawke (TGA); W 30–11	López (CUB); L 7–21	Did not advance		

== Canoeing ==
=== Slalom ===
Athlete	Event	Preliminary						Semifinal		Final			
Athlete	Event	Run 1	Rank	Run 2	Rank	Total	Rank	Time	Rank	Time	Rank	Total	Rank
Chris Ennis Jr.	Men's C-1	156.94	16	133.79	16	290.73	16	Did not advance					
Brett Heyl	Men's K-1	95.68	7	96.61	=7	192.29	5 Q	100.28	15	Did not advance			
Scott Parsons	Men's K-1	98.15	12	100.06	19	198.21	14 Q	96.82	9 Q	97.94	6	194.76	6
Joe Jacobi; Matt Taylor	Men's C-2	116.01	9	107.42	4	223.43	6 Q	111.14	8	Did not advance			
Rebecca Giddens	Women's K-1	108.36	3	116.58	15	224.94	5 Q	107.56	4 Q	107.06	2	214.62	2nd place, silver medalist(s)

=== Sprint ===
Men

Athlete	Event	Heats		Semifinals		Final	
Athlete	Event	Time	Rank	Time	Rank	Time	Rank
Benjamin Lewis	K-1 1000 m	3:43.052	7 q	3:47.426	9	Did not advance	
Rami Zur	K-1 500 m	1:40.349	2 q	1:40.727	4	Did not advance	
Andrew Bussey; Jeffrey Smoke	K-2 1000 m	3:17.268	7 q	3:16.341	7	Did not advance	
Nathan Johnson; Jordan Malloch	C-2 500 m	1:48.172	7 q	1:46.424	8	Did not advance	
Nathan Johnson; Jordan Malloch	C-2 1000 m	3:50.735	7 q	3:46.036	8	Did not advance	
Bartosz Wolski; Rami Zur	K-2 500 m	1:31.893	4 q	1:33.482	6	Did not advance	

Women

Athlete	Event	Heats		Semifinals		Final	
Athlete	Event	Time	Rank	Time	Rank	Time	Rank
Carrie Johnson	K-1 500 m	1:57.708	5 q	1:56.712	4	Did not advance	
Kathryn Colin; Lauren Spalding	K-2 500 m	1:45.158	6 q	1:46.786	7	Did not advance	
Kathryn Colin; Carrie Johnson; Marie Mijalis; Lauren Spalding	K-4 500 m	1:36.994	5 q	1:35.869	4	Did not advance	

Qualification Legend: Q = Qualify to final; q = Qualify to semifinal

== Cycling ==
=== Road ===
Men

Athlete	Event	Time	Rank
Tyler Hamilton	Road race	5:41:56	DSQ
George Hincapie	Road race	5:41:56	24
Bobby Julich	Road race	5:41:56	28
Levi Leipheimer	Road race	Did not finish	
Jason McCartney	Road race	Did not finish	
Tyler Hamilton	Time trial	57:31.74	DSQ
Bobby Julich	Time trial	57:58.19	2nd place, silver medalist(s)

Women

Athlete	Event	Time	Rank
Kristin Armstrong	Road race	3:25:06	8
Dede Barry	Road race	3:25:42	16
Christine Thorburn	Road race	3:25:42	15
Dede Barry	Time trial	31:35.62	2nd place, silver medalist(s)
Christine Thorburn	Time trial	32:14.82	4

=== Track ===
Sprint

Athlete	Event	Qualification		Round 1	Repechage 1	Quarterfinals	Semifinals	Final	
Athlete	Event	Time Speed (km/h)	Rank	Opposition Time Speed (km/h)	Opposition Time Speed (km/h)	Opposition Time Speed (km/h)	Opposition Time Speed (km/h)	Opposition Time Speed (km/h)	Rank
Jennie Reed	Women's sprint	11.622; 61.951	9	Muenzer (CAN); L	Grankovskaya (RUS); Radanova (BUL); L	Did not advance			
Adam Duvendeck; Giddeon Massie; Christian Stahl	Men's team sprint	45.742; 59.026	11	Did not advance					

Pursuit

Athlete	Event	Qualification		Semifinals		Final	
Athlete	Event	Time	Rank	Opponent Results	Rank	Opponent Results	Rank
Erin Mirabella	Women's individual pursuit	3:36.992	10	Did not advance			

Keirin

Athlete	Event	1st round	Repechage	2nd round	Final
Athlete	Event	Rank	Rank	Rank	Rank
Marty Nothstein	Men's keirin	3 R	4	Did not advance	

Points race

Athlete	Event	Points	Laps	Rank
Colby Pearce	Men's points race	23	1	14
Erin Mirabella	Women's points race	9	0	4

=== Mountain biking ===
Athlete	Event	Time	Rank
Jeremy Horgan-Kobelski	Men's cross-country	2:25:28	21
Todd Wells	Men's cross-country	2:24:37	19
Mary McConneloug	Women's cross-country	2:06:12	9

== Diving ==
U.S. divers qualified for eight individual diving spots at the 2004 Olympic Games. Three US synchronized diving teams qualified through the 2004 FINA Diving World Cup and the rest of the divers qualified for the Olympics through the 2004 U.S. Olympic Trials for diving.

Men

Athlete	Event	Preliminaries		Semifinals		Final	
Athlete	Event	Points	Rank	Points	Rank	Points	Rank
Troy Dumais	3 m springboard	452.76	5 Q	692.67	6 Q	701.46	6
Justin Wilcock	3 m springboard	225.87	32	Did not advance			
Caesar Garcia	10 m platform	388.77	23	Did not advance			
Kyle Prandi	10 m platform	346.53	29	Did not advance			
Justin Dumais; Troy Dumais	3 m synchronized springboard	—N/a				327.06	6
Kyle Prandi; Mark Ruiz	10 m synchronized platform	—N/a				325.44	8

Women

Athlete	Event	Preliminaries		Semifinals		Final	
Athlete	Event	Points	Rank	Points	Rank	Points	Rank
Rachelle Kunkel	3 m springboard	294.75	12 Q	504.51	12 Q	546.72	9
Kimiko Soldati	3 m springboard	252.36	21	Did not advance			
Sara Hildebrand	10 m platform	308.49	14 Q	489.18	11 Q	484.77	10
Laura Wilkinson	10 m platform	314.19	13 Q	508.71	10 Q	549.72	5
Cassandra Cardinell; Sara Hildebrand	10 m synchronized platform	—N/a				302.22	7

== Equestrian ==
Because only three horse and rider pairs from each nation could advance beyond certain rounds in the individual events, five American pairs did not advance despite being placed sufficiently high. They received rankings below all pairs that did advance.

Dressage

Athlete	Horse	Event	Grand Prix		Grand Prix Special		Grand Prix Freestyle		Overall	
Athlete	Horse	Event	Score	Rank	Score	Rank	Score	Rank	Score	Rank
Robert Dover	Kennedy	Individual	71.625	9 Q	74.040	6 Q	78.475	7	74.713	6
Debbie McDonald	Brentina	Individual	73.375	5 Q	74.760	4 Q	78.825	6	75.653	4
Guenter Seidel	Aragon	Individual	69.500	16 Q	71.040	13 Q	73.800	13	71.447	14
Lisa Wilcox	Relevant 5	Individual	68.792	18	Did not advance					
Robert Dover; Debbie McDonald; Guenter Seidel; Lisa Wilcox	See above	Team	—N/a						71.500	3rd place, bronze medalist(s)

Eventing

Athlete	Horse	Event	Dressage		Cross-country			Jumping					
Athlete	Horse	Event	Dressage		Cross-country			Qualifier			Final		
Athlete	Horse	Event	Penalties	Rank	Penalties	Total	Rank	Penalties	Total	Rank	Penalties	Total	Rank
Darren Chiacchia	Windfall II	Individual	44.60	15	0.00	44.60	12	8.00	52.60	12 Q	8.00	60.60	12
Julie Richards	Jacob Two Two	Individual	~~65.40~~	57	1.60	~~67.00~~	36	0.00	~~67.00~~	=23	Did not advance		
Kimberly Severson	Winsome Andante	Individual	36.20	5	0.00	36.20	3	5.00	41.20	2 Q	4.00	45.20	2nd place, silver medalist(s)
Amy Tryon	Poggio II	Individual	~~50.60~~	30	1.20	~~51.80~~	22	0.00	51.80	11 Q	0.00	51.80	6
John Williams	Carrick	Individual	47.60	24	1.20	48.80	=19	12.00	~~60.80~~	21	Did not advance		
Darren Chiacchia; Julie Richards; Kimberly Severson; Amy Tryon; John Williams	See above	Team	128.40	4	—N/a	129.60	=3	—N/a	145.60	3rd place, bronze medalist(s)	—N/a		

Jumping

Athlete	Horse	Event	Qualification								Final					
Athlete	Horse	Event	Round 1		Round 2			Round 3			Round A		Round B		Total	
Athlete	Horse	Event	Penalties	Rank	Penalties	Total	Rank	Penalties	Total	Rank	Penalties	Rank	Penalties	Rank	Penalties	Rank
Chris Kappler	Royal Kaliber	Individual	4	=19	0	4	=5 Q	4	8	=5 Q	4	=4 Q	4	=2	8	2nd place, silver medalist(s)
Beezie Madden	Authentic	Individual	0	=1	0	0	1 Q	0	0	1 Q	12	=30	Did not advance			
McLain Ward	Sapphire	Individual	1	=11	8	9	=23 Q	8	17	=21 Q	8	=12 Q	Retired			
Peter Wylde	Fein Cera	Individual	0	=1	12	12	=28 Q	12	24	=37	Did not advance					
Chris Kappler; Beezie Madden; McLain Ward; Peter Wylde	See above	Team	—N/a								8	=1 Q	20	=2	28	1st place, gold medalist(s)

== Fencing ==
Men

Athlete	Event	Round of 64	Round of 32	Round of 16	Quarterfinal	Semifinal	Final / BM	
Athlete	Event	Opposition Score	Opposition Score	Opposition Score	Opposition Score	Opposition Score	Opposition Score	Rank
Weston Kelsey	Individual épée	Bye	Turchin (RUS); L 11–15	Did not advance				
Cody Mattern	Individual épée	Bye	Kovács (HUN); L 6–15	Did not advance				
Soren Thompson	Individual épée	Bye	Inostroza (CHI); W 13–12	Rota (ITA); W 15–13	Kolobkov (RUS); L 11–15	Did not advance		
Weston Kelsey; Cody Mattern; Soren Thompson; Jan Viviani	Team épée	—N/a			France; L 32–45	Classification semi-final China; W 45–36	5th place final Ukraine; L 33–45	6
Jedediah Dupree	Individual foil	El Azizi (ALG); L 12–13	Did not advance					
Dan Kellner	Individual foil	Bye	Gohy (BEL); W 15–12	Kruse (GBR); L 14–15	Did not advance			
Jonathan Tiomkin	Individual foil	Ben Aziza (TUN); W 15–10	Cassarà (ITA); L 15–10	Did not advance				
Jedediah Dupree; Dan Kellner; Jonathan Tiomkin	Team foil	—N/a			Germany; W 45–43	China; L 35–45	Russia; L 38–45	4
Ivan Lee	Individual sabre	Bye	Pastore (ITA); W 15–9	Pozdnyakov (RUS); L 9–15	Did not advance			
Jason Rogers	Individual sabre	Bye	Tarantino (ITA); L 3–15	Did not advance				
Keeth Smart	Individual sabre	Bye	Touya (FRA); W 15–11	Montano (ITA); L 7–15	Did not advance			
Ivan Lee; Jason Rogers; Keeth Smart	Team sabre	—N/a			Hungary; W 45–43	France; L 44–45	Russia; L 44–45	4

Women

Athlete	Event	Round of 64	Round of 32	Round of 16	Quarterfinal	Semifinal	Final / BM	
Athlete	Event	Opposition Score	Opposition Score	Opposition Score	Opposition Score	Opposition Score	Opposition Score	Rank
Kamara James	Individual épée	Bye	Logonova (RUS); L 11–15	Did not advance				
Erinn Smart	Individual foil	—N/a	González (VEN); L 12–14	Did not advance				
Emily Jacobson	Individual sabre	—N/a	Chow (HKG); W 15–11	Perrus (FRA); L 13–15	Did not advance			
Sada Jacobson	Individual sabre	—N/a	Bye	Faez (CUB); W 15–4	Perrus (FRA); W 15–11	Tan (CHN); L 12–15	Gheorghițoaia (ROM); W 15–7	3rd place, bronze medalist(s)
Mariel Zagunis	Individual sabre	—N/a	Bye	Hisage (JPN); W 15–13	Jemayeva (AZE); W 15–11	Gheorghițoaia (ROM); W 15–7	Tan (CHN); W 15–9	1st place, gold medalist(s)

== Football (soccer) ==
Summary

Team	Event	Group stage				Quarterfinal	Semifinal	Final / BM	
Team	Event	Opposition Score	Opposition Score	Opposition Score	Rank	Opposition Score	Opposition Score	Opposition Score	Rank
United States women	Women's tournament	Greece; W 3–0	Brazil; W 2–0	Australia; T 1–1	1 Q	Japan; W 2–1	Germany; W 2–1	Brazil; W 2–1	1st place, gold medalist(s)

=== Women's tournament ===
Roster
Head coach: April Heinrichs

The United States named a squad of 18 players and 4 alternates for the tournament.

No.	Pos.	Player	Date of birth (age)	Caps	Goals	Club
1	GK	Briana Scurry	7 September 1971 (aged 32)	120	0	(United States Soccer Federation) Atlanta Beat
2	DF	Heather Mitts	9 June 1978 (aged 26)	4	0	(United States Soccer Federation) Philadelphia Charge
3	DF	Christie Rampone	24 June 1975 (aged 29)	102	4	(United States Soccer Federation) New York Power
4	DF	Cat Reddick	10 February 1982 (aged 22)	36	1	(United States Soccer Federation) University of North Carolina
5	MF	Lindsay Tarpley	22 September 1983 (aged 20)	7	0	(United States Soccer Federation) University of North Carolina
6	DF	Brandi Chastain	21 July 1968 (aged 36)	171	30	(United States Soccer Federation) San Jose CyberRays
7	MF	Shannon Boxx	29 June 1977 (aged 27)	2	2	(United States Soccer Federation) New York Power
8	MF	Angela Hucles	5 July 1978 (aged 26)	24	1	(United States Soccer Federation) San Diego Spirit
9	FW	Mia Hamm	17 March 1972 (aged 32)	239	142	(United States Soccer Federation) Washington Freedom
10	MF	Aly Wagner	10 August 1980 (aged 24)	47	12	(United States Soccer Federation) Boston Breakers
11	MF	Julie Foudy (captain)	23 January 1971 (aged 33)	231	41	(United States Soccer Federation) San Jose CyberRays
12	FW	Cindy Parlow	8 May 1978 (aged 26)	128	62	(United States Soccer Federation) Atlanta Beat
13	MF	Kristine Lilly	22 July 1971 (aged 33)	255	91	(United States Soccer Federation) Boston Breakers
14	DF	Joy Fawcett	8 February 1968 (aged 36)	216	26	(United States Soccer Federation) San Diego Spirit
15	DF	Kate Markgraf	23 August 1976 (aged 27)	97	0	(United States Soccer Federation) Boston Breakers
16	FW	Abby Wambach	2 June 1980 (aged 24)	14	9	(United States Soccer Federation) Washington Freedom
17	FW	Heather O'Reilly	2 January 1985 (aged 19)	18	3	(United States Soccer Federation) University of North Carolina
18	GK	Kristin Luckenbill	28 May 1979 (aged 25)	0	0	(United States Soccer Federation) Carolina Courage

Group play

Pos	Team	Pld	W	D	L	GF	GA	GD	Pts	Qualification
1	United States	3	2	1	0	6	1	+5	7	Qualified for the quarterfinals
2	Brazil	3	2	0	1	8	2	+6	6	Qualified for the quarterfinals
3	Australia	3	1	1	1	2	2	0	4	Qualified for the quarterfinals
4	Greece	3	0	0	3	0	11	−11	0	

11 August 2004
18:00

Greece	0–3	United States
	Report	Boxx 14'; Wambach 30'; Hamm 82'

Pankritio Stadium, Heraklio
Attendance: 15.757
Referee: Palmqvist (Sweden)

14 August 2004
18:00

United States	2–0	Brazil
Hamm 58' (pen.); Wambach 77'	Report

Kaftanzoglio Stadium, Thessaloniki
Attendance: 17.123
Referee: Damkova (Czech Republic)

17 August 2004
18:00

United States	1–1	Australia
Lilly 19'	Report	Peters 82'

Kaftanzoglio Stadium, Thessaloniki
Attendance: 3.320
Referee: Ionescu (Romania)

Quarterfinal

20 August 2004
18:00

United States	2–1	Japan
Lilly 43'; Wambach 59'	Report	Yamamoto 48'

Kaftanzoglio Stadium, Thessaloniki
Attendance: 1.418
Referee: de Oliveira (Brazil)

Semifinal

23 August 2004
18:00

United States	2–1 (a.e.t.)	Germany
Lilly 33'; O'Reilly 99'	Report	Bachor 90+2'

Pankritio Stadium, Heraklio
Attendance: 5.165
Referee: Szokolai (Australia)

Gold medal match

26 August 2004
21:00

United States	2–1 (a.e.t.)	Brazil
Tarpley 39'; Wambach 112'	Report	Pretinha 73'

Karaiskakis Stadium, Piraeus
Attendance: 10,416
Referee: Jenny Palmqvist (Sweden) (Note: Palmqvist was replaced by Dianne Ferreira-James (Guyana) after 90 minutes due to dehydration.)

United States	Brazil

GK	1	Briana Scurry
CB	3	Christie Rampone
CB	5	Lindsay Tarpley		(substituted off) 91'
CB	6	Brandi Chastain		(substituted off) 61'
RWB	7	Shannon Boxx
DM	13	Kristine Lilly
CM	9	Mia Hamm
CM	11	Julie Foudy
LWB	14	Joy Fawcett
FW	15	Kate Markgraf
FW	16	Abby Wambach
Substitutes:
CB	4	Cat Whitehill	(substituted on) 61'
CB	14	Heather O'Reilly	(substituted on) 91'
Manager:
USA April Heinrichs

GK	1	Andréia
CB	3	Mônica	(yellow card) 47'
CB	4	Tânia Maranhão
CB	5	Juliana Cabral
RWB	16	Daniela Alves
DM	7	Formiga	(yellow card) 18'
CM	9	Pretinha
CM	10	Marta
LB	11	Rosana		(substituted off) 111'
LWB	12	Cristiane
FW	14	Elaine		(substituted off) 88'
Substitutes:
RW	6	Renata Costa	(substituted on) 88'
RB	15	Maycon	(substituted on) 111'
Manager:
(Brazil) Renê Simões

== Gymnastics ==
=== Artistic ===
Men
Team

Athlete	Event	Qualification								Final							
Athlete	Event	Apparatus						Total	Rank	Apparatus						Total	Rank
Athlete	Event	F	PH	R	V	PB	HB	Total	Rank	F	PH	R	V	PB	HB	Total	Rank
Jason Gatson	Team	—N/a	9.225	9.525	—N/a	9.712	9.337	—N/a		—N/a		9.125	—N/a	9.825	—N/a	—N/a	
Morgan Hamm	Team	9.725 Q	9.700	—N/a	9.500	—N/a	9.737 Q	—N/a		9.712	9.650	—N/a	9.637	—N/a	9.762	—N/a	
Paul Hamm	Team	9.725 Q	9.737 Q	9.512	9.575	9.762 Q	9.750 Q	58.061	1 Q	9.725	9.750	—N/a	9.612	9.737	9.462	—N/a	
Brett McClure	Team	9.437	9.000	9.037	9.512	9.675	9.662	56.323	19 Q	—N/a	9.650	—N/a			9.412	—N/a	
Blaine Wilson	Team	9.700	—N/a	9.625	9.512	9.687	8.862	—N/a		—N/a		9.637	—N/a	9.712	—N/a	—N/a	
Guard Young	Team	9.700	9.212	9.612	9.450	9.637	—N/a			9.700	—N/a	9.475	9.350	—N/a		—N/a	
Total	Team	38.850	37.874	38.274	38.099	38.836	38.486	230.419	2 Q	29.137	29.050	28.237	28.599	29.274	28.636	172.933	2nd place, silver medalist(s)

Individual finals

Athlete	Event	Apparatus						Total	Rank
Athlete	Event	F	PH	R	V	PB	HB	Total	Rank
Paul Hamm	All-around	9.725	9.700	9.587	9.137	9.837	9.837	57.823	1st place, gold medalist(s)
Brett McClure	All-around	9.412	9.712	9.162	9.625	9.725	9.612	57.248	9
Morgan Hamm	Floor	9.650	—N/a					9.650	8
Paul Hamm	Floor	9.712	—N/a					9.712	5
Paul Hamm	Pommel horse	—N/a	9.737	—N/a				9.737	6
Paul Hamm	Parallel bars	—N/a				9.737	—N/a	9.737	7
Morgan Hamm	Horizontal bar	—N/a					9.787	9.787	4
Paul Hamm	Horizontal bar	—N/a					9.812	9.812	2nd place, silver medalist(s)

Women
Team

Athlete	Event	Qualification						Final					
Athlete	Event	Apparatus				Total	Rank	Apparatus				Total	Rank
Athlete	Event	V	UB	BB	F	Total	Rank	V	UB	BB	F	Total	Rank
Mohini Bhardwaj	Team	9.337	9.487	9.350	9.525 Q	37.699	8*	9.500	—N/a	9.400	9.325	—N/a	
Annia Hatch	Team	9.387 Q	—N/a	—N/a				9.562	—N/a	—N/a		—N/a	
Terin Humphrey	Team	—N/a	9.625 Q	9.512	9.225	—N/a		—N/a	9.575	9.487	—N/a	—N/a	
Courtney Kupets	Team	9.350	9.637 Q	9.550 Q	9.400	37.937	4 Q	—N/a	9.662	—N/a	9.187	—N/a	
Courtney McCool	Team	9.350	9.575	9.112	9.250	37.287	13	—N/a				—N/a	
Carly Patterson	Team	9.512	9.600	9.725 Q	9.500	38.337	1 Q	9.325	9.287	9.612	9.662	—N/a	
Total	Team	37.599	38.437	38.137	37.675	151.848	2 Q	28.387	28.524	28.499	28.174	113.584	2nd place, silver medalist(s)

Individual finals

Athlete	Event	Apparatus				Total	Rank
Athlete	Event	V	UB	BB	F	Total	Rank
Courtney Kupets	All-around	9.275	9.625	8.975	9.237	37.112	9
Carly Patterson	All-around	9.375	9.575	9.725	9.712	38.387	1st place, gold medalist(s)
Annia Hatch	Vault	9.481	—N/a			9.481	2nd place, silver medalist(s)
Terin Humphrey	Uneven bars	—N/a	9.662	—N/a		9.662	2nd place, silver medalist(s)
Courtney Kupets	Uneven bars	—N/a	9.637	—N/a		9.637	3rd place, bronze medalist(s)
Courtney Kupets	Balance beam	—N/a		9.375	—N/a	9.375	5
Carly Patterson	Balance beam	—N/a		9.775	—N/a	9.775	2nd place, silver medalist(s)
Mohini Bhardwaj	Floor	—N/a			9.312	9.312	6

=== Rhythmic ===
Athlete	Event	Qualification						Final					
Athlete	Event	Hoop	Ball	Clubs	Ribbon	Total	Rank	Hoop	Ball	Clubs	Ribbon	Total	Rank
Mary Sanders	Individual	21.250	23.250	23.400	23.100	90.000	15	Did not advance					

=== Trampoline ===
Athlete	Event	Qualification		Final	
Athlete	Event	Score	Rank	Score	Rank
Jennifer Parilla	Women's	52.70	14	Did not advance	

== Judo ==
Twelve American judoka (seven male and five female) qualified for the 2004 Summer Olympics.

Men

Athlete	Event	Preliminary	Round of 32	Round of 16	Quarterfinals	Semifinals	Repechage 1	Repechage 2	Repechage 3	Final / BM	
Athlete	Event	Opposition Result	Opposition Result	Opposition Result	Opposition Result	Opposition Result	Opposition Result	Opposition Result	Opposition Result	Opposition Result	Rank
Taraje Williams-Murray	−60 kg	Bye	Yekutiel (ISR); W 1010–0000	Tsagaanbaatar (MGL); L 0000–1000	Did not advance		Shah (IND); L 0000–1100	Did not advance			
Alex Ottiano	−66 kg	—N/a	Dzhafarov (RUS); L 0001–0013	Did not advance							
Jimmy Pedro	−73 kg	Sadykov (KAZ); W 1001–0000	Lucenti (ARG); W 1012–0000	Lee (KOR); L 0010–1100	Did not advance		Laryukov (BLR); W 0001–0000	Bilodid (UKR); W 0100–0001	Neto (POR); W 1010–0000	Fernandes (FRA); W 1110–0001	3rd place, bronze medalist(s)
Rick Hawn	−81 kg	—N/a	Ibragimov (KGZ); W 0010–0001	Krawczyk (POL); L 0000–1000	Did not advance		Ben Saleh (LBA); W 1001–0000	Azizov (AZE); L 0000–1000	Did not advance		
Brian Olson	−90 kg	—N/a	Lama (CHI); W 0120–0001	Demontfaucon (FRA); L 0000–1000	Did not advance						
Rhadi Ferguson	−100 kg	Bye	Hasaba (SYR); W 1110–0001	Jang (KOR); L 0010–0011	Did not advance		Moussima (CMR); L 0001–0011	Did not advance			
Martin Boonzaayer	+100 kg	Bye	Al-Ali (KUW); W 1010–0000	Pepic (AUS); L 0000–1010	Did not advance						

Women

Athlete	Event	Round of 32	Round of 16	Quarterfinals	Semifinals	Repechage 1	Repechage 2	Repechage 3	Final / BM	
Athlete	Event	Opposition Result	Opposition Result	Opposition Result	Opposition Result	Opposition Result	Opposition Result	Opposition Result	Opposition Result	Rank
Charlee Minkin	−52 kg	Imbriani (GER); L 0000–0001	Did not advance							
Ellen Wilson	−57 kg	Bye	Gravenstijn (NED); L 0001–1011	Did not advance		Cavazzuti (ITA); L 0001–0011	Did not advance			
Ronda Rousey	−63 kg	Heill (AUT); L 0000–0010	Did not advance			Clark (GBR); W 1000–0001	Hong (PRK); L 0001–0010	Did not advance		
Celita Schutz	−70 kg	Ueno (JPN); L 0001–1000	Did not advance			Sraka (SLO); L 0000–0010	Did not advance			
Nicole Kubes	−78 kg	Massyagina (KAZ); W 1000–0000	Lebrun (FRA); L 0000–1011	Did not advance		Bye	Silva (BRA); L 0001–0200	Did not advance		

== Modern pentathlon ==
Four U.S. athletes qualified to compete in the modern pentathlon event through the 2003 Pan American Games in Santo Domingo, Dominican Republic.

Athlete	Event	Shooting (10 m air pistol)			Fencing (épée one touch)			Swimming (200 m freestyle)			Riding (show jumping)			Running (3000 m)			Total	
Athlete	Event	Points	Rank	MP Points	Results	Rank	MP points	Time	Rank	MP points	Penalties	Rank	MP points	Time	Rank	MP Points	Points	Rank
Vakhtang Iagorashvili	Men's	171	25	988	19–12	=2	916	2:09.11	18	1252	28	1	1172	10:13.95	27	948	5276	9
Chad Senior	Men's	175	18	1036	12–19	=26	720	2:02.39	4	1332	196	22	1004	9:35.76	2	1100	5192	13
Anita Allen	Women's	168	22	952	12–19	=26	720	2:31.16	29	1108	28	1	1172	11:09.00	10	1044	4996	18
Mary Beth Iagorashvili	Women's	152	32	760	16–15	=12	832	2:19.30	8	1252	56	4	1144	11:04.37	7	1064	5052	15

== Rowing ==
The U.S. rowers qualified the following boats:

Men

Athlete	Event	Heats		Repechage		Semifinals		Final	
Athlete	Event	Time	Rank	Time	Rank	Time	Rank	Time	Rank
Artour Samsonov; Luke Walton	Pair	7:11.81	3 SA/B	Bye		6:32.51	4 FB	6:30.49	11
Aquil Abdullah; Henry Nuzum	Double sculls	6:52.34	3 SA/B	Bye		6:14.69	3 FA	6:36.86	6
Greg Ruckman; Steve Tucker	Lightweight double sculls	6:20.00	2 R	6:19.35	2 SA/B	6:21.46	4 FB	6:45.20	7
Garrett Klugh; Wolfgang Moser; Jamie Schroeder; Michael Wherley	Four	6:30.01	4 R	5:58.13	2 SA/B	5:56.78	6 FB	5:52.55	10
Sloan DuRoss; Ben Holbrook; Kent Smack; Brett Wilkinson	Quadruple sculls	5:50.61	4 R	5:46.54	1 SA/B	5:46.65	5 FB	6:07.83	11
Matt Smith; Paul Teti; Pat Todd; Steve Warner	Lightweight four	5:54.68	3 SA/B	Bye		6:01.84	6 FB	6:22.24	9
Chris Ahrens; Wyatt Allen; Dan Beery; Peter Cipollone (C); Matt Deakin; Joseph Hansen; Beau Hoopman; Jason Read; Bryan Volpenhein	Eight	5:19.85 WR	1 FA	Bye		—N/a		5:42.48	1st place, gold medalist(s)

Women

Athlete	Event	Heats		Repechage		Semifinals		Final	
Athlete	Event	Time	Rank	Time	Rank	Time	Rank	Time	Rank
Jennifer Devine	Single sculls	7:55.15	2 R	7:35.91	2 SA/B/C	7:53.65	4 FB	7:33.69	9
Sarah Jones; Kate Mackenzie	Pair	7:53.78	5 R	7:15.95	4 FB	—N/a		7:13.71	9
Stacey Borgman; Lisa Schlenker	Lightweight double sculls	7:04.01	4 R	6:54.12	2 SA/B	6:54.16	4 FB	7:23.40	7
Hilary Gehman; Michelle Guerette; Danika Holbrook; Kelly Salchow	Quadruple sculls	6:18.63	2 R	6:25.39	4 FA	—N/a		6:39.67	5
Alison Cox; Caryn Davies; Megan Dirkmaat; Kate Johnson; Laurel Korholz; Samantha Magee; Anna Mickelson; Lianne Nelson; Mary Whipple (C)	Eight	5:56.55 WR	1 FA	Bye		—N/a		6:19.56	2nd place, silver medalist(s)

Qualification Legend: FA=Final A (medal); FB=Final B (non-medal); FC=Final C (non-medal); FD=Final D (non-medal); FE=Final E (non-medal); FF=Final F (non-medal); SA/B=Semifinals A/B; SC/D=Semifinals C/D; SE/F=Semifinals E/F; R=Repechage

== Sailing ==
U.S. sailors have qualified one boat for each of the following events.

Men

Athlete	Event	Race											Net points	Final rank
Athlete	Event	1	2	3	4	5	6	7	8	9	10	M*	Net points	Final rank
Peter Wells	Mistral	22	20	23	16	22	29	27	24	30	28	~~31~~	241	28
Kevin Hall	Finn	11	6	13	~~17~~	16	14	13	9	9	17	7	115	11
Kevin Burnham; Paul Foerster	470	1	8	2	15	9	4	3	7	18	4	~~22~~	71	1st place, gold medalist(s)
Paul Cayard; Phil Trinter	Star	1	6	15	10	3	6	1	15	6	8	~~16~~	71	5

Women

Athlete	Event	Race											Net points	Final rank
Athlete	Event	1	2	3	4	5	6	7	8	9	10	M*	Net points	Final rank
Lanee Beashel	Mistral	13	16	9	18	17	13	6	14	~~19~~	15	5	126	16
Meg Galliard	Europe	9	11	13	9	3	13	11	16	9	~~19~~	19	113	14
Isabelle Kinsolving; Katie McDowell	470	12	16	3	12	9	2	~~18~~	17	8	1	4	84	5
Carol Cronin; Liz Filter; Nancy Haberland	Yngling	2	10	16	9	15	10	1	15	7	1	~~OCS~~	86	10

Open

Athlete	Event	Race																Net points	Final rank
Athlete	Event	1	2	3	4	5	6	7	8	9	10	11	12	13	14	15	M*	Net points	Final rank
Mark Mendelblatt	Laser	2	14	20	6	6	10	~~29~~	22	16	6	—N/a					9	115	8
Pete Spaulding; Tim Wadlow	49er	7	8	5	~~OCS~~	9	9	8	3	1	13	7	3	10	11	1	10	92	5
John Lovell; Charlie Ogletree	Tornado	2	2	1	6	9	9	6	7	1	2	—N/a					~~10~~	45	2nd place, silver medalist(s)

M = Medal race; OCS = On course side of the starting line; DSQ = Disqualified; DNF = Did not finish; DNS= Did not start; RDG = Redress given

== Shooting ==
Twenty-one U.S. shooters (twelve men and nine women) qualified to compete in the following events:

Men

Athlete	Event	Qualification		Final	
Athlete	Event	Points	Rank	Points	Rank
Matt Emmons	10 m air rifle	594	=9	Did not advance	
Jason Parker	10 m air rifle	594	7 Q	694.5	8
Michael Anti	50 m rifle prone	591	=24	Did not advance	
Matt Emmons	50 m rifle prone	599	1 Q	703.3	1st place, gold medalist(s)
Michael Anti	50 m rifle 3 positions	1165	7 Q	1263.1	2nd place, silver medalist(s)
Matt Emmons	50 m rifle 3 positions	1169	2 Q	1257.4	8
Daryl Szarenski	10 m air pistol	579	=13	Did not advance	
Jason Turner	10 m air pistol	571	=36	Did not advance	
Daryl Szarenski	50 m pistol	554	=15	Did not advance	
Jason Turner	50 m pistol	553	=18	Did not advance	
Lance Bade	Trap	122	2 Q	143	5
Bret Erickson	Trap	118	13	Did not advance	
Walton Eller	Double trap	127	=17	Did not advance	
Bret Erickson	Double trap	130	=13	Did not advance	
Shawn Dulohery	Skeet	122	3 Q	147	5
James Graves	Skeet	121	=9	Did not advance	
Koby Holland	10 m running target	551	18	Did not advance	
Adam Saathoff	10 m running target	575	8	Did not advance	

Women

Athlete	Event	Qualification		Final	
Athlete	Event	Points	Rank	Points	Rank
Emily Caruso	10 m air rifle	396	=9	Did not advance	
Hattie Johnson	10 m air rifle	394	=14	Did not advance	
Sarah Blakeslee	50 m rifle 3 positions	571	=20	Did not advance	
Morgan Hicks	50 m rifle 3 positions	577	12	Did not advance	
Elizabeth Callahan	10 m air pistol	374	=30	Did not advance	
Rebecca Snyder	10 m air pistol	380	=16	Did not advance	
Elizabeth Callahan	25 m pistol	575	=19	Did not advance	
Rebecca Snyder	25 m pistol	574	=21	Did not advance	
Whitly Loper	Trap	62	4 Q	82	4
Kimberly Rhode	Double trap	110	1 Q	146	1st place, gold medalist(s)
Kimberly Rhode	Skeet	68	6 Q	91	5
Connie Smotek	Skeet	68	5 Q	90	6

== Softball ==
Summary

Team	Event	Group stage								Semifinal	Bronze medal game	Final	
Team	Event	Opposition Score	Opposition Score	Opposition Score	Opposition Score	Opposition Score	Opposition Score	Opposition Score	Rank	Opposition Score	Opposition Score	Opposition Score	Rank
United States women	Women's tournament	Italy; W 7–0	Australia; W 10–0	Japan; W 3–0	China; W 4–0	Canada; W 7–0	Greece; W 7–0	Chinese Taipei; W 3–0	1 Q	Australia; W 5–0	Bye	Australia; W 3–0	1st place, gold medalist(s)

Squad

United States Softball Olympic Team roster
Players		Coaches
Pitchers: 8 Cat Osterman; 16 Lisa Fernandez; 21 Lori Harrigan; 27 Jennie Finch	Catchers: 31 Jenny Topping; 33 Stacey Nuveman; Infielders: 3 Lovieanne Jung; 6 Crystl Bustos; 20 Leah Amico; 29 Natasha Watley; Outfielders: 2 Jessica Mendoza; 12 Kelly Kretschman; 44 Laura Berg	Manager: Mike Candrea; Coaches: Ken Eriksen (asst.); John Rittman (asst.)

Group Stage
All times are Eastern European Time (UTC+2)

Qualified for the semifinals
Eliminated

Team	W	L	RS	RA	WIN%	Tiebreaker
United States	7	0	41	0	1.000	-
Australia	6	1	22	14	.857	-
Japan	4	3	17	8	.571	-
China	3	4	15	20	.429	1–0
Canada	3	4	6	14	.429	0–1
Chinese Taipei	2	5	3	13	.286	1–0
Greece	2	5	6	24	.286	0–1
Italy	1	6	8	24	.143	-

August 14 12:00 at Helliniko Softball Stadium
Team	1	2	3	4	5	R	H	E
Italy	0	0	0	0	0	0	5	0
United States	1	3	0	0	3	7	8	0
WP: Jennie Finch(1–0) LP: Leslie Malerich(0–1); Notes: Game ended by mercy rule

August 15 17:00 at Helliniko Softball Stadium
Team	1	2	3	4	5	R	H	E
Australia	0	0	0	0	0	0	1	0
United States	2	0	0	8	X	10	9	2
WP: Lisa Fernandez(1–0) LP: Brooke Wilkins(0–1); Notes: Game ended by mercy rule

August 16 12:20 at Helliniko Softball Stadium
Team	1	2	3	4	5	6	7	8	R	H	E
United States	0	0	0	0	1	0	0	3	3	3	0
Japan	2	0	0	0	0	0	0	0	0	1	3
WP: Cat Osterman(1–0) LP: Juri Takayama(0–1)

August 17 9:30 at Helliniko Softball Stadium
Team	1	2	3	4	5	6	7	R	H	E
China	0	0	0	0	0	0	2	0	1	1
United States	2	1	0	0	1	0	X	4	5	1
WP: Lori Harrigan(1–0) LP: Zhang Lixia(1–1); Home runs: CHN: None; USA: Crystl Bustos in 5th, 1 RBI

August 18 17:00 at Helliniko Softball Stadium
Team	1	2	3	4	5	R	H	E
Canada	0	3	1	0	0	0	1	1
United States	1	2	1	2	1	7	11	1
WP: Jennie Finch(2–0) LP: Auburn Sigurdson(0–1); Home runs: CAN: None; USA: Crystl Bustos in 4th, 1 RBI; Lisa Fernandez in 4th, 1 RBI; Notes: Game ended by mercy rule

August 19 12:00 at Helliniko Softball Stadium
Team	1	2	3	4	5	R	H	E
Greece	0	0	0	0	0	0	1	1
United States	0	0	1	3	3	7	9	0
WP: Lisa Fernandez(2–0) LP: Stephanie Skegas-Maxwell(0–1); Notes: Game ended by Run Ahead Rule

August 20 12:00 at Helliniko Softball Stadium
Team	1	2	3	4	5	6	7	R	H	E
Chinese Taipei	0	0	0	0	0	0	0	0	3	0
United States	0	0	1	1	1	1	X	3	8	1
WP: Cat Osterman(2–0) LP: Wu Chia-Yen(0–3); Home runs: TPE: None; USA: Crystl Bustos in 4th, 1 RBI

Semifinal

August 22 12:20 at Helliniko Softball Stadium
Team	1	2	3	4	5	6	7	R	H	E
Australia	0	0	0	0	0	0	0	0	3	0
United States	0	0	0	1	3	1	X	5	8	0
WP: Lisa Fernandez(3–0) LP: Melanie Roche(3–1); Home runs: AUS: None; USA: Kelly Kretschman in 6th, 1 RBI

Gold medal game

August 23 16:00 at Helliniko Softball Stadium
Team	1	2	3	4	5	6	7	R	H	E
Australia (silver)	0	0	0	0	0	1	0	1	4	1
United States (gold)	3	0	2	1	3	0	X	5	9	0
WP: Lisa Fernandez(4–0) LP: Tanya Harding(4–1); Home runs: AUS: None; USA: Crystl Bustos in 1st, 2 RBI;Crystl Bustos in 3rd, 1 RBI;Stacey Nuveman in 3rd, 1 RBI

== Swimming ==
U.S. swimmers earned qualifying standards in the following events (up to a maximum of 2 swimmers in each event at the A-standard time, and 1 at the B-standard time): Swimmers qualified at the 2004 U.S. Olympic Trials (for pool events).

Men

Athlete	Event	Heat		Semifinal		Final	
Athlete	Event	Time	Rank	Time	Rank	Time	Rank
Gary Hall Jr.	50 m freestyle	22.04	1 Q	22.18	5 Q	21.93	1st place, gold medalist(s)
Jason Lezak	50 m freestyle	22.33	7 Q	22.12	3 Q	22.11	5
Ian Crocker	100 m freestyle	49.73	=17	Did not advance			
Jason Lezak	100 m freestyle	49.73	21	Did not advance			
Klete Keller	200 m freestyle	1:47.97	4 Q	1:47.28	4 Q	1:46.13	4
Michael Phelps	200 m freestyle	1:48.43	5 Q	1:47.08	3 Q	1:45.32 AM	3rd place, bronze medalist(s)
Klete Keller	400 m freestyle	3:47.77	5 Q	—N/a		3:44.11 AM	3rd place, bronze medalist(s)
Larsen Jensen	400 m freestyle	3:46.90	3 Q	—N/a		3:46.08	4
Larsen Jensen	1500 m freestyle	15:03.75	4 Q	—N/a		14:45.29 NR	2nd place, silver medalist(s)
Erik Vendt	1500 m freestyle	15:22.00	16	—N/a		Did not advance	
Lenny Krayzelburg	100 m backstroke	54.87	4 Q	54.63	4 Q	54.38	4
Aaron Peirsol	100 m backstroke	54.65	2 Q	54.34	1 Q	54.06	1st place, gold medalist(s)
Bryce Hunt	200 m backstroke	1:59.82	7 Q	1:59.74	10	Did not advance	
Aaron Peirsol	200 m backstroke	1:57.33	1 Q	1:55.14 OR	1 Q	1:54.95 OR	1st place, gold medalist(s)
Mark Gangloff	100 m breaststroke	1:00.81	3 Q	1:01.07	=4 Q	1:01.17	4
Brendan Hansen	100 m breaststroke	1:00.25	2 Q	1:00.01 OR	1 Q	1:00.25	2nd place, silver medalist(s)
Brendan Hansen	200 m breaststroke	2:12.77	5 Q	2:10.81	2 Q	2:10.87	3rd place, bronze medalist(s)
Scott Usher	200 m breaststroke	2:13.59	9 Q	2:12.00	5 Q	2:11.95	7
Ian Crocker	100 m butterfly	52.03	1 Q	51.83	3 Q	51.29	2nd place, silver medalist(s)
Michael Phelps	100 m butterfly	52.35	3 Q	51.61 OR	1 Q	51.25 OR	1st place, gold medalist(s)
Tom Malchow	200 m butterfly	1:57.75	4 Q	1:57.48	8 Q	1:57.48	8
Michael Phelps	200 m butterfly	1:57.36	=1 Q	1:55.65	2 Q	1:54.04 OR	1st place, gold medalist(s)
Ryan Lochte	200 m individual medley	2:01.41	10 Q	1:59.58	2 Q	1:58.78	2nd place, silver medalist(s)
Michael Phelps	200 m individual medley	2:00.01	2 Q	1:58.52 OR	1 Q	1:57.14 OR	1st place, gold medalist(s)
Michael Phelps	400 m individual medley	4:13.29	1 Q	—N/a		4:08.26 WR	1st place, gold medalist(s)
Erik Vendt	400 m individual medley	4:16.68	6 Q	—N/a		4:11.81	2nd place, silver medalist(s)
Ian Crocker; Nate Dusing^{[c]} Gary Hall Jr.^{[c]} Jason Lezak; Michael Phelps; Neil Walker; Gabe Woodward^{[c]}	4 × 100 m freestyle relay	3:15.83	2 Q	—N/a		3:14.62	3rd place, bronze medalist(s)
Scott Goldblatt^{[c]} Klete Keller; Dan Ketchum^{[c]} Ryan Lochte; Michael Phelps; Peter Vanderkaay	4 × 200 m freestyle relay	7:12.80	1 Q	—N/a		7:07.33 AM	1st place, gold medalist(s)
Ian Crocker; Mark Gangloff^{[c]} Brendan Hansen; Lenny Krayzelburg^{[c]} Jason Lezak; Aaron Peirsol; Michael Phelps^{[c]} Neil Walker^{[c]}	4 × 100 m medley relay	3:35.10	1 Q	—N/a		3:30.68 WR	1st place, gold medalist(s)

Women

Athlete	Event	Heat		Semifinal		Final	
Athlete	Event	Time	Rank	Time	Rank	Time	Rank
Kara Lynn Joyce	50 m freestyle	25.06	2 Q	25.06	4 Q	25.00	5
Jenny Thompson	50 m freestyle	25.50	11 Q	25.17	=7 Q	25.11	7
Natalie Coughlin	100 m freestyle	54.82	3 Q	54.37	3 Q	54.40	3rd place, bronze medalist(s)
Kara Lynn Joyce	100 m freestyle	54.53	2 Q	54.81	5 Q	54.54	5
Lindsay Benko	200 m freestyle	2:00.21	8 Q	2:00.22	14	Did not advance	
Dana Vollmer	200 m freestyle	1:59.49	1 Q	1:59.04	4 Q	1:58.98	6
Kalyn Keller	400 m freestyle	4:09.83	10	—N/a		Did not advance	
Kaitlin Sandeno	400 m freestyle	4:08.22	6 Q	—N/a		4:06.19	3rd place, bronze medalist(s)
Kalyn Keller	800 m freestyle	8:32.36	6 Q	—N/a		8:26.97	4
Diana Munz	800 m freestyle	8:30.87	4 Q	—N/a		8:26.61	3rd place, bronze medalist(s)
Haley Cope	100 m backstroke	1:01.99	11 Q	1:01.13	5 Q	1:01.76	8
Natalie Coughlin	100 m backstroke	1:01.45	3 Q	1:00.17 OR	1 Q	1:00.37	1st place, gold medalist(s)
Kristen Caverly	200 m backstroke	2:15.34	17	Did not advance			
Margaret Hoelzer	200 m backstroke	2:12.55	4 Q	2:11.68	5 Q	2:10.70	5
Amanda Beard	100 m breaststroke	1:08.04	5 Q	1:07.92	5 Q	1:07.44	4
Tara Kirk	100 m breaststroke	1:07.92	3 Q	1:07.60	3 Q	1:07.59	6
Amanda Beard	200 m breaststroke	2:26.61	3 Q	2:25.62	1 Q	2:23.37 OR	1st place, gold medalist(s)
Caroline Bruce	200 m breaststroke	2:27.82	8 Q	2:27.60	9	Did not advance	
Rachel Komisarz	100 m butterfly	59.38	=8 Q	59.34	11	Did not advance	
Jenny Thompson	100 m butterfly	58.77	6 Q	58.91	6 Q	58.72	5
Dana Kirk	200 m butterfly	2:11.96	12 Q	2:10.69	9	Did not advance	
Kaitlin Sandeno	200 m butterfly	2:10.50	4 Q	2:08.77	1 Q	2:08.18	4
Amanda Beard	200 m individual medley	2:14.49	4 Q	2:13.51	2 Q	2:11.70 AM	2nd place, silver medalist(s)
Katie Hoff	200 m individual medley	2:14.03	3 Q	2:13.60	3 Q	2:13.97	7
Katie Hoff	400 m individual medley	4:47.49	17	—N/a		Did not advance	
Kaitlin Sandeno	400 m individual medley	4:40.21	2 Q	—N/a		4:34.95 AM	2nd place, silver medalist(s)
Lindsay Benko; Maritza Correia^{[c]} Natalie Coughlin; Kara Lynn Joyce; Colleen Lanne^{[c]} Jenny Thompson; Amanda Weir^{[c]}	4 × 100 m freestyle relay	3:39.46	2 Q	—N/a		3:36.39 AM	2nd place, silver medalist(s)
Lindsay Benko; Natalie Coughlin; Rhi Jeffrey^{[c]} Rachel Komisarz^{[c]} Carly Piper^{[c]} Kaitlin Sandeno; Dana Vollmer	4 × 200 m freestyle relay	8:00.81	1 Q	—N/a		7:53.42 WR	1st place, gold medalist(s)
Amanda Beard; Haley Cope^{[c]} Natalie Coughlin^{[c]} Kara Lynn Joyce; Tara Kirk^{[c]} Rachel Komisarz^{[c]} Jenny Thompson; Amanda Weir	4 × 100 m medley relay	4:02.82	1 Q	—N/a		3:59.12	2nd place, silver medalist(s)

^{c} - Swimmer competed in the heats only.

== Synchronized swimming ==
Nine U.S. synchronized swimmers qualified a spot in the women's team.

Athlete	Event	Technical routine		Free routine (preliminary)			Free routine (final)		
Athlete	Event	Points	Rank	Points	Total (technical + free)	Rank	Points	Total (technical + free)	Rank
Alison Bartosik; Anna Kozlova	Duet	48.334	3	48.417	96.751	3 Q	48.584	96.918	3rd place, bronze medalist(s)
Alison Bartosik; Tamara Crow; Erin Dobratz; Rebecca Jasontek; Anna Kozlova; Sara Lowe; Lauren McFall; Stephanie Nesbitt; Kendra Zanotto	Team	48.584	3	—N/a			48.834	97.418	3rd place, bronze medalist(s)

== Table tennis ==
Seven U.S. table tennis players qualified for the following events. Ilija Lupulesku and Jasna Fazlić previously competed for Yugoslavia since the sport made its debut at the 1988 Summer Olympics.

Men

Athlete	Event	Round 1	Round 2	Round 3	Round 4	Quarterfinals	Semifinals	Final / BM	
Athlete	Event	Opposition Result	Opposition Result	Opposition Result	Opposition Result	Opposition Result	Opposition Result	Opposition Result	Rank
Ilija Lupulesku	Singles	Papic (CHI); W 4–0	Crişan (ROM); L 0–4	Did not advance					
Khoa Nguyen	Singles	Henzell (AUS); L 1–4	Did not advance						
Mark Hazinski; Ilija Lupulesku	Doubles	—N/a	Merotohun / Toriola (NGR); W 4–0	Chiang / Chuang (TPE); L 2–4	Did not advance				

Women

Athlete	Event	Round 1	Round 2	Round 3	Round 4	Quarterfinals	Semifinals	Final / BM	
Athlete	Event	Opposition Result	Opposition Result	Opposition Result	Opposition Result	Opposition Result	Opposition Result	Opposition Result	Rank
Tawny Banh	Singles	Yoon (KOR); W 4–3	Li (NZL); L 1–4	Did not advance					
Jasna Fazlić	Singles	Štrbíková (CZE); W 4–2	Zhang (SIN); L 1–4	Did not advance					
Gao Jun	Singles	Bye		Fukuhara (JPN); L 0–4	Did not advance				
Tawny Banh; Gao Jun	Doubles	Bye	Perez / Ramos (VEN); W 4–0	Kim B-K / Kim K-A (KOR); L 0–4	Did not advance				
Jasna Fazlić; Whitney Ping	Doubles	Bye	Tan / Zhang (SIN); L 0–4	Did not advance					

== Taekwondo ==
Two U.S. taekwondo jin qualified to compete.

Athlete	Event	Round of 16	Quarterfinals	Semifinals	Repechage 1	Repechage 2	Final / BM	
Athlete	Event	Opposition Result	Opposition Result	Opposition Result	Opposition Result	Opposition Result	Opposition Result	Rank
Steven López	Men's −80 kg	Rasheed (IRQ); W 12–0	Estrada (MEX); W 4–2	Karami (IRI); W 7–6	Bye		Tanrıkulu (TUR); W 3–0	1st place, gold medalist(s)
Nia Abdallah	Women's −57 kg	Mkrtchyan (RUS); W 16–9	Corsi (ITA); W 3–2	Sukkhongdumnoen (THA); W 7–7 SUP	Bye		Jang (KOR); L 1–2	2nd place, silver medalist(s)

== Tennis ==
The United States Tennis Association nominated six male and six female tennis players to compete in the tennis tournament.

Men

Athlete	Event	Round of 64	Round of 32	Round of 16	Quarterfinals	Semifinals	Final / BM	
Athlete	Event	Opposition Score	Opposition Score	Opposition Score	Opposition Score	Opposition Score	Opposition Score	Rank
Taylor Dent	Singles	Niemeyer (CAN); W 6–2, 3–6, 6–4	Hrbatý (SVK); W 7–6^{(7–4)}, 6–3	Ljubičić (CRO); W 6–4, 6–4	Berdych (CZE); W 6–4, 6–1	Massú (CHI); L 6–7^{(5–7)}, 1–6	González (CHI); L 4–6, 6–2, 14–16	4
Mardy Fish	Singles	Björkman (SWE); W 7–6^{(9–7)}, 1–0 RET	Ferrero (ESP); W 4–6, 7–6^{(7–5)}, 6–4	Mirnyi (BLR); W 6–4, 4–6, 6–1	Youzhny (RUS); W 6–3, 6–4	González (CHI); W 3–6, 6–3, 6–4	Massú (CHI); L 3–6, 6–3, 6–2, 3–6, 4–6	2nd place, silver medalist(s)
Andy Roddick	Singles	Saretta (BRA); W 6–3, 7–6^{(7–4)}	Haas (GER); W 4–6, 6–3, 9–7	González (CHI); L 4–6, 4–6	Did not advance			
Vince Spadea	Singles	Melzer (AUT); W 6–0, 6–1	Massú (CHI); L 6–7^{(3–7)}, 2–6	Did not advance				
Bob Bryan; Mike Bryan	Doubles	—N/a	Safin / Youzhny (RUS); W 6–1, 6–2	Mirnyi / Voltchkov (BLR); W 6–3, 6–3	González / Massú (CHI); L 5–7, 4–6	Did not advance		
Mardy Fish; Andy Roddick	Doubles	—N/a	Bhupathi / Paes (IND); L 6–7^{(5–7)}, 3–6	Did not advance				

Women

Athlete	Event	Round of 64	Round of 32	Round of 16	Quarterfinals	Semifinals	Final / BM	
Athlete	Event	Opposition Score	Opposition Score	Opposition Score	Opposition Score	Opposition Score	Opposition Score	Rank
Lisa Raymond	Singles	Kurhajcová (CZE); W 6–4, 4–6, 6–3	Elia (ITA); W 6–1, 6–2	Molik (AUS); L 4–6, 4–6	Did not advance			
Chanda Rubin	Singles	Stosur (AUS); W 6–2, 6–7^{(8–10)}, 6–0	Black (ZIM); W 6–4, 3–6, 6–3	Mauresmo (FRA); L 3–6, 1–6	Did not advance			
Venus Williams	Singles	Czink (HUN); W 6–1, 6–2	Matevžič (SLO); W 6–0, 6–0	Pierce (FRA); L 4–6, 4–6	Did not advance			
Martina Navratilova; Lisa Raymond	Doubles	—N/a	Beygelzimer / Perebiynis (UKR); W 6–0, 6–2	Mauresmo / Pierce (FRA); W RET	Asagoe / Sugiyama (JPN); W 4–6, 6–4, 4–6	Did not advance		
Chanda Rubin; Venus Williams	Doubles	—N/a	Li / Sun (CHN); L 5–7, 6–1, 3–6	Did not advance				

== Triathlon ==
Six U.S. triathletes qualified for the following events.

Athlete	Event	Swim (1.5 km)	Trans 1	Bike (40 km)	Trans 2	Run (10 km)	Total Time	Rank
Hunter Kemper	Men's	18:11	0:18	1:02:23	0:22	31:30	1:52:46.33	9
Victor Plata	Men's	18:16	0:18	1:05:23	0:23	32:49	1:57:09.09	27
Andy Potts	Men's	17:49	0:18	1:02:47	0:22	34:20	1:55:36.47	22
Barbara Lindquist	Women's	18:39	0:21	1:08:59	0:22	38:04	2:06:25.49	9
Sheila Taormina	Women's	18:37	0:20	1:09:03	0:20	41:01	2:09:21.08	23
Susan Williams	Women's	19:02	0:17	1:08:41	0:27	36:41	2:05:08.92	3rd place, bronze medalist(s)

== Volleyball ==
=== Beach ===
Athlete	Event	Preliminary round				Round of 16	Quarterfinal	Semifinal	Final / BM	
Athlete	Event	Opposition Score	Opposition Score	Opposition Score	Rank	Opposition Score	Opposition Score	Opposition Score	Opposition Score	Rank
Dain Blanton; Jeff Nygaard	Men's	Prosser – Williams (AUS); L 0–2	Child – Heese (CAN); L 0–2	Heuscher – Kobel (SUI); L 1–2	4	Did not advance				
Dax Holdren; Stein Metzger	Men's	Schacht – Slack (AUS); W 2–1	Horrem – Maaseide (NOR); L 1–2	Rego – Santos (BRA); L 0–2	3 Q	Dieckmann – Reckermann (GER); W 2–1	Heuscher – Kobel (SUI); L 0–2	Did not advance		
Misty May; Kerri Walsh	Women's	Kusuhara – Tokuno (JPN); W 2–0	Kadijk – Leenstra (NED); W 2–0	Celbová – Nováková (CZE); W 2–0	1 Q	Tian – Wang F (CHN); W 2–0	Dumont – Martin (CAN); W 2–0	McPeak – Youngs (USA); W 2–0	Bede – Behar (BRA); W 2–0	1st place, gold medalist(s)
Holly McPeak; Elaine Youngs	Women's	Glesnes – Maaseide (NOR); W 2–0	Dumont – Martin (CAN); W 2–1	Kuhn – Schnyder (SUI); W 2–1	1 Q	Celbová – Nováková (CZE); W 2–0	Pohl – Rau (GER); W 2–0	May – Walsh (USA); L 0–2	Bronze medal final Cook – Sanderson (AUS); W 2–1	3rd place, bronze medalist(s)

=== Indoor ===
Summary

Team	Event	Group stage						Quarterfinal	Semifinal	Final / BM	
Team	Event	Opposition Score	Opposition Score	Opposition Score	Opposition Score	Opposition Score	Rank	Opposition Score	Opposition Score	Opposition Score	Rank
United States men	Men's tournament	Italy; L 1–3	Netherlands; W 3–0	Russia; L 1–3	Australia; W 3–1	Brazil; W 3–1	3 Q	Greece; W 3–2	Brazil; L 0–3	Bronze medal final Russia; L 0–3	4
United States women	Women's tournament	China; L 1–3	Germany; W 3–1	Dominican Republic; L 2–3	Russia; L 2–3	Cuba; W 3–0	4 Q	Brazil; L 2–3	Did not advance		=5

==== Men's tournament ====
Roster
The following is the American roster in the men's volleyball tournament of the 2004 Summer Olympics.

Head coach: Doug Beal

№	Name	Date of birth	Height	Weight	Spike	Block	2004 club
1	Lloy Ball (c)	17 February 1972	2.03 m (6 ft 8 in)	99 kg (218 lb)	351 cm (138 in)	316 cm (124 in)	(Italy) Daytona Modena
5	Erik Sullivan (L)	9 August 1972	1.93 m (6 ft 4 in)	88 kg (194 lb)	340 cm (130 in)	320 cm (130 in)	(Russia) Iskra Odintsovo
6	Phillip Eatherton	2 January 1974	2.05 m (6 ft 9 in)	97 kg (214 lb)	356 cm (140 in)	335 cm (132 in)	(Spain) Numancia Soria
7	Donald Suxho	21 February 1976	1.95 m (6 ft 5 in)	99 kg (218 lb)	337 cm (133 in)	319 cm (126 in)	(Turkey) Erdemirspor
8	William Priddy	1 October 1977	1.93 m (6 ft 4 in)	88 kg (194 lb)	353 cm (139 in)	330 cm (130 in)	Unattached
9	Ryan Millar	22 January 1978	2.03 m (6 ft 8 in)	99 kg (218 lb)	354 cm (139 in)	326 cm (128 in)	(Italy) Gabeca Bossini Montichiari
10	Riley Salmon	2 July 1976	1.90 m (6 ft 3 in)	86 kg (190 lb)	345 cm (136 in)	331 cm (130 in)	(Russia) Iskra Odintsovo
11	Brook Billings	30 April 1980	1.98 m (6 ft 6 in)	95 kg (209 lb)	351 cm (138 in)	331 cm (130 in)	(Japan) Sakai Blazers
12	Tom Hoff	9 June 1973	2.03 m (6 ft 8 in)	99 kg (218 lb)	353 cm (139 in)	333 cm (131 in)	(Greece) Iraklis Thessaloniki
13	Clay Stanley	20 January 1978	2.05 m (6 ft 9 in)	106 kg (234 lb)	357 cm (141 in)	332 cm (131 in)	(Greece) Panathinaikos
14	Kevin Barnett	14 May 1974	1.98 m (6 ft 6 in)	95 kg (209 lb)	353 cm (139 in)	340 cm (130 in)	Unattached
15	Gabriel Gardner	18 March 1976	2.05 m (6 ft 9 in)	99 kg (218 lb)	353 cm (139 in)	335 cm (132 in)	(Brazil) União Suzano

Group play

Pos	Team	Pld	W	L	Pts	SW	SL	SR	SPW	SPL	SPR	Qualification
1	Brazil	5	4	1	9	13	7	1.857	483	431	1.121	Quarterfinals
2	Italy	5	3	2	8	13	7	1.857	465	434	1.071	Quarterfinals
3	United States	5	3	2	8	11	8	1.375	437	423	1.033	Quarterfinals
4	Russia	5	3	2	8	11	9	1.222	452	430	1.051	Quarterfinals
5	Netherlands	5	2	3	7	7	11	0.636	391	419	0.933	
6	Australia	5	0	5	5	2	15	0.133	331	422	0.784	

Source: FIVB

15 August 2004; 21:30	Italy	3–1	United States	Peace and Friendship Stadium; Attendance: 5,630; Referees: Kun-Tae Kim (KOR), Juan Pereyra (ARG)
15 August 2004; 21:30	(25–21, 21–25, 25–17, 25–23) result			Peace and Friendship Stadium; Attendance: 5,630; Referees: Kun-Tae Kim (KOR), Juan Pereyra (ARG)

17 August 2004; 16:00	United States	3–0	Netherlands	Peace and Friendship Stadium; Attendance: 3,000; Referees: Juan Pereyra (ARG), Abdullah Al-Khelaifi (KSA)
17 August 2004; 16:00	(26–24, 25–20, 25–18) result			Peace and Friendship Stadium; Attendance: 3,000; Referees: Juan Pereyra (ARG), Abdullah Al-Khelaifi (KSA)

19 August 2004; 21:45	Russia	3–1	United States	Peace and Friendship Stadium; Attendance: 4,930; Referees: Hiroyuki Ito (JPN), Ning Wang (CHN)
19 August 2004; 21:45	(22–25, 25–20, 25–16, 25–23) result			Peace and Friendship Stadium; Attendance: 4,930; Referees: Hiroyuki Ito (JPN), Ning Wang (CHN)

21 August 2004; 09:00	Australia	1–3	United States	Peace and Friendship Stadium; Attendance: 4,580; Referees: Fotios Lekkas (GRE), Ryszard Dietrich (POL)
21 August 2004; 09:00	(19–25, 25–23, 13–25, 19–25) result			Peace and Friendship Stadium; Attendance: 4,580; Referees: Fotios Lekkas (GRE), Ryszard Dietrich (POL)

23 August 2004; 22:20	United States	3–1	Brazil	Peace and Friendship Stadium; Attendance: 3,150; Referees: Bela Hobor (HUN), Dejan Jovanovic (SCG)
23 August 2004; 22:20	(25–22, 25–23, 18–25, 25–22) result			Peace and Friendship Stadium; Attendance: 3,150; Referees: Bela Hobor (HUN), Dejan Jovanovic (SCG)

Quarterfinal

25 August 2004; 19:30	Greece	2–3	United States	Peace and Friendship Stadium; Attendance: 9,300; Referees: Kun-Tae Kim (KOR), Juan Pereyra (ARG)
25 August 2004; 19:30	(20–25, 25–22, 27–25, 23–25, 15–17) result			Peace and Friendship Stadium; Attendance: 9,300; Referees: Kun-Tae Kim (KOR), Juan Pereyra (ARG)

Semifinals

27 August 2004; 21:30	United States	0–3	Brazil	Peace and Friendship Stadium; Attendance: 9,380; Referees: Umit Sokullu (TUR), Ryszard Dietrich (POL)
27 August 2004; 21:30	(16–25, 17–25, 23–25) result			Peace and Friendship Stadium; Attendance: 9,380; Referees: Umit Sokullu (TUR), Ryszard Dietrich (POL)

Bronze medal match

29 August 2004; 12:30	Russia	3–0	United States	Peace and Friendship Stadium; Attendance: 7,650; Referees: Kun-Tae Kim (KOR), Valdir Dellaqua (BRA)
29 August 2004; 12:30	(25–22, 27–25, 25–16) result			Peace and Friendship Stadium; Attendance: 7,650; Referees: Kun-Tae Kim (KOR), Valdir Dellaqua (BRA)

==== Women's tournament ====
Roster
The following is the American roster in the women's volleyball tournament of the 2004 Summer Olympics.

Head coach: (Japan) Toshi Yoshida

No.	Name	Date of birth	Height	Weight	Spike	Block	2004 club
1	Prikeba Phipps	30 June 1969	1.91 m (6 ft 3 in)	80 kg (180 lb)	319 cm (126 in)	303 cm (119 in)	(Brazil) Minas Tênis Clube
2	Danielle Scott	1 October 1972	1.88 m (6 ft 2 in)	83 kg (183 lb)	325 cm (128 in)	302 cm (119 in)	(Italy) Pallavolo Chieri
3	Tayyiba Haneef	23 March 1979	2.00 m (6 ft 7 in)	81 kg (179 lb)	328 cm (129 in)	312 cm (123 in)	Unattached
4	Lindsey Berg	16 July 1980	1.73 m (5 ft 8 in)	74 kg (163 lb)	287 cm (113 in)	274 cm (108 in)	Unattached
5	Stacy Sykora (L)	24 June 1977	1.75 m (5 ft 9 in)	58 kg (128 lb)	305 cm (120 in)	295 cm (116 in)	(Italy) Olimpia Teodora Ravenna
6	Elisabeth Bachman	7 November 1978	1.92 m (6 ft 4 in)	85 kg (187 lb)	311 cm (122 in)	300 cm (120 in)	Unattached
7	Heather Bown	29 November 1978	1.88 m (6 ft 2 in)	88 kg (194 lb)	301 cm (119 in)	290 cm (110 in)	(Italy) Pallavolo Modena
9	Ogonna Nnamani	29 July 1983	1.83 m (6 ft 0 in)	77 kg (170 lb)	315 cm (124 in)	305 cm (120 in)	(United States) Stanford University
11	Robyn Ah Mow-Santos (c)	15 September 1975	1.72 m (5 ft 8 in)	68 kg (150 lb)	291 cm (115 in)	281 cm (111 in)	Unattached
12	Nancy Metcalf	12 November 1978	1.84 m (6 ft 0 in)	74 kg (163 lb)	314 cm (124 in)	292 cm (115 in)	(Italy) Despar Perugia
13	Tara Cross-Battle	16 September 1968	1.81 m (5 ft 11 in)	76 kg (168 lb)	302 cm (119 in)	301 cm (119 in)	Unattached
15	Logan Tom	25 May 1981	1.84 m (6 ft 0 in)	74 kg (163 lb)	306 cm (120 in)	297 cm (117 in)	(Italy) Gianno Pierallsi

Group play

Pos	Team	Pld	W	L	Pts	SW	SL	SR	SPW	SPL	SPR	Qualification
1	China	5	4	1	9	14	4	3.500	429	346	1.240	Quarterfinals
2	Russia	5	3	2	8	11	8	1.375	426	388	1.098	Quarterfinals
3	Cuba	5	3	2	8	11	10	1.100	443	460	0.963	Quarterfinals
4	United States	5	2	3	7	11	10	1.100	472	467	1.011	Quarterfinals
5	Germany	5	2	3	7	7	11	0.636	387	414	0.935	
6	Dominican Republic	5	1	4	6	3	14	0.214	334	416	0.803	

Source: FIVB

14 August 2004; 21:30	China	3–1	United States	Peace and Friendship Stadium
14 August 2004; 21:30	(25–21, 23–25, 25–22, 25–18); Report			Peace and Friendship Stadium

16 August 2004; 19:30	United States	3–1	Germany	Peace and Friendship Stadium
16 August 2004; 19:30	(25–22, 25–22, 22–25, 27–25); Report			Peace and Friendship Stadium

18 August 2004; 9:00	Dominican Republic	3–2	United States	Peace and Friendship Stadium
18 August 2004; 9:00	(26–24, 22–25, 27–25, 23–25, 19–17); Report			Peace and Friendship Stadium

20 August 2004; 21:30	United States	2–3	Russia	Peace and Friendship Stadium
20 August 2004; 21:30	(25–20, 17–25, 25–20, 18–25, 11–15); Report			Peace and Friendship Stadium

22 August 2004; 21:30	Cuba	0–3	United States	Peace and Friendship Stadium
22 August 2004; 21:30	(22–25, 12–25, 19–25); Report			Peace and Friendship Stadium

Quarterfinal

24 August 2004; 21:55	Brazil	3–2	United States	Peace and Friendship Stadium
24 August 2004; 21:55	(25–22, 25–20, 22–25, 25–27, 15–6); Report			Peace and Friendship Stadium

== Water polo ==
The U.S. men's and women's water polo teams qualified by winning the water polo event at the 2003 Pan American Games.

Summary

Team	Event	Group stage						Quarterfinal	Semifinal / Pl.	Final / BM / Pl.	
Team	Event	Opposition Score	Opposition Score	Opposition Score	Opposition Score	Opposition Score	Rank	Opposition Score	Opposition Score	Opposition Score	Rank
United States men	Men's tournament	Croatia; W 7–6	Kazakhstan; W 9–6	Hungary; L 5–7	Russia; L 7–9	Serbia and Montenegro; L 4–9	4	Did not advance	7th-10th semifinal Australia; W 6–5	7th place match Italy; W 9–8	7
United States women	Women's tournament	Hungary; W 7–6	Canada; L 5–6	Russia; W 8–4	—N/a		1 Q	Bye	Italy; L 5–6	Bronze medal match Australia; W 6–5	3rd place, bronze medalist(s)

=== Men's tournament ===
Roster
The following is the American roster in the men's water polo tournament of the 2004 Summer Olympics.

Head coach: (Italy) Ratko Rudić

№	Name	Pos.	Height	Weight	Date of birth	2004 club
1	Brandon Brooks	GK	1.98 m (6 ft 6 in)	106 kg (234 lb)	April 29, 1981	(United States) Los Angeles Water Polo Club
2	Wolf Wigo (C)	D	1.87 m (6 ft 2 in)	86 kg (190 lb)	May 8, 1973	(United States) New York Athletic Club
3	Omar Amr	CB	1.80 m (5 ft 11 in)	92 kg (203 lb)	September 20, 1974	(United States) Newport Water Polo Foundation
4	Jeff Powers	CF	1.98 m (6 ft 6 in)	104 kg (229 lb)	January 21, 1980	(United States) Newport Water Polo Foundation
5	Adam Wright	D	1.90 m (6 ft 3 in)	90 kg (200 lb)	May 4, 1977	(United States) New York Athletic Club
6	Christopher Segesman	CB	1.93 m (6 ft 4 in)	92 kg (203 lb)	June 17, 1979	(United States) Los Angeles Water Polo Club
7	Layne Beaubien	CB	1.98 m (6 ft 6 in)	99 kg (218 lb)	July 4, 1976	(United States) New York Athletic Club
8	Tony Azevedo	D	1.85 m (6 ft 1 in)	87 kg (192 lb)	November 21, 1981	(United States) Long Beach Shore Aquatics
9	Dan Klatt	CB	1.95 m (6 ft 5 in)	92 kg (203 lb)	October 28, 1978	(United States) Newport Water Polo Foundation
10	Brett Ormsby	D	1.90 m (6 ft 3 in)	83 kg (183 lb)	December 1, 1982	(United States) UCLA Bruins
11	Jesse Smith	CB	1.93 m (6 ft 4 in)	108 kg (238 lb)	April 27, 1983	(United States) New York Athletic Club
12	Genai Kerr	GK	2.03 m (6 ft 8 in)	95 kg (209 lb)	December 25, 1976	(United States) Newport Water Polo Foundation
13	Ryan Bailey	CF	1.98 m (6 ft 6 in)	113 kg (249 lb)	August 28, 1975	(United States) Newport Water Polo Foundation

Group play

Pos	Team	Pld	W	D	L	GF	GA	GD	Pts	Qualification
1	Hungary	5	5	0	0	44	27	+17	10	Qualified for the semifinals
2	Serbia and Montenegro	5	4	0	1	37	26	+11	8	Qualified for the quarterfinals
3	Russia	5	3	0	2	32	28	+4	6	Qualified for the quarterfinals
4	United States	5	2	0	3	32	37	−5	4	
5	Croatia	5	1	0	4	35	41	−6	2	
6	Kazakhstan	5	0	0	5	21	42	−21	0	

15 August 2004; 22:15	Croatia	6–7	United States	Athens Olympic Aquatic Centre; Referees: Tulga (TUR), Bookelman (NED)
15 August 2004; 22:15	Score by quarters: 0-0, 0-3, 2-1, 4-3			Athens Olympic Aquatic Centre; Referees: Tulga (TUR), Bookelman (NED)
15 August 2004; 22:15	Štritof 3	Goals	Azevedo 3	Athens Olympic Aquatic Centre; Referees: Tulga (TUR), Bookelman (NED)

17 August 2004; 16:30	Kazakhstan	6–9	United States	Athens Olympic Aquatic Centre; Referees: Patelli (BRA), Bock (GER)
17 August 2004; 16:30	Score by quarters: 1-1, 3-4, 0-1, 2-3			Athens Olympic Aquatic Centre; Referees: Patelli (BRA), Bock (GER)
17 August 2004; 16:30	Drozdov 3	Goals	Wigo 4	Athens Olympic Aquatic Centre; Referees: Patelli (BRA), Bock (GER)

19 August 2004; 10:45	United States	5–7	Hungary	Athens Olympic Aquatic Centre; Referees: Margeta (SLO), Tulga (TUR)
19 August 2004; 10:45	Score by quarters: 2-2, 2-3, 0-1, 1-1			Athens Olympic Aquatic Centre; Referees: Margeta (SLO), Tulga (TUR)
19 August 2004; 10:45	Azevedo 2	Goals	Varga, Madaras 2	Athens Olympic Aquatic Centre; Referees: Margeta (SLO), Tulga (TUR)

21 August 2004; 22:15	Russia	9–7	United States	Athens Olympic Aquatic Centre; Referees: Borrell (ESP), Bock (GER)
21 August 2004; 22:15	Score by quarters: 3-1, 3-3, 2-0, 1-3			Athens Olympic Aquatic Centre; Referees: Borrell (ESP), Bock (GER)
21 August 2004; 22:15	Eryshov, Chomakhidze 3	Goals	Beaubien, Azevedo 2	Athens Olympic Aquatic Centre; Referees: Borrell (ESP), Bock (GER)

23 August 2004; 21:00	United States	4–9	Serbia and Montenegro	Athens Olympic Aquatic Centre; Referees: Tulga (TUR), Borrell (ESP)
23 August 2004; 21:00	Score by quarters: 1-2, 1-2, 1-3, 1-2			Athens Olympic Aquatic Centre; Referees: Tulga (TUR), Borrell (ESP)
23 August 2004; 21:00	4 players with 1	Goals	Šapić 3	Athens Olympic Aquatic Centre; Referees: Tulga (TUR), Borrell (ESP)

7th to 10th place classification

27 August 2004; 10:45	United States	6–5	Australia	Athens Olympic Aquatic Centre; Referees: Matache (ROU), Legare (CAN)
27 August 2004; 10:45	Score by quarters: 2-0, 1-1, 2-2, 1-2			Athens Olympic Aquatic Centre; Referees: Matache (ROU), Legare (CAN)
27 August 2004; 10:45	Azevedo 3	Goals	Figlioli 3	Athens Olympic Aquatic Centre; Referees: Matache (ROU), Legare (CAN)

7th place match

29 August 2004; 10:45	United States	9–8	Italy	Athens Olympic Aquatic Centre; Referees: Afanasiev (RUS), Margeta (SLO)
29 August 2004; 10:45	Score by quarters: 2-2, 2-0, 2-3, 3-3			Athens Olympic Aquatic Centre; Referees: Afanasiev (RUS), Margeta (SLO)
29 August 2004; 10:45	Azevedo, Smith 3	Goals	Angelini 3	Athens Olympic Aquatic Centre; Referees: Afanasiev (RUS), Margeta (SLO)

=== Women's tournament ===
Roster
The following is the American roster in the women's water polo tournament of the 2004 Summer Olympics.

Head coach: Guy Baker

№	Name	Pos.	Height	Weight	Date of birth	2004 club
1	Jacqueline Frank	GK	1.80 m (5 ft 11 in)	72 kg (159 lb)	May 1, 1980	(United States) Golden West Water Polo
2	Heather Petri	D	1.80 m (5 ft 11 in)	70 kg (150 lb)	June 13, 1978	Unattached
3	Ericka Lorenz	D	1.80 m (5 ft 11 in)	71 kg (157 lb)	February 18, 1981	Unattached
4	Brenda Villa	D	1.62 m (5 ft 4 in)	80 kg (180 lb)	April 18, 1980	(United States) Commerce Water Polo
5	Ellen Estes	CF	1.82 m (6 ft 0 in)	77 kg (170 lb)	October 13, 1978	Unattached
6	Natalie Golda	CB	1.80 m (5 ft 11 in)	83 kg (183 lb)	December 18, 1981	(United States) New York Athletic Club
7	Margaret Dingeldein	D	1.67 m (5 ft 6 in)	58 kg (128 lb)	May 30, 1980	Unattached
8	Kelly Rulon	D	1.77 m (5 ft 10 in)	68 kg (150 lb)	August 16, 1984	(United States) San Diego Shores Water Polo
9	Heather Moody (C)	CF	1.82 m (6 ft 0 in)	77 kg (170 lb)	August 21, 1973	(United States) New York Athletic Club
10	Robin Beauregard	CB	1.75 m (5 ft 9 in)	81 kg (179 lb)	February 23, 1979	(United States) New York Athletic Club
11	Amber Stachowski	CB	1.82 m (6 ft 0 in)	72 kg (159 lb)	March 14, 1983	Unattached
12	Nicolle Payne	GK	1.75 m (5 ft 9 in)	72 kg (159 lb)	July 15, 1976	(United States) New York Athletic Club
13	Thalia Munro	CB	1.77 m (5 ft 10 in)	70 kg (150 lb)	March 8, 1982	Unattached

Group play

Pos	Team	Pld	W	D	L	GF	GA	GD	Pts	Qualification
1	United States	3	2	0	1	20	16	+4	4	Qualified for the Semifinals
2	Russia	3	2	0	1	21	22	−1	4	Qualified for the Quarterfinals
3	Hungary	3	1	0	2	19	20	−1	2	Qualified for the Quarterfinals
4	Canada	3	1	0	2	16	18	−2	2	

16 August 2004; 09:30	Report	United States	7–6	Hungary	Athens Olympic Aquatic Centre; Referees: Nikolaos Stavropoulos (GRE); Mario Brguljan (SCG)
16 August 2004; 09:30	Report	Score by quarters: 4–1, 0–2, 1–2, 2–1			Athens Olympic Aquatic Centre; Referees: Nikolaos Stavropoulos (GRE); Mario Brguljan (SCG)
16 August 2004; 09:30	Report	Villa 4 Rulon 2 Golda 1	Goals	Dravucz 1 Pelle 1 Primász 1 Stieber 1 Tiba 1 Zantleitner 1	Athens Olympic Aquatic Centre; Referees: Nikolaos Stavropoulos (GRE); Mario Brguljan (SCG)

18 August 2004; 10:45	Report	United States	5–6	Canada	Athens Olympic Aquatic Centre; Referees: Nikolaos Stavropoulos (GRE); Noel Harrod (AUS)
18 August 2004; 10:45	Report	Score by quarters: 0–0, 1–0, 3–1, 1–5			Athens Olympic Aquatic Centre; Referees: Nikolaos Stavropoulos (GRE); Noel Harrod (AUS)
18 August 2004; 10:45	Report	Beauregard 1 Dingeldein 1 Lorenz 1 Moody 1 Rulon 1	Goals	Bégin 3 Dow 2 Campbell 1	Athens Olympic Aquatic Centre; Referees: Nikolaos Stavropoulos (GRE); Noel Harrod (AUS)

20 August 2004; 10:15	Report	United States	8–4	Russia	Athens Olympic Aquatic Centre; Referees: Sergio Borrell (ESP]); Boris Margeta (SLO)
20 August 2004; 10:15	Report	Score by quarters: 1–1, 4–1, 2–1, 1–1			Athens Olympic Aquatic Centre; Referees: Sergio Borrell (ESP]); Boris Margeta (SLO)
20 August 2004; 10:15	Report	Beauregard 2 Villa 2 Dingeldein 1 Lorenz 1 Stachowski 1 Rulon 1	Goals	Salimova 1 Shepelina 1 Turova 1 Yaina 1	Athens Olympic Aquatic Centre; Referees: Sergio Borrell (ESP]); Boris Margeta (SLO)

Semifinal

24 August 2004; 17:00	Report	United States	5–6	Italy	Athens Olympic Aquatic Centre; Referees: Gábor Kiszelly (HUN); Zoran Tomić (CRO)
24 August 2004; 17:00	Report	Score by quarters: 2–1, 1–1, 1–0, 1–4			Athens Olympic Aquatic Centre; Referees: Gábor Kiszelly (HUN); Zoran Tomić (CRO)
24 August 2004; 17:00	Report	Dingeldein 1 Estes 1 Munro 1 Petri 1 Villa 1	Goals	di Mario 2 Araujo 1 Malato 1 Ragusa 1 Zanchi 1	Athens Olympic Aquatic Centre; Referees: Gábor Kiszelly (HUN); Zoran Tomić (CRO)

Bronze medal match

26 August 2004; 17:00	Report	Australia	5–6	United States	Athens Olympic Aquatic Centre; Referees: Peter Bookelman (NED); Torsten Bock (GER)
26 August 2004; 17:00	Report	Score by quarters: 0–0, 0–4, 3–1, 2–1			Athens Olympic Aquatic Centre; Referees: Peter Bookelman (NED); Torsten Bock (GER)
26 August 2004; 17:00	Report	Brooks 2 Fox 1 Gynther 1 Norwood 1	Goals	Estes 3 Beauregard 1 Golda 1 Stachowski 1	Athens Olympic Aquatic Centre; Referees: Peter Bookelman (NED); Torsten Bock (GER)

== Weightlifting ==
Five U.S. weightlifters qualified for the following events:

Athlete	Event	Snatch		Clean & Jerk		Total	
Athlete	Event	Weight	Rank	Weight	Rank	Weight	Rank
Chad Vaughn	Men's −77 kg	145	19	175	=19	320	19
Oscar Chaplin III	Men's −85 kg	160	=10	190	11	350	10
Shane Hamman	Men's +105 kg	192.5	8	237.5	7	430	7
Tara Cunningham	Women's −48 kg	77.5	=8	95	=9	172.5	10
Cheryl Haworth	Women's +75 kg	125	=5	155	=4	280	6

== Wrestling ==
The U.S. wrestlers qualified to compete in all events except the men's Greco-Roman 74 kg class.

Key:

- VT – Victory by Fall.
- PP – Decision by Points – the loser with technical points.
- PO – Decision by Points – the loser without technical points.
- VB – Victory by injury.
- EV – Excluded due to violations against the rules.

Men

Athlete	Event	Elimination Pool				Quarterfinal	Semifinal	Final / BM	
Athlete	Event	Opposition Result	Opposition Result	Opposition Result	Rank	Opposition Result	Opposition Result	Opposition Result	Rank
Stephen Abas	Freestyle 55 kg	Tulbea (MDA); W 3–1 ^{PP}	Montero (CUB); W 3–1 ^{PP}	—N/a	1 Q	Li (CHN); W 3–1 ^{PP}	Tanabe (JPN); W 3–0 ^{PO}	Batirov (RUS); L 1–3 ^{PP}	2nd place, silver medalist(s)
Eric Guerrero	Freestyle 60 kg	Pürevbaatar (MGL); L 1–3 ^{PP}	Pogosian (GEO); L 1–3 ^{PP}	—N/a	3	Did not advance			16
Jamill Kelly	Freestyle 66 kg	Asgarov (AZE); W 3–1 ^{PP}	Bodişteanu (MDA); W 3–0 ^{PO}	—N/a	1 Q	Bye	Murtazaliev (RUS); W 3–1 ^{PP}	Tedeyev (UKR); L 1–3 ^{PP}	2nd place, silver medalist(s)
Joe Williams	Freestyle 74 kg	Saghirashvili (GEO); W 3–0 ^{PO}	Hajizadeh (IRI); W 3–1 ^{PP}	—N/a	1 Q	Laliyev (KAZ); L 1–3 ^{PP}	Did not advance	Haidarau (BLR); W 5–0 ^{EV}	5
Cael Sanderson	Freestyle 84 kg	Kurugliyev (KAZ); W 3–1 ^{PP}	Borchanka (BLR); W 3–1 ^{PP}	—N/a	1 Q	Khodaei (IRI); W 3–1 ^{PP}	Romero (CUB); W 3–1 ^{PP}	Moon (KOR); W 3–1 ^{PP}	1st place, gold medalist(s)
Daniel Cormier	Freestyle 96 kg	Valach (AUT); W 3–0 ^{PO}	Bartnicki (POL); W 3–1 ^{PP}	—N/a	1 Q	Bye	Gatsalov (RUS); L 0–3 ^{PO}	Heidari (IRI); L 1–3 ^{PP}	4
Kerry McCoy	Freestyle 120 kg	Miano-Petta (ITA); W 3–0 ^{PO}	Mildzihov (KGZ); W 3–0 ^{PO}	Mutalimov (KAZ); L 1–3 ^{PP}	2	Did not advance			7
Dennis Hall	Greco-Roman 55 kg	Švehla (CZE); W 3–1 ^{PP}	Vakulenko (UKR); L 0–3 ^{PO}	—N/a	2	Did not advance			14
Jim Gruenwald	Greco-Roman 60 kg	Passos (POR); W 5–0 ^{VT}	Diaconu (ROM); L 1–3 ^{PP}	—N/a	2	Did not advance			10
Oscar Wood	Greco-Roman 66 kg	Arkoudeas (GRE); L 1–3 ^{PP}	Zamanduridis (GER); L 1–3 ^{PP}	Manukyan (KAZ); L 1–4 ^{SP}	4	Did not advance			12
Brad Vering	Greco-Roman 84 kg	Abdelfatah (EGY); L 0–3 ^{PO}	Vakhtangadze (GEO); W 5–0 ^{VB}	—N/a	2	Did not advance			11
Garrett Lowney	Greco-Roman 96 kg	Peña (CUB); L 1–3 ^{PP}	Virág (HUN); L 0–3 ^{PO}	—N/a	3	Did not advance			19
Rulon Gardner	Greco-Roman 120 kg	Mikulski (POL); W 3–0 ^{PO}	Mureiko (BUL); W 3–1 ^{PP}	Mizgaitis (LTU); W 3–0 ^{PO}	1 Q	Bye	Tsurtsumia (KAZ); L 1–3 ^{PP}	Barzi (IRI); W 3–0 ^{PO}	3rd place, bronze medalist(s)

Women

Athlete	Event	Elimination Pool				Classification	Semifinal	Final / BM	
Athlete	Event	Opposition Result	Opposition Result	Opposition Result	Rank	Opposition Result	Opposition Result	Opposition Result	Rank
Patricia Miranda	48 kg	Li (CHN); W 3–1 ^{PP}	Oorzhak (RUS); W 3–1 ^{PP}	Caripá (VEN); W 4–1 ^{SP}	1 Q	Bye	Merleni (UKR); L 0–3 ^{PO}	Berthenet (FRA); W 3–1 ^{PP}	3rd place, bronze medalist(s)
Tela O'Donnell	55 kg	Smirnova (RUS); W 5–0 ^{VT}	Verbeek (CAN); L 1–4 ^{SP}	—N/a	2	Fonseca (PUR); L 1–3 ^{PP}	Did not advance		6
Sara McMann	63 kg	Meng (CHN); W 5–0 ^{VT}	Yanik (CAN); L 1–3 ^{PP}	—N/a	1 Q	Bye	Zygouri (GRE); W 5–0 ^{VT}	Icho (JPN); L 1–3 ^{PP}	2nd place, silver medalist(s)
Toccara Montgomery	72 kg	Hamaguchi (JPN); L 1–3 ^{PP}	Zlateva (BUL); W 5–0 ^{VT}	—N/a	2	Nordhagen (CAN); L 1–3 ^{PP}	Did not advance		7

== See also ==
- United States at the 2003 Pan American Games
- United States at the 2004 Summer Paralympics
