= Lauren Spalding =

American canoeist (born 1980)

Lauren Neaulani Spalding (born March 17, 1980) represented the United States as a kayaker in the 2004 Summer Olympics. She is also a world champion outrigger canoe paddler and surfski racer.

== Paddling career ==
=== Flat-Water Kayaking ===
Spalding represented the United States as a sprint canoer in the early- to mid-2000s. She paddled in the USA National Team Trials in New York in 2003 and qualified for the team, going on compete in the K-2 (Women's Kayak Doubles) 500m and K-4 (Women's Kayak Fours) 500m events at the 2004 Pan American Games and the 2004 Olympics.

==== 2004 Pan American Games ====
- K-2 (Women's Kayak Doubles) 500m - 2nd place
- K-4 (Women's Kayak Fours) 500m - 1st place

==== 2004 Olympic Games ====
- K-2 (Women's Kayak Doubles) 500m - semi-finalist (with Kathy Colin)
- K-4 (Women's Kayak Fours) 500m - semi-finalist (with Carrie Johnson, Kathy Colin, and Marie Mijalis)

=== Outrigger Canoe Paddling ===
==== OC-1 Canoe Paddling ====
Spalding is a 12-time winner of the Molokai OC-1 World Championships, a 32-mile race across the Kaiwi Channel separating the Hawaiian islands of Molokai and Oahu, and holds the seven fastest times ever achieved by a female in the race.

==== OC-6 Canoe Paddling ====
Spalding competes in long distance OC-6 ("six-man" outrigger canoe) races with Team Bradley. As a crew member, she has notched ten victories in the Na Wahine O Ke Kai, a 41-mile race across the Kaiwi Channel that is considered to be the world championship of long-distance outrigger canoe paddling.

=== Surfski Racing ===
Spalding is a 3-time winner of the Molokai World Surfski Championships.

== Personal life ==
Spalding is part Native Hawaiian.
