= Margaret Dingeldein =

American water polo player (born 1980)

Personal information
- Born: May 30, 1980 (age 46) Merced, California, United States

Sport
- Sport: Water polo
Medal record
Representing United States
Olympic Games
Bronze medal – third place	2004 Athens	Team competition
World Championships
Gold medal – first place	2003 Barcelona	Team competition

Margaret "Margie" Dingeldein (born May 30, 1980) is an American water polo player who won a bronze medal in the 2004 Athens Olympics. Her position is attacker, and she is considered an excellent perimeter shooter.

== High school ==
Dingeldein attended Merced High School and was named a water polo high school All-American and member of the U.S. Junior National Team. In 1998, she graduated valedictorian of her high school class and was named a National Merit Finalist.

== College ==
As a freshman at Stanford University in 1999, Dingeldein was the Cardinals' top scorer with 45 goals. She earned first-team all-tournament at the water polo National Tournament, as well as Academic All-American. In 2000, she again led the team in scoring with 59 goals and was named First Team All-America by the American Water Polo Coaches Association. Dingeldein scored a team-high nine goals in the four games at the National Championships, including four in a win over Princeton University. In 2001, Dingeldein was second on the team in scoring with 48 goals and again earned Academic All-American. She was second again with 35 goals in 2002, when the Stanford women's water polo team defeated the UCLA Bruins 8-4 in the NCAA Women's Water Polo Championships, winning the Cardinal their first NCAA water polo title. Dingeldein graduated from Stanford University in 2002 with a degree in human biology.

Dingeldein attended medical school at the University of California, San Francisco, and on graduating became an anesthesiology resident at UCSF Medical Center.

== International ==
Dingeldein was a member of the US National Team, winning the gold medal in 2003 at the FINA World Water Polo Championships. She scored 8 goals in two games at the 2003 Pan American Games, qualifying Team USA for the Olympics. At the Athens Olympics in 2004, Dingeldein contributed a goal each in the games against Russia, Canada and Italy, and the US women took home an Olympic bronze medal.

In 2005, Dingeldein joined the women's water polo team coaching staff at the University of Hawaii.

== See also ==
- United States women's Olympic water polo team records and statistics
- List of Olympic medalists in water polo (women)
- List of world champions in women's water polo
- List of World Aquatics Championships medalists in water polo
