= Amber Stachowski =

American water polo player (born 1983)

Personal information
- Born: March 14, 1983 (age 43) Mission Viejo, California, U.S.

Sport
- Sport: Water polo
Medal record
Representing United States
Olympic Games
Bronze medal – third place	2004 Athens	Team competition
World Championships
Gold medal – first place	2003 Barcelona	Team competition
Pan American Games
Gold medal – first place	2003 Santo Domingo	Team competition

Amber Val Stachowski (born March 14, 1983) is an American water polo player for the UCLA Bruins and the U.S. National Team, who won the bronze medal at the 2004 Athens Olympics. Her position is center defender.

== High school and college ==
At Capistrano Valley High School, Stachowski was a three-time First-Team All-American (1999–2001) and 2001 California Interscholastic Federation Player of the Year. In club play she was a member of the 2001 Golden West team that won the Winter Junior Nationals, and was named MVP of the tournament.

As a UCLA freshman in 2002, Stachowski scored a goal in her first collegiate game against UC Irvine, and recorded first collegiate career hat trick against Stanford. In her first year, she had 29 goals on 43 attempts.

== International and Olympics ==
At the fourth FINA Junior World Women's Water Polo Championships in 2001, UCLA freshman Amber Stachowski led the US to a gold medal. Stachowski led the US team with four goals in the 10-9 overtime victory over Australia. Stachowski redshirted during the 2003–2004 season to train with the United States National Team and play in the 2004 Summer Olympics in Athens, Greece. But in 2003, Stachowski sustained a concussion in a motor vehicle accident on a Los Angeles freeway, which kept her out of the water for a few weeks. She recovered and qualified for the Olympic team 6 months later.

After Team USA earned first place in the 2003 Pan American Games and 2003 FINA World Championships, Stachowski scored two goals in the Olympics in games against Russia and Australia, helping win the bronze medal for the United States.

== See also ==
- List of Olympic medalists in water polo (women)
- List of world champions in women's water polo
- List of World Aquatics Championships medalists in water polo
