= Marie Mijalis =

American canoeist (born 1981)

Marie Mijalis (born February 1, 1981, in Shreveport, Louisiana) is an American sprint canoer who competed in the mid-2000s. At the 2004 Summer Olympics, she was eliminated in the semifinals of the K-4 500 m event.
