= Great Britain at the 2004 Summer Olympics =

- Flag of the United Kingdom
- IOC code: GBR
- NOC: British Olympic Association

in Athens
- Competitors: 264 in 22 sports
- Flag bearers: Kate Howey (opening); Kelly Holmes (closing)
- Medals Ranked 10th: Gold 9 Silver 9 Bronze 12 Total 30

Summer Olympics appearances (overview)
- 1896; 1900; 1904; 1908; 1912; 1920; 1924; 1928; 1932; 1936; 1948; 1952; 1956; 1960; 1964; 1968; 1972; 1976; 1980; 1984; 1988; 1992; 1996; 2000; 2004; 2008; 2012; 2016; 2020; 2024

Other related appearances
- 1906 Intercalated Games

Great Britain, the team of the British Olympic Association (BOA), competed at the 2004 Summer Olympics in Athens, Greece, from 13 to 29 August 2004 with the team of selected athletes was officially known as Team GB. The British sent a wide-ranging delegation to the Games, continuing its ubiquitous presence at the Olympics. Great Britain's 264 athletes, 161 men and 103 women, competed in 22 disciplines throughout the two-week event. The team entered the opening ceremony behind the Union Flag carried by judoka Kate Howey. Double gold medal winner Kelly Holmes carried the flag at the closing ceremony.

These games continued the success that Great Britain made at Sydney. Although they won just nine gold medals compared with the eleven won at Sydney, the team did increase their overall medal haul to thirty medals, and for the second summer games in a row finished in tenth place on the medal table.

== Chronology ==
The delegation started the Olympics slowly, the silver its divers won on 14 August being the first of only a few opening-week medals. Although a sprinkling of silver and bronze medals – including a pair in men's and women's k1 kayak slalom – enlivened the mid-week, Britain's first gold did not come until Friday the 20th (won by Chris Hoy in the 1 km track cycling time-trial).

Then, on 21 August ("Golden Saturday") Britain's contributions to the medal table became more significant. First Britain's traditional strength in rowing continued as the men's coxless four, stroked by Matthew Pinsent, narrowly won gold, a defining moment since this was Pinsent's fourth gold medal in as many games. Sailor Ben Ainslie wrapped up a successful few days of racing with a gold, as did the women's Yngling sailboats who were finally awarded the gold medal they had sewn up on Thursday. Bradley Wiggins continued Britain's cycling success, winning gold in the 4 km pursuit. Young swimmer David Davies, coming third in the men's 1500 m freestyle, set a European record in the process and won Britain's second swimming medal of the games – a notable improvement over the 2000 Sydney games from which the swimmers had returned empty-handed. Also on Saturday, it was announced that, after an appeal, Leslie Law would be promoted from silver to gold in the three-day equestrian eventing (and his team from bronze to silver). As the games' aquatic-dominated first week shifted into a second week focused more on track and field events, Kelly Sotherton came third in the heptathlon.

Sunday 22 August brought another rowing medal. However, marathon favourite Paula Radcliffe failed to cope with the heat of Athens and did not finish. The timing of the race with a late afternoon start, supposedly to appease US broadcasters, produced some controversy since summer marathons normally start early in the morning to avoid the heat.

23 August saw Britain's first gold medal of the track and field events, Kelly Holmes winning the women's 800 metres. This was Britain's first gold medal on the track since Sally Gunnell won the 400-metre hurdles at the 1992 Barcelona games.

By claiming bronze in the Madison cycling on 25 August, to add to his earlier individual gold and a silver from the team pursuit, Bradley Wiggins became the first Briton for 40 years to claim three medals in one games.

The evening of Saturday 28 August saw Britain's medal hunt centred on the Olympic Stadium. Steve Backley, in his final javelin throw competition, failed to win the gold he had been seeking since 1992, finishing fourth. Kelly Holmes achieved the middle-distance double, taking gold in the 1500 metres. The men's 4×100-metre relay team won a surprising victory, winning gold ahead of the American team. Earlier in the day, Ian Wynne had added to the medal haul, with a bronze medal in the K1 kayak class, competing despite an ankle injury picked up the day before.

The final day of the games, 29 August, saw Amir Khan collect Britain's last medal of the event with a silver in boxing's lightweight division.

== Overall performance ==
In the final medal table, Great Britain finished in 10th place overall. The BBC stated that this was "the best British performance in the modern era", and quantified this with further considerations: "GB won 37 in 1984, but that was a boycott-hit Games missing the Eastern Bloc countries. Take Los Angeles out of the picture, and this was Britain's best haul since 1924."

== Medallists ==
Great Britain finished in tenth position in the final medal rankings, with 9 gold and 30 total medals.

Medal	Name	Sport	Event	Date
1st place, gold medalist(s)	Leslie Law	Equestrian	Individual eventing	August 18
1st place, gold medalist(s)	Chris Hoy	Cycling	Men's track time trial	August 20
1st place, gold medalist(s)	Bradley Wiggins	Cycling	Men's individual pursuit	August 21
1st place, gold medalist(s)	Ed Coode; James Cracknell; Matthew Pinsent; Steve Williams	Rowing	Men's four	August 21
1st place, gold medalist(s)	Ben Ainslie	Sailing	Finn class	August 21
1st place, gold medalist(s)	Sarah Ayton; Shirley Robertson; Sarah Webb	Sailing	Yngling class	August 21
1st place, gold medalist(s)	Kelly Holmes	Athletics	Women's 800 m	August 23
1st place, gold medalist(s)	Kelly Holmes	Athletics	Women's 1500 m	August 28
1st place, gold medalist(s)	Darren Campbell; Marlon Devonish; Jason Gardener; Mark Lewis-Francis	Athletics	Men's 4 × 100 m relay	August 28
2nd place, silver medalist(s)	Leon Taylor; Peter Waterfield	Diving	Men's synchronised 10 m platform	August 14
2nd place, silver medalist(s)	Jeanette Brakewell; William Fox-Pitt; Pippa Funnell; Mary King; Leslie Law	Equestrian	Team eventing	August 18
2nd place, silver medalist(s)	Gail Emms; Nathan Robertson	Badminton	Mixed doubles	August 19
2nd place, silver medalist(s)	Campbell Walsh	Canoeing	Men's slalom K-1	August 19
2nd place, silver medalist(s)	Cath Bishop; Katherine Grainger	Rowing	Women's pair	August 21
2nd place, silver medalist(s)	Debbie Flood; Frances Houghton; Alison Mowbray; Rebecca Romero	Rowing	Women's quadruple sculls	August 22
2nd place, silver medalist(s)	Steve Cummings; Rob Hayles; Paul Manning; Bradley Wiggins	Cycling	Men's team pursuit	August 23
2nd place, silver medalist(s)	Jonathan Glanfield; Nick Rogers	Sailing	Men's 470 class	August 28
2nd place, silver medalist(s)	Amir Khan	Boxing	Lightweight	August 29
3rd place, bronze medalist(s)	Stephen Parry	Swimming	Men's 200 m butterfly	August 17
3rd place, bronze medalist(s)	Alison Williamson	Archery	Women's individual	August 18
3rd place, bronze medalist(s)	Helen Reeves	Canoeing	Women's slalom K-1	August 18
3rd place, bronze medalist(s)	Pippa Funnell	Equestrian	Individual eventing	August 18
3rd place, bronze medalist(s)	Kelly Sotherton	Athletics	Women's heptathlon	August 21
3rd place, bronze medalist(s)	Elise Laverick; Sarah Winckless	Rowing	Women's double sculls	August 21
3rd place, bronze medalist(s)	David Davies	Swimming	Men's 1500 m freestyle	August 21
3rd place, bronze medalist(s)	Rob Hayles; Bradley Wiggins	Cycling	Men's madison	August 25
3rd place, bronze medalist(s)	Nick Dempsey	Sailing	Men's sailboard	August 25
3rd place, bronze medalist(s)	Chris Draper; Simon Hiscocks	Sailing	49er class	August 26
3rd place, bronze medalist(s)	Georgina Harland	Modern pentathlon	Women's event	August 27
3rd place, bronze medalist(s)	Ian Wynne	Canoeing	Men's K-1 500 m	August 28

Medals by sport
Sport	1st place, gold medalist(s)	2nd place, silver medalist(s)	3rd place, bronze medalist(s)	Total
Athletics	3	0	1	4
Sailing	2	1	2	5
Cycling	2	1	1	4
Rowing	1	2	1	4
Equestrian	1	1	1	3
Canoeing	0	1	2	3
Badminton	0	1	0	1
Boxing	0	1	0	1
Diving	0	1	0	1
Swimming	0	0	2	2
Archery	0	0	1	1
Modern pentathlon	0	0	1	1
Total	9	9	12	30

Medals by date
Day	Date	1st place, gold medalist(s)	2nd place, silver medalist(s)	3rd place, bronze medalist(s)	Total
1	14 Aug	0	1	0	1
2	15 Aug	0	0	0	0
3	16 Aug	0	0	0	0
4	17 Aug	0	0	1	1
5	18 Aug	1	1	3	5
6	19 Aug	0	2	0	2
7	20 Aug	1	0	0	1
8	21 Aug	4	1	3	8
9	22 Aug	0	1	0	1
10	23 Aug	1	1	0	2
11	24 Aug	0	0	0	0
12	25 Aug	0	0	2	2
13	26 Aug	0	0	1	1
14	27 Aug	0	0	1	1
15	28 Aug	2	1	1	4
16	29 Aug	0	1	0	1
Total		9	9	12	30

=== Multiple medallists ===
The following Team GB competitors won multiple medals at the 2004 Olympic Games. Kelly Holmes became the first British athlete since 1972 and the first British track and field athlete to win two gold medals at the same Summer Olympics.

Name	Medal	Sport	Event
Kelly Holmes	Gold Gold	Athletics	800 m 1500 m
Bradley Wiggins	Gold Silver Bronze	Cycling	Men's Individual pursuit Team pursuit Men's Madison
Leslie Law	Gold Silver	Equestrian	Individual eventing Team eventing
Rob Hayles	Silver Bronze	Cycling	Team pursuit Men's Madison

== Archery ==
Four British archers (one man and three women) qualified each for the men's and women's individual archery, and a spot for the women's team.

Athlete	Event	Ranking round		Round of 64	Round of 32	Round of 16	Quarterfinals	Semi-finals	Final / BM	
Athlete	Event	Score	Seed	Opposition Score	Opposition Score	Opposition Score	Opposition Score	Opposition Score	Opposition Score	Rank
Laurence Godfrey	Men's individual	650	31	Orbay (TUR); W 157–155	Petersson (SWE); W 163–162	Ruban (UKR); W 167–162	Chen S-Y (TPE); W 110–108	Galiazzo (ITA); L 108–110	Cuddihy (AUS); L 112–113	4
Naomi Folkard	Women's individual	638	17	Pilipova (KAZ); W 139–128	Piuva (FIN); W 156–151	Park S-H (KOR); L 159–171	Did not advance			
Helen Palmer	Women's individual	594	61	He Y (CHN); L 130–141	Did not advance					
Alison Williamson	Women's individual	637	21	Dykman (USA); W 147–121	Kawauchi (JPN); W 154–150	Zhang Jj (CHN); W 165–161	He Y (CHN); W 109–89	Park S-H (KOR); L 100–110	Yuan S-C (TPE); W 105–104	3rd place, bronze medalist(s)
Naomi Folkard; Helen Palmer; Alison Williamson	Women's team	1869	12	—N/a		India; L 228–230	Did not advance			

== Athletics ==
British athletes have so far achieved qualifying standards in the following athletics events (up to a maximum of 3 athletes in each event at the 'A' Standard, and 1 at the 'B' Standard).

Key

- Note–Ranks given for track events are within the athlete's heat only
- Q = Qualified for the next round
- q = Qualified for the next round as a fastest loser or, in field events, by position without achieving the qualifying target
- NR = National record
- N/A = Round not applicable for the event
- Bye = Athlete not required to compete in round

Men
Track & road events

Athlete	Event	Heat		Quarter-final		Semi-final		Final	
Athlete	Event	Result	Rank	Result	Rank	Result	Rank	Result	Rank
Darren Campbell	100 m	10.35	4	Did not advance					
Jason Gardener	100 m	10.15	2 Q	10.15	2 Q	10.12	5	Did not advance	
Mark Lewis-Francis	100 m	10.13	1 Q	10.12	2 Q	10.28	5	Did not advance	
Darren Campbell	200 m	20.72	4 Q	20.59	4 q	20.89	8	Did not advance	
Chris Lambert	200 m	DNF		Did not advance					
Christian Malcolm	200 m	20.62	2 Q	20.56	5 q	20.77	7	Did not advance	
Timothy Benjamin	400 m	45.69	3 q	—N/a		46.28	8	Did not advance	
Daniel Caines	400 m	46.15	4	—N/a		Did not advance			
Malachi Davis	400 m	46.28	5	—N/a		Did not advance			
Ricky Soos	800 m	1:45.70	2 Q	—N/a		1:46.74	6	Did not advance	
Michael East	1500 m	3:37.37	1 Q	—N/a		3:36.46	6 q	3:36.33	6
John Mayock	5000 m	13:26.81	10	—N/a				Did not advance	
Robert Newton	110 m hurdles	13.85	7	Did not advance					
Andy Turner	110 m hurdles	13.75	8	Did not advance					
Matthew Douglas	400 m hurdles	49.77	6	—N/a		Did not advance			
Chris Rawlinson	400 m hurdles	48.94	3 Q	—N/a		50.89	8	Did not advance	
Justin Chaston	3000 m steeplechase	8:28.35	5	—N/a				Did not advance	
Darren Campbell; Marlon Devonish; Jason Gardener; Mark Lewis-Francis	4 × 100 m relay	38.53	2 Q	—N/a				38.07	1st place, gold medalist(s)
Sean Baldock; Timothy Benjamin; Malachi Davis; Matthew Elias	4 × 400 m relay	3:02.40	1 Q	—N/a				3:01.07	5
Jon Brown	Marathon	—N/a						2:12.26	4
Matt O'Dowd	Marathon	—N/a						2:22.37	50
Dan Robinson	Marathon	—N/a						2:17.53	23

Field events

Athlete	Event	Qualification		Final	
Athlete	Event	Distance	Position	Distance	Position
Chris Tomlinson	Long jump	8.23	3 Q	8.25	5
Nathan Douglas	Triple jump	16.84	13	Did not advance	
Phillips Idowu	Triple jump	17.33	4 Q	NM	—
Nick Buckfield	Pole vault	5.60	21	Did not advance	
Emeka Udechuku	Discus throw	58.41	24	Did not advance	
Steve Backley	Javelin throw	80.68	12 q	84.13	4
Nick Nieland	Javelin throw	72.79	28	Did not advance	

Combined events – Decathlon

Athlete	Event	100 m	LJ	SP	HJ	400 m	110H	DT	PV	JT	1500 m	Final	Rank
Dean Macey	Result	10.89	7.47	15.73	2.15	48.97	14.56	48.34	4.40	58.46	4:25.42	8414	4
Dean Macey	Points	885	927	835	944	863	903	846	731	715	775	8414	4

Women
Track & road events

Athlete	Event	Heat		Quarter-final		Semi-final		Final	
Athlete	Event	Result	Rank	Result	Rank	Result	Rank	Result	Rank
Abi Oyepitan	100 m	11.23	2 Q	11.28	3 Q	11.18	5	Did not advance	
Joice Maduaka	200 m	23.15	4 Q	23.30	5	Did not advance			
Abi Oyepitan	200 m	22.50	2 Q	22.79	2 Q	22.56	2 Q	22.87	=7
Donna Fraser	400 m	51.19	2 Q	—N/a		51.94	7	Did not advance	
Lee McConnell	400 m	51.19	2 Q	—N/a		52.63	8	Did not advance	
Christine Ohuruogu	400 m	50.50	3 Q	—N/a		51.00	4	Did not advance	
Joanne Fenn	800 m	2:03.72	3 Q	—N/a		2:00.60	5	Did not advance	
Kelly Holmes	800 m	2:00.81	1 Q	—N/a		1:57.98	1 Q	1:56.38	1st place, gold medalist(s)
Kelly Holmes	1500 m	4:05.58	2 Q	—N/a		4:04.77	2 Q	3:57.90 NR	1st place, gold medalist(s)
Jo Pavey	1500 m	4:12.50	13	—N/a		Did not advance			
Hayley Tullett	1500 m	4:07.27	7 q	—N/a		4:08.92	11	Did not advance	
Jo Pavey	5000 m	14:55.45	3 Q	—N/a				14:57.87	5
Kathy Butler	10000 m	—N/a						31:41.13	12
Paula Radcliffe	10000 m	—N/a						DNF	
Sarah Claxton	100 m hurdles	13.14	6	—N/a		Did not advance			
Tracey Morris	Marathon	—N/a						2:41:00	29
Paula Radcliffe	Marathon	—N/a						DNF	
Liz Yelling	Marathon	—N/a						2:40:13	25
Donna Fraser; Helen Karagounis*; Lee McConnell; Catherine Murphy; Christine Ohuruogu	4 × 400 m relay	3:26.99	4 q	—N/a				3:25.12	4

* Competed only in heats

Field events

Athlete	Event	Qualification		Final	
Athlete	Event	Distance	Position	Distance	Position
Jade Johnson	Long jump	6.71	6 Q	6.80	6
Shelley Newman	Discus throw	56.04	33	Did not advance	
Philippa Roles	Discus throw	58.83	18	Did not advance	
Goldie Sayers	Javelin throw	59.11	20	Did not advance	
Lorraine Shaw	Hammer throw	64.79	30	Did not advance	
Shirley Webb	Hammer throw	61.60	41	Did not advance	

Combined events – Heptathlon

Athlete	Event	100H	HJ	SP	200 m	LJ	JT	800 m	Final	Rank
Denise Lewis	Result	13.40	1.73	15.33	25.42	5.89	DNS	—	DNF	
Denise Lewis	Points	1065	891	883	849	816	0	—	DNF	
Kelly Sotherton	Result	13.44	1.85	13.29	23.57	6.51	37.19	2:12.27	6424	3rd place, bronze medalist(s)
Kelly Sotherton	Points	1059	1041	747	1022	1010	613	932	6424	3rd place, bronze medalist(s)

== Badminton ==
Men

Athlete	Event	Round of 32	Round of 16	Quarterfinal	Semi-final	Final / BM	
Athlete	Event	Opposition Score	Opposition Score	Opposition Score	Opposition Score	Opposition Score	Rank
Richard Vaughan	Singles	Vasconcelos (POR); W 15–5, 15–5	Shon S-M (KOR); L 9–15, 4–15	Did not advance			
Anthony Clark; Nathan Robertson	Doubles	Ngernsrisuk / Prapakamol (THA); W 15–5, 15–9	Hian / Limpele (INA); L 7–15, 12–15	Did not advance			

Women

Athlete	Event	Round of 32	Round of 16	Quarterfinal	Semi-final	Final / BM	
Athlete	Event	Opposition Score	Opposition Score	Opposition Score	Opposition Score	Opposition Score	Rank
Tracey Hallam	Singles	Schenk (GER); W 11–7, 6–11, 11–9	Martin (DEN); W 11–2, 5–11, 13–10	Audina (NED); L 0–11, 9–11	Did not advance		
Kelly Morgan	Singles	Permana (AUS); W 11–5, 11–3	Zhang N (CHN); L 6–11, 8–11	Did not advance			
Gail Emms; Donna Kellogg	Doubles	Koon W C / Li W M (HKG); W 15–4, 15–4	Wei Yl / Zhao Tt (CHN); L 15–13, 7–15, 5–15	Did not advance			
Ella Tripp; Joanne Wright	Doubles	Boteva / Nedelcheva (BUL); W 17–15, 17–14	Audina / Bruil (NED); L 7–15, 7–15	Did not advance			

Mixed

Athlete	Event	Round of 32	Round of 16	Quarterfinal	Semi-final	Final / BM	
Athlete	Event	Opposition Score	Opposition Score	Opposition Score	Opposition Score	Opposition Score	Rank
Robert Blair; Natalie Munt	Doubles	Ohtsuka / Yamamoto (JPN); W 13–15, 15–7, 15–13	Marissa / Widianto (INA); L 8–15, 12–15	Did not advance			
Gail Emms; Nathan Robertson	Doubles	Bye	Pitro / Siegemund (GER); W 15–11, 15–4	Chen Qq / Zhao Tt (CHN); W 15–8, 17–15	Olsen / Rasmussen (DEN); W 15–6, 15–12	Gao / Zhang (CHN); L 1–15, 15–12, 12–15	2nd place, silver medalist(s)

== Boxing ==
Great Britain sent only one boxer to Athens, the 17-year-old Amir Khan. Khan tore through his first four fights, including two that the referees had to stop prematurely. His loss in the final to the defending Olympic champion and three-time world champion gave Khan a 4–1 record and a silver medal; many hoped he would compete the 2008 Summer Olympics but in the event he decided to turn professional later in 2004.

Athlete	Event	Round of 32	Round of 16	Quarterfinals	Semi-finals	Final	
Athlete	Event	Opposition Result	Opposition Result	Opposition Result	Opposition Result	Opposition Result	Rank
Amir Khan	Lightweight	Kaperonis (GRE); W RSC	Stilianov (BUL); W 37–21	Baik J-S (KOR); W RSC	Yeleuov (KAZ); W 40–26	Kindelán (CUB); L 22–30	2nd place, silver medalist(s)

== Canoeing ==
=== Slalom ===
Athlete	Event	Preliminary						Semi-final		Final			
Athlete	Event	Run 1	Rank	Run 2	Rank	Total	Rank	Time	Rank	Time	Rank	Total	Rank
Stuart McIntosh	Men's C-1	99.87	3	102.87	7	202.74	5 Q	100.08	7 Q	111.11	8	211.19	8
Stuart Bowman; Nick Smith	Men's C-2	102.25	2	111.16	6	213.41	2 Q	114.02	9	Did not advance			
Campbell Walsh	Men's K-1	91.25	1	97.73	12	188.98	2 Q	93.68	1 Q	96.49	3	190.17	2nd place, silver medalist(s)
Helen Reeves	Women's K-1	110.12	5	103.51	1	213.63	3 Q	108.90	5 Q	109.87	4	218.77	3rd place, bronze medalist(s)

=== Sprint ===
Athlete	Event	Heats		Semi-finals		Final	
Athlete	Event	Time	Rank	Time	Rank	Time	Rank
Tim Brabants	Men's K-1 1000 m	3:24.412	1 Q	Bye		3:30.552	5
Ian Wynne	Men's K-1 500 m	1:37.341	1 q	1:38.911	1 Q	1:38.547	3rd place, bronze medalist(s)
Paul Darby-Dowman; Ian Wynne	Men's K-2 1000 m	3:10.819	2 Q	Bye		3:20.848	7
Lucy Hardy	Women's K-1 500 m	1:54.518	4 q	1:56.432	3 Q	1:53.717	7

Qualification Legend: Q = Qualify to final; q = Qualify to semifinal

== Cycling ==
=== Road ===
Men

Athlete	Event	Time	Rank
Stuart Dangerfield	Road race	Did not finish	
Stuart Dangerfield	Time trial	1:00:03.72	28
Roger Hammond	Road race	5:41:56	7
Charly Wegelius	Road race	Did not finish	
Julian Winn	Road race	Did not finish	

Women

Athlete	Event	Time	Rank
Nicole Cooke	Road race	3:25:03	5
Nicole Cooke	Time trial	33:45.22	19
Rachel Heal	Road race	3:25:42	22
Sara Symington	Road race	Did not finish	

=== Track ===
Sprint

Athlete	Event	Qualification		Round 1	Repechage 1	Round 2	Repechage 2	Quarterfinals	Semi-finals	Final	
Athlete	Event	Time Speed (km/h)	Rank	Opposition Time Speed (km/h)	Opposition Time Speed (km/h)	Opposition Time Speed (km/h)	Opposition Time Speed (km/h)	Opposition Time Speed (km/h)	Opposition Time Speed (km/h)	Opposition Time Speed (km/h)	Rank
Ross Edgar	Men's sprint	10.381; 69.357	3	Forde (BAR); W 10.768; 66.864	Bye	Zieliński (POL); L	Ng (MAS); Eadie (AUS); W 10.906; 66.018	Bos (NED); L, L	Did not advance	5th place final Forde (BAR); Zieliński (POL); Bourgain (FRA); W 11.214	5
Victoria Pendleton	Women's sprint	11.646; 61.823	10	Abassova (RUS); L	Meinke (GER); Hijgenaar (NED); L	—N/a		Did not advance		9th place final Reed (USA); Hijgenaar (NED); Radanova (BUL); W 12.699	9
Chris Hoy; Craig MacLean; Jamie Staff	Men's team sprint	44.693; 60.412	7 Q	Germany; L 44.075; 61.259	—N/a					Did not advance	5

Pursuit

Athlete	Event	Qualification		Semi-finals		Final	
Athlete	Event	Time	Rank	Opponent Results	Rank	Opponent Results	Rank
Rob Hayles	Men's individual pursuit	4:17.930	4 Q	Dyudya (UKR); 4:19.559	3 Q	Escobar (ESP); 4:22.291	4
Bradley Wiggins	Men's individual pursuit	4:15.165	1 Q	Sanchez (FRA); 4:17.215	1 Q	McGee (AUS); 4:16.304	1st place, gold medalist(s)
Emma Davies	Women's individual pursuit	3:35.609	7 Q	Mactier (AUS); LAP	8	Did not advance	
Steve Cummings; Rob Hayles; Paul Manning; Bradley Wiggins	Men's team pursuit	4:03.985	2 Q	France; 3:59.866	2 Q	Australia; 4:01.760	2nd place, silver medalist(s)

Time trial

Athlete	Event	Time	Rank
Chris Hoy	Men's time trial	1:00.711 OR	1st place, gold medalist(s)
Craig MacLean	Men's time trial	1:02.369	7
Victoria Pendleton	Women's time trial	34.626	6

Keirin

Athlete	Event	1st round	Repechage	2nd round	Final
Athlete	Event	Rank	Rank	Rank	Rank
Ross Edgar	Men's keirin	5 R	4	Did not advance	
Jamie Staff	Men's keirin	3 R	1 Q	REL	12

Omnium

Athlete	Event	Points	Laps	Rank
Emma Davies	Women's points race	4	0	12
Rob Hayles; Bradley Wiggins	Men's madison	12	0	3rd place, bronze medalist(s)

=== Mountain biking ===
Athlete	Event	Time	Rank
Oli Beckingsale	Men's cross-country	2:23:15	17
Liam Killeen	Men's cross-country	2:18:32	5

== Diving ==
British divers qualified for eight individual spots at the 2004 Olympic Games. Three British synchronised diving teams qualified through the 2004 FINA Diving World Cup.

Men

Athlete	Event	Preliminaries		Semi-finals		Final	
Athlete	Event	Points	Rank	Points	Rank	Points	Rank
Tony Ally	3 m springboard	401.52	16 Q	617.13	15	Did not advance	
Mark Shipman	3 m springboard	396.90	18 Q	599.88	18	Did not advance	
Leon Taylor	10 m platform	433.38	11 Q	628.47	9 Q	663.12	6
Peter Waterfield	10 m platform	474.03	4 Q	654.54	6 Q	669.24	5
Tony Ally; Mark Shipman	3 m synchronised springboard	—N/a				334.98	5
Leon Taylor; Peter Waterfield	10m synchronised platform	—N/a				371.52	2nd place, silver medalist(s)

Women

Athlete	Event	Preliminaries		Semi-finals		Final	
Athlete	Event	Points	Rank	Points	Rank	Points	Rank
Tracey Richardson	3 m springboard	209.34	28	Did not advance			
Jane Smith	3 m springboard	282.90	14 Q	483.75	15	Did not advance	
Tandi Gerrard; Jane Smith	3 m synchronised springboard	—N/a				302.25	4

== Equestrian ==
Because only three horse and rider pairs from each nation could advance beyond certain rounds in the individual events, five British pairs did not advance despite being placed sufficiently high. They received rankings below all pairs that did advance.

=== Dressage ===
Athlete	Horse	Event	Grand Prix		Grand Prix Special		Grand Prix Freestyle		Overall	
Athlete	Horse	Event	Score	Rank	Score	Rank	Score	Rank	Score	Rank
Richard Davison	Ballaseyr Royale	Individual	68.542	21 Q	66.160	22	Did not advance			
Carl Hester	Escapado	Individual	70.667	=12 Q	72.440	9 Q	71.575	14	71.561	13
Emma Hindle	Wie Weltmeyer	Individual	67.500	25	Did not advance					
Nicola McGivern	Active Walero	Individual	66.458	34	Did not advance					
Richard Davison; Carl Hester; Emma Hindle; Nicola McGivern	See above	Team	—N/a						68.903	7

=== Eventing ===
Athlete	Horse	Event	Dressage		Cross-country			Jumping						Total	
Athlete	Horse	Event	Dressage		Cross-country			Qualifier			Final			Total	
Athlete	Horse	Event	Penalties	Rank	Penalties	Total	Rank	Penalties	Total	Rank	Penalties	Total	Rank	Penalties	Rank
Jeanette Brakewell	Over To You	Individual	49.80 #	28	4.00 #	53.80 #	23	4.00	57.80 #	18	Did not advance			57.80	18
William Fox-Pitt	Tamarillo	Individual	38.60	6	0.00	38.60	5	Withdrew			Did not advance				
Pippa Funnell	Primmore's Pride	Individual	31.40	2	11.20 #	42.60	8	0.00	42.60	3 Q	4.00	46.60	3	46.60	3rd place, bronze medalist(s)
Mary King	King Solomon III	Individual	48.00 #	=24	0.00	48.00 #	18	8.00 #	56.00	16 Q	18.00	74.00	20	74.00	20
Leslie Law	Shear l'Eau	Individual	43.20	10	1.20	44.40	11	0.00	44.40	4 Q	0.00	44.40	1st place, gold medalist(s)		
Jeanette Brakewell; William Fox-Pitt; Pippa Funnell; Mary King; Leslie Law	See above	Team	113.20	1	1.20	125.60	=3	4.00	143.00	2	—N/a			143.00	2nd place, silver medalist(s)

"#" indicates that the score of this rider does not count in the team competition, since only the best three results of a team are counted.

=== Show jumping ===
Athlete	Horse	Event	Qualification								Final					Total	
Athlete	Horse	Event	Round 1		Round 2			Round 3			Round A		Round B			Total	
Athlete	Horse	Event	Penalties	Rank	Penalties	Total	Rank	Penalties	Total	Rank	Penalties	Rank	Penalties	Total	Rank	Penalties	Rank
Nick Skelton	Arko III	Individual	1	=11	5	6	=13 Q	0	6	4 Q	0	=1 Q	13	13	=11	13	=11
Robert Smith	Mr Springfield	Individual	4	=19	8	12	=28 Q	9	21	=33 Q	8	=12 Q	4	12	=5	12	=4

== Fencing ==
Two British fencers qualified for the following events:

Men

Athlete	Event	Round of 64	Round of 32	Round of 16	Quarterfinal	Semi-final	Final / BM	
Athlete	Event	Opposition Score	Opposition Score	Opposition Score	Opposition Score	Opposition Score	Opposition Score	Rank
Richard Kruse	Individual foil	Bye	Wang Hb (CHN); W 15–11	Kellner (USA); W 15–14	Cassarà (ITA); L 8–15	Did not advance		

Women

Athlete	Event	Round of 32	Round of 16	Quarterfinal	Semi-final	Final / BM	
Athlete	Event	Opposition Score	Opposition Score	Opposition Score	Opposition Score	Opposition Score	Rank
Louise Bond-Williams	Individual sabre	König (GER); W 15–13	Nechaeva (RUS); L 12–15	Did not advance			

== Field hockey ==
=== Men's tournament ===
Roster

The following is the British roster in the men's field hockey tournament of the 2004 Summer Olympics.

Head coach: Jason Lee

1. Simon Mason (GK)
2. Jimi Lewis (GK)
5. Rob Moore
6. Craig Parnham
7. Niall Stott
8. Tom Bertram
9. Mark Pearn
10. Jimmy Wallis
11. Brett Garrard
12. Ben Hawes
13. Danny Hall
14. Mike Johnson
17. Guy Fordham
18. Barry Middleton
19. Graham Dunlop
22. Graham Moodie

Group play

Pos	Team	Pld	W	D	L	GF	GA	GD	Pts	Qualification
1	Spain	5	3	2	0	14	3	+11	11	Semi-finals
2	Germany	5	3	2	0	15	6	+9	11	Semi-finals
3	Pakistan	5	3	0	2	19	8	+11	9	5–8th place semi-finals
4	South Korea	5	2	2	1	17	8	+9	8	5–8th place semi-finals
5	Great Britain	5	1	0	4	9	21	−12	3	9–12th place semi-finals
6	Egypt	5	0	0	5	2	30	−28	0	9–12th place semi-finals

Source: FIH

15 August 2004
20:00

Great Britain	3–1	Egypt
Middleton 18'; Fordham 53'; Hawes 59'	Report	S. Mohamed 37'

Umpires:
Henrik Ehlers (DEN)
Satinder Kumar (IND)

17 August 2004
08:30

South Korea	3–2	Great Britain
Lee Jung-Seon 15', 68'; Yeo Woon-Kon 47'	Report	Hall 45'; Stott 52'

Umpires:
Pedro Teixeira (POR)
John Wright (RSA)

19 August 2004
18:30

Great Britain	1–5	Spain
Middleton 57'	Report	Amat 7', 38'; Freixa 32', 35'; Ribas 61'

Umpires:
Satinder Kumar (IND)
Christian Blasch (GER)

21 August 2004
20:30

Germany	4–1	Great Britain
Zeller 21', 39'; Witthaus 38'; Scharowsky 52'	Report	Moodie 60'

Umpires:
Jason McCracken (NZL)
Sumesh Putra (CAN)

23 August 2004
18:00

Pakistan	8–2	Great Britain
Abbas 9', 39'; Ali 35+'; Nadeem 37'; Butt 55', 68'; Abbasi 59'; Shabbir 60'	Report	Stott 5'; Hall 65'

Umpires:
Murray Grime (AUS)
Ray O'Connor (IRL)

9th–12th place Semi-final

25 August 2004
11:00

Great Britain	4–1	Argentina
Moore 24'; Bertram 35+'; Hall 38'; Pearn 67'	Report	Retegui 64'

Umpires:
Jason McCracken (NZL)
Christian Blasch (GER)

9th–10th place Final

27 August 2004
11:30

South Africa	1–1 (a.e.t.)	Great Britain
Nicol 45'	Report	Fordham 43'
Penalties
Symons (penalty shoot-out scored); Clark (penalty shoot-out scored); Nicol (penalty shoot-out scored); Denne (penalty shoot-out missed); Fulton (penalty shoot-out missed)	3–4	(penalty shoot-out scored) Hawes; (penalty shoot-out scored) Moodie; (penalty shoot-out missed) Stott; (penalty shoot-out scored) Garrard; (penalty shoot-out scored) Hall

Umpires:
David Gentles (AUS)
Amarjit Singh (MAS)

== Gymnastics ==
=== Artistic ===
Women
Team

Athlete	Event	Qualification						Final					
Athlete	Event	Apparatus				Total	Rank	Apparatus				Total	Rank
Athlete	Event	V	UB	BB	F	Total	Rank	V	UB	BB	F	Total	Rank
Cherrelle Fennell	Team	9.225	9.087	—N/a	9.012	—N/a		Did not advance					
Vanessa Hobbs	Team	9.237	8.437	8.937	9.087	35.698	44	Did not advance					
Katy Lennon	Team	9.237	8.850	9.025	9.125	36.237	28 Q	Did not advance					
Elizabeth Line	Team	—N/a		8.950	—N/a			Did not advance					
Beth Tweddle	Team	9.012	9.575	9.025	9.300	36.912	19 Q	Did not advance					
Nicola Willis	Team	9.025	8.937	7.625	9.175	34.762	53	Did not advance					
Total	Team	36.724	36.449	35.937	36.687	145.797	11	Did not advance					

Individual finals

Athlete	Event	Apparatus				Total	Rank
Athlete	Event	V	UB	BB	F	Total	Rank
Katy Lennon	All-around	9.262	8.987	8.200	8.925	35.374	21
Beth Tweddle	All-around	8.987	9.562	7.800	9.412	35.761	19

=== Rhythmic ===
Athlete	Event	Qualification						Final					
Athlete	Event	Hoop	Ball	Clubs	Ribbon	Total	Rank	Hoop	Ball	Clubs	Ribbon	Total	Rank
Hannah McKibbin	Individual	20.675	20.800	19.600	21.225	82.300	21	Did not advance					

=== Trampoline ===
Athlete	Event	Qualification		Final	
Athlete	Event	Score	Rank	Score	Rank
Gary Smith	Men's	67.20	7 Q	40.00	7
Kirsten Lawton	Women's	60.20	12	Did not advance	

== Judo ==
Eight British judoka (two men and six women) qualified for the 2004 Summer Olympics.

Men

Athlete	Event	Round of 32	Round of 16	Quarterfinals	Semi-finals	Repechage 1	Repechage 2	Repechage 3	Final / BM	
Athlete	Event	Opposition Result	Opposition Result	Opposition Result	Opposition Result	Opposition Result	Opposition Result	Opposition Result	Opposition Result	Rank
Craig Fallon	−60 kg	Fernandis (AUS); W 1000–0000	Zintiridis (GRE); L 0110–1010	Did not advance						
Winston Gordon	−90 kg	Kelly (AUS); W 1100–0000	Geraldino (DOM); W 1000–0001	Honorato (BRA); W 0012–0010	Zviadauri (GEO); L 0020–1000	Bye			Huizinga (NED); L 0000–1001	5

Women

Athlete	Event	Round of 32	Round of 16	Quarterfinals	Semi-finals	Repechage 1	Repechage 2	Repechage 3	Final / BM	
Athlete	Event	Opposition Result	Opposition Result	Opposition Result	Opposition Result	Opposition Result	Opposition Result	Opposition Result	Opposition Result	Rank
Georgina Singleton	−52 kg	Hukuda (BRA); W 1001–0000	Velázquez (VEN); W 0010–0000	Yokosawa (JPN); L 0000–1001	Did not advance	Bye	Ri S-S (PRK); W 0011–0010	Heylen (BEL); L 0000–0011	Did not advance	
Sophie Cox	−57 kg	Nasaudrodro (FIJ); W 1010–0000	Boukouvala (GRE); W 0001–0000	Kye S-H (PRK); L 0010–1010	Did not advance	Bye	Yukhareva (RUS); L 0000–1000	Did not advance		
Sarah Clark	−63 kg	Bye	Heill (AUT); L 0001–1001	Did not advance		Rousey (USA); L 0001–1000	Did not advance			
Kate Howey	−70 kg	Salayeva (TKM); W 1011–0000	Roberge (CAN); L 0001–0010	Did not advance						
Rachel Wilding	−78 kg	Bye	San Miguel (ESP); W 1011–0011	Matrosova (UKR); L 0000–1000	Did not advance	Bye	Lee S-Y (KOR); L 0000–0001	Did not advance		
Karina Bryant	+78 kg	Beltrán (CUB); L 0010–0030	Did not advance			Bvegadzi (CGO); W 1003–0000	Blanco (VEN); L 0020–0111	Did not advance		

== Modern pentathlon ==
Two British athletes qualified to compete in the modern pentathlon event through the European and UIPM World Championships.

Athlete	Event	Shooting (10 m air pistol)			Fencing (épée one touch)			Swimming (200 m freestyle)			Riding (show jumping)			Running (3000 m)			Total points	Final rank
Athlete	Event	Points	Rank	MP Points	Results	Rank	MP points	Time	Rank	MP points	Penalties	Rank	MP points	Time	Rank	MP Points	Total points	Final rank
Kate Allenby	Women's	169	19	964	21–10	=2	972	2:17.41	5	1272	196	25	1004	11:14.00	14	1024	5236	8
Georgina Harland	Women's	156	30	808	16–15	=12	832	2:14.60	2	1308	56	6	1144	10:17.31	1	1252	5344	3rd place, bronze medalist(s)

== Rowing ==
British rowers qualified the following boats:

Men

Athlete	Event	Heats		Repechage		Semi-finals		Final	
Athlete	Event	Time	Rank	Time	Rank	Time	Rank	Time	Rank
Ian Lawson	Single sculls	7:24.01	2 R	6:56.55	1 SA/B/C	6:57.55	3 FB	6:57.63	10
Rick Dunn; Toby Garbett	Pair	6:58.95	3 SA/B	Bye		6:25.06	4 FB	6:22.04	7
Matt Langridge; Matthew Wells	Double sculls	6:48.13	2 SA/B	Bye		6:13.71	4 FB	6:14.40	8
Ed Coode; James Cracknell; Matthew Pinsent; Steve Williams	Four	6:20.85	1 SA/B	Bye		5:50.44	1 FA	6:06.98	1st place, gold medalist(s)
Alan Campbell; Simon Cottle; Peter Gardner; Peter Wells	Quadruple sculls	5:54.69	4 R	5:48.65	3 SA/B	5:48.52	6 FB	6:07.87	12
Nick English; Mike Hennessy; Mark Hunter; Tim Male	Lightweight four	6:05.57	4 R	5:58.80	4	Did not advance			
Robin Bourne-Taylor; Christian Cormack (cox); Jonno Devlin; Dan Ouseley; Phil Simmons; Tom Stallard; Andrew Triggs Hodge; Josh West; Kieran West	Eight	5:32.26	4 R	5:34.37	3 FB	—N/a		5:53.31	9

Women

Athlete	Event	Heats		Repechage		Semi-finals		Final	
Athlete	Event	Time	Rank	Time	Rank	Time	Rank	Time	Rank
Cath Bishop; Katherine Grainger	Pair	7:34.66	2 R	7:06.75	1 FA	—N/a		7:08.66	2nd place, silver medalist(s)
Elise Laverick; Sarah Winckless	Double sculls	7:29.75	2 R	6:55.44	1 FA	—N/a		7:07.58	3rd place, bronze medalist(s)
Helen Casey; Tracy Langlands	Lightweight double sculls	6:59.19	4 R	6:59.63	2 SA/B	6:59.23	5 FB	7:29.12	9
Debbie Flood; Frances Houghton; Alison Mowbray; Rebecca Romero	Quadruple sculls	6:15.60	2 FA	Bye		—N/a		6:31.26	2nd place, silver medalist(s)

Qualification Legend: FA=Final A (medal); FB=Final B (non-medal); FC=Final C (non-medal); FD=Final D (non-medal); FE=Final E (non-medal); FF=Final F (non-medal); SA/B=Semifinals A/B; SC/D=Semifinals C/D; SE/F=Semifinals E/F; R=Repechage

== Sailing ==
British sailors qualified one boat for each of the following events.

Men

Athlete	Event	Race											Net points	Final rank
Athlete	Event	1	2	3	4	5	6	7	8	9	10	M*	Net points	Final rank
Nick Dempsey	Mistral	2	11	~~15~~	10	2	9	1	10	1	6	1	53	3rd place, bronze medalist(s)
Ben Ainslie	Finn	9	~~DSQ~~	1	1	4	1	2	3	2	1	14	38	1st place, gold medalist(s)
Jonathan Glanfield; Nick Rogers	470	2	3	9	4	17	5	2	3	10	19	~~22~~	74	2nd place, silver medalist(s)
Steve Mitchell; Iain Percy	Star	8	3	12	9	6	3	16	5	7	~~17~~	4	73	6

Women

Athlete	Event	Race											Net points	Final rank
Athlete	Event	1	2	3	4	5	6	7	8	9	10	M*	Net points	Final rank
Natasha Sturges	Mistral	~~16~~	10	3	9	9	14	12	11	15	11	9	103	9
Laura Baldwin	Europe	21	14	9	23	20	21	~~25~~	22	23	21	4	178	23
Christina Bassadone; Katherine Hopson	470	5	14	15	4	5	6	17	~~RAF~~	2	16	7	91	7
Sarah Ayton; Shirley Robertson; Sarah Webb	Yngling	5	4	1	1	4	3	4	6	3	8	~~DNS~~	39	1st place, gold medalist(s)

Open

Athlete	Event	Race																Net points	Final rank
Athlete	Event	1	2	3	4	5	6	7	8	9	10	11	12	13	14	15	M*	Net points	Final rank
Paul Goodison	Laser	13	3	~~28~~	5	11	7	1	9	8	7	—N/a					17	81	4
Chris Draper; Simon Hiscocks	49er	8	5	6	3	10	8	1	~~13~~	~~11~~	8	2	4	1	9	6	6	77	3rd place, bronze medalist(s)
Mark Bulkeley; Leigh McMillan	Tornado	8	14	~~17~~	12	7	14	8	3	16	15	—N/a					15	112	13

M = Medal race; OCS = On course side of the starting line; DSQ = Disqualified; DNF = Did not finish; DNS= Did not start; RDG = Redress given

== Shooting ==
Six British shooters (five men and one woman) qualified to compete in the following events:

Men

Athlete	Event	Qualification		Final	
Athlete	Event	Points	Rank	Points	Rank
Michael Babb	50 m rifle prone	595	6 Q	696.8	7
Richard Brickell	Skeet	115	=34	Did not advance	
Richard Faulds	Double trap	130	=13	Did not advance	
Edward Ling	Trap	113	=25	Did not advance	
Ian Peel	Trap	116	=19	Did not advance	

Women

Athlete	Event	Qualification		Final	
Athlete	Event	Points	Rank	Points	Rank
Sarah Gibbins	Trap	58	=9	Did not advance	

== Swimming ==
British swimmers earned qualifying standards in the following events (up to a maximum of 2 swimmers in each event at the A-standard time, and 1 at the B-standard time): All British swimmers must qualify by finishing in the top two of the Olympic trials having gained the GB qualifying A standard set by British Swimming in the relevant final (that time being the fastest time of the sixteenth fastest swimmer internationally in that event in 2003).

Men

Athlete	Event	Heat		Semi-final		Final	
Athlete	Event	Time	Rank	Time	Rank	Time	Rank
Simon Burnett	200 m freestyle	1:48.68	6 Q	1:47.72	6 Q	1:48.02	7
Chris Cook	200 m breaststroke	2:14.68	16 Q	2:15.91	15	Did not advance	
Todd Cooper	100 m butterfly	53.48	22	Did not advance			
David Davies	1500 m freestyle	14:57.03	1 Q	—N/a		14:45.95 NR	3rd place, bronze medalist(s)
Ian Edmond	200 m breaststroke	2:13.08	7 Q	DSQ		Did not advance	
Adam Faulkner	400 m freestyle	3:51.97	17	—N/a		Did not advance	
Robin Francis	200 m individual medley	2:01.57	12 Q	2:02.06	15	Did not advance	
Robin Francis	400 m individual medley	4:18.34	12	—N/a		Did not advance	
James Goddard	200 m backstroke	1:57.96	2 Q	1:57.25	2 Q	1:57.76	4
James Gibson	100 m breaststroke	1:00.99	5 Q	1:01.07	=4 Q	1:01.36	6
James Hickman	100 m butterfly	52.91	12 Q	53.10	15	Did not advance	
Matthew Kidd	100 m freestyle	49.97	23	Did not advance			
Darren Mew	100 m breaststroke	1:00.89	4 Q	1:00.83	3 Q	1:01.66	7
Stephen Parry	200 m butterfly	1:58.88	16 Q	1:55.57	1 Q	1:55.52	3rd place, bronze medalist(s)
Graeme Smith	400 m freestyle	3:52.41	20	—N/a		Did not advance	
Graeme Smith	1500 m freestyle	15:07.45	7 Q	—N/a		15:09.71	6
Graeme Smith	400 m individual medley	4:23.53	23	—N/a		Did not advance	
Gregor Tait	100 m backstroke	55.77	14 Q	55.31	12	Did not advance	
Gregor Tait	200 m backstroke	1:59.35	5 Q	1:58.75	5 Q	1:59.28	7
Adrian Turner	200 m individual medley	2:01.73	13 Q	2:03.85	16	Did not advance	
Simon Burnett; David Carry*; Ross Davenport; Gavin Meadows; David O'Brien	4 × 200 m freestyle relay	7:17.41	4 Q	—N/a		7:12.60	4
James Gibson; James Hickman; Matthew Kidd; Gregor Tait	4 × 100 m medley relay	3:36.94	3 Q	—N/a		3:38.21	8

* Competed only in heats

Women

Athlete	Event	Heat		Semi-final		Final	
Athlete	Event	Time	Rank	Time	Rank	Time	Rank
Kirsty Balfour	200 m breaststroke	2:29.78	11 Q	2:28.92	10	Did not advance	
Rebecca Cooke	400 m freestyle	4:08.18	5 Q	—N/a		4:11.35	8
Rebecca Cooke	800 m freestyle	8:28.47	2 Q	—N/a		8:29.37	6
Joanne Jackson	400 m freestyle	4:14.89	21	—N/a		Did not advance	
Georgina Lee	100 m butterfly	1:00.45	20	Did not advance			
Georgina Lee	200 m butterfly	2:10.99	6 Q	2:10.93	10	Did not advance	
Karen Lee	200 m backstroke	2:16.10	20	Did not advance			
Melanie Marshall	200 m freestyle	2:00.46	10 Q	2:01.06	16	Did not advance	
Sarah Price	100 m backstroke	1:02.17	14 Q	1:02.48	16	Did not advance	
Katy Sexton	100 m backstroke	1:02.01	12 Q	1:01.96	13	Did not advance	
Katy Sexton	200 m backstroke	2:13.25	8 Q	2:12.62	8 Q	2:12.11	7
Alison Sheppard	50 m freestyle	25.36	8 Q	25.36	12	Did not advance	
Lisa Chapman; Kathryn Evans; Melanie Marshall; Karen Pickering; Alison Sheppard*	4 × 100 m freestyle relay	3:41.96	6 Q	—N/a		3:40.82	6
Joanne Jackson*; Georgina Lee; Caitlin McClatchey; Melanie Marshall; Karen Pickering	4 × 200 m freestyle relay	8:01.77	2 Q	—N/a		7:59.11	5
Kirsty Balfour; Kathryn Evans; Georgina Lee; Melanie Marshall*; Sarah Price*; Katy Sexton	4 × 100 m medley relay	4:05.63	4 Q	—N/a		DSQ	

* Competed only in heats

== Taekwondo ==
Four British taekwondo jin qualified for the following events.

Athlete	Event	Round of 16	Quarterfinals	Semi-finals	Repechage 1	Repechage 2	Final / BM	
Athlete	Event	Opposition Result	Opposition Result	Opposition Result	Opposition Result	Opposition Result	Opposition Result	Rank
Paul Green	Men's −58 kg	Rahadhani (INA); W 6–5	Nguyen (VIE); L 2–4	Did not advance				
Craig Brown	Men's −80 kg	Trenton (AUS); L 6–12	Did not advance					
Sarah Bainbridge	Women's −67 kg	Sobers (NED); L 6–7	Did not advance					
Sarah Stevenson	Women's +67 kg	Carmona (VEN); L 8–8 SUP	Did not advance					

== Tennis ==
Great Britain had only a single tennis player that qualified automatically through their world ranking.

Athlete	Event	Round of 64	Round of 32	Round of 16	Quarterfinals	Semi-finals	Final / BM	
Athlete	Event	Opposition Score	Opposition Score	Opposition Score	Opposition Score	Opposition Score	Opposition Score	Rank
Tim Henman	Men's singles	Novák (CZE); L 3–6, 3–6	Did not advance					

== Triathlon ==
Six British triathletes qualified for the following events.

Athlete	Event	Swim (1.5 km)	Trans 1	Bike (40 km)	Trans 2	Run (10 km)	Total Time	Rank
Tim Don	Men's	18:07	0:18	1:01:40	0:20	34:55	1:54:42.13	18
Marc Jenkins	Men's	18:15	0:22	1:08:51	0:24	38:27	2:05:33.60	45
Andrew Johns	Men's	18:11	0:20	1:00:53	0:20	35:11	1:54:15.87	16
Julie Dibens	Women's	19:21	0:20	1:11:08	0:26	41:17	2:11:46.01	30
Michelle Dillon	Women's	20:37	0:21	1:09:50	0:25	35:33	2:06:00.77	6
Jodie Swallow	Women's	18:58	0:20	1:14:05	0:26	42:03	2:15:06.78	34

== Weightlifting ==
Two British weightlifters qualified for the following events:

Athlete	Event	Snatch		Clean & Jerk		Total	Rank
Athlete	Event	Result	Rank	Result	Rank	Total	Rank
Kamran Panjavi	Men's −62 kg	~~105.0~~	DNF	—	—	—	DNF
Michaela Breeze	Women's −58 kg	92.5	10	120	=7	212.5	9

== Wrestling ==
Key:

- VT – Victory by Fall.
- PP – Decision by Points – the loser with technical points.
- PO – Decision by Points – the loser without technical points.

Men's freestyle

Athlete	Event	Elimination Pool			Quarterfinal	Semi-final	Final / BM	
Athlete	Event	Opposition Result	Opposition Result	Rank	Opposition Result	Opposition Result	Opposition Result	Rank
Nate Ackerman	−74 kg	Gevorgyan (ARM); L 0–4 ^{ST}	Laliyev (KAZ); L 0–4 ^{ST}	3	Did not advance			19

== Media coverage ==
The main rights to Olympic coverage in the UK are held by the BBC, under the Ofcom Code on Sports and Other Listed and Designated Events. 2004 marked the first year that digital television and webcasts were used to cover an Olympic Games. The digital television service allowed up to five streamed channels covering the games, allowing more extensive coverage of minor sports, whilst the BBC's website permitted UK broadband users to view live streams from a variety of events, and other countries to view delayed highlights. Live broadcasts were run throughout the day, with a highlights program on BBC1 following the close of the day's events.

The BBC's coverage was anchored (at various times of the day) by Craig Doyle, Clare Balding, Suzi Perry, Sue Barker, Steve Rider, Hazel Irvine and Steve Cram. Expert analysts and commentators included Sharron Davies, Jonathan Edwards, Sally Gunnell, Michael Johnson, Colin Jackson, and Steve Redgrave.

Eurosport also ran coverage of the Games viewable in the UK – in accordance with the ITC Code, it can show live events, provided that such events can also be broadcast by the BBC (although the BBC can choose not to do so).

Radio coverage was provided by BBC Radio 5 Live and IRN, and the events were also covered by the sports pages of the major newspapers.

== See also ==
- Great Britain at the 2004 Summer Paralympics
