= Belgium at the 2004 Summer Olympics =

- IOC code: BEL
- NOC: Belgian Olympic and Interfederal Committee
- Website: www.teambelgium.be (in Dutch and French)

in Athens
- Competitors: 50 in 14 sports
- Flag bearer: Jean-Michel Saive
- Medals Ranked 51st: Gold 1 Silver 0 Bronze 2 Total 3

Summer Olympics appearances (overview)
- 1900; 1904; 1908; 1912; 1920; 1924; 1928; 1932; 1936; 1948; 1952; 1956; 1960; 1964; 1968; 1972; 1976; 1980; 1984; 1988; 1992; 1996; 2000; 2004; 2008; 2012; 2016; 2020; 2024; 2028

Other related appearances
- 1906 Intercalated Games

Belgium competed at the 2004 Summer Olympics in Athens, Greece. 50 competitors, 31 men and 19 women, took part in 41 events in 14 sports.

== Medalists ==
Medal	Name	Sport	Event	Date
Gold	Justine Henin	Tennis	Women's singles	August 21
Bronze	Axel Merckx	Cycling	Men's road race	August 14
Bronze	Ilse Heylen	Judo	Women's 52 kg	August 15

== Athletics ==
Belgian athletes have so far achieved qualifying standards in the following athletics events (up to a maximum of 3 athletes in each event at the 'A' Standard, and 1 at the 'B' Standard).

Key

- Note–Ranks given for track events are within the athlete's heat only
- Q = Qualified for the next round
- q = Qualified for the next round as a fastest loser or, in field events, by position without achieving the qualifying target
- NR = National record
- N/A = Round not applicable for the event
- Bye = Athlete not required to compete in round

Men
Track & road events

Athlete	Event	Heat		Semifinal		Final	
Athlete	Event	Result	Rank	Result	Rank	Result	Rank
Tom Compernolle	5000 m	13:43.44	14	—N/a		Did not advance	
Joeri Jansen	800 m	1:46.66	3	Did not advance			
Monder Rizki	5000 m	14:03.58	16	—N/a		Did not advance	
Cédric Van Branteghem	400 m	45.70	4 q	46.03	8	Did not advance	

Women
Track & road events

Athlete	Event	Heat		Quarterfinal		Semifinal		Final	
Athlete	Event	Result	Rank	Result	Rank	Result	Rank	Result	Rank
Kim Gevaert	100 m	11.18	3 Q	11.17	2 Q	11.40	17	Did not advance	
Kim Gevaert	200 m	22.76	2 Q	22.68	3 Q	22.48 NR	3 Q	22.84	6
Katleen De Caluwé; Kim Gevaert; Lien Huyghebaert; Élodie Ouédraogo	4 × 100 m relay	43.08 NR	3 Q	—N/a				43.11	6

Field events

Athlete	Event	Qualification		Final	
Athlete	Event	Distance	Position	Distance	Position
Tia Hellebaut	High jump	1.95	=4 Q	1.85	12

== Canoeing ==
=== Sprint ===
Athlete	Event	Heats		Semifinals		Final	
Athlete	Event	Time	Rank	Time	Rank	Time	Rank
Wouter d'Haene; Bob Maesen	Men's K-2 1000 m	3:14.447	4 q	3:11.757	1 Q	3:20.196	5
Petra Santy	Women's K-1 500 m	1:52.834	3 q	1:54.534	4	Did not advance	

Qualification Legend: Q = Qualify to final; q = Qualify to semifinal

== Cycling ==
=== Road ===
Men

Athlete	Event	Time	Rank
Philippe Gilbert	Road race	5:44:13	49
Axel Merckx	Road race	5:41:52	3rd place, bronze medalist(s)
Peter Van Petegem	Road race	5:42:03	40
Peter Van Petegem	Time trial	1:00:31.49	18
Wim Vansevenant	Road race	Did not finish	
Marc Wauters	Road race	Did not finish	
Marc Wauters	Time trial	59:59.63	13

Women

Athlete	Event	Time	Rank
Sharon Vandromme	Road race	3:25:42	21

=== Track ===
Omnium

Athlete	Event	Points	Laps	Rank
Matthew Gilmore	Men's points race	7	0	18
Matthew Gilmore; Iljo Keisse	Men's madison	3	−1	11

=== Mountain biking ===
Athlete	Event	Time	Rank
Roel Paulissen	Men's cross-country	2:18:10	4

== Equestrian ==
=== Eventing ===
Athlete	Horse	Event	Dressage		Cross-country			Jumping						Total	
Athlete	Horse	Event	Dressage		Cross-country			Qualifier			Final			Total	
Athlete	Horse	Event	Penalties	Rank	Penalties	Total	Rank	Penalties	Total	Rank	Penalties	Total	Rank	Penalties	Rank
Hendrik Degros	Mr. Noppus	Individual	63.80 #	54	18.40	82.20	46	0.00	82.20	37	Did not advance			82.20	37
Dolf Desmedt	Bold Action	Individual	57.00 #	38	31.20 #	88.20 #	53	4.00 #	92.20 #	43	Did not advance			92.20	43
Karin Donckers	Gormley	Individual	56.40	36	0.00	56.40	25	0.00	56.40	17 Q	8.00 #	64.40	16	64.40	16
Constantin Van Rijckevorsel	Withcote Nelie	Individual	48.00	25	6.40	54.40	19	0.00	54.40	15 Q	4.00	58.40	10	58.40	10
Joris Vanspringel	Over and Over	Individual	56.00	35	Eliminated			Did not advance							
Hendrik Degros; Dolf Desmedt; Karin Donckers; Constantin Van Rijckevorsel; Joris Vanspringel	See above	Team	160.40	7	24.80	193.00	8	0.00	193.00	1	—N/a			193.00	7

"#" indicates that the score of this rider does not count in the team competition, since only the best three results of a team are counted.

=== Show jumping ===
Athlete	Horse	Event	Qualification								Final					Total	
Athlete	Horse	Event	Round 1		Round 2			Round 3			Round A		Round B			Total	
Athlete	Horse	Event	Penalties	Rank	Penalties	Total	Rank	Penalties	Total	Rank	Penalties	Rank	Penalties	Total	Rank	Penalties	Rank
Dirk Demeersman	Clinton	Individual	12	=60	0	12	=28 Q	8	20	=29 Q	8	=12 Q	4	12	=4	12	=4
Jos Lansink	Cumano	Individual	4	=19	13	17	=42 Q	0	17	=21 Q	12	30	Did not advance			12	30
Ludo Philippaerts	Parco	Individual	0	=1	4	4	=5 Q	16	20	=29 Q	4	=4 Q	8	12	=4	12	=4
Stany Van Paesschen	O de Pomme	Individual	4	=19	8	12	=28 Q	8	20	=29	Did not advance						
Dirk Demeersman; Jos Lansink; Ludo Philippaerts; Stany Van Paesschen	See above	Team	—N/a								12	=4 Q	16	28	6	28	6

== Fencing ==
Men

Athlete	Event	Round of 64	Round of 32	Round of 16	Quarterfinal	Semifinal	Final / BM	
Athlete	Event	Opposition Score	Opposition Score	Opposition Score	Opposition Score	Opposition Score	Opposition Score	Rank
Cédric Gohy	Individual foil	Bye	Kellner (USA); L 12–15	Did not advance				

== Gymnastics ==
=== Artistic ===
Women

Athlete	Event	Qualification						Final					
Athlete	Event	Apparatus				Total	Rank	Apparatus				Total	Rank
Athlete	Event	V	UB	BB	F	Total	Rank	V	UB	BB	F	Total	Rank
Aagje Vanwalleghem	All-around	9.275	9.200	8.825	8.925	36.225	29 Q	9.225	9.075	8.287	8.275	34.862	23

== Judo ==
Women

Athlete	Event	Round of 32	Round of 16	Quarterfinals	Semifinals	Repechage 1	Repechage 2	Repechage 3	Final / BM	
Athlete	Event	Opposition Result	Opposition Result	Opposition Result	Opposition Result	Opposition Result	Opposition Result	Opposition Result	Opposition Result	Rank
Ilse Heylen	−52 kg	Ravaoarisoa (MAD); W 0200–0000	Kaliyeva (KAZ); W 1000–0000	Savón (CUB); L 0000–0101	Did not advance	Bye	Askelöf (SWE); W 0201–0000	Singleton (GBR); W 0011–0000	Euranie (FRA); W 0001–0000	3rd place, bronze medalist(s)
Gella Vandecaveye	−63 kg	Ishii (BRA); W 1000–0000	Tampasi (GRE); W 1020–0000	Žolnir (SLO); L 0001–1001	Did not advance	Bye	González (CUB); L 0000–1000	Did not advance		
Catherine Jacques	−70 kg	Kim M-J (KOR); W 0011–0010	Liu S-Y (TPE); W 0220–0010	Ueno (JPN); L0000–1000	Did not advance	Bye	Sraka (SLO); W 0200–0000	Kim R-M (PRK); W 0110–0030	Böhm (GER); L 0000–1000	5

== Rowing ==
Men

Athlete	Event	Heats		Repechage		Semifinals		Final	
Athlete	Event	Time	Rank	Time	Rank	Time	Rank	Time	Rank
Tim Maeyens	Single sculls	7:17.68	1 SA/B/C	Bye		6:50:33	2 FA	7:01:74	6
Justin Gevaert; Wouter Van der Fraenen	Lightweight double sculls	6:26.25	4 R	6:31:18	3 SC/D	6:25:34	2 FC	6:59:07	15

Qualification Legend: FA=Final A (medal); FB=Final B (non-medal); FC=Final C (non-medal); FD=Final D (non-medal); FE=Final E (non-medal); FF=Final F (non-medal); SA/B=Semifinals A/B; SC/D=Semifinals C/D; SE/F=Semifinals E/F; R=Repechage

== Sailing ==
Men

Athlete	Event	Race											Net points	Final rank
Athlete	Event	1	2	3	4	5	6	7	8	9	10	M*	Net points	Final rank
Sébastien Godefroid	Finn	19	12	2	5	6	5	3	11	~~24~~	18	15	96	7

Women

Athlete	Event	Race											Net points	Final rank
Athlete	Event	1	2	3	4	5	6	7	8	9	10	M*	Net points	Final rank
Sigrid Rondelez	Mistral	17	7	19	14	15	18	18	~~21~~	13	12	15	148	18
Min Dezillie	Europe	13	1	20	3	16	~~DNF~~	19	20	2	23	16	133	15

Open

Athlete	Event	Race											Net points	Final rank
Athlete	Event	1	2	3	4	5	6	7	8	9	10	M*	Net points	Final rank
Philippe Bergmans	Laser	9	4	5	14	~~32~~	14	17	27	20	18	31	159	18

M = Medal race; OCS = On course side of the starting line; DSQ = Disqualified; DNF = Did not finish; DNS= Did not start; RDG = Redress given

== Shooting ==
Women

Athlete	Event	Qualification		Final	
Athlete	Event	Points	Rank	Points	Rank
Daisy de Bock	10 m air rifle	388	33	Did not advance	

== Table tennis ==
Athlete	Event	Round 1	Round 2	Round 3	Round 4	Quarterfinals	Semifinals	Final / BM	
Athlete	Event	Opposition Result	Opposition Result	Opposition Result	Opposition Result	Opposition Result	Opposition Result	Opposition Result	Rank
Jean-Michel Saive	Men's singles	Bye		Lin (DOM); L 2–4	Did not advance				

== Taekwondo ==
Athlete	Event	Round of 16	Quarterfinals	Semifinals	Repechage 1	Repechage 2	Final / BM	
Athlete	Event	Opposition Result	Opposition Result	Opposition Result	Opposition Result	Opposition Result	Opposition Result	Rank
Laurence Rase	Women's +67 kg	Mikryukova (UZB); W 9–6	Falavigna (BRA); L 4–8	Did not advance				

== Tennis ==
Athlete	Event	Round of 64	Round of 32	Round of 16	Quarterfinals	Semifinals	Final / BM	
Athlete	Event	Opposition Score	Opposition Score	Opposition Score	Opposition Score	Opposition Score	Opposition Score	Rank
Xavier Malisse	Men's singles	Youzhny (RUS); L 2–6, 2–6	Did not advance					
Olivier Rochus	Men's singles	Philippoussis (AUS); W 3–6, 6–0, 6–1	Moyá (ESP); L 0–6, 6–7^{(3–7)}	Did not advance				
Xavier Malisse; Olivier Rochus	Men's doubles	—N/a	Llodra / Santoro (FRA); L 3–6, 2–6	Did not advance				
Justine Henin	Women's singles	Strýcová (CZE); W 6–3, 6–4	Vento-Kabchi (VEN); W 6–2, 6–1	Pratt (AUS); W 6–1, 6–0	Pierce (FRA); W 6–4, 6–4	Myskina (RUS); W 7–5, 5–7, 8–6	Mauresmo (FRA); W 6–3, 6–3	1st place, gold medalist(s)

== Triathlon ==
The same two women competed for Belgium that did four years earlier. Both did better in 2004 than they had in the first competition, with Kathleen Smet missing a medal by only 27 seconds.

Athlete	Event	Swim (1.5 km)	Trans 1	Bike (40 km)	Trans 2	Run (10 km)	Total Time	Rank
Kathleen Smet	Women's	19:42	0:21	1:09:25	0:23	36:28	2:05:35.89	4
Mieke Suys	Women's	20:26	0:20	1:09:59	0:22	38:47	2:09:12.57	22

== See also ==
- Belgium at the 2004 Summer Paralympics
