= Swimming at the 2000 Commonwealth Youth Games =

Swimming at the I Commonwealth Youth Games
- Host city: Edinburgh
- Date: 10-14 August
- Venue: Royal Commonwealth Pool

At the 2000 Commonwealth Youth Games, the Swimming events were held at the Royal Commonwealth Pool in Edinburgh, Scotland from 10 to 14 August. A near full programme of swimming events were held during the games.

== Results ==
=== Medal table ===
* Host nation ( SCO)

Rank	Nation	Gold	Silver	Bronze	Total
1	AUS	25	4	2	31
2	ENG	4	19	7	30
3	RSA	3	6	15	24
4	SCO*	0	3	8	11
Totals (4 entries)		32	32	32	96

=== Boys' events ===
Event	Gold		Silver		Bronze	
50 m freestyle	Chris Cozens; England	23.72 GR	Ashley Anderson; Australia	23.80	Nick Tozer; South Africa	24.23
100 m freestyle	Raymond McDonald; Australia	52.10 GR	Chris Cozens; England	52.84	Nick Tozer; South Africa	53.44
200 m freestyle	Byron Jeffers; South Africa	1:54.62 GR	Seth Chappels; England	1:55.11	Joshua Krogh; Australia	1:55.27
400 m freestyle	Joshua Krogh; Australia	4:00.79 GR	George du Rand; South Africa	4:04.94	Nick Baker; England	4:09.76
1500 m freestyle	Stephen Penfold; Australia	15:27.40 GR	Nick Baker; England	16:16.83	Chris Whitcombe; Scotland	16:25.13
50 m backstroke						
100 m backstroke	Gerhard Zandberg; South Africa	57.76 GR	Leigh McBean; Australia	57.98	David O'Brien; England	58.75
200 m backstroke	Leigh McBean; Australia	2:04.05 GR	David O'Brien; England	2:04.93	George du Rand; South Africa	2:07.84
50 m breaststroke						
100 m breaststroke	Mark Riley; Australia	1:05.25 GR	Christopher Tidey; England	1:05.30	Michiel du Toit; South Africa	1:06.32
200 m breaststroke	Mark Riley; Australia	2:11.15 GR	Christopher Tidey; England	2:21.62	Michiel du Toit; South Africa	2:23,62
50 m butterfly						
100 m butterfly	Joshua Krogh; Australia	54.91 GR	Todd Cooper; Scotland	57.66	Werner Verster; South Africa	57.84
200 m butterfly	Joshua Krogh; Australia	2:00.51 GR	Raazik Nordien; South Africa	2:03.93	Todd Cooper; Scotland	2:08.67
200 m individual medley	James Goddard; England	2:07.73 GR	Ashley Anderson; Australia	2:10.56	Robert Lee; Scotland	2:12.67
400 m individual medley	Joshua Krogh; Australia	4:31.14 GR	George du Rand; South Africa	4:31.92	James Goddard; England	4:36.16
4×100 m freestyle relay	Australia; Australia; Raymond MacDonald; Ashley Anderson; Joshua Krogh; Leigh McBean	3:27.89 GR	South Africa; South Africa; Nick Tozer; George du Rand; Raazik Nordien; Byron Jeffers	3:31.62	England; England; Chris Cozens; James Goddard; Christopher Tidey; Seth Chappels	3:32.57
4×200 m freestyle relay	Australia; Australia; Joshua Krogh; Ashley Anderson; Raymond MacDonald; Leigh McBean	7:34.66 GR	England; England; Seth Chappels; James Goddard; Chris Cozens; Christopher Tidey	7:45.27	South Africa; South Africa; Byron Jeffers; George du Rand; Raazik Nordien; Nick Tozer	8:11.04
4×100 m medley relay	Australia; Australia; Raymond MacDonald; Mark Riley; Joshua Krogh; Leigh McBean	3:47.81 GR	South Africa; South Africa; Nick Tozer; Michiel du Toit; Werner Vester; George du Rand	3:53.57	England; England; Chris Cozens; Christopher Tidey; James Goddard; David O'Brien	3:58.33

=== Girls' events ===
Event	Gold		Silver		Bronze	
50 m freestyle	Jodie Henry; Australia	26.18 GR	Lisa Chapman; England	26.74	Rowena Cornish; Scotland	28.13
100 m freestyle	Jodie Henry; Australia	56.67 GR	Charlotte Dallas; England	58.03	Melanie Greyling; South Africa	59.76
200 m freestyle	Charlotte Dallas; England	2:02.57 GR	Kate Krywulycz; Australia	2:02.89	Marizanne Grundling; South Africa	2:06.46
400 m freestyle	Linda McKenzie; Australia	4:20.75 GR	Nathalie Brown; England	4:22.68	Nicola Stanley; South Africa	4:32.32
800 m freestyle	Katie Canning; Australia	8:49.27 GR	Nathalie Brown; England	8:49.36	Natalie Du Toit; South Africa	9:17.13
50 m backstroke						
100 m backstroke	Julie Fort; England	1:04.55 GR	Remy Altmann; South Africa	1:05.00	Alissa Searston; Australia	1:05.34
200 m backstroke	Alissa Searston; Australia	2:17.43 GR	Louise Coull; Scotland	2:18.91	Julie Fort; England	2:18.91
50 m breaststroke						
100 m breaststroke	Kelli Waite; Australia	1:10.56 GR	Kirsty Balfour; Scotland	1:11.78	Charlotte Evans; England	1:13.31
200 m breaststroke	Kelli Waite; Australia	2:28.81 GR	Charlotte Evans; England	2:36.09	Kirsty Balfour; Scotland	2:37.29
50 m butterfly						
100 m butterfly	Linda McKenzie; Australia	1:02.52 GR	Caroline Smart; England	1:04.12	Natalie Du Toit; South Africa	1:04.94
200 m butterfly	Nicole Hunter; Australia	2:15.08 GR	Caroline Smart; England	2:19.63	Laura McGarvey; Scotland	2:24.39
200 m individual medley	Katie Canning; Australia	2:20.12 GR	Nathalie Brown; England	2:21.16	Natalie Du Toit; South Africa	2:24.74
400 m individual medley	Natalie Du Toit; South Africa	2:20.12 GR	Lisa Chapman; England	2:21.16	Samantha Hunter; Scotland	2.22.74
4×100 m freestyle relay	Australia; Australia; Kelli Waite; Jodie Henry; Linda McKenzie; Kate Krywulycz	3:51.36 GR	England; England; Charlotte Evans; Nathalie Brown; Lisa Chapman; Charlotte Dallas	3:58.09	South Africa; South Africa; Natalie du Toit; Melanie Greyling; Marizanne Grundling; Nicola Stanley	4:02.83
4×200 m freestyle relay	Australia; Australia; Kelli Waite; Jodie Henry; Kate Krywulycz; Alissa Searston	8:16.93 GR	England; England; Charlotte Evans; Nathalie Brown; Lisa Chapman; Charlotte Dallas	8:29.27	South Africa; South Africa; Natalie du Toit; Melanie Greyling; Marizanne Grundling; Nicola Stanley	8:45.68
4×100 m medley relay	Australia; Australia; Kelli Waite; Jodie Henry; Linda McKenzie; Alissa Searston	4:15.41 GR	England; England; Charlotte Evans; Caroline Smart; Julie Fort; Charlotte Dallas	4:23.92	Scotland; Scotland; Louise Coull; Kirsty Balfour; Laura McGarvey; Carey Abel	4:23.94
