= Ri Sang-sim =

Olympic judoka

Personal information
- Nationality: North Korea
- Born: 10 October 1979 (age 46) Pyongyang, North Korea
- Height: 1.59 m (5 ft 2 1/2 in)
- Weight: 52 kg (115 lb)

Sport
- Sport: Judo
- Event: 52 kg

Korean name
- Hangul: 리상심
- RR: Ri Sangsim
- MR: Ri Sangsim

Ri Sang-sim (Korean: 리상심; born October 10, 1979, in Pyongyang) is a North Korean judoka who competed in the women's half-lightweight category. She finished fifth in the 52-kg division at the 2003 World Judo Championships in Osaka, Japan, and also represented her nation North Korea at the 2004 Summer Olympics.

Ri qualified for the North Korean squad in the women's half-lightweight class (52 kg) at the 2004 Summer Olympics in Athens, by placing third and granting a berth from the A-Tournament in Tallinn, Estonia. She lost her opening match to Japanese judoka and eventual silver medalist Yuki Yokosawa who scored an ippon victory and pulverized her with a tate shiho gatame (vertical four-quarter hold) at two minutes and twenty-seven seconds. In the repechage, Ri gave herself a chance for an Olympic bronze medal by taking a two-point advantage on yuko against Senegal's Hortense Diédhiou, but came to a halt with a loss on points and an uchi mata makikomi (inner thigh wraparound) hold to British judoka and 2002 Commonwealth Games champion Georgina Singleton.
