= Raffaella Imbriani =

German judoka (born 1973)

Personal information
- Born: 24 January 1973 (age 53) Karlsruhe, Baden-Württemberg, West Germany
- Occupation: Judoka
- Height: 1.58 m (5 ft 2 in)

Sport
- Country: Germany
- Sport: Judo
- Weight class: ‍–‍52 kg
- Club: Judo League Brandenburg
- Coached by: Wolfgang Zuckschwerdt

Achievements and titles
- Olympic Games: 9th (2004)
- World Champ.: (silver) (2001)
- European Champ.: (gold) (1998)
Medal record
Women's judo
Representing Germany
World Championships
Silver medal – second place	2001 Munich	‍–‍52 kg
Bronze medal – third place	2003 Osaka	‍–‍52 kg
European Championships
Gold medal – first place	1998 Oviedo	‍–‍52 kg
Bronze medal – third place	1999 Bratislava	‍–‍52 kg
European Junior Championships
Bronze medal – third place	1991 Pieksämäki	‍–‍52 kg

Profile at external databases
- IJF: 52940
- JudoInside.com: 244
- Updated on 19 November 2022

Raffaella Imbriani (born 24 January 1973 in Karlsruhe, Baden-Württemberg) is a German judoka who competed in the women's half-lightweight category. She held five German senior titles in her own division, picked up a total of thirty-five medals in her career, including four from major international tournaments (European and World Championships), and represented Germany in the 52-kg class at the 2004 Summer Olympics. Imbriani also trained for Judo Club Ettlingen and then Judo League in Brandenburg under her personal coach and sensei Wolfgang Zuckschwerdt.

Imbriani reached the pinnacle of her sporting career at the 2001 World Judo Championships in Munich, where she picked up a silver in the 52-kg division, losing to North Korean judoka and 1996 Olympic champion Kye Sun-hui in front of her home crowd. Two years later, she shared bronze medals with Japan's Yuki Yokosawa in the same division at the 2003 World Judo Championships in Osaka, Japan, which guaranteed her a spot on the German judo squad for her major Olympic debut.

At the 2004 Summer Olympics in Athens, Imbriani qualified for the German squad in the women's half-lightweight class (52 kg), by placing third at the World Championships in Osaka, Japan. Imbriani got off to a firm start with convincing victories over U.S. judoka Charlee Minkin and the host nation Greece's Maria Tselaridou in the prelims, before she succumbed to a waza-ari awasete ippon hold from China's Xian Dongmei with only forty-five seconds in the time limit during their quarterfinal match. Imbriani gave herself a chance for an Olympic bronze medal in the repechage round, but fell short to Algeria's Salima Souakri, who threw her off the tatami with a solid grip and a waza-ari hold forty seconds before their match ended.
