= The Brandeis School of San Francisco =

Location
- 655 Brotherhood Way; San Francisco, California 94132; United States; 37.7131135°N 122.4758998°W

Information
- Type: Private
- Religious affiliation: Jewish
- Established: 1963
- Founder: Rabbi Saul White
- Head of school: Dr. Dan Glass
- Grades: Kindergarten-8
- Gender: Co-educational
- Enrollment: 360 (2026-2027)
- Colors: Blue and white
- Team name: Lions
- Core Values: Kindness, Integrity, & Service
- Director of Admissions: Angie Dalfen
- Athletics Director: Corrie Mizusawa
- Director of Jewish Learning: Rabbi Genevieve Greinetz
- Interim Director of Lower School: Sarah Rhee
- Director of Middle School: Dr. Sivan Tarle
- Website: http://www.sfbrandeis.org

The Brandeis School of San Francisco, or Brandeis for short, is an independent, co-educational, Jewish day school for students in kindergarten through eighth grade, located in the Park Merced neighborhood of San Francisco, California, United States. From its founding in 1963 until 1973, the school was known as Brandeis. Following the merge with the Hillel School, the school was known as Brandeis Hillel Day School. As of July 1, 2015, the San Francisco campus of the former Brandeis Hillel Day School is now The Brandeis School of San Francisco.

The school is a member of the California Association of Independent Schools.

== History ==
Brandeis was founded in 1963 by Frances Sussna with support from Rabbi Saul E. White of Congregation Beth Sholom (San Francisco, California) and named after Jewish US Supreme Court Justice Louis Brandeis. In 1973, Brandeis merged with the Hillel School and became known as Brandeis Hillel Day School (BHDS), and in 1983 BHDS moved to its present location on Brotherhood Way. The school was designed by architect Robert Marquis. In 1978, Brandeis Hillel Day School opened a second campus in San Rafael, California. In 2014, the Brandeis Hillel Day School Board of Trustees approved the creation of two separate independent schools. As of July 1, 2015, the San Francisco campus is now The Brandeis School of San Francisco.

== Facilities ==
In addition to lower school and middle school classrooms, Brandeis has a cutting-edge science center, an art studio, a regulation-size gymnasium, and large outdoor athletics and play areas. In 2002, Brandeis completed the newest building, the mercaz, a $10 million, 24,200 square foot building which houses the kindergarten through third grade classrooms; administrative offices; a 2,800 square foot media resource center and library; an acoustically-designed music room; and beit midrash (used for weekly tefillah). In summer 2026, the school broke ground on renovations for the bluetop play space and cafeteria, as part of their $13 million dollar capital plan.

== Athletics ==
Brandeis offers athletics opportunities in cross country, soccer, basketball, volleyball, and track and field for boys and girls in fifth through eighth grades. The school participates in the Bay Area Interscholastic Athletic League (BAIAL) with other Bay Area independent schools. In some sports, Brandeis participates in the Catholic Youth Organization.

== Student Community Board ==
Every year, the middle school Student Community Board (SCB) holds elections for the executive board. Positions up for election are co-presidents, recorder, treasurer, and Jewish voice. In addition to the executive board, each middle school advisory group (of which there are 12) selects a representative for SCB. The SCB helps plan the school dance, runs the school store, and represents the student body.

The annual basketball tournament is hosted by SCB to raise money for tzedakah. Teams of middle school students face off against each other all week. The winning team competes against a team of faculty and staff during a Friday afternoon event attended by the entire school. The money raised from the tournament and all proceeds from the school store on the day of the students vs. faculty/staff basketball game are donated to a cause selected by the middle school students.

In previous years the SCB ran a penny war where the winning advisory selected where the money was donated. Money raised during the 2014–15 penny war was donated to Develop Africa.

== Sukkot in Yosemite ==
Beginning in 2001 and occurring every three years, Brandeis hosts Sukkot in Yosemite National Park. Hundreds of members of the community come together to celebrate the holiday of Sukkot. The event takes place in October.

== The Opposite of Spoiled ==
In February 2015, The New York Times' personal finance columnist Ron Lieber published the book The Opposite of Spoiled: Raising Kids Who Are Grounded, Generous, and Smart about Money. The book features a section about Brandeis and the school's seventh grade Tzedek Fund. When interviewed about the book, Lieber said, "I visited the Seventh Grade Philanthropy Fund [at Brandeis Hillel Day School in the San Francisco Bay Area] and it was completely inspiring. In addition to giving 13 year olds adult responsibilities and seeing them rise to the occasion and evaluating adults that come to them for money, it's a lesson for tradeoff: Who is most in need? Who are we to make that decision? What do we need to know about the world in order to make a good choice? It's so spectacular in so many ways."

== Notable students ==
- Charlee Minkin (born 1981), Olympic judoka
- Rafael Mandelman, Member of San Francisco Board of Supervisors
