= M'mah Soumah =

Guinean judoka

Personal information
- Full name: M'mah Soumah
- Nationality: Guinean
- Born: 10 May 1985 (age 41) Conakry, Guinea
- Occupation: Judoka
- Height: 1.68 m (5 ft 6 in)
- Weight: 52 kg (115 lb)

Sport
- Sport: Judo
- Event: 52 kg

Profile at external databases
- JudoInside.com: 32672

M'mah Soumah (born 10 May 1985 in Conakry) is a Guinean judoka who competed in the women's half-lightweight category. She picked up a bronze medal in the 52-kg division at the 2004 African Judo Championships in Tunis, Tunisia, and represented her nation Guinea at the 2004 Summer Olympics.

Soumah qualified as a lone female athlete and judoka for the Guinean squad in the women's half-lightweight class (52 kg) at the 2004 Summer Olympics in Athens, by granting a tripartite invitation from the International Judo Federation. She lost her opening match to Portugal's Telma Monteiro, who scored an ippon victory and quickly subdued her on the tatami with a seoi nage (shoulder throw) at eighteen seconds.
