= Rochelle Stormont =

New Zealand judoka

Personal information
- Full name: Rochelle Anne Stormont
- Nationality: New Zealand
- Born: 21 July 1982 (age 44) Pukekohe, Auckland, New; Zealand
- Occupation: Judoka
- Height: 1.57 m (5 ft 2 in)
- Weight: 52 kg (115 lb)

Sport
- Sport: Judo
- Event: 52 kg

Profile at external databases
- JudoInside.com: 15211

Rochelle Anne Stormont (born 21 July 1982) is a New Zealand judoka who competed in the women's half-lightweight category. She held five New Zealand senior titles in her division between 1997 and 2004, picked up a total of seven medals in her career, and represented her nation New Zealand in the 52-kg class at the 2004 Summer Olympics.

Stormont qualified as a lone judoka for the New Zealand squad in the women's half-lightweight class (52 kg) at the 2004 Summer Olympics in Athens, by topping the field and granting a berth from the Oceania Championships in Nouméa, New Caledonia. She lost her opening match to Romania's highly ranked judoka Ioana Maria Aluaş, who scored an ippon victory and quickly subdued her on the tatami with an ura nage (rear throw) at thirty-four seconds.
