= Congregation Am Tikvah =

Reform synagogue in San Francisco, California

- Location in San Francisco Bay Area, California

Religion
- Affiliation: Judaism
- Rite: Conservative and Reform
- Ecclesiastical or organizational status: Synagogue
- Leadership: Rabbi Chayva Lehrman
- Status: Active

Location
- Location: 625 Brotherhood Way, San Francisco, California 94132
- Country: United States
- Interactive map of Congregation Am Tikvah
- Coordinates: 37°42′49″N 122°28′29″W

Architecture
- Type: Synagogue architecture
- Established: 2021 (merged congregation) – 1949: B’nai Emunah – 1969: Beth Israel-Judea: 1860 (as Beth Israel); 1953 (as Temple Judea)
- Completed: 1879 (BI: Turk Street); 1891 (BI: Geary Street #1); 1908 (BI: Geary Street #2); 1964 (TJ: Brotherhood Way); 1976 (BE: Taraval Street)

Website
- amtikvah.org

Congregation Am Tikvah ('People of Hope') is a combined Conservative and Reform Jewish congregation and synagogue located at 625 Brotherhood Way in San Francisco, California, in the United States. The congregation was formed in 2021 as the result of the merger of the Conservative B'nai Emunah and the Reform Beth Israel Judea congregations, with the latter formed in 1969 through a merger of the Conservative Congregation Beth Israel and the Reform Temple Judea. The congregation is affiliated with both the Union for Reform Judaism and the United Synagogue of Conservative Judaism.

Beth Israel was founded in 1860 as an Orthodox congregation. Members worshiped in leased premises, first on Sutter Street, and then a larger space on Mission Street. In 1879 the congregation completed its first building on Turk Street, but soon outgrew it, and in 1891 constructed a new synagogue building on Geary Street. In 1908 it constructed a larger synagogue building on Geary Street, where it remained until 1969. By this time the congregation had moved to Conservative Judaism. The congregation's rabbis were M. Wolf (1860–1874), A. (Nahum) Streisand (1874–1878), Aron J. Messing (1878–1890), Meyer Solomon Levy (1890–1916), Herman Lissauer (1916–1926), and Elliot M. Burstein (1927–1969). Joseph Rabinowitz was cantor from 1891 to 1943.

B'nai Emunah was founded in 1949 by mostly German Jews who had fled to Shanghai in the late 1930s. After World War II, some of the Shanghai Jews settled in San Francisco.

Temple Judea was founded in 1953, the first Reform synagogue built in San Francisco in almost 125 years. Its first rabbi was Robert W. Shapiro, and he was succeeded by Irving Reichert and then Herbert Morris in 1962. In 1964 Temple Judea completed a synagogue building at 625 Brotherhood Way.

Beth Israel and Temple Judea merged in 1969 as Congregation Beth Israel-Judea, adopting practices from both congregations, and moving to Temple Judea's building. Morris became the rabbi of the combined congregation, and Burstein became rabbi emeritus. Morris retired in 1998, was succeeded by Evan Goodman. Goodman left in 2006, and was succeeded by Rosalind Glazer.

Beth Israel-Judea and B'nai Emunah congregations merged in 2021, affiliating with both the Conservative and Reform organizations and worshiping in the former Beth Israel-Judea synagogue building, located on Brotherhood Way. Rabbi Sami Barth was appointed as interim rabbi during the merger; and, in 2023, Rabbi Chayva Lehrman was appointed to lead the merged congregation.

== Early history ==
=== Congregation Beth Israel ===
==== Early premises ====
Congregation Beth Israel was founded as an Orthodox synagogue in San Francisco in 1860, and subsequently became "the first conservative congregation west of Chicago". From 1860 to 1874 the congregation worshiped in a leased building on Sutter Street between Dupont and Stockton Streets. During this period the rabbi was M. Wolf. Beth Israel then leased a larger building on Mission Street, between Fifth and Sixth Streets for four years, led by A. (Nachum/Nahum) Streisand. Born in Posen in 1819, Streisand had been a student of Akiva Eiger, and had served as a maggid (itinerant preacher) in Ukraine and in Posen. In 1869, he emigrated to the United States, where he served as rabbi of New York City's (then) Orthodox Congregation Shaare Zedek. He moved from New York to San Francisco in 1874 to take the position of rabbi at Beth Israel. Streisand was succeeded by Aron J. Messing in 1877 or 1878, (Note: Streisand served until 1878, and was succeeded that year by Messing. Messing served at Beth Israel from 1877 to 1890. Also, described as 'Rabbi Congregation "Beth Israel"'.) and died in San Francisco in January 1879.

Messing was also born in Posen, in 1839 or 1840, and studied divinity at the University of Graz. He emigrated to the United States in 1866, to serve as rabbi of New York City's Beth Israel Bikur Cholim. (Note: Messing first moved to Chicago.) In 1870 he moved to San Francisco's Congregation Sherith Israel, but could not convince the members to become Orthodox, and returned to Chicago three years later. He returned to San Francisco to serve at the then-Orthodox Beth Israel. When he joined Beth Israel, it had eighty member families, and within a year that had more than doubled. Beth Israel was considered a "Polish" congregation at the time, but had many German-Jewish members, and Messing gave his sermons in German.

Though services were traditional, the congregation instituted "strict rules of decorum", which were given in some detail in its 1878 constitution. These included prohibitions against gathering outside the sanctuary, talking during services, entering or leaving at various times during the services, praying out loud or with "all manner of intonations", wearing the tallit over the head, taking off the tallit before the end of services, or bringing in children under 6 years of age. The constitution also detailed exactly when congregants had to stand during the services.

To accommodate continued growth, the congregation built its first synagogue on Turk Street between Jones and Taylor Streets, and dedicated it in 1879. The congregation outgrew the Turk Street building and, in 1891, built a new synagogue at 1411 Geary Street, near Octavia.

==== Geary Street ====
Messing had served as rabbi until 1890, and was succeeded that year by M.S. (Myer Solomon) Levy. Levy was born in England in January 1852 and raised there, the son of Rabbi Solomon Levy of Borough Synagogue in London. Myer Solomon had been ordained in England as an Orthodox rabbi before he was twenty, and moved to Australia as a young man. An early supporter of Zionism, he had served as a rabbi in Melbourne before moving to California in 1872 or 1873, where he served as the rabbi of Temple Emanu-El (then Bickur Cholim) in San Jose. He then served at the First Hebrew Congregation of Oakland for ten years, but found the congregation not traditional enough for him, and moved to Beth Israel. At Beth Israel he "organized a Hebrew School and a Sunday School, a sisterhood, and a men's club". During his tenure, the congregation's religious orientation was Modern Orthodox.

Joseph Rabinowitz joined Beth Israel as cantor the year the synagogue building at 1411 Geary Street was constructed. A "rich baritone" from a "famous family of Lithuanian cantors", he sang at Beth Israel until 1943. Despite Beth Israel's traditionalism, he was accompanied by both a mixed choir (that included women), and an organ.

In 1905, the congregation started construction of an even larger synagogue building on 1839 Geary Street between Fillmore and Steiner Streets. It was nearing completion when it was destroyed by the 1906 San Francisco earthquake. At the time, the congregation had 200 member families, and an income of $15,800 (today $570,000). Services were held on Shabbat and the Jewish holidays. The congregational school had 250 students and five teachers. The members re-built at the 1839 Geary Street location, and dedicated the building in 1908. An "imposing brick-and-steel" structure, it had an "elaborate wood-carved bimah" and stained-glass windows. Known as the Geary Street Temple, it was "the most visible symbol of traditional Judaism in the city for more than half a century".

Herman Lissauer succeeded Levy as rabbi in 1916, the year he graduated from the Jewish Theological Seminary of America (JTSA). By 1919, the congregation had 325 member families. The congregational school held classes five days a week, and had 250 students and twelve teachers. Lissauer would serve until 1926, then move to San Francisco's Congregation Emanu-El, and subsequently become head of the Warner Bros. Research Department.

Lissauer was succeeded in 1927 by Elliot M. (Maurice) Burstein, who would remain rabbi at Beth Israel for over four decades. Born in New Haven, Connecticut in 1899, Burstein graduated from Columbia College in 1919. He was ordained at the JTSA in 1923, where he also earned a Master of Hebrew Literature degree. Burstein was politically liberal and a Zionist, and served for five years as the president of the Zionist Organization of San Francisco. During his tenure, Beth Israel "gravitated towards Conservative Judaism".

=== Temple Judea ===
Temple Judea was founded in 1953, the first Reform synagogue built in San Francisco in almost 125 years. Robert W. Shapiro was the congregation's first rabbi. In 1957 it purchased land on Stanley Drive, and convinced the city to change the street's name to Brotherhood Way.

In the late 1950s Irving F. Reichert served as Temple Judea's part-time rabbi for three years. Reichert had formerly served as rabbi of Tremont Temple/Scarsdale Synagogue in the Bronx from 1923 to 1930, and San Francisco's Congregation Emanu-El from 1930 to 1947, before retiring from the pulpit at age 53. He was a strong anti-Zionist who supported the creation of the American Council for Judaism (ACJ), and following his retirement from Emanu-El, he served for five years as the executive director of the ACJ's western region.

Herbert Morris was hired as rabbi in 1962. Born in Trenton, New Jersey in 1930, Morris's first rabbinic position had been two years as a chaplain with the United States Navy in Japan in 1956. He subsequently served as a chaplain for the San Francisco Police Department.

The year after Morris joined, Temple Judea sold some of the still-undeveloped land on Brotherhood Way to the Jewish Community Center. That same year the synagogue began construction of a new building, which it completed in 1964 at 625 Brotherhood Way.

== 1969 and 2021 mergers ==
In 1969 the Congregation Beth Israel and Temple Judea merged, after three major potential impediments were resolved: the synagogue would have a "restricted kosher kitchen", Temple Judea's Friday night Torah readings would continue, and the rabbi would still perform intermarriages. Temple Judea's Morris became the rabbi of the combined congregation, and Beth Israel's Burstein became rabbi emeritus. The new congregation moved to Temple Judea's building on Brotherhood Way. The Geary Street Temple eventually became derelict, but was purchased in the late 1980s and renovated by designer Tony Duquette. In 1989, soon after the renovations were complete, it burnt down, and a post office was later built in its place.

At the merged Beth Israel Judea, Friday night services were Reform-oriented, while Saturday morning services had "a Conservative feel". Morris created a new High Holy Day prayerbook for the congregation "combining liturgy of the Reform and Conservative movements". He created a Bar and Bat Mitzvah program for adults, and was a "firm supporter of women's causes [and] civil rights". He also supported Israel, and introduced the practice of confirmation class trips there. In 1976 the congregation built a religious school, and by 1995 there were 486 member families.

Morris retired in 1998, and Beth Israel Judea hired Evan Goodman as his successor. Goodman had previously served as rabbi of Beth El in San Mateo, California for five and a half years. Morris died in 2003, while Goodman served at Beth Israel Judea until leaving in 2006 to take a position at Temple Israel in New Rochelle, New York. That year Rosalind Glazer, a graduate of the Reconstructionist rabbinical college, joined as rabbi.

In the late summer of 2011, the congregation hired Rabbi Danny Gottlieb, who was previously rabbi of Temple Kol Ami in Thornhill, Ontario. In 2011, Beth Israel Judea was a member of the Reform movement; and the rabbi was Danny Gottlieb.

As a result of the 2021 merger, an interim rabbi, Sami Barth, was appointed; and in 2023, a new rabbi, Chayva Lehrma, began leading the merged congregation, that had joint affiliation with the U.S. organizations representing Reform and Conservative congregations.

== Notable congregants ==
- Charlee Minkin (born 1981), Olympic judoka
