= Georgina Singleton =

British Olympic judoka

Personal information
- Nationality: British (English)
- Born: 11 October 1977 (age 48) Ascot, Berkshire, England
- Occupation: Judoka
- Height: 1.52 m (5 ft 0 in)

Sport
- Sport: Judo
- Weight class: –52 kg
- Club: Pinewood Judo Club
Medal record
Representing England
Commonwealth Games
Gold medal – first place	2002 Manchester	52 kg
Representing Great Britain
European Championships
Gold medal – first place	2002 Maribor	52 kg
Silver medal – second place	2000 Wrocław	52 kg
Summer Universiade
Bronze medal – third place	1999 Palma de Mallorca	52 kg

Profile at external databases
- JudoInside.com: 329

Georgina Singleton (born 11 October 1977 in Ascot, Berkshire, England) is an English judoka who competed in the women's half-lightweight category.

== Judo career ==
She held four British Judo Championships titles in her own division, picked up a total of thirty-nine medals in her career, including four from major international tournaments (European Championships, Summer Universiade, Commonwealth Games), and finished seventh in the 52-kg class at the 2004 Summer Olympics. Throughout most of her sporting career, Singleton trained for fifteen years at the Pinewood Judo Club in Wokingham under her personal coach and sensei Don Werner (who died in January 2014). A graduate of the University of Bath, she also worked as a math teacher.

Singleton reached the pinnacle of her sporting career at the 2002 European Judo Championships in Maribor, Slovenia, where she defeated Spain's Ana Carrascosa in a convincing fashion to take home the half-lightweight division title. When the city of Manchester hosted the Commonwealth Games two months later, Singleton delighted the English crowd with another overwhelming victory over Northern Ireland's Lisa Bradley in the same division.

At the 2004 Summer Olympics in Athens, Singleton qualified for Team GB in the women's half-lightweight class (52 kg), by placing fifth at the World Championships in Osaka, Japan, and securing a place with her performance from the British judo trials in Wolverhampton. Singleton got off to a firm start with convincing victories over Brazil's Fabiane Hukuda and Venezuela's Flor Velázquez in the prelims, before she conceded with a shido penalty and then succumbed to an ippon hold from Japan's Yuki Yokosawa during their quarterfinal match. In the repechage round, Singleton edged past North Korea's Ri Sang-Sim with an uchi mata makikomi (inner thigh wraparound) hold to permit herself a chance for an Olympic medal, but her rigid form was not enough to combat Belgium's Ilse Heylen in their subsequent match, relegating Singleton into the seventh position.

Singleton sought her third Olympic bid in Beijing, but finished fifth at the European Championships in Lisbon, effectively missing her chance to compete for the Games due to the qualification rules.
