= Maria Tselaridou =

Greek judoka

Personal information
- Full name: Maria Tselaridou
- Nationality: Greece
- Born: 26 March 1981 (age 45) Alma-Ata, Kazakh SSR, Soviet Union
- Occupation: Judoka
- Height: 1.50 m (4 ft 11 in)
- Weight: 52 kg (115 lb)

Sport
- Sport: Judo
- Event: 52 kg
- Club: AC Victoria Thessaloniki

Profile at external databases
- JudoInside.com: 14275

Maria Tselaridou (Greek: Μαρία Τσελαρίδου; born 26 March 1981 in Alma-Ata, Kazakh SSR) is a Greek judoka, who competed in the women's half-lightweight category. Holding a dual citizenship to compete internationally, Tselaridou picked up the 2009 Greek senior title in her own division, and represented her home nation Greece at the 2004 Summer Olympics in Athens. Tselaridou is also a full-fledged member of the judo squad for AC Victoria Thessaloniki.

Tselaridou qualified for her naturalized Greek squad in the women's half-lightweight class (52 kg) at the 2004 Summer Olympics in Athens, by filling up an entry by the International Judo Federation and the Hellenic Olympic Committee, as Greece received an automatic berth for being the host nation. Tselaridou received a bye in the opening round, but crashed out early in a defeat to Germany's Raffaella Imbriani by an ippon with only forty-five seconds remaining in her first match.
