= Judo at the 2004 Summer Olympics – Women's 52 kg =

Women's 52 kg at the Games of the XXVIII Olympiad
- Venue: Ano Liossia Olympic Hall
- Dates: 15 August 2004
- Competitors: 24 from 24 nations
- Winning score: 1000

Medalists
1st place, gold medalist(s)		Xian Dongmei	China
2nd place, silver medalist(s)		Yuki Yokosawa	Japan
3rd place, bronze medalist(s)		Ilse Heylen	Belgium
3rd place, bronze medalist(s)		Amarilis Savón	Cuba

Women's 52 kg competition in judo at the 2004 Summer Olympics was held on August 15 at the Ano Liossia Olympic Hall.

This event was the second-lightest of the women's judo weight classes, limiting competitors to a maximum of 52 kilograms of body mass. Like all other judo events, bouts lasted five minutes. If the bout was still tied at the end, it was extended for another five-minute, sudden-death period; if neither judoka scored during that period, the match was decided by the judges. The tournament bracket consisted of a single-elimination contest culminating in a gold medal match. There was also a repechage to determine the winners of the two bronze medals. Each judoka who had lost to a semifinalist competed in the repechage. The two judokas who lost in the semifinals faced the winner of the opposite half of the bracket's repechage in bronze medal bouts.

== Schedule ==
All times are Greece Standard Time (UTC+2)

Date	Time	Round
Sunday, 15 August 2004	10:30; 13:00; 17:00	Preliminaries; Repechage; Final

== Qualifying athletes ==
Mat	Athlete	Country
1	Michal Feinblat	Israel
1	M'mah Soumah	Guinea
1	Telma Monteiro	Portugal
1	Annabelle Euranie	France
1	Rochelle Stormont	New Zealand
1	Ioana Maria Aluaş	Romania
1	Raffaella Imbriani	Germany
1	Charlee Minkin	United States
1	Maria Tselaridou	Greece
1	Salima Souakri	Algeria
1	Petra Nareks	Slovenia
1	Xian Dongmei	China
2	Yuki Yokosawa	Japan
2	Ri Sang-sim	North Korea
2	Hortense Diédhiou	Senegal
2	Fabiane Hukuda	Brazil
2	Georgina Singleton	Great Britain
2	Flor Velázquez	Venezuela
2	Amarilis Savón	Cuba
2	Sanna Askelöf	Sweden
2	Lee Eun-hee	South Korea
2	Sholpan Kaliyeva	Kazakhstan
2	Ilse Heylen	Belgium
2	Naina Ravaoarisoa	Madagascar

== Tournament results ==
=== Final ===
Final
1	Xian Dongmei (CHN)	1000
2	Yuki Yokosawa (JPN)	0000

=== Mat 1 ===
Round of 32
M'mah Soumah (GUI)	0000
Telma Monteiro (POR)	1000
Rochelle Stormont (NZL)	0000
Ioana Maria Aluaş (ROU)	1010
Raffaella Imbriani (GER)	0001
Charlee Minkin (USA)	0000
Salima Souakri (ALG)	0010
Petra Nareks (SLO)	0001

Round of 16
Michal Feinblat (ISR)	0000
Telma Monteiro (POR)	1010
Annabelle Euranie (FRA)	0111
Ioana Maria Aluaş (ROU)	0030
Raffaella Imbriani (GER)	1002
Maria Tselaridou (GRE)	0000
Salima Souakri (ALG)	0000
Xian Dongmei (CHN)	0001

Quarterfinals
Telma Monteiro (POR)	0000
Annabelle Euranie (FRA)	0001
Raffaella Imbriani (GER)	0010
Xian Dongmei (CHN)	0221

Semifinals
Annabelle Euranie (FRA)	0010
Xian Dongmei (CHN)	1001

=== Mat 2 ===
Round of 32
Yuki Yokosawa (JPN)	1000
Ri Sang-sim (PRK)	0000
Fabiane Hukuda (BRA)	0000
Georgina Singleton (GBR)	1001
Amarilis Savón (CUB)	1000
Sanna Askelöf (SWE)	0000
Ilse Heylen (BEL)	0200
Naina Ravaoarisoa (MAD)	0000

Round of 16
Yuki Yokosawa (JPN)	0101
Hortense Diédhiou (SEN)	0100
Georgina Singleton (GBR)	0010
Flor Velázquez (VEN)	0000
Amarilis Savón (CUB)	1010
Lee Eun-hee (KOR)	0000
Sholpan Kaliyeva (KAZ)	0000
Ilse Heylen (BEL)	1000

Quarterfinals
Yuki Yokosawa (JPN)	1001
Georgina Singleton (GBR)	0000
Amarilis Savón (CUB)	0101
Ilse Heylen (BEL)	0000

Semifinals
Yuki Yokosawa (JPN)	1000
Amarilis Savón (CUB)	0010

=== Repechage ===
Those judoka eliminated in earlier rounds by the four semifinalists of the main bracket advanced to the repechage. These matches determined the two bronze medalists for the event.

First round
Ri Sang-sim (PRK)	0020
Hortense Diédhiou (SEN)	0000
Sanna Askelöf (SWE)	1001
Lee Eun-Hee (KOR)	0000

Second round
Ioana Maria Aluaş (ROU)	1000
Telma Monteiro (POR)	0000
Salima Souakri (ALG)	0110
Raffaella Imbriani (GER)	0001
Ri Sang-sim (PRK)	0010
Georgina Singleton (GBR)	0011
Sanna Askelöf (SWE)	0000
Ilse Heylen (BEL)	0201

Third round
Ioana Maria Aluaş (ROU)	0100
Salima Souakri (ALG)	0121
Georgina Singleton (GBR)	0000
Ilse Heylen (BEL)	0011

Bronze medal finals
Salima Souakri (ALG)	0000
Amarilis Savón (CUB)	0100
Ilse Heylen (BEL)	0001
Annabelle Euranie (FRA)	0000
