= Hendrik Degros =

Belgian equestrian

Personal information
- Nationality: Belgian
- Born: 25 April 1975 (age 49); Hasselt, Belgium

Sport
- Sport: Equestrian

Hendrik Degros (born 25 April 1975) is a Belgian equestrian. He competed in two events at the 2004 Summer Olympics.
