= Sanna Askelöf =

Swedish judoka (born 1983)

Personal information
- Full name: Sanna Maria Karolin Askelöf
- Born: 5 February 1983 (age 43) Stockholm, Sweden
- Occupation: Judoka
- Height: 1.58 m (5 ft 2 in)

Sport
- Country: Sweden
- Sport: Judo
- Weight class: –52 kg
- Club: IK Södra

Achievements and titles
- Olympic Games: 9th (2004)
- World Champ.: R32 (2003, 2009)
- European Champ.: R16 (2004, 2005, 2009)
Medal record
Women's judo
Representing Sweden
European Junior Championships
Gold medal – first place	2002 Rotterdam	–52 kg

Profile at external databases
- IJF: 6008
- JudoInside.com: 15541
- Updated on 14 February 2022

Sanna Maria Karolin Askelöf (born 5 February 1983 in Stockholm) is a Swedish judoka who competed in the women's half-lightweight category. Being raised by a Swedish father and a Norwegian mother and holding a dual citizenship to compete internationally, Askelof held five national senior titles in her own division, picked up a total of twenty-eight medals in her career, and represented her paternal nation Sweden in the 52-kg class at the 2004 Summer Olympics. Throughout most of her sporting career until 2009, she trained as a full-fledged member of the judo squad for Södra Sports Club (Swedish: Idrotts Klubb Södra, IK Södra) in Farsta.

Askelof qualified as a lone judoka for the Swedish squad in the women's half-lightweight class (52 kg) at the 2004 Summer Olympics in Athens, by placing third from the A-Tournament in Tallinn, Estonia. She lost her opening match to Cuba's Amarilis Savón, who successfully scored an ippon and gripped her with a kuzure kami shiho gatame (broken upper four-quarter hold down) at one minute and twenty-seven seconds. In the repechage, Askelof mounted her strength on the tatami to outscore and pin South Korea's Lee Eun-hee thirty-seven seconds into the match, but slipped her medal chance away in a defeat to Belgian judoka and eventual bronze medalist Ilse Heylen by a waza-ari awasete ippon point and a kesa-gatame (scarf hold).
