= Charlee Minkin =

American judoka (born 1981)

Personal information
- National team: United States
- Born: November 13, 1981 (age 44) Half Moon Bay, California
- Education: University of Colorado Colorado Springs
- Occupation: Judoka

Sport
- Sport: Judo, BJJ
- Weight class: –52 kg
Medal record
Women's Judo
Representing the United States
Pan American Games
Silver medal – second place	2003	Half Lightweight
Women's Brazilian Jiu-Jitsu
IBJJF Pan Am Championships
Gold medal – first place	2011

Profile at external databases
- JudoInside.com: 11404

Charlee Minkin (born November 13, 1981) is an American Olympic judoka. She won three national titles (2000, 2002, and 2004), and won the silver medal in the women's half lightweight division (–52 kg) at the 2003 Pan American Games. In 2011 she won the gold medal in Brazilian Jiu-Jitsu at the IBJJF Pan Am Championships.

== Early and personal life ==
Minkin was born in Half Moon Bay, California. She is Jewish, was bat mitzvah, and attended Congregation Beth Israel-Judea in San Francisco. Her mother is Carolyn Minkin (a black belt), her father, former Green Beret Stephen Minkin, died in a plane crash when she was five years old, and she has three siblings, Zisa, Ben, and Davina (trained in Israel for a year with Olympic medalist Yael Arad). She attended Brandeis Hillel Day School in San Francisco. She then attended the University of Colorado Colorado Springs.

== Judo career ==
Minkin has been coached by Ed Liddie.

In 1998 she won the silver medal in the Pan American U20 Championships (–52 kg). Minkin won three national titles (2000, 2002 (as her older sister Davina won the 57 kg gold medal), and 2004; –52 kg)) and five continental titles.

Minkin won the silver medal in the women's half lightweight division (–52 kg) at the 2003 Pan American Games in Santo Domingo, Dominican Republic.

She represented her native country at the age of 22 at the 2004 Summer Olympics in Women's 52 kg in Athens, Greece.

== Career after judo ==
In 2005, she began a career as a personal trainer. In 2007, Minkin began working as a police agent for the Lakewood, Colorado, Police Department. In 2009, she began to train in Brazilian Jiu-Jitsu and won the gold medal at the 2011 IBJJF Pan Am Championships.

== See also ==
- List of select Jewish judokas

== Source ==
- Evans, Hilary; Gjerde, Arild; Heijmans, Jeroen; Mallon, Bill; et al. "Charlee Minkin". Olympics at Sports-Reference.com. Sports Reference LLC. Archived from the original on 2020-04-18.
