= Dolf Desmedt =

Belgian equestrian

Personal information
- Nationality: Belgian
- Born: 27 April 1980 (age 46) Turnhout, Belgium

Sport
- Sport: Equestrian
Medal record
Equestrian
Representing Belgium
European Championships
Bronze medal – third place	2003 Punchestown	Team eventing

Dolf Desmedt (born 27 April 1980) is a Belgian equestrian. He competed in two events at the 2004 Summer Olympics.
