= Naina Ravaoarisoa =

Malaysian Olympic judoka

Personal information
- Full name: Naina Cécilia Ravaoarisoa
- Nationality: Madagascar
- Born: 29 July 1976 (age 49) Antananarivo, Madagascar
- Height: 1.55 m (5 ft 1 in)
- Weight: 52 kg (115 lb)

Sport
- Sport: Judo
- Event: 52 kg
Medal record
Women's judo
Representing Madagascar
All-Africa Games
Bronze medal – third place	1999 Johannesburg	52 kg
African Judo Championships
Bronze medal – third place	1996 South Africa	52 kg

Naina Cécilia Ravaoarisoa (born July 29, 1976 in Antananarivo) is a Malagasy judoka who competed in the women's half-lightweight category. She picked up a total of six medals in her career, including a bronze from the 1999 All-Africa Games in Johannesburg, South Africa, and represented her nation Madagascar in two editions of the Olympic Games (2000 and 2004).

Ravaoarisoa made her official debut at the 2000 Summer Olympics in Sydney, where she competed in the women's half-lightweight class (52 kg). She lost her opening match to Chinese Taipei's Shih Pei-chun, who successfully scored an ippon victory and crippled her in a scarf hold (kesa gatame) on the tatami with only ninety seconds remaining in the five-minute bout.

At the 2004 Summer Olympics in Athens, Ravaoarisoa qualified as a lone judoka for her second Malagasy squad in the women's half-lightweight class (52 kg), by placing second and granting a berth from the African Championships in Tunis, Tunisia. Like her previous Olympics, Ravaoarisoa denied her chance to edge past the opening round and to compete in the repechage, after crashing out early in a defeat to Belgian judoka and eventual bronze medalist Ilse Heylen by a waza-ari awasete ippon point and a powerful deashi harai throw (advanced foot sweep) just 34 seconds into their match.
