= Frances Sussna =

American educator and innovator (born 1933)

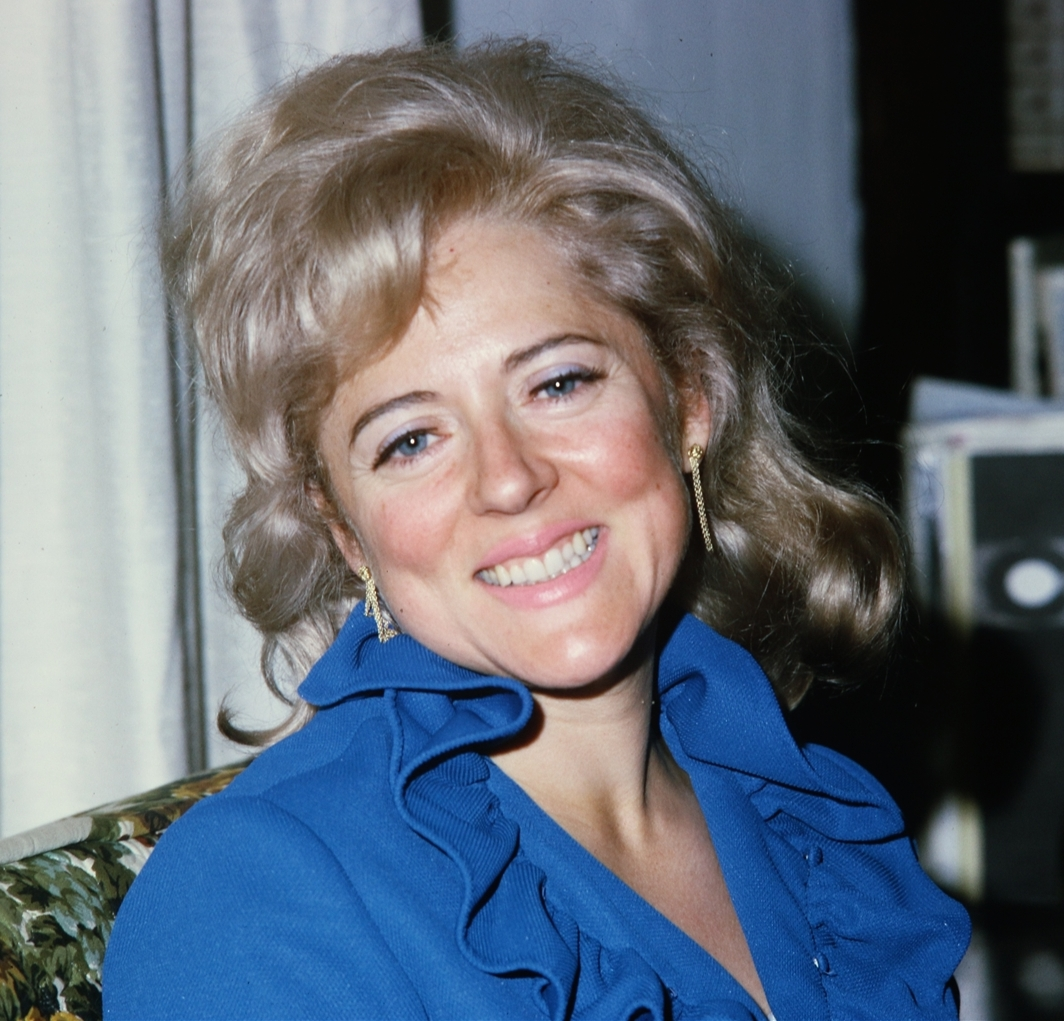
- American educator
- Born: October 23, 1933 (age 92); Philadelphia, Pennsylvania, U.S.
- Occupation: Educator
- Parent(s): Joseph Sussna; Ethel Stein
- Website: francessussnaprojects.com, francessussna.com

Frances Sussna (born October 23, 1933) is an American educator and innovator best known for her work in multi-cultural education. Her methods of motivating students of diverse ethnic backgrounds to higher achievement and social responsibility, including respect of self and others and skills of peaceful conflict resolution, won her the support of the Ford Foundation, Rockefeller Foundation, the Lilly Endowment, Rosenberg Foundation, and the San Francisco Foundation, among others.

== Biography ==
=== Early life ===
Sussna was born on October 23, 1933, in Philadelphia, Pennsylvania, to Ukrainian-Jewish immigrant Joseph Sussna and his wife Ethel Stein. Sussna and her older sister were the only Jewish children in a strongly antisemitic neighborhood in North Philadelphia. Due to the absence of any Hebrew schools in the area, Sussna and her sister received no formal Jewish education.

Sussna attended Olney High School in Philadelphia where she befriended future award-winning Yiddish poet, Rukhl Fishman, the sister of renowned linguist, Joshua Fishman.

Sussna attended Temple University for a year and a half. In college, she held multiple jobs one of which was as a librarian in the English department at Gratz College. At the Jewish college, she was exposed to books and resources about the Jewish experience. She read books about The Holocaust, the State of Israel, and on kibbutz movement. Sussna's time working at Gratz College and a fateful conversation with her friend Rukhl, influenced Sussna's decision to leave Temple University and go to Israel.

=== Israel ===
Arriving in Haifa in 1953, Sussna decided to join a group of Jewish teenagers from South America to create a kibbutz and military outpost along the Jordanian border. Sussna lived on other kibbutzim and later lived in Jerusalem where she worked as an editor for The Jerusalem Post.

=== Brandeis ===
In 1960, Sussna accepted positions on the faculties of San Francisco’s College of Jewish Studies and Hebrew High School. She became convinced that the answer to adequate Jewish education for children was a Jewish day school. She recruited a prominent local Jewish leader, Rabbi Saul White, to help her raise funds to start one. On September 4, 1963, the Modern Hebrew Day School opened its doors with Sussna as its Founder and Director, and with Rabbi White as an important member of the Board of Trustees. A few months after its opening, the school changed its name to Brandeis Day School. Sussna chose the name "Brandeis" as a nod to Supreme Court Justice Louis Brandeis and as a nod to the Brandies University graduate fellowship she had passed up in order to sustain the school. The school was an immediate success with high student satisfaction and achievement. The Ford Foundation awarded her a prestigious grant.

Sussna was concerned that the needs of non-Jewish students at the school were not being fully met. She proposed a modification of the school's structure so that while Jewish students had Jewish studies, the other children would be similarly immersed in their own separate cultural studies. Once a week each group would be host or guest of another group to share with them what they learned and to practice good inter-group communication. Her proposal was approved by the Board of Directors, the staff, and the Parent Council, however, the Bureau of Jewish Education strongly opposed it.

Sussna formed a Multi-Culture advisory council to Brandeis consisting of prominent leaders of various San Francisco ethnic groups.

=== Multi-Culture Institute ===
The Bureau's obstruction of efforts to establish the Multi-Culture Program at Brandies, convinced Sussna in March 1967 to leave Brandeis to start the program as a new endeavor. The Multi-Culture Institute, as it became known, received seed money from the Rosenberg Foundation and the San Francisco Foundation and eventually received large grants from the Ford Foundation, the Rockefeller Foundation, and the Lilly Endowment among others. The school separated students for part of the day by ethnic group to enable them to talk among themselves about themselves with teachers of their own ethnic background. Students were taught the language, literature, history, geography, music, fine arts, and folklore of their own ethnic heritages. On Friday, groups would teach other groups about their own cultural backgrounds in a "children teaching children" format. Students developed self-love, pride in heritage, and appreciation and understanding of the heritage of others.

Sussna's teaching methods were praised by the San Francisco Board of Supervisors, the National Urban League, the NAACP, the Human Rights Council, the American Jewish Committee, the National Education Association, and more.

Public school districts including New York City, Seattle, and Los Angeles established model programs of the Multi-Culture Institute. Selected parents, teachers, and administrators from public and parochial schools in those cities participated in summer trainings of the Sussna Teaching Method at San Francisco State University. Staff from the Multi-Culture Program in San Francisco worked with and supported them throughout the school year.

=== Frances Sussna Projects ===
In 2017, Sussna started the Frances Sussna Projects to introduce schools to her Sussna Teaching Method.

== Honours, decorations, awards and distinctions ==
In 1963, Sussna received a Bachelor's Degree in Near Eastern Languages from the University of California, Berkeley. Sussna served on the faculties of the College of Jewish Studies and the Teachers Institute of San Francisco. She also served as a consultant to several educational and governmental organizations, including Columbia University and the U.S. Department of Health, Education, and Welfare. In 1969, Sussna was appointed "Expert Consultant" to the United States Office of Education. In 1970, she was invited to participate in the White House Conference on Children and also gave expert testimony before Congress on Title IX legislation. She was invited to advise members of Congress on The Elementary and Secondary Education Act (ESEA). In 1971, Sussna received a Doctorate of Humane Letters, Honoris Causa, from the University of San Francisco. She was the youngest person and the first woman to receive that degree from this University. That year, Sussna delivered the major address at the National Education Association's Conference on Civil and Human Rights in Education. The association unanimously passed a resolution to establish mechanisms to implement Sussna Teaching Methods in all public schools across the country. In 1972, Sussna served as an “Expert Specialist” on the panel of the National Center for Education Research and Development where she evaluated the work of multiple United States National Educational Laboratories and Research Centers and recommended funding levels for those laboratories and centers. She was the only woman on the nine-member panel.

In 1973, Sussna spent a month as a “Scholar-in-Residence” at the Rockefeller Villa Serbelloni in Bellagio, Italy. The Bellagio Center Residency Program gives prominent individuals in various fields the ability to spend weeks at the Villa to peacefully contemplate their work. Between 1973 and 1974 the Ford Foundation sponsored Sussna’s travel abroad to investigate the potential of introducing her program to other countries.
