= Lisa Chapman =

English swimmer (born 1984)

Personal information
- Full name: Lisa Chapman
- National team: Great Britain
- Born: 18 August 1984 (age 41) Hastings, England
- Height: 1.67 m (5 ft 6 in)
- Weight: 60 kg (130 lb)

Sport
- Sport: Swimming
- Strokes: Freestyle, medley
- Club: Hastings seagulls
- College team: Loughborough University
- Coach: Ian Armiger
Medal record
Women's swimming
Representing Great Britain
European Championships (SC)
Silver medal – second place	2004 Vienna	100 m medley

Lisa Chapman (born 18 August 1984) is an English former competitive swimmer who represented Great Britain in the Olympics and European championships. She competed internationally in freestyle and individual medley swimming events. She qualified as an Olympian and won a silver medal at the European Short Course Championships in 2004. Chapman attended Loughborough University, where she also competed for the swimming team under head coach Ian Armiger.

Chapman qualified for the women's 4×100 m freestyle relay, as a member of Team GB at the 2004 Summer Olympics in Athens. She finished fourth in the 100 m freestyle from the Olympic trials in Sheffield, posting a relay entry time of 56.17. Teaming with Melanie Marshall, Karen Pickering and Kathryn Evans in the final, Chapman posted a lifetime best and a split of 55.49 to anchor the last 50 metres of the race. This helped the British team achieve sixth-place with a final time of 3:40.82, almost 5 seconds behind the world record set by the winning Australians.

Four months after competing in her first Olympics, Chapman earned her first career medal, a sterling silver, in the 100 m individual medley at the 2004 European Short Course Swimming Championships in Vienna, Austria (1:00.88).

On 7 November 2005 Chapman made her decision to retire from swimming, and instead pursued coaching opportunities around the pool.
