= Fabiane Hukuda =

Brazilian judoka (born 1981)

Personal information
- Born: 12 July 1981 (age 44)
- Occupation: Judoka

Sport
- Country: Brazil; Austria
- Sport: Judo
- Weight class: ‍–‍52 kg
- Club: LZ Wels

Achievements and titles
- Olympic Games: R32 (2004)
- World Champ.: 7th (2001)
- Pan American Champ.: (1998, 2003, 2005)
Medal record
Women's judo
Representing Brazil
Pan American Games
| Bronze medal – third place | 1999 Winnipeg | ‍–‍52 kg |
| Bronze medal – third place | 2003 Santo Domingo | ‍–‍52 kg |
Pan American Championships
| Bronze medal – third place | 1998 Santo Domingo | ‍–‍52 kg |
| Bronze medal – third place | 2003 Salvador | ‍–‍52 kg |
| Bronze medal – third place | 2005 Caguas | ‍–‍52 kg |
World Juniors Championships
| Gold medal – first place | 2000 Nabeul | ‍–‍52 kg |
| Silver medal – second place | 1998 Cali | ‍–‍52 kg |
Pan American Junior Championships
| Gold medal – first place | 1998 Maracaibo | ‍–‍52 kg |

Profile at external databases
- IJF: 6534
- JudoInside.com: 6269
- Updated on 23 February 2022

Fabiane Mayumi Hukuda-Strubreiter (née Hukuda; born 12 July 1981, in Registro) is a female judoka from Brazil, who twice won the bronze medal in the half lightweight division (–52 kg) at the Pan American Games (1999 and 2003). A resident of Belo Horizonte, she represented her native country at the 2004 Summer Olympics in Athens, Greece.
