= Ilse Heylen =

Belgian judoka (born 1977)

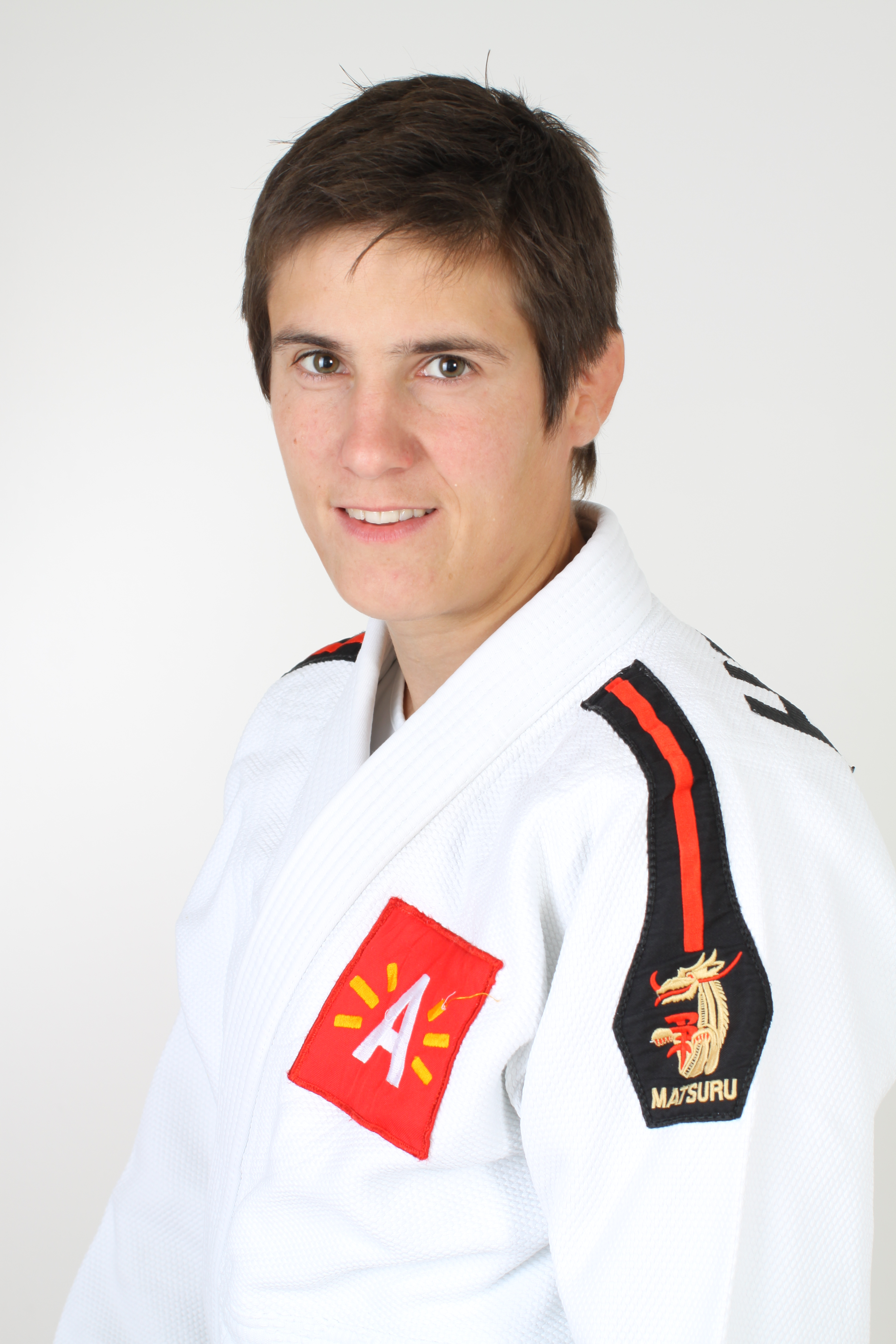

Personal information
- Born: 21 March 1977 (age 49)
- Occupation: Judoka
- Website: www.ilseheylen.be

Sport
- Country: Belgium
- Sport: Judo
- Weight class: ‍–‍52 kg

Achievements and titles
- Olympic Games: (bronze) (2004)
- World Champ.: 9th (2007)
- European Champ.: (gold) (2005)
Medal record
Women's judo
Representing Belgium
Olympic Games
Bronze medal – third place	2004 Athens	‍–‍52 kg
European Championships
Gold medal – first place	2005 Rotterdam	‍–‍52 kg
Silver medal – second place	2004 Bucharest	‍–‍52 kg
Bronze medal – third place	2006 Tampere	‍–‍52 kg
Bronze medal – third place	2007 Belgrade	‍–‍52 kg
Bronze medal – third place	2009 Tbilisi	‍–‍52 kg
Bronze medal – third place	2010 Vienna	‍–‍52 kg
World Masters
Bronze medal – third place	2012 Almaty	‍–‍52 kg
IJF Grand Slam
Silver medal – second place	2012 Moscow	‍–‍52 kg
Bronze medal – third place	2009 Rio de Janeiro	‍–‍52 kg
Bronze medal – third place	2010 Paris	‍–‍52 kg
Bronze medal – third place	2012 Rio de Janeiro	‍–‍52 kg
IJF Grand Prix
Gold medal – first place	2013 Almaty	‍–‍52 kg
Gold medal – first place	2013 Tashkent	‍–‍52 kg
Silver medal – second place	2009 Abu Dhabi	‍–‍52 kg
Silver medal – second place	2013 Rijeka	‍–‍52 kg
Silver medal – second place	2015 Tbilisi	‍–‍52 kg
Silver medal – second place	2015 Samsun	‍–‍52 kg
Silver medal – second place	2016 Havana	‍–‍52 kg
Bronze medal – third place	2010 Düsseldorf	‍–‍52 kg
Bronze medal – third place	2012 Abu Dhabi	‍–‍52 kg
Bronze medal – third place	2012 Qingdao	‍–‍52 kg
Bronze medal – third place	2013 Miami	‍–‍52 kg
Summer Universiade
Bronze medal – third place	1999 Palma de Mallorca	‍–‍48 kg

Profile at external databases
- IJF: 325
- JudoInside.com: 167
- Updated on 31 May 2023

Ilse Heylen (born 21 March 1977 in Edegem) is a Belgian judoka. She won the bronze medal at the 2004 Summer Olympics in Athens, Greece.

At the 2004 Summer Olympics in Athens, Heylen competed in the Half-lightweight (52 kg). She won her first two bouts against Madagascar's Naina Ravaoarisoa and Kazakhstan's Sholpan Kaliyeva before losing to Cuba's Amarilis Savón, the eventual bronze medal winner, she advanced to the repechage however. She won all of her repechage bouts over Sanna Askelöf of Sweden and Georgina Singleton of Great Britain before winning her bronze medal bout over France's Annabelle Euranie.

Heylen also became the 2005 European Champion (in Rotterdam) and won a silver medal in 2004 and a bronze medal at the 2006, 2007, 2009 and 2010 European Championships.

Heylen also competed at the 2008 and 2012 Summer Olympics. At the 2012 Summer Olympics, she reached the semi-finals, where she was defeated by the eventual silver medalist, Yanet Bermoy.
