= David O'Brien (swimmer) =

British swimmer

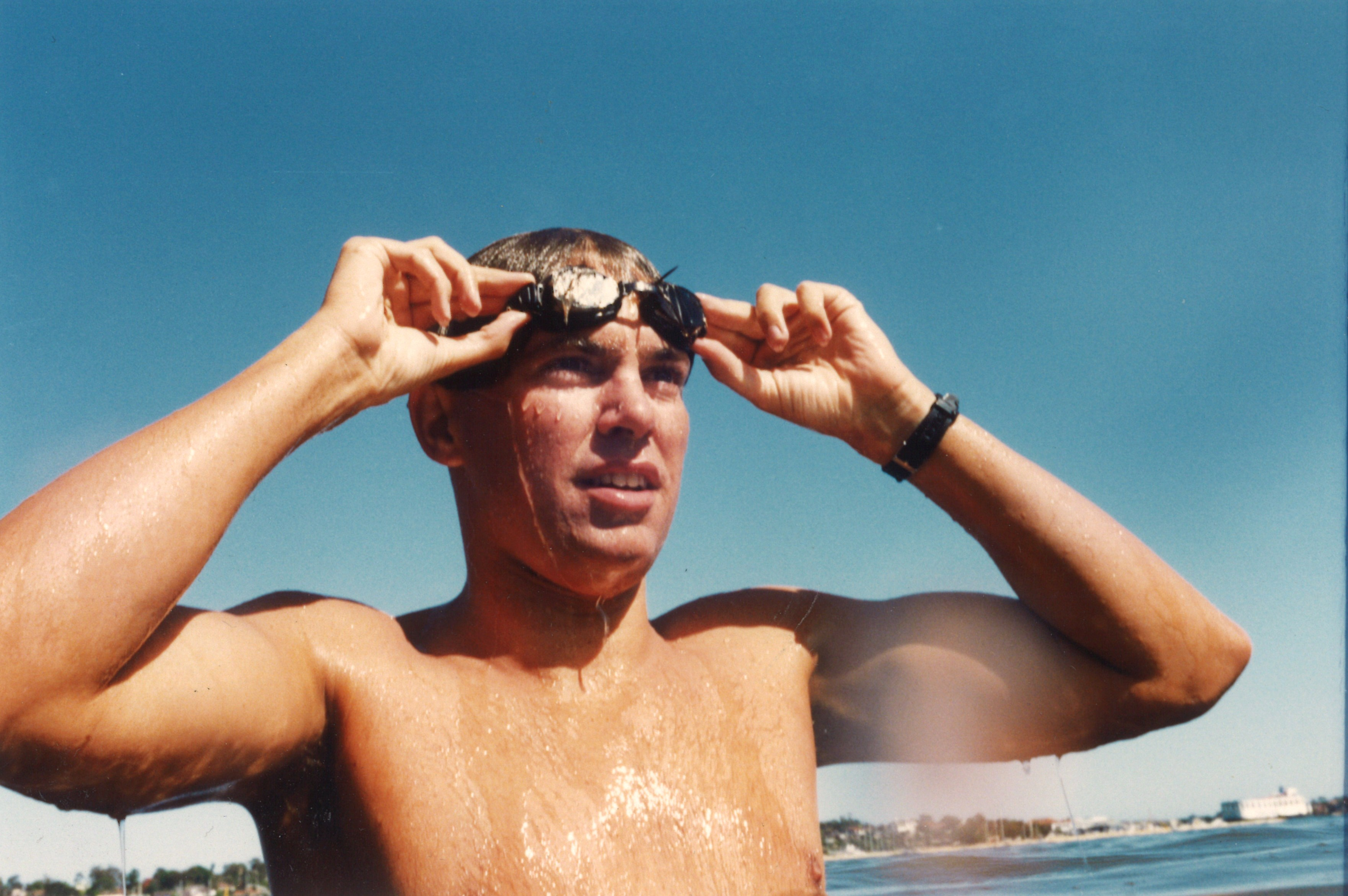
- Image of David O'Brien

Personal information
- Nickname: Dave
- Nationality: Great Britain
- Born: 28 January 1983 (age 43) Sydney, Australia
- Height: 1.83 m (6 ft 0 in)
- Weight: 78 kg (172 lb)

Sport
- Sport: Swimming
- Strokes: Freestyle
- Club: University of Stirling
- Coach: Chris Martin

David O'Brien (born 28 January 1983) is a retired Australian swimmer, who specialized in freestyle events. He is a single-time Olympian (2004), a resident athlete of Team GB, and a member of Stirling Swimming Club, under head coach Chris Martin.

O'Brien qualified for the men's 4×200 m freestyle relay, as a member of the British team, at the 2004 Summer Olympics in Athens. He finished sixth in the 200 m freestyle from the Olympic trials in Sheffield, posting a relay entry time of 1:51.12. Teaming with Simon Burnett, Gavin Meadows, and Ross Davenport in the final, O'Brien swam a third leg and recorded a split of 1:49.05. He and the rest of the Brits missed the podium by 0.77 seconds behind the Italians, led by Massimiliano Rosolino, finishing fourth in a new national record of 7:12.60.
