= Uchi mata makikomi =

Judo techniqueJudo technique

- Classification: Nage-waza
- Sub classification: Sutemi-waza
- Kodokan: Yes

Technique name
- Rōmaji: Uchi-mata makikomi
- Japanese: 内股巻込
- English: Inner thigh wraparound

Uchi Mata Makikomi (内股巻込) is one of the techniques adopted later by the Kodokan into their Shinmeisho No Waza (newly accepted techniques) list. It is categorized as a side sacrifice technique, Yoko-sutemi.

== Technique Description ==
This technique involves drawing your opponent forward with your non-dominant hand, while putting your dominant hand completely past their opposite shoulder, turn, and bend forward while blocking with your dominant leg. Carry opponent over as you sacrifice on top on them.

== Included Systems ==
- Judo
