= Yuki Yokosawa =

Japanese judoka (born 1980)

Personal information
- Born: 29 October 1980 (age 45)
- Occupation: Judoka

Sport
- Country: Japan
- Sport: Judo
- Weight class: –52 kg

Achievements and titles
- Olympic Games: (silver) (2004)
- World Champ.: (silver) (2005)
- Asian Champ.: (gold) (2001)
Medal record
Women's judo
Representing Japan
Olympic Games
Silver medal – second place	2004 Athens	‍–‍52 kg
World Championships
Silver medal – second place	2005 Cairo	‍–‍52 kg
Bronze medal – third place	2003 Osaka	‍–‍52 kg
Asian Games
Bronze medal – third place	2006 Doha	‍–‍52 kg
Asian Championships
Gold medal – first place	2001 Ulaanbaatar	‍–‍52 kg
Bronze medal – third place	2005 Tashkent	‍–‍52 kg
East Asian Championships
Silver medal – second place	2007 Shenzhen	‍–‍52 kg

Profile at external databases
- IJF: 2327
- JudoInside.com: 11403
- Updated on 31 May 2023

Yuki Yokosawa (横澤由貴, Yokosawa Yuki; born 29 October 1980) is a female judoka in Japan. She was born in Maebashi, Gunma.

== Early life ==
She started judo when she was an elementary school student, influenced by her brother and father.

== Prizes ==
She has won many prizes at Judo events all over the world.

- Women's ‍–‍52 kg category
  - 2003 World Championships (in Osaka, Japan) — bronze medal
  - 2004 Summer Olympics (in Athens, Greece) — silver medal
  - 2004 Fukuoka International Women's Judo Championships (in Fukuoka, Japan) — 1st place

== Post Competition ==
Yokosawa retired from competition in 2008 and emigrated to Canada in 2011. As of 2023 Yokosawa was an instructor at the Steveston Judo Club in Richmond, British Columbia, Canada.
