= Brazil at the 2004 Summer Olympics =

- IOC code: BRA
- NOC: Brazilian Olympic Committee
- Website: www.cob.org.br (in Portuguese)

in Athens
- Competitors: 247 in 24 sports
- Flag bearer: Torben Grael
- Medals Ranked 16th: Gold 5 Silver 2 Bronze 3 Total 10

Summer Olympics appearances (overview)
- 1920; 1924; 1928; 1932; 1936; 1948; 1952; 1956; 1960; 1964; 1968; 1972; 1976; 1980; 1984; 1988; 1992; 1996; 2000; 2004; 2008; 2012; 2016; 2020; 2024

Brazil competed at the 2004 Summer Olympics in Athens, Greece, from 13 to 29 August 2004. This was the nation's nineteenth appearance at the Summer Olympics, excluding the 1928 Summer Olympics in Amsterdam. The Brazilian Olympic Committee (Portuguese: Comitê Olímpico Brasileiro, COB) sent the nation's largest ever delegation in history to the Games. A total of 243 athletes, 124 men and 119 women, competed in 24 sports.

Brazil left Athens with a total of 10 medals (5 golds, 2 silver, and 3 bronze), the lowest in Summer Olympics since 1992. Although the nation's final medal count could not surpass its previous records set in Atlanta (15 medals) and Sydney (12 medals), Brazil produced a record of five golds at these edition, a performance only surpassed 12 years later in Rio de Janeiro, when Brazil was the host country and won seven gold medals.

Brazil conquered its first gold medal ever in Equestrian as also in a mixed Olympic event, with the gold medal won by Rodrigo Pessoa in individual jumping.

== Summary ==
Until the Athens 2004 Games, Brazil had only a two-time Olympic champion, the legendary Adhemar Ferreira da Silva, who shone on the triple jump in Helsinki-1952 and Melbourne-1956. That changed when sailor Robert Scheidt shone in the Laser class and secured his second gold medal (he had already been champion in Atlanta 1996).

Also in the sailing, Torben Grael and Marcelo Ferreira reached gold in the Star class. Both became two-time Olympic champions since they had won in Atlanta-1996. With the achievement, Torben Grael wrote his name in history (at the time) as the greatest Olympic athlete in Brazil at all times, with five medals ( a performance also matched by Robert Scheidt 8 years later ). He is also one of the sailors with the largest number of Olympic medals at all times, along with Robert Scheidt and British Ben Ainslie.

In the men's volleyball the team coached by Bernardo Rezende and led by Gilberto Godoy Filho of the Brazil men's national volleyball team, Brazil defeated Italy in the final by 3 to 1 and secured the second gold medal of national volleyball in the Olympic Games. In the team were Maurício Lima and Giovane Gávio, remnants of the historic triumph of the tournament of Barcelona 1992.

In men's beach volleyball, Emanuel Rego and Ricardo Santos defeated the Spaniards Javier Bosma and Pablo Herrera in the final and secured the gold. It was the first gold medal ever won by Brazilian men in beach volleyball. In women's beach volleyball Shelda Bede and Adriana Behar again came to the decision, but as they did four years earlier in Sydney, they silver medalists, after losing to Kerri Walsh and Misty May.

Led by Formiga and Marta, women's national football team finally won the first Olympic medal ever. The team advanced to the final against United States. After a very tough match with a draw of 1–1 in regular time, the Americans won the gold medal match by 2–1 at extra time, leaving Brazil with the silver medal.

Brazilian judokas won two more podiums for Brazil. Leandro Guilheiro was responsible for giving the country the first medal in Athens, the bronze in men's 81 kg. The second Brazilian medal in that edition also came from judo, with the bronze of Flávio Canto, in men's 81 kg category.

In the men's marathon, one of the most remarkable scenes of the Athens 2004 Games, which gained worldwide notoriety, involved the marathon runner Vanderlei de Lima. He was leading the race, which closes the Olympics, when, at the time of the 36th of the 42 kilometers of the race, he was attacked by Irish religious fanatic Cornelius Horan. The Brazilian was pushed off the track by Cornelius. Despite that, Vanderlei returned to the race, but with the time lost in the unforeseen event, he was overtaken by the Italian Stefano Baldini and the American Mebrahtom Keflezighi. Vanderlei, meanwhile, maintained the third position and, thus, was left with the bronze medal. He was the first and so far the only Brazilian marathon runner to obtain an Olympic medal. Later, Vanderlei de Lima received the prestigious Pierre de Coubertin Medal to his achievements for sportsmanship. The medal, one of the most important awarded by the International Olympic Committee, is dedicated to athletes who value sport more than victory itself. At the 2016 Summer Olympics in Rio de Janeiro, Vanderlei de Lima received the honour of lighting the Olympic Flame as the final member of the torch relay.

Brazilian equestrian and show jumper Rodrigo Pessoa was the originally the silver medalist in individual jumping. On October 8, 2004, the International Federation for Equestrian Sports ordered a suspension for Ireland's Cian O'Connor after his horse Waterford Crystal failed a doping test for fluphenazine and zuclopenthixol. Because O'Connor decided not to appeal and formally strip off his Olympic title in men's show jumping, silver Rodrigo Pessoa was subsequently awarded and received his gold medal at a public ceremony on Copacabana Beach in August 2005. This was the first and so far the only gold medal won by Brazil not only in Equestrian as also in a mixed Olympic event.

== Medalists ==
Medal	Name	Sport	Event	Date
Gold	Robert Scheidt	Sailing	Laser class	August 22
Gold	Emanuel Rego; Ricardo Santos	Volleyball	Men's beach volleyball	August 25
Gold	Rodrigo Pessoa	Equestrian	Individual jumping	August 27
Gold	Marcelo Ferreira; Torben Grael	Sailing	Star class	August 28
Gold	Brazil men's national volleyball team: Dante Amaral; Nalbert Bitencourt; Gustavo Endres; Ricardo Garcia; Giovane Gávio; Gilberto Godoy Filho; André Heller; Maurício Lima; André Nascimento; Sérgio Santos; Anderson Rodrigues; Rodrigo Santana	Volleyball	Men's tournament	August 29
Silver	Shelda Bede; Adriana Behar	Volleyball	Women's beach volleyball	August 24
Silver	Brazil women's national football team: Daniela; Rosana; Renata Costa; Roseli; Mônica; Cristiane; Maycon; Pretinha; Formiga; Elaine; Aline; Dayane; Tânia; Grazielle; Juliana; Andréia; Marta; Maravilha	Football	Women's tournament	August 26
Bronze	Leandro Guilheiro	Judo	Men's 73 kg	August 16
Bronze	Flávio Canto	Judo	Men's 81 kg	August 17
Bronze	Vanderlei de Lima	Athletics	Men's marathon	August 29

Medals by sport
Sport	1st place, gold medalist(s)	2nd place, silver medalist(s)	3rd place, bronze medalist(s)	Total
Volleyball	2	1	0	3
Sailing	2	0	0	2
Equestrian	1	0	0	1
Football	0	1	0	1
Judo	0	0	2	2
Athletics	0	0	1	1
Total	5	2	3	10

Medals by date
Date	1st place, gold medalist(s)	2nd place, silver medalist(s)	3rd place, bronze medalist(s)	Total
14 Aug	0	0	0	0
15 Aug	0	0	0	0
16 Aug	0	0	1	1
17 Aug	0	0	1	1
18 Aug	0	0	0	0
19 Aug	0	0	0	0
20 Aug	0	0	0	0
21 Aug	0	0	0	0
22 Aug	1	0	0	1
23 Aug	0	0	0	0
24 Aug	0	1	0	1
25 Aug	1	0	0	1
26 Aug	0	1	0	1
27 Aug	1	0	0	1
28 Aug	1	0	0	1
29 Aug	1	0	1	2
Total	5	2	3	10

Medals by gender
Gender	1st place, gold medalist(s)	2nd place, silver medalist(s)	3rd place, bronze medalist(s)	Total
Male	4	0	3	7
Female	0	2	0	2
Mixed/Open (Note: Medals won in Equestrian are considered an open event because men and women compete together.)	1	0	0	1
Total	5	2	3	10

== Athletics ==
Brazilian athletes have so far achieved qualifying standards in the following athletics events (up to a maximum of 3 athletes in each event at the 'A' Standard, and 1 at the 'B' Standard). Marathon runner Vanderlei de Lima was awarded a prestigious Pierre de Coubertin Medal from the International Olympic Committee for sportsmanship after being attacked by Irish protester Cornelius Horan, who pushed him off the road four miles from the finish line.

Key

- Note–Ranks given for track events are within the athlete's heat only
- Q = Qualified for the next round
- NR = National record
- N/A = Round not applicable for the event
- Bye = Athlete not required to compete in round

Men
Track & road events

Athlete	Event	Heat		Quarterfinal		Semifinal		Final	
Athlete	Event	Result	Rank	Result	Rank	Result	Rank	Result	Rank
Vicente de Lima	100 m	10.23	4 Q	10.26	3 Q	10.28	8	Did not advance	
André da Silva	100 m	10.28	4 Q	10.34	8	Did not advance			
Jarbas Mascarenhas	100 m	10.34	4 Q	10.30	7	Did not advance			
Basílio de Moraes Júnior	200 m	21.14	8	Did not advance					
Cláudio Roberto Souza	200 m	20.70	4 Q	20.64	5	Did not advance			
Anderson Jorge dos Santos	400 m	48.77	8	—N/a		Did not advance			
Osmar dos Santos	800 m	1:45.90	4 Q	—N/a		1:48.23	7	Did not advance	
Hudson de Souza	1500 m	3:40.78	7 Q	—N/a		3:38.83	9	Did not advance	
Márcio de Souza	110 m hurdles	13.43	4 Q	13.54	5	Did not advance			
Redelén Melo dos Santos	110 m hurdles	DNS		Did not advance					
Matheus Inocêncio	110 m hurdles	13.45	2 Q	13.33	1 Q	13.34	4 Q	13.49	7
José Alessandro Bagio	20 km walk	—N/a						1:23:33	14
Mario José dos Santos	50 km walk	—N/a						4:20:11	40
Sérgio Galdino	50 km walk	—N/a						4:05:02	26
Vanderlei de Lima	Marathon	—N/a						2:12:11	3rd place, bronze medalist(s)
Andre Luiz Ramos	Marathon	—N/a						DNF	
Romulo Silva	Marathon	—N/a						DNF	
Vicente de Lima; André da Silva; Édson Ribeiro; Cláudio Roberto Souza	4 × 100 m relay	38.64	3 Q	—N/a				38.67	8

Field events

Athlete	Event	Qualification		Final	
Athlete	Event	Distance	Position	Distance	Position
Jessé de Lima	High jump	2.25	17	Did not advance	
Jadel Gregório	Long jump	7.50	32	Did not advance	
Jadel Gregório	Triple jump	17.20	5 Q	17.31	5

Women
Track & road events

Athlete	Event	Heat		Quarterfinal		Semifinal		Final	
Athlete	Event	Result	Rank	Result	Rank	Result	Rank	Result	Rank
Rosemar Coelho Neto	100 m	11.43	5 Q	11.45	7	Did not advance			
Lucimar de Moura	200 m	23.40	4 Q	23.44	8	Did not advance			
Maria Laura Almirao	400 m	52.10	5	—N/a		Did not advance			
Geisa Coutinho	400 m	52.18	5	—N/a		Did not advance			
Luciana de Paula Mendes	800 m	2:01.36	4 Q	—N/a		2:02.00	7	Did not advance	
Maíla Machado	100 m hurdles	13.35	6	—N/a		Did not advance			
Alessandra Picagevicz	20 km walk	—N/a						1:46:21	48
Marlene Fortunato	Marathon	—N/a						DNF	
Márcia Narloch	Marathon	—N/a						DNF	
Rosemar Coelho Neto; Katia de Jesus; Lucimar de Moura; Luciana dos Santos	4 × 100 m relay	43.12	4	—N/a				Did not advance	
Maria Laura Almirao; Geisa Coutinho; Lucimar Teodoro; Josiane Tito	4 × 400 m relay	3:28.43	6	—N/a				Did not advance	

Field events

Athlete	Event	Qualification		Final	
Athlete	Event	Distance	Position	Distance	Position
Elisângela Adriano	Shot put	17.44	17	Did not advance	
Elisângela Adriano	Discus throw	58.13	26	Did not advance	
Keila Costa	Long jump	6.33	31	Did not advance	

== Basketball ==
Summary

Team	Event	Group Stage						Quarterfinal	Semifinal	Final / BM	
Team	Event	Opposition Score	Opposition Score	Opposition Score	Opposition Score	Opposition Score	Rank	Opposition Score	Opposition Score	Opposition Score	Rank
Brazil women's	Women's tournament	Japan; W 128–62	Greece; W 87–75	Russia; L 77–67	Nigeria; W 82–63	Australia; L 66–84	3 Q	Spain; W 67–63	Australia; L 75–88	Russia; L 62–71	4

=== Women's tournament ===
Roster

The following is the Brazil roster in the women's basketball tournament of the 2004 Summer Olympics.

Brazil women's national basketball team – 2004 Summer Olympics roster
Players
Coaches

Pos.	No.	Name	Age – Date of birth	Height	Club	Ctr.
G	4	Adriana Moisés Pinto	25 – 6 December 1978	1.68 m (5 ft 6 in)	H.S. Penta Faenza	(Italy)
G	5	Helen Luz	31 – 23 November 1972	1.76 m (5 ft 9 in)	Dynamo Novosibirsk	(Russia)
G	6	Karla Costa	31 – 23 November 1972	1.76 m (5 ft 9 in)	Dynamo Novosibirsk	(Russia)
F/C	7	Leila Sobral	29 – 29 November 1974	1.89 m (6 ft 2 in)	São Paulo/Guaru	(Brazil)
F	8	Izi Castro Marques	22 – 13 March 1982	1.81 m (5 ft 11 in)	Phoenix Mercury	(United States)
F	9	Janeth Arcain (C)	35 – 11 April 1969	1.82 m (6 ft 0 in)	Phoenix Mercury	(United States)
G/F	10	Vivian Cristina Lopes	28 – 7 January 1976	1.74 m (5 ft 9 in)	Santo André/Semasa	(Brazil)
F	11	Silvia Cristina Rocha	22 – 14 May 1982	1.83 m (6 ft 0 in)	Unimed/Americana	(Brazil)
C	12	Érika de Souza	22 – 9 March 1982	1.97 m (6 ft 6 in)	UB-Barça	(Spain)
C	13	Alessandra de Oliveira	30 – 2 December 1973	2.00 m (6 ft 7 in)	Reyer Venezia Mestre	(Italy)
C	14	Cintia Santos	29 – 31 January 1975	1.96 m (6 ft 5 in)	Gambrinus Brno	(Czech Republic)
C	15	Kelly Santos	24 – 10 November 1979	1.93 m (6 ft 4 in)	CUS Chieti	(Italy)

Head coach

- (Brazil) Antonio Barbosa

Assistant coach(es)

- (Brazil) Paulo Campos

Legend

- nat field describes country
  of last club
  before the tournament
- Age as of August 13, 2004

Group play

Pos	Team	Pld	W	L	PF	PA	PD	Pts	Qualification
1	Australia	5	5	0	418	313	+105	10	Quarterfinals
2	Russia	5	4	1	389	333	+56	9	Quarterfinals
3	Brazil	5	3	2	430	361	+69	8	Quarterfinals
4	Greece (H)	5	2	3	353	392	−39	7	Quarterfinals
5	Japan	5	1	4	381	485	−104	6	
6	Nigeria	5	0	5	335	422	−87	5	

Source: FIBA archive
Rules for classification: 1) points; 2) head-to-head points; 3) head-to-head goal average; 4) head-to-head number of points scored.
(H) Hosts

14 August 2004
16:45

Japan	62–128	Brazil
Scoring by quarter: 22–26, 3–36, 17–33, 20–33
Pts: Hamaguchi 23; Rebs: Yano 5 Asts: Kusuda, Nagata 2		Pts: Oliveira 25; Rebs: Oliveira 13; Asts: Pinto 7

Helliniko Indoor Arena, Athens
Attendance: 950
Referees:
Giampaolo Cicoria (Italy)
Abreu Joao (Mozambique)

16 August 2004
20:00

Brazil	87–75	Greece
Scoring by quarter: 27–19, 23–24, 14–21, 23–11
Pts: Luz 18; Rebs: Oliveira 11; Asts: Three players 2		Pts: Maltsi 26; Rebs: Maltsi 10; Asts: Kostaki 7

Helliniko Indoor Arena, Athens
Attendance: 2,200
Referees:
Jorge Vazquez (Puerto Rico)
Philippe Leemann (Switzerland)

18 August 2004
20:00

Brazil	67–77	Russia
Scoring by quarter: 17–21, 11–25, 20–17, 19–14
Pts: Arcain 19; Rebs: Oliveira 8 Asts: Luz 5		Pts: Arkhipova 20; Rebs: Stepanova 9 Asts: Arkhipova 3

Olympic Indoor Hall, Athens
Attendance: 1,350
Referees:
Jose Carrión (Puerto Rico)
Chantal Julien (France)

20 August 2004
22:15

Nigeria	63–82	Brazil
Scoring by quarter: 19–33, 15–14, 12–11, 17–24
Pts: Udoka 17; Rebs: Udoka 7 Asts: Amachree, Udoka 2		Pts: Castro Marques 26; Rebs: de Souza 8 Asts: Castro Marques 6

Helliniko Indoor Arena, Athens
Attendance: 2,500
Referees:
Mike Homsy (Canada)
Song Yangping (China)

22 August 2004
14:30

Brazil	66–84	Australia
Scoring by quarter: 21–20, 14–20, 18–22, 13–22
Pts: Luz 16; Rebs: Oliveira 11; Asts: Castro Marques, Arcain 3		Pts: Jackson 24; Rebs: Snell 8 Asts: Fallon, Snell 3

Helliniko Indoor Arena, Athens
Attendance: 3,450
Referees:
Corbin Sean (United States)
Giampaolo Cicoria (Italy)

Quarterfinal

25 August 2004
20:00

Spain	63–67	Brazil
Scoring by quarter: 16–14, 18–20, 12–15, 17–18
Pts: M. Fernández 16; Rebs: Pascua 6 Asts: Palau 3		Pts: Arcain 27; Rebs: Oliveira, Sobral 8 Asts: Luz 3

Olympic Indoor Hall, Athens
Attendance: 13,500
Referees:
Lazaros Voreadis (Greece)
Nancy Ethier (Brazil)

Semifinal

27 August 2004
16:45

Brazil	75–88	Australia
Scoring by quarter: 21–21, 15–21, 20–21, 19–25
Pts: Castro Marques 25; Rebs: Oliveira 8 Asts: Luz 2		Pts: Jackson 26; Rebs: Jackson 13; Asts: Harrower 4

Olympic Indoor Hall, Athens
Attendance: 4,150
Referees:
Jorge Vazquez (Puerto Rico)
Virginijus Dovidavicius (Lithuania)

Bronze Medal Final

28 August 2004
14:00

Russia	71–62	Brazil
Scoring by quarter: 18–20, 14–12, 15–14, 24–16
Pts: Goustilina 12; Rebs: Osipova 10; Asts: Arkhipova, Baranova 4		Pts: Castro Marques 16; Rebs: Oliveira 9 Asts: Castro Marques 6

Olympic Indoor Hall, Athens
Attendance: 7,250
Referees:
Corbin Sean (United States)
Nancy Ethier (Canada)

== Boxing ==
Athlete	Event	Round of 32	Round of 16	Quarterfinals	Semifinals	Final	
Athlete	Event	Opposition Result	Opposition Result	Opposition Result	Opposition Result	Opposition Result	Rank
Edvaldo Oliveira	Featherweight	Velásquez (PUR); W 43^{+}–43	Franco (CUB); L 15–30	Did not advance			
Myke Carvalho	Lightweight	de Jesús (PUR); L 24–39	Did not advance				
Alessandro Matos	Light welterweight	Bye	Mahmudov (UZB); L 16–26	Did not advance			
Glaucelio Abreu	Middleweight	Kassel (ALG); L 36–41	Did not advance				
Washington Silva	Light heavyweight	Ismailov (AZE); L 22–27	Did not advance				

== Canoeing ==
=== Sprint ===
Athlete	Event	Heats		Semifinals		Final	
Athlete	Event	Time	Rank	Time	Rank	Time	Rank
Sebastián Cuattrin	Men's K-1 500 m	1:40.999	5 QS	1:42.213	8	Did not advance	
Sebastián Cuattrin	Men's K-1 1000 m	3:36.506	5 QS	3:37.682	7	Did not advance	
Sebastian Cuattrin; Sebastian Szubski	Men's K-2 500 m	1:35.917	6 QS	1:37.466	8	Did not advance	

Qualification Legend: QF = Qualify to final; QS = Qualify to semifinal

== Cycling ==
=== Road ===
Men

Athlete	Event	Time	Rank
Murilo Fischer	Men's road race	5:50:35	62
Márcio May	Men's road race	Did not finish	
Luciano Pagliarini	Men's road race	Did not finish	

Women

Athlete	Event	Time	Rank
Janildes Fernandes	Women's road race	3:40:43	54

=== Mountain biking ===
Men

Athlete	Event	Time	Rank
Edvandro Cruz	Men's cross-country	2:30:35	33

Women

Athlete	Event	Time	Rank
Jaqueline Mourão	Women's cross-country	2:13:52	18

== Diving ==
Men

Athlete	Events	Preliminaries		Semifinals		Final	
Athlete	Events	Points	Rank	Points	Rank	Points	Rank
César Castro	3 m springboard	432.45	9 Q	662.73	9 Q	662.97	9
Cassius Duran	10 m platform	387.75	24	Did not advance			
Hugo Parisi	10 m platform	325.08	32	Did not advance			

Women

Athlete	Events	Preliminaries		Semifinals		Final	
Athlete	Events	Points	Rank	Points	Rank	Points	Rank
Juliana Veloso	3 m springboard	265.29	18 Q	462.45	18	Did not advance	
Juliana Veloso	10 m platform	302.31	16 Q	469.95	16	Did not advance	

== Equestrian ==
Brazil has qualified two teams in eventing and jumping. Show jumper Rodrigo Pessoa originally claimed a silver medal in men's show jumping. On October 8, 2004, International Federation for Equestrian Sports announced that Waterford Crystal, owned by Ireland's Cian O'Connor, failed a horse doping test for fluphenazine and zuclopenthixol that formally stripped off O'Connor's Olympic title in early 2005. Pessoa was eventually presented with his gold medal at a ceremony on Copacabana Beach in August 2005.

=== Eventing ===
Athlete	Horse	Event	Dressage		Cross-country			Jumping						Total	
Athlete	Horse	Event	Dressage		Cross-country			Qualifier			Final			Total	
Athlete	Horse	Event	Penalties	Rank	Penalties	Total	Rank	Penalties	Total	Rank	Penalties	Total	Rank	Penalties	Rank
Rafael Gouveia Jr.	Mozart	Individual	65.80	59	4.80	70.60	39	30.00	100.60	47	Did not advance			100.60	47
Sergio Marins	Rally LF	Individual	70.00	=66	16.00	86.00	50	19.00	105.00	50	Did not advance			105.00	50
Andre Paro	Land Heir	Individual	70.00	=66	16.80 #	86.80	51	37.00 #	123.80 #	54	Did not advance			123.80	54
Raul Senna	Super Rocky	Individual	76.00 #	73	14.40	90.40 #	55	5.00	95.40	44	Did not advance			95.40	44
Remo Tellini	Especial Reserve	Individual	79.60 #	74	17.60 #	97.20 #	57	51.00 #	148.20 #	59	Did not advance			148.20	59
Rafael Gouveia Jr. Sergio Marins; Andre Paro; Raul Senna; Remo Tellini	See above	Team	205.80	14	35.20	243.40	9	54.00	301.00	13	—N/a			301.00	11

"#" indicates that the score of this rider does not count in the team competition, since only the best three results of a team are counted.

=== Show jumping ===
Athlete	Horse	Event	Qualification								Final					Total	
Athlete	Horse	Event	Round 1		Round 2			Round 3			Round A		Round B			Total	
Athlete	Horse	Event	Penalties	Rank	Penalties	Total	Rank	Penalties	Total	Rank	Penalties	Rank	Penalties	Total	Rank	Penalties	Rank
Bernardo Alves	Canturo	Individual	1	=11	8	9	=23	Did not advance									
Álvaro de Miranda Neto	Countdown 23	Individual	8	=47	8	16	=40 Q	12	28	=41 Q	8	=12 Q	Eliminated			8	=12
Luciana Diniz	Mariachi	Individual	5	=31	13	18	44 Q	16	34	49 Q	20	=40	Did not advance			20	=40
Rodrigo Pessoa	Baloubet du Rouet	Individual	5	=31	0	5	12 Q	9	14	18 Q	8	=12 Q	0	8	=2	8	(gold) *
Bernardo Alves; Álvaro de Miranda Neto; Luciana Diniz; Rodrigo Pessoa	See above	Team	—N/a								16	6	37	53	9	53	9

*Won in jump-off

== Fencing ==
Men

Athlete	Event	Round of 64	Round of 32	Round of 16	Quarterfinal	Semifinal	Final / BM	
Athlete	Event	Opposition Score	Opposition Score	Opposition Score	Opposition Score	Opposition Score	Opposition Score	Rank
Renzo Agresta	Individual sabre	Rebai (TUN); W 15–14	Lukashenko (UKR); L 14–15	Did not advance				

Women

Athlete	Event	Round of 32	Round of 16	Quarterfinal	Semifinal	Final / BM	
Athlete	Event	Opposition Score	Opposition Score	Opposition Score	Opposition Score	Opposition Score	Rank
Maria de Castro Herklotz	Individual foil	Nam H-H (KOR); L 6–15	Did not advance				
Élora Pattaro	Individual sabre	Jemayeva (AZE); L 8–15	Did not advance				

== Football ==
Summary

Key:

- A.E.T – After extra time.
- P – Match decided by penalty-shootout.

Team	Event	Group Stage				Quarterfinal	Semifinal	Final / BM	
Team	Event	Opposition Score	Opposition Score	Opposition Score	Rank	Opposition Score	Opposition Score	Opposition Score	Rank
Brazil women's	Women's tournament	Australia; W 1–0	United States; L 0–2	Greece; W 7–0	2 Q	Mexico; W 5–0	Sweden; W 1–0	United States; L 1–2 (a.e.t.)	2nd place, silver medalist(s)

=== Women's tournament ===
Roster

Head coach: René Simões

Brazil named a squad of 18 players and 1 alternate for the tournament. During the tournament, Dayane replaced Kelly due to injury.

No.	Pos.	Player	Date of birth (age)	Caps	Goals	Club
1	GK	Maravilha	10 April 1973 (aged 31)			(Brazilian Football Confederation) Grêmio
2	FW	Grazielle	28 March 1981 (aged 23)			(Brazilian Football Confederation) Botucatu FC
3	DF	Mônica	4 April 1978 (aged 26)	0	2	(Brazilian Football Confederation) Ferroviária
4	DF	Tânia	3 October 1974 (aged 29)	22	3	(Royal Spanish Football Federation) Rayo Vallecano
5	DF	Juliana (captain)	3 October 1981 (aged 22)	18	4	(Swedish Football Association) Kopparberg/Göteborg FC
6	DF	Renata Costa	8 July 1986 (aged 18)	3	1	(Brazilian Football Confederation) Santos FC
7	MF	Formiga	3 March 1978 (aged 26)	12	8	(Swedish Football Association) LdB FC Malmö
8	DF	Daniela	12 January 1984 (aged 20)	6	7	(Swedish Football Association) Kopparberg/Göteborg FC
9	FW	Pretinha	19 May 1975 (aged 29)			Unattached
10	FW	Marta	19 February 1986 (aged 18)	13	2	(Swedish Football Association) Umeå IK
11	DF	Rosana	7 July 1982 (aged 22)	5	1	(Brazilian Football Confederation) Internacional
12	FW	Cristiane	15 May 1985 (aged 19)	4	8	(Brazilian Football Confederation) Juventus
13	DF	Aline	6 July 1982 (aged 22)			(Brazilian Football Confederation) UniSant'anna
14	MF	Elaine	1 November 1982 (aged 21)	2	4	(Brazilian Football Confederation) Ferroviária
15	MF	Maycon	30 April 1977 (aged 27)	8	2	(Brazilian Football Confederation) Grêmio
16	FW	Kelly	8 May 1985 (aged 19)			
17	FW	Roseli	7 September 1969 (aged 34)	12	8	Unattached
18	GK	Andréia	14 September 1977 (aged 26)	15	0	(Royal Spanish Football Federation) Puebla de la Calzada
21	FW	Dayane	13 May 1985 (aged 19)			(Brazilian Football Confederation) Novo Mundo

Group play

Pos	Team	Pld	W	D	L	GF	GA	GD	Pts	Qualification
1	United States	3	2	1	0	6	1	+5	7	Qualified for the quarterfinals
2	Brazil	3	2	0	1	8	2	+6	6	Qualified for the quarterfinals
3	Australia	3	1	1	1	2	2	0	4	Qualified for the quarterfinals
4	Greece	3	0	0	3	0	11	−11	0	

August 11, 2004
18:00

Brazil	1–0	Australia
Marta 36'	Report

Kaftanzoglio Stadium, Thessaloniki
Attendance: 25.152
Referee: Damková (Czech Republic)
August 14, 2004
20:30

United States	2–0	Brazil
Hamm 58' (pen.); Wambach 77'	Report

Kaftanzoglio Stadium, Thessaloniki
Attendance: 17.123
Referee: Damkova (Czech Republic)
August 17, 2004
20:30

Greece	0–7	Brazil
	Report	Pretinha 21'; Cristiane 46', 55', 77'; Grazielle 49'; Marta 70'; Daniela 72'

Pampeloponnisiako Stadium, Patras
Attendance: 7.214
Referee: Frai (Germany)

Quarterfinal

August 20, 2004
21:00

Mexico	0–5	Brazil
	Report	Cristiane 25', 49'; Formiga 29', 54'; Marta 60'

Pankritio Stadium, Heraklio
Attendance: 3.012
Referee: Gaye (Senegal)

Semifinal

August 23, 2004
18:00

Brazil	1–0	Sweden
Pretinha 64'	Report

Pampeloponnisiako Stadium, Patras
Attendance: 1.511
Referee: Ferreira-James (Guyana)

Gold Medal Final

26 August 2004
21:00

United States	2 – 1 (a.e.t.)	Brazil
Tarpley 39'; Wambach 112'	Report	Pretinha 73'

Karaiskaki Stadium, Piraeus
Attendance: 10,416
Referee: Jenny Palmqvist (Sweden)

Won Silver Medal

== Gymnastics ==
=== Artistic ===
Brazil qualified a women's team and an individual man.

Men

Athlete	Event	Qualification								Final							
Athlete	Event	Apparatus						Total	Rank	Apparatus						Total	Rank
Athlete	Event	F	PH	R	V	PB	HB	Total	Rank	F	PH	R	V	PB	HB	Total	Rank
Mosiah Rodrigues	All-around	9.075	9.600	8.600	9.262	8.800	9.562	54.899	33	Did not advance							

Women
Team

Athlete	Event	Qualification						Final					
Athlete	Event	Apparatus				Total	Rank	Apparatus				Total	Rank
Athlete	Event	V	UB	BB	F	Total	Rank	V	UB	BB	F	Total	Rank
Camila Comin	Team	9.200	9.412	8.662	9.137	36.411	26 Q	Did not advance					
Daiane dos Santos	Team	9.250	8.800	—N/a	9.637 Q	—N/a		Did not advance					
Daniele Hypólito	Team	8.987	9.575	9.337	9.187	37.086	16 Q	Did not advance					
Caroline Molinari	Team	—N/a		7.512	—N/a			Did not advance					
Ana Paula Rodrigues	Team	9.087	9.375	8.887	9.037	36.386	27	Did not advance					
Laís Souza	Team	9.387	8.762	9.375	8.675	36.199	34	Did not advance					
Total	Team	36.924	37.162	36.261	36.998	147.345	9	Did not advance					

Individual finals

Athlete	Event	Apparatus				Total	Rank
Athlete	Event	V	UB	BB	F	Total	Rank
Camila Comin	All-around	9.187	9.437	8.525	8.925	36.074	16
Daiane dos Santos	Floor	—N/a			9.375	9.375	5
Daniele Hypólito	All-around	8.825	9.562	9.337	9.237	36.961	12

=== Rhythmic ===
Athlete	Event	Qualification				Final			
Athlete	Event	5 ribbons	3 hoops 2 balls	Total	Rank	5 ribbons	3 hoops 2 balls	Total	Rank
Larissa Barata; Dayane Camilo; Fernanda Cavalieri; Ana Maria Maciel; Tayanne Mantovaneli; Jennifer Oliveira	Team	21.450	23.500	44.950	7 Q	21.900	22.500	44.400	8

== Handball ==
Summary

Key:

- ET: After Extra Time
- P – Match decided by penalty-shootout.

Team	Event	Group Stage						Quarterfinal	Semifinal	Final / BM	
Team	Event	Opposition Score	Opposition Score	Opposition Score	Opposition Score	Opposition Score	Rank	Opposition Score	Opposition Score	Opposition Score	Rank
Brazil men's	Men's tournament	France; L 17–31	Hungary; L 19–20	Germany; L 21–34	Greece; L 22–26	Egypt; W 26–22	5	Did not advance			10
Brazil women's	Women's tournament	Greece; W 29–21	Ukraine; L 19–21	Hungary; L 26–35	China; L 23–28		4 Q	South Korea; L 24–26	Did not advance		7

=== Men's tournament ===
Roster

The following is the Brazil roster in the men's handball tournament of the 2004 Summer Olympics.

Head coach: Valmir Fassina

No.	Pos.	Name	Date of birth (age)	Height	App.	Goals	Club
2	LB	Jaqson Kojoroski	3 January 1979 (aged 25)	1.91 m			(Brazil) IMES
4	RW	Adalberto Silva	12 May 1979 (aged 25)	1.89 m			(Brazil) Metodista
5	RB	José Nascimento	16 March 1966 (aged 38)	1.84 m			(Brazil) Metodista
6	LW	Jair Henrique Alves Junior	1 October 1978 (aged 25)	1.83 m			(Brazil) Unifil Londrina
7	RW	Renato Tupan Ruy	7 June 1979 (aged 25)	1.86 m			(Germany) HSC Landwehrhagen
8	LB	Bruno Souza	27 June 1977 (aged 27)	1.91 m			(Germany) FA Göppingen
9	LB	Agberto Matos	8 April 1972 (aged 32)	1.93 m			(Brazil) Metodista
10	RW	Hélio Justino	23 July 1972 (aged 32)	1.84 m			(Brazil) Metodista
11	P	Daniel Baldacin	6 May 1977 (aged 27)	1.90 m			(Brazil) Metodista
12	GK	Alexandre Vasconcelos	19 December 1978 (aged 25)	1.94 m			(Brazil) IMES
14	CB	Ivan Bruno Maziero	1 June 1969 (aged 35)	1.81 m			(Brazil) Metodista
15	RB	Eduardo Henrique Reis	7 March 1970 (aged 34)	1.90 m			(Brazil) IMES
16	GK	Marcos Paulo Santos	26 May 1976 (aged 28)	1.84 m			(Brazil) Metodista
18	CB	Bruno Santana	27 February 1982 (aged 22)	1.83 m			(Brazil) EC Pinheiros
20	CB	Gustavo Henrique Silva	28 April 1979 (aged 25)	1.90 m			(Brazil) EC Pinheiros

Group play

Pos	Team	Pld	W	D	L	GF	GA	GD	Pts	Qualification
1	France	5	5	0	0	135	108	+27	10	Quarterfinals
2	Hungary	5	4	0	1	132	124	+8	8	Quarterfinals
3	Germany	5	3	0	2	139	110	+29	6	Quarterfinals
4	Greece (H)	5	2	0	3	117	130	−13	4	Quarterfinals
5	Brazil	5	1	0	4	105	133	−28	2	
6	Egypt	5	0	0	5	110	133	−23	0	

Rules for classification: 1) Points; 2) Head-to-head points; 3) Head-to-head goal difference; 4) Head-to-head goals scored; 5) Goal difference; 6) Goals scored; 7) Draw.
(H) Hosts

14 August 2004; 21:30	France	31–17	Brazil	Sports Pavilion, Athens; Referees: Arnaldsson, Vidarsson (ISL)
14 August 2004; 21:30	Anquetil 7	(14–10)	Silva 6	Sports Pavilion, Athens; Referees: Arnaldsson, Vidarsson (ISL)
14 August 2004; 21:30	3× (yellow card) 4× (suspension)		2× (yellow card) 6× (suspension)	Sports Pavilion, Athens; Referees: Arnaldsson, Vidarsson (ISL)

16 August 2004; 19:30	Brazil	19–20	Hungary	Sports Pavilion, Athens; Referees: Nachevski, Nachevski (MKD)
16 August 2004; 19:30	Souza 5	(10–10)	4 players with 3	Sports Pavilion, Athens; Referees: Nachevski, Nachevski (MKD)
16 August 2004; 19:30	3× (yellow card) 4× (suspension)		3× (yellow card) 4× (suspension)	Sports Pavilion, Athens; Referees: Nachevski, Nachevski (MKD)

18 August 2004; 21:30	Germany	34–21	Brazil	Sports Pavilion, Athens; Referees: Pozeznik, Repensek (SLO)
18 August 2004; 21:30	Kretzschmar, Stephan 7	(18–12)	Souza 7	Sports Pavilion, Athens; Referees: Pozeznik, Repensek (SLO)
18 August 2004; 21:30	2× (yellow card) 3× (suspension)		3× (yellow card) 3× (suspension)	Sports Pavilion, Athens; Referees: Pozeznik, Repensek (SLO)

15 August 2004; 14:30	Brazil	22–26	Greece	Sports Pavilion, Athens; Referees: Arnaldsson, Vidarsson (ISL)
15 August 2004; 14:30	Justino 6	(9–13)	Grammatikos 7	Sports Pavilion, Athens; Referees: Arnaldsson, Vidarsson (ISL)
15 August 2004; 14:30	3× (yellow card) 4× (suspension)		3× (yellow card) 3× (suspension)	Sports Pavilion, Athens; Referees: Arnaldsson, Vidarsson (ISL)

22 August 2004; 21:30	Egypt	22–26	Brazil	Sports Pavilion, Athens; Referees: Hansson, Olsson (SWE)
22 August 2004; 21:30	Abdel Salam 5	(11–10)	Kojoroski 6	Sports Pavilion, Athens; Referees: Hansson, Olsson (SWE)
22 August 2004; 21:30	2× (yellow card) 3× (suspension)		2× (yellow card) 7× (suspension) 1× (red card)	Sports Pavilion, Athens; Referees: Hansson, Olsson (SWE)

9th–10th Classification

24 August 2004; 11:30	Brazil	25–29	Iceland	Sports Pavilion, Athens; Referees: Hassan, Aly (EGY)
24 August 2004; 11:30	Tupan, Souza 6	(11–13)	Sigurdsson 8	Sports Pavilion, Athens; Referees: Hassan, Aly (EGY)
24 August 2004; 11:30	3× (yellow card) 5× (suspension) 1× (red card)		4× (yellow card) 2× (suspension)	Sports Pavilion, Athens; Referees: Hassan, Aly (EGY)

=== Women's tournament ===
Roster

The following is the Brazil roster in the women's handball tournament of the 2004 Summer Olympics.

Head coach: Alexandre Schneider

No.	Pos.	Name	Date of birth (age)	Height	App.	Goals	Club
1	GK	Chana Masson	18 December 1978 (aged 25)	1.84 m			(Denmark) FC Copenhagen
2	P	Fabiana Diniz	13 May 1981 (aged 23)	1.83 m			(Portugal) CDES Gil Eanes
3	RW	Alexandra do Nascimento	16 September 1981 (aged 22)	1.77 m			(Austria) Hypo NÖ
4	CB	Margareth Montão	19 July 1971 (aged 33)	1.78 m			(Brazil) MAUA Universo
5	P	Daniela Piedade	2 February 1979 (aged 25)	1.73 m			(Austria) Hypo NÖ
6	CB	Fabiana Kuestener	15 April 1981 (aged 23)	1.75 m			(Brazil) AD Blumenau
8	LB	Ana Amorim	1 April 1983 (aged 21)	1.81 m			(North Macedonia) Kometal Gjorče
9	CB	Milene Figueiredo	3 February 1983 (aged 21)	1.84 m			(Brazil) Aguias Nova Gerty
10	LW	Aline Rosas	28 June 1979 (aged 25)	1.59 m			(Brazil) Guaru
11	RW	Viviane Jacques	20 May 1977 (aged 27)	1.71 m			(Brazil) MESC São Paulo
13	CB	Lucila Silva	7 March 1976 (aged 28)	1.73 m			(Brazil) Guaru
15	LB	Aline Silva	25 May 1979 (aged 25)	1.76 m			(Portugal) CDES Gil Eanes
16	GK	Darly de Paula	25 August 1982 (aged 21)	1.82 m			(Spain) Akaba Bera Bera
17	LW	Idalina Mesquita	25 August 1982 (aged 21)	1.83 m			(Brazil) MAUA Universo
19	LB	Aline Santos	17 August 1981 (aged 22)	1.95 m			(Spain) El Ferrobus Mislata

Group play

Pos	Team	Pld	W	D	L	GF	GA	GD	Pts	Qualification
1	Ukraine	4	4	0	0	99	82	+17	8	Quarterfinals
2	Hungary	4	3	0	1	118	93	+25	6	Quarterfinals
3	China	4	2	0	2	106	90	+16	4	Quarterfinals
4	Brazil	4	1	0	3	97	105	−8	2	Quarterfinals
5	Greece (H)	4	0	0	4	74	124	−50	0	

Rules for classification: 1) Points; 2) Head-to-head points; 3) Head-to-head goal difference; 4) Head-to-head goals scored; 5) Goal difference; 6) Goals scored; 7) Draw.
(H) Hosts

15 August 2004; 16:30	Greece	21–29	Brazil	Sports Pavilion, Athens; Referees: Baum, Goralczyk (POL)
15 August 2004; 16:30	Gioupi 6	(8–14)	Piedade 7	Sports Pavilion, Athens; Referees: Baum, Goralczyk (POL)
15 August 2004; 16:30	3× (yellow card) 7× (suspension)		3× (yellow card) 5× (suspension)	Sports Pavilion, Athens; Referees: Baum, Goralczyk (POL)

19 August 2004; 19:30	Brazil	19–21	Ukraine	Sports Pavilion, Athens; Referees: Gardinovacki, Maric (SCG)
19 August 2004; 19:30	A. Silva 6	(10–10)	Yatsenko, Lyapina 5	Sports Pavilion, Athens; Referees: Gardinovacki, Maric (SCG)
19 August 2004; 19:30	3× (yellow card) 4× (suspension)		3× (yellow card) 4× (suspension)	Sports Pavilion, Athens; Referees: Gardinovacki, Maric (SCG)

21 August 2004; 21:30	Brazil	26–35	Hungary	Sports Pavilion, Athens; Referees: Breto, Huelin Trillo (ESP)
21 August 2004; 21:30	A. Silva 8	(14–19)	Radulovics 10	Sports Pavilion, Athens; Referees: Breto, Huelin Trillo (ESP)
21 August 2004; 21:30	3× (yellow card) 4× (suspension)		3× (yellow card) 5× (suspension)	Sports Pavilion, Athens; Referees: Breto, Huelin Trillo (ESP)

23 August 2004; 16:30	China	28–23	Brazil	Sports Pavilion, Athens; Referees: Boye, Jensen (DEN)
23 August 2004; 16:30	Zhai Chao 10	(11–13)	Nascimento 5	Sports Pavilion, Athens; Referees: Boye, Jensen (DEN)
23 August 2004; 16:30	3× (yellow card) 3× (suspension)		3× (yellow card) 4× (suspension)	Sports Pavilion, Athens; Referees: Boye, Jensen (DEN)

Quarterfinal

26 August 2004; 19:30	South Korea	26–24	Brazil	Helliniko Indoor Arena; Referees: Breto, Huelin Trillo (ESP)
26 August 2004; 19:30	Lee S. 7	(16–9)	L. Silva 7	Helliniko Indoor Arena; Referees: Breto, Huelin Trillo (ESP)
26 August 2004; 19:30	3× (yellow card) 6× (suspension)		3× (yellow card) 6× (suspension)	Helliniko Indoor Arena; Referees: Breto, Huelin Trillo (ESP)

5th–8th Classification Semifinal

28 August 2004; 11:30	Hungary	36–31	Brazil	Helliniko Indoor Arena; Referees: Nachevski, Nachevski (MKD)
28 August 2004; 11:30	Radulovics 7	(17–14)	Santos 9	Helliniko Indoor Arena; Referees: Nachevski, Nachevski (MKD)
28 August 2004; 11:30	3× (yellow card) 2× (suspension)		3× (yellow card) 3× (suspension)	Helliniko Indoor Arena; Referees: Nachevski, Nachevski (MKD)

7th–8th Place Final

29 August 2004; 08:30	China	25–26	Brazil	Helliniko Indoor Arena; Referees: Breto, Huelin Trillo (ESP)
29 August 2004; 08:30	Li Weiwei 7	(10–13)	A. Silva 6	Helliniko Indoor Arena; Referees: Breto, Huelin Trillo (ESP)
29 August 2004; 08:30	2× (yellow card) 4× (suspension)		3× (yellow card) 3× (suspension)	Helliniko Indoor Arena; Referees: Breto, Huelin Trillo (ESP)

== Judo ==
Men

Athlete	Event	Preliminary	Round of 32	Round of 16	Quarterfinals	Semifinals	Repechage 1	Repechage 2	Repechage 3	Final / BM	
Athlete	Event	Opposition Result	Opposition Result	Opposition Result	Opposition Result	Opposition Result	Opposition Result	Opposition Result	Opposition Result	Opposition Result	Rank
Alexandre Lee	−60 kg	Bye	Nazaryan (ARM); L 0001–0101	Did not advance							
Henrique Guimarães	−66 kg	—N/a	Bang (KOR); W 1001–0000	Dzhafarov (RUS); L 0010–0101	Did not advance						
Leandro Guilheiro	−73 kg	Uematsu (ESP); W 0010–0000	Laraque (HAI); W 1001–0000	Wiłkomirski (POL); W 0110–0011	Fernandes (FRA); L 0010–0101	Did not advance	Bye	Razvozov (ISR); W 1001–0020	Kevkhishvili (GEO); W 0001–0000	Bivol (MDA); W 0200–0000	3rd place, bronze medalist(s)
Flávio Canto	−81 kg	—N/a	Valles (COL); W 1000–0000	Budõlin (EST); W 0011–0010	Nossov (RUS); L 0010–0110	Did not advance	Bye	Meloni (ITA); W 0200–0001	Kwon (KOR); W 1000–0000	Krawczyk (POL); W 0110–0011	3rd place, bronze medalist(s)
Carlos Honorato	−90 kg	—N/a	Meddah (ALG); W 1000–0000	Ochirbat (MGL); W 0101–0100	Gordon (GBR); L 0010–0012	Did not advance	Bye	Kelly (AUS); L 0010–0011	Did not advance		
Mário Sabino	−100 kg	Bye	Ze'evi (ISR); L 0100–1010	Did not advance							
Daniel Hernandes	+100 kg	Bye	Onyemachi (NGR); W 0100–0000	Tmenov (RUS); L 0000–1110	Did not advance		Munteanu (ROM); W 1000–0000	Pertelson (EST); L 0100–1110	Did not advance		

Women

Athlete	Event	Round of 32	Round of 16	Quarterfinals	Semifinals	Repechage 1	Repechage 2	Repechage 3	Final / BM	
Athlete	Event	Opposition Result	Opposition Result	Opposition Result	Opposition Result	Opposition Result	Opposition Result	Opposition Result	Opposition Result	Rank
Daniela Polzin	−48 kg	Gao F (CHN); L 0000–1110	Did not advance							
Fabiane Hukuda	−52 kg	Singleton (GBR); L 0000–1001	Did not advance							
Danielle Zangrando	−57 kg	Bye	Liu Yx (CHN); W 1000–0011	Gravenstijn (NED); L 0010–1010	Did not advance	Bye	Cavazzuti (ITA); L 0010–0000	Did not advance		
Vânia Ishii	−63 kg	Vandecaveye (BEL); L 0000–1000	Did not advance							
Edinanci Silva	−78 kg	Bye	Ben Daya (TUN); W 1020–0001	Lebrun (FRA); L 0000–0001	Did not advance	Bye	Kubes (USA); W 0200–0001	Morico (ITA); L 0011–0120	Did not advance	

== Modern pentathlon ==
Brazil has qualified a single spot each in the men's and women's event.

Athlete	Event	Shooting (10 m air pistol)			Fencing (épée one touch)			Swimming (200 m freestyle)			Riding (show jumping)			Running (3000 m)			Total points	Final rank
Athlete	Event	Points	Rank	MP Points	Results	Rank	MP points	Time	Rank	MP points	Penalties	Rank	MP points	Time	Rank	MP Points	Total points	Final rank
Daniel dos Santos	Men's	163	31	892	14–17	=19	776	2:16.52	30	1164	84	10	1116	10:54.15	30	784	4732	29
Samantha Harvey	Women's	178	8	1072	17–14	=7	860	2:27.35	23	1152	224	26	976	12:03.10	30	828	4888	25

== Rowing ==
Men

Athlete	Event	Heats		Repechage		Semifinals		Final	
Athlete	Event	Time	Rank	Time	Rank	Time	Rank	Time	Rank
Anderson Nocetti	Single sculls	7:26.81	3 R	7:03.08	2 SA/B/C	7:11.90	5 FC	6:53.64	13
Thiago Gomes; José Sobral Júnior	Lightweight double sculls	6:33.92	6 R	6:33.66	4 SC/D	6:26.98	4	Did not advance	

Women

Athlete	Event	Heats		Repechage		Semifinals		Final	
Athlete	Event	Time	Rank	Time	Rank	Time	Rank	Time	Rank
Fabiana Beltrame	Single sculls	8:02.09	4 R	7:48.74	4 SC/D	8:00.89	1 FC	7:43.38	14

Qualification Legend: FA=Final A (medal); FB=Final B (non-medal); FC=Final C (non-medal); FD=Final D (non-medal); FE=Final E (non-medal); FF=Final F (non-medal); SA/B=Semifinals A/B; SC/D=Semifinals C/D; SE/F=Semifinals E/F; R=Repechage

== Sailing ==
Men

Athlete	Event	Race											Net points	Final rank
Athlete	Event	1	2	3	4	5	6	7	8	9	10	M*	Net points	Final rank
Ricardo Santos	Mistral	4	6	2	1	5	~~17~~	7	2	9	1	17	54	4
João Signorini	Finn	15	9	~~21~~	15	21	4	5	6	12	9	17	113	10
Bernardo Arndt; Alexandre Paradeda	470	5	1	14	19	4	10	17	20	~~24~~	9	5	104	8
Marcelo Ferreira; Torben Grael	Star	5	4	1	1	2	5	2	7	11	4	~~DNS~~	42	1st place, gold medalist(s)

Women

Athlete	Event	Race											Net points	Final rank
Athlete	Event	1	2	3	4	5	6	7	8	9	10	M*	Net points	Final rank
Carolina Borges	Mistral	~~25~~	20	24	24	21	23	24	24	25	22	22	229	25
Adriana Kostiw; Fernanda Oliveira	470	~~OCS~~	18	19	16	16	3	6	15	15	5	6	119	17

Open

Athlete	Event	Race																Net points	Final rank
Athlete	Event	1	2	3	4	5	6	7	8	9	10	11	12	13	14	15	M*	Net points	Final rank
Robert Scheidt	Laser	3	8	1	3	8	4	~~19~~	12	7	3	—N/a					6	55	1st place, gold medalist(s)
Rodrigo Duarte; André Fonseca	49er	2	4	~~13~~	13	3	3	5	12	10	12	5	~~15~~	12	10	8	5	104	6
João Carlos Jordão; Maurício Oliveira	Tornado	13	~~17~~	16	15	16	17	17	16	13	16	—N/a					16	155	17

M = Medal race; OCS = On course side of the starting line; DSQ = Disqualified; DNF = Did not finish; DNS= Did not start; RDG = Redress given

== Shooting ==
Men

Athlete	Event	Qualification		Final	
Athlete	Event	Points	Rank	Points	Rank
Rodrigo Bastos	Trap	117	=14	Did not advance	

== Swimming ==
Brazilian swimmers earned qualifying standards in the following events (up to a maximum of 2 swimmers in each event at the A-standard time, and 1 at the B-standard time):

Men

Athlete	Event	Heat		Semifinal		Final	
Athlete	Event	Result	Rank	Result	Rank	Result	Rank
Fernando Scherer	50 m freestyle	22.52	15 Q	22.27	11	Did not advance	
Jader Souza	100 m freestyle	50.67	33	Did not advance			
Rodrigo Castro	200 m freestyle	1:50.27	20	Did not advance			
Bruno Bonfim	400 m freestyle	3:59.96	34	—N/a		Did not advance	
Paulo Machado	100 m backstroke	57.07	32	Did not advance			
Rogério Romero	200 m backstroke	2:00.60	11 Q	2:00.48	15	Did not advance	
Rogério Romero	200 m breaststroke	2:16.04	24	Did not advance			
Eduardo Fischer	100 m breaststroke	1:01.84	11 Q	1:02.07	15	Did not advance	
Gabriel Mangabeira	100 m butterfly	52.76	11 Q	52.33	5 Q	52.34	6
Kaio de Almeida	100 m butterfly	53.22	17	Did not advance			
Kaio de Almeida	200 m butterfly	1:59.23	19	Did not advance			
Diogo Yabe	200 m individual medley	2:03.86	26	Did not advance			
Thiago Pereira	200 m individual medley	2:01.12	5 Q	2:00.07	4 Q	2:00.11	5
Thiago Pereira	400 m individual medley	4:22.06	17	—N/a		Did not advance	
Lucas Salatta	400 m individual medley	4:23.01	19	—N/a		Did not advance	
Gustavo Borges; Rodrigo Castro; Carlos Jayme; Jader Souza	4 × 100 m freestyle relay	3:20.20	12	—N/a		Did not advance	
Bruno Bonfim; Rodrigo Castro; Carlos Jayme; Rafael Mosca	4 × 200 m freestyle relay	7:22.70	9	—N/a		Did not advance	
Kaio de Almeida; Eduardo Fischer; Paulo Machado; Jader Souza	4 × 100 m medley relay	3:44.41	15	—N/a		Did not advance	

Women

Athlete	Event	Heat		Semifinal		Final	
Athlete	Event	Result	Rank	Result	Rank	Result	Rank
Flávia Cazziolato	50 m freestyle	25.40	9 Q	25.17	8 Q	25.20	8
Rebeca Gusmão	50 m freestyle	25.64	14 Q	25.31	11	Did not advance	
Rebeca Gusmão	100 m freestyle	56.26	20	Did not advance			
Mariana Brochado	200 m freestyle	2:02.91	23	Did not advance			
Monique Ferreira	400 m freestyle	4:13.75	19	—N/a		Did not advance	
Joanna Melo	200 m individual medley	2:16.21	12 Q	2:15.43	11	Did not advance	
Joanna Melo	400 m individual medley	4:42.01	6 Q	—N/a		4:40.00 NR	5
Tatiana Barbosa; Renata Burgos; Flávia Cazziolato; Rebeca Gusmão	4 × 100 m freestyle relay	3:45.38	12	—N/a		Did not advance	
Paula Baracho; Mariana Brochado; Monique Ferreira; Joanna Melo	4 × 200 m freestyle relay	8:05.58	7 Q	—N/a		8:05.29	7

== Synchronized swimming ==
Brazil has qualified 2 quota places in synchronized swimming.

Athlete	Event	Technical routine		Free routine (preliminary)			Free routine (final)		
Athlete	Event	Points	Rank	Points	Total (technical + free)	Rank	Points	Total (technical + free)	Rank
Carolina Moraes; Isabela Moraes	Duet	45.167	12	45.584	90.751	12 Q	45.750	90.917	12

== Table tennis ==
Brazil has qualified two spots each in the men's and women's doubles.

Men

Athlete	Event	Round 1	Round 2	Round 3	Round 4	Quarterfinals	Semifinals	Final / BM	
Athlete	Event	Opposition Result	Opposition Result	Opposition Result	Opposition Result	Opposition Result	Opposition Result	Opposition Result	Rank
Hugo Hoyama	Men's singles	Krzeszewski (POL); L 0–4	Did not advance						
Thiago Monteiro	Men's singles	Akhlaghpasand (IRI); W 4–1	Li C (HKG); L 1–4	Did not advance					
Hugo Hanashiro; Hugo Hoyama	Men's doubles	—N/a	Hielscher / Roßkopf (GER); L 2–4	Did not advance					

Women

Athlete	Event	Round 1	Round 2	Round 3	Round 4	Quarterfinals	Semifinals	Final / BM	
Athlete	Event	Opposition Result	Opposition Result	Opposition Result	Opposition Result	Opposition Result	Opposition Result	Opposition Result	Rank
Lígia Silva	Women's singles	Offiong (NGR); L 1–4	Did not advance						
Mariany Nonaka; Lígia Silva	Women's doubles	Bye	Štrbíková / Vachovcová (CZE); L 2–4	Did not advance					

== Taekwondo ==
Men

Athlete	Event	Round of 16	Quarterfinals	Semifinals	Repechage 1	Repechage 2	Final / BM	
Athlete	Event	Opposition Result	Opposition Result	Opposition Result	Opposition Result	Opposition Result	Opposition Result	Rank
Marcel Ferreira	Men's −58 kg	Bayoumi (EGY); L 2–10	Did not advance					
Diogo Silva	Men's −68 kg	García (VEN); W 6–5	Saei (IRI); L 6–8	Did not advance	Molfetta (ITA); W WO	Sagastume (GUA); W 12–10	Song M-S (KOR); L 7–12	4

Women

Athlete	Event	Round of 16	Quarterfinals	Semifinals	Repechage 1	Repechage 2	Final / BM	
Athlete	Event	Opposition Result	Opposition Result	Opposition Result	Opposition Result	Opposition Result	Opposition Result	Rank
Natália Falavigna	Women's +67 kg	Morgan (AUS); W 7–2	Rase (BEL); W 8–4	Chen Z (CHN); L 5–8	Bye	Castrignano (ITA); W 6–3	Carmona (VEN); L 4–7	4

== Tennis ==
Men

Athlete	Event	Round of 64	Round of 32	Round of 16	Quarterfinals	Semifinals	Final / BM	
Athlete	Event	Opposition Score	Opposition Score	Opposition Score	Opposition Score	Opposition Score	Opposition Score	Rank
Gustavo Kuerten	Men's singles	Massú (CHI); L 3–6, 7–5, 4–6	Did not advance					
Flávio Saretta	Men's singles	Roddick (USA); L 3–6, 6–7^{(4–7)}	Did not advance					
André Sá; Flávio Saretta	Men's doubles	—N/a	Moyá / Nadal (ESP); W 7–6^{(8–6)}, 6–1	Black / Ullyett (ZIM); L 3–6, 4–6	Did not advance			

== Triathlon ==
Brazil brought five veterans to the second Olympic triathlon. Once again, two triathletes did not finish (Carla Moreno started both, but finished neither).

Men

Athlete	Event	Swim (1.5 km)	Trans 1	Bike (40 km)	Trans 2	Run (10 km)	Total Time	Rank
Leandro Macedo	Men's	18:25	0:16	1:05:30	0:22	33:44	1:57:39.36	31
Paulo Miyashiro	Men's	17:57	0:18	1:05:59	0:23	34:20	1:58:16.76	34
Juraci Moreira	Men's	18:27	0:17	1:09:37	0:24	34:31	2:02:35.99	41

Women

Athlete	Event	Swim (1.5 km)	Trans 1	Bike (40 km)	Trans 2	Run (10 km)	Total Time	Rank
Carla Moreno	Women's	19:48	0:20	Did not finish				
Mariana Ohata	Women's	20:33	0:20	1:16:09	0:23	40:10	2:16:52.97	37
Sandra Soldan	Women's	19:41	0:23	Did not finish				

== Volleyball ==
=== Beach ===
Men

Athlete	Event	Preliminary round	Standing	Round of 16	Quarterfinals	Semifinals	Final	
Athlete	Event	Opposition Score	Standing	Opposition Score	Opposition Score	Opposition Score	Opposition Score	Rank
Márcio Araújo; Benjamin Insfran	Men's tournament	Pool B Canet – Hamel (FRA); W 2 – 0 (21–13, 21–14); Álvarez – Rossell (CUB); W 2 – 0 (23–21, 22–20); Dieckmann – Scheuerpflug (GER); L 0 – 2 (20–22, 17–21)	2 Q	M Laciga – P Laciga (SUI); L 1 – 2 (19–21, 21–19, 12–15)	Did not advance			
Emanuel Rego; Ricardo Santos	Men's tournament	Pool A Horrem – Maaseide (NOR); W 2 – 1 (21–15, 19–21, 15–10); Schacht – Slack (AUS); W 2 – 0 (21–17, 21–17); Holdren – Metzger (USA); W 2 – 0 (21–17, 21–10)	1 Q	Høidalen – Kjemperud (NOR); W 2 – 1 (21–15, 19–21, 15–6)	M Laciga – P Laciga (SUI); W 2 – 0 (21–13, 21–16)	Heuscher – Kobel (SUI); W 2 – 1 (21–14, 19–21, 15–12)	Bosma – Herrera (ESP); W 2 – 0 (21–16, 21–15)	1st place, gold medalist(s)

Women

Athlete	Event	Preliminary round	Standing	Round of 16	Quarterfinals	Semifinals	Final	
Athlete	Event	Opposition Score	Standing	Opposition Score	Opposition Score	Opposition Score	Opposition Score	Rank
Shelda Bede; Adriana Behar	Women's tournament	Pool B Naidoo – Willand (RSA); W 2 – 0 (21–7, 21–10); Gattelli – Perrotta (ITA); W 2 – 0 (21–17, 21–17); Fernández – Larrea (CUB); W 2 – 0 (21–14, 21–19)	1 Q	P Yanchulova – T Yanchulova (BUL); W 2 – 1 (18–21, 21–16, 15–11)	Connelly – Pires (BRA); W 2 – 1 (15–21, 21–13, 15–13)	Cook – Sanderson (AUS); W 2 – 0 (21–17, 21–16)	May – Walsh (USA); L 0 – 2 (17–21, 11–21)	2nd place, silver medalist(s)
Ana Paula Connelly; Sandra Pires	Women's tournament	Pool C Håkedal – Tørlen (NOR); W 2 – 0 (21–18, 21–19); Arvaniti – Koutroumanidou (GRE); W 2 – 0 (21–13, 21–14); Lahme – Müsch (GER); L 1 – 2 (21–18, 15–21, 11–15)	2 Q	Karantasiou – Sfyri (GRE); W 2 – 0 (21–16, 21–19)	Bede – Behar (BRA); L 1 – 2 (21–15, 13–21, 13–15)	Did not advance		

=== Indoor ===
Summary

Team	Event	Group Stage						Quarterfinal	Semifinal	Final / BM	
Team	Event	Opposition Score	Opposition Score	Opposition Score	Opposition Score	Opposition Score	Rank	Opposition Score	Opposition Score	Opposition Score	Rank
Brazil men's	Men's tournament	Australia; W 3–1	Italy; W 3–2	Netherlands; W 3–1	Russia; W 3–0	United States; L 1–3	1 Q	Poland; W 3–0	United States; W 3–1	Italy; W 1–3	1st place, gold medalist(s)
Brazil women's	Women's tournament	Japan; W 3–0	Kenya; W 3–0	Italy; W 3–2	Greece; W 3–0	South Korea; W 3–0	1 Q	United States; W 3–2	Russia; L 2–3	Cuba; L 1–3	4

==== Men's tournament ====
Roster

The following is the Brazilian roster in the men's volleyball tournament of the 2004 Summer Olympics.

Head coach: Bernardo Rezende

№	Name	Date of birth	Height	Weight	Spike	Block	2004 club
3	Giovane Gávio	7 September 1970	1.96 m (6 ft 5 in)	89 kg (196 lb)	340 cm (130 in)	322 cm (127 in)	(Brazil) Minas TC
4	André Heller	17 December 1975	1.99 m (6 ft 6 in)	93 kg (205 lb)	339 cm (133 in)	321 cm (126 in)	(Brazil) EC Unisul
6	Maurício Lima	27 January 1968	1.84 m (6 ft 0 in)	79 kg (174 lb)	321 cm (126 in)	304 cm (120 in)	(Italy) Gabeca Montichiari
7	Gilberto Godoy Filho	23 December 1976	1.92 m (6 ft 4 in)	85 kg (187 lb)	325 cm (128 in)	312 cm (123 in)	(Italy) Piemonte Cuneo
9	André Nascimento	3 April 1979	1.95 m (6 ft 5 in)	95 kg (209 lb)	340 cm (130 in)	320 cm (130 in)	(Brazil) Minas TC
10	Sérgio Santos (L)	15 October 1975	1.84 m (6 ft 0 in)	78 kg (172 lb)	325 cm (128 in)	310 cm (120 in)	(Brazil) EC Banespa
11	Anderson Rodrigues	21 May 1974	1.90 m (6 ft 3 in)	95 kg (209 lb)	330 cm (130 in)	321 cm (126 in)	(Japan) NEC Blue Rockets
12	Nalbert Bitencourt (c)	9 March 1974	1.95 m (6 ft 5 in)	82 kg (181 lb)	329 cm (130 in)	309 cm (122 in)	(Italy) Lube Macerata
13	Gustavo Endres	23 August 1975	2.03 m (6 ft 8 in)	98 kg (216 lb)	337 cm (133 in)	325 cm (128 in)	(Italy) Icom Latina
14	Rodrigo Santana	17 April 1979	2.05 m (6 ft 9 in)	85 kg (187 lb)	350 cm (140 in)	328 cm (129 in)	(Italy) 4Torri Ferrara
17	Ricardo Garcia	17 April 1979	1.91 m (6 ft 3 in)	89 kg (196 lb)	337 cm (133 in)	320 cm (130 in)	(Brazil) Minas TC
18	Dante Amaral	30 September 1980	2.01 m (6 ft 7 in)	86 kg (190 lb)	345 cm (136 in)	327 cm (129 in)	(Italy) Daytona Modena

Group play

Pos	Team	Pld	W	L	Pts	SW	SL	SR	SPW	SPL	SPR	Qualification
1	Brazil	5	4	1	9	13	7	1.857	483	431	1.121	Quarterfinals
2	Italy	5	3	2	8	13	7	1.857	465	434	1.071	Quarterfinals
3	United States	5	3	2	8	11	8	1.375	437	423	1.033	Quarterfinals
4	Russia	5	3	2	8	11	9	1.222	452	430	1.051	Quarterfinals
5	Netherlands	5	2	3	7	7	11	0.636	391	419	0.933	
6	Australia	5	0	5	5	2	15	0.133	331	422	0.784	

Source: FIVB

15 August 2004; 16:00	Brazil	3–1	Australia	Peace and Friendship Stadium; Attendance: 1,853; Referees: Georgios Karampetsos (GRE), Ryszard Dietrich (POL)
15 August 2004; 16:00	(23–25, 25–19, 25–12, 25–21) result			Peace and Friendship Stadium; Attendance: 1,853; Referees: Georgios Karampetsos (GRE), Ryszard Dietrich (POL)

17 August 2004; 21:45	Brazil	3–2	Italy	Peace and Friendship Stadium; Attendance: 6,500; Referees: Ning Wang (CHN), Kun-Tae Kim (KOR)
17 August 2004; 21:45	(25–21, 15–25, 25–16, 21–25, 33–31) result			Peace and Friendship Stadium; Attendance: 6,500; Referees: Ning Wang (CHN), Kun-Tae Kim (KOR)

19 August 2004; 11:00	Netherlands	1–3	Brazil	Peace and Friendship Stadium; Attendance: 4,150; Referees: Fernando Nava (MEX), Francisco Medina (CUB)
19 August 2004; 11:00	(22–25, 26–24, 21–25, 19–25) result			Peace and Friendship Stadium; Attendance: 4,150; Referees: Fernando Nava (MEX), Francisco Medina (CUB)

21 August 2004; 22:20	Brazil	3–0	Russia	Peace and Friendship Stadium; Attendance: 5,400; Referees: Hiroyuki Ito (JPN), Kun-Tae Kim (KOR)
21 August 2004; 22:20	(25–19, 25–13, 25–23) result			Peace and Friendship Stadium; Attendance: 5,400; Referees: Hiroyuki Ito (JPN), Kun-Tae Kim (KOR)

23 August 2004; 22:20	United States	3–1	Brazil	Peace and Friendship Stadium; Attendance: 3,150; Referees: Bela Hobor (HUN), Dejan Jovanovic (SCG)
23 August 2004; 22:20	(25–22, 25–23, 18–25, 25–22) result			Peace and Friendship Stadium; Attendance: 3,150; Referees: Bela Hobor (HUN), Dejan Jovanovic (SCG)

Quarterfinal

25 August 2004; 22:25	Poland	0–3	Brazil	Peace and Friendship Stadium; Attendance: 4,150; Referees: Ning Wang (CHN), Fernando Nava (MEX)
25 August 2004; 22:25	(22–25, 25–27, 18–25) result			Peace and Friendship Stadium; Attendance: 4,150; Referees: Ning Wang (CHN), Fernando Nava (MEX)

Semifinal

27 August 2004; 21:30	United States	0–3	Brazil	Peace and Friendship Stadium; Attendance: 9,380; Referees: Umit Sokullu (TUR), Ryszard Dietrich (POL)
27 August 2004; 21:30	(16–25, 17–25, 23–25) result			Peace and Friendship Stadium; Attendance: 9,380; Referees: Umit Sokullu (TUR), Ryszard Dietrich (POL)

Gold Medal Final

29 August 2004; 14:30	Italy	1–3	Brazil	Peace and Friendship Stadium; Attendance: 9,350; Referees: Hiroyuki Ito (JPN), Ning Wang (CHN)
29 August 2004; 14:30	(15–25, 26–24, 20–25, 22–25) result			Peace and Friendship Stadium; Attendance: 9,350; Referees: Hiroyuki Ito (JPN), Ning Wang (CHN)

Won Gold Medal

==== Women's tournament ====
Roster

The following is the Brazilian roster in the women's volleyball tournament of the 2004 Summer Olympics.

Head coach: José Roberto Guimarães

No.	Name	Date of birth	Height	Weight	Spike	Block	2004 club
1	Walewska Oliveira	10 January 1979	1.90 m (6 ft 3 in)	73 kg (161 lb)	310 cm (120 in)	290 cm (110 in)	(Brazil) São Caetano EC
2	Elisângela Oliveira	30 October 1978	1.84 m (6 ft 0 in)	81 kg (179 lb)	302 cm (119 in)	282 cm (111 in)	(Brazil) Paraná VC
3	Erika Coimbra	23 March 1980	1.80 m (5 ft 11 in)	64 kg (141 lb)	301 cm (119 in)	280 cm (110 in)	(Brazil) Finasa Osasco
5	Marianne Steinbrecher	23 August 1983	1.89 m (6 ft 2 in)	70 kg (150 lb)	310 cm (120 in)	290 cm (110 in)	(Brazil) Finasa Osasco
7	Hélia Souza	10 March 1970	1.75 m (5 ft 9 in)	63 kg (139 lb)	283 cm (111 in)	264 cm (104 in)	(Brazil) Paraná VC
8	Valeska Menezes	23 April 1976	1.80 m (5 ft 11 in)	62 kg (137 lb)	302 cm (119 in)	290 cm (110 in)	(Brazil) Finasa Osasco
9	Wélissa Gonzaga	9 September 1982	1.80 m (5 ft 11 in)	76 kg (168 lb)	300 cm (120 in)	287 cm (113 in)	(Brazil) Paraná VC
10	Virna Dias	31 August 1971	1.86 m (6 ft 1 in)	70 kg (150 lb)	306 cm (120 in)	294 cm (116 in)	(Brazil) Minas TC
11	Ana Chagas	18 October 1971	1.79 m (5 ft 10 in)	59 kg (130 lb)	296 cm (117 in)	286 cm (113 in)	(Brazil) Finasa Osasco
14	Fernanda Venturini (c)	24 October 1970	1.80 m (5 ft 11 in)	69 kg (152 lb)	292 cm (115 in)	280 cm (110 in)	(Brazil) Finasa Osasco
15	Arlene Xavier (L)	20 December 1969	1.78 m (5 ft 10 in)	74 kg (163 lb)	299 cm (118 in)	290 cm (110 in)	(Brazil) Minas TC
16	Fabiana Claudino	24 January 1985	1.94 m (6 ft 4 in)	76 kg (168 lb)	314 cm (124 in)	293 cm (115 in)	(Brazil) Minas TC

Group play

Pos	Team	Pld	W	L	Pts	SW	SL	SR	SPW	SPL	SPR	Qualification
1	Brazil	5	5	0	10	15	2	7.500	410	326	1.258	Quarterfinals
2	Italy	5	4	1	9	14	3	4.667	392	305	1.285	Quarterfinals
3	South Korea	5	3	2	8	9	7	1.286	355	352	1.009	Quarterfinals
4	Japan	5	2	3	7	6	10	0.600	346	343	1.009	Quarterfinals
5	Greece	5	1	4	6	5	12	0.417	349	383	0.911	
6	Kenya	5	0	5	5	0	15	0.000	236	379	0.623	

Source: FIVB

14 August 2004; 14:00	Japan	0–3	Brazil	Peace and Friendship Stadium; Referees: Frank Leuthaeusser (GER), Patrick Richard (FRA)
14 August 2004; 14:00	(21–25, 22–25, 21–25) result			Peace and Friendship Stadium; Referees: Frank Leuthaeusser (GER), Patrick Richard (FRA)

16 August 2004; 09:00	Kenya	0–3	Brazil	Peace and Friendship Stadium; Referees: Karin Zahorcova (CZE), Umit Sokullu (TUR)
16 August 2004; 09:00	(16–25, 27–29, 12–25) result			Peace and Friendship Stadium; Referees: Karin Zahorcova (CZE), Umit Sokullu (TUR)

18 August 2004; 21:30	Brazil	3–2	Italy	Peace and Friendship Stadium; Referees: Patricia Salvatore (USA), Kun Tae Kim (KOR)
18 August 2004; 21:30	(19–25, 25–13, 22–25, 25–16, 15–13) result			Peace and Friendship Stadium; Referees: Patricia Salvatore (USA), Kun Tae Kim (KOR)

20 August 2004; 16:00	Greece	0–3	Brazil	Peace and Friendship Stadium; Referees: Abdullah Al Khelaifi (KSA), Fernando Nava (MEX)
20 August 2004; 16:00	(22–25, 22–25, 11–25) result			Peace and Friendship Stadium; Referees: Abdullah Al Khelaifi (KSA), Fernando Nava (MEX)

22 August 2004; 19:30	Brazil	3–0	South Korea	Peace and Friendship Stadium; Referees: de Jan Jovonovic (SCG), Karin Zahorcova (CZE)
22 August 2004; 19:30	(25–19, 25–18, 25–23) result			Peace and Friendship Stadium; Referees: de Jan Jovonovic (SCG), Karin Zahorcova (CZE)

Quarterfinal

24 August 2004; 21:55	Brazil	3–2	United States	Peace and Friendship Stadium; Referees: Patrick Richard (FRA), Fotios Lekkas (GRE)
24 August 2004; 21:55	(25–22, 25–20, 22–25, 25–27, 15–6) result			Peace and Friendship Stadium; Referees: Patrick Richard (FRA), Fotios Lekkas (GRE)

Semifinal

26 August 2004; 19:30	Brazil	2–3	Russia	Peace and Friendship Stadium; Referees: Kun Tae Kim (KOR), Hiroyuki Ito (JPN)
26 August 2004; 19:30	(25–18, 25–21, 22–25, 26–28, 14–16) result			Peace and Friendship Stadium; Referees: Kun Tae Kim (KOR), Hiroyuki Ito (JPN)

Bronze Medal Final

26 August 2004; 19:30	Brazil	1–3	Cuba	Peace and Friendship Stadium; Referees: Jarmo Salonen (FIN), Ryszard Dietrich (POL)
26 August 2004; 19:30	(22–25, 22–25, 25–14, 17–25) result			Peace and Friendship Stadium; Referees: Jarmo Salonen (FIN), Ryszard Dietrich (POL)

== Wrestling ==
Key:

- VT – Victory by Fall.
- PP – Decision by Points – the loser with technical points.
- PO – Decision by Points – the loser without technical points.

Men's freestyle

Athlete	Event	Elimination Pool			Quarterfinal	Semifinal	Final / BM	
Athlete	Event	Opposition Result	Opposition Result	Rank	Opposition Result	Opposition Result	Opposition Result	Rank
Antoine Jaoude	−96 kg	Kurtanidze (GEO); L 0–5 ^{VT}	Heidari (IRI); L 0–4 ^{ST}	3	Did not advance			20

== See also ==
- Brazil at the 2003 Pan American Games
- Brazil at the 2004 Summer Paralympics
