= Equestrian at the 2004 Summer Olympics – Team eventing =

Team eventing at the Games of the XXVIII Olympiad
- Venue: Markopoulo Olympic Equestrian Centre
- Date: 15–18 August 2004
- Competitors: 65 from 14 nations

Medalists
1st place, gold medalist(s)		Nicolas Touzaint, Jean Teulère, Didier Courrèges, Cédric Lyard, Arnaud Boiteau	France
2nd place, silver medalist(s)		Pippa Funnell, Leslie Law, Mary King, Jeanette Brakewell, William Fox-Pitt	Great Britain
3rd place, bronze medalist(s)		Kimberly Severson, Amy Tryon, Darren Chiacchia, John Williams, Julie Richards	United States

The team eventing event, part of the equestrian program at the 2004 Summer Olympics, was held from the 15–18 August 2004. For the first time since 1992, the team and individual contests ran concurrently. The team event used the results of the first three phases of the individual eventing program to award rankings. A fourth phase (a second jumping round) was included in the individual competition for the first time. The competition was held at the Olympic Equestrian Centre on the outskirts of Markopoulo, in the Attica region of Greece. Like all other equestrian events, the eventing competition was mixed gender, with both male and female athletes competing in the same division. 14 teams, each consisting of between three and five horse and rider pairs, entered the contest.

== Results ==
=== By individual ===
The team event used the points from the end of the third phase of competition. 65 of the 75 pairs that competed in the individual event were members of a team. Team members are shown below, with scores used for the team highlighted. Only the top three pairs on a national team had their scores used for the team score. Pairs that were eliminated or withdrew received 1000 penalty points, which would have guaranteed a last-place finish for any team that had to use that pair's score.

Rank	Rider	Horse	Nationality	Dressage	Cross Country	Jumping	Total
1st place, gold medalist(s)	Nicolas Touzaint	Galan de Sauvagere	France	29.4	0	4	33.4
2nd place, silver medalist(s)	Kimberly Severson	Winsome Adante	United States	36.2	0	5	41.2
3rd place, bronze medalist(s)	Pippa Funnell	Primmore's Pride	Great Britain	31.4	11.2	0	42.6
4	Leslie Law	Shear l'Eau	Great Britain	43.2	1.2	0	44.4
5	Hinrich Romeike	Marius	Germany	44.4	0.8	0	45.2
6	Jean Teulere	Espoir de la Mare	France	38.4	0	8	46.4
7	Heelan Tompkins	Glengarrick	New Zealand	44.0	0	4	48.0
8	Bettina Hoy	Ringwood Cockatoo	Germany	32.0	3.6	14	49.6
9	Rebel Morrow	Oaklea Groover	Australia	40.6	1.6	8	50.2
10	Phillip Dutton	Nova Top	Australia	46.8	0	4	50.8
11	Amy Tryon	Poggio II	United States	50.6	1.2	0	51.8
12	Darren Chiacchia	Windfall II	United States	44.6	0	8	52.6
13	Andreas Dibowski	Little Lemon	Germany	45.4	3.6	4	53.0
14	Frank Ostholt	Air Jordan	Germany	41.4	1.6	11	54.0
15	Constantin van Rijckevorsel	Withcote Nellie	Belgium	48.0	6.4	0	54.4
16	Mary King	King Solomon III	Great Britain	48.0	0	8	56.0
17	Karin Donckers	Gormley	Belgium	56.4	0	0	56.4
18	Jeanette Brakewell	Over To You	Great Britain	49.8	4	4	57.8
19	Matthew Grayling	Revo	New Zealand	47.2	0	12	59.2
20	Didier Courrèges	Debat d'Estruval	France	45.6	0	15	60.6
21	John Williams	Carrick	United States	47.6	1.2	12	60.8
22	Magnus Gallerdal	Keymaster	Sweden	61.0	2.8	0	63.8
23	Julie Richards	Jacob Two Two	United States	65.4	1.6	0	67.0
23	Mark Kyle	Drunken Disorderly	Ireland	63.0	0	4	67.0
26	Blyth Tait	Ready Teddy	New Zealand	63.8	1.2	4	69.0
27	Harald Ambros	Miss Ferrari	Austria	54.0	7.2	8	69.2
28	Cedric Lyard	Fine Mervielle	France	54.4	3.2	13	70.6
29	Daniel Jocelyn	Silence	New Zealand	66.8	0	4	70.8
30	Niall Griffin	Lorgaine	Ireland	58.4	4.8	10	73.2
31	Giovanni Menchi	Hunefer	Italy	72.4	4	0	76.4
32	Susan Shortt	Just Beauty Queen	Ireland	58.8	6	12	76.8
33	Sara Algotsson	Robin des Bois	Sweden	56.6	11.2	12	79.8
35	Stefano Brecciaroli	Cappa Hill	Italy	66.8	13.2	0	80.0
37	Hendrik Degros	Mr. Noppus	Belgium	63.8	18.4	0	82.2
38	Stuart Tinney	Jeepster	Australia	48.8	0	36	84.8
39	Kamil Rajnert	Marnego	Poland	50.8	24.4	12	87.2
40	Michael Winter	Balista	Canada	63.2	16.8	8	88.0
41	Bruce Mandeville	Larissa	Canada	66.4	10.8	12	89.2
42	Linda Algotsson	Stand By Me	Sweden	43.6	38.8	8	90.4
43	Dolf Desmedt	Bold Action	Belgium	57.0	31.2	4	92.2
44	Raul Senna	Super Rocky	Brazil	76.0	14.4	5	95.4
45	Harald Siegl	Gigant 2	Austria	60.6	23.2	12	95.8
47	Rafael Gouveia Jr.	Mozart	Brazil	65.8	4.8	30	100.6
48	Fabio Magni	Vent d'Arade	Italy	64.4	24.4	12	100.8
49	Sasha Harrison	All Love du Fenaud	Ireland	52.8	41.6	8	102.4
50	Sergio Marins	Rally LF	Brazil	70.0	16.0	19	105.0
51	Andrzej Pasek	Dekalog	Poland	60.4	26.4	28	114.8
54	Andre Paro	Land Heir	Brazil	70.0	16.8	37	123.8
55	Garry Roque	Waikura	Canada	63.4	45.6	15	124.0
56	Susanna Bordone	Ava	Italy	62.8	47.2	15	125.0
57	Andrew Hoy	Mr Pracatan	Australia	43.6	75.8	16	135.4
58	Harald Riedl	Foxy XX	Austria	61.6	52.8	27	141.4
59	Remo Tellini	Especial Reserve	Brazil	79.6	17.6	51	148.2
61	Andrew Nicholson	Fenicio	New Zealand	63.4	72.2	14	149.6
62	Edmond Gibney	Kings Highway	Ireland	68.0	80.6	4	152.6
64	Hawley Bennett	Livingstone	Canada	61.2	94.8	12	168.0
66	Pawel Spisak	Weriusz	Poland	67.0	99.4	8	174.4
67	Ian Roberts	Mata-riki	Canada	70.6	137.0	22	229.6
68	Margit Appelt	Ice on Fire	Austria	74.6	162.2	35	271.8
WD	William Fox-Pitt	Tamarillo	Great Britain	-	-	-	1000
DNS	Ingrid Klimke	Sleep Late	Germany	-	-	-	1000
WD	Olivia Bunn	Top of the Line	Australia	-	-	-	1000
X	Arnaud Boiteau	Expo du Moulin	France	-	-	-	1000
X	Joris Vanspringel	Over and Over	Belgium	-	-	-	1000
X	Andreas Zehrer	Raemmi Daemmi	Austria	-	-	-	1000

=== By team ===
Each team consisted of five pairs of horse and rider. The penalty points of the lowest three pairs were added together to reach the team's penalty points.

1. France - 140.4
  - Nicolas Touzaint riding Galan de Sauvagere, 33.4
  - Jean Teulere riding Espoir de la Mare, 46.4
  - Didier Courrèges riding Debat D'Estruval, 60.6
  - Cedric Lyard riding Fine Merveille, ~~70.6~~
  - Arnaud Boiteau riding Expo du Moulin, ~~1000.0~~
2. Great Britain - 143.0
  - Pippa Funnell riding Primmore's Pride, 42.6
  - Leslie Law riding Shear L'Eau, 44.4
  - Mary King riding King Solomon III, 56.0
  - Jeanette Brakewell riding Over To You, ~~57.8~~
  - William Fox-Pitt riding Tamarillo, ~~1000.0~~
3. United States - 145.6
  - Kimberly Severson riding Winsome Adante, 41.2
  - Amy Tryon riding Poggio II, 51.8
  - Darren Chiacchia riding Windfall 2, 52.6
  - John Williams riding Carrick, ~~60.8~~
  - Julie Richards riding Jacob Two Two, ~~67.0~~
4. Germany - 147.8
  - Hinrich Romeike riding Marius, 45.2
  - Bettina Hoy riding Ringwood Cockatoo, 49.6
  - Andreas Dibowski riding Little Lemon, 53.0
  - Frank Ostholt riding Air Jordan, ~~54.0~~
  - Ingrid Klimke riding Sleep Late, ~~1000.0~~
5. New Zealand - 176.2
  - Heelan Tompkins riding Glengarrick, 48.0
  - Matthew Grayling riding Revo, 59.2
  - Blyth Tait riding Ready Teddy, 69.0
  - Daniel Jocelyn riding Silence, ~~70.8~~
  - Andrew Nicholson riding Fenicio, ~~149.6~~
6. Australia - 185.8
  - Rebel Morrow riding Oaklea Groover, 50.2
  - Phillip Dutton riding Nova Top, 50.8
  - Stuart Tinny riding Jeepster, 84.8
  - Andrew Hoy riding Mr Pracatan, ~~135.4~~
  - Olivia Bunn riding Top of the Line, ~~1000.0~~
7. Belgium - 193.0
  - Constantin van Rijckevorsel riding Withcote Nellie, 54.4
  - Karin Donckers riding Gormley, 56.4
  - Hendrik Degros riding Mr. Noppus, 82.2
  - Dolf Desmedt riding Bold Action, ~~92.2~~
  - Joris Vanspringel riding Over and Over, ~~1000.0~~
8. Ireland - 217.0
  - Mark Kyle riding Drunken Disorderly, 67.0
  - Niall Griffin riding Lorgaine, 73.2
  - Susan Shortt riding Just Beauty Queen, 76.8
  - Sasha Harrison riding All Love du Fenaud, ~~102.4~~
  - Edmond Gibney riding Kings Highway, ~~152.6~~
9. Sweden - 234.0
  - Magnus Gallerdal riding Keymaster, 63.8
  - Sara Algotsson riding Robin des Bois, 79.8
  - Linda Algotsson riding Stand By Me, 90.4
10. Italy - 257.2
  - Giovanni Menchi riding Hunefer, 76.4
  - Stefano Brecciaroli riding Cappa Hill, 80.0
  - Fabio Magni riding Vent D'Arade, 100.8
  - Susanna Bordone riding Ava, ~~125.0~~
11. Brazil - 301.0
  - Raul Senna riding Super Rocky, 95.4
  - Rafael Gouveia, Jr. riding Mozart, 100.6
  - Sergio Marins riding Rally LF, 105.0
  - Andre Paro riding Land Heir, ~~123.8~~
  - Remo Tellini riding Especial Reserve, ~~148.2~~
12. Canada - 301.2
  - Michael Winter riding Balista, 88.0
  - Bruce Mandeville riding Larissa, 89.2
  - Garry Roque riding Waikura, 124.0
  - Hawley Bennett riding Livingstone, ~~168.0~~
  - Ian Roberts riding Mata-riki, ~~229.6~~
13. Austria - 306.4
  - Harald Ambros riding Miss Ferrari, 69.2
  - Harald Siegl riding Gigant 2, 95.8
  - Harald Riedl riding Foxy XX, 141.4
  - Margit Appelt riding Ice On Fire, ~~271.8~~
  - Andreas Zehrer riding Raemmi Daemmi, ~~1000.0~~
14. Poland - 376.4
  - Kamil Rajnert riding Marengo, 87.2
  - Andrzej Pasek riding Dekalog, 114.8
  - Pawel Spisak riding Weriusz, 174.4
