= Julie Richards =

American equestrian

Personal information
- Full name: Julie Lynne Black-Burns Richard
- Born: September 26, 1970 (age 55) Newnan, Georgia, U.S.
Medal record
Equestrian
Representing the United States
Olympic Games
Bronze medal – third place	2004 Athens	Team eventing

Julie Lynne Black-Burns Richards (born September 26, 1970) is an American equestrian. Born in Newnan, Georgia, she competed in eventing in the 2000 Olympics and won a bronze medal in team eventing at the 2004 Summer Olympics in Athens, together with Kimberly Severson, John Williams, Darren Chiacchia and Amy Tryon.
