= Windfall II =

Trakehner stallion, eventing horse

- Breed: Trakehner
- Discipline: Eventing
- Sire: Habicht
- Dam: Wundermaedel xx
- Maternal grandsire: Madruzzo
- Sex: Stallion
- Foaled: 1992
- Country: United States
- Colour: 16.3 hh Black
- Breeder: Heinz Lembke
- Owner: Timothy Holekamp
- Trainer: Ingrid Klimke, Darren Chiacchia

Olympic medal record

Equestrian
Bronze medal – third place	2004 Athens	Team eventing

Windfall II is a retired Trakehner stallion that competed internationally in the equestrian sport of eventing.

== Breeding ==
=== Sire's Side ===
Windfall is registered with the Trakehner Verband, despite only having one grandparent with East Prussian Trakehner bloodlines, his sire's dam, Hallo. Hallo's dam, Handschelle, was part of the elite mare herd at the stud in Trakehnen and tended to produce heavier-boned offspring. Hallo was therefore bred to a lighter stallion, the Anglo-Arabian Burnus AA. Burnus was ridden by the acclaimed Reiner Klimke on the German national team in eventing, before retiring to stand at stud. Burnus and Hallo produced the sire of Windfall, Habicht.

Habicht won his 100-day testing, and went on to be a successful event horse, winning the CCI*** at Achselschwang and finishing as the best German horse at the Burghley CCI****. His breeding career was equally impressive, producing top horses in not only eventing, but also dressage and show jumping. The stallion is also still used as the standard for a jumper, due to his excellent bascule, the great folding of his front legs, and his overall willingness to jump.

=== Dam's side ===
Windfall's dam, Wundermaedel xx, was an approved "Elite Mare" in the Trakehner Verband studbook, being one of only three Thoroughbred mares to earn the "elite" status, out of a total of 110. Her lineage includes top European racing bloodlines: her sire Madruzzo xx won St. Legere and finished second in the German Derby, and was a top-ranked steeplechase sire in the 1970s. Wundermaedel raced nine times, winning once and placing five times before she was inspected by the Trakehner Verband (who gave her a "10" for type). She then began her successful eventing career, winning up to the advanced level. As a broodmare, she produced the mare Windspiel, who was named “Trakehner of the Year 1997” and finished seventh at the Luhmuehlen CCI***, and five colts, all of whom were selected for the Neumuenster stallion inspections.

== Life in Germany ==
Windfall was bred by Heinz Lembke, the owner of his dam. Foaled in April 1992, he was purchased after weaning by Gestuet Hoerstein, one of the most well-known breeding stations for Trakehner event horses in the world. As a two-year-old, Windfall was one of 75 colts, out of 1000, to be selected for the Koerung at Neumunster. There he was one of only five colts to be given "premium" status, and was the only one of the five to be half-thoroughbred. Windfall was then sold at auction to Wolfgang and Christa Diehm.

He had a short breeding career early in his life, but this was ended when he began his eventing career, to help reduce the chance of distraction. As a four-year-old, Windfall was sent to German Olympian Ingrid Klimke, the daughter of Reiner Klimke. She rode Windfall for four years, earning 40 wins or placings. These included the German Young Horse Championships, during which Windfall was used for dressage, cross-country, and the showjumping phase; and wins at every 1999 CIC** or CIC*** in Germany. Additionally, he was short-listed for the German Eventing Team at the 2000 Olympics, but did not compete because Klimke was selected to ride a different horse.

== Life in the United States ==
Windfall was sold to Tim Holekamp, owner of New Spring Farm, in 2000, and imported to the US in January 2001. He was purchased not only to continue his successful career as an event horse, but also for breeding purposes, bringing his quality Trakehner blood to the United States.

Windfall and his new rider, Darren Chiacchia, had trust issues early in their partnership. This usually manifested itself on the cross-country course, where trust is essential. Difficulties during their first Advanced-level events resulted in Windfall being dropped to the Preliminary level. Once Windfall gained trust in his rider, however, his performance improved.

Windfall won several Advanced events in the United States. In August 2006, Windfall became only the fourth horse in US Eventing history to earn 1,000 points, joining Giltedge, Winsome Adante, and Hannigan. He also won the 2003 Pan American Games, won the 2004 Modified Rolex Kentucky Three Day event, and was part of the bronze-medal 2004 US Eventing Team.

== Breeding career ==
Windfall is a registered Trakehner and was approved by the Irish Horse Board, Westphalian Verband, Swedish Warmblood registry, and Hanoverian registry (named an "elite Hanoverian Stallion"). Windfall can be found in the American Trakehner Association horse search as E.H. Windfall *Pg*E*. His registration number is OSB-E-S353.

Windfall was bred in Germany prior to his event career. During his first year in the United States, Windfall sired 9 foals, and produced 17 foals in 2002, all by artificial insemination.

As of 2025, two of Windfall's most successful offspring include Tsetserleg and Vandiver. Tsetserleg won individual and team gold medals representing the USA in the Pan American games in Lima, Peru, and then became a Team USA horse in the Tokyo Olympics alongside another Windfall son, Vandiver, who also excelled in showjumping. Tsetserleg also competed in the 2022 World Equestrian Games at Pratoni, Italy where he won a team silver.

== Competitive career in the United States ==
Windfall was competitive in the dressage phase of eventing, usually winning or placing in the top three each time. After retiring from an illustrious eventing career, Windfall went on to compete up the levels of dressage through Grand Prix. Windfall was competitive in showjumping, competing in Level Five (jumping 3'9-4') classes.

=== Successful placings ===
2001

- 4th North American Beaulieu Classic (CIC***)
- 1st Groton House H.T. (prelim)
- 1st Over the Walls Horse Trials (advanced)

2002

- 1st Rocking Horse H. T. (advanced)
- 9th Poplar Place Horse Trials (advanced)
- 2nd North American Beaulieu Classic (CIC***)
- 1st Virginia Three-Day & Horse Trials (prelim)
- 1st Stuart Horse Trials (CIC**)
- 3rd Over the Walls H.T. (Nat’l Adv. H.T. Championship)
- 2nd Morven Park Three-Day & Horse Trials (advanced)
- 5th Fair Hill CCI***
- Ranked 6th in USEA

2003

- 1st Rocking Horse H.T. (advanced)
- 1st Pine Top Horse Trials (advanced)
- 2nd Red Hills Horse Trials CIC***-W, best US pair
- 2nd Poplar Place Farm H.T. (advanced)
- 9th North American Beaulieu Classic CIC***
- 2nd Foxhall Cup CCI***
- 5th Wayne H.T. (advanced)
- 2nd Over the Walls H.T. (advanced HT Ch)
- 1st Stuart H.T. (CIC**)
- 10th Five Points H.T. (advanced)
- 1st (individual Gold) Fair Hill CCI*** (Pan Am Ch)

2004

- 4th Rocking Horse Winter II H.T.
- 1st Red Hills H.T. 1st place
- 1st Poplar Place Farm March H.T.
- 1st Kentucky Three-day Event (Modified Division)
- 12th Athens Olympic Games, Team Bronze

2005

- 1st Rocking Horse Winter II HT (advanced)
- 2nd Red Hills CIC***-W
- 4th Chatsworth CIC***
- Rolex CCI**** 2nd after dressage (Spun after steeplechase)

2006

- 2nd Rocking Horse Winter II HT (advanced)
- 13th Red Hills CIC*** W (broken rein xc)
- 6th Poplar Place HT (advanced)
- 1st The Fork CIC*** W
- Rolex CCI **** 1st after dressage (retired xc)
- 1st Virginia Horse Trials (intermediate)
- 2nd Groton House II HT (adv/int)
- 1st Stuart Horse Trials CIC**
- 1st Millbrook HT (advanced)
- 1st Richland Park HT (advanced)

2007

- 1st Rocking Horse Winter II HT (advanced)
- 3rd Red Hills CIC***-W
- TE Millbrook HT (preliminary)
- 1st Richland Park HT (intermediate)

== Retirement ==
After retiring from eventing competitions, Windfall continued his breeding career and went on to sire 94 direct offspring. He lives at the Holekamp's farm in MO. where he went on to a career in dressage and in 2013 at the age of 21, competed in Grand Prix dressage under his long time owner, Cheryl Holekamp. In 2022, at the age of 30 (and still a stallion), Cheryl & Windfall completed their USDF century ride together.
