= Amy Tryon =

American equestrian eventer

Personal information
- Born: February 24, 1970 Redmond, Washington
- Died: April 12, 2012 (aged 42) Duvall, Washington
Medal record
Equestrian
Representing United States
Olympic Games
Bronze medal – third place	2004 Athens	Team Eventing
World Equestrian Games
Gold medal – first place	2002 Jerez	Team Eventing
Bronze medal – third place	2006 Aachen	Individual Eventing

Amy Tryon (February 24, 1970 – April 12, 2012) was an American equestrian known for her achievements in eventing.

Born in Redmond, Washington, Tryon earned a bronze medal in team eventing at the 2004 Summer Olympics in Athens. She competed alongside Kimberly Severson, John Williams, Darren Chiacchia, and Julie Richards. In addition to her team success, she also competed in individual eventing, finishing in sixth place.

Amy and her older sister got their first pony when Amy was just one. She started competing at the age of five and rode at her first event when she was just eight.

She found her top horse, the former racehorse Poggio II, in a classified advertisement in the Seattle Times newspaper. Together Amy and Poggio represented the USA at two Olympic Games, Athens 2004 and the Beijing 2008 Olympic Games in Hong Kong, and two FEI World Equestrian Games™, winning team gold in Jerez de la Frontera (ESP) in 2002 and individual bronze in Aachen (GER) in 2006. Amy was a firefighter until the summer of 2006, when she retired to dedicate herself full time to riding, basing herself out of Mapleleaf Eventing at Upson Downs in Duvall, Washington. In 2006, she won an individual bronze medal at the World Championship in Aachen. Tryon and her horse, Poggio II, later represented the U.S. at the 2008 Summer Olympics in Hong Kong.

Amy Tryon had a competitive record that few can match. With her beloved Poggio II, Amy represented the United States Eventing Team no less than five times, contributing to team gold medals at the 1999 Pan American Games and the 2002 World Equestrian Games and the team bronze medal at the 2004 Olympic Games. She and Poggio also took the individual bronze in Aachen at the 2006 World Equestrian Games and were again called up for the team at the Beijing Olympic Games in 2008.

Under Tryon’s care, Poggio was named the Best Conditioned Horse at the Rolex Kentucky Three-Day Event in 2002. In 2006, Tryon was named The Chronicle of the Horse Eventing Horseman of the Year and Poggio was named Eventing Horse of the Year. Tryon also volunteered on a number of USEA and USEF committees and was very active on the USEA Safety Committee. Her contributions to the growth of the sport in her own Area VII were immense.

== Rolex Kentucky incident and abuse allegations ==
At the Rolex Kentucky cross-country on April 28, 2007, Amy Tryon continued to ride for approximately 30 seconds after her horse, Le Samurai, had sustained what later proved to be a fatal injury. Few equestrian events have garnered the kind of emotion that was elicited after the Rolex Kentucky cross-country on April 28, when Amy Tryon jumped the last fence and completed approximately the final 30 seconds of the course after her mount, Le Samurai, had sustained what later proved to be a fatal injury.

On July 20, the Fédération Equestre Internationale’s Tribunal determined that Tryon was guilty of unintentional abuse, sentencing her to a two-month suspension and a combined fine and reimbursement of legal expenses of approximately $2,000. Tryon chose not to appeal, so the suspension began immediately. Following the ruling, Tryon was free to talk about the situation for the first time.

Tryon believed that the FEI Tribunal process was fair. “They tried very hard to take everything into consideration. It was done in a fair manner, and they listened to what I said and what Mark Phillips and Karen O’Connor said on my behalf,” she said. “I was willing to accept what they handed me. I felt I wasn’t in a position to judge either way.”

In terms of a reaction from the U.S. Equestrian Federation or U.S. Eventing Association, Tryon said that the USEF was very supportive of her in a statement to the FEI regarding her record as a competitor but remained neutral in declaring whether she was right or wrong.

Not one of Tryon’s owners withdrew their support, and neither did her sponsors.

“I apologize to the FEI, to the Broussard family [who owned Le Samurai], to my husband Greg and to my fellow competitors,” said Tryon through tears. “I have been, my entire life, in defense of animals, and I never would have caused intentional pain. I realize my actions were wrong, and I want to sincerely apologize to everyone.”

== Death ==
Tryon was found dead at her home in Duvall, Washington on April 12, 2012. According to the King County Medical Examiner's Office, she died of an accidental drug overdose. Toxicology reports revealed toxic levels of oxycodone, diphenhydramine, alprazolam, lorazepam, diazepam, and temazepam in her system at the time of her death. According to her husband, Greg, "she had her jaw dislocated on the Sunday before her death by a horse,” said her husband, Greg. “She’d had surgery to have both joints put back in on Tuesday. She took way too many of her muscle relaxants, plus the pain medication that she was on for the jaw, and apparently some other stuff as well. You couple all that together, and it’s a lethal combination. She was taking it as her management of the pain from the jaw. She wasn’t on that prior to that event. According to the medical examiner, it wasn’t the amount that was in her system, it was the different types."

He said Amy was feeling very positive before her death with two promising young horses in the barn and an enthusiastic barn staff who made the barn a fun place to work. “Some friends in the horse world from both sides of the Atlantic were going to go to Africa on a safari with horses. When she came home from California the week before she was non-stop chatting about wanting to go on this safari."

Captain Mark Phillips, US Eventing Team Chef d’Equipe, said: “Amy was one of my first developing riders on the West Coast and went on to be a regular member of the team for 10 years. We won the Worlds in 2002 and she was third individually in the Aachen World Equestrian Games. We will all miss her terribly. She was a central member of the team, and was part of some of our most successful years."
