= Cédric Lyard =

French equestrian (born 1972)

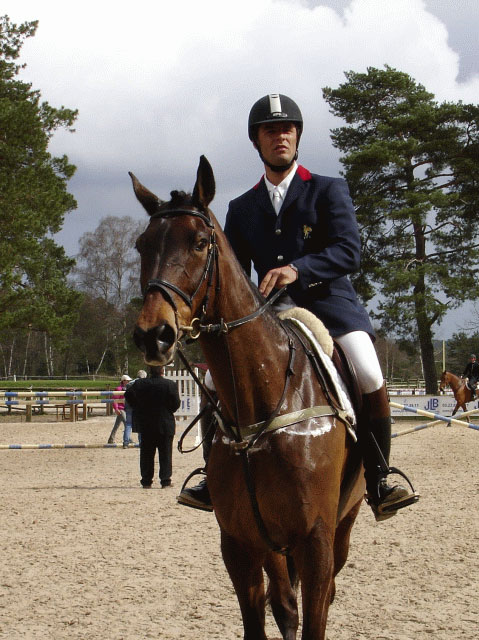

Medal record

Equestrian

Representing France

Olympic Games
Gold medal – first place	2004 Athens	Team eventing

World Equestrian Games
Silver medal – second place	2002 Jerez	Team Eventing

Cédric Lyard (born 22 January 1972 in Grenoble) is a French equestrian and Olympic champion. He won a team gold medal in eventing at the 2004 Summer Olympics in Athens.
