= Darren Chiacchia =

American equestrian

Personal information
- Born: September 18, 1964 (age 61) Buffalo, New York, U.S.
Medal record
Equestrian
Representing the United States
Olympic Games
Bronze medal – third place	2004 Athens	Team eventing

Darren Chiacchia (born September 18, 1964 in Buffalo, New York) is an American equestrian. He won a bronze medal in team eventing at the 2004 Summer Olympics in Athens, together with Kimberly Severson, John Williams, Amy Tryon and Julie Richards. He also competed in individual eventing, placing 12th.

Chiacchia gained national attention in 2008 when his mount, Baron Verdi fell on him at the Red Hills Horse Trials. Chiacchia was airlifted from the event, and remained in a coma for 42 days. The incident, along with the cases of two horses dying at the same event sparked debate about the safety of equestrian sports.

Chiacchia was arrested in 2010 on felony charges for allegedly exposing a former sex partner to the HIV virus. Chiacchia first tested positive for HIV in 2008. During their relationship from February to June 2009, Chiacchia's former partner claimed he did not disclose that he was HIV positive.

The charges were dismissed as intercourse in Florida law was defined as only being able to occur between a man and a woman. The case renewed discussion about laws that may discourage people for getting tested for the virus, which can lie dormant for many years.

The felony charge against Chiacchia was reinstated in 2013 after the Florida 5th District Court of Appeal reversed the lower court's decision. In 2014 he was wanted for arrest after missing a court appearance.

The felony HIV-related charge was again dropped against Chiacchia in February 2017. The prosecution in Marion County entered a nolle prosequi.

Chiacchia owns and operates Independence Farm, full-service breeding, training, and sales barn located in Western New York. He volunteers his expertise as the Chair of the USEA's Events Rating Task Force.

== Major Accomplishments ==
- 2004 U.S. Olympic team member
- 2003 Pan American Games individual gold medal champion (Windfall II)
- 2002 World Equestrian Games U.S. team member
- 2000 U.S. Olympic equestrian team traveling alternate
- 2007 Pan American Games U.S. Equestrian representative

== Horses ==
=== Windfall 2 ===
(1992, Trakehner Stallion; owned by Tim Holekamp) Chiacchia and Windfall 2 had their best season ever in 2003 when they won the Individual Gold medal in the Pan American Eventing title at Fair Hill.

=== Better I Do It ===
(14-year-old Swedish Warmblood gelding by Billion out of Concitia; Owned by Adrienne Iorio) Represented the U.S. at the 1995 Open European Championships in Italy with Fascination Street after a third place-finish in the CCI*** at Rolex Kentucky.
