= Municipal University of São Caetano do Sul =

University in Brazil

- Type: Public, Municipal (although it is a paid college)
- Established: August 1, 1968 (as Faculdade Municipal de Ciências Econômicas, Políticas e Sociais)
- Rector: Marcos Sidnei Bassi
- Location: São Caetano do Sul, São Paulo, Brazil
- Website: uscs.edu.br (in Portuguese)

Municipal University of São Caetano do Sul (Portuguese: Universidade Municipal de São Caetano do Sul, USCS) is a university in São Caetano do Sul, Brazil.

== History ==
The institution was first known as Faculdade Municipal de Ciências Econômicas, Políticas e Sociais (Municipal College of Economics, Politics, and Social Sciences) and then Instituto Municipal de Ensino Superior de São Caetano do Sul (Municipal Higher Education Institute of São Caetano do Sul), and on August 1, 1968, Universidade Municipal de São Caetano do Sul (City University of São Caetano do Sul).

In 1970, it was again renamed Instituto Municipal de Ensino Superior de São Caetano do Sul (IMES), and in 2000 the institution officially became a university. In 2004, it launched the Law, Health, Education, and Graduate Studies programs.

In 2007, it was once again renamed Universidade Municipal de São Caetano do Sul (USCS), under municipal law n.o 4581, since it is a university center.
