= Dayane da Rocha =

Brazilian footballer (born 1985)

Personal information
- Full name: Dayane de Fátima da Rocha
- Date of birth: 13 May 1985 (age 41)
- Place of birth: Curitiba, Brazil
- Height: 1.66 m (5 ft 5 in)
- Position: Striker

Senior career*
Years	Team	Apps	(Gls)
2001–2007	Novo Mundo		
2006	→ Olympique Lyon (loan)	7	(3)
2007–2008	Puebla		
2008–2009	Sporting Huelva	29	(10)
2009–2013	Bardolino Verona		(30)
2010	→ Kindermann (loan)		
2013–2014	Kindermann		

International career
- Brazil
- * Club domestic league appearances and goals

Dayane de Fátima da Rocha (born 13 May 1985), commonly known as Dayane Rocha or simply as Dayane, is a Brazilian football and futsal striker, who has played for professional clubs in Brazil, France, Spain and Italy. She previously played for Irex Puebla and Sporting Huelva in Spain's Superliga.

She received a late call-up to the Brazil national team panel during the 2004 Summer Olympics, as an injury replacement for Kelly who had broken her collarbone.

She transferred to Bardolino Verona in August 2009. In March 2011 Dayane obtained Italian citizenship, allowing her to be treated as a domestic player in Serie A with Bardolino Verona.

Dayane returned to Brazil in 2010 to finish her college scholarship. She intended to resume playing for Novo Mundo but was dismayed to find they had recently disbanded. Instead she played for Kindermann in the 2010 Copa do Brasil. She returned to Kindermann's ranks in 2013.

Throughout her outdoor football career she also enjoyed playing futsal, and decided to focus exclusively on the latter in 2013. She remained in Italy and played successfully for a series of Italian futsal clubs, including Isolotto, Olimpus Roma, Montesilvano, Cagliari, and Granzette (which changed its name to Rovigo Orange in 2022).
