= Paulo Machado (swimmer) =

Brazilian swimmer (born 1978)

Personal information
- Full name: Paulo Maurício Silva Machado
- Nationality: Brazil
- Born: 24 July 1978 (age 47) Piracicaba, São Paulo, Brazil
- Height: 1.93 m (6 ft 4 in)
- Weight: 92 kg (203 lb)

Sport
- Sport: Swimming
- Strokes: Backstroke
- Club: EC Pinheiros (BRA)
- College team: Tennessee Volunteers (USA)

Paulo Maurício Silva Machado (born July 24, 1978 in Piracicaba, São Paulo) is a Brazilian swimmer, who specialized in backstroke events. Macahdo is a former member of the Tennessee Volunteers and a graduate of liberal arts and sciences at the University of Tennessee in Knoxville, Tennessee.

Machado qualified for two swimming events at the 2004 Summer Olympics in Athens, by attaining a FINA A-standard entry time of 56.19 (100 m backstroke) from the national championships in Rio de Janeiro. In the 100-metre backstroke, Machado challenged seven other swimmers on the third heat, including Olympic veterans Derya Büyükuncu of Turkey, Eduardo Germán Otero of Argentina, and Gordan Kozulj of Croatia. He edged out Otero to take the seventh spot by 0.21 of a second with a time of 57.07 seconds. Machado failed to advance into the semifinals, as he placed thirty-second overall in the preliminary heats.

Machado also competed in the 4×100-metre medley, along with Eduardo Fischer, Kaio de Almeida, and Jader Souza. Swimming the backstroke leg, Machado recorded a time of 57.33 seconds, and the Brazilian team finished the preliminary heats in fifteenth place, with a final time of 3:44.41.
