= Aline Santos =

Brazilian handball player (born 1981)

Aline Silva dos Santos (born 17 August, 1981), known as Aline Santos or simply Aline, is a Brazilian handball player. She has represented the Brazilian national team in two Olympics. She participated at the 2004 Summer Olympics in Athens and at the 2008 Summer Olympics in China.
