= Maravilha (footballer) =

Brazilian footballer (born 1973)

Personal information
- Full name: Marlisa Wahlbrink
- Date of birth: 10 April 1973 (age 53)
- Place of birth: Porto Alegre, Brazil
- Height: 1.72 m (5 ft 7 1/2 in)
- Position: Goalkeeper

Senior career*
Years	Team	Apps	(Gls)
2001–2004	Grêmio		

International career
- Brazil
- * Club domestic league appearances and goals

Marlisa Wahlbrink (born April 10, 1973), also known as Maravilha, is a Brazilian former football player and goalkeeper in the women's national team. She played and trained internationally for Grêmio Foot-Ball Porto Alegrense, and also, served as a two-time member of the Brazilian national team at the 2000 and 2004 Summer Olympics.

In 1997 Wahlbrink was playing for São Paulo FC.
