= Adalberto Silva =

Brazilian handball player (born 1979)

Personal information
- Full name: Adalberto Pereira da Silva
- Nationality: Brazil
- Born: 12 May 1979 (age 47) Teófilo Otoni, Brazil
- Height: 1.89 m (6 ft 2 in)

Sport
- Sport: Handball
- Position: right wing

Senior clubs
- Years: Team
- 2003-2006: São Bernardo do Campo
National team
- Years: Team
- –: Brazil

Adalberto Pereira da Silva Nascimento (born 12 May 1979) is a Brazilian male handball player. He was a member of the Brazil men's national handball team, playing as a right wing. He played at the 2004 Summer Olympics. He was a member of São Bernardo do Campo from 2003 to 2006.
