= Rafael de Gouveira Junior =

Brazilian equestrian

Personal information
- Born: 16 November 1982 (age 43) Atibaia, Brazil

Sport
- Sport: Equestrian
Medal record
Equestrian
Representing Brazil
Pan American Games
Bronze medal – third place	2003 Fair Hill	Team eventing

Rafael de Gouveira Junior (born 16 November 1982) is a Brazilian equestrian. He competed in two events at the 2004 Summer Olympics.
