= Sérgio Marins =

Brazilian equestrian

Personal information
- Born: 27 December 1969 (age 55); Belo Horizonte, Brazil

Sport
- Sport: Equestrian

Sérgio Marins (born 27 December 1969) is a Brazilian equestrian. He competed in two events at the 2004 Summer Olympics.
