= Remo Tellini =

Brazilian equestrian

Personal information
- Born: 11 October 1972 (age 52); Franca, Brazil

Sport
- Sport: Equestrian

Remo Tellini (born 11 October 1972) is a Brazilian equestrian. He competed in two events at the 2004 Summer Olympics.
