= Raul de Senna =

Brazilian equestrian

Personal information
- Born: 17 June 1983 (age 43) Belo Horizonte, Brazil

Sport
- Sport: Equestrian
Medal record
Equestrian
Representing Brazil
Pan American Games
Bronze medal – third place	2003 Fair Hill	Team eventing

Raul de Senna (born 17 June 1983) is a Brazilian equestrian. He competed in two events at the 2004 Summer Olympics.
