= Winsome Andante =

English imported crossbred eventer

- Breed: British Sport Horse
- Sire: Saunter (Thoroughbred)
- Grandsire: Charlottesville (Thoroughbred)
- Dam: Juswith Genoa (British Sport Horse)
- Maternal grandsire: Bohemond (Thoroughbred)
- Sex: Gelding
- Foaled: April 6, 1993; United Kingdom
- Died: 2019
- Country: United States
- Colour: Bay with star, white to coronet left-fore, to upper pastern both hind
- Breeder: Janet and Chris Gooch
- Owner: Linda Wachtmeister and Plain Dealing Farm, Inc

Winsome Andante
Medal record

Equestrian

Olympic Games
Silver medal – second place	2004 Athens	Individual eventing
Bronze medal – third place	2004 Athens	Team eventing

World Championships
Gold medal – first place	2002 Jerez	Team eventing

Winsome Andante (April 6, 1993 – September 25, 2019) was an English imported crossbred eventer (84.5% Thoroughbred, 9.5% Arabian, and 6% Irish) who competed successfully to the highest levels of the sport of eventing with rider Kimberly Severson. Winsome Andante won the Rolex CCI**** a record three times. He also competed at the Burghley Horse Trials, as well as in the Olympics and the World Equestrian Games.

"Dan" competed in 47 competitions between 2000 and 2007. Of those, he placed in the top three in 39 events. He stood 16.1 hands (65 inches, 165 cm).

In 2003, Winsome Andante underwent colic surgery. After recovery he won the 2004 Rolex Kentucky CCI****.

In November 2006, Dan rose to the top of the USEA Leader Board, ahead of retired Giltedge, with a total of 1,184 career points. He would remain at the top of the leaderboard for over 10 years. He was named United States Eventing Association Horse of the Year three times.

Dan was retired in November 2007 due to a hind limb lameness.

Winsome Andante died aged 26 in 2019.

== Top Placings ==
- Winner of the 2001 Blenheim Horse Trials
- Winner of the 2002 Rolex Kentucky CCI****
- Winner of Over the Walls Horse Trials in 2002
- Individual 6th place and Team Gold at the World Equestrian Games in Jerez, Spain
- Winner of the 2004 Rolex Kentucky CCI****
- Winner of the individual silver and team bronze medal at the Athens Olympics in 2004
- Winner of the 2005 Rolex Kentucky CCI****
- Member of the US Eventing Team at the 2006 World Equestrian Games in Aachen (team finished in fourth place)
- Top of the USEA Leader Board (as of 2006)
- 3rd at the 2007 Badminton Horse Trials CCI****
