= Kimberly Severson =

American equestrian

Medal record

Equestrian

Representing United States

Olympic Games
Silver medal – second place	2004 Athens	Individual Eventing
Bronze medal – third place	2004 Athens	Team Eventing

World Equestrian Games
Gold medal – first place	2002 Jerez	Team Eventing

Kimberly "Kim" Severson (born August 22, 1973, in Tucson, Arizona) is a highly successful international equestrian. She took several years of dressage lessons before training in eventing, and began with a background in Pony Club. One of her first upper level event horses was Jerry McGerry, whom she took intermediate.

Her most well known mount is the English Thoroughbred gelding Winsome Adante (a.k.a. "Dan") owned by Linda Wachtmeister and Plain Dealing Farm. The pair won the Rolex Kentucky Three Day three times, an unmatched feat. Dan was retired in a ceremony at Rolex in 2008.

She currently lives in Keene, Virginia.

== Awards ==
- 1999 Rolex Kentucky CCI*** First Place with Over the Limit
- USEA's Lady Rider of the Year 2001, 2002, 2004, 2005
- 2002 World Equestrian Games in Jerez, Spain Team Gold with Winsome Adante
- 2002 Rolex Kentucky CCI**** First Place with Winsome Adante
- 2004 Rolex Kentucky CCI**** First Place (full format with steeplechase) with Winsome Adante
- 2004 Athens Olympics Individual Silver Medal and Team Bronze with Winsome Adante
- 2005 Rolex Kentucky CCI**** First Place with Winsome Adante
- 2006 FEI World Equestrian Games 17th Individually with Winsome Adante - Team finished 4th
- 2007 The Fork CICW-*** First Place with Winsome Adante
- 2007 Badminton CCI**** Third Place with Winsome Adante

== CCI5* results ==
Results
Event	Kentucky	Badminton	Luhmühlen	Burghley	Pau	Adelaide
2002	(gold) (Winsome Adante)					
2003	Did not participate					
2004	(gold) (Winsome Adante)					
2005	(gold) (Winsome Adante)		4th (Royal Venture)	EL (Winsome Adante)		
2006	RET (Royal Venture)					
2007		(bronze) (Winsome Adante)				
2008	5th (Tipperary Liadhnan)					
2009	Did not participate					
2010	24th (Tipperary Liadhnan)					
2011	16th (Tipperary Liadhnan)					
2012-13	Did not participate					
2014	11th (Fernhill Fearless)					
2015	Did not participate					
2016	RET (Fernhill Fearless)					
2017	RET (Cooley Cross Border)					
2018	21st (Cooley Cross Border)				17th (Cooley Cross Border)	
2019	Did not participate					
EL = Eliminated; RET = Retired; WD = Withdrew
