= John Williams (equestrian) =

American equestrian (born 1965)

Olympic medal record

Equestrian

Representing United States

Olympic Games
Bronze medal – third place	2004 Athens	Team Eventing

World Equestrian Games
Gold medal – first place	2002 Jerez	Team Eventing

John Williams (born April 4, 1965) is an American equestrian, who competed as part of the US Eventing team at the 2004 Summer Olympics, winning the bronze medal.

Williams was born in Mendon, New York, and attended the Rochester Institute of Technology's School for American Craftsman, where he graduated after studying furniture design and woodworking. Williams now resides in Floyd, Virginia.

Williams trained with many great eventers, including Jack Le Goff, James C. Wofford, and David O'Connor (equestrian). Williams is a USEF ‘S’ licensed Course Designer and Technical Delegate for Eventing and also a licensed FEI Course Designer and Technical Delegate. John has designed courses throughout the US, Canada, and Central and South America.

== Career highlights ==
2004

- Olympic Games, bronze medal, individually 28th place (Carrick)

2002

- Team gold at the World Equestrian Games, individually 4th, Jerez, Spain
- 2nd Rolex Kentucky Three Day Event CCI**** (Carrick)
- 6th MBNA Foxhall Cup CCI*** (Sloopy)

2001

- 4th Morven Park Spring Horse Trials
- 12th Rolex Kentucky Three Day Event CCI**** (Carrick)

1999

- Selected to compete in Olympic Test Event, Sydney, Australia

1998

- 5th Radnor CCI**

1997

- Long-listed, European Championships

1996

- 2nd National Intermediate Championships, Radnor CCI**

1995

- 1st Mid-Atlantic Horse Trials Series
- 3rd National Intermediate Championships, Radnor CCI**, PA 3rd/

1994

- 3rd National Intermediate Championships, Radnor CCI**
- Winner National DeBroke Championships
- Long-listed, World Championships

1993

- 4th Rolex Kentucky Three Day Event, CCI***

1992

- Long-listed, Olympic Games

1991

- Pan American Games Three-Day Event Championship, Chatsworth, GA

1988

- 1st Intermediate CCI National Championship at Radnor
