= Rowing at the 2008 Summer Olympics – Qualification =

== Qualification rules ==
A nation may earn up to 1 boat in each of the 14 Rowing events.

Note that though crew members' names are given below, for boats which qualified at the 2007 World Championships the crew racing at the Olympics is not required to include the same crew members as the crew which qualified.

== Summary ==
Nation	Men								Women						Crews	Rowers
Nation	M1X	M2-	M2X	M4-	M4X	M8+	LM2X	LM4-	W1X	W2-	W2X	W4X	W8+	LW2X	Crews	Rowers
Algeria	X						X								2	3
Argentina	X								X						2	2
Australia	X	X	X	X	X	X	X	X	X	X	X	X	X	X	14	48
Belarus			X	X	X				X	X					5	13
Belgium	X		X												2	3
Brazil	X						X		X					X	4	6
Bulgaria			X						X						2	3
Cameroon	X														1	1
Canada		X				X	X	X		X		X	X	X	8	34
Chile	X								X						2	2
China	X		X	X		X	X	X	X	X	X	X		X	11	32
Chinese Taipei	X														1	1
Colombia	X														1	1
Croatia		X	X												2	4
Cuba					X		X		X					X	4	9
Czech Republic	X	X		X	X				X		X				6	14
Denmark		X					X	X						X	4	10
Egypt	X							X	X						3	6
El Salvador									X						1	1
Estonia	X		X		X										3	7
Finland														X	1	2
France		X	X	X	X		X	X	X	X					8	21
Germany	X	X	X	X	X	X	X	X		X	X	X	X	X	13	45
Great Britain	X	X	X	X		X	X	X		X	X	X	X	X	12	43
Greece	X						X							X	3	5
Honduras	X														1	1
Hong Kong	X						X		X						3	4
Hungary							X								1	2
India	X						X								2	3
Iran	X								X						2	2
Iraq			X												1	2
Ireland				X				X							2	8
Italy		X		X	X		X	X	X		X				7	19
Japan							X							X	2	4
Kazakhstan									X					X	2	3
Kenya	X														1	1
Lithuania	X														1	1
Mexico	X													X	2	3
Monaco	X														1	1
Myanmar									X						1	1
Netherlands	X			X		X		X					X	X	6	29
New Zealand	X	X	X	X			X		X	X	X				8	16
Norway	X														1	1
Poland		X			X	X		X	X						5	20
Portugal							X								1	2
Romania										X	X		X		3	11
Russia			X		X							X			3	10
Serbia		X							X						2	3
Slovenia			X	X	X										3	10
South Africa		X							X					X	3	5
South Korea							X		X					X	3	5
Spain									X						1	1
Sweden	X								X						2	2
Switzerland	X														1	1
Ukraine					X						X	X			3	10
United States	X	X	X	X	X	X		X	X	X	X	X	X	X	13	45
Uruguay	X						X								2	3
Uzbekistan	X														1	1
Venezuela	X														1	1
Zimbabwe									X						1	1
Total: 60 NOCs	33	14	15	13	13	8	20	13	26	10	10	8	7	17	207	548

== Qualification timeline ==
Event	Date	Venue
2007 World Rowing Championships	Aug 26 - Sep 2, 2007	(Germany) Munich
2007 All-Africa Games	July 19–21, 2007	(Algeria) Algiers
Latin America Qualification Regatta *	November 16–18, 2007	(Brazil) Rio de Janeiro
Asian Qualification Regatta	April 25–27, 2008	(China) Shanghai
Final Qualification Regatta **	June 15–18, 2008	(Poland) Poznań

* Open to NOCs that are members of Organización Deportiva Panamericana, with the exception of USA and Canada.

** Open to all NOCs except in the M1x, LM2x, W1x and LW2x events where the NOCs from Africa, Asia and Latin America are excluded.

== Single Sculls Men ==
#	Nation	Qualification Tournament	Place in QT	Rower
1	New Zealand	2007 Worlds	1	Mahé Drysdale
2	Czech Republic	2007 Worlds	2	Ondřej Synek
3	Norway	2007 Worlds	3	Olaf Tufte
4	Great Britain	2007 Worlds	4	Alan Campbell
5	Germany	2007 Worlds	5	Marcel Hacker
6	Sweden	2007 Worlds	6	Lassi Karonen
7	Belgium	2007 Worlds	7	Tim Maeyens
8	Argentina	2007 Worlds	8	Santiago Fernández
9	Switzerland	2007 Worlds	9	André Vonarburg
10	Netherlands	2007 Worlds	10	Sjoerd Hamburger
11	Australia	2007 Worlds	11	Peter Hardcastle
12	China	Asian Regatta	1	Zhang Liang
13	India	Asian Regatta	2	Bajrang Lal Takhar
14	Iran	Asian Regatta	3	Mohsen Shadi
15	Hong Kong	Asian Regatta	4	Law Hiu Fung
16	Uzbekistan	Asian Regatta	5	Ruslan Naurzaliev
17	Chinese Taipei	Asian Regatta	6	Wang Ming-Hui
18	Egypt	African Games	1	Ali Ibrahim
19	Algeria	African Games	3	Chaouki Dries
20	Cameroon	African Games	5	Paul Etia Ndoumbe
21	Kenya	African Games	6	Mathew Minanga Lidaywa
22	Brazil	Latin America Regatta	1	Anderson Nocetti
23	Mexico	Latin America Regatta	2	Patrick Loliger Salas
24	Chile	Latin America Regatta	3	Oscar Vasquez Ochoa
25	Venezuela	Latin America Regatta	4	Dhiso Hernandez Echezuria
26	Uruguay	Latin America Regatta	5	Leandro Salvagno Rattaro
27	Colombia	Latin America Regatta	6	Rodrigo Ideus
28	United States	Final Continental	1	Kenneth Jurkowski
29	Lithuania	Final Continental	2	Mindaugas Griskonis
30	Estonia	Final Continental	3	Andrei Jämsä
31	Greece*	Final Continental	4	Ioannis Christou
32	Honduras	Invitational		
33	Monaco	Invitational		

== Pairs Men ==
#	Nation	Qualification Tournament	Place in QT	Rowers
1	Australia	2007 Worlds	1	Drew Ginn, Duncan Free
2	New Zealand	2007 Worlds	2	Nathan Twaddle, George Bridgewater
3	Great Britain	2007 Worlds	3	Colin Smith, Matt Langridge
4	France	2007 Worlds	4	Erwan Peron, Laurent Cadot
5	South Africa	2007 Worlds	5	Ramon di Clemente, Donovan Cech
6	Serbia	2007 Worlds	6	Goran Jagar, Nikola Stojić
7	Poland	2007 Worlds	7	Piotr Hojka, Jarosław Godek
8	United States	2007 Worlds	8	Jason Read, Kyle Larson
9	Germany	2007 Worlds	9	Andreas Penkner, Jochen Urban
10	Croatia	2007 Worlds	10	Siniša Skelin, Nikša Skelin
11	Denmark	2007 Worlds	11	Morten Nielsen, Thomas Larsen
12	Canada	Final Continental	1	Dave Calder, Scott Frandsen
13	Italy	Final Continental	2	Giuseppe De Vita, Raffaello Leonardo
14	Czech Republic*	Final Continental	3	Jakub Makovicka, Václav Chalupa

== Double Sculls Men ==
#	Nation	Qualification Tournament	Place in QT	Rowers
1	Slovenia	2007 Worlds	1	Luka Špik, Iztok Čop
2	France	2007 Worlds	2	Jean-Baptiste Macquet, Adrien Hardy
3	Estonia	2007 Worlds	3	Jüri Jaanson, Tõnu Endrekson
4	Great Britain	2007 Worlds	4	Matthew Wells, Stephen Rowbotham
5	Belarus	2007 Worlds	5	Dzianis Mihal, Stanislau Shcharbachenia
6	New Zealand	2007 Worlds	6	Nathan Cohen, Matthew Trott
7	Croatia	2007 Worlds	7	Mario Vekic, Ante Kusurin
8	Australia	2007 Worlds	8	Scott Brennan, David Crawshay
9	United States	2007 Worlds	9	Samuel Stitt, Matthew Hughes
10	Germany	2007 Worlds	10	Christian Schreiber, Rene Burmeister
11	Belgium	2007 Worlds	11	Stijn Smulders, Christophe Raes
12	China	Final Continental	1	Su Hui, Zhang Liang
13	Russia	Final Continental	2	Aleksandr Kornilov, Aleksey Svirin
14	Bulgaria*	Final Continental	3	Ivo Yanakiev, Martin Yanakiev
15	Iraq	Invitational		

== Fours Men ==
#	Nation	Qualification Tournament	Place in QT	Rowers
1	New Zealand	2007 Worlds	1	Meyer, Dallinger, Murray, Bond
2	Italy	2007 Worlds	2	Mornati, Sartori, Mornati, Carboncini
3	Netherlands	2007 Worlds	3	Cirkel, Vellenga, Gabriels, Vermeulen
4	Great Britain	2007 Worlds	4	Williams, Reed, Partridge, Triggs-Hodge
5	Slovenia	2007 Worlds	5	Pirih, Rozman, Kolander, Pirih
6	France	2007 Worlds	6	Desprès, Rondeau, Chardin, Mortelette
7	Czech Republic	2007 Worlds	7	Horvath, Gruber, Bruncvik, Neffe
8	United States	2007 Worlds	8	Hoopman, Schnobrich, Lanzone, Volpenhein
9	Germany	2007 Worlds	9	Hauffe, Seifert, Kaeufer, Adamski
10	Ireland	2007 Worlds	10	O'Neill, Folan, Casey, Martin
11	Belarus	2007 Worlds	11	Lialin, Dzemyanenka, Nosau, Kazubouski
12	Australia	Final Continental	1	Alfred, Marburg, McKenzie, Hegerty
13	China	Final Continental	2	Zhang, Zhao, Guo, Song

== Quadruple Sculls Men ==
#	Nation	Qualification Tournament	Place in QT	Rowers
1	Poland	2007 Worlds	1	Wasielewski, Kolbowicz, Jelinski, Korol
2	France	2007 Worlds	2	Bernard, Berrest, Coeffic, Bahain
3	Germany	2007 Worlds	3	Bertram, Brodowski, Gruhne, Sens
4	Italy	2007 Worlds	4	Ghezzi, Gattinoni, Galtarossa, Raineri
5	Czech Republic	2007 Worlds	5	Vitásek, Karas, Hanák, Jirka
6	Ukraine	2007 Worlds	6	Pavlovskyi, Prokopenko, Biloushchenko, Gryn
7	Russia	2007 Worlds	7	Morgachyov, Svirin, Kornilov, Bikua-Mfantse
8	Estonia	2007 Worlds	8	Taimsoo, Latin, Kuzmin, Raja
9	United States	2007 Worlds	9	Du Ross, McEachern, Schroeder, Flickinger
10	Australia	2007 Worlds	10	Morgan, Gatti, McRae, Kelly
11	Cuba	2007 Worlds	11	Cascaret, Fournier, Concepción, Hernández
12	Belarus	Final Continental	1	Lemiashkevich, Novikau, Shurmei, Radzevich
13	Slovenia	Final Continental	2	Zupanc, Jurse, Jurse, Fistravec

== Eights Men ==
#	Nation	Qualification Tournament	Place in QT
1	Canada	2007 Worlds	1
2	Germany	2007 Worlds	2
3	Great Britain	2007 Worlds	3
4	United States	2007 Worlds	4
5	Poland	2007 Worlds	5
6	China	2007 Worlds	6
7	Australia	2007 Worlds	7
8	Netherlands	Final Continental	1

== Double Sculls Lightweight Men ==
#	Nation	Qualification Tournament	Place in QT	Rowers
1	Denmark	2007 Worlds	1	Mads Rasmussen, Rasmus Quist Hansen
2	Greece	2007 Worlds	2	Dimitrios Mougios, Vasileios Polymeros
3	Great Britain	2007 Worlds	3	Zac Purchase, Mark Hunter
4	Australia	2007 Worlds	4	Samuel Beltz, Thomas Gibson
5	Italy	2007 Worlds	5	Marcello Miani, Elia Luini
6	Japan	2007 Worlds	6	Kazushige Ura, Daisaku Takeda
7	Hungary	2007 Worlds	7	Zsolt Hirling, Tamás Varga
8	Germany	2007 Worlds	8	Joerg Lehnigk, Manuel Brehmer
9	China	2007 Worlds	9	Zhang Guolin, Sun Jie
10	France	2007 Worlds	10	Fabrice Moreau, Frédéric Dufour
—	Austria	2007 Worlds	11	Juliusz Madecki, Sebastian Sageder
11	Hong Kong	Asian Regatta	1	So Sau Wah, Chow Kwong Wing
12	India	Asian Regatta	2	Devender Kumar, Manjeet Singh
13	South Korea	Asian Regatta	3	Park Tae-Hwan, Jang Kang-Eun
14	Algeria	African Games	1	Kamel Ait Daoud, Mohamed Garidi
15	Cuba	Latin America Regatta	1	Eyder Batista Vargas, Yunior Perez Aguilera
16	Brazil	Latin America Regatta	2	Thiago Gomes, Thiago Almeida
17	Uruguay	Latin America Regatta	3	Rodolfo Collazo Tourn, Angel García
18	New Zealand	Final Continental	1	Storm Uru, Peter Taylor
19	Portugal	Final Continental	2	Pedro Fraga, Nuno Mendes
20	Canada*	Final Continental	3	Douglas Vandor, Cameron Sylvester

== Fours Lightweight Men ==
#	Nation	Qualification Tournament	Place in QT	Rowers
1	Great Britain	2007 Worlds	1	Chambers, Lindsay-Fynn, Mattick, Clarke
2	France	2007 Worlds	2	Solforosi, Pouge, Bette, Tilliet
3	Italy	2007 Worlds	3	Vlcek, Amarante, Amitrano, Mascarenhas
4	Canada	2007 Worlds	4	Brambell, Beare, Lewis, Parsons
5	China	2007 Worlds	5	Huang, Wu, Zhang, Tian
6	Denmark	2007 Worlds	6	Helleberg, Ebbesen, Jørgensen, Andersen
7	Australia	2007 Worlds	7	Chisholm, Edwards, Cureton, Skipworth
8	Poland	2007 Worlds	8	Rańda, Pawełczak, Bernatajtys, Pawlowski
9	Egypt	2007 Worlds	9	Ibrahim, Azouz, Gad, Ramadan
10	Netherlands	2007 Worlds	10	van der Linden, Snijders, Lievens, Drewes
11	United States	2007 Worlds	11	Bolton, Farrell, Todd, Paradiso
12	Germany	Final Continental	1	Seibt, Schoemann-Finck, J. Kühner, M. Kühner
13	Ireland	Final Continental	2	Moynihan, Towey, Archibald, Griffin

== Single sculls women ==
#	Nation	Qualification Tournament	Place in QT	Rower
1	Belarus	2007 Worlds	1	Ekaterina Karsten-Khodotovitch
2	Bulgaria	2007 Worlds	2	Rumyana Neykova
3	United States	2007 Worlds	3	Michelle Guerette
4	Czech Republic	2007 Worlds	4	Miroslava Knapková
5	China	2007 Worlds	5	Zhang Xiuyun
6	New Zealand	2007 Worlds	6	Emma Twigg
7	France	2007 Worlds	7	Sophie Balmary
8	Poland	2007 Worlds	8	Julia Michalska
9	Sweden	2007 Worlds	9	Frida Svensson
10	South Korea	Asian Regatta	1	Shin Yeong-Eun
11	Kazakhstan	Asian Regatta	2	Inga Dudchenko
12	Hong Kong	Asian Regatta	3	Lee Ka Man
13	Iran	Asian Regatta	4	Homa Hosseini
14	Myanmar	Asian Regatta	5	Latt Shwe Zin
15	South Africa	African Games	1	Hendrika Geyser
16	Egypt	African Games	3	Imen Mustapha
17	Zimbabwe	African Games	4	Elana Hill
18	Chile	Latin America Regatta	1	Soraya Jadue Arriaza
19	Brazil	Latin America Regatta	2	Fabiana Beltrame
20	Cuba	Latin America Regatta	3	Maira Gonzalez Borroto
21	Argentina	Latin America Regatta	4	Gabriela Best
22	El Salvador	Latin America Regatta	5	Camila Vargas Palomo
23	Australia	Final Continental	1	Phillipa Savage
24	Italy	Final Continental	2	Gabriella Bascelli
25	Serbia	Final Continental	3	Iva Obradovic
26	Spain*	Final Continental	4	Nuria Domínguez

== Pairs Women ==
#	Nation	Qualification Tournament	Place in QT	Rowers
1	Belarus	2007 Worlds	1	Yuliya Bichyk, Natallia Helakh
2	Germany	2007 Worlds	2	Nicole Zimmermann, Elke Hipler
3	Romania	2007 Worlds	3	Georgeta Damian, Viorica Susanu
4	Australia	2007 Worlds	4	Kim Crow, Sara Cook
5	New Zealand	2007 Worlds	5	Juliette Haigh, Nicky Coles
6	China	2007 Worlds	6	Zhang Yage, Gao Yulan
7	United States	2007 Worlds	7	Portia McGee, Anna Mickelson
8	Canada	2007 Worlds	8	Darcy Marquardt, Jane Thornton
9	France	Final Continental	1	Inene Pascal-Pretre, Stephanie Dechand
10	Great Britain	Final Continental	2	Olivia Whitlam, Louisa Reeve

== Double Sculls Women ==
#	Nation	Qualification Tournament	Place in QT	Rowers
5	China	2007 Worlds	1	Li Qin, Tian Liang
4	New Zealand	2007 Worlds	2	Georgina Evers-Swindell, Caroline Evers-Swindell
1	Great Britain	2007 Worlds	3	Elise Laverick, Anna Bebington
2	Romania	2007 Worlds	4	Ioana Papuc, Simona Muşat
3	Czech Republic	2007 Worlds	5	Gabriela Varekova, Jitka Antosova
6	Germany	2007 Worlds	6	Peggy Waleska, Christiane Huth
7	Italy	2007 Worlds	7	Laura Schiavone, Elisabetta Sancassani
8	United States	2007 Worlds	8	Jennifer Kaido, Ala Piotrowski
9	Ukraine	Final Continental	1	Kateryna Tarasenko, Yana Dementyeva
10	Australia	Final Continental	2	Sonia Mills, Catriona Sens

== Quadruple Sculls Women ==
#	Nation	Qualification Tournament	Place in QT	Rowers
1	Great Britain	2007 Worlds	1	Vernon, Flood, Houghton, Grainger
2	Germany	2007 Worlds	2	Boron, Lutze, Oppelt, Schiller
3	China	2007 Worlds	3	Tang, Xi, Jin, Feng
4	Ukraine	2007 Worlds	4	Kolesnikova, Huba, Olefirenko, Dementieva
5	Canada	2007 Worlds	5	de Jong, Hanson, Guloien, de Zwager
6	United States	2007 Worlds	6	Pernell, Malcos, Brown, Tomek
7	Australia	2007 Worlds	7	Ives, Mills, Sens, Pratley
8	Russia	Final Continental	1	Merk, Fedotova, Dorodnova, Kalinovskaya

== Eights Women ==
#	Nation	Qualification Tournament	Place in QT
1	United States	2007 Worlds	1
2	Romania	2007 Worlds	2
3	Great Britain	2007 Worlds	3
4	Australia	2007 Worlds	4
5	Germany	2007 Worlds	5
6	Canada	Final Continental	1
7	Netherlands	Final Continental	2

== Double Sculls Lightweight Women ==
#	Nation	Qualification Tournament	Place in QT	Rowers
1	Australia	2007 Worlds	1	Amber Halliday, Marguerite Houston
2	Finland	2007 Worlds	2	Sanna Stén, Minna Nieminen
3	Denmark	2007 Worlds	3	Katrin Olsen, Juliane Rasmussen
4	Germany	2007 Worlds	3	Berit Carow, Marie-Louise Dräger
5	Greece	2007 Worlds	5	Chrysi Biskitzi, Alexandra Tsiavou
6	China	2007 Worlds	6	Xu Dongxiang, Chen Haixia
7	Canada	2007 Worlds	7	Lindsay Jennerich, Tracy Cameron
8	Great Britain	2007 Worlds	8	Helen Casey, Hester Goodsell
9	Japan	Asian Regatta	1	Akiko Iwamoto, Misaki Kumakura
10	Kazakhstan	Asian Regatta	2	Natalya Voronova, Alexandra Opachanova
11	South Korea	Asian Regatta	3	Ko Young-Eun, Ji Yoo-Jin
12	South Africa	African Games	1	Alexandra White, Catherine Shaw
13	Cuba	Latin America Regatta	1	Ismaray Marrero Aria, Yaima Velazquez
14	Mexico	Latin America Regatta	2	Gabriela Huerta Trillo, Lila Perezrul
15	Brazil	Latin America Regatta	3	Camila Carvalho, Luciana Granato
16	Netherlands	Final Continental	1	Kirsten van der Kolk, Marit van Eupen
17	United States	Final Continental	2	Renee Hykel, Jennifer Goldsack

* Nation invited via Unused Quota Places.
