= Rowing at the 2008 Summer Olympics – Men's lightweight coxless four =

Men's lightweight coxless four at the Games of the XXIX Olympiad

Medalists
1st place, gold medalist(s)		Thomas Ebert; Morten Jørgensen; Mads Andersen; Eskild Ebbesen	Denmark
2nd place, silver medalist(s)		Łukasz Pawłowski; Bartłomiej Pawełczak; Miłosz Bernatajtys; Paweł Rańda	Poland
3rd place, bronze medalist(s)		Iain Brambell; Jon Beare; Mike Lewis; Liam Parsons	Canada

Men's lightweight coxless four competition at the 2008 Summer Olympics in Beijing was held from August 10 to 17 at the Shunyi Olympic Rowing-Canoeing Park.

This rowing event is a sweep rowing event, meaning that each rower has one oar and rows on only one side. Four rowers crew each boat, and no coxswain is used. As a lightweight rowing event, rowers were limited to a maximum body mass of 72.5 kilograms each and 70 kilograms on average.

The competition consisted of multiple rounds. Finals were held to determine the placing of each boat; these finals were given letters with those nearer to the beginning of the alphabet meaning a better ranking. Semifinals were named based on which finals they fed, with each semifinal having two possible finals.

During the first round three heats were held. The top three boats in each heat advanced to the A/B semifinals, with the rest moving to the repechage. The repechage was a single heat, with the best three of the four competing boats moving on to the A/B semifinals as well. The fourth-place finisher in the repechage was given an overall ranking of 13th overall, out of the 13 boats in the competition.

Only A/B semifinals were held. For each of the two semifinal races, the top three boats moved on to the better of the two finals (the A final), while the bottom three boats went to the lesser of the two finals (the B final).

The third and final round was the Finals. Each final determined a set of rankings. The A final determined the medals, along with the rest of the places through 6th. The B final gave rankings from 7th to 12th.

== Schedule ==
All times are China Standard Time (UTC+8)

Date	Time	Round
Sunday, August 10, 2008	16:00-16:30	Heats
Tuesday, August 12, 2008	16:40-16:50	Repechage
Friday, August 15, 2008	16:10-16:30	Semifinals A/B
Saturday, August 16, 2008	14:50-15:00	Final B
Sunday, August 17, 2008	16:10-16:20	Final A

== Results ==
=== Heats ===
Qualification Rules: 1-3->SA/B, 4..->R

==== Heat 1 ====
Rank	Rowers	Country	Time	Notes
1	Huang, Wu, Zhang, Tian	China	5:51.30	SA/B
2	Chambers, Lindsay-Fynn, Mattick, Clarke	Great Britain	5:52.38	SA/B
3	Chisholm, Edwards, Cureton, Skipworth	Australia	5:55.18	SA/B
4	van der Linden, Godschalk, Snijders, Drewes	Netherlands	5:57.54	R
5	Zidan, Ramadan, Gad, Ibrahim	Egypt	6:11.71	R

==== Heat 2 ====
Rank	Rowers	Country	Time	Notes
1	Ebert, Jørgensen, Ebbesen, Andersen	Denmark	5:50.12	SA/B
2	Brambell, Beare, Lewis, Parsons	Canada	5:52.13	SA/B
3	Vlcek, Amarante, Amitrano, Mascarenhas	Italy	5:54.12	SA/B
4	Altman, Daly, Todd, Paradiso	United States	5:56.54	R

==== Heat 3 ====
Rank	Rowers	Country	Time	Notes
1	Seibt, Schoemann-Finck, J. Kühner, M. Kühner	Germany	5:50.16	SA/B
2	Solforosi, Raineau, Bette, Tilliet	France	5:51.68	SA/B
3	Pawłowski, Pawełczak, Bernatajtys, Rańda	Poland	5:52.06	SA/B
4	Moynihan, Coakley, Archibald, Griffin	Ireland	5:52.32	R

=== Repechage ===
Qualification Rules: 1-3->SA/B

Rank	Rowers	Country	Time	Notes
1	Moynihan, Towey, Archibald, Griffin	Ireland	6:21.79	SA/B
2	van der Linden, Godschalk, Snijders, Drewes	Netherlands	6:25.25	SA/B
3	Altman, Daly, Todd, Paradiso	United States	6:27.43	SA/B
4	Zidan, Ramadan, Gad, Ibrahim	Egypt	6:37.50	-

=== Semifinals A/B ===
Qualification Rules: 1-3->FA, 4..->FB

==== Semifinal A/B 1 ====
Rank	Rowers	Country	Time	Notes
1	Pawłowski, Pawełczak, Bernatajtys, Rańda	Poland	6:06.60	FA
2	Brambell, Beare, Lewis, Parsons	Canada	6:07.86	FA
3	van der Linden, Godschalk, Snijders, Drewes	Netherlands	6:08.73	FA
4	Chisholm, Edwards, Cureton, Skipworth	Australia	6:12.38	FB
5	Huang, Wu, Zhang, Tian	China	6:12.55	FB
	Seibt, Schoemann-Finck, J. Kühner, M. Kühner	Germany	DNS	

==== Semifinal A/B 2 ====
Rank	Rowers	Country	Time	Notes
1	Ebert, Jørgensen, Ebbesen, Andersen	Denmark	6:05.75	FA
2	Solforosi, Raineau, Bette, Tilliet	France	6:07.26	FA
3	Chambers, Lindsay-Fynn, Mattick, Clarke	Great Britain	6:08.75	FA
4	Moynihan, Towey, Archibald, Griffin	Ireland	6:13.85	FB
5	Vlcek, Amarante, Amitrano, Mascarenhas	Italy	6:14.73	FB
6	Altman, Daly, Todd, Paradiso	United States	6:16.30	FB

=== Final B ===
Rank	Rowers	Country	Time	Notes
1	Vlcek, Amarante, Amitrano, Mascarenhas	Italy	6:03.12	
2	Huang, Wu, Zhang, Tian	China	6:04.99	
3	Chisholm, Edwards, Cureton, Skipworth	Australia	6:05.26	
4	Moynihan, Towey, Archibald, Griffin	Ireland	6:06.02	
5	Altman, Daly, Todd, Paradiso	United States	6:07.79	

=== Final A ===
Rank	Rowers	Country	Time	Notes
Gold medal	Ebert, Jørgensen, Ebbesen, Andersen	Denmark	5:47.76	OB
Silver medal	Pawłowski, Pawełczak, Bernatajtys, Rańda	Poland	5:49.39	
Bronze medal	Brambell, Beare, Lewis, Parsons	Canada	5:50.09	
4	Solforosi, Raineau, Bette, Tilliet	France	5:51.22	
5	Chambers, Lindsay-Fynn, Mattick, Clarke	Great Britain	5:52.12	
6	van der Linden, Godschalk, Snijders, Drewes	Netherlands	5:54.06	
