= Danish Sports Name of the Year =

Annual award in Denmark

Sports Name of the Year
- Native name: Årets Sportsnavn
- Country: Denmark
- Presented by: National Olympic Committee and Sports Confederation of Denmark; Team Danmark (2019–); Jyllands-Posten (1991–2018)
- First award: 1991

Highlights
- Most wins: Denmark women's national handball team & Viktor Axelsen (3)

The Sports Name of the Year (Danish: Årets Sportsnavn) is an annual award presented to the Danish sportsperson or team judged to have delivered the best performance of the year. The award was inaugurated in 1991 and is awarded jointly by the National Olympic Committee and Sports Confederation of Denmark (Danmarks Idrætsforbund, DIF) and Team Danmark; prior to 2019, DIF presented the award with the newspaper Jyllands-Posten. In addition to the award the winner is granted a monetary prize, which as of 2019 stands at DKK 75,000.

The Danish women's national handball team and Viktor Axelsen have won the award three times, the most of any team or individual. Six individuals (Mette Jacobsen, Eskild Ebbesen, Thomas Ebert, Tom Kristensen, Caroline Wozniacki and Lasse Norman Hansen) have won the award twice.

The most recent winner was handball player Mathias Gidsel, who received the award in January 2026 for the 2025 year.

== List of laureates ==
=== By year ===
- Numbers in parentheses indicate a multiple award winner.
- The "finalists" column refers to the other nominees shortlisted for the award

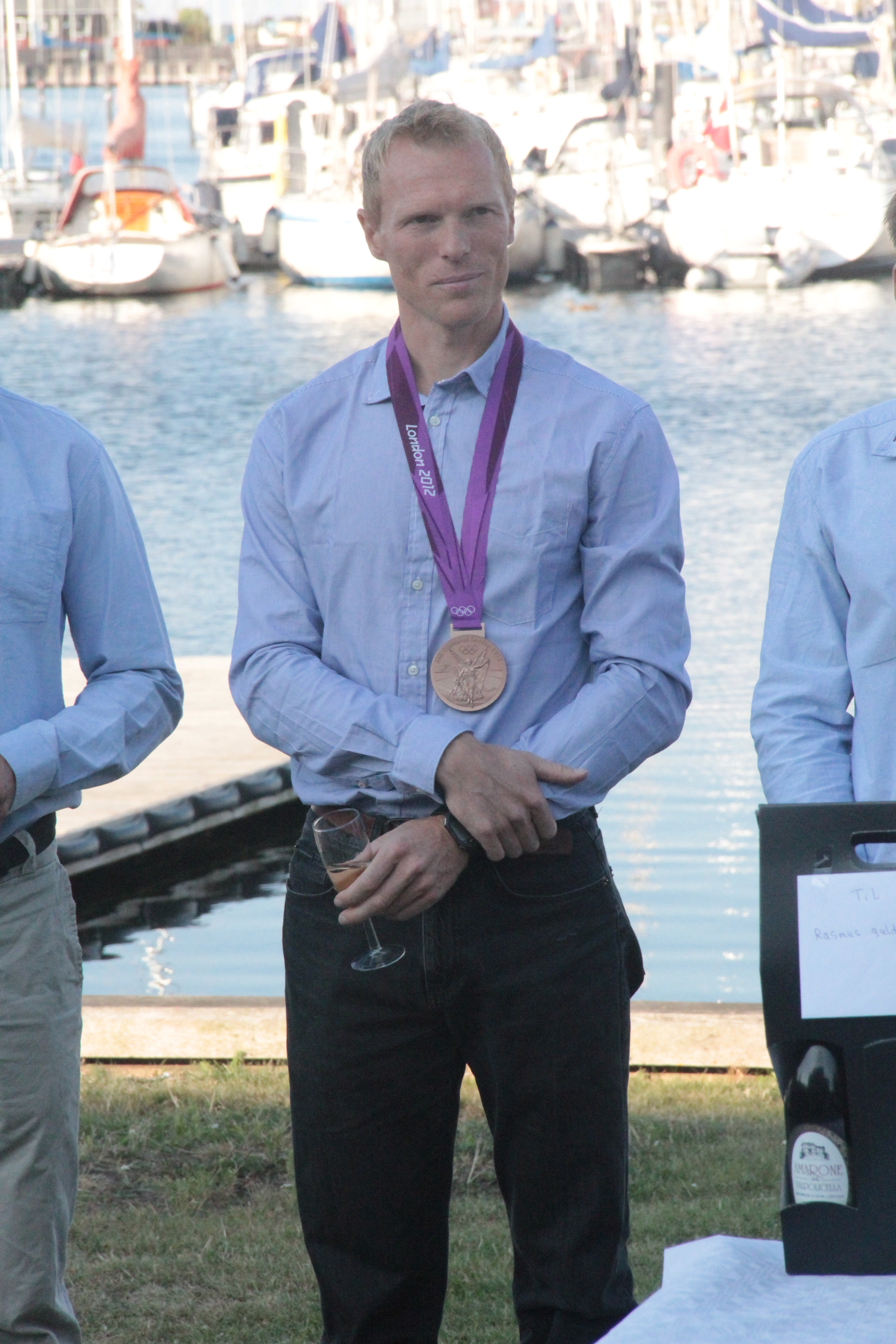
Olympic rower Eskild Ebbesen won in 1998 and 2004

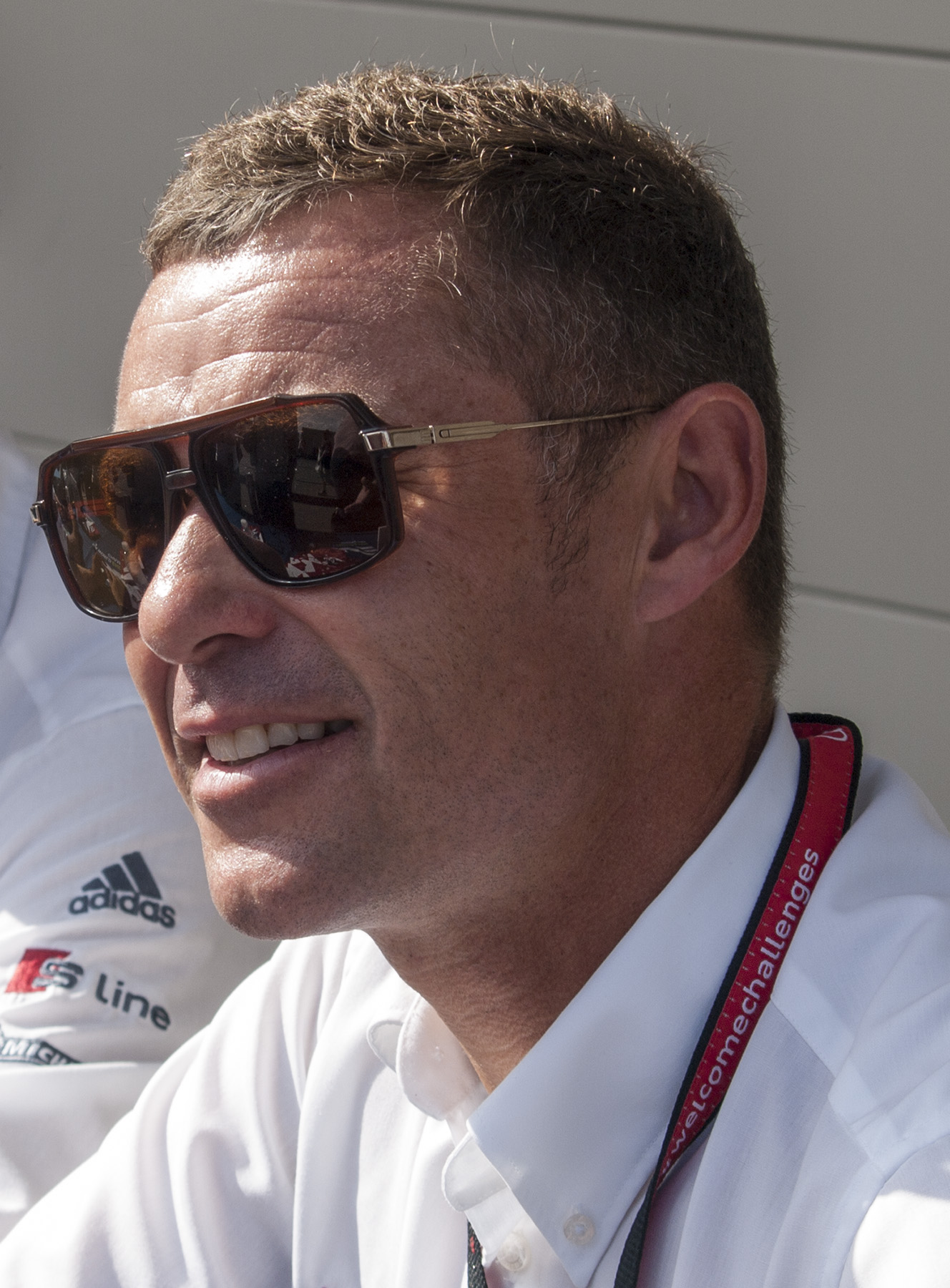
Racing driver Tom Kristensen won in 2002 and 2005

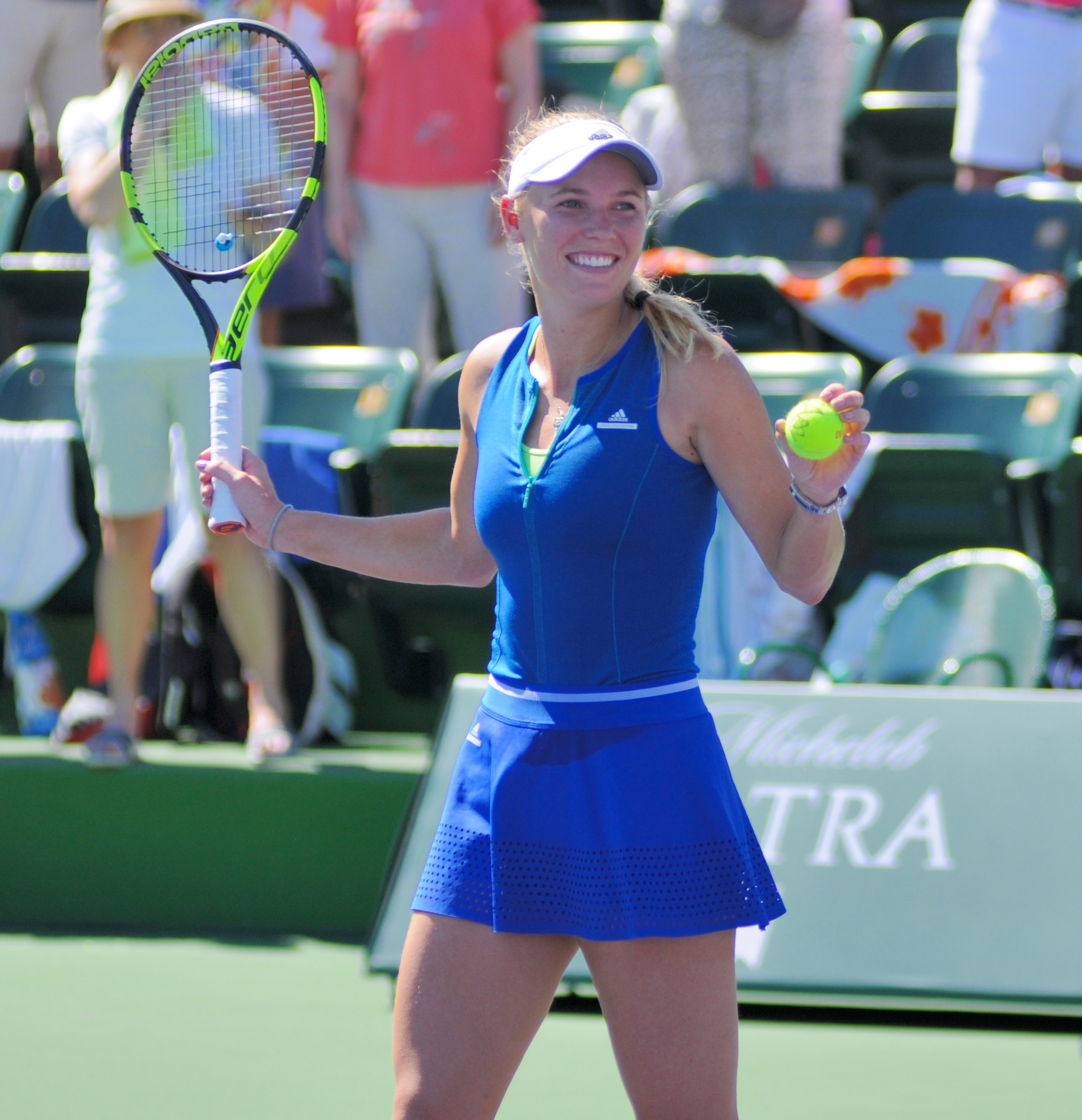
Tennis player Caroline Wozniacki won in 2010 and 2018

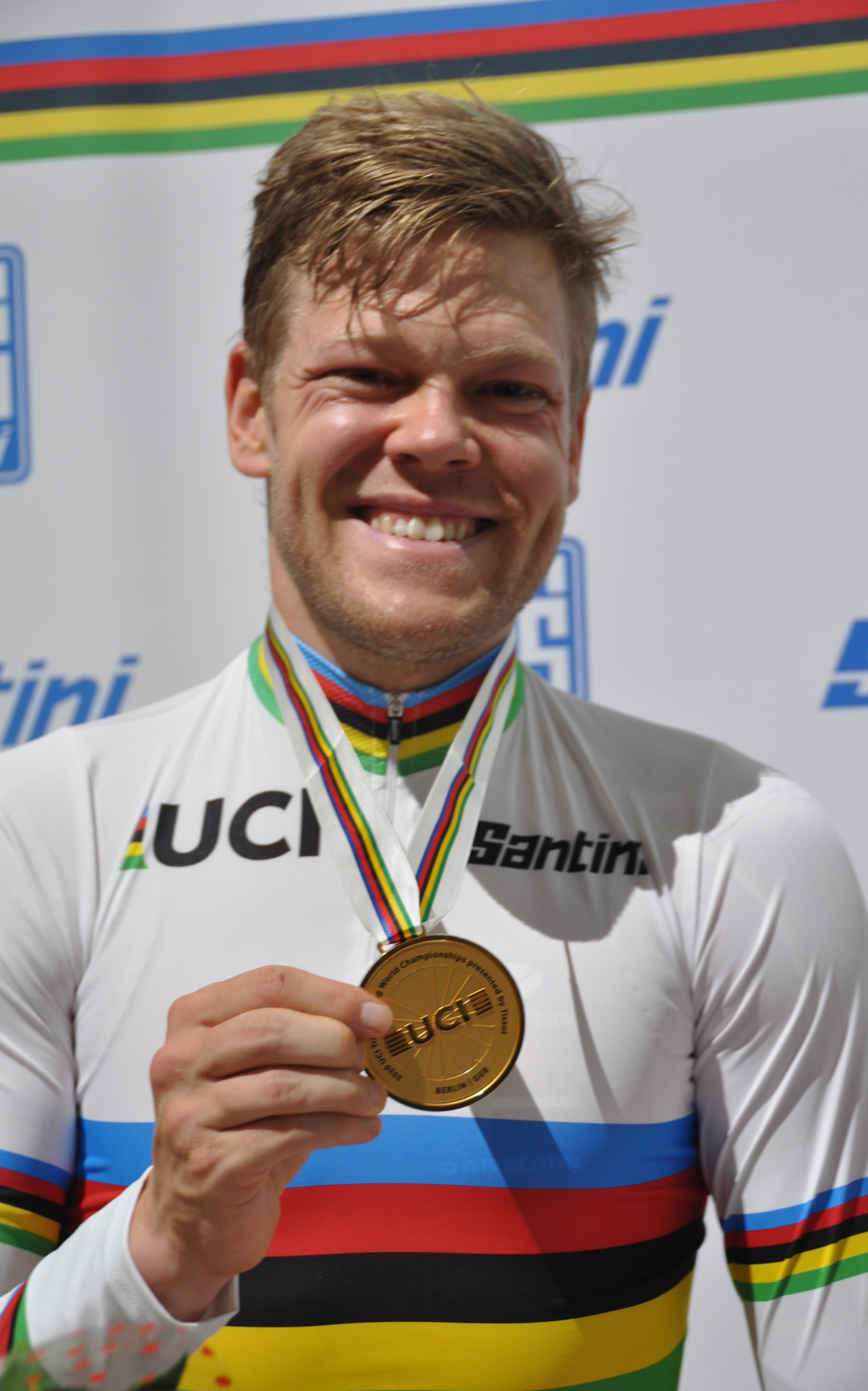
Cyclist Lasse Norman Hansen won in 2012 and 2020

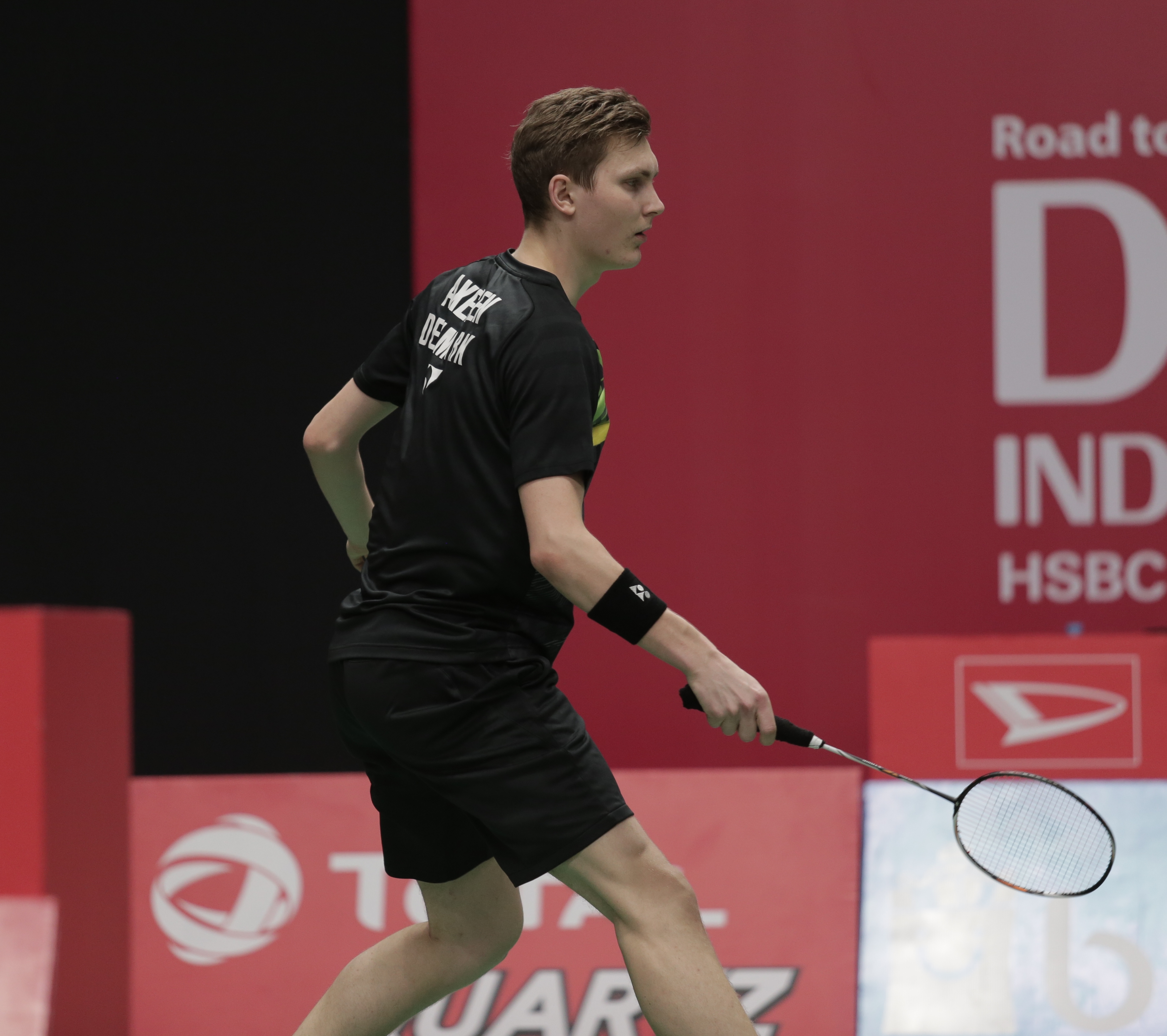
Badminton player Viktor Axelsen won in 2017, 2021 and 2024

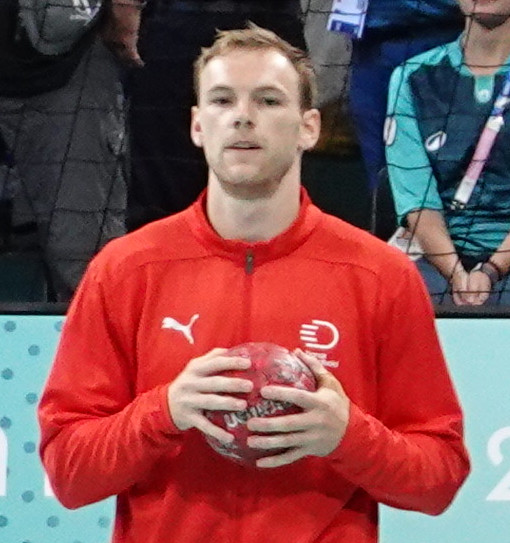
Handball player Mathias Gidsel won in 2025

Year	Winner(s)	Sport	Finalists	Ref.
1991	Mette Jacobsen	Swimming		
1992	Jesper Bank, Jesper Seier and Steen Secher	Sailing	Denmark national football team Arne Nielsson and Christian Frederiksen (canoeing); Vibeke Toft and Allan Tornsberg (dancing); Connie Hansen (wheelchair racing)	
1993	Denmark women's national handball team	Handball		
1994	Denmark women's national handball team (2)	Handball		
1995	Mette Jacobsen (2)	Swimming		
1996	Bjarne Riis	Cycling		
1997	Wilson Kipketer	Athletics		
1998	Eskild Ebbesen, Thomas Ebert, Victor Feddersen and Thomas Poulsen	Rowing		
1999	Camilla Martin	Badminton	Denmark national football team Mette Jacobsen (swimming); Wilson Kipketer (athletics)	
2000	Denmark women's national handball team (3)	Handball		
2001	Thomas Bjørn	Golf	Denmark national football team Tom Kristensen (auto racing)	
2002	Tom Kristensen	Auto racing	Denmark men's national handball team Denmark women's national handball team Wilson Kipketer (athletics); Thor Kristensen and Thomas Ebert (rowing)	
2003	Nicki Pedersen	Speedway		
2004	Eskild Ebbesen (2), Thomas Ebert (2), Thor Kristensen and Stephan Mølvig	Rowing	Denmark women's national handball team Tom Kristensen (auto racing)	
2005	Tom Kristensen (2)	Auto racing	Michael Maze (table tennis); Joachim Olsen (shotput)	
2006	Mikkel Kessler	Boxing	Michael Rasmussen (cycling); Kristina Stokkebroe and Peter Stokkebroe (dancing)	
2007	Mads Rasmussen, Rasmus Quist Hansen	Rowing	Denmark men's national handball team Nicki Pedersen (speedway)	
2008	Denmark men's national handball team	Handball	Denmark men's lightweight coxless four (rowing); Martin Kirketerp and Jonas Warrer (sailing)	
2009	Lotte Friis	Swimming	Michael Maze (table tennis); Caroline Wozniacki (tennis)	
2010	Caroline Wozniacki	Tennis	Matti Breschel (cycling); Lotte Friis (swimming)	
2011	Jeanette Ottesen	Swimming	Denmark men's national handball team Caroline Wozniacki (tennis)	
2012	Lasse Norman Hansen	Cycling	Denmark men's national handball team Mads Rasmussen and Rasmus Quist Hansen (rowing)	
2013	Maja Jager	Archery	Jesper Hansen (skeet shooting); Tom Kristensen (auto racing)	
2014	Camilla Pedersen	Triathlon	Denmark men's lightweight coxless four (rowing); Rikke Møller Pedersen (swimming)	
2015	René Holten Poulsen	Canoe sprint	Maja Alm (orienteering); Jeanette Ottesen (swimming); Anne-Marie Rindom (sailing)	
2016	Pernille Blume	Swimming	Denmark men's national handball team Sara Slott Petersen (athletics)	
2017	Viktor Axelsen	Badminton	Jena Mai Hansen and Katja Salskov-Iversen (sailing); Caroline Wozniacki (tennis)	
2018	Caroline Wozniacki (2)	Tennis	Pernille Harder (association football); Michael Valgren (cycling)	
2019	Mads Pedersen	Cycling	Denmark men's national handball team Anne-Marie Rindom (sailing)	
2020	Danish National Track Cycling Team; Lasse Norman Hansen (2), Julius Johansen, Frederik Rodenberg and Rasmus Pedersen	Track cycling	Viktor Axelsen (badminton); Pernille Harder (association football)	
2021	Viktor Axelsen (2)	Badminton	Anne-Marie Rindom (sailing); Lasse Norman Hansen and Michael Mørkøv (cycling)	
2022	Jonas Vingegaard	Cycling	Viktor Axelsen (badminton); Danish national dressage team (equestrian)	
2023	Denmark men's national handball team (2)	Handball	Viktor Axelsen (badminton); Jonas Vingegaard (cycling)	
2024	Viktor Axelsen (3)	Badminton	Denmark men's national handball team Anne-Marie Rindom (sailing)	
2025	Mathias Gidsel	Handball	Jonas Vingegaard (cycling); Mads Pedersen (cycling)	

=== By number of wins ===
The table below lists the individuals and teams who have won Sports Name of the Year more than once.

No.	Winner	Sport	Years won
3	Denmark women's national handball team	Handball	1993, 1994, 2000
3	Viktor Axelsen	Badminton	2017, 2021, 2024
2	Mette Jacobsen	Swimming	1991, 1995
2	Eskild Ebbesen	Rowing	1998, 2004
2	Thomas Ebert	Rowing	1998, 2004
2	Tom Kristensen	Auto racing	2002, 2005
2	Caroline Wozniacki	Tennis	2010, 2018
2	Lasse Norman Hansen	Cycling	2012, 2020
2	Denmark men's national handball team	Handball	2008, 2023

=== By sport ===
The table below lists the total number of Sports Name of the Year awards won by the winners' sporting profession.

No.	Sport	Years won
6	Handball	1993, 1994, 2000, 2008, 2023, 2025
5	Swimming	1991, 1995, 2009, 2011, 2016
5	Cycling	1996, 2012, 2019, 2020, 2022
4	Badminton	1999, 2017, 2021, 2024
3	Rowing	1998, 2004, 2007
2	Auto racing	2002, 2005
2	Tennis	2010, 2018
1	Sailing	1992
1	Athletics	1997
1	Golf	2001
1	Speedway	2003
1	Boxing	2006
1	Archery	2013
1	Triathlon	2014
1	Canoe sprint	2015

== Sources ==
- Jensen, Jørgen Nørby (4 January 2026). "Årets Sportsnavn" [Sports Name of the Year]. Lex – Danmarks Nationalleksikon (in Danish).
