= Denmark at the 2008 Summer Olympics =

- IOC code: DEN
- NOC: National Olympic Committee and Sports Confederation of Denmark
- Website: www.dif.dk (in Danish and English)

in Beijing
- Competitors: 84 in 16 sports
- Flag bearers: Joachim Olsen (opening); Lotte Friis (closing)
- Medals Ranked 30th: Gold 2 Silver 2 Bronze 3 Total 7

Summer Olympics appearances (overview)
- 1896; 1900; 1904; 1908; 1912; 1920; 1924; 1928; 1932; 1936; 1948; 1952; 1956; 1960; 1964; 1968; 1972; 1976; 1980; 1984; 1988; 1992; 1996; 2000; 2004; 2008; 2012; 2016; 2020; 2024

Other related appearances
- 1906 Intercalated Games

Denmark competed at the 2008 Summer Olympics in Beijing, People's Republic of China. This is a list of all of the Danish athletes who qualified for the Olympics and their results. The goal set out by Team Danmark and the Danish Sports' Union (Dansk Idræts-Forbund, DIF) was seven medals. The distribution of gold, silver and bronze medals in this goal was not specified. Denmark's medal haul at the games was indeed seven, including two golds, two silvers and three bronze.

Team Danmark and DIF believed Denmark had the best chances of winning a medal in wrestling, cycling, handball, the equestrian events, rowing, athletics, badminton and sailing, but hoped to see table tennis and triathlon make the podium as well.

The entire Danish Olympic squad was announced on 21 June 2008 with final confirmation on 8 July.

On 14 August, placing third in the equestrian team dressage event, Denmark won its first medal at the 2008 Summer Olympics.

== Medalists ==
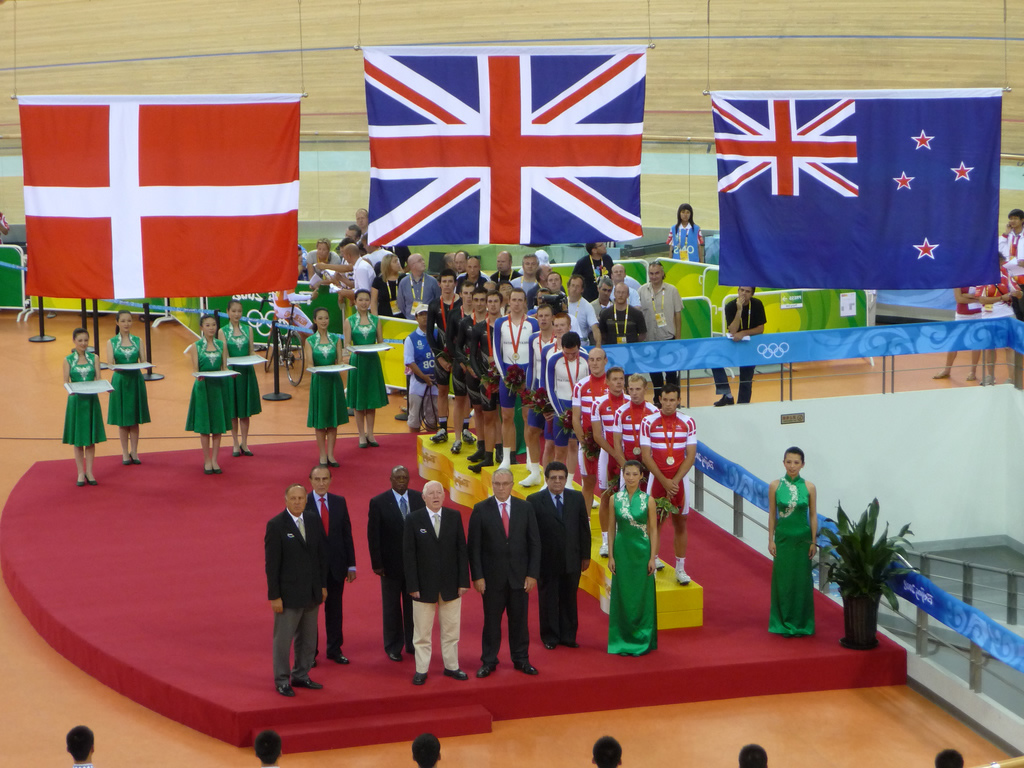
Men's team pursuit at the Laoshan Velodrome

| Medal | Name | Sport | Event |
|---|---|---|---|
| Gold | Mads Andersen; Eskild Ebbesen; Thomas Ebert; Morten Jørgensen | Rowing | Men's lightweight coxless four |
| Gold | Martin Kirketerp; Jonas Warrer | Sailing | 49er class |
| Silver | Casper Jørgensen; Jens-Erik Madsen; Michael Mørkøv; Alex Nicki Rasmussen; Michael Færk Christensen | Cycling | Men's team pursuit |
| Silver | Kim Wraae Knudsen; René Holten Poulsen | Canoeing | Men's K-2 1000 m |
| Bronze | Andreas Helgstrand; Nathalie Zu Sayn-Wittgenstein; Anne Van Olst | Equestrian | Team dressage |
| Bronze | Lotte Friis | Swimming | Women's 800 m freestyle |
| Bronze | Rasmus Quist; Mads Rasmussen | Rowing | Men's lightweight double sculls |

== Archery ==
| Athlete | Event | Ranking round | | Round of 64 | Round of 32 | Round of 16 | Quarterfinals | Semifinals | Final / BM | |
| Athlete | Event | Score | Seed | Opposition Score | Opposition Score | Opposition Score | Opposition Score | Opposition Score | Opposition Score | Rank |
|---|---|---|---|---|---|---|---|---|---|---|
| Niels Dall | Men's individual | 634 | 53 | Galiazzo (ITA) (12); L 97–114 | Did not advance | | | | | |
| Louise Laursen | Women's individual | 605 | 52 | Cwienczek (POL) (13); L 100–113 | Did not advance | | | | | |

== Athletics ==
Key

- Note–Ranks given for track events are within the athlete's heat only
- Q = Qualified for the next round
- q = Qualified for the next round as a fastest loser or, in field events, by position without achieving the qualifying target
- NR = National record
- N/A = Round not applicable for the event
- Bye = Athlete not required to compete in round

Men

| Athlete | Event | Qualification | | Final | |
| Athlete | Event | Distance | Position | Distance | Position |
|---|---|---|---|---|---|
| Morten Jensen | Long jump | 7.63 | 31 | Did not advance | |
| Joachim Olsen | Shot put | 19.74 | 22 | Did not advance | |

Women

| Athlete | Event | Qualification | | Final | |
| Athlete | Event | Distance | Position | Distance | Position |
|---|---|---|---|---|---|
| Christina Scherwin | Javelin throw | 53.95 | 44 | Did not advance | |

== Badminton ==
Men

| Athlete | Event | Round of 64 | Round of 32 | Round of 16 | Quarterfinal | Semifinal | Final / BM | |
| Athlete | Event | Opposition Score | Opposition Score | Opposition Score | Opposition Score | Opposition Score | Opposition Score | Rank |
|---|---|---|---|---|---|---|---|---|
| Peter Gade | Singles | Bye | Lasmari (ALG); W 21–6, 21–4 | Sato (JPN); W 19–21, 22–20, 21–15 | Lin D (CHN); L 13–21, 16–21 | Did not advance | | |
| Kenneth Jonassen | Singles | Bye | Lee H-i (KOR); L 21–15, 14–21, 19–21 | Did not advance | | | | |
| Jens Eriksen; Martin Lundgaard Hansen | Doubles | — | | Cai Y / Fu Hf (CHN); L 12–21, 11–21 | Did not advance | | | |
| Lars Paaske; Jonas Rasmussen | Doubles | — | | Jung J-s / Lee Y-d (KOR); W 21–16, 21–19 | Logosz / Mateusiak (POL); W 17–21, 21–11, 21–15 | Kido / Setiawan (INA); L 19–21, 17–21 | Lee J-j / Hwang J-m (KOR); L 21–13, 18–21, 17–21 | 4 |

Women

| Athlete | Event | Round of 64 | Round of 32 | Round of 16 | Quarterfinal | Semifinal | Final / BM | |
| Athlete | Event | Opposition Score | Opposition Score | Opposition Score | Opposition Score | Opposition Score | Opposition Score | Rank |
|---|---|---|---|---|---|---|---|---|
| Tine Rasmussen | Singles | Bye | Stapušaitytė (LTU); W 21–6, 21–8 | Yulianti (INA); L 21–18, 19–21, 14–21 | Did not advance | | | |
| Lena Frier Kristiansen; Kamilla Rytter Juhl | Doubles | — | | Ogura / Shiota (JPN); L 21–18, 14–21, 18–21 | Did not advance | | | |

Mixed

| Athlete | Event | Round of 16 | Quarterfinal | Semifinal | Final / BM | |
| Athlete | Event | Opposition Score | Opposition Score | Opposition Score | Opposition Score | Rank |
|---|---|---|---|---|---|---|
| Thomas Laybourn; Kamilla Rytter Juhl | Doubles | Saputra / Li (SIN); W 21–12, 21–14 | Limpele / Marissa (INA); L 17–21, 21–15, 17–21 | Did not advance | | |

== Canoeing ==
=== Sprint ===
| Athlete | Event | Heats | | Semifinals | | Final | |
| Athlete | Event | Time | Rank | Time | Rank | Time | Rank |
|---|---|---|---|---|---|---|---|
| Kasper Bleibach | Men's K-1 500 m | 1:42.529 | 5 QS | 1:45.418 | 6 | Did not advance | |
| Kim Wraae Knudsen; René Holten Poulsen | Men's K-2 500 m | 1:30.348 | 5 QS | 1:31.796 | 3 Q | 1:30.569 | 5 |
| Kim Wraae Knudsen; René Holten Poulsen | Men's K-2 1000 m | 3:18.709 | 2 QF | Bye | | 3:13.580 | 2nd place, silver medalist(s) |
| Henriette Engel Hansen | Women's K-1 500 m | 1:52.773 | 5 QS | 1:55.960 | 8 | Did not advance | |

Qualification Legend: QS = Qualify to semi-final; QF = Qualify directly to final

== Cycling ==
=== Road ===
| Athlete | Event | Time | Rank |
|---|---|---|---|
| Chris Anker Sørensen | Men's road race | 6:24:11 | 12 |
| Chris Anker Sørensen | Men's time trial | 1:05:55 | 19 |
| Nicki Sørensen | Men's road race | 6:26:17 | 25 |
| Brian Bach Vandborg | Men's road race | Did not finish | |
| Brian Bach Vandborg | Men's time trial | 1:08:10 | 33 |
| Linda Melanie Villumsen | Women's road race | 3:32:33 | 5 |
| Linda Melanie Villumsen | Women's time trial | 36:50.62 | 13 |

=== Track ===
Pursuit

| Athlete | Event | Qualification | | Semifinals | | Finals | |
| Athlete | Event | Time | Rank | Opponent Results | Rank | Opponent Results | Rank |
|---|---|---|---|---|---|---|---|
| Michael Færk Christensen; Casper Jørgensen; Jens-Erik Madsen; Michael Mørkøv; Alex Rasmussen | Men's team pursuit | 4:02.191 | 4 Q | France; 3:56.831 | 2 Q | Great Britain; 4:00.040 | 2nd place, silver medalist(s) |

Omnium

| Athlete | Event | Points | Laps | Rank |
|---|---|---|---|---|
| Daniel Kreutzfeldt | Men's points race | 29 | 1 | 6 |
| Trine Schmidt | Women's points race | 0 | 0 | 18 |
| Michael Mørkøv; Alex Rasmussen | Men's madison | 14 | −1 | 6 |

=== Mountain biking ===
Men

| Athlete | Event | Time | Rank |
|---|---|---|---|
| Jakob Fuglsang | Men's cross-country | 2:06:41 | 25 |
| Klaus Nielsen | Men's cross-country | LAP (1 lap) | 31 |

=== BMX ===
| Athlete | Event | Seeding | | Quarterfinals | | Semifinals | | Final | |
| Athlete | Event | Result | Rank | Points | Rank | Points | Rank | Result | Rank |
|---|---|---|---|---|---|---|---|---|---|
| Henrik Baltzersen | Men's BMX | 37.635 | 29 | 16 | 5 | Did not advance | | | |
| Amanda Sørensen | Women's BMX | 38.719 | 12 | — | | 20 | 8 | Did not advance | |

== Equestrian ==
=== Dressage ===
| Athlete | Horse | Event | Grand Prix | | Grand Prix Special | | Grand Prix Freestyle | | Overall | |
| Athlete | Horse | Event | Score | Rank | Score | Rank | Score | Rank | Score | Rank |
|---|---|---|---|---|---|---|---|---|---|---|
| Andreas Helgstrand | Don Schufro | Individual | 68.833 | 14 Q | 68.800 | 14 Q | 72.550 | 10 | 70.675 | 11 |
| Nathalie Zu Sayn-Wittgenstein | Digby | Individual | 70.417 | 8 Q | 69.120 | 12 Q | 69.100 | 15 | 69.110 | 15 |
| Anne Van Olst | Clearwater | Individual | 67.375 | 17 Q | 65.320 | 22 | Did not advance | | | |
| Andreas Helgstrand; Nathalie Zu Sayn-Wittgenstein; Anne Van Olst | See above | Team | 68.875 | 3 | — | | | | 68.875 | 3rd place, bronze medalist(s) |

=== Eventing ===
| Athlete | Horse | Event | Dressage | | Cross-country | | | Jumping | | | | | | Total | |
| Athlete | Horse | Event | Dressage | | Cross-country | | | Qualifier | | | Final | | | Total | |
| Athlete | Horse | Event | Penalties | Rank | Penalties | Total | Rank | Penalties | Total | Rank | Penalties | Total | Rank | Penalties | Rank |
|---|---|---|---|---|---|---|---|---|---|---|---|---|---|---|---|
| Peter Tersgov Flarup | Silver Ray | Individual | 53.10 | 45 | 13.20 | 66.30 | 20 | Withdrew | | | | | | | |

== Gymnastics ==
=== Trampoline ===
| Athlete | Event | Qualification | | Final | |
| Athlete | Event | Score | Rank | Score | Rank |
|---|---|---|---|---|---|
| Peter Jensen | Men's | 69.20 | 10 | Did not advance | |

== Handball ==
=== Men's tournament ===
Roster

The following is the Denmark roster in the men's handball tournament of the 2008 Summer Olympics.

Head coach: Ulrik Wilbek

| No. | Pos. | Name | Date of birth (age) | Height | App. | Goals | Club |
|---|---|---|---|---|---|---|---|
| 1 | GK | Kasper Hvidt | 6 February 1976 (aged 32) | 1.92 m | 184 | 1 | (Spain) FC Barcelona Handbol |
| 4 | LB | Lasse Boesen | 18 September 1979 (aged 28) | 1.91 m | 101 | 302 | (Germany) SG Flensburg-Handewitt |
| 6 | RB | Lars Troels Jørgensen | 3 February 1978 (aged 30) | 1.92 m | 158 | 136 | (Spain) SDC San Antonio |
| 7 | CB | Jesper Jensen | 30 October 1977 (aged 30) | 1.88 m | 92 | 192 | (Denmark) Skjern Håndbold |
| 9 | LW | Lars Christiansen | 18 April 1972 (aged 36) | 1.82 m | 266 | 999 | (Germany) SG Flensburg-Handewitt |
| 12 | GK | Peter Henriksen | 20 August 1972 (aged 35) | 1.84 m | 61 | 0 | (Denmark) GOG Svendborg |
| 13 | LB | Bo Spellerberg | 24 July 1979 (aged 29) | 1.92 m | 121 | 173 | (Denmark) KIF Kolding |
| 14 | P | Michael V. Knudsen | 4 September 1978 (aged 29) | 1.92 m | 184 | 615 | (Germany) SG Flensburg-Handewitt |
| 15 | LB | Mikkel Hansen (Note: Replaced Michael V. Knudsen who suffered from appendicitis, and sent home shortly after the first match.) | 22 October 1987 (aged 20) | 1.94 m | 9 | 27 | (Spain) FC Barcelona Handbol |
| 19 | P | Jesper Nøddesbo | 23 October 1980 (aged 27) | 1.99 m | 97 | 186 | (Spain) FC Barcelona Handbol |
| 22 | RB | Kasper Søndergaard | 9 June 1981 (aged 27) | 1.91 m | 40 | 98 | (Denmark) KIF Kolding |
| 23 | CB | Joachim Boldsen | 30 April 1978 (aged 30) | 1.87 m | 176 | 395 | (Spain) FC Barcelona Handbol |
| 24 | RW | Hans Lindberg | 1 August 1981 (aged 27) | 1.88 m | 71 | 160 | (Germany) HSV Hamburg |
| 25 | RB | Klavs Bruun Jørgensen | 3 April 1974 (aged 34) | 1.80 m | 169 | 410 | (Denmark) FCK Handball |
| 26 | LB | Kasper Nielsen | 9 June 1975 (aged 33) | 1.94 m | 120 | 266 | (Germany) SG Flensburg-Handewitt |

Notes

Group play

| Team | Pld | W | D | L | GF | GA | GD | Pts | Qualification |
|---|---|---|---|---|---|---|---|---|---|
| South Korea | 5 | 3 | 0 | 2 | 122 | 129 | −7 | 6 | Qualified for the quarterfinals |
| Denmark | 5 | 2 | 2 | 1 | 137 | 131 | +6 | 6 | Qualified for the quarterfinals |
| Iceland | 5 | 2 | 2 | 1 | 151 | 146 | +5 | 6 | Qualified for the quarterfinals |
| Russia | 5 | 2 | 1 | 2 | 136 | 131 | +5 | 5 | Qualified for the quarterfinals |
| Germany | 5 | 2 | 1 | 2 | 126 | 130 | −4 | 5 | |
| Egypt | 5 | 0 | 2 | 3 | 127 | 132 | −5 | 2 | |

| 10 August 2008; 20:45 | Denmark | 23 – 23 | Egypt | Olympic Sports Centre Gymnasium; Referees: Bord, Buy (FRA) |
| 10 August 2008; 20:45 | Christiansen 6 | (11–10) | El-Ahmar 8 | Olympic Sports Centre Gymnasium; Referees: Bord, Buy (FRA) |
| 10 August 2008; 20:45 | 3× (yellow card) 4× (suspension) 1× (red card) | Report | 4× (yellow card) 4× (suspension) | Olympic Sports Centre Gymnasium; Referees: Bord, Buy (FRA) |

| 12 August 2008; 19:00 | South Korea | 31 – 30 | Denmark | Olympic Sports Centre Gymnasium; Referees: Licis, Stolarovs (LAT) |
| 12 August 2008; 19:00 | Jung Su-young 9 | (13–14) | Nøddesbo 11 | Olympic Sports Centre Gymnasium; Referees: Licis, Stolarovs (LAT) |
| 12 August 2008; 19:00 | 2× (yellow card) 1× (suspension) | Report | 3× (yellow card) 2× (suspension) | Olympic Sports Centre Gymnasium; Referees: Licis, Stolarovs (LAT) |

| 14 August 2008; 19:00 | Denmark | 25 – 24 | Russia | Olympic Sports Centre Gymnasium; Referees: Breto, Huelin (ESP) |
| 14 August 2008; 19:00 | Christiansen 6 | (10–10) | Chernoivanov, Igropulo 6 | Olympic Sports Centre Gymnasium; Referees: Breto, Huelin (ESP) |
| 14 August 2008; 19:00 | 2× (yellow card) 3× (suspension) | Report | 3× (yellow card) 4× (suspension) | Olympic Sports Centre Gymnasium; Referees: Breto, Huelin (ESP) |

| 16 August 2008; 20:45 | Denmark | 32 – 32 | Iceland | Olympic Sports Centre Gymnasium; Referees: Canbro, Claesson (SWE) |
| 16 August 2008; 20:45 | Nøddesbo 6 | (18–17) | Guðjónsson 8 | Olympic Sports Centre Gymnasium; Referees: Canbro, Claesson (SWE) |
| 16 August 2008; 20:45 | 3× (yellow card) 5× (suspension) | Report | 2× (yellow card) 6× (suspension) 1× (red card) | Olympic Sports Centre Gymnasium; Referees: Canbro, Claesson (SWE) |

| 18 August 2008; 19:00 | Germany | 21 – 27 | Denmark | Olympic Sports Centre Gymnasium; Referees: Krstic, Ljubic (SLO) |
| 18 August 2008; 19:00 | Kraus 6 | (12–15) | Boesen 8 | Olympic Sports Centre Gymnasium; Referees: Krstic, Ljubic (SLO) |
| 18 August 2008; 19:00 | 4× (yellow card) 4× (suspension) 1× (red card) | Report | 3× (yellow card) 6× (suspension) | Olympic Sports Centre Gymnasium; Referees: Krstic, Ljubic (SLO) |

Quarterfinal

| 20 August 2008; 18:00 | Denmark | 24 – 26 | Croatia | Olympic Sports Centre Gymnasium; Referees: Breto, Huelin (ESP) |
| 20 August 2008; 18:00 | Christiansen 6 | (14–12) | Šprem 7 | Olympic Sports Centre Gymnasium; Referees: Breto, Huelin (ESP) |
| 20 August 2008; 18:00 | 2× (yellow card) 2× (suspension) | Report | 2× (yellow card) 4× (suspension) | Olympic Sports Centre Gymnasium; Referees: Breto, Huelin (ESP) |

Classification semifinal

| 22 August 2008; 12:00 | Russia | 28 – 27 | Denmark | Beijing National Indoor Stadium; Referees: Elmoamli, Shaban Ali (EGY) |
| 22 August 2008; 12:00 | Dibirov 8 | (17–14) | Christiansen 8 | Beijing National Indoor Stadium; Referees: Elmoamli, Shaban Ali (EGY) |
| 22 August 2008; 12:00 | 4× (yellow card) 2× (suspension) | Report | 4× (yellow card) 5× (suspension) 1× (red card) | Beijing National Indoor Stadium; Referees: Elmoamli, Shaban Ali (EGY) |

7th–8th place

| 24 August 2008; 08:00 | Denmark | 37 – 26 | South Korea | Beijing National Indoor Stadium; Referees: Aires Menezes, Aparecido Pinto (BRA) |
| 24 August 2008; 08:00 | Hansen 8 | (15–13) | Ko Kyung-soo 10 | Beijing National Indoor Stadium; Referees: Aires Menezes, Aparecido Pinto (BRA) |
| 24 August 2008; 08:00 | 3× (yellow card) 4× (suspension) | Report | 2× (yellow card) 1× (suspension) | Beijing National Indoor Stadium; Referees: Aires Menezes, Aparecido Pinto (BRA) |

== Rowing ==
Men

| Athlete | Event | Heats | | Repechage | | Semifinals | | Final | |
| Athlete | Event | Time | Rank | Time | Rank | Time | Rank | Time | Rank |
|---|---|---|---|---|---|---|---|---|---|
| Thomas Morsing Larsen; Morten Ølgaard | Pair | 7:17.43 | 5 R | 6:38.33 | 3 SA/B | 6:48.65 | 6 FB | 6:55.37 | 10 |
| Rasmus Quist Hansen; Mads Rasmussen | Lightweight double sculls | 6:14.84 | 1 SA/B | Bye | | 6:26.49 | 2 FA | 6:12.45 | 3rd place, bronze medalist(s) |
| Mads Andersen; Eskild Ebbesen; Thomas Ebert; Morten Jørgensen | Lightweight four | 5:50.12 | 1 SA/B | Bye | | 6:05.75 | 1 FA | 5:47.76 | 1st place, gold medalist(s) |

Women

| Athlete | Event | Heats | | Repechage | | Semifinals | | Final | |
| Athlete | Event | Time | Rank | Time | Rank | Time | Rank | Time | Rank |
|---|---|---|---|---|---|---|---|---|---|
| Katrin Olsen; Juliane Elander Rasmussen | Lightweight double sculls | 6:58.63 | 2 SA/B | Bye | | 7:06.31 | 4 FB | 7:06.94 | 7 |

Qualification Legend: FA=Final A (medal); FB=Final B (non-medal); FC=Final C (non-medal); FD=Final D (non-medal); FE=Final E (non-medal); FF=Final F (non-medal); SA/B=Semifinals A/B; SC/D=Semifinals C/D; SE/F=Semifinals E/F; QF=Quarterfinals; R=Repechage

== Sailing ==
Men

| Athlete | Event | Race | | | | | | | | | | | Net points | Final rank |
| Athlete | Event | 1 | 2 | 3 | 4 | 5 | 6 | 7 | 8 | 9 | 10 | M* | Net points | Final rank |
|---|---|---|---|---|---|---|---|---|---|---|---|---|---|---|
| Jonas Kældsø Poulsen | RS:X | 28 | 26 | 30 | 29 | ~~35~~ | 4 | 14 | 13 | 34 | 23 | EL | 201 | 24 |
| Anders Nyholm | Laser | 18 | 26 | 19 | 15 | 19 | ~~BFD~~ | 27 | 28 | 13 | CAN | EL | 165 | 23 |

Women

| Athlete | Event | Race | | | | | | | | | | | Net points | Final rank |
| Athlete | Event | 1 | 2 | 3 | 4 | 5 | 6 | 7 | 8 | 9 | 10 | M* | Net points | Final rank |
|---|---|---|---|---|---|---|---|---|---|---|---|---|---|---|
| Bettina Honore | RS:X | 21 | 18 | 21 | 18 | 20 | 9 | 14 | 15 | ~~22~~ | 6 | EL | 142 | 19 |

Open

| Athlete | Event | Race | | | | | | | | | | | | | | | | Net points | Final rank |
| Athlete | Event | 1 | 2 | 3 | 4 | 5 | 6 | 7 | 8 | 9 | 10 | 11 | 12 | 13 | 14 | 15 | M* | Net points | Final rank |
|---|---|---|---|---|---|---|---|---|---|---|---|---|---|---|---|---|---|---|---|
| Jonas Høgh-Christensen | Finn | 16 | 6 | 12 | 16 | ~~25~~ | 4 | 5 | 7 | CAN | CAN | — | | | | | 4 | 70 | 6 |
| Martin Kirketerp; Jonas Warrer | 49er | 2 | 4 | ~~10~~ | 4 | 2 | 3 | 4 | 2 | 9 | 2 | 7 | 8 | CAN | CAN | CAN | 14 | 61 | 1st place, gold medalist(s) |

M = Medal race; EL = Eliminated – did not advance into the medal race; CAN = Race cancelled;

== Shooting ==
Men

| Athlete | Event | Qualification | | Final | |
| Athlete | Event | Points | Rank | Points | Rank |
|---|---|---|---|---|---|
| Anders Golding | Skeet | 112 | 25 | Did not advance | |

== Swimming ==
Men

| Athlete | Event | Heat | | Semifinal | | Final | |
| Athlete | Event | Time | Rank | Time | Rank | Time | Rank |
|---|---|---|---|---|---|---|---|
| Jakob Andkjær | 50 m freestyle | 22.52 | 33 | Did not advance | | | |
| Jakob Andkjær | 100 m freestyle | 49.25 | 27 | Did not advance | | | |
| Jakob Andkjær | 100 m butterfly | 52.24 NR | 19 | Did not advance | | | |
| Chris Christensen | 200 m breaststroke | 2:13.92 | 33 | Did not advance | | | |
| Chris Christensen | 200 m individual medley | 2:02.93 | 32 | Did not advance | | | |
| Mads Glæsner | 400 m freestyle | 3:45.38 NR | 12 | — | | Did not advance | |
| Mads Glæsner | 1500 m freestyle | 15:03.33 NR | 14 | — | | Did not advance | |
| Jon Raahauge Rud | 200 m freestyle | 1:48.96 | 31 | Did not advance | | | |
| Jon Raahauge Rud | 400 m freestyle | 3:57.41 | 34 | — | | Did not advance | |

Women

| Athlete | Event | Heat | | Semifinal | | Final | |
| Athlete | Event | Time | Rank | Time | Rank | Time | Rank |
|---|---|---|---|---|---|---|---|
| Lotte Friis | 400 m freestyle | 4:08.47 NR | 13 | — | | Did not advance | |
| Lotte Friis | 800 m freestyle | 8:21.74 NR | 3 Q | — | | 8:23.03 | 3rd place, bronze medalist(s) |
| Julie Hjorth-Hansen | 200 m individual medley | 2:11.99 NR | 5 Q | 2:12.26 | 10 | Did not advance | |
| Louise Mai Jansen | 200 m freestyle | 2:01.30 | 34 | Did not advance | | | |
| Micha Østergaard | 100 m butterfly | 59.10 | 28 | Did not advance | | | |
| Micha Østergaard | 200 m butterfly | 2:07.77 NR | 8 Q | 2:09.29 | 11 | Did not advance | |
| Jeanette Ottesen | 50 m freestyle | 24.83 NR | 5 Q | 24.86 | 11 | Did not advance | |
| Jeanette Ottesen | 100 m freestyle | 54.04 NR | 9 Q | 54.05 | 7 Q | 54.06 | 5 |
| Jeanette Ottesen | 100 m butterfly | 58.44 | 15 Q | 59.29 | 15 | Did not advance | |
| Lotte Friis; Julie Hjorth-Hansen; Louise Mai Jansen; Micha Østergaard | 4 × 200 m freestyle relay | 8:00.81 NR | 13 | — | | Did not advance | |

== Table tennis ==
| Athlete | Event | Preliminary round | Round 1 | Round 2 | Round 3 | Round 4 | Quarterfinals | Semifinals | Final / BM | |
| Athlete | Event | Opposition Result | Opposition Result | Opposition Result | Opposition Result | Opposition Result | Opposition Result | Opposition Result | Opposition Result | Rank |
|---|---|---|---|---|---|---|---|---|---|---|
| Michael Maze | Men's singles | Bye | | | Primorac (CRO); L 2–4 | Did not advance | | | | |

== Tennis ==
| Athlete | Event | Round of 64 | Round of 32 | Round of 16 | Quarterfinals | Semifinals | Final / BM | |
| Athlete | Event | Opposition Score | Opposition Score | Opposition Score | Opposition Score | Opposition Score | Opposition Score | Rank |
|---|---|---|---|---|---|---|---|---|
| Caroline Wozniacki | Women's singles | Sfar (TUN); W 6–4, 6–1 | Hantuchová (SVK); W 6–1, 6–3 | Dementieva (RUS); L 6–7^{(3–7)}, 2–6 | Did not advance | | | |

== Triathlon ==
| Athlete | Event | Swim (1.5 km) | Trans 1 | Bike (40 km) | Trans 2 | Run (10 km) | Total Time | Rank |
|---|---|---|---|---|---|---|---|---|
| Rasmus Henning | Men's | 18:18 | 0:26 | 58:57 | 0:28 | 31:48 | 1:49:57.47 | 8 |

== Wrestling ==
Key:

- VT – Victory by Fall.
- PP – Decision by Points – the loser with technical points.
- PO – Decision by Points – the loser without technical points.

Men's Greco-Roman

| Athlete | Event | Qualification | Round of 16 | Quarterfinal | Semifinal | Repechage 1 | Repechage 2 | Final / BM | |
| Athlete | Event | Opposition Result | Opposition Result | Opposition Result | Opposition Result | Opposition Result | Opposition Result | Opposition Result | Rank |
|---|---|---|---|---|---|---|---|---|---|
| Anders Nyblom | −55 kg | Bye | Park E-C (KOR); L 1–3 ^{PP} | Did not advance | | | | | 14 |
| Mark Madsen | −74 kg | Samurgashev (RUS); L 1–3 ^{PP} | Did not advance | | | | | | 19 |

== See also ==
- Denmark at the 2008 Summer Paralympics
