= Gold Four =

The Gold Four
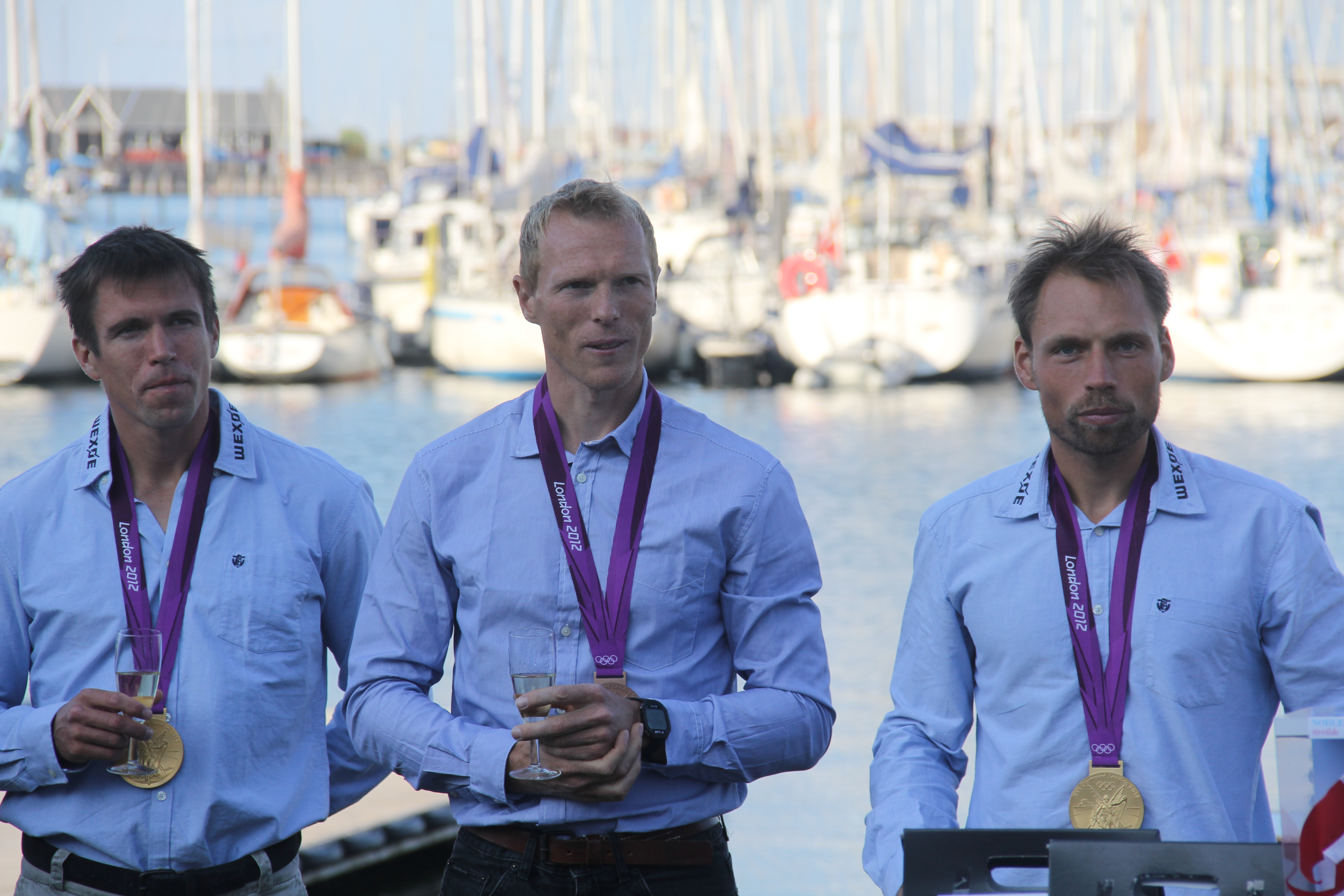
- Rasmussen (left), Ebbesen, and Quist with medals from the 2012 London Olympics

Medal record

Representing Denmark

Men's rowing

Olympic Games
Gold medal – first place	1996 Atlanta	Lightweight coxless four
Bronze medal – third place	2000 Athens	Lightweight coxless four
Gold medal – first place	2004 Sydney	Lightweight coxless four
Gold medal – first place	2008 Beijing	Lightweight coxless four
Bronze medal – third place	2012 London	Lightweight coxless four
Silver medal – second place	2016 Rio de Janeiro	Lightweight coxless four

World Championships
Gold medal – first place	1994 Indianapolis	Lightweight coxless four
Silver medal – second place	1995 Tampere	Lightweight coxless four
Gold medal – first place	1997 Aiguebelette	Lightweight coxless four
Gold medal – first place	1998 Cologne	Lightweight coxless four
Gold medal – first place	1999 St. Catharines	Lightweight coxless four
Silver medal – second place	2001 Lucerne	Lightweight coxless four
Gold medal – first place	2002 Seville	Lightweight coxless four
Gold medal – first place	2003 Milan	Lightweight coxless four
Gold medal – first place	2013 Chungju	Lightweight coxless four
Gold medal – first place	2014 Amsterdam	Lightweight coxless four
Silver medal – second place	2015 Aiguebelette	Lightweight coxless four

The Gold Four (Danish: Guldfireren) is the nickname for a Danish men's lightweight coxless four crew who between 1994 and 2016 has won three Olympic gold, one silver and two bronze, and eight gold and three silver medals at the world championships, making them one of the most successful crews in rowing history. There were 17 team members in total. The boat class was disestablished after the 2017 World Rowing Championships to achieve gender equality in rowing, with the Danish team last competing at the 2016 Olympics.

== History ==
Eskild Ebbesen was the sole constant crew member through the various combinations of crews from the conception of The Gold Four in 1993 to his retirement at the 2012 Olympics (apart from 2009–10 when he had two years off rowing). Other members of medal winning crews include Thomas Poulsen (1993–1999), Victor Feddersen (1993–2000), Niels Henriksen (1993–1996), Thomas Ebert (1996–2008), Søren Madsen (2000–2002), Thor Kristensen (2000–2005), and Mads Andersen (2004–2008). There were 17 team members in total.

Ebbesen's retirement meant the end of a clear lineage through the crews, however his crew mates from the 2012 Olympics have continued the heritage of the famous crew. Ebbesen won the Thomas Keller Medal, the highest honour in rowing, in 2013 after his retirement from the sport at the age of 40.

The 2016 Olympics crew consisted of Kasper Winther Jørgensen (2008–2016), Jacob Barsøe (2011–2016) and 2008 Olympics gold winner Morten Jørgensen (2007–2016), who were all part of the 2012 Olympics bronze winners, as well as newcomer Jacob Larsen (2012–2016). This combination has already won two world championships since 2012. They reached the final of the 2016 Summer Olympics just behind Switzerland who eventually also finished ahead of the Danish crew in the final of the Men's lightweight coxless four.

Ebbesen is quoted as saying about the Gold Four's approach to rowing:

Our strategy, for every race, was always to be first, to be number one from the beginning of the race. A fast start was important. It became natural for us to do a high stroke rate. It then escalated. I don't think we have many strokes under 40.

To achieve gender equality in rowing, FISA suggested early in 2017 to drop the lightweight men's four from the Olympic programme, and the recommendation was adopted by the executive board of the International Olympic Committee in June 2017. After 23 entries to the 2015 World Rowing Championships, this plummeted to just six at the 2017 World Rowing Championships after the demotion of the event, with no Danish crew nominated. Shortly after the 2017 championships, the FISA council voted to remove the lightweight men's four from the world championships with immediate effect.

== Crew members and results ==
There were a total of 17 crew members. The lowest placing of the Gold Four was in 2009, when the team reached ninth place. After the 2004 Summer Olympics, the team took a two-year break and did not start at the World Championships.

	1994	1995	1996	1997	1998	1999	2000	2001	2002	2003	2004	2005	2006	2007	2008	2009	2010	2011	2012	2013	2014	2015	2016
Competition	W	W	O	W	W	W	O	W	W	W	O	W	W	W	O	W	W	W	O	W	W	W	O
result crew member	gold	silver	gold	gold	gold	gold	bronze	silver	gold	gold	gold	DNS	DNS	6	gold	silver	9	5	bronze	gold	gold	silver	silver
Eskild Ebbesen	x	x	x	x	x	x	x	x	x	x	x			x	x			x	x				
Victor Feddersen	x	x	x	x	x	x	x																
Niels Henriksen	x	x	x																				
Thomas Poulsen	x	x	x	x	x	x																	
Thomas Ebert				x	x	x	x	x	x	x	x				x								
Søren Madsen							x	x															
Thor Kristensen								x	x	x	x												
Stephan Mølvig									x	x	x												
Bo Helleberg														x									
Morten Jørgensen														x	x	x		x	x	x	x		x
Mads Andersen														x	x								
Christian Pedersen																x	x						
Jens Vilhelmsen																x	x					x	
Kasper Winther Jørgensen																x	x	x	x	x	x	x	x
Martin Kristensen																	x						
Jacob Barsøe																		x	x	x	x	x	x
Jacob Larsen																				x	x	x	x

Table legend: W=World Championship regatta; O=Olympic regatta; DNS=did not start
