= Will Daly =

Will Daly may refer to:

- Will H. Daly (1869–1924), American labor leader, progressive politician and businessman
- Will Daly (rower) (born 1983), American lightweight rower
