= Razek =

Razek may refer to:

- Edward Razek, American businessperson known for Victoria's Secret Angels
- Abed Razek, a male Muslim given name, and in modern usage, surname.
  - Ghada Abdel Razek, Egyptian actress
  - Mohamed Abdel Razek, Bazoka, Egyptian footballer who plays
  - Samy Abdel Razek, Egyptian sport shooter.
  - Abdel Razek Ibrahim, Egyptian rower
  - Mustafa Abdel-Razek, Egyptian Islamic philosopher
  - Yousra Abdel Razek, Egyptian table tennis player
  - Ali Abdel Raziq aka Ali Abdel-Razek
