= Tian Jun (disambiguation) =

Tian Jun (858–903) was a general and warlord during the late Tang dynasty.

Tian Jun may also refer to:

- Tian Jun (rower) (born 1982), Chinese rower
- James Tien (actor) (born 1942), Hong Kong actor
- Xiao Jun (1907–1988), Chinese author, who used the pseudonym Tian Jun early in his career

== See also ==
- Tianjun County, a county in northern Qinghai, China
