= Rowing at the 2006 Asian Games – Men's lightweight single sculls =

Men's lightweight single sculls at the 2006 Asian Games
- Venue: West Bay Lagoon
- Date: 3–7 December 2006
- Competitors: 16 from 16 nations

Medalists
gold medal	Wu Chongkui	China
silver medal	Daisaku Takeda	Japan
bronze medal	Ruthtanaphol Theppibal	Thailand

The men's lightweight single sculls competition at the 2006 Asian Games in Doha was held from 3 December to 7 December at the West Bay Lagoon.

Since Doha was scarce of water the distance had to be shortened from standard 2000 meters to 1000 meters.

== Schedule ==
All times are Arabia Standard Time (UTC+03:00)

Date	Time	Event
Sunday, 3 December 2006	14:30	Heats
Monday, 4 December 2006	14:10	Repechages
Tuesday, 5 December 2006	14:00	Semifinals
Thursday, 7 December 2006	09:30	Finals

== Results ==
Legend

- DNF — Did not finish

=== Heats ===
- Qualification: 1 → Semifinals A/B (SA/B), 2–4 → Repechages (R)

==== Heat 1 ====
Rank	Athlete	Time	Notes
1	Daisaku Takeda (JPN)	4:16.35	SA/B
2	Wu Chongkui (CHN)	4:21.79	R
3	Phan Thanh Hào (VIE)	4:49.90	R
4	Abdullah Al-Muhanna (KUW)	5:32.47	R

==== Heat 2 ====
Rank	Athlete	Time	Notes
1	Artyom Kudryashov (UZB)	4:29.87	SA/B
2	Nilo Cordova (PHI)	4:43.08	R
3	Mahmoud Piltan (IRI)	4:50.82	R
4	Jabir Al-Kubaisi (QAT)	7:22.37	R

==== Heat 3 ====
Rank	Athlete	Time	Notes
1	Ruthtanaphol Theppibal (THA)	4:18.55	SA/B
2	Pavel Prikhodko (KAZ)	4:21.64	R
3	Hamza Hussein (IRQ)	4:25.88	R
4	Gayan Jayaratne (SRI)	4:47.39	R

==== Heat 4 ====
Rank	Athlete	Time	Notes
1	Anil Kumar Mehrolia (IND)	4:21.68	SA/B
2	Law Hiu Fung (HKG)	4:23.60	R
3	Muhammad Akram (PAK)	4:44.97	R
4	Mun Yong-chol (PRK)	4:55.01	R

=== Repechages ===
- Qualification: 1 → Semifinals A/B (SA/B), 2–3 → Semifinals C/D (SC/D)

==== Repechage 1 ====
Rank	Athlete	Time	Notes
1	Mun Yong-chol (PRK)	3:28.30	SA/B
2	Pavel Prikhodko (KAZ)	3:33.61	SC/D
3	Mahmoud Piltan (IRI)	3:43.51	SC/D

==== Repechage 2 ====
Rank	Athlete	Time	Notes
1	Hamza Hussein (IRQ)	3:24.83	SA/B
2	Law Hiu Fung (HKG)	3:27.48	SC/D
3	Abdullah Al-Muhanna (KUW)	3:55.01	SC/D

==== Repechage 3 ====
Rank	Athlete	Time	Notes
1	Wu Chongkui (CHN)	3:21.56	SA/B
2	Muhammad Akram (PAK)	3:34.78	SC/D
3	Jabir Al-Kubaisi (QAT)	4:55.38	SC/D

==== Repechage 4 ====
Rank	Athlete	Time	Notes
1	Phan Thanh Hào (VIE)	3:26.01	SA/B
2	Nilo Cordova (PHI)	3:28.94	SC/D
3	Gayan Jayaratne (SRI)	3:44.55	SC/D

=== Semifinals ===
- Qualification semifinals C/D: 1–2 → Final C (FC), 3–4 → Final D (FD)
- Qualification semifinals A/B: 1–2 → Final A (FA), 3–4 → Final B (FB)

==== Semifinal C/D 1 ====
Rank	Athlete	Time	Notes
1	Law Hiu Fung (HKG)	3:19.83	FC
2	Nilo Cordova (PHI)	3:27.11	FC
3	Mahmoud Piltan (IRI)	3:36.91	FD
4	Jabir Al-Kubaisi (QAT)	5:00.76	FD

==== Semifinal C/D 2 ====
Rank	Athlete	Time	Notes
1	Pavel Prikhodko (KAZ)	3:24.11	FC
2	Muhammad Akram (PAK)	3:27.09	FC
3	Gayan Jayaratne (SRI)	3:37.68	FD
4	Abdullah Al-Muhanna (KUW)	3:53.50	FD

==== Semifinal A/B 1 ====
Rank	Athlete	Time	Notes
1	Daisaku Takeda (JPN)	3:11.69	FA
2	Wu Chongkui (CHN)	3:16.40	FA
3	Phan Thanh Hào (VIE)	3:20.58	FB
4	Anil Kumar Mehrolia (IND)	3:28.66	FB

==== Semifinal A/B 2 ====
Rank	Athlete	Time	Notes
1	Ruthtanaphol Theppibal (THA)	3:16.90	FA
2	Artyom Kudryashov (UZB)	3:17.83	FA
3	Hamza Hussein (IRQ)	3:20.28	FB
4	Mun Yong-chol (PRK)	3:26.56	FB

=== Finals ===
==== Final D ====
Rank	Athlete	Time
1	Gayan Jayaratne (SRI)	4:04.89
2	Mahmoud Piltan (IRI)	4:09.64
3	Abdullah Al-Muhanna (KUW)	4:18.34
4	Jabir Al-Kubaisi (QAT)	5:55.28

==== Final C ====
Rank	Athlete	Time
1	Pavel Prikhodko (KAZ)	3:56.31
2	Law Hiu Fung (HKG)	4:03.56
3	Muhammad Akram (PAK)	4:06.65
4	Nilo Cordova (PHI)	4:08.56

==== Final B ====
Rank	Athlete	Time
1	Anil Kumar Mehrolia (IND)	3:58.46
2	Phan Thanh Hào (VIE)	3:59.00
3	Hamza Hussein (IRQ)	3:59.39
—	Mun Yong-chol (PRK)	DNF

==== Final A ====
Rank	Athlete	Time
1st place, gold medalist(s)	Wu Chongkui (CHN)	3:37.12
2nd place, silver medalist(s)	Daisaku Takeda (JPN)	3:44.76
3rd place, bronze medalist(s)	Ruthtanaphol Theppibal (THA)	3:47.48
4	Artyom Kudryashov (UZB)	3:49.88
