= Thor Kristensen =

Danish rower (born 1980)

Medal record

Men's rowing

Representing Denmark

Olympic Games
Gold medal – first place	2004 Athens	Lightweight coxless four

Thor Kristensen (born 4 June 1980 in Hadsund, North Denmark Region) was a member of Denmark's rowing team, the Gold Four, during the 2004 Summer Olympics in Athens. Along with Thomas Ebert, Stephan Mølvig, and Eskild Ebbesen, he won the gold medal in the Lightweight Four division.
