= Mads Andersen (rower) =

Danish lightweight rower (born 1978)

Olympic medal record

Men's rowing

Representing Denmark
Gold medal – first place	2008 Beijing	Lightweight coxless four

Mads Christian Kruse Andersen (born 25 March 1978 in Lolland) is a Danish lightweight rower. He won a gold medal at the 2008 Summer Olympics in the lightweight coxless four event together with Thomas Ebert, Eskild Ebbesen, and Morten Jørgensen, making up the Gold Four.
