= Richard Coakley =

Irish rower

Personal information
- Nationality: Irish
- Born: 30 May 1983 (age 41); Cork, Ireland

Sport
- Sport: Rowing

Richard Coakley (born 30 May 1983) is an Irish rower. He competed in the men's lightweight coxless four event at the 2008 Summer Olympics.
