= Eskild Ebbesen =

Danish lightweight rower (born 1972)

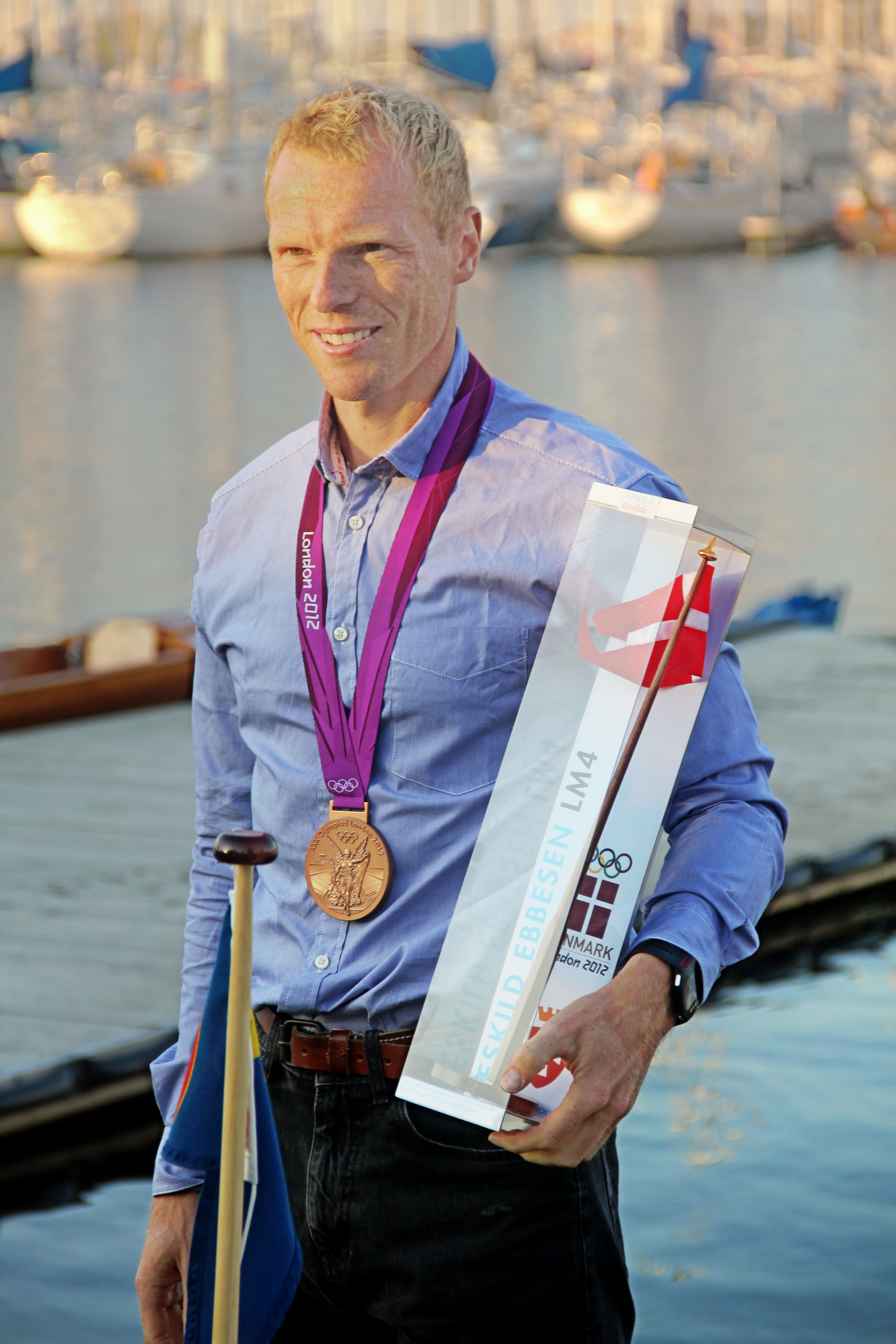
- Ebbesen in 2012

Personal information
- Born: Eskild Balschmidt Ebbesen; 27 May 1972 (age 54) Silkeborg, Midtjylland

Sport
- Sport: Rowing
Medal record
Men's rowing
Representing Denmark
Olympic Games
Gold medal – first place	1996 Atlanta	Lightweight coxless four
Gold medal – first place	2004 Athens	Lightweight coxless four
Gold medal – first place	2008 Beijing	Lightweight coxless four
Bronze medal – third place	2000 Sydney	Lightweight coxless four
Bronze medal – third place	2012 London	Lightweight coxless four

Eskild Balschmidt Ebbesen (born 27 May 1972) is a Danish lightweight rower, who as part of the Gold Four has won a total number of five Olympic medals (three gold) and six World Championship gold medals.

Ebbesen was the flag bearer of the Danish team at the opening ceremony of the 2004 Summer Olympics in Athens, Greece.

Ebbesen and his crew took an alternative approach to racing and is quoted saying:

Our strategy, for every race, was always to be first, to be number one from the beginning of the race. A fast start was important. It became natural for us to do a high stroke rate. It then escalated. I don't think we have many strokes under 40.

Ebbesen retired from competitive rowing at the age of 40 after the 2012 London Olympics. In the following year, he won the Thomas Keller Medal, the highest honour in rowing.

== See also ==
- List of multiple Olympic gold medalists in one event
- List of multiple Olympic medalists in one event

Awards and achievements
Preceded by Wilson Kipketer; Nicki Pedersen	Danish Sports Name of the Year; 1998 (with Ebert, Feddersen, Poulsen); 2004 (with Ebert, Kristensen, Mølvig)	Succeeded by Camilla Martin; Tom Kristensen
Preceded by Václav Chalupa	Thomas Keller Medal; 2013	Succeeded by Drew Ginn
