= Mike Altman =

American rower (born 1975)

Personal information
- Born: Michael Altman; August 21, 1975 (age 50)
- Height: 6’0”
- Weight: 155 lb (70 kg)

Sport
- Sport: Rowing
Medal record
Men's rowing
Representing United States
World Rowing Championships
Gold medal – first place	2008 Ottensheim	Lwt eight

Michael Altman (born August 21, 1975) is an American lightweight rower. He won a gold medal at the July 2008 World Rowing Championships in Ottensheim with the lightweight men's eight. At the August 2008 Summer Olympics, he came eleventh with the lightweight coxless four.

Altman received his undergraduate degree at the Walsh School of Foreign Service after graduating from Redwood High School. He went on to earn his MBA at UCLA.
