= Morten Jørgensen =

Danish rower (born 1985)

Medal record

Men's rowing

Representing Denmark

Olympic Games
Gold medal – first place	2008 Beijing	LM4−
Silver medal – second place	2016 Rio de Janeiro	LM4−
Bronze medal – third place	2012 London	LM4−

World Championships
Gold medal – first place	2013 Chungju	LM4−
Gold medal – first place	2014 Amsterdam	LM4−

European Championships
Gold medal – first place	2014 Belgrade	LM4−

Morten Jørgensen (born 23 June 1985 in Næstved, Denmark) is a Danish former lightweight rower. He won a gold medal at the 2008 Summer Olympics in Lightweight coxless fours together with Thomas Ebert, Eskild Ebbesen, and Mads Andersen.

Morten Jørgensen was a substitute for the crew, the Gold Four, going into the 2008 Summer Olympics. One and a half months before the event he substituted for Bo Helleberg who was injured. In the initial heat, the Danish boat broke the Olympic record, only to beat it again in the semifinal. The Danish team went on to win the gold medal, beating the Polish beat by more than 1.5 seconds. The year after he won World Championship silver medals with the same boat.

Four years later at the 2012 Summer Olympics, Jørgensen was again part of the Danish lightweight men's four team, together with Kasper Winther Jørgensen, Jacob Barsøe and the Veteran Eskild Ebbesen, but this time they could only finish third, winning the bronze medal behind South Africa and Great Britain.

The following two years he was two times European Champion and two times world champion. In 2015 he was injured, but made a comeback in 2016 and participated in third Olympics in 2016 in Rio de Janeiro. The team this time was Kasper Winther Jørgensen, Jacob Barsøe og Jacob Larsen, with whom he won silver medals behind Switzerland.

He retired from elite rowing after the 2016 Olympics.
