= Mohamed Zidan (rower) =

Egyptian rower

Personal information
- Nationality: Egyptian
- Born: 19 September 1978 (age 46)

Sport
- Sport: Rowing

Mohamed Zidan (born 19 September 1978) is an Egyptian rower. He competed in the men's lightweight coxless four event at the 2008 Summer Olympics.
