= Liam Parsons =

Canadian rower (born 1977)

Personal information
- Born: June 27, 1977 (age 48) Thunder Bay, Ontario, Canada

Sport
- Sport: Rowing
- College team: University of Western Ontario
- Club: Thunder Bay Rowing Club
Medal record
Men's rowing
Representing Canada
2008 Summer Olympic Games
Bronze medal – third place	2008 Beijing	Men's Lightweight Fours

Daniel Liam Parsons (born June 27, 1977) is a Canadian rower. He was born in Thunder Bay, Ontario.

Parsons won a bronze in the men's lightweight fours at the 2008 Summer Olympics with Iain Brambell, Mike Lewis and Jon Beare.
