= Ahmed Gad =

Egyptian rower

Personal information
- Nationality: Egyptian
- Born: 23 July 1978 (age 46); Cairo, Egypt

Sport
- Sport: Rowing

Ahmed Gad (born 23 July 1978) is an Egyptian rower. He competed in the men's lightweight coxless four event at the 2008 Summer Olympics.
