= Paweł Rańda =

Polish rower (born 1979)

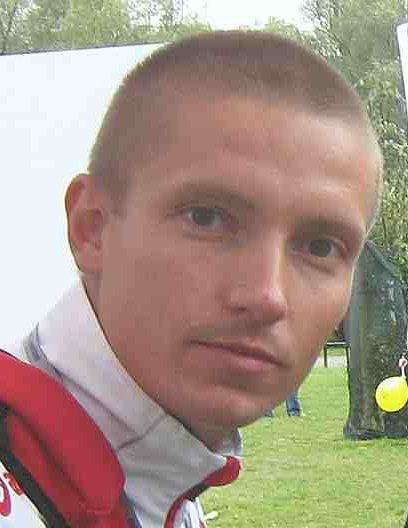

Medal record

Representing Poland

Men's rowing

Olympic Games
| Silver medal – second place | 2008 Beijing | Lwt coxless four |

World Rowing Championships
| Bronze medal – third place | 2009 Poznan | Lwt coxless four |

European Championships
| Silver medal – second place | 2010 Montemor-o-Velho | Lwt coxless four |

Paweł Rafał Rańda (born 20 March 1979 in Wrocław) is a Polish rower. He won a silver medal in lightweight coxless four at the 2008 Summer Olympics.

For his sport achievements, he received:
Golden Cross of Merit in 2008.
