= Paul Mattick (rower) =

British rower (born 1978)

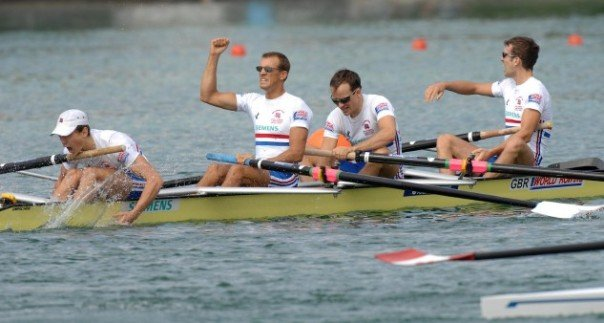
- Paul Mattick (2nd from left) wins gold at the 2007 World Rowing Championships in Munich, Germany

Personal information
- Nationality: British
- Born: Paul Anthony Mattick; 25 May 1978 (age 48) Bath, Somerset, England
- Height: 186 cm – 6 ft / 1 in
- Weight: 72 kg (159 lb) – 158 Lbs

Sport
- Country: Great Britain
- Sport: Rowing
- Event: Lightweight Coxless four
- College team: Oxford University Lightweight Rowing Club
- Club: Leander Club
Medal record
Men's rowing
Representing Great Britain
World Rowing Championships
Gold medal – first place	2007 Munich	LM4-
Gold medal – first place	2010 Karapiro	LM4-
Bronze medal – third place	2011 Lake Bled	LM4-
World Rowing Cup
Gold medal – first place	2007 Lucerne	LM4-
Gold medal – first place	2010 Munich	LM4-
Gold medal – first place	2010 Lucerne	LM4-
Gold medal – first place	2011 Lucerne	LM4-
Gold medal – first place	2012 Belgrade	LM2-
Gold medal – first place	2012 Munich	LM2-
Silver medal – second place	2007 Amsterdam	LM4-
Silver medal – second place	2008 Munich	LM4-
Silver medal – second place	2010 Lake Bled	LM4-
Bronze medal – third place	2005 Munich	LM2-
Bronze medal – third place	2007 Linz	LM4-
Bronze medal – third place	2011 Munich	LM4-
Bronze medal – third place	2012 Lucerne	LM4-

Paul Mattick (born 25 April 1978, in Bath) is a British rower who competed at the 2008 Summer Olympics.

== Rowing career ==
Mattick competed in the men's lightweight coxless four at the 2008 Olympic Games and studied at Hertford College, Oxford.

He was part of the British squad that topped the medal table at the 2011 World Rowing Championships in Bled, where he won a bronze medal as part of the lightweight coxless four with Richard Chambers, Chris Bartley and Rob Williams.
