= Mike Lewis (rower) =

Canadian rower

Personal information
- Full name: Michael Peter Lewis
- Nickname: Power Stick
- Nationality: Canadian
- Born: April 15, 1981 (age 45) Victoria, British Columbia, Canada

Sport
- Club: University of Victoria
Medal record
Men's Rowing
Representing Canada
Olympic Games
Bronze medal – third place	2008 Beijing	Lightweight fours
Pan American Games
Silver medal – second place	2003 Santo Domingo	Lightweight fours
Silver medal – second place	2003 Santo Domingo	Eights

Michael "Mike" Peter Lewis (born April 15, 1981) is a Canadian rower and a Chemistry teacher. He was born in Victoria, British Columbia.

Lewis won a bronze in the men's lightweight fours at the 2008 Summer Olympics with Iain Brambell, Liam Parsons and Jon Beare.

Lewis taught at GW Graham Secondary in Chilliwack for one semester from September 2017 to February 2018. He is currently teaching at Sardis Secondary.
