= Bo Helleberg =

Danish rower

Personal information
- Born: Bo Brask Helleberg; 24 June 1974 (age 52)

Sport
- Sport: Rowing
Medal record
Men's rowing
Representing Denmark
World Rowing Championships
Gold medal – first place	1996 Motherwell	Lwt coxless pair
Gold medal – first place	2003 Milan	Lwt coxless pair
Gold medal – first place	2004 Banyoles	Lwt coxless pair
Gold medal – first place	2005 Kaizu, Gifu	Lwt coxless pair
Silver medal – second place	1995 Tampere	Lwt coxless pair

Bo Brask Helleberg (born 24 June 1974) is a Danish lightweight rower. He won a gold medal at the 1996 World Rowing Championships in Motherwell with the lightweight men's coxless pair. Helleberg was nominated for the 2008 Summer Olympics, but had to withdraw due to injury and was replaced by Morten Jørgensen.
