= Amin Ramadan =

Egyptian rower

Personal information
- Nationality: Egyptian
- Born: 1 January 1981 (age 44)

Sport
- Sport: Rowing

Amin Ramadan (Arabic: امين رمضان, born 1 January 1981) is an Egyptian rower. He competed in the men's lightweight coxless four event at the 2008 Summer Olympics.
