= Tom Paradiso =

American rower (born 1979)

Personal information
- Full name: Thomas Paradiso
- Born: December 7, 1979 (age 46) Abington, Pennsylvania, U.S.
- Education: University of Pennsylvania, 2002
- Years active: 2001-2012
- Height: 6 ft 1 in (185 cm)
- Weight: 152 lb (69 kg)

Sport
- Sport: Rowing
- Club: New York Athletic Club, College Boat Club
Medal record
Men's Rowing
Representing United States
World Championships
Gold medal – first place	2008 Ottensheim	Lwt eight
Silver medal – second place	2003 Milan	Lwt eight
Bronze medal – third place	2001 Lucerne	Lwt eight
Bronze medal – third place	2002 Seville	Lwt eight

Thomas Paradiso (born December 7, 1979) is an American Olympian in lightweight rowing.

== Rowing career ==
Tom began rowing at Chestnut Hill Academy in Philadelphia in 1995 and was a member of the National Champion Youth 4x in 1998. Tom continued his education and rowing career as a member of the Heavyweight Mens Team at the University of Pennsylvania, graduating in 2002. Tom first competed at the World Championships in 2001 in Lucerne, Switzerland in the Lightweight 8+, winning a Bronze Medal. From 2001 to 2012, Tom competed at the World Championships eight times and made two Pan American Games Teams, competing as a lightweight and heavyweight, rowing port and starboard, in sweep rowing and as a sculler.

== Olympics ==
2008 was a rowing career high-point for Tom when he won a gold medal at the July 2008 World Rowing Championships in Ottensheim with the lightweight men's eight. At the August 2008 Summer Olympics, he came eleventh with the lightweight coxless four.
