= Iain Brambell =

Canadian rower

Personal information
- Nationality: Canadian
- Born: November 10, 1973 (age 52) Brentwood Bay, British Columbia, Canada
- Spouse: Laryssa Biesenthal

Sport
- Sport: Rowing
- Club: Victoria City Rowing Club
Medal record
Men's rowing
Representing Canada
Olympic Games
Bronze medal – third place	2008 Beijing	Lightweight coxless four
World Championships
Bronze medal – third place	2002 Seville	Lightweight coxless four

Iain Brambell (born November 10, 1973) is a Canadian Olympic rower. Born and raised in Brentwood Bay, British Columbia, he competed at the Summer Olympics in Sydney in 2000, Athens in 2004, and Beijing in 2008, each time in the men's lightweight coxless four. He is a graduate of Brock University and The University of Western Ontario. He is married to Olympic rower Laryssa Biesenthal.

He won a bronze medal at the 2002 World Rowing Championships in the men's lightweight coxless four.

At the 2008 Summer Olympics, he won a bronze medal in the men's lightweight coxless four with Mike Lewis, Liam Parsons, and Jon Beare.

Brambell has successfully transitioned from being a high-performance athlete to a high-performance sport administrator. He has held high-performance advisory roles within the Australian Sport Commission & Own The Podium, and High Performance Director roles with Rowing Canada Aviron and Australian Sailing.
