= Bartłomiej Pawełczak =

Polish rower (born 1982)

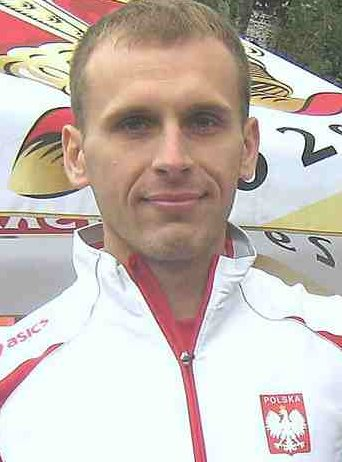
- Pawełczak in 2008

Personal information
- Born: 7 June 1982 (age 44) Więcbork, Poland
- Height: 182 cm (6 ft 0 in)
- Weight: 72 kg (159 lb)
Medal record
Men's rowing
Representing Poland
Olympic Games
Silver medal – second place	2008 Beijing	Lwt coxless four

Bartłomiej Pawełczak (born 7 June 1982, in Więcbork) is a Polish rower. He won a silver medal in lightweight coxless four at the 2008 Summer Olympics.

For his sport achievements, he received:
Golden Cross of Merit in 2008.
