= Pat Todd (rower) =

American rower (born 1979)

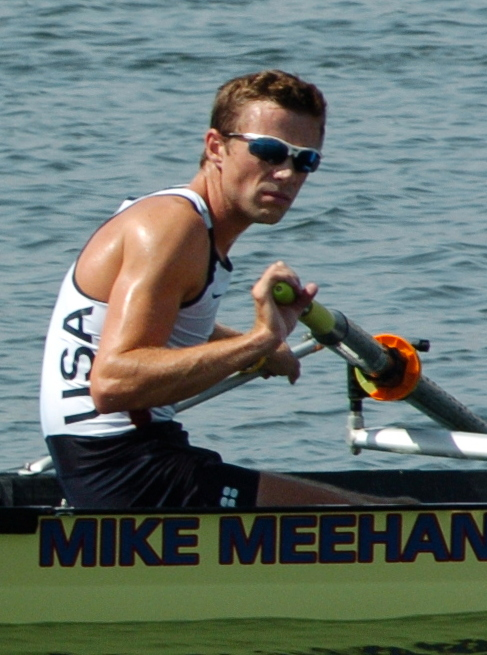
- Todd at the 2004 Olympics

Personal information
- Full name: Patrick Todd
- Born: November 14, 1979 (age 46) Danbury, Connecticut, U.S.
- Height: 180 cm (5 ft 11 in)
- Weight: 72 kg (159 lb)

Sport
- Country: United States
- Sport: Rowing
- Club: Princeton Training Centre; Cincinnati RC
Medal record
Representing United States
World Rowing Championships
Silver medal – second place	2003 Milan	LM8+
Gold medal – first place	2008 Linz	LM8+

Patrick Todd (born November 14, 1979) is a retired American rower. He competed in the lightweight coxless fours at the 2004 and 2008 Olympics and placed 9th and 11th, respectively. Todd won a gold and a silver medal in the lightweight eights at the world championships in 2003 and 2008.

Todd is a 1998 graduate of St. Xavier High School in Cincinnati and a 2002 graduate of Harvard College.
