= Cathal Moynihan =

Irish rower

Personal information
- Nationality: Irish
- Born: 14 February 1981 (age 44); County Kerry, Ireland

Sport
- Sport: Rowing

Cathal Moynihan (born 14 February 1981) is an Irish rower. He competed in the men's lightweight coxless four event at the 2008 Summer Olympics.
