= Łukasz Pawłowski =

Polish rower

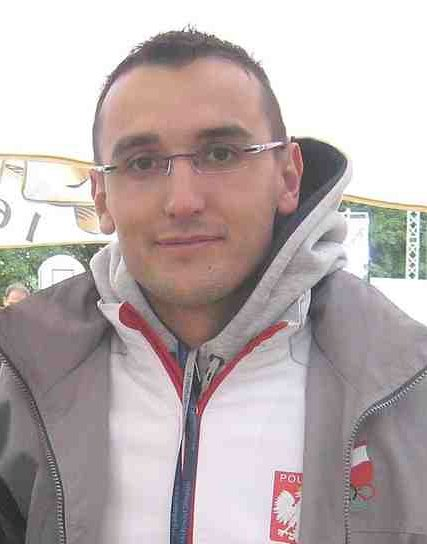

Medal record

Men's rowing

Representing Poland

Olympic Games
Silver medal – second place	2008 Beijing	Lwt coxless four

World Rowing Championships
Bronze medal – third place	2006 Eton	Lwt eight
Bronze medal – third place	2009 Poznan	Lwt coxless four

European Championships
Silver medal – second place	2010 Montemor-o-Velho	Lwt coxless four

Łukasz Zygmunt Pawłowski (born 11 June 1983 in Toruń) is a Polish rower. He won a silver medal in lightweight coxless four at the 2008 Summer Olympics.

== Medals ==
For his sport achievements, he received:
Golden Cross of Merit in 2008.
Nominated to "2008 Toruń Citizen of the Year" Gazeta Wyborcza.
