= Jon Beare =

Canadian rower (1974–2023)

Personal information
- Born: May 10, 1974 Toronto, Ontario, Canada
- Died: October 5, 2023 (aged 49)

Sport
- Sport: Rowing
Medal record
Men's rowing
Representing Canada
Olympic Games
Bronze medal – third place	2008 Beijing	Lightweight Fours
World Rowing Championships
Bronze medal – third place	1996 Strathclyde	LM8+
Bronze medal – third place	1997 Aiguebelette	LM8+

Jon Beare (May 10, 1974 – October 5, 2023) was a Canadian rower. Born in Toronto, Ontario, he started rowing in 1988 and was a graduate of the University of Western Ontario. In 1993, he participated in the Canada Games in Kamloops B.C. as a member of the Ontario Team. The team returned with a gold in the four, and a silver in the eight. The following year as a member of the National Team he won a bronze in the Men's Lightweight 8 at the 1994 Commonwealth Regatta in London, Ontario. He lived with his family in Shawnigan Lake, British Columbia, near Greater Victoria.

Beare competed in the Olympics three times (2000, 2004 and 2008), and won a bronze in the men's lightweight fours at the 2008 Summer Olympics with Iain Brambell, Liam Parsons and Mike Lewis.

Beare died on October 5, 2023, at the age of 49.
