= Miłosz Bernatajtys =

Polish rower (born 1982)

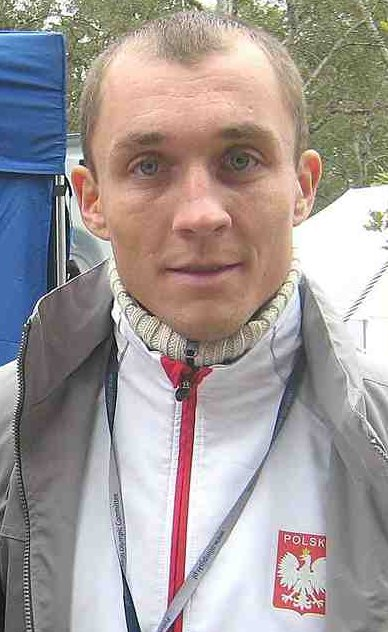

Medal record

Representing Poland

Men's rowing

Olympic Games
Silver medal – second place	2008 Beijing	Lightweight coxless four

World Rowing Championships
Bronze medal – third place	2009 Poznan	Lightweight coxless four

European Championships
Silver medal – second place	2010 Montemor-o-Velho	Lightweight coxless four

Miłosz Bernatajtys (born 30 May 1982 in Słupsk) is a Polish rower. He won a silver medal in lightweight coxless four at the 2008 Summer Olympics.

For his sport achievements, he received:
Golden Cross of Merit in 2008.
