= Thomas Poulsen =

Danish rower

Medal record

Men's rowing

Representing Denmark

Olympic Games
Gold medal – first place	1996 Atlanta	Lwt coxless four

Thomas Poulsen (born 16 February 1970 in Hørsholm, Denmark) is a Danish competition rower, Olympic champion and world record holder.

Poulsen won a gold medal in lightweight coxless four at the 1996 Summer Olympics as part of the Gold Four. He was member of the team that set a world record in 1999, with the time 5:45.60 (for 2000 metres).

He represented the club Danske Studenters roklub.

He was named Danish Sports Name of the Year in 1998.
