= Abdel Razek Ibrahim =

Egyptian rower

Personal information
- Nationality: Egyptian
- Born: 1 May 1983 (age 41); Giza, Egypt

Sport
- Sport: Rowing

Abdel Razek Ibrahim (born 1 May 1983) is an Egyptian rower. He competed in the men's lightweight coxless four event at the 2008 Summer Olympics.
