= Paul Griffin (rower) =

Irish rower (born 1979)

Medal record

Men's rowing

Representing Ireland

World Rowing Championships
Silver medal – second place	2005 Gifu	LM4-
Bronze medal – third place	2006 Eton	LM4-

Paul Griffin (born 1 September 1979 in Tralee) is an Irish rower. He finished 6th in the men's lightweight coxless four at the 2004 Summer Olympics and 10th in the men's lightweight coxless four at the 2008 Summer Olympics. He qualified for the 15 km Cross-country Skiing event at the 2010 Winter Olympics but he was not selected because another higher ranked skier was selected ahead of him.
