= Will Daly (rower) =

American rower (born 1983)

Personal information
- Born: William Daly; August 2, 1983 (age 42)

Sport
- Sport: Rowing
Medal record
Men's rowing
Representing United States
World Rowing Championships
Gold medal – first place	2008 Ottensheim	Lwt eight

William Daly (born August 2, 1983) is an American lightweight rower. He won a gold medal at the July 2008 World Rowing Championships in Ottensheim with the lightweight men's eight. At the August 2008 Summer Olympics, he came eleventh with the lightweight coxless four.

Daly graduated from Kent School in 2008.
