= James Clarke (rower) =

British lightweight rower

Personal information
- Born: 31 December 1984 (age 41)

Sport
- Sport: Rowing
Medal record
Men's rowing
Representing Great Britain
World Rowing Championships
Gold medal – first place	2007 Munich	Lwt men's four
Silver medal – second place	2010 Karapiro	Men's eight

James Clarke (born 31 December 1984) is a British lightweight rower. He learned to row at St Paul's School, London and went on to row for Durham University, under the tutelage of Wade Hall-Craggs. Clarke was a member of St Cuthbert's Society and graduated in 2006. He won a gold medal at the 2007 World Rowing Championships in Munich with the lightweight men's four. He competed at the Beijing Olympics in 2008, coming 5th. Following the 2008 season he changed weight categories, switching to compete in the open weight category. He gained selection for the GB men's heavyweight squad, competing in the men's eight in 2009, finishing 5th and then in 2010 winning a silver medal at the Karapiro World Championships in New Zealand.

== See also ==
- Richard Chamber
- Will Fletcher
