= Bastian Seibt =

German rower

Medal record

Men's rowing

Representing Germany

World Rowing Championships
Gold medal – first place	2003 Milan	LM8+
Gold medal – first place	2010 Karapiro	LM8+
Gold medal – first place	2012 Plovdiv	LM8+
Bronze medal – third place	2011 Lake Bled	LM2-

Bastian Seibt (born 19 March 1978 in Hamburg) is a former German rower. In 2003 and 2010 he won the World Rowing Championships in the men's lightweight eight. He represented his native country at the 2008 Summer Olympics in Beijing, China and at the 2012 Summer Olympics.

== Club ==
In 2008 Seibt rowed for Der Hamburger und Germania Ruder Club in his hometown Hamburg.
