= Zhang Lin (rower) =

Chinese rower

Zhang Lin (born 6 March 1983 in Fuxin, Liaoning) is a male Chinese rower, who competed for Team China at the 2008 Summer Olympics.

== Major performances ==
- 2005 National Games – 1st lightweight fours;
- 2006/2007 World Championships – 1st/5th lightweight fours;
- 2007 World Cup Leg 1/2 – 1st lightweight fours;
- 2008 World Cup Leg 1 – 1st lightweight fours
