= Fabien Tilliet =

French rower

Medal record

Men's rowing

Representing France

World Championships
Gold medal – first place	2004 Banyoles	LM8+
Gold medal – first place	2005 Gifu	LM4-
Gold medal – first place	2009 Poznań	LM2-
Gold medal – first place	2010 Karapiro	LM2-
Silver medal – second place	2006 Eton	LM4-
Silver medal – second place	2007 Munich	LM4-
Bronze medal – third place	2012 Plovdiv	LM2-

Fabien Tilliet (born 3 March 1980 in Annecy) is a French rower. He competed for France at the 2008 Summer Olympics and won medals at seven World Rowing Championships from 2004 through 2012.
