= James Lindsay-Fynn =

British rower (born 1975)

Medal record

Men's rowing

Representing Great Britain

World Rowing Championships
Gold medal – first place	2007 Munich	LM4-
Bronze medal – third place	1999 St. Catharines	LM4x

James Lindsay-Fynn (born 29 September 1975 in Dublin) is a British rower.
