= Jiri Vlcek =

Italian rower

Personal information
- Nationality: Italian
- Born: 27 May 1978 (age 48) Mladá Boleslav, Czechoslovakia

Sport
- Country: Italy
- Sport: Rowing
- Club: Fiamme Oro
Medal record
Gold medal – first place	2005 Gifu	LM8+
Gold medal – first place	2006 Eton	LM8+
Gold medal – first place	2009 Poznań	LM8+
Silver medal – second place	2011 Bled	LM8+
Silver medal – second place	2012 Plovdiv	LM8+
Silver medal – second place	2014 Amsterdam	LM8+
Bronze medal – third place	2007 Munich	LM4-
European Championships
Gold medal – first place	2007 Poznań	Lwt coxless four

Jiri Vlcek (Czech: Jiří Vlček (born 27 May 1978) is a Czech-born Italian rower.
