= Team Denmark =

Team Danmark is an organization funded by the Danish government through the proceeds from Danske Spil, the state-controlled organization for betting on sports in Denmark, with the purpose of promoting elite sports in Denmark.
