= Gearoid Towey =

Irish rower

Medal record

Men's rowing

Representing Ireland

World Championships
Gold medal – first place	2001 Lucerne	LM2-
Bronze medal – third place	1999 St. Catharines	LM4x
Bronze medal – third place	2003 Milan	LM2x
Bronze medal – third place	2006 Eton	LM4-

U23 World Championships
Gold medal – first place	1996 Hazewinkel	BLM1x

Gearoid Towey (born 26 March 1977 in Fermoy, Ireland) is an Irish Olympic athlete, former world champion in rowing, and trans-Atlantic rower. He competed at three Olympics – Sydney 2000, Athens 2004 and Beijing 2008.

Towey, along with Ciaran Lewis, attempted to cross the Atlantic Ocean in 2005 in a 23 ft rowing boat. After 40 days at sea, having endured two tropical storms and a hurricane on the way, their boat was pitch poled by a 10-meter wave, leaving the men adrift 900 miles from landfall. They were rescued in the middle of a force 9 storm at night by the supertanker "Hispania Spirit".

Towey organised the first official Art O'Neill Challenge in 2009, to raise money for the Stuart Mangan Appeal.

He lives in Sydney Australia and is the founder of Crossing the Line Sport – an organisation dedicated to athlete mental health and transition out of sport. He is a regular speaker on the topic of transition, especially the transition from elite athlete to the next phase of life.
