= Victor Feddersen =

Danish rower

Personal information
- Full name: Victor Alexander Feddersen
- Born: 31 January 1968 (age 58) Gentofte, Denmark
- Height: 179 cm (5 ft 10 in)
- Weight: 71 kg (157 lb)

Sport
- Sport: Rowing
Medal record
Men's rowing
Representing Denmark
Olympic Games
Gold medal – first place	1996 Atlanta	Lwt coxless four
Bronze medal – third place	2000 Sydney	Lwt coxless four

Victor Alexander Feddersen (born 31 January 1968) is a Danish former competition rower, Olympic champion and world record holder. He was born in Gentofte and active in rowing between 1985 and 2000.

Feddersen won a gold medal in lightweight coxless four at the 1996 Summer Olympics. He was member of the Gold Four that set a world record in 1999, with the time 5:45.60 (on 2000 metres).

After his career Feddersen got engaged in organisational work in Danmarks Idrætsforbund.
