= Huang Zhongming =

Chinese rower (born 1982)

Huang Zhongming (born 8 April 1982) is a male Chinese rower. He competed for Team China at the 2008 Summer Olympics. "Ming" used to coach at the Gorge Rowing and Paddling center in Victoria, BC. In the spring of 2011 he moved back to China. He is listed twice on the FISA database; once as a rower and once as a coach. Born in Guangzhou, Guangdong.

== Major performances ==
- 2002/2003 National Spring Championships – 1st lightweight pairs;
- 2006 World Championships – 1st lightweight fours;
- 2007/2008 World Cup Leg 1 – 1st lightweight fours;
- 2007 World Championships – 5th lightweight fours
