= Mads Rasmussen =

Danish rower (born 1981)

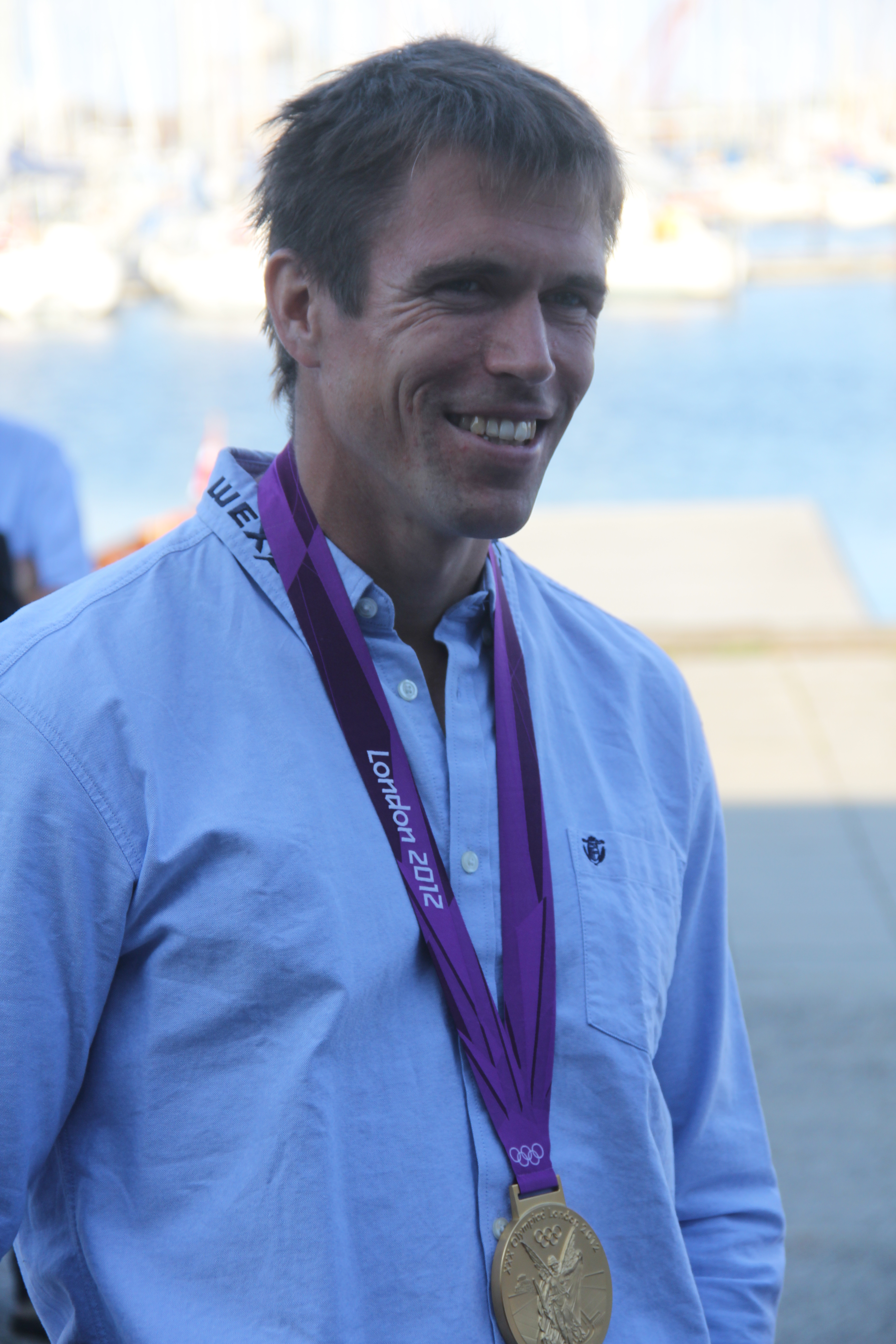

Medal record

Men's rowing

Representing Denmark

Olympic Games
Gold medal – first place	2012 London	Lightweight double sculls
Bronze medal – third place	2008 Beijing	Lightweight double sculls

World Championships
Gold medal – first place	2006 Eton	Lightweight double sculls
Gold medal – first place	2007 Munich	Lightweight double sculls
Silver medal – second place	2005 Gifu	Lightweight double sculls
Bronze medal – third place	2002 Seville	Lightweight double sculls
Bronze medal – third place	2009 Poznań	Lightweight single sculls

Mads Reinholdt Rasmussen (born 24 November 1981 in Idestrup on Falster) is a Danish rower and double World Champion and Olympic Gold winner in the lightweight double sculls, with his partner Rasmus Quist Hansen. Rasmussen and Quist placed fourth in the 2004 Summer Olympics in Athens, third in the 2008 Summer Olympics in Beijing, and first in the 2012 Summer Olympics in London.

Awards and achievements
Preceded by Mikkel Kessler	Danish Sports Name of the Year; 2007 (with Rasmus Quist Hansen)	Succeeded by Denmark men's national handball team
