= Wu Chongkui =

Chinese rower

Wu Chongkui (born 29 March 1989, in Jiangsu) is a male Chinese rower, who has competed for Team China at the 2008 Summer Olympics.

== Major performances ==
- 2005 National Games – 1st LM2X;
- 2006 World Championships – 1st lightweight fours;
- 2007 World Cup Leg 1/2 – 1st lightweight fours;
- 2007 World Championships – 5th lightweight fours;
- 2008 World Cup Leg 1 – 1st lightweight fours
