= Rasmus Quist Hansen =

Danish rower (born 1980)

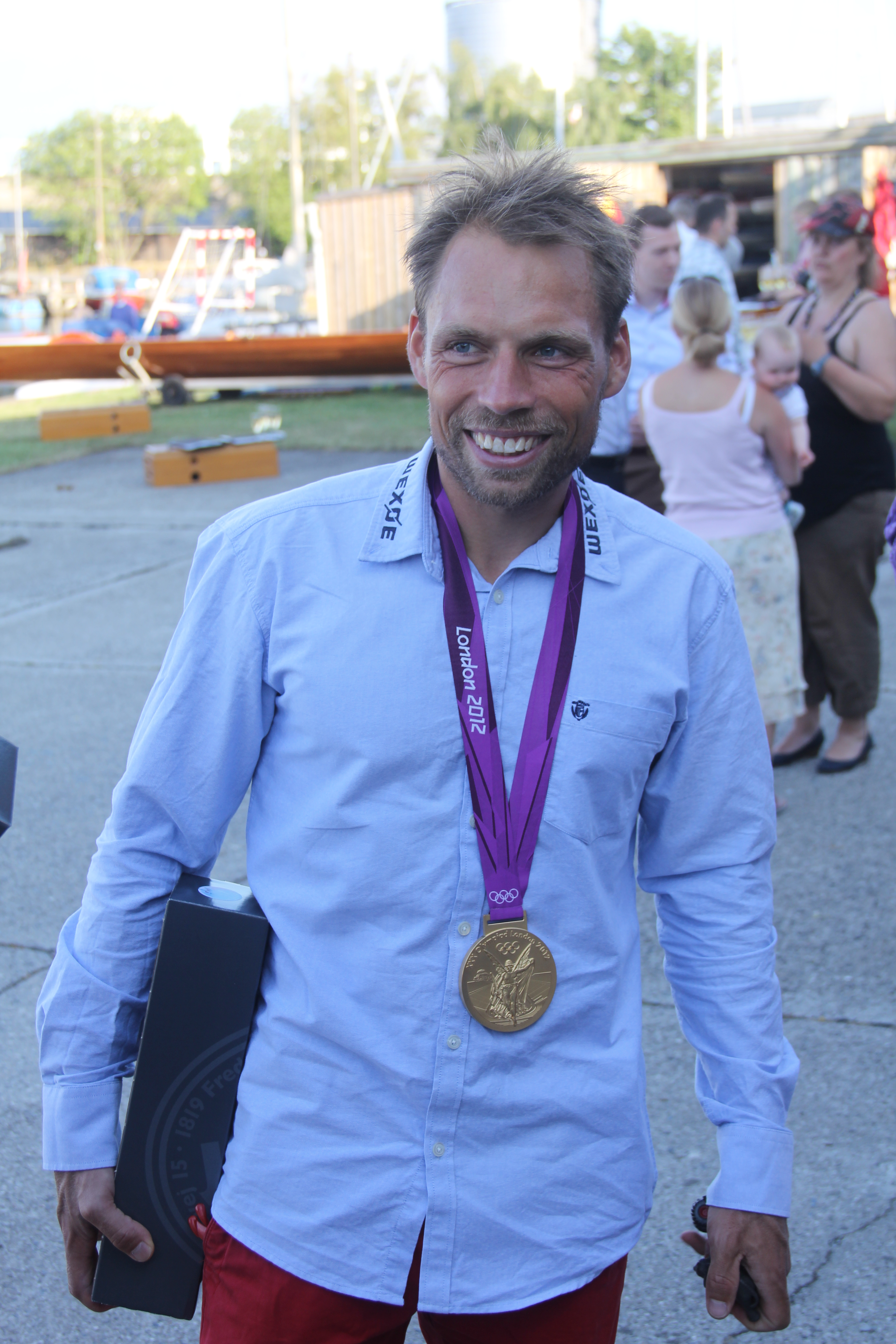

Medal record

Men's rowing

Representing Denmark

Olympic Games
Gold medal – first place	2012 London	Lightweight double sculls
Bronze medal – third place	2008 Beijing	Lightweight double sculls

World Championships
Gold medal – first place	2006 Eton	Lightweight double sculls
Gold medal – first place	2007 Munich	Lightweight double sculls
Silver medal – second place	2005 Gifu	Lightweight double sculls
Bronze medal – third place	2002 Seville	Lightweight double sculls
Bronze medal – third place	2009 Poznań	Lightweight quadruple sculls

Rasmus Quist Hansen (born 5 April 1980 in Middelfart), also known as Rasmus Quist, is a Danish rower and double World Champion in the lightweight double sculls, with his partner Mads Rasmussen.

Quist and Rasmussen placed first in the 2012 Summer Olympics in London, third in the 2008 Summer Olympics in Beijing and fourth in the 2004 Summer Olympics in Athens.

Awards and achievements
Preceded by Mikkel Kessler	Danish Sports Name of the Year; 2007 (with Mads Rasmussen)	Succeeded by Denmark men's national handball team
