= Tian Jun (rower) =

Chinese rower

Tian Jun (Chinese: 田军; pinyin: Tián Jūn; born 1 January 1982 in Zhongxiang, Jingmen, Hubei) is a male Chinese rower, who competed for Team China at the 2008 Summer Olympics.

== Major performances ==
- 2006 World Championships – 1st lightweight fours;
- 2007 World Cup Leg 1/2 – 1st lightweight fours;
- 2007 World Championships – 5th lightweight fours;
- 2008 World Cup Leg 1 – 1st lightweight fours
