= Stephan Mølvig =

Danish lightweight rower (born 1979)

Medal record

Men's rowing

Representing Denmark

Olympic Games
Gold medal – first place	2004 Athens	Lightweight coxless four

World Championships
Gold medal – first place	2002 Seville	Lightweight coxless four
Gold medal – first place	2003 Milan	Lightweight coxless four
Silver medal – second place	2001 Lucerne	Lightweight Eight

Stephan Mølvig (born 13 February 1979 in Odense) is a Danish lightweight rower who has won one Olympic and two World Championship gold medals.

He studied at St Catherine's College, Oxford (2005, School of Geography and the Environment, University of Oxford), which has a strong Olympic Games tradition.
