= Thomas Ebert =

Danish lightweight rower

Medal record

Men's rowing

Representing Denmark

Olympic Games
Gold medal – first place	2004 Athens	Lightweight coxless four
Gold medal – first place	2008 Beijing	Lightweight coxless four
Bronze medal – third place	2000 Sydney	Lightweight coxless four

Thomas Ebert (born 23 July 1973 in Roskilde, Sjælland) is a Danish lightweight rower who won gold at the 2004 and 2008 Summer Olympics in the Men's Lightweight Coxless Fours with the Gold Four.

He lives near Roskilde and is still active into sport, although not on elite-level. Mostly, this regards running, sailing, and some rowing on national level.
