= Single sculls at the Olympics =

Olympic sport

Single sculls at the Olympic Games
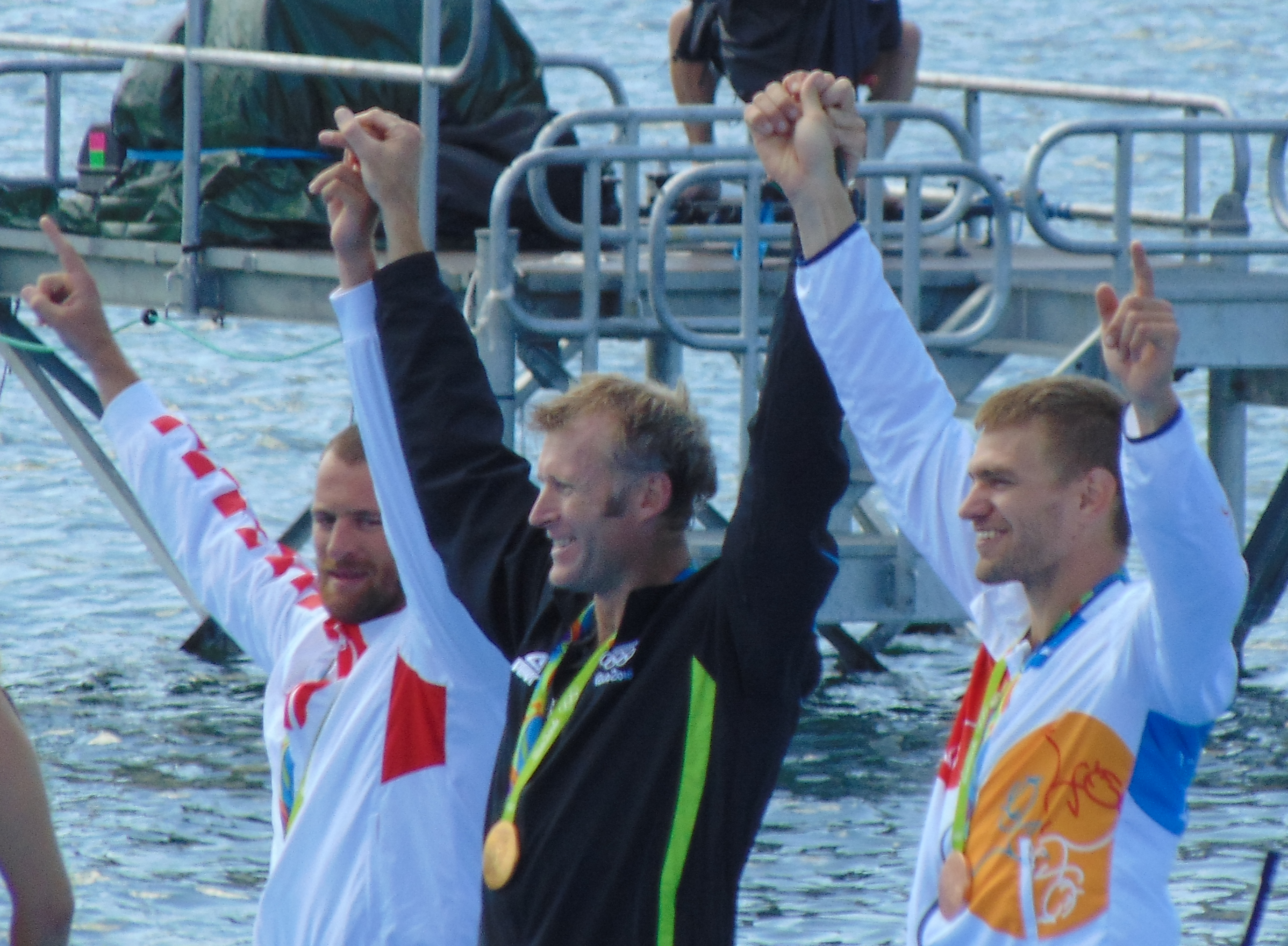
- Medal ceremony of the men's single sculls in 2016

Overview
- Sport: Rowing
- Gender: Men and women
- Years held: Men: 1900–2024; Women: 1976–2024

Reigning champion
- Men: Oliver Zeidler (GER)
- Women: Karolien Florijn (NED)

The single sculls is a rowing event held at the Summer Olympics. The event was first held for men at the second modern Olympics in 1900, and has been held every Games since. The women's competition was added in 1976.

== Medalists ==
=== Men ===
Games	Gold	Silver	Bronze
1900 Paris	Hermann Barrelet; France	André Gaudin; France	Saint-George Ashe; Great Britain
1904 St. Louis	Frank Greer; United States	James Juvenal; United States	Constance Titus; United States
1908 London	Harry Blackstaffe; Great Britain	Alexander McCulloch; Great Britain	Bernhard von Gaza; Germany Károly Levitzky; Hungary
1912 Stockholm	Wally Kinnear; Great Britain	Polydore Veirman; Belgium	Everard Butler; Canada Mart Kuusik; Russian Empire
1920 Antwerp	John B. Kelly Sr. United States	Jack Beresford; Great Britain	Darcy Hadfield; New Zealand
1924 Paris	Jack Beresford; Great Britain	William Gilmore; United States	Josef Schneider; Switzerland
1928 Amsterdam	Bobby Pearce; Australia	Ken Myers; United States	David Collet; Great Britain
1932 Los Angeles	Bobby Pearce; Australia	William Miller; United States	Guillermo Douglas; Uruguay
1936 Berlin	Gustav Schäfer; Germany	Josef Hasenöhrl; Austria	Dan Barrow; United States
1948 London	Mervyn Wood; Australia	Eduardo Risso; Uruguay	Romolo Catasta; Italy
1952 Helsinki	Yuriy Tyukalov; Soviet Union	Mervyn Wood; Australia	Teodor Kocerka; Poland
1956 Melbourne	Vyacheslav Ivanov; Soviet Union	Stuart Mackenzie; Australia	John B. Kelly Jr. United States
1960 Rome	Vyacheslav Ivanov; Soviet Union	Achim Hill; United Team of Germany	Teodor Kocerka; Poland
1964 Tokyo	Vyacheslav Ivanov; Soviet Union	Achim Hill; United Team of Germany	Gottfried Kottmann; Switzerland
1968 Mexico City	Jan Wienese; Netherlands	Jochen Meißner; West Germany	Alberto Demiddi; Argentina
1972 Munich	Yury Malyshev; Soviet Union	Alberto Demiddi; Argentina	Wolfgang Güldenpfennig; East Germany
1976 Montreal	Pertti Karppinen; Finland	Peter-Michael Kolbe; West Germany	Joachim Dreifke; East Germany
1980 Moscow	Pertti Karppinen; Finland	Vasil Yakusha; Soviet Union	Peter Kersten; East Germany
1984 Los Angeles	Pertti Karppinen; Finland	Peter-Michael Kolbe; West Germany	Robert Mills; Canada
1988 Seoul	Thomas Lange; East Germany	Peter-Michael Kolbe; West Germany	Eric Verdonk; New Zealand
1992 Barcelona	Thomas Lange; Germany	Václav Chalupa; Czechoslovakia	Kajetan Broniewski; Poland
1996 Atlanta	Xeno Müller; Switzerland	Derek Porter; Canada	Thomas Lange; Germany
2000 Sydney	Rob Waddell; New Zealand	Xeno Müller; Switzerland	Marcel Hacker; Germany
2004 Athens	Olaf Tufte; Norway	Jüri Jaanson; Estonia	Ivo Yanakiev; Bulgaria
2008 Beijing	Olaf Tufte; Norway	Ondřej Synek; Czech Republic	Mahé Drysdale; New Zealand
2012 London	Mahé Drysdale; New Zealand	Ondřej Synek; Czech Republic	Alan Campbell; Great Britain
2016 Rio de Janeiro	Mahé Drysdale; New Zealand	Damir Martin; Croatia	Ondřej Synek; Czech Republic
2020 Tokyo	Stefanos Ntouskos; Greece	Kjetil Borch; Norway	Damir Martin; Croatia
2024 Paris	Oliver Zeidler; Germany	Yauheni Zalaty; Individual Neutral Athletes	Simon van Dorp; Netherlands
2028 Los Angeles			

==== Multiple medalists ====
Rank	Rower	Nation	Olympics	Gold	Silver	Bronze	Total
1	Vyacheslav Ivanov	Soviet Union	1956–1964	3	0	0	3
1	Pertti Karppinen	Finland	1976–1984	3	0	0	3
3	Thomas Lange	East Germany; Germany	1988–1996	2	0	1	3
3	Mahé Drysdale	New Zealand	2008–2016	2	0	1	3
5	Bobby Pearce	Australia	1928–1932	2	0	0	2
5	Olaf Tufte	Norway	2004–2008	2	0	0	2
7	Jack Beresford	Great Britain	1920–1924	1	1	0	2
7	Mervyn Wood	Australia	1948–1952	1	1	0	2
7	Xeno Müller	Switzerland	1996–2000	1	1	0	2
10	Peter-Michael Kolbe	West Germany	1976, 1984–1988	0	3	0	3
11	Ondřej Synek	Czech Republic	2008–2016	0	2	1	3
12	Achim Hill	United Team of Germany	1960–1964	0	2	0	2
13	Alberto Demiddi	Argentina	1968–1972	0	1	1	2
14	Teodor Kocerka	Poland	1952, 1960	0	0	2	2

==== Medalists by country ====
Rank	Nation	Gold	Silver	Bronze	Total
1	Soviet Union	5	1	0	6
2	Great Britain	3	2	3	8
3	Australia	3	2	0	5
4	Finland	3	0	0	3
5	United States	2	4	3	9
6	New Zealand	3	0	3	6
7	Germany	2	0	2	4
8	Norway	2	0	0	2
9	France	1	1	0	2
10	East Germany	1	0	3	4
11	Switzerland	1	0	2	3
12	Greece	1	0	0	1
13	Netherlands	1	0	0	1
14	West Germany	0	4	0	4
15	Czech Republic	0	2	1	3
16	United Team of Germany	0	2	0	2
17	Canada	0	1	2	3
18	Argentina	0	1	1	2
18	Uruguay	0	1	1	2
20	Austria	0	1	0	1
20	Belgium	0	1	0	1
20	Croatia	0	1	0	1
20	Czechoslovakia	0	1	0	1
20	Estonia	0	1	0	1
25	Poland	0	0	3	3
26	Bulgaria	0	0	1	1
26	Hungary	0	0	1	1
26	Italy	0	0	1	1
26	Russian Empire	0	0	1	1

=== Women ===
Games	Gold	Silver	Bronze
1976 Montreal	Christine Scheiblich; East Germany	Joan Lind; United States	Yelena Antonova; Soviet Union
1980 Moscow	Sanda Toma; Romania	Antonina Makhina; Soviet Union	Martina Schröter; East Germany
1984 Los Angeles	Valeria Răcilă; Romania	Charlotte Geer; United States	Ann Haesebrouck; Belgium
1988 Seoul	Jutta Behrendt; East Germany	Anne Marden; United States	Magdalena Georgieva; Bulgaria
1992 Barcelona	Elisabeta Lipă; Romania	Annelies Bredael; Belgium	Silken Laumann; Canada
1996 Atlanta	Ekaterina Karsten; Belarus	Silken Laumann; Canada	Trine Hansen; Denmark
2000 Sydney	Ekaterina Karsten; Belarus	Rumyana Neykova; Bulgaria	Katrin Rutschow-Stomporowski; Germany
2004 Athens	Katrin Rutschow-Stomporowski; Germany	Ekaterina Karsten; Belarus	Rumyana Neykova; Bulgaria
2008 Beijing	Rumyana Neykova; Bulgaria	Michelle Guerette; United States	Ekaterina Karsten; Belarus
2012 London	Miroslava Knapková; Czech Republic	Fie Udby Erichsen; Denmark	Kim Brennan; Australia
2016 Rio de Janeiro	Kim Brennan; Australia	Genevra Stone; United States	Duan Jingli; China
2020 Tokyo	Emma Twigg; New Zealand	Hanna Prakatsen; ROC	Magdalena Lobnig; Austria
2024 Paris	Karolien Florijn; Netherlands	Emma Twigg; New Zealand	Viktorija Senkutė; Lithuania
2028 Los Angeles			

==== Multiple medalists ====
Rank	Gymnast	Nation	Olympics	Gold	Silver	Bronze	Total
1	Ekaterina Karsten	Belarus	1996–2008	2	1	1	4
2	Rumyana Neykova	Bulgaria	2000–2008	1	1	1	3
3	Emma Twigg	New Zealand	2020–2024	1	1	0	2
3	Katrin Rutschow-Stomporowski	Germany	2000–2004	1	0	1	2
3	Kim Brennan	Australia	2012–2016	1	0	1	2
6	Silken Laumann	Canada	1992–1996	0	1	1	2

==== Medalists by country ====
Rank	Nation	Gold	Silver	Bronze	Total
1	Romania	3	0	0	3
2	Belarus	2	1	1	4
3	East Germany	2	0	1	3
4	Bulgaria	1	1	2	4
5	New Zealand	1	1	0	2
5	Germany	1	0	1	2
5	Australia	1	0	1	2
7	Czech Republic	1	0	0	1
8	United States	0	5	0	5
9	Belgium	0	1	1	2
9	Canada	0	1	1	2
9	Denmark	0	1	1	2
9	Soviet Union	0	1	1	2
13	China	0	0	1	1
