= Rowing at the 2008 Summer Olympics – Women's single sculls =

Women's single sculls at the Games of the XXIX Olympiad

Medalists
1st place, gold medalist(s)		Rumyana Neykova	Bulgaria
2nd place, silver medalist(s)		Michelle Guerette	United States
3rd place, bronze medalist(s)		Ekaterina Karsten	Belarus

Women's single sculls competition at the 2008 Summer Olympics in Beijing was held between August 9 and 16, at the Shunyi Olympic Rowing-Canoeing Park.

This rowing event is a single scull event, meaning that each boat is propelled by a single rower. The "scull" portion means that the rower uses two oars, one on each side of the boat; this contrasts with sweep rowing in which each rower has one oar and rows on only one side (not feasible for singles events!). The competition consists of multiple rounds. Finals were held to determine the placing of each boat; these finals were given letters with those nearer to the beginning of the alphabet meaning a better ranking. Semifinals were named based on which finals they fed, with each semifinal having two possible finals.

During the first round six heats were held. The top three boats in each heat advance to the quarterfinals, together with the 6 fastest of the remaining scullers, while all others are relegated to the E/F semifinals.

The quarterfinals were the second round for rowers still competing for medals. Placing in the quarterfinal heats determined which semifinal the boat would race in. The top three boats in each quarterfinal moved on to the A/B semifinals, with the bottom three boats going to the C/D semifinals.

Six semifinals were held, two each of A/B semifinals, C/D semifinals, and E/F semifinals. For each semifinal race, the top three boats moved on to the better of the two finals, while the bottom three boats went to the lesser of the two finals possible. For example, a second-place finish in an A/B semifinal would result in advancement to the A final.

The fourth and final round was the Finals. Each final determined a set of rankings. The A final determined the medals, along with the rest of the places through 6th. The B final gave rankings from 7th to 12th, the C from 13th to 18th, and so on. Thus, to win a medal rowers had to finish in the top four of their heat, top three of their quarterfinal, and top three of their A/B semifinal to reach the A final.

== Schedule ==
All times are China Standard Time (UTC+8)

Date	Time	Round
Saturday, August 9, 2008	13:50-14:50	Heats
Monday, August 11, 2008	15:30-16:10	Quarterfinals
Wednesday, August 13, 2008	14:50-15:10	Semifinals C/D
Wednesday, August 13, 2008	15:30-15:50	Semifinals A/B
Friday, August 15, 2008	14:10-14:20	Final E
Friday, August 15, 2008	14:30-14:40	Final D
Friday, August 15, 2008	14:50-15:00	Final C
Friday, August 15, 2008	16:50-17:00	Final B
Saturday, August 16, 2008	15:30-15:40	Final A

== Results ==
=== Heats ===
- Qualification Rules: 1-3->Q, 4..->Q or FE

==== Heat 1 ====
Rank	Rower	Country	Time	Notes
1	Zhang Xiuyun	China	7:38.16	Q
2	Julia Michalska	Poland	7:41.16	Q
3	Sophie Balmary	France	7:47.37	Q
4	Gabriela Best	Argentina	7:58.60	Q
5	Soraya Jadue	Chile	8:04.08	Q

==== Heat 2 ====
Rank	Rower	Country	Time	Notes
1	Emma Twigg	New Zealand	7:45.18	Q
2	Iva Obradović	Serbia	7:49.13	Q
3	Nuria Domínguez	Spain	7:58.03	Q
4	Fabiana Beltrame	Brazil	8:08.84	Q
5	Lee Ka Man	Hong Kong	8:23.02	Q

==== Heat 3 ====
Rank	Rower	Country	Time	Notes
1	Ekaterina Karsten	Belarus	7:40.03	Q
2	Michelle Guerette	United States	7:49.14	Q
3	Sin Yeong-eun	South Korea	8:17.40	Q
4	Inga Dudchenko	Kazakhstan	8:28.24	Q

==== Heat 4 ====
Rank	Rower	Country	Time	Notes
1	Rumyana Neykova	Bulgaria	7:56.07	Q
2	Mayra González	Cuba	8:07.22	Q
3	Rika Geyser	South Africa	8:20.26	Q
4	Shwe Zin Latt	Myanmar	8:42.23	Q

==== Heat 5 ====
Rank	Rower	Country	Time	Notes
1	Gabriella Bascelli	Italy	7:43.67	Q
2	Pippa Savage	Australia	7:57.95	Q
3	Camila Vargas	El Salvador	8:32.06	Q
4	Homa Hosseini	Iran	9:02.12	FE

==== Heat 6 ====
Rank	Rower	Country	Time	Notes
1	Miroslava Knapková	Czech Republic	7:51.56	Q
2	Frida Svensson	Sweden	7:56.39	Q
3	Elana Hill	Zimbabwe	8:35.53	Q
4	Heba Ahmed	Egypt	8:46.96	FE

=== Quarterfinals ===
- Qualification Rules: 1-3->SA/B, 4..->SC/D

==== Quarterfinal 1 ====
Rank	Athlete	Country	Time	Notes
1	Michelle Guerette	United States	7:28.91	SA/B
2	Julia Michalska	Poland	7:31.90	SA/B
3	Gabriella Bascelli	Italy	7:36.68	SA/B
4	Nuria Domínguez	Spain	7:49.60	SC/D
5	Inga Dudchenko	Kazakhstan	8:15.88	SC/D
6	Elana Hill	Zimbabwe	8:20.84	SC/D

==== Quarterfinal 2 ====
Rank	Athlete	Country	Time	Notes
1	Miroslava Knapková	Czech Republic	7:30.33	SA/B
2	Sophie Balmary	France	7:37.01	SA/B
3	Iva Obradović	Serbia	7:39.16	SA/B
4	Mayra González	Cuba	7:45.75	SC/D
5	Camila Vargas	El Salvador	8:11.79	SC/D
6	Shwe Zin Latt	Myanmar	8:17.76	SC/D

==== Quarterfinal 3 ====
Rank	Athlete	Country	Time	Notes
1	Rumyana Neykova	Bulgaria	7:22.37	SA/B
2	Zhang Xiuyun	China	7:23.30	SA/B
3	Pippa Savage	Australia	7:34.03	SA/B
4	Soraya Jadue	Chile	7:51.52	SC/D
5	Fabiana Beltrame	Brazil	7:52.65	SC/D
6	Shin Yeong-eun	South Korea	7:58.71	SC/D

==== Quarterfinal 4 ====
Rank	Athlete	Country	Time	Notes
1	Ekaterina Karsten	Belarus	7:25.74	SA/B
2	Frida Svensson	Sweden	7:29.29	SA/B
3	Emma Twigg	New Zealand	7:34.24	SA/B
4	Rika Geyser	South Africa	7:44.14	SC/D
5	Gabriela Best	Argentina	7:46.45	SC/D
6	Lee Ka Man	Hong Kong	8:04.68	SC/D

=== Semifinals C/D ===
- Qualification Rules: 1-3->FC, 4-5->FD, 6..->FE

==== Semifinal C/D 1 ====
Rank	Athlete	Country	Time	Notes
1	Mayra González	Cuba	8:02.10	FC
2	Nuria Domínguez	Spain	8:03.61	FC
3	Gabriela Best	Argentina	8:09.61	FC
4	Fabiana Beltrame	Brazil	8:13.01	FD
5	Shin Yeong-eun	South Korea	8:23.62	FD
6	Elana Hill	Zimbabwe	8:34.27	FE

==== Semifinal C/D 2 ====
Rank	Athlete	Country	Time	Notes
1	Rika Geyser	South Africa	7:59.67	FC
2	Soraya Jadue	Chile	8:13.67	FC
3	Inga Dudchenko	Kazakhstan	8:16.95	FC
4	Camila Vargas	El Salvador	8:22.35	FD
5	Shwe Zin Latt	Myanmar	8:24.23	FD
6	Lee Ka Man	Hong Kong	8:30.80	FE

=== Semifinals A/B ===
- Qualification Rules: 1-3->FA, 4..->FB

==== Semifinal A/B 1 ====
Rank	Athlete	Country	Time	Notes
1	Zhang Xiuyun	China	7:31.33	FA
2	Michelle Guerette	United States	7:35.69	FA
3	Miroslava Knapková	Czech Republic	7:38.14	FA
4	Gabriella Bascelli	Italy	7:42.10	FB
5	Pippa Savage	Australia	7:43.98	FB
6	Frida Svensson	Sweden	7:46.38	FB

==== Semifinal A/B 2 ====
Rank	Athlete	Country	Time	Notes
1	Ekaterina Karsten	Belarus	7:32.86	FA
2	Rumyana Neykova	Bulgaria	7:33.29	FA
3	Julia Michalska	Poland	7:38.04	FA
4	Emma Twigg	New Zealand	7:38.09	FB
5	Iva Obradović	Serbia	7:52.39	FB
6	Sophie Balmary	France	7:56.73	FB

=== Finals ===
==== Final E ====
Rank	Athlete	Country	Time	Notes
1	Lee Ka Man	Hong Kong	7:56.07	
2	Heba Ahmed	Egypt	8:07.10	
3	Elana Hill	Zimbabwe	8:09.94	
4	Homa Hosseini	Iran	8:18.20	

==== Final D ====
Rank	Athlete	Country	Time	Notes
1	Fabiana Beltrame	Brazil	7:43.04	
2	Shin Yeong-eun	South Korea	7:48.31	
3	Shwe Zin Latt	Myanmar	8:00.05	
4	Camila Vargas	El Salvador	8:02.91	

==== Final C ====
Rank	Athlete	Country	Time	Notes
1	Rika Geyser	South Africa	7:35.06	
2	Nuria Domínguez	Spain	7:36.12	
3	Mayra González	Cuba	7:42.68	
4	Gabriela Best	Argentina	7:45.21	
5	Soraya Jadue	Chile	7:48.35	
6	Inga Dudchenko	Kazakhstan	8:16.09	

==== Final B ====
Rank	Athlete	Country	Time	Notes
1	Frida Svensson	Sweden	7:48.19	
2	Gabriella Bascelli	Italy	7:48.91	
3	Emma Twigg	New Zealand	7:51.63	
4	Pippa Savage	Australia	7:53.43	
5	Iva Obradović	Serbia	7:53.83	
6	Sophie Balmary	France	7:58.88	

==== Final A ====
Rank	Athlete	Country	Time	Notes
Gold medal	Rumyana Neykova	Bulgaria	7:22.34	
Silver medal	Michelle Guerette	United States	7:22.78	
Bronze medal	Ekaterina Karsten	Belarus	7:23.98	
4	Zhang Xiuyun	China	7:25.48	
5	Miroslava Knapková	Czech Republic	7:35.52	
6	Julia Michalska	Poland	7:43.44	
