= Rowing at the 2004 Summer Olympics – Women's single sculls =

Women's single sculls at the Games of the XXVIII Olympiad

Medalists
1st place, gold medalist(s)		Katrin Rutschow-Stomporowski	Germany
2nd place, silver medalist(s)		Ekaterina Karsten	Belarus
3rd place, bronze medalist(s)		Rumyana Neykova	Bulgaria

These are the results of the Women's single sculls competition, one of six events for female competitors in Rowing at the 2004 Summer Olympics in Athens.

== Heats ==
24 competitors raced in four heats on August 14. The top boats in each heat advanced to the semifinals, and the remaining boats moved to the repechage.

- SF denotes qualification to semifinal
- R denotes qualification to repechage

=== Heat 1 ===
Rank	Athlete Name	Country	Time	Notes
1	Katrin Rutschow-Stomporowski	Germany	7:35.20	SF
2	Carolina Lüthi	Switzerland	7:49.88	R
3	Femke Dekker	Netherlands	7:55.50	R
4	Rocio Rivarola	Paraguay	8:03.85	R
5	Lee Yun-hui	South Korea	8:04.48	R
6	Doaa Moussa	Egypt	8:26.87	R

=== Heat 2 ===
Rank	Athlete Name	Country	Time	Notes
1	Miroslava Knapková	Czech Republic	7:25.23	SF
2	Sonia Waddell	New Zealand	7:36.15	R
3	Soraya Jadué	Chile	7:58.28	R
4	Analía Marín	Argentina	8:01.56	R
5	Pere Koroba	Indonesia	8:04.76	R
6	Ibtissem Trimech	Tunisia	8:15.87	R

=== Heat 3 ===
Rank	Athlete Name	Country	Time	Notes
1	Ekaterina Karsten	Belarus	7:45.22	SF
2	Jennifer Devine	United States	7:55.15	R
3	Mu Suli	China	7:58.92	R
4	Fabiana Beltrame	Brazil	8:02.89	R
5	Phuttharaksa Neegree	Thailand	8:24.03	R
6	Yelena Usarova	Uzbekistan	8:32.56	R

=== Heat 4 ===
Rank	Athlete Name	Country	Time	Notes
1	Rumyana Neykova	Bulgaria	7:35.66	SF
2	Irina Fedotova	Russia	7:51.71	R
3	Frida Svensson	Sweden	7:54.29	R
4	Nuria Domínguez	Spain	7:55.60	R
5	Martha Garcia Mayo	Mexico	8:07.32	R
6	Chiang Chien-ju	Chinese Taipei	8:15.86	R

== Repechages ==
20 competitors raced in four repechages on August 17. All Competitors advanced to the semi-final.

=== Repechage 1 ===
Rank	Athlete Name	Country	Time
1	Martha Garcia Mayo	Mexico	7:35.55
2	Soraya Jadué	Chile	7:37.60
3	Carolina Lüthi	Switzerland	7:37.90
4	Fabiana Beltrame	Brazil	7:48.74
5	Doaa Moussa	Egypt	8:16.57

=== Repechage 2 ===
Rank	Athlete Name	Country	Time
1	Sonia Waddell	New Zealand	7:27.92
2	Nuria Domínguez	Spain	7:40.31
3	Mu Suli	China	7:48.09
4	Ibtissem Trimech	Tunisia	7:56.19
5	Lee Yoon-hui	South Korea	7:59.53

=== Repechage 3 ===
Rank	Athlete Name	Country	Time
1	Frida Svensson	Sweden	7:35.35
2	Jennifer Devine	United States	7:25.91
3	Pere Koroba	Indonesia	7:54.17
4	Rocio Rivarola	Paraguay	7:57.77
5	Elena Usarova	Uzbekistan	8:06.11

=== Repechage 4 ===
Rank	Athlete Name	Country	Time
1	Irina Fedotova	Russia	7:35.83
2	Femke Dekker	Netherlands	7:39.84
3	Chiang Chien-ju	Chinese Taipei	7:48.36
4	Analia Marin	Argentina	7:51.94
5	Phuttharaksa Neegree	Thailand	7:53.52

== Semifinals ==
24 competitors raced in the semifinals on August 18, 2004. They were moved forward to finals A-D based on their time.

- FA denotes qualification to Final A.
- FB denotes qualification to Final B
- FC denotes qualification to Final C.
- FD denotes qualification to Final D.

=== Semifinal 1 ===
Rank	Athlete Name	Country	Time	Notes
1	Katrin Rutschow-Stomporowski	Germany	7:35.20	FA
2	Miroslava Knapková	Czech Republic	7:36.73	FA
3	Nuria Domínguez	Spain	7:43.59	FA
4	Irina Fedotova	Russia	7:45.43	FB
5	Frida Svensson	Sweden	7:53.83	FB
6	Soraya Jadué	Chile	8:16.21	FB

=== Semifinal 2 ===
Rank	Athlete Name	Country	Time	Notes
1	Ekaterina Karsten	Belarus	7:31.91	FA
2	Rumyana Neykova	Bulgaria	7:32.06	FA
3	Sonia Waddell	New Zealand	7:42.00	FA
4	Jennifer Devine	United States	7:53.65	FB
5	Martha Garcia Mayo	Mexico	8:04.83	FB
6	Femke Dekker	Netherlands	8:10.76	FB

=== Semifinal 3 ===
Rank	Athlete Name	Country	Time	Notes
1	Carolina Lüthi	Switzerland	7:47.33	FC
2	Mu Suli	China	7:48.54	FC
3	Analia Marin	Argentina	7:58.07	FC
4	Lee Yoon-hui	South Korea	8:03.01	FD
5	Rocio Rivarola	Paraguay	8:05.92	FD
6	Doaa Moussa	Egypt	8:22.45	FD

=== Semifinal 4 ===
Rank	Athlete Name	Country	Time	Notes
1	Fabiana Beltrame	Brazil	8:00.89	FC
2	Chiang Chien-ju	Chinese Taipei	8:05.71	FC
3	Pere Koroba	Indonesia	8:09.21	FC
4	Ibtissem Trimech	Tunisia	8:14.73	FD
5	Phuttharaksa Neegree	Thailand	8:17.13	FD
6	Elena Usarova	Uzbekistan	8:34.04	FD

== Finals ==
All 24 competitors raced on 19 August 2004 in the Finals.

=== Final A ===
Rank	Athlete Name	Country	Time
1st place, gold medalist(s)	Katrin Rutschow-Stomporowski	Germany	7:18.12
2nd place, silver medalist(s)	Ekaterina Karsten	Belarus	7:22.04
3rd place, bronze medalist(s)	Rumyana Neykova	Bulgaria	7:23.10
4	Miroslava Knapková	Czech Republic	7:25.14
5	Sonia Waddell	New Zealand	7:31.66
6	Nuria Domínguez	Spain	7:49.11

=== Final B ===
Rank	Athlete Name	Country	Time
1	Irina Fedotova	Russia	7:29.04
2	Frida Svensson	Sweden	7:32.02
3	Jennifer Devine	United States	7:33.69
4	Femke Dekker	Netherlands	7:39.15
5	Soraya Jadué	Chile	7:42.76
6	Martha Garcia Mayo	Mexico	7:43.44

=== Final C ===
Rank	Athlete Name	Country	Time
1	Mu Suli	China	7:39.64
2	Fabiana Beltrame	Brazil	7:43.38
3	Carolina Lüthi	Switzerland	7:44.11
4	Pere Koroba	Indonesia	7:47.92
5	Chiang Chien-ju	Chinese Taipei	7:49.13
6	Analia Marin	Argentina	DNF

=== Final D ===
Rank	Athlete Name	Country	Time
1	Ibtissem Trimech	Tunisia	7:51.21
2	Lee Yoon-hui	South Korea	7:53.33
3	Rocio Rivarola	Paraguay	7:57.36
4	Phuttharaksa Neegree	Thailand	8:00.44
5	Elena Usarova	Uzbekistan	8:09.92
6	Doaa Moussa	Egypt	8:34.80
