= Rowing at the 2006 Asian Games – Women's double sculls =

Women's double sculls at the 2006 Asian Games
- Venue: West Bay Lagoon
- Date: 3–6 December 2006
- Competitors: 10 from 5 nations

Medalists
gold medal	Tian Liang; Li Qin	China
silver medal	Kim Ok-kyung; Shin Yeong-eun	South Korea
bronze medal	Mariya Filimonova; Inga Dudchenko	Kazakhstan

The women's double sculls competition at the 2006 Asian Games in Doha was held from 3 December to 6 December at the West Bay Lagoon.

Since Doha was scarce of water the distance had to be shortened from standard 2000 meters to 1000 meters.

== Schedule ==
All times are Arabia Standard Time (UTC+03:00)

Date	Time	Event
Sunday, 3 December 2006	09:30	Heats
Monday, 4 December 2006	09:30	Repechage
Wednesday, 6 December 2006	11:30	Final

== Results ==
=== Heats ===
- Qualification: 1 → Final (FA), 2–3 → Repechage (R)

==== Heat 1 ====
Rank	Team	Time	Notes
1	Thailand (THA); Bussayamas Phaengkathok; Phuttharaksa Neegree	4:36.93	FA
2	North Korea (PRK); Kim Hyang-sun; Kwom Yu-ran	4:47.47	R
3	Kazakhstan (KAZ); Mariya Filimonova; Inga Dudchenko	4:47.70	R

==== Heat 2 ====
Rank	Team	Time	Notes
1	China (CHN); Tian Liang; Li Qin	4:24.62	FA
2	South Korea (KOR); Kim Ok-kyung; Shin Yeong-eun	4:40.29	R

=== Repechage ===
- Qualification: 1–2 → Final (FA)

Rank	Team	Time	Notes
1	South Korea (KOR); Kim Ok-kyung; Shin Yeong-eun	4:24.80	FA
2	Kazakhstan (KAZ); Mariya Filimonova; Inga Dudchenko	4:31.66	FA
3	North Korea (PRK); Kim Hyang-sun; Kwom Yu-ran	4:36.39	

=== Final ===
Rank	Team	Time
1st place, gold medalist(s)	China (CHN); Tian Liang; Li Qin	3:41.84
2nd place, silver medalist(s)	South Korea (KOR); Kim Ok-kyung; Shin Yeong-eun	3:48.15
3rd place, bronze medalist(s)	Kazakhstan (KAZ); Mariya Filimonova; Inga Dudchenko	3:49.92
4	Thailand (THA); Bussayamas Phaengkathok; Phuttharaksa Neegree	4:00.15
