= Rowing at the 2006 Asian Games – Women's single sculls =

Women's single sculls at the 2006 Asian Games
- Venue: West Bay Lagoon
- Date: 3–7 December 2006
- Competitors: 9 from 9 nations

Medalists
gold medal	Jin Ziwei	China
silver medal	Ai Fukuchi	Japan
bronze medal	Pere Karoba	Indonesia

The women's single sculls competition at the 2006 Asian Games in Doha was held from 3 December to 7 December at the West Bay Lagoon.

Since Doha was scarce of water the distance had to be shortened from standard 2000 meters to 1000 meters.

== Schedule ==
All times are Arabia Standard Time (UTC+03:00)

Date	Time	Event
Sunday, 3 December 2006	15:10	Heats
Monday, 4 December 2006	14:50	Repechage
Tuesday, 5 December 2006	15:00	Semifinals
Thursday, 7 December 2006	11:00	Finals

== Results ==
=== Heats ===
- Qualification: 1–2 → Semifinals A/B (SA/B), 3 → Repechage (R)

==== Heat 1 ====
Rank	Athlete	Time	Notes
1	Phuttharaksa Neegree (THA)	5:08.30	SA/B
2	Yung Ka Yan (HKG)	5:13.04	SA/B
3	Elsie Lim (SIN)	5:15.80	R

==== Heat 2 ====
Rank	Athlete	Time	Notes
1	Jin Ziwei (CHN)	4:47.30	SA/B
2	Chiang Chien-ju (TPE)	5:04.20	SA/B
3	Mona Al-Qanai (KUW)	7:36.17	R

==== Heat 3 ====
Rank	Athlete	Time	Notes
1	Ai Fukuchi (JPN)	4:52.53	SA/B
2	Pere Karoba (INA)	5:10.82	SA/B
3	Đặng Thị Thắm (VIE)	5:32.95	R

=== Repechage ===
- Qualification: 1–2 → Semifinals A/B (SA/B)

Rank	Athlete	Time	Notes
1	Elsie Lim (SIN)	3:56.23	SA/B
2	Đặng Thị Thắm (VIE)	4:07.59	SA/B
3	Mona Al-Qanai (KUW)	4:33.25	

=== Semifinals ===
- Qualification: 1–2 → Final A (FA), 3–4 → Final B (FB)

==== Semifinal A/B 1 ====
Rank	Athlete	Time	Notes
1	Phuttharaksa Neegree (THA)	3:38.67	FA
2	Ai Fukuchi (JPN)	3:39.63	FA
3	Chiang Chien-ju (TPE)	3:44.21	FB
4	Elsie Lim (SIN)	3:49.40	FB

==== Semifinal A/B 2 ====
Rank	Athlete	Time	Notes
1	Jin Ziwei (CHN)	3:32.52	FA
2	Pere Karoba (INA)	3:50.31	FA
3	Yung Ka Yan (HKG)	3:58.72	FB
4	Đặng Thị Thắm (VIE)	4:05.88	FB

=== Finals ===
==== Final B ====
Rank	Athlete	Time
1	Chiang Chien-ju (TPE)	4:30.55
2	Elsie Lim (SIN)	4:33.77
3	Yung Ka Yan (HKG)	4:58.69
4	Đặng Thị Thắm (VIE)	5:05.16

==== Final A ====
Rank	Athlete	Time
1st place, gold medalist(s)	Jin Ziwei (CHN)	4:01.68
2nd place, silver medalist(s)	Ai Fukuchi (JPN)	4:09.09
3rd place, bronze medalist(s)	Pere Karoba (INA)	4:27.76
4	Phuttharaksa Neegree (THA)	4:42.52
