= Rowing at the 2012 Summer Olympics – Women's single sculls =

Women's single sculls at the Games of the XXX Olympiad
- Venue: Eton Dorney
- Date: 28 July – 4 August 2012
- Competitors: 28 from 28 nations
- Winning time: 7:54.37

Medalists
1st place, gold medalist(s)		Miroslava Knapková	Czech Republic
2nd place, silver medalist(s)		Fie Udby Erichsen	Denmark
3rd place, bronze medalist(s)		Kim Crow	Australia

The women's single sculls competition at the 2012 Summer Olympics in London took place are at Dorney Lake which, for the purposes of the Games venue, is officially termed Eton Dorney.

== Schedule ==
All times are British Summer Time (UTC+1)

Date	Time	Round
Saturday, 28 July 2012	13:30	Heats
Sunday, 29 July 2012	10:20	Repechages
Tuesday, 31 July 2012	11:40	Quarterfinals
Thursday, 2 August 2012	09:30	Semifinals C/D
Thursday, 2 August 2012	11:10	Semifinals
Saturday, 4 August 2012	09:30	Final E
Saturday, 4 August 2012	09:50	Final D
Saturday, 4 August 2012	10:20	Final C
Saturday, 4 August 2012	11:00	Final B
Saturday, 4 August 2012	12:30	Final

== Results ==
=== Heats ===
First four of each heat qualify to the quarterfinals, remainder goes to the repechage.

==== Heat 1 ====
Rank	Rower	Country	Time	Notes
1	Emma Twigg	New Zealand	7:40.24	Q
2	Donata Vištartaitė	Lithuania	7:43.07	Q
3	Sanita Pušpure	Ireland	7:49.35	Q
4	Kissya da Costa	Brazil	8:07.75	Q
5	Lucia Palermo	Argentina	8:07.89	R
6	Soulmaz Abbasi	Iran	8:17.46	R

==== Heat 2 ====
Rank	Rower	Country	Time	Notes
1	Kim Crow	Australia	7:41.18	Q
2	Nataliya Mustafayeva	Azerbaijan	7:46.01	Q
3	Micheen Thornycroft	Zimbabwe	7:47.10	Q
4	Yariulvis Cobas	Cuba	7:48.58	Q
5	Camila Vargas Palomo	El Salvador	8:01.60	R
6	Kim Ye-ji	South Korea	8:04.68	R

==== Heat 3 ====
Rank	Rower	Country	Time	Notes
1	Miroslava Knapková	Czech Republic	7:24.17	Q
2	Fie Udby Erichsen	Denmark	7:29.37	Q
3	Marie-Louise Dräger	Germany	7:44.23	Q
4	Phuttharaksa Neegree Rodenburg	Thailand	7:52.62	Q
5	Svetlana Germanovich	Kazakhstan	8:01.94	R
6	Racha Soula	Tunisia	8:19.31	R

==== Heat 4 ====
Rank	Rower	Country	Time	Notes
1	Zhang Xiuyun	China	7:21.49	Q
2	Frida Svensson	Sweden	7:32.61	Q
3	Gabriela Mosqueira Benitez	Paraguay	7:52.07	Q
4	Haruna Sakakibara	Japan	7:52.98	Q
5	Shwe Zin Latt	Myanmar	8:10.15	R

==== Heat 5 ====
Rank	Rower	Country	Time	Notes
1	Ekaterina Karsten	Belarus	7:30.31	Q
2	Yuliya Levina	Russia	7:32.06	Q
3	Genevra Stone	United States	7:33.68	Q
4	Debora Oakley Gonzalez	Mexico	8:00.17	Q
5	Amina Rouba	Algeria	8:15.94	R

=== Repechage ===
First two qualify to the quarterfinals.

==== Repechage 1 ====
Rank	Rower	Country	Time	Notes
1	Kim Ye-ji	South Korea	7:50.64	Q
2	Lucia Palermo	Argentina	7:52.49	Q
3	Svetlana Germanovich	Kazakhstan	7:53.63	
4	Amina Rouba	Algeria	8:12.83	

==== Repechage 2 ====
Rank	Rower	Country	Time	Notes
1	Camila Vargas Palomo	El Salvador	7:53.38	Q
2	Soulmaz Abbasi	Iran	8:05.99	Q
3	Shwe Zin Latt	Myanmar	8:09.59	
4	Racha Soula	Tunisia	8:10.76	

=== Quarterfinals ===
First three qualify to the semifinals.

==== Quarterfinal 1 ====
Rank	Rower	Country	Time	Notes
1	Kim Crow	Australia	7:34.29	Q
2	Emma Twigg	New Zealand	7:39.07	Q
3	Marie-Louise Dräger	Germany	7:52.17	Q
4	Debora Oakley Gonzalez	Mexico	8:10.97	
5	Gabriela Mosqueira Benitez	Paraguay	8:14.36	
6	Soulmaz Abbasi	Iran	8:27.28	

==== Quarterfinal 2 ====
Rank	Rower	Country	Time	Notes
1	Miroslava Knapková	Czech Republic	7:35.35	Q
2	Genevra Stone	United States	7:39.67	Q
3	Frida Svensson	Sweden	7:40.64	Q
4	Sanita Pušpure	Ireland	7:44.19	
5	Yariulvis Cobas	Cuba	7:56.89	
6	Camila Vargas Palomo	El Salvador	8:07.67	

==== Quarterfinal 3 ====
Rank	Rower	Country	Time	Notes
1	Zhang Xiuyun	China	7:39.58	Q
2	Yuliya Levina	Russia	7:41.28	Q
3	Donata Vištartaitė	Lithuania	7:45.68	Q
4	Micheen Thornycroft	Zimbabwe	7:56.66	
5	Lucia Palermo	Argentina	8:06.47	
6	Phuttharaksa Neegree Rodenburg	Thailand	8:16.50	

==== Quarterfinal 4 ====
Rank	Rower	Country	Time	Notes
1	Fie Udby Erichsen	Denmark	7:38.93	Q
2	Ekaterina Karsten	Belarus	7:42.00	Q
3	Nataliya Mustafayeva	Azerbaijan	8:00.26	Q
4	Kim Ye-ji	South Korea	8:00.26	
5	Haruna Sakakibara	Japan	8:12.26	
6	Kissya da Costa	Brazil	8:12.85	

=== Semifinals ===
==== Semifinals C/D ====
First three qualify to Final C, remainder to Final D.

===== Semifinal 1 =====
Rank	Rower	Country	Time	Notes
1	Sanita Pušpure	Ireland	7:51.69	Q
2	Kissya da Costa	Brazil	8:01.64	Q
3	Phuttharaksa Neegree Rodenburg	Thailand	8:03.91	Q
4	Lucia Palermo	Argentina	8:09.85	
5	Debora Oakley Gonzalez	Mexico	8:14.03	
6	Soulmaz Abbasi	Iran	8:30.74	

===== Semifinal 2 =====
Rank	Rower	Country	Time	Notes
1	Micheen Thornycroft	Zimbabwe	7:51.02	Q
2	Yariulvis Cobas	Cuba	7:54.22	Q
3	Camila Vargas Palomo	El Salvador	7:57.22	Q
4	Kim Ye-ji	South Korea	7:59.78	
5	Haruna Sakakibara	Japan	8:05.65	
6	Gabriela Mosqueira Benitez	Paraguay	8:10.15	

==== Semifinals A/B ====
First three qualify to Final A, remainder to Final B.

===== Semifinal 1 =====
Rank	Rower	Country	Time	Notes
1	Miroslava Knapková	Czech Republic	7:42.57	Q
2	Kim Crow	Australia	7:44.69	Q
3	Ekaterina Karsten	Belarus	7:44.94	Q
4	Yuliya Levina	Russia	7:48.95	
5	Donata Vištartaitė	Lithuania	7:56.05	
6	Marie-Louise Dräger	Germany	8:01.05	

===== Semifinal 2 =====
Rank	Rower	Country	Time	Notes
1	Fie Udby Erichsen	Denmark	7:44.33	Q
2	Zhang Xiuyun	China	7:45.58	Q
3	Emma Twigg	New Zealand	7:46.71	Q
4	Genevra Stone	United States	7:52.98	
5	Frida Svensson	Sweden	7:54.52	
6	Nataliya Mustafayeva	Azerbaijan	8:06.83	

=== Finals ===
==== Final E ====
Rank	Rower	Country	Time	Notes
1	Svetlana Germanovich	Kazakhstan	8:37.08	
2	Amina Rouba	Algeria	8:42.23	
3	Racha Soula	Tunisia	8:49.47	
4	Shwe Zin Latt	Myanmar	8:56.06	

==== Final D ====
Rank	Rower	Country	Time	Notes
1	Kim Ye-ji	South Korea	8:32.57	
2	Gabriela Mosqueira Benitez	Paraguay	8:34.51	
3	Lucia Palermo	Argentina	8:40.38	
4	Debora Oakley Gonzalez	Mexico	8:40.70	
5	Haruna Sakakibara	Japan	8:42.90	
6	Soulmaz Abbasi	Iran	8:57.98	

==== Final C ====
Rank	Rower	Country	Time	Notes
1	Sanita Pušpure	Ireland	7:59.77	
2	Micheen Thornycroft	Zimbabwe	8:07.52	
3	Yariulvis Cobas	Cuba	8:14.59	
4	Camila Vargas Palomo	El Salvador	8:19.75	
5	Phuttharaksa Neegree Rodenburg	Thailand	8:34.11	
–	Kissya da Costa	Brazil		DNS

==== Final B ====
Rank	Rower	Country	Time	Notes
1	Genevra Stone	United States	7:45.24	
2	Donata Vištartaitė	Lithuania	7:47.94	
3	Yuliya Levina	Russia	7:49.22	
4	Frida Svensson	Sweden	7:56.42	
5	Marie-Louise Dräger	Germany	8:11.71	
6	Nataliya Mustafayeva	Azerbaijan	8:23.64	

==== Final A ====
Rank	Rower	Country	Time	Notes
1st place, gold medalist(s)	Miroslava Knapková	Czech Republic	7:54.37	
2nd place, silver medalist(s)	Fie Udby Erichsen	Denmark	7:57.72	
3rd place, bronze medalist(s)	Kim Crow	Australia	7:58.04	
4	Emma Twigg	New Zealand	8:01.76	
5	Ekaterina Karsten	Belarus	8:02.86	
6	Zhang Xiuyun	China	8:03.10	
