= 2003 Asian Rowing Championships =

- Host city: Guangzhou, China
- Dates: 25–28 September 2003
- Main venue: Guangdong International Boating Center

The 2003 Asian Rowing Championships were the 10th Asian Rowing Championships and took place from 25 to 28 September 2003, in Guangdong International Boating Center, Guangzhou, China.

== Medal summary ==
=== Men ===
Event	Gold	Silver	Bronze
Single sculls	Cui Yonghui; China	Yoshimichi Nishimura; Japan	Maeng Chol-ho; North Korea
Double sculls	China; Zhang Peng; Zhou Qiang	Hong Kong; So Sau Wah; Lo Ting Wai	India; Saji Thomas; Harish Chandra
Quadruple sculls	China	Kazakhstan	Japan
Coxless pair	China; Ma Weiguo; Tian Qiqiang	India; Jenil Krishnan; Inderpal Singh	Chinese Taipei
Coxless four	China	South Korea	Chinese Taipei
Eight	China	India	Japan
Lightweight single sculls	Vũ Đăng Tuấn; Vietnam	Xu Yu; China	Jose Rodriguez; Philippines
Lightweight double sculls	China; Xu Yu; Zhu Zhifu	North Korea	Philippines
Lightweight coxless pair	China	Philippines	India
Lightweight coxless four	China	Indonesia	India

=== Women ===
Event	Gold	Silver	Bronze
Single sculls	Huo Ling; China	Chiang Chien-ju; Chinese Taipei	Pere Karoba; Indonesia
Double sculls	China	Japan	North Korea
Quadruple sculls	China	Chinese Taipei	Kazakhstan
Coxless pair	China	Indonesia	Chinese Taipei
Lightweight single sculls	Yu Hua; China	Lee Ka Man; Hong Kong	Liu Yu-hsin; Chinese Taipei
Lightweight double sculls	China; Tan Meiyun; Zhou Weijuan	Vietnam; Phạm Thị Hiền; Mai Thị Dung	Thailand; Bussayamas Phaengkathok; Phuttharaksa Neegree
Lightweight quadruple sculls	China	Hong Kong	Vietnam

== Medal table ==
Rank	Nation	Gold	Silver	Bronze	Total
1	China	16	1	0	17
2	Vietnam	1	1	1	3
3	Hong Kong	0	3	0	3
4	Chinese Taipei	0	2	4	6
5	India	0	2	3	5
6	Japan	0	2	2	4
7	Indonesia	0	2	1	3
8	North Korea	0	1	2	3
8	Philippines	0	1	2	3
10	Kazakhstan	0	1	1	2
11	South Korea	0	1	0	1
12	Thailand	0	0	1	1
Totals (12 entries)		17	17	17	51
