= Uruguay at the 1932 Summer Olympics =

- IOC code: URU
- NOC: Uruguayan Olympic Committee

in Los Angeles
- Competitors: 2 in 2 sports
- Flag bearer: Guillermo Douglas
- Medals Ranked 26th: Gold 0 Silver 0 Bronze 1 Total 1

Summer Olympics appearances (overview)
- 1924; 1928; 1932; 1936; 1948; 1952; 1956; 1960; 1964; 1968; 1972; 1976; 1980; 1984; 1988; 1992; 1996; 2000; 2004; 2008; 2012; 2016; 2020; 2024

Uruguay competed at the 1932 Summer Olympics in Los Angeles, United States from 30 July to 14 August 1932. This was the country's third appearance at the Summer Olympics, after its debut at the 1924. The Uruguayan delegation consisted of two athletes competing in two sports. Guillermo Douglas was the country's flagbearer during the opening ceremony, who won the country's only medal, a bronze in the Games.

== Background ==
The Uruguayan Olympic Committee was formed on 27 October 1923 and recognized by the International Olympic Committee (IOC) in the same year. Uruguay first competed at the Summer Olympics in the 1924 Summer Olympics, and the 1932 Summer Olympics was the country's third consecutive appearance at the Summer Olympics.

The 1932 Summer Olympics was held in Los Angeles, United States from 30 July to 14 August 1932. Rower Guillermo Douglas was Uruguay's flagbearer during the opening ceremony.

== Medalists ==
Uruguay won a single bronze medal, which was won by Douglas in the rowing event at the Games.

Medal	Name	Sport	Event
Bronze	Guillermo Douglas	Rowing	Men's single sculls

== Competitors ==
The Uruguayan team consisted of a single athlete competing in a single sport.

Sport	Men	Women	Total
Art competitions	1	0	1
Rowing	1	0	1
Total	2	0	2

== Art competitions ==
Uruguay had one participant, Pedro Figari, representing the country at the painting event in the Art competitions. This was Uruguay's debut and only participation in the painting event at the Summer Olympics.

Figari, a lawyer by profession, studied art in Europe. He was a journalist for the newspaper El Deber in 1893, and became an elected member of the General Assembly of Uruguay in 1896. In 1898, he was appointed as the Secretary of the Presidency of Uruguay, and later held several positions in the government. He served as the vice president of the Uruguayan Academy of Arts, and was appointed as the advisor to the Minister for Arts and Education in Uruguay later. He specialized in oil paintings.

The painting event was held at the Los Angeles Museum of History in Los Angeles, California. Figari exhibited five paintings– Bull Fight, Going to Races, Traveling, Amazon, and Country Races, at the competition.

Athlete	Event	Category	Title	Rank
Pedro Figari	Painting	Prints	Bull Fight, Going to Races, Traveling, Amazon, Country Races	AC

== Rowing ==
Uruguay qualified one athlete for the rowing event with Douglas representing the country at the event. This was Uruguay's debut in the rowing event at the Summer Olympics. Douglas was born on 24 October 1909 in Paysandú. He began his rowing career in 1924 as a 15-year old, and started taking part in local rowing competitions. He later trained at the Uruguayan capital of Montevideo, and won the singe sculls event at the first South American Rowing Championship held in Montevideo in 1931.

The men's single sculls event was held at the Long Beach Marine Stadium in Long Beach, California between 9 and 13 February. In the event, Douglas finished second out of the three participants in the second heat with a time of 7:45 minutes and qualified for the repechage rounds. In the second repechage round, he finished second amongst the three participants, and qualified for the final. In the final, he finished third with a time of 8:13.6 minutes, and won the bronze medal. He finished 29.8 seconds behind eventual winner Bobby Pearce of Australia. Douglas was the first individual Olympic medal winner from Uruguay after the previous two gold medals came from the football events in 1924 and 1928. He was awarded a gold medal by the Montevideo Rowing in lieu of his Olympic achievement.

Men

Athlete	Event	Heats		Repechage		Final	
Athlete	Event	Time	Rank	Time	Rank	Time	Rank
Guillermo Douglas	Single sculls	7:45.0	2 R	8:20.2	2 Q	8:13.6	Bronze medal
