= Princess Royal Challenge Cup =

Rowing competition

- Venue: Henley Royal Regatta, River Thames
- Location: Henley-on-Thames, Oxfordshire
- Dates: 1993 – present

The Princess Royal Challenge Cup is a rowing event for women's single sculls at the annual Henley Royal Regatta on the River Thames at Henley-on-Thames in England. It is open to all eligible female scullers.

== History ==
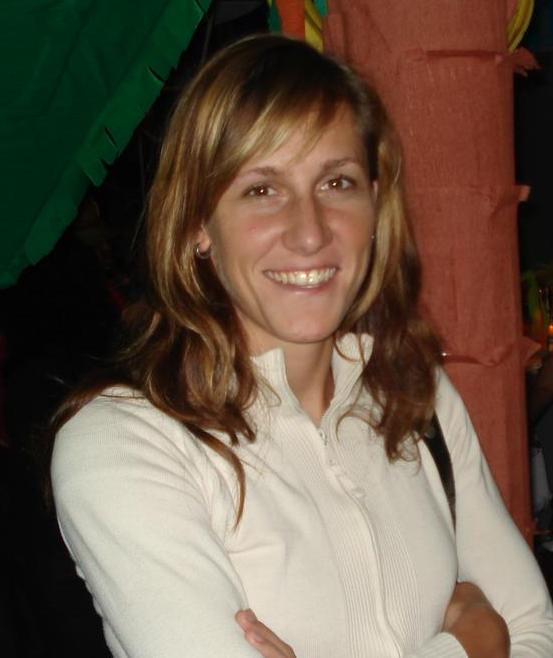
Miroslava Knapková, five-times winner

In 1982 an invitation exhibition event for women's singles was added to the race programme. The start for this event was moved to Fawley so that the course was closer to 1000 m. As the intermediate start installations were required for the shorter distance, the races had to take place during intervals in the normal racing programme (the lunch or tea breaks) which meant that only the dedicated stayed to watch.

In the end, the final of the Women's Invitation Single was a highlight of the regatta, with Beryl Mitchell of Thames Tradesmen's Rowing Club (World Silver medallist in 1981) beating Stephanie Foster of Waiariki Rowing Club, New Zealand (World Bronze medallist in 1982) by one length.

Women's singles disappeared off the race programme until 1993 when an open Women's Single Sculls event, over the full course, was introduced. From 1993 to 1996 this counted as a round of the FISA World Cup.

The first winner was Maria Brandin of Sweden and she subsequently won a further four times. In 1996, the Stewards purchased a silver cup as a challenge trophy and named it the Princess Royal Challenge Cup; it was presented for the first time in 1997.

== Winners ==
=== As Invitation Single Sculls ===
Invitation Single Sculls (Women's 1x)
Year	Winner	Club	Runner-up	Club	ref
1982	Beryl Mitchell	Thames Tradesmen's Rowing Club	Stephanie Foster	Waiariki RC, NZL	

=== As Princess Royal Challenge Cup ===
Princess Royal Challenge Cup (Women's Open 1x)
Year	Winner	Club	Runner-up	Club	ref
1993	Maria Brandin	Kungalv Roddklubb, SWE	Annelies Bredael	Trim-en RC, BEL	
1994	Marnie McBean	Western Middlesex RC, CAN	Kathrin Boron	Potsdam, GER	
1995	Maria Brandin	Kungalv Roddklubb, SWE	Silken Laumann	Victoria City, CAN	
1996	Maria Brandin	Kungalv Roddklubb, SWE	Carolina Lüthi	Reuss, Lucerne, SWI	
1997	Maria Brandin	Kungalv Roddklubb, SWE	Guin Batten	Thames Rowing Club	
1998	Maria Brandin	Kungalv Roddklubb, SWE	Georgina Douglas	Mercantile Rowing Club, AUS	
1999	Katrin Rutschow-Stomporowski	RC Wannsee Berlin, GER	Maria Brandin	Kungalv Roddklubb, SWE	
2000	Debbie Flood	Tideway Scullers School	Maria Brandin	Leander Club	
2001	Ekaterina Karsten	Minsk City Club, BLR	Katrin Rutschow-Stomporowski	RaW Berlin e.V	
2002	Rumyana Neykova	Club Academic, BUL	Katrin Rutschow-Stomporowski	RaW Berlin e.V	
2003	Catriona Oliver	Australian Institute of Sport, AUS	Donna Martin	Black Mountain RC, AUS	
2004	Cindy Bishop	Riverside Boat Club, USA	Rika Geyser	Trident RC, RSA	
2005	Rumyana Neykova	Cherno More Club, BUL	Fiona Milne	Melbourne University, AUS	
2006	Sophie Balmary	Club France, FRA	Marit van Eupen	Hollandia Roeiclub, NED	
2007	Michelle Guerette	Radcliffe Crew, Harvard University, USA	Jen Goldsack	Wallingford Rowing Club	
2008	Caroline Ryan	Garda Siochana Boat Club, IRL	Matilda Pauls	Imperial College Boat Club	
2009	Emma Twigg	Hawkes Bay Rowing Club, NZL	Genevra Stone	Cambridge Boat Club, USA	
2010	Miroslava Knapková	V.K. Slavia Praha, CZE	Genevra Stone	Cambridge Boat Club, USA	
2011	Miroslava Knapková	V.K. Slavia Praha, CZE	Genevra Stone	Cambridge Boat Club, USA	
2012	Isolda Penney	Kingston Rowing Club, CAN	Kaisa Pajusalu	RC Kalev, EST	
2013	Miroslava Knapková	V.K. Slavia Praha, CZE	Emma Twigg	Waiariki Rowing Club, NZL	
2014	Miroslava Knapková	V.K. Slavia Praha, CZE	Krisztina Gyimes	Danubius Nemzeti Hajos Egylet, HUN	
2015	Miroslava Knapková	V.K. Slavia Praha, CZE	Lisa Scheenaard	Hollandia Roeiclub, NED	
2016	Lisa Scheenaard	Hollandia Roeiclub, NED	Anne Beenken	Ruderverein Saarbrücken e.V, GER	
2017	Annekatrin Thiele	SC DHfK Leipzig e.V., GER	Victoria Thornley	Leander Club	
2018	Jeannine Gmelin	RC Uster, SUI	Madeleine Edmunds	Georgina Hope Reinhart NTC, AUS	
2019	Emma Twigg	Hawkes Bay, NZL	Lisa Scheenaard	Hollandia Roeiclub, NED	
2020	No competition due to COVID-19 pandemic				
2021	Lola Anderson	Leander Club	Lauren Henry	Leicester Rowing Club	
2022	Kara Kohler	Texas Rowing Center, USA	Imogen Grant	Cambridge University Boat Club	
2023	Diana Dymchenko	Rowing Club Baku, Azerbaijan	Marta Wieliczko	Wisla, Poland	
2024	Liu Ruiqi	Shanghai Jiao Tong Univ, China	Cicely Madden	Cambridge Boat Club, U.S.A.	
2025	Lauren Henry	Leicester Rowing Club	Frida Sanggaard Nielsen	Bagsværd Roklub, Denmark	

=== Gallery ===
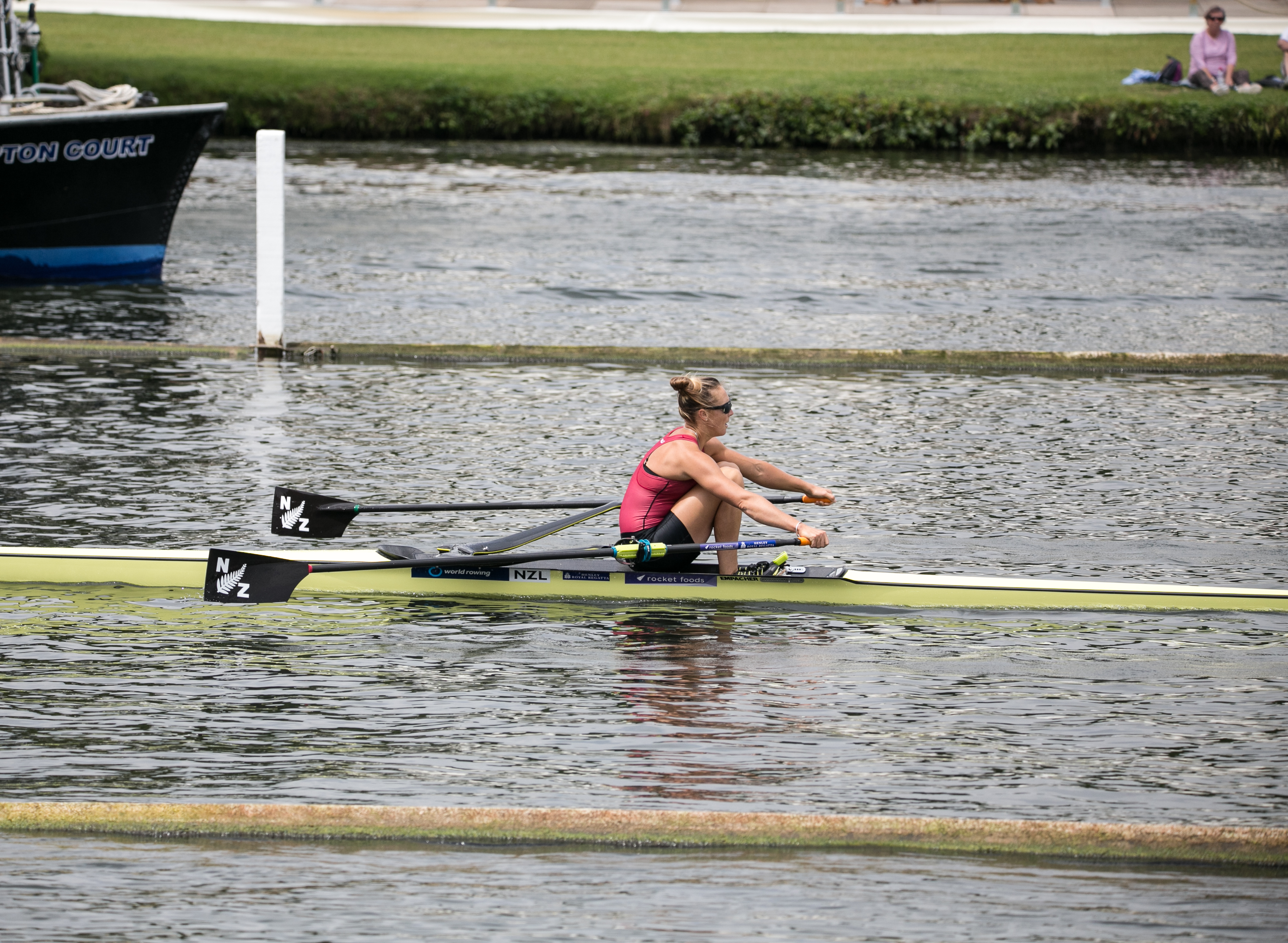
Emma Twigg at Henley during 2019 wins for a second time
