= Li Qin =

Li Qin may refer to:

- Li Qin (rower) (born 1981), female Chinese rower
- Li Qin (actress) (born 1990), Chinese actress and singer

== See also ==
- Qin Yan, originally named Qin Li
