= Nataliya Mustafayeva =

Ukrainian-born Azerbaijani rower (born 1985)

Nataliya Vitaliïvna Lialchuk-Mustafeyeva (born 11 August 1985 in Rivne, Ukrainian SSR, Soviet Union) is a Ukrainian-born Azerbaijani rower who formerly competed for Ukraine. She finished 4th in the women's quadruple sculls at the 2008 Summer Olympics, where she represented Ukraine. She competed for Azerbaijan in the single sculls race at the 2012 Summer Olympics and placed 6th in Final B and 12th overall.
