= Débora Oakley =

Mexican rower (born 1980)

Personal information
- Born: 11 August 1980 (age 44); Mexico City, Mexico

Sport
- Sport: Rowing

Débora Oakley González (born 11 August 1980) is a Mexican rower. She competed in the single sculls race at the 2012 Summer Olympics and placed 4th in Final D and 22nd overall.
