= Racha Soula =

Tunisian rower

Racha Soula (born 16 February 1994 in La Goulette) is a Tunisian rower. She competed in the single sculls race at the 2012 Summer Olympics and placed 3rd in Final E and 27th overall.
