= Pippa Savage =

Australian rower

Personal information
- Full name: Philippa Savage
- Born: 15 March 1981 (age 44); Moree, New South Wales, Australia

Sport
- Country: Australia
- Sport: Rowing

Philippa "Pippa" Savage (born 15 March 1981 in Moree, New South Wales, Australia) is an Australian rower. She competed in the women's single sculls at the 2008 Summer Olympics. She did not compete at the 2012 Summer Olympics.
