= Rowing at the 1932 Summer Olympics – Men's single sculls =

Olympic rowing event

Men's single sculls at the Games of the X Olympiad
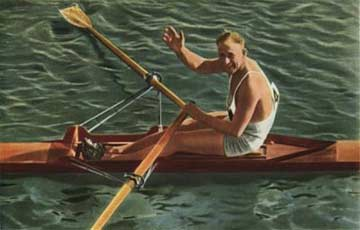
- Gold medalist Bobby Pearce
- Venue: Long Beach Marine Stadium
- Date: August 9–13, 1932
- Competitors: 5 from 5 nations
- Winning time: 7:44.4

Medalists
1st place, gold medalist(s)		Bobby Pearce	Australia
2nd place, silver medalist(s)		William Miller	United States
3rd place, bronze medalist(s)		Guillermo Douglas	Uruguay

The men's single sculls competition at the 1932 Summer Olympics in Los Angeles took place at the Long Beach Marine Stadium from 9 to 13 August. There were 5 competitors from 5 nations, with each nation limited to one boat in the event. The event was won by defending champion Bobby Pearce of Australia, the first man to successfully defend an Olympic title in the event and second to win multiple medals overall. Silver went to William Miller of the United States; it was the third consecutive Games in which an American was the runner-up. The United States' podium streak in the event extended to four Games; the nation had won a medal in each of the five times it had appeared. Guillermo Douglas gave Uruguay a bronze medal in its debut in the event. Dick Southwood of Great Britain took fourth place, snapping that nation's five-Games medal streak and marking the first time Great Britain had competed and not won a medal. The only rower not to advance to the final was Canadian Joseph Wright Jr., who finished in fifth place.

== Background ==
This was the eighth appearance of the event. Rowing had been on the programme in 1896 but was cancelled due to bad weather. The single sculls has been held every time that rowing has been contested, beginning in 1900.

Two of the 15 rowers from the 1928 Games returned: gold medalist Bobby Pearce of Australia and fifth-place finisher Joseph Wright Jr. of Canada. American William Miller had earned silver in the coxed four in 1928. Pearce, in addition to his Olympic title, had also won the 1930 British Empire Games and the 1931 Diamond Challenge Sculls; he was favored to repeat. A notable absence was Herbert Buhtz of Germany, the 1932 Diamond Challenge winner, who was will and did not compete in this event (but did compete in the double sculls, earning a silver medal).

Uruguay made its debut in the event. Great Britain made its seventh appearance, most among nations, having missed only the 1904 Games in St. Louis.

== Competition format ==
This rowing event is a single scull event, meaning that each boat is propelled by a single rower. The "scull" portion means that the rower uses two oars, one on each side of the boat. The competition consists of multiple rounds.

During the first round two semifinal heats were held. The first boat in each heat advanced to the final, while all others were relegated to the repechages.

The repechages were rounds which offered rowers a chance to qualify for the final. The first two boats in the repechage heat advanced to the final.

== Schedule ==
Date	Time	Round
Tuesday, August 9, 1932	9:00	Semifinals
Thursday, August 11, 1932	9:00	Repechage
Saturday, August 13, 1932	15:00	Final

== Results ==
=== Semifinals ===
First boat of each heat qualifies to the final, remainder goes to the repechage.

==== Semifinal 1 ====
Rank	Rower	Nation	Time	Notes
1	Bobby Pearce	Australia	7:27.0	Q
2	William Miller	United States	7:29.2	R

==== Semifinal 2 ====
Rank	Rower	Nation	Time	Notes
1	Dick Southwood	Great Britain	7:42.6	Q
2	Guillermo Douglas	Uruguay	7:45.0	R
3	Joseph Wright Jr.	Canada	8:30.6	R

=== Repechage ===
First two qualify to the final.

Rank	Rower	Nation	Time	Notes
1	William Miller	United States	8:05.8	Q
2	Guillermo Douglas	Uruguay	8:20.2	Q
3	Joseph Wright Jr.	Canada	8:37.8	

=== Final ===
Rank	Rower	Nation	Time
1st place, gold medalist(s)	Bobby Pearce	Australia	7:44.4
2nd place, silver medalist(s)	William Miller	United States	7:45.2
3rd place, bronze medalist(s)	Guillermo Douglas	Uruguay	8:13.6
4	Dick Southwood	Great Britain	8:33.6

== Results summary ==
Rank	Rower	Nation	Semifinals	Repechage	Final
1st place, gold medalist(s)	Bobby Pearce	Australia	7:27.0	Bye	7:44.4
2nd place, silver medalist(s)	William Miller	United States	7:29.2	8:05.8	7:45.2
3rd place, bronze medalist(s)	Guillermo Douglas	Uruguay	7:45.0	8:20.2	8:13.6
4	Dick Southwood	Great Britain	7:42.6	Bye	8:33.6
5	Joseph Wright Jr.	Canada	8:30.6	8:37.8	Did not advance
