= Jennifer Devine =

American rower

Personal information
- Born: December 19, 1968 (age 57) Portland, Oregon, U.S.

Sport
- Country: United States
- Sport: Rowing

Jennifer Devine (born December 19, 1968) is an American rower. She competed at the 2004 Summer Olympics in Athens, in the women's single sculls. Devine was born in Portland, Oregon.
