= Michelle Guerette =

American rower (born 1980)

Personal information
- Born: October 6, 1980 (age 45) Hartford, Connecticut, U.S.
Medal record
Women's rowing
Representing United States
Olympic Games
Silver medal – second place	2008 Beijing	Single Sculls

Michelle Guerette (born October 6, 1980) is an American rower, who competed in two Olympic Games.

== Biography ==
Guerette born in Hartford, Connecticut and raised in Bristol, Connecticut, graduated from Harvard University in 2002. She competed in the women's quadruple sculls event at the 2004 Summer Olympics in Athens, Greece. After competing in the 2004 Olympics, she embarked on a solo career, and was the first pick for the U.S. team at the 2005 World Rowing Championships in Gifu, Japan, at which she placed third in the women's single sculls.

The next year she placed fifth at the 2006 World Championships in Dorney Lake, England. She finished third again in 2007 in Munich, Germany.

In 2007 Guerette won the Princess Royal Challenge Cup (the premier women's singles sculls event) at the Henley Royal Regatta, rowing for the Radcliffe Crew, Harvard University.

At the 2008 Olympic Games in Beijing, Guerette earned a silver medal in women's single sculls, finishing less than half a second behind the winner, Rumyana Neykova.
