= Mu Suli =

Chinese rower

Personal information
- Nationality: Chinese
- Born: 7 January 1983 (age 43) Fugou County, Zhoukou, Henan Province, China

Sport
- Sport: Rowing

Mu Suli (穆素丽, born 7 January 1983) is a Chinese rower. She came fourth in rowing eight at the 2006 World Rowing Championships. She came 13th in single sculls at the 2004 Olympics.

Mu was born in Fugou County, Zhoukou, Henan Province. Water sport was a strong sport in the Zhoukou area. Zhilei Zhang, the future WBO heavyweight interim champion born the same year in Shenqiu County, Zhoukou, practiced canoeing until 1998.
