= Maria Brandin =

Swedish rower

Personal information
- Born: 4 September 1963 (age 62) Kungälv, Västra Götaland, Sweden

Sport
- Sport: Rowing
- Event: single scull
- Club: Kungalv Roddklubb
Medal record
Women's rowing
Representing Sweden
World Rowing Championships
Gold medal – first place	1995 Tampere	W1x
Bronze medal – third place	1997 Aiguebelette	W1x
Bronze medal – third place	1998 Cologne	W1x

Maria Helene Brandin (born 4 September 1963 in Kungälv) is a former Swedish rower, who competed in four Olympic Games.

== Biography ==
Brandin competed in four Olympic Games from 1988 to 2002 respectively

Brandin is a five-time winner of the Princess Royal Challenge Cup (the premier women's singles sculls event) at the Henley Royal Regatta, while rowing for the Kungalv Roddklubb from 1993 to 1998. The five successes is a record number of wins and was equalled in 2015, by Czech rower Miroslava Knapková.
