= Analía Marín =

Argentine rower

Personal information
- Full name: Analía Viviana Marín
- Born: 4 May 1983 (age 41); Buenos Aires, Argentina

Sport
- Sport: Rowing

Analía Viviana Marín (born 4 May 1983) is an Argentine rower. She competed in the women's single sculls event at the 2004 Summer Olympics.
