= Tian Liang (rower) =

Chinese rower

Tian Liang (Chinese: 田靓; pinyin: Tián Liàng; born 4 February 1986 in Mohe, Daxing'anling, Heilongjiang) is a female Chinese rower, who competed in the women's double sculls for the Chinese team at the 2008 Summer Olympics with team-mate Li Qin. They finished in 4th place. At the 2012 Summer Olympics, she was part of the Chinese women's quadruple sculls team that finishing in 5th place.

She and Li Qin were World Champions in the double sculls in 2007.

== Major performances ==
- 2005 National Games – 1st fours;
- 2007 World Cup Austria – 1st double sculls;
- 2007 World Cup Netherlands – 1st double sculls;
- 2007 World Championships – 1st double sculls;
- 2008 World Cup Lucerne – 1st double sculls
