= Lee Yun-hui (rower) =

South Korean rower

Personal information
- Nationality: South Korean
- Born: 5 September 1986 (age 38); Chungcheongbuk, South Korea

Sport
- Sport: Rowing

Lee Yun-hui (born 5 September 1986) is a South Korean rower. She competed in the women's single sculls event at the 2004 Summer Olympics.
