= Rika Geyser =

South African rower

Personal information
- Nationality: South African
- Born: 28 August 1978 (age 46); Pretoria, South Africa

Sport
- Sport: Rowing

Adriana Hendrika Geyser (born 28 August 1978) is a South African rower. She competed in the women's single sculls event at the 2008 Summer Olympics.
