= Sophie Balmary =

French rower (born 1979)

Personal information
- Nationality: French
- Born: 28 May 1979 (age 46) Cahors, France

Sport
- Sport: Rowing
- Club: Club France

Sophie Balmary (born 28 May 1979) is a French rower. She competed at the 2000 Summer Olympics, 2004 Summer Olympics and the 2008 Summer Olympics.

In 2006, Balmary won the Princess Royal Challenge Cup (the premier women's singles sculls event) at the Henley Royal Regatta, rowing for Club France.
