= Kissya Cataldo =

Brazilian rower

Kissya Cataldo da Costa is a Brazilian former rower. In 2012 she tested positive for the drug EPO and was disqualified at the 2012 Summer Olympic Games in London. She won 2014–2015 Brazilian Rowing Championship w1x class.

Cataldo-Da Costa tested positive second time in 2015 by WADA just before Panamerican Games in 2015. She was banned for 4 years.
