= Doaa Moussa =

Egyptian rower

Personal information
- Native name: دعاء موسى
- National team: Egypt
- Born: 1 May 1982 (age 42); Giza, Giza Governorate, Egypt

Sport
- Country: Egypt
- Sport: Rowing
- Updated on 26 July 2017

Doaa Moussa (Arabic: دعاء موسى; born 1 May 1982 in Giza, Giza Governorate, Egypt) is an Egyptian Olympic rower. She represented Egypt in 2004 Summer Olympics in Athena.

== Olympic Participation ==
=== Athena 2004 ===
Rowing – Women's single sculls

Doaa Moussa (EGY)
Round		Time	Rank	Result
Heats	Heat 1	8:26.87	6th	Qualify to Repêchage
Repêchages	Repêchage 1	8:16.57	5th	Qualify to Semifinal
Semifinals	Semifinal 3	8:22.45	6th	Qualify to Final D
Final Round	Final D	8:34.80	6th	
Final Standing: 24th
