= Shin Yeong-eun =

South Korean rower (born 1987)

Personal information
- Nationality: South Korean
- Born: 22 August 1987 (age 39)

Sport
- Sport: Rowing

Shin Yeong-eun (born 22 August 1987) is a South Korean rower. She competed in the women's single sculls event at the 2008 Summer Olympics.
