= Pere Karoba =

Indonesian rower (born 1981)

Personal information
- Nationality: Indonesian
- Born: 9 May 1981 (age 45) Jayapura, Indonesia

Sport
- Sport: Rowing
Medal record
Women's rowing
Representing Indonesia
Asian Games
Bronze medal – third place	2006 Doha	Single sculls
Asian Championships
Bronze medal – third place	2003 Guangzhou	Single sculls

Pere Karoba (born 9 May 1981) is an Indonesian rower. She competed in the women's single sculls event at the 2004 Summer Olympics.
