= Elana Hill =

Zimbabwean rower (born 1988)

Elana Susan Hill (born 28 May 1988 in Harare, Zimbabwe) is a Zimbabwean rower. She represented Zimbabwe at the 2008 Summer Olympics in Beijing, China.

She went to school at Bishopslea Preparatory School and Arundel School in Harare. She excelled in rowing at Arundel School. She is currently studying at the University of Pretoria.

Her best performance to-date was in the sea category at the World Junior Championships in 2006, where she finished 5th.

== See also ==
- Zimbabwe at the 2008 Summer Olympics
