= Rumyana Neykova =

Bulgarian rower (born 1973)

Personal information
- Born: 6 April 1973 (age 53) Sofia

Sport
- Sport: Rowing
- Club: Club Academic; Cherno More Club
Medal record
Women's rowing
Representing Bulgaria
Olympic Games
Gold medal – first place	2008 Beijing	Single sculls
Silver medal – second place	2000 Sydney	Single sculls
Bronze medal – third place	2004 Athens	Single sculls
World Championships
Gold medal – first place	2002 Seville	Single sculls
Gold medal – first place	2003 Milan	Single sculls
Silver medal – second place	2005 Kaizu	Double sculls
Silver medal – second place	2007 Oberschleißheim	Single sculls
Bronze medal – third place	1999 St. Catharines	Single sculls
Bronze medal – third place	2009 Poznań	Double sculls
World Junior Championships
Gold medal – first place	1991 Banyoles	Single sculls
Silver medal – second place	1990 Aiguebelette-le-lac	Single sculls
European Championships
Gold medal – first place	2007 Poznań	Single sculls

Rumyana Neykova (Bulgarian: Румяна Нейкова; born 6 April 1973 in Sofia) is a Bulgarian rower, who competed at five Olympic Games.

== Biography ==
Neykova competed at the 1992 Summer Olympics, the 1996 Summer Olympics, the 2000 Summer Olympics, where she won silver in the single sculls, the 2004 Summer Olympics, where she won bronze in the single sculls, and the 2008 Summer Olympics, where she won gold in the single sculls. Her current coach is her husband, Svilen Neykov. In 2002, she set the world best time of 7:07:41 in the women's single sculls and was named Bulgarian Sportsperson of the Year (a title she earned again in 2008), as well as FISA Female Rower of the Year. She was also named the BTA Best Balkan Athlete of the Year in 2007.

Neykova has been involved in rowing since 1985, when she began training at CSKA Sofia coached Verka Aleksieva. She won gold in the junior women's single sculls at the 1990 World Junior Championships. After several unsuccessful attempts with double sculls and quadruple sculls, she switched to the single sculls and won her first senior medal at the 1999 World Championships. She has two world titles in that discipline; in 2002 and 2003. At the 2005 World Championships, she competed in the double sculls, finishing second with Miglena Markova.

At the 2000 Summer Olympics, she narrowly lost the Olympic title to Ekaterina Karsten of Belarus by photo finish. After the Olympics, she took a one-year break, giving birth to her son, Emil Neykov, who has also become a successful rower.

In 2002, Neykova won the Princess Royal Challenge Cup (the premier women's singles sculls event) at the Henley Royal Regatta, rowing for the Club Academic and defeating Katrin Rutschow-Stomporowski. At the 2004 Summer Olympics, she finished third in the single sculls. In 2005, she won a second Princess Royal Challenge Cup but rowing for the Cherno More Club this time.

Neykova won her first Olympic title at the 2008 Summer Olympics.

It feels really great. I owe everything to my husband (also coach) and my family who have supported and believed in me.

— Neykova after winning the Olympic title in the women's single sculls at the 2008 Summer Olympics
