= Yuliya Levina =

Russian rower

Medal record

Representing Russia

Olympic Games

Women's Rowing
Bronze medal – third place	2000 Sydney	quadruple sculls

Yuliya Aleksandrovna Levina (Russian: Юлия Александровна Левина; born 2 January 1973, in Saratov) is a Russian rower who competed for Russia in four Summer Olympics.

In 2000, she was a crew member of the Russia boat which won the bronze medal in the quadruple sculls event.
