= Gabriella Bascelli =

Italian rower

Personal information
- Nationality: Italian
- Born: 19 August 1982 (age 42); Johannesburg, South Africa

Sport
- Sport: Rowing

Gabriella Bascelli (born 19 August 1982) is an Italian rower. She competed at the 2004 Summer Olympics and the 2008 Summer Olympics.
