= Bobby Pearce (rower) =

Australian rower (1905–1976)

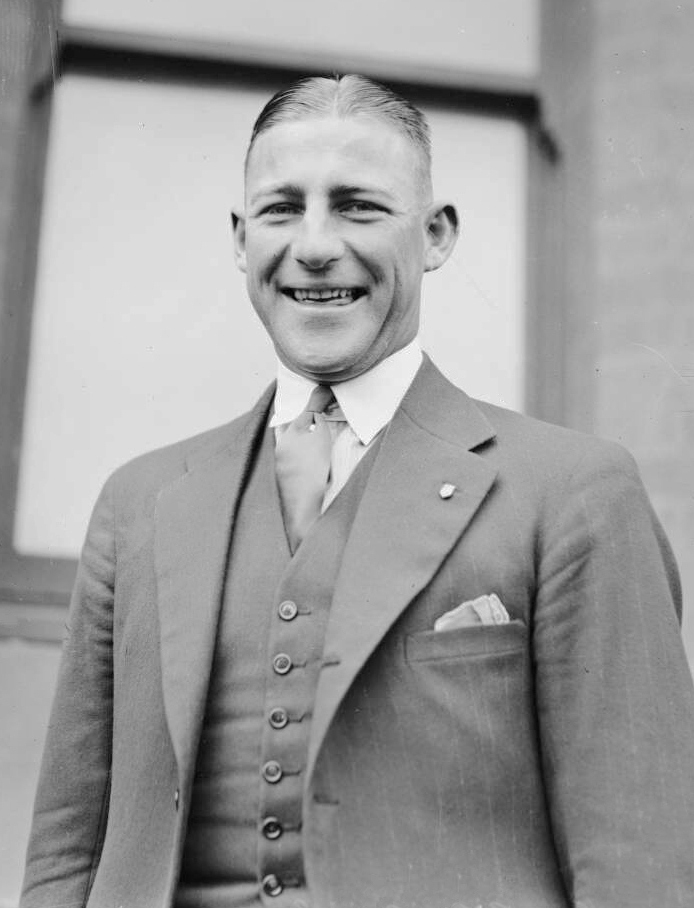
- Pearce in the 1930s

Personal information
- Nationality: Australian; Canadian
- Born: Henry Robert Pearce; 30 September 1905 Double Bay, New South Wales, Australia
- Died: 20 May 1976 (aged 70) Toronto, Ontario, Canada
- Height: 188 cm (6 ft 2 in)
- Weight: 92 kg (203 lb)

Sport
- Sport: Rowing
- Club: Sydney Rowing Club
Medal record
Representing Australia
Olympic Games
Gold medal – first place	1928 Amsterdam	Single sculls
Gold medal – first place	1932 Los Angeles	Single sculls
British Empire Games
Gold medal – first place	1930 Hamilton	Single sculls
Diamond Challenge Sculls
Gold medal – first place	1931 Henley-on-Thames	Single sculls
Gold Cup Challenge
Gold medal – first place	1928 Philadelphia	Single sculls

Henry Robert Pearce (30 September 1905 – 20 May 1976) was an Australian three-time world champion sculler of the 1920s and 1930s. He won consecutive Olympic gold medals in the single sculls at the 1928 Summer Olympics in Amsterdam and the 1932 Summer Olympics in Los Angeles. He won the World Sculling Championship in 1933, and twice successfully defended that title in 1934 and 1938. He was a three-time Australian national champion and won the Diamond Sculls at the 1931 Henley Royal Regatta.

== Early life and sporting pedigree ==
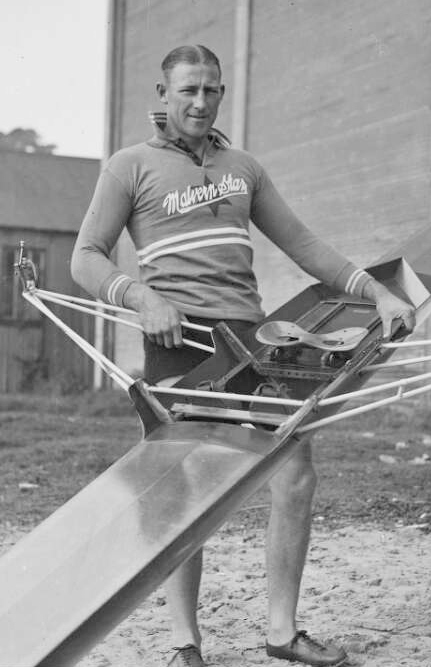
Pearce in the 1930s

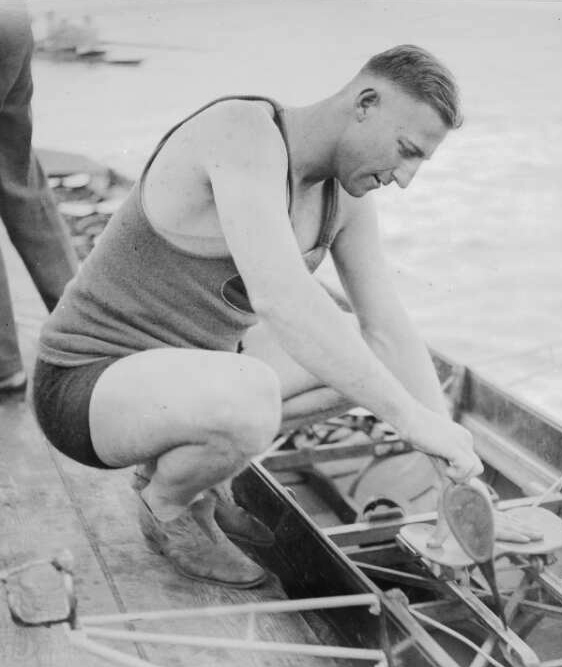
Pearce oiling his scull in the 1930s

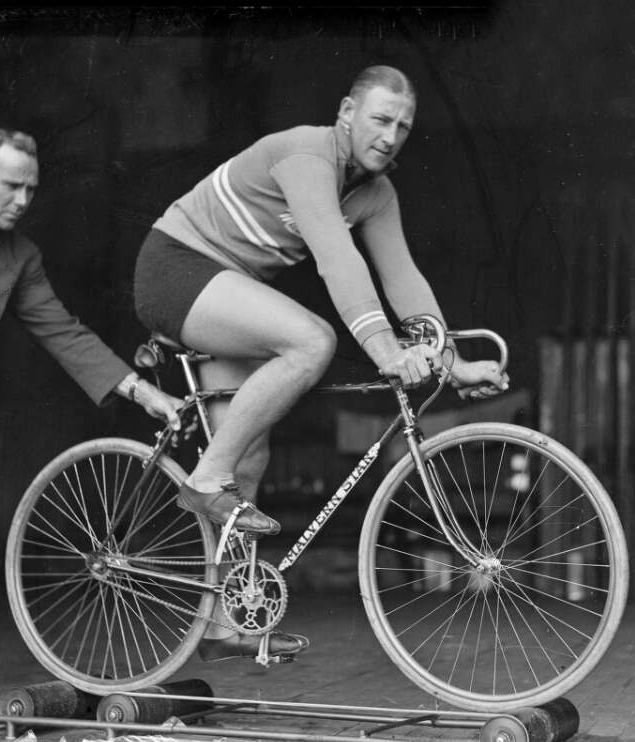
Pearce training on a bicycle in 1930

Pearce was born in Sydney, Australia, into a family with an extraordinary sporting pedigree. His great-grandfather emigrated from England in 1850 and settled in Double Bay where he worked as a fisherman and ran a boatshed. Pearce's grandfather Henry John "Harry" Pearce, Sr. was an Australian champion in sculling. Harry Pearce had five sons and seven daughters.

Pearce's father, Henry J "Harry, Jr" Pearce Jr., was an Australian sculling champion and challenged for the world championship twice (in 1911 and 1913), losing to Richard Arnst (New Zealand) and Ernest Barry (Great Britain) respectively. Pearce's aunt Florence Chamberlain was a New South Wales swimming champion and his uncle Sandy Pearce, was a national rugby league representative inducted into that sport's Australian Hall of Fame. Sandy's sons (Bobby's cousins) were Cecil a sculler, who represented for Australia at the 1936 Summer Olympics and Sid Pearce who also played rugby league for Australia. Cecil's son Gary Pearce would row in three Olympic games from 1964 to 1972.

== Sculling career ==
Pearce entered a U-16 handicap race at the age of six, managing to finish second. Pearce left school early to become a carpenter, and then worked in the fishing industry with his father. He joined the Australian Army in 1923, and attained the rank of Staff Sergeant. In 1926, after winning the Army heavyweight boxing championship, he left the army to become a full-time rower. He was a competitor for the Sydney Rowing Club.

Standing at 188 cm and 95 kg, Pearce entered the amateur national sculling championships in 1927, which he won and retained in 1928 and 1929. This gained him selection for the Olympics in 1928, where he was the only rower selected. At the games, he carried the Australian flag at the opening ceremony.

Pearce won all of his races with relative ease. He defeated his first opponent Walter Flinsch of Germany by 12 lengths and his second opponent Danish rower Schwartz by 8 lengths. In the quarter-final he was easily beating French opponent Saurin when a family of ducks strayed into his lane. Pearce momentarily stopped rowing to let the ducks pass; he still won with the fastest time of all 8 competitors in that round. In the semifinals, Pearce was pressed by David Collett of Great Britain, winning by three-quarters of a length (roughly 1.5 seconds). In the finals he became the first Australian to win gold in the single sculls by defeating Kenneth Myers of the United States by 9.8 seconds. In winning he established a new Olympic record, some 25 seconds faster than the previous mark. This also earned him the Philadelphia Gold Cup, which represented the amateur champion of the world. He was awarded an Honorary Life Membership of the Sydney Rowing Club.

In preparation for the 1928 Olympics, Pearce attempted to enter the Diamond Sculls at the Henley Royal Regatta, but was barred as he was a carpenter by trade: the rule relating to amateur status then in force barred anyone "Who is or has been by trade or employment for wages a mechanic, artisan or labourer." This socially discriminatory wording was deleted in 1937.

Pearce was unemployed during the Great Depression, only entering the 1930 British Empire Games in Hamilton, Ontario, through the charity of friends. He won the single sculls at the Empire Games and attracted the attention of whisky magnate Lord Dewar, who offered Pearce a job in Hamilton as a salesman. This made Pearce eligible to compete in the Diamond Sculls at the Henley regatta and he entered again in 1931.

In the first round at Henley he was against Tom Brocklebank, who had served as stroke of Cambridge University Boat Club in the Boat Race. Pearce had a weight advantage of three and a half stone (22 kg) over Brocklebank and was a clear favourite. Having taken an early lead Pearce was content to scull a couple of lengths in front until halfway along the enclosures (in the last 500m of the course) where Brocklebank pushed hard and came back level. Pearce countered, but only just in time. C. T. Steward commented in the Henley Records that 'Pearce won comfortably by half a length'. However, Dickie Burnell, who watched the race as a schoolboy from the Stewards' box on the finish line, wrote that Pearce looked anything but comfortable in the last few strokes. Pearce had no such trouble in later rounds and won the final against F. Bradley of Pembroke College, Cambridge, by six lengths.

Pearce defended his Olympic title in 1932, this time winning by 1.1 seconds over American William Miller. The remainder of the field trailed by nearly 30 seconds. Although he was a Canadian resident, Olympic rules required that he represent Australia.

== World champion professional ==
Pearce turned professional the following year, making himself ineligible for further Olympic competition. He won the World Championship in Toronto in a 1933 race against Ted Phelps of England. He thrashed Phelps, the then world champion by 274 metres on Lake Ontario in an astonishing performance before 30,000 spectators. In 1934 in London he defended his Title against WG Miller of the USA. In 1938, he defeated Evans Paddon of Australia in a three-mile race during the Canadian National Exhibition in Toronto where his world sculling title was at stake. The race took place just a few days after Pearce's wife Reita Hendon died following an illness. Pearce was awarded the Lou Marsh Trophy as Canada's top athlete of 1938 and retired undefeated. For further details of his World Championship races see World Sculling Championship. Shortly afterwards the Second World War put a stop to any title matches and the next one was not until 1948. Pearce was the last international Champion as all subsequent holders were Australian.

In 1939, Pearce became a professional wrestler, performing in preliminary matches for Toronto promoter Frank Tunney until the spring of 1940.

== Later life ==
During World War II, Pearce joined the Royal Canadian Naval Volunteer Reserve, and was made a lieutenant in charge of training new soldiers. He also did public relations work for the Royal Canadian Navy and rose to the rank of lieutenant commander by his retirement in 1956. He then resumed his work as a liquor salesman, and in 1972 became a Canadian citizen. Pearce died in Toronto of heart disease on 20 May 1976 and was buried in Mount Pleasant cemetery. His second wife Velma (née Whelpton), their son and the children of his first marriage survived him. He was inducted into the Canadian Olympic Hall of Fame in 1952, into the Canada's Sports Hall of Fame in 1975, and into the Sport Australia Hall of Fame in 1986.

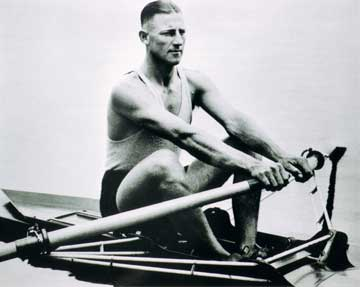
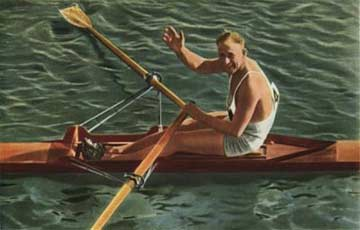
Pearce on the water : left 1928 & right at the 1932 Olympics
