= Ibtissem Trimèche =

Tunisian rower

Personal information
- Nationality: Tunisian
- Born: 2 March 1982 (age 43); Tunis, Tunisia

Sport
- Sport: Rowing

Ibtissem Trimèche (born 2 March 1982) is a Tunisian rower. She competed at the 2000 Summer Olympics and the 2004 Summer Olympics.
