= Katrin Rutschow-Stomporowski =

German rower (born 1975)

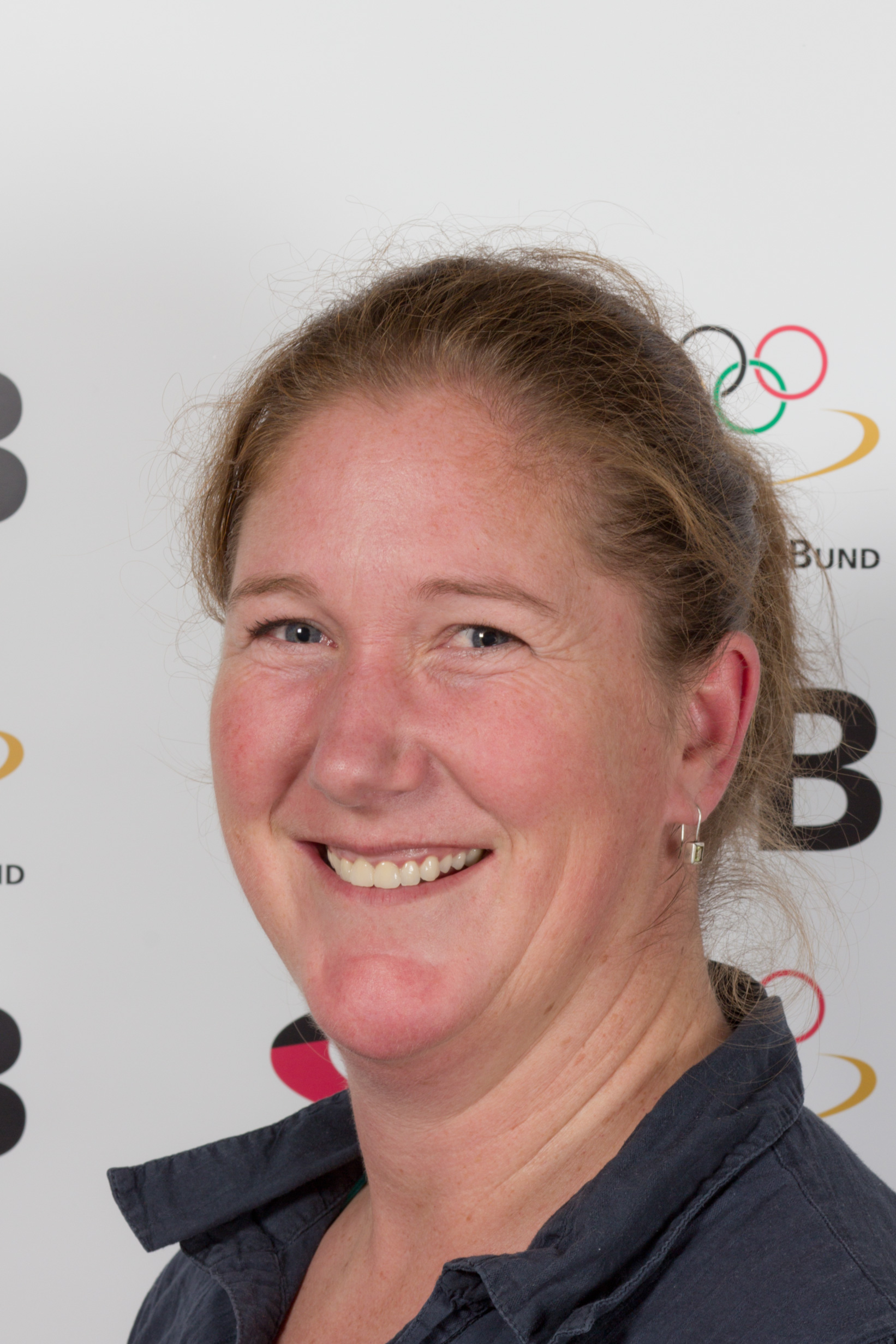
- Rutschow-Stomporowski in 2012

Medal record

Women's rowing

Representing Germany

Olympic Games
Gold medal – first place	1996 Atlanta	Quad sculls
Gold medal – first place	2004 Athens	Single sculls
Bronze medal – third place	2000 Sydney	Single sculls

World Rowing Championships
Gold medal – first place	1994 Indianapolis	Quad Sculls
Gold medal – first place	1995 Tampere	Quad Sculls

Katrin Rutschow-Stomporowski (née Rutschow, born 2 April 1975 in Waren (Müritz)) is a German rower and two-time Olympic gold medalist.

== Biography ==
In both 1994 and 1995 Rutschow won the world championships gold medal in the quadruple sculls and was part of the gold medal winning team that won the Women's quadruple sculls with fellow Germans, Jana Sorgers, Kerstin Köppen and Kathrin Boron.

Rutschow married Bernhard Stomporowski, a lightweight men's world championship medallist, in December 1999 and afterwards competed as Rutschow-Stomporowski.

In 1999, she won the Princess Royal Challenge Cup (the premier women's singles sculls event) at the Henley Royal Regatta, rowing for RC Wannsee Berlin.

Rutschow-Stomporowski won a second Olympic gold medal in the single sculls at the 2004 Olympic Games in Athens, deposing defending champion Ekaterina Karsten.
