= Chiang Chien-ju =

Taiwanese rower (born 1981)

Personal information
- Nationality: Taiwanese
- Born: 24 June 1981 (age 44); Taichung, Taiwan

Sport
- Sport: Rowing

Chiang Chien-ju (born 24 June 1981) is a Taiwanese rower. She competed in the women's single sculls event at the 2004 Summer Olympics.
