= Guillermo Douglas =

Uruguayan rower (1909–1967)

Medal record

Men's rowing

Representing Uruguay

Olympic Games
Bronze medal – third place	1932 Los Angeles	Single sculls

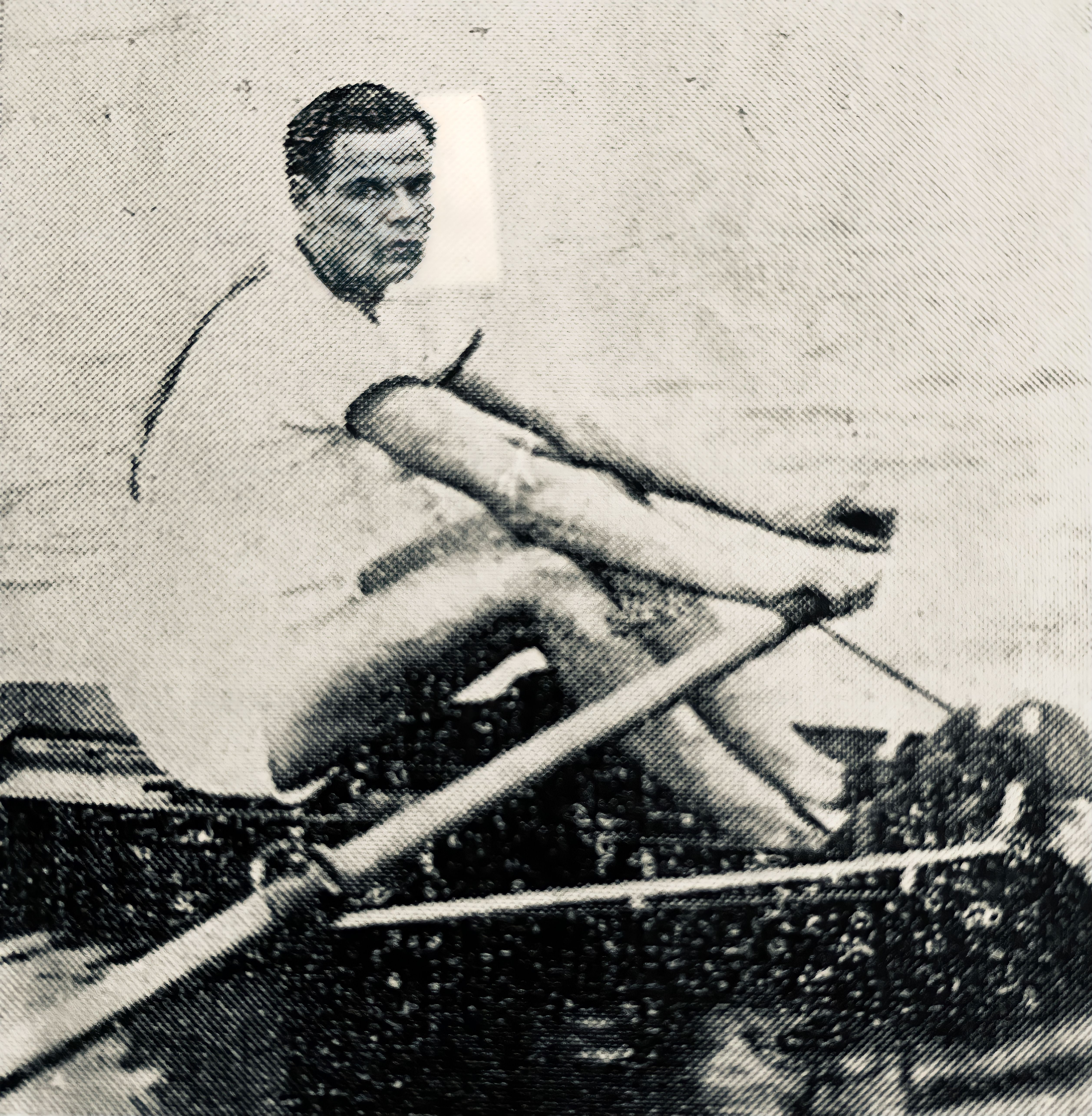
Guillermo Douglas

Guillermo Rafael Douglas Sabattini (24 October 1909 – 1967) was a rower from Uruguay. He was born in Paysandú. He competed for Uruguay in the 1932 Summer Olympics held in Los Angeles, United States in the single sculls event where he finished in third place.
