= Frida Svensson (rower) =

Swedish professional sculler

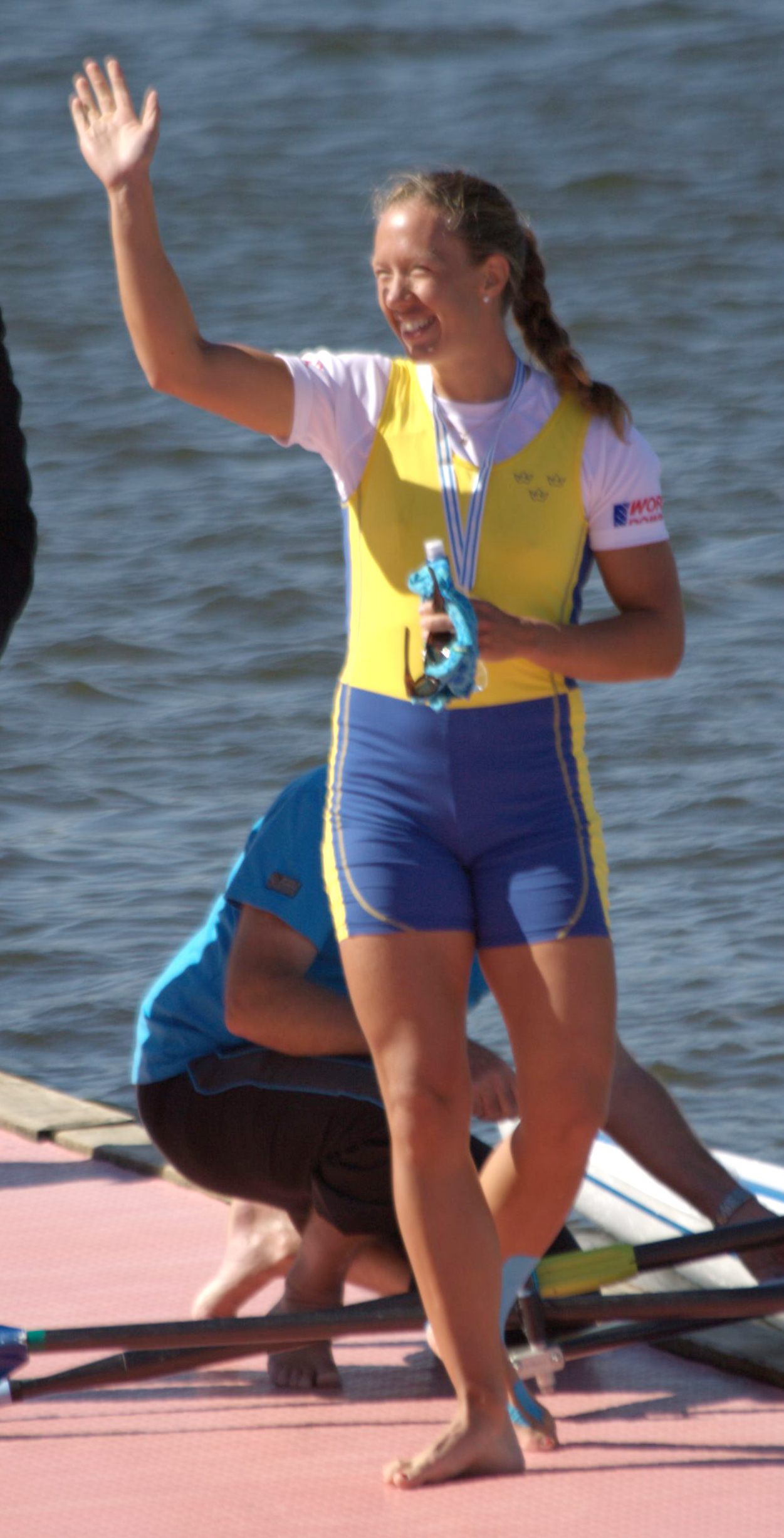
- Svensson in 2010

Personal information
- Born: 18 August 1981 (age 44) Falkenberg, Sweden
Medal record
Women's rowing
Representing Sweden
World Championships
Gold medal – first place	2010 Cambridge	Single scull
Bronze medal – third place	2006 Eton	Single scull
Rowing World Cup
Silver medal – second place	Banyoles Estany, 2009	Single scull
Silver medal – second place	Eton Dorney Lake, 2013	Single scull
Bronze medal – third place	Lucerne, 2005	Single scull
Bronze medal – third place	Amsterdam Bosbaan, 2007	Single scull
Bronze medal – third place	Lucerne, 2010	Single scull
European Rowing Championships
Bronze medal – third place	2007 Poznan	Single scull
Bronze medal – third place	2010 Montemor-o-Velho	Single scull
Gold Cup Challenge
Bronze medal – third place	2011 Philadelphia	Single scull

Frida Svensson (born 18 August 1981) is a Swedish professional sculler. She won a gold medal in the women's single scull at the 2010 World Rowing Championships in Lake Karapiro, the victory was notable for narrowly defeating Ekaterina Karsten who had dominated women's sculling since 1996. She was Swedish Rower of the year in 2006, and won a bronze medal at the women's single scull at the 2006 World Rowing Championships on Dorney Lake Eton.
