= Ekaterina Karsten =

Belarusian rower (born 1972)

Ekaterina Karsten (née Khadatovich)
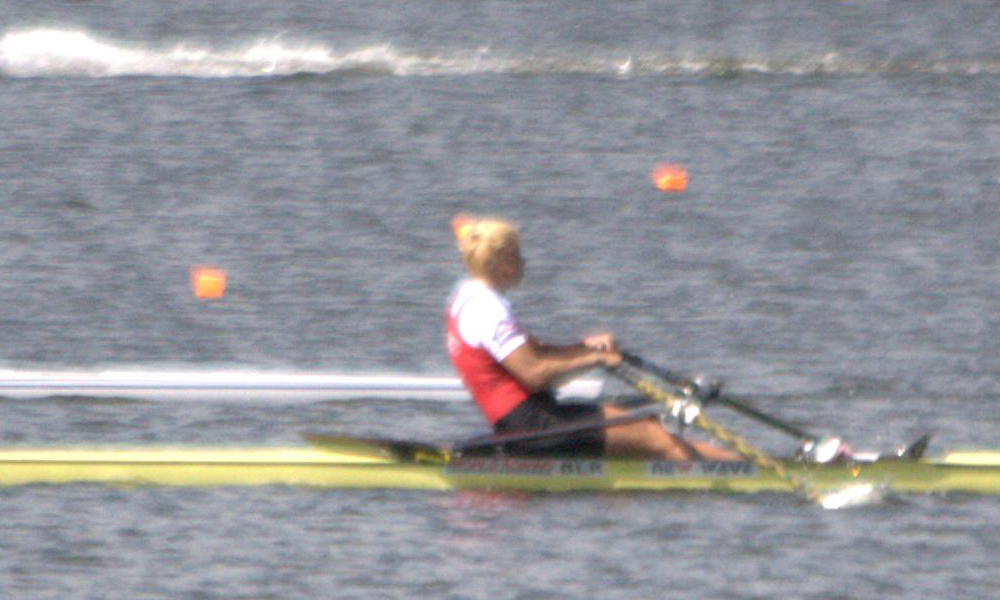
- Karsten at the 2010 World Championships

Personal information
- Born: 2 June 1972 (age 54) Asechyna, Belarus

Sport
- Sport: Rowing
- Event: single sculls
- Club: Minsk City Club
Medal record
Women's rowing
Olympic Games
Representing Belarus
Gold medal – first place	1996 Atlanta	Single sculls
Gold medal – first place	2000 Sydney	Single sculls
Silver medal – second place	2004 Athens	Single sculls
Bronze medal – third place	2008 Beijing	Single sculls
Representing Unified Team
Bronze medal – third place	1992 Barcelona	Quadruple sculls
World Championships
Representing Belarus
Gold medal – first place	1997 Aiguebelette-le-Lac	Single sculls
Gold medal – first place	1999 St. Catharines	Single sculls
Gold medal – first place	2005 Kaizu	Single sculls
Gold medal – first place	2006 Dorney	Single sculls
Gold medal – first place	2007 Oberschleißheim	Single sculls
Gold medal – first place	2009 Poznań	Single sculls
Silver medal – second place	2002 Seville	Single sculls
Silver medal – second place	2003 Milan	Quadruple sculls
Silver medal – second place	2010 Cambridge	Single sculls
Silver medal – second place	2011 Bled	Single sculls
Bronze medal – third place	2001 Lucerne	Single sculls
Bronze medal – third place	2001 Lucerne	Double sculls
Bronze medal – third place	2002 Seville	Quadruple sculls
Bronze medal – third place	2003 Milan	Single sculls
Bronze medal – third place	2013 Chungju	Double sculls
Representing Soviet Union
Bronze medal – third place	1991 Vienna	Double sculls
World Junior Championships
Representing Soviet Union
Gold medal – first place	1990 Aiguebelette-le-Lac	Single sculls
European Championships
Representing Belarus
Gold medal – first place	2014 Belgrade	Quadruple sculls
Silver medal – second place	2017 Račice	Single sculls
Gold Cup Challenge
Representing Belarus
Silver medal – second place	2011 Philadelphia	Single sculls

Ekaterina Karsten (née Khadatovich, Хадатовіч; Belarusian: Кацярына Карстэн, Kaciaryna Karsten; Russian: Екатерина Карстен; born 2 June 1972) is a Belarusian rower, a seven-time Olympian and the first medalist from the Republic of Belarus, a two-time Olympic champion and six-time World Champion in the single scull.

== Biography ==
At the 1992 Olympic Games in Barcelona, under her maiden name of Khadatovich, she competed in her first Olympic Games in the women's quadruple sculls as part of the Unified Team at the 1992 Summer Olympics due to the recent Dissolution of the Soviet Union, winning the bronze medal.

Khadatovich began to concentrate her career as a single sculler and by the start of the 1996 Summer Olympics in Atlanta, she had established herself as a major contender for the women's Olympic single sculls. She claimed gold, winning the final in a time of 7:32.31.

She then won both World Championship gold medals in 1997 and 1999 and married a German, where she took the name Karsten. She competed at her third Olympic Games in 2000 in Sydney, where she won gold in the single sculls event by one hundredth of one second over Rumyana Neykova of Bulgaria.

In 2001, Karsten won the Princess Royal Challenge Cup at the Henley Royal Regatta, rowing for the Minsk City Club and defeating German Katrin Rutschow-Stomporowski in the final.

At the 2004 Summer Olympics in Athens, she won a silver medal in the single sculls, and a bronze medal at the 2008 Summer Olympics in Beijing in the same event.

She also won the World Championships in the single sculls in 1997, 1999, 2005, 2006, 2007, and 2009, earned silver in 2002 and 2010, and bronze in 2001 and 2003. She won the European Championships in 2009 and 2010. She won the World Junior Championships in 1990.

She reached the final of the single sculls event at the 2012 Summer Olympics and made it to the semi-finals of the same event at the 2016 Summer Olympics.

== See also ==
- List of multiple Summer Olympic medalists
