= William Miller (rower, born 1905) =

American rower

Olympic medal record

Men's rowing
Silver medal – second place	1928 Amsterdam	Coxless four
Silver medal – second place	1932 Los Angeles	Single sculls

William G. Miller (March 16, 1905 – May 1985) was an American rower who competed in the 1928 Summer Olympics and in the 1932 Summer Olympics.

In 1928 he was part of the American boat, which won the silver medal in the coxless fours event.

Four years later he won his second silver medal this time in the single sculls competition.
