= Li Qin (rower) =

Chinese rower

Li Qin (Chinese: 李勤; born 17 April 1981 in Guangyuan, Sichuan) is a female Chinese rower, who competed for Team China at the 2008 Summer Olympics.

== Major performances ==
- 2000 National Games/National Championships – 1st double sculls;
- 2007 World Cup Austria/Munich/Netherlands – 1st double sculls;
- 2007 World Championships – 1st double sculls
