= Miroslava Knapková =

Czech rower (born 1980)

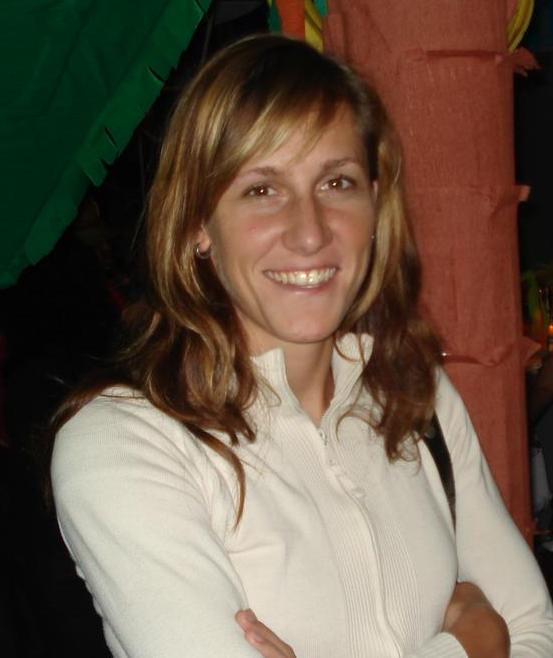
- Knapková in 2008

Personal information
- Full name: Miroslava Topinková Knapková
- Nickname: Mirka
- Born: 19 September 1980 (age 45) Brno

Sport
- Sport: Rowing
- Club: V.K. Slavia Praha
Medal record
Women's rowing
Representing the Czech Republic
Olympic Games
Gold medal – first place	2012 London	Single sculls
World Championships
Gold medal – first place	2011 Bled	Single sculls
Silver medal – second place	2005 Gifu	Single sculls
Silver medal – second place	2006 Eton	Single sculls
Silver medal – second place	2015 Aiguebelette	Single sculls
Bronze medal – third place	2009 Poznań	Single sculls
Bronze medal – third place	2013 Chungju	Single sculls
European Championships
Gold medal – first place	2008 Marathon	Single sculls
Gold medal – first place	2011 Plovdiv	Single sculls
Gold medal – first place	2013 Seville	Single sculls
Gold medal – first place	2014 Belgrade	Single sculls
Gold medal – first place	2015 Poznań	Single sculls
Silver medal – second place	2007 Poznań	Single sculls
Silver medal – second place	2009 Brest	Single sculls
Silver medal – second place	2010 Montemor-o-Velho	Single sculls
Bronze medal – third place	2019 Lucerne	Single sculls

Miroslava "Mirka" Topinková Knapková (Czech pronunciation: [ˈmɪroslava ˈknapkovaː], born 19 September 1980) is a Czech rower who won an Olympic gold medal in the single scull.

== Biography ==
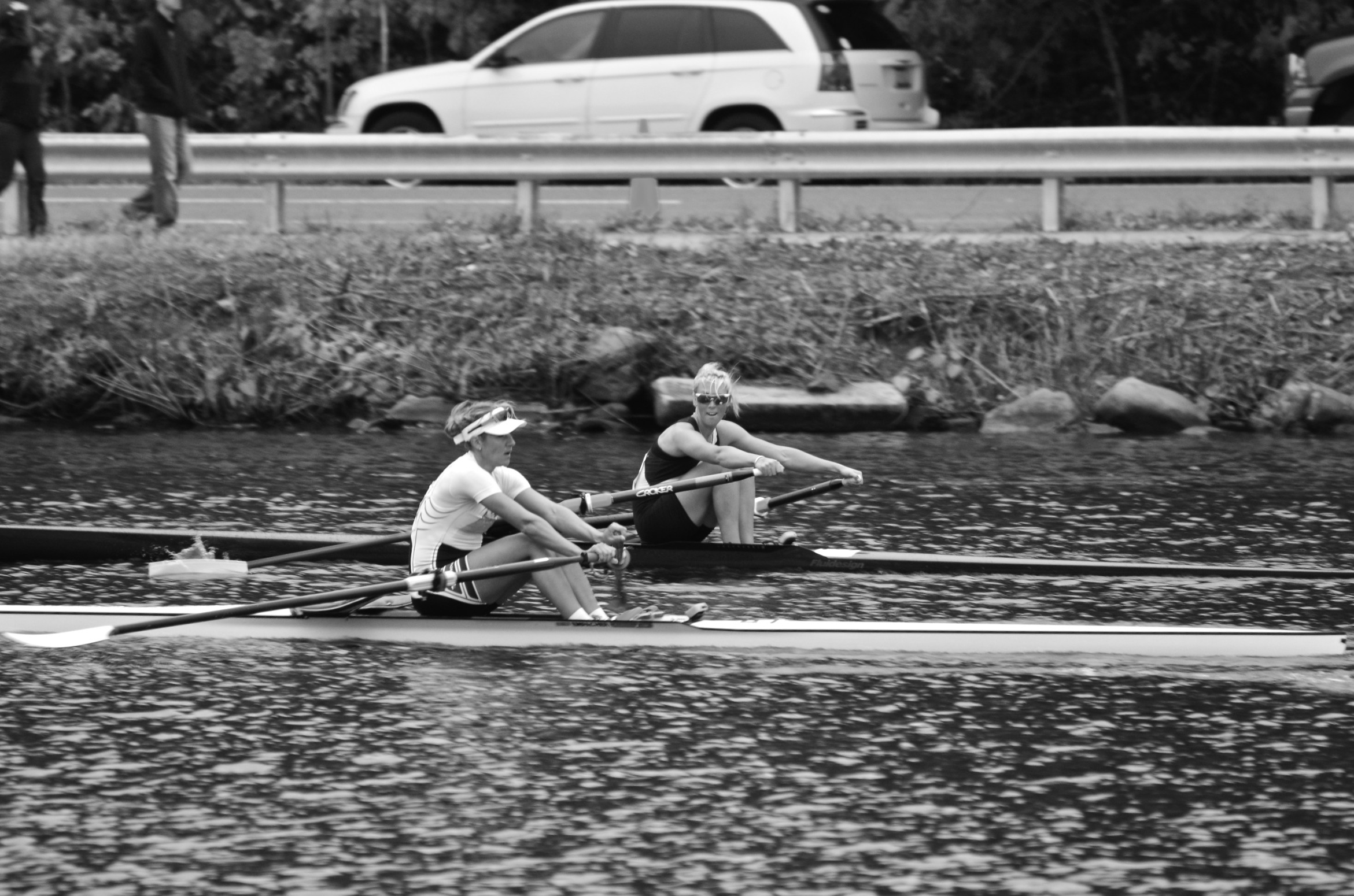
Knapková (front) and Emma Twigg at the Head of the Charles Regatta in October 2013

Knapková was born in 1980 in Brno in Czechoslovakia (since 1993 in the Czech Republic). Her father is Miroslav Knapek.

At the 2011 World Rowing Championships, she became world champion in single scull at Lake Bled, Slovenia. She was the winner in the same discipline at the 2012 Summer Olympics. Between 2008 and 2015, she won the European Rowing Championships five times in this boat class.

In 2015, Knapková won her fifth Princess Royal Challenge Cup (the premier women's singles sculls event) at the Henley Royal Regatta, rowing for the V.K. Slavia Praha. Having previously won the event in 2010, 2011 2013 and 2014, the fifth success equalled the record number of wins, set by Maria Brandin in 1998.
