= Rowing at the 2004 Summer Olympics – Men's single sculls =

Men's single sculls at the Games of the XXVIII Olympiad
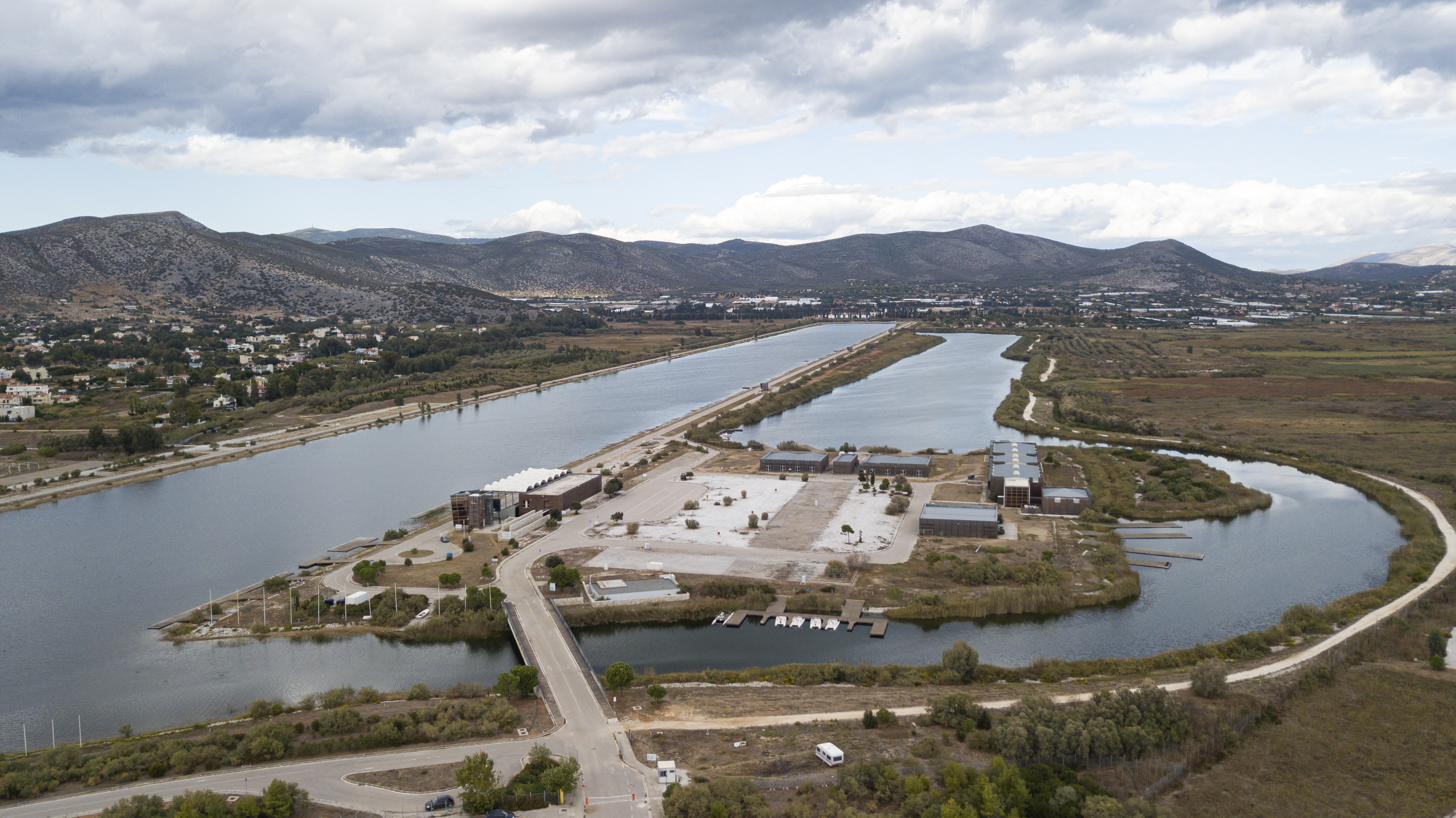
- Schinias venue
- Venue: Schinias Olympic Rowing and Canoeing Centre
- Dates: 14–21 August 2004
- Competitors: 29 from 29 nations
- Winning time: 6:49.30

Medalists
1st place, gold medalist(s)		Olaf Tufte; Norway
2nd place, silver medalist(s)		Jüri Jaanson; Estonia
3rd place, bronze medalist(s)		Ivo Yanakiev; Bulgaria

The men's single sculls competition at the 2004 Summer Olympics took place at Schinias Olympic Rowing and Canoeing Centre, Greece. The event was held from 14 to 21 August and was one of six events for male competitors in Rowing at the 2004 Summer Olympics in Athens. There were 29 competitors from 29 nations, with each nation limited to a single boat in the event. The event was won by Olaf Tufte of Norway. Silver went to Jüri Jaanson of Estonia, with bronze to Ivo Yanakiev of Bulgaria. It was the first medal in the men's single sculls for all three nations. Marcel Hacker's failure to make the final made this the first men's single sculls race since 1956 without a German rower on the podium; between the United Team of Germany, East Germany, West Germany, and Germany, the German medal streak in the event had been 11 Games long.

== Background ==
This was the 24th appearance of the event. Rowing had been on the programme in 1896 but was cancelled due to bad weather. The single sculls has been held every time that rowing has been contested, beginning in 1900.

Six of the 24 single scullers from the 2000 Games returned: bronze medallist Marcel Hacker of Germany, fifth-place finisher Ivo Yanakiev of Bulgaria, sixth-place finisher Jüri Jaanson of Estonia, eleventh-place finisher Václav Chalupa of the Czech Republic, twelfth-place finisher Ali Ibrahim of Egypt, and thirteenth-place finisher Anderson Nocetti of Brazil. Jaanson, Chalupa, and Ibrahim had also competed in 1996; Chalupa had won a silver medal in 1992, with Jaanson finishing fifth that year. Hacker and Olaf Tufte were favored, with defending champion Rob Waddell of New Zealand and runner-up Xeno Müller of Switzerland retired and Iztok Čop of Slovenia competing only in the double sculls. Hacker, Tufte, Čop, and Chalupa had taken all 12 of the World Championships medals since the last Games, with Tufte winning in 2001 and 2003 and Hacker in 2002.

The People's Republic of China, Chinese Taipei, India, Kenya, Paraguay, Peru, and Uzbekistan each made their debut in the event. Great Britain made its 19th appearance, tying the absent United States for most among nations.

== Competition format ==
This rowing event is a single scull event, meaning that each boat is propelled by a single rower. The "scull" portion means that the rower uses two oars, one on each side of the boat; this contrasts with sweep rowing in which each rower has one oar and rows on only one side (not feasible for singles events). The competition consists of multiple rounds. Finals were held to determine the placing of each boat; these finals were given letters with those nearer to the beginning of the alphabet meaning a better ranking. Semifinals were named based on which finals they fed, with each semifinal having multiple possible finals. The course used the 2000 metres distance that became the Olympic standard in 1912.

During the first round six quarterfinal heats, each with 4 or 5 boats, were held. The winning boat in each heat advanced to the A/B/C semifinals, while all others were relegated to the repechages.

The repechages offered the rowers another chance to qualify for the top semifinals. Placing in the repechages determined which semifinal the boat would race in. Six heats were held, with 3 or 4 boats each. The top two boats in each repechage moved on to the A/B/C semifinals, with the bottom three boats going to the D/E semifinals (and out of medal contention).

Five semifinals were held: three of the A/B/C semifinals and two of the D/E semifinals. For each A/B/C semifinal race, the top two boats advanced to the A final to compete for medals. The next two boats (3rd and 4th in each semifinal) went to the B final. The last two boats went to the C final. For the D/E semifinals, the top three boats in each semifinal went to the D final while the remaining boats went to the E final.

The fourth and final round was the finals. Each final determined a set of rankings. The A final determined the medals, along with the rest of the places through 6th. The B final gave rankings from 7th to 12th, the C from 13th to 18th, and so on. Thus, to win a medal rowers had to finish in either the top one of their quarterfinal or top two of their repechage heat and top two of their A/B/C semifinal to reach the A final.

== Schedule ==
All times are Greece Standard Time (UTC+2)

Date	Time	Round
Saturday, 14 August 2004	9:10	Quarterfinals
Tuesday, 17 August 2004	14:58	Repechage
Wednesday, 18 August 2004	8:50; 12:00	Semifinals A/B/C; Semifinals D/E
Thursday, 19 August 2004	10:20; 11:30; 11:50; 12:00	Final B Final C Final D Final E
Saturday, 21 August 2004	8:50	Final A

== Results ==
=== Quarterfinals ===
Quarterfinal heats were held on 14 August. The first place rower in each heat advanced directly to the top section semifinals, while the rest were sent to the repechages.

==== Quarterfinal 1 ====
Rank	Rower	Nation	Time	Notes
1	Tim Maeyens	Belgium	7:17.68	QABC
2	André Vonarburg	Switzerland	7:23.43	R
3	Law Hiu Fung	Hong Kong	7:28.16	R
4	Wang Ming-hui	Chinese Taipei	7:29.99	R
5	Daniel Sosa	Paraguay	7:52.50	R

==== Quarterfinal 2 ====
Rank	Rower	Nation	Time	Notes
1	Václav Chalupa	Czech Republic	7:13.84	QABC
2	Craig Jones	Australia	7:19.71	R
3	Davor Mizerit	Slovenia	7:24.60	R
4	Ali Ibrahim	Egypt	7:36.60	R
5	Óscar Vásquez	Chile	7:38.04	R

==== Quarterfinal 3 ====
Rank	Rower	Nation	Time	Notes
1	Santiago Fernández	Argentina	7:22.52	QABC
2	Raphael Hartl	Austria	7:34.61	R
3	Vladimir Chernenko	Uzbekistan	7:38.27	R
4	Mohamed Aich	Algeria	7:41.85	R
5	Paulose Pandari Kunnel	India	8:00.11	R

==== Quarterfinal 4 ====
Rank	Rower	Nation	Time	Notes
1	Olaf Tufte	Norway	7:12.53	QABC
2	Ian Lawson	Great Britain	7:24.01	R
3	Anderson Nocetti	Brazil	7:26.81	R
4	Gustavo Salcedo	Peru	7:29.06	R
5	Leandro Salvagno	Uruguay	7:43.91	R

==== Quarterfinal 5 ====
Rank	Rower	Nation	Time	Notes
1	Marcel Hacker	Germany	7:17.55	QABC
2	Yuleidys Cascaret	Cuba	7:19.45	R
3	Dirk Lippits	Netherlands	7:21.19	R
4	Su Hui	China	7:23.19	R
5	Ham Jeong-uk	South Korea	7:50.39	R

==== Quarterfinal 6 ====
Rank	Rower	Nation	Time	Notes
1	Jüri Jaanson	Estonia	7:13.74	QABC
2	Ivo Yanakiev	Bulgaria	7:28.97	R
3	Matteo Stefanini	Italy	7:31.54	R
4	Ibrahim Githaiga	Kenya	8:13.33	R

=== Repechage ===
The repechage took place on 17 August. The top two rowers in each repechage heat advanced to the top section of semifinals, while the others were relegated to the consolation semifinals (D and E).

==== Repechage heat 1 ====
Rank	Rower	Nation	Time	Notes
1	Ivo Yanakiev	Bulgaria	6:52.51	QABC
2	Dirk Lippits	Netherlands	7:01.39	QABC
3	Gustavo Salcedo	Peru	7:05.08	QDE
4	Paulose Pandari Kunnel	India	7:29.47	QDE

==== Repechage heat 2 ====
Rank	Rower	Nation	Time	Notes
1	Yuleidys Cascaret	Cuba	6:58.44	QABC
2	Anderson Nocetti	Brazil	7:03.08	QABC
3	Oscar Vasquez	Chile	7:06.51	QDE
4	Mohammed Aich	Algeria	7:46.98	QDE

==== Repechage heat 3 ====
Rank	Rower	Nation	Time	Notes
1	Ian Lawson	Great Britain	6:56.55	QABC
2	Ali Ibrahim	Egypt	6:59.05	QABC
3	Vladimir Tchernenko	Uzbekistan	7:13.43	QDE
4	Daniel Sosa	Paraguay	7:21.03	QDE

==== Repechage heat 4 ====
Rank	Rower	Nation	Time	Notes
1	Davor Mizerit	Slovenia	7:01.31	QABC
2	Raphael Hartl	Austria	7:06.21	QABC
3	Wang Ming-hui	Chinese Taipei	7:09.99	QDE

==== Repechage heat 5 ====
Rank	Rower	Nation	Time	Notes
1	Craig Jones	Australia	7:06.13	QABC
2	Law Hiu Fung	Hong Kong	7:10.72	QABC
3	Ham Jung-wook	South Korea	7:11.38	QDE
4	Ibrahim Githaiga	Kenya	7:25.58	QDE

==== Repechage heat 6 ====
Rank	Rower	Nation	Time	Notes
1	André Vonarburg	Switzerland	6:53.48	QABC
2	Su Hui	China	6:57.77	QABC
3	Leandro Salvagno	Uruguay	7:02.68	QDE
4	Matteo Stefanini	Italy	7:08.91	QDE

=== Semifinals ===
The semifinals were conducted on 18 August. The A, B, and C semifinals were for those rowers who still had a chance at medaling, and the top two in each of those semifinals moved on to the A final (top 6 places), the next two to the B final (places 7–12), and the bottom two in each to the C final (13–18). The D and E semifinals were consolation semis and the rowers in them had already been eliminated from medal contention; the top three in each moved to the D final (places 19–24) and the rest moved to E final (places 25–29).

Three of the four favored scullers, Václav Chalupa, Jüri Jaanson and Olaf Tufte, all qualified relatively easily for the finals from Semis A, B and C, respectively. But in a major surprise, Marcel Hacker, who was in Semi B with Tufte, finished third and failed to qualify. Hacker was the returning bronze medallist, a former World Champion, and holder of the World's best time. Ivo Yanakiev, who finished second in Semi B, went on to win a bronze medal.

==== Semifinal D/E 1 ====
Rank	Rower	Nation	Time	Notes
1	Gustavo Salcedo	Peru	7:09.06	QD
2	Matteo Stefanini	Italy	7:10.34	QD
3	Vladimir Tchernenko	Uzbekistan	7:13.21	QD
4	Wang Ming-hui	Chinese Taipei	7:14.79	QE
5	Mohammed Aich	Algeria	7:22.05	QE
6	Ibrahim Githaiga	Kenya	7:40.78	QE

==== Semifinal D/E 2 ====
Rank	Rower	Nation	Time	Notes
1	Leandro Salvagno	Uruguay	7:24.41	QD
2	Oscar Vasquez	Chile	7:27.11	QD
3	Ham Jung-wook	South Korea	7:33.70	QD
4	Daniel Sosa	Paraguay	7:36.87	QE
5	Paulose Pandari Kunnel	India	7:48.38	QE

==== Semifinal A/B/C 1 ====
Rank	Rower	Nation	Time	Notes
1	Václav Chalupa	Czech Republic	6:59.39	QA
2	Santiago Fernández	Argentina	7:00.90	QA
3	Davor Mizerit	Slovenia	7:04.07	QB
4	Craig Jones	Australia	7:05.94	QB
5	Dirk Lippits	Netherlands	7:05.94	QC
6	Su Hui	China	7:10.33	QC

==== Semifinal A/B/C 2 ====
Rank	Rower	Nation	Time	Notes
1	Olaf Tufte	Norway	6:50.55	QA
2	Ivo Yanakiev	Bulgaria	6:53.43	QA
3	Marcel Hacker	Germany	6:55.98	QB
4	André Vonarburg	Switzerland	7:08.52	QB
5	Anderson Nocetti	Brazil	7:11.90	QC
6	Ali Ibrahim	Egypt	7:14.58	QC

==== Semifinal A/B/C 3 ====
Rank	Rower	Nation	Time	Notes
1	Jüri Jaanson	Estonia	6:47.36	QA
2	Tim Maeyens	Belgium	6:50.33	QA
3	Ian Lawson	Great Britain	6:57.95	QB
4	Yuleidys Cascaret	Cuba	6:58.35	QB
5	Raphael Hartl	Austria	6:58.67	QC
6	Law Hiu Fung	Hong Kong	7:12.52	QC

=== Finals ===
Finals were contested on 19 August, except for the medal final on 21 August.

In the finals, Václav Chalupa followed by Fernandez and Maeyens pulled out to an early lead. At the 1000 meter mark (halfway), Olaf Tufte grabbed a small lead over Chalupa with Jüri Jaanson a close third. With 500 meters to go, Jaanson took a small lead over Tufte. Two seconds back (one length), Chalupa held a small lead for third over Ivo Yanakiev who had been slowly moving up through the field. In the final 500 meters, Tufte regained the lead and pulled away to win by a length over Jaanson. Meanwhile, Yanakiev grabbed third over Chalupa who faded to fifth place.

==== Final E ====
Rank	Rower	Nation	Time
25	Wang Ming-hui	Chinese Taipei	7:07.84
26	Daniel Sosa	Paraguay	7:13.49
27	Paulose Pandari Kunnel	India	7:22.63
28	Mohammed Aich	Algeria	7:25.49
29	Ibrahim Githaiga	Kenya	7:29.02

==== Final D ====
Rank	Rower	Nation	Time
19	Matteo Stefanini	Italy	6:57.16
20	Leandro Salvagno	Uruguay	7:01.33
21	Gustavo Salcedo	Peru	7:03.24
22	Ham Jung-wook	South Korea	7:10.44
23	Oscar Vasquez	Chile	7:10.75
24	Vladimir Tchernenko	Uzbekistan	7:23.56

==== Final C ====
Rank	Rower	Nation	Time
13	Anderson Nocetti	Brazil	6:53.64
14	Ali Ibrahim	Egypt	6:55.34
15	Su Hui	China	6:57.42
16	Dirk Lippits	Netherlands	6:58.20
17	Raphael Hartl	Austria	7:00.75
18	Law Hiu Fung	Hong Kong	7:10.75

==== Final B ====
Rank	Rower	Nation	Time
7	Marcel Hacker	Germany	6:47.26
8	André Vonarburg	Switzerland	6:52.88
9	Davor Mizerit	Slovenia	6:55.64
10	Ian Lawson	Great Britain	6:57.63
11	Craig Jones	Australia	6:58.48
12	Yuleidys Cascaret	Cuba	6:58.61

==== Final A ====
Rank	Rower	Nation	Time
1st place, gold medalist(s)	Olaf Tufte	Norway	6:49.30
2nd place, silver medalist(s)	Jüri Jaanson	Estonia	6:51.42
3rd place, bronze medalist(s)	Ivo Yanakiev	Bulgaria	6:52.80
4	Santiago Fernández	Argentina	6:55.17
5	Václav Chalupa	Czech Republic	6:59.13
6	Tim Maeyens	Belgium	7:01.74

== Results summary ==
Rank	Rower	Nation	Quarterfinals	Repechage	Semifinals	Finals
1st place, gold medalist(s)	Olaf Tufte	Norway	7:12.53	Bye	6:50.55; Semifinals A/B/C	6:49.30; Final A
2nd place, silver medalist(s)	Jüri Jaanson	Estonia	7:13.74	Bye	6:47.36; Semifinals A/B/C	6:51.42; Final A
3rd place, bronze medalist(s)	Ivo Yanakiev	Bulgaria	7:28.97	6:52.51	6:53.43; Semifinals A/B/C	6:52.80; Final A
4	Santiago Fernández	Argentina	7:22.52	Bye	7:00.90; Semifinals A/B/C	6:55.17; Final A
5	Václav Chalupa	Czech Republic	7:13.84	Bye	6:59.39; Semifinals A/B/C	6:59.13; Final A
6	Tim Maeyens	Belgium	7:17.68	Bye	6:50.33; Semifinals A/B/C	7:01.74; Final A
7	Marcel Hacker	Germany	7:17.55	Bye	6:55.98; Semifinals A/B/C	6:47.26; Final B
8	André Vonarburg	Switzerland	7:23.43	6:53.48	7:08.52; Semifinals A/B/C	6:52.88; Final B
9	Davor Mizerit	Slovenia	7:24.60	7:01.31	7:04.07; Semifinals A/B/C	6:55.64; Final B
10	Ian Lawson	Great Britain	7:24.01	6:56.55	6:57.95; Semifinals A/B/C	6:57.63; Final B
11	Craig Jones	Australia	7:19.71	7:06.13	7:05.94; Semifinals A/B/C	6:58.48; Final B
12	Yuleidys Cascaret	Cuba	7:19.45	6:58.44	6:58.35; Semifinals A/B/C	6:58.61; Final B
13	Anderson Nocetti	Brazil	7:26.81	7:03.08	7:11.90; Semifinals A/B/C	6:53.64; Final C
14	Ali Ibrahim	Egypt	7:36.60	6:59.05	7:14.58; Semifinals A/B/C	6:55.34; Final C
15	Su Hui	China	7:23.19	6:57.77	7:10.33; Semifinals A/B/C	6:57.42; Final C
16	Dirk Lippits	Netherlands	7:21.19	7:01.39	7:05.94; Semifinals A/B/C	6:58.20; Final C
17	Raphael Hartl	Austria	7:34.61	7:06.21	6:58.67; Semifinals A/B/C	7:00.75; Final C
18	Law Hiu Fung	Hong Kong	7:28.16	7:10.72	7:12.52; Semifinals A/B/C	7:10.75; Final C
19	Matteo Stefanini	Italy	7:31.54	7:08.91	7:10.34; Semifinals D/E	6:57.16; Final D
20	Leandro Salvagno	Uruguay	7:43.91	7:02.68	7:24.41; Semifinals D/E	7:01.33; Final D
21	Gustavo Salcedo	Peru	7:29.06	7:05.08	7:09.06; Semifinals D/E	7:03.24; Final D
22	Ham Jung-wook	South Korea	7:50.39	7:11.38	7:33.70; Semifinals D/E	7:10.44; Final D
23	Oscar Vasquez	Chile	7:38.04	7:06.51	7:27.11; Semifinals D/E	7:10.75; Final D
24	Vladimir Tchernenko	Uzbekistan	7:38.27	7:13.43	7:13.21; Semifinals D/E	7:23.56; Final D
25	Wang Ming-hui	Chinese Taipei	7:29.99	7:09.99	7:14.79; Semifinals D/E	7:07.84; Final E
26	Daniel Sosa	Paraguay	7:52.50	7:21.03	7:36.87; Semifinals D/E	7:13.49; Final E
27	Paulose Pandari Kunnel	India	8:00.11	7:29.47	7:48.38; Semifinals D/E	7:22.63; Final E
28	Mohammed Aich	Algeria	7:41.85	7:46.98	7:22.05; Semifinals D/E	7:25.49; Final E
29	Ibrahim Githaiga	Kenya	8:13.33	7:25.58	7:40.78; Semifinals D/E	7:29.02; Final E
