= Rowing at the 2008 Summer Olympics – Men's single sculls =

Men's single sculls at the Games of the XXIX Olympiad
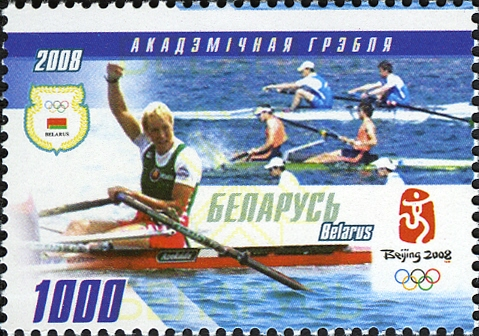
- Belarus stamp commemorating rowing at the 2008 Summer Olympics
- Venue: Shunyi Olympic Rowing-Canoeing Park
- Dates: 9–16 August 2008
- Competitors: 32 from 32 nations
- Winning time: 6:59.83

Medalists
1st place, gold medalist(s)		Olaf Tufte; Norway
2nd place, silver medalist(s)		Ondřej Synek; Czech Republic
3rd place, bronze medalist(s)		Mahé Drysdale; New Zealand

The men's single sculls competition at the 2008 Summer Olympics in Beijing was held between 9 and 16 August, at the Shunyi Olympic Rowing-Canoeing Park. There were 32 competitors from 32 nations. The event was won by Olaf Tufte of Norway, the fifth man to successfully defend an Olympic title in the event (and 12th to win multiple medals of any colour). The silver medal went to Ondřej Synek of the Czech Republic, the nation's first medal in the event (though Czech rower Václav Chalupa had earned silver in 1992 for Czechoslovakia). Mahé Drysdale of New Zealand earned bronze. Both Synek and Drysdale would go on to win medals in the event again in 2012 and 2016 (with Drysdale the gold medallist both times).

== Background ==
This was the 25th appearance of the event. Rowing had been on the programme in 1896 but was cancelled due to bad weather. The single sculls has been held every time that rowing has been contested, beginning in 1900.

Eight of the 18 A/B/C semifinalists from the 2004 Games returned: gold medallist Olaf Tufte of Norway, fourth-place finisher Santiago Fernández of Argentina, sixth-place finisher Tim Maeyens of Belgium, seventh-place finisher (and 2000 bronze medallist) Marcel Hacker of Germany, eighth-place finisher André Vonarburg of Switzerland, thirteenth-place finisher (who had taken the same place in 2000) Anderson Nocetti of Brazil, fourteenth-place finisher (and 1996 and 2000 competitor) Ali Ibrahim of Egypt, and eighteenth-place finisher Law Hiu Fung of Hong Kong. Tufte, despite being defending champion, was not the favorite; that was Mahé Drysdale of New Zealand, who had won all three World Championships since the 2008 Games (Tufte had a silver and a bronze in that time). Other contenders included Hacker, trying to come back from a disappointing Final B performance in 2004; Ondřej Synek of the Czech Republic, with a silver and two bronze medals in the last three Worlds; Fernández, the reigning Pan American champion, and Alan Campbell of Great Britain, the Diamond Challenge Sculls winner in 2007.

Cameroon, Colombia, Honduras, Iran, Lithuania, Monaco, and Venezuela each made their debut in the event. Great Britain and the United States each made their 20th appearance, tied for most among nations.

== Qualification ==
Nations had been limited to one boat (one rower) each since 1912. The 33 qualifiers were:

- 11 boats from the 2007 World Championships
- 6 boats from the Asian Qualification Regatta
- 4 boats from the 2007 All-Africa Games
- 6 boats from the Latin American Qualification Regatta
- 4 boats from the Final Qualification Regatta
- 2 invitational boats

== Competition format ==
This rowing event is a single scull event, meaning that each boat is propelled by a single rower. The "scull" portion means that the rower uses two oars, one on each side of the boat; this contrasts with sweep rowing in which each rower has one oar and rows on only one side (not feasible for singles events). The competition consists of multiple rounds. The format continued to use four rounds, as in previous Games, but instead of three main rounds and a repechage, all four rounds were main rounds: there was no repechage. Finals were held to determine the placing of each boat; these finals were given letters with those nearer to the beginning of the alphabet meaning a better ranking. Semifinals were named based on which finals they fed, with each semifinal having two possible finals. The course used the 2000 metres distance that became the Olympic standard in 1912.

During the first round six heats were held. The top four boats in each heat advanced to the quarterfinals, while all others were relegated to the E/F semifinals.

The quarterfinals were the second round for rowers still competing for medals. Placing in the quarterfinal heats determined which semifinal the boat would race in. The top three boats in each quarterfinal moved on to the A/B semifinals, with the bottom three boats going to the C/D semifinals.

Six semifinals were held, two each of A/B semifinals, C/D semifinals, and E/F semifinals. For each semifinal race, the top three boats moved on to the better of the two finals, while the bottom three boats went to the lesser of the two finals possible. For example, a second-place finish in an A/B semifinal would result in advancement to the A final.

The fourth and final round was the finals. Each final determined a set of rankings. The A final determined the medals, along with the rest of the places through 6th. The B final gave rankings from 7th to 12th, the C from 13th to 18th, and so on. Thus, to win a medal rowers had to finish in the top four of their heat, top three of their quarterfinal, and top three of their A/B semifinal to reach the A final.

== Schedule ==
All times are China Standard Time (UTC+8)

Date	Time	Round
Saturday, 9 August 2008	14:50	Heats
Monday, 11 August 2008	16:10; 17:40	Quarterfinals; Semifinals E/F
Wednesday, 13 August 2008	15:10; 15:50; 17:10	Semifinals C/D; Semifinals A/B; Final F
Friday, 15 August 2008	14:20; 14:40; 15:00; 17:00	Final E Final D Final C Final B
Saturday, 16 August 2008	15:50	Final A

== Results ==
=== Heats ===
The top four in each heat advanced to the quarterfinals, remaining in medal contention. Fifth and sixth placed boats went to the E/F semifinals, eligible for ranking between 25 and 32.

==== Heat 1 ====
Rank	Rower	Nation	Time	Notes
1	Tim Maeyens	Belgium	7:16.60	Q
2	André Vonarburg	Switzerland	7:26.21	Q
3	Ioannis Christou	Greece	7:29.86	Q
4	Santiago Fernández	Argentina	7:38.87	Q
5	Mohsen Shadi	Iran	7:48.24	QEF
6	Matthew Lidaywa Mwange	Kenya	8:16.09	QEF

==== Heat 2 ====
Rank	Rower	Nation	Time	Notes
1	Mahé Drysdale	New Zealand	7:28.80	Q
2	Anderson Nocetti	Brazil	7:35.52	Q
3	Oscar Vasquez	Chile	7:39.58	Q
4	Andrei Jämsä	Estonia	7:48.24	Q
5	Dhison Hernández	Venezuela	7:54.52	QEF
—	Zhang Liang	China	DNS	

==== Heat 3 ====
Rank	Rower	Nation	Time	Notes
1	Lassi Karonen	Sweden	7:14.64	Q
2	Marcel Hacker	Germany	7:26.71	Q
3	Law Hiu Fung	Hong Kong	7:45.96	Q
4	Leandro Salvagno	Uruguay	7:52.53	Q
5	Paul Etia Ndoumbe	Cameroon	7:59.26	QEF
6	Norberto Bernárdez Ávila	Honduras	9:01.27	QEF

==== Heat 4 ====
Rank	Rower	Nation	Time	Notes
1	Ondřej Synek	Czech Republic	7:23.94	Q
2	Mindaugas Griskonis	Lithuania	7:28.05	Q
3	Bajrang Lal Takhar	India	7:39.91	Q
4	Mathias Raymond	Monaco	7:51.69	Q
5	Chaouki Dries	Algeria	7:57.65	QEF

==== Heat 5 ====
Rank	Rower	Nation	Time	Notes
1	Alan Campbell	Great Britain	7:14.98	Q
2	Peter Hardcastle	Australia	7:17.74	Q
3	Patrick Loliger	Mexico	7:22.55	Q
4	Ken Jurkowski	United States	7:25.13	Q
5	Ruslan Naurzaliev	Uzbekistan	7:58.43	QEF

==== Heat 6 ====
Rank	Rower	Nation	Time	Notes
1	Olaf Tufte	Norway	7:20.20	Q
2	Sjoerd Hamburger	Netherlands	7:27.05	Q
3	Ali Ibrahim	Egypt	7:43.70	Q
4	Wang Ming-Hui	Chinese Taipei	7:46.83	Q
5	Rodrigo Ideus	Colombia	7:56.85	QEF

=== Quarterfinals ===
The top three boats in each quarterfinal went to the A/B semifinals, still in contention for medals and guaranteed to be in the top 12. Fourth through sixth place boats went to the C/D semifinals, ultimately ranked 13th through 24th.

==== Quarterfinal 1 ====
Rank	Rower	Nation	Time	Notes
1	Marcel Hacker	Germany	6:48.85	QAB
2	Alan Campbell	Great Britain	6:52.74	QAB
3	André Vonarburg	Switzerland	7:02.29	QAB
4	Oscar Vasquez	Chile	7:06.61	QCD
5	Mathias Raymond	Monaco	7:11.66	QCD
6	Ali Ibrahim	Egypt	7:24.77	QCD

==== Quarterfinal 2 ====
Rank	Rower	Nation	Time	Notes
1	Olaf Tufte	Norway	6:53.59	QAB
2	Mindaugas Griskonis	Lithuania	6:54.47	QAB
3	Ioannis Christou	Greece	6:58.28	QAB
4	Patrick Loliger	Mexico	7:04.30	QCD
5	Anderson Nocetti	Brazil	7:23.68	QCD
6	Leandro Salvagno	Uruguay	7:26.85	QCD

==== Quarterfinal 3 ====
Rank	Rower	Nation	Time	Notes
1	Ondřej Synek	Czech Republic	6:50.23	QAB
2	Tim Maeyens	Belgium	6:52.70	QAB
3	Peter Hardcastle	Australia	7:00.09	QAB
4	Andrei Jämsä	Estonia	7:05.48	QCD
5	Wang Ming-Hui	Chinese Taipei	7:17.08	QCD
6	Law Hiu Fung	Hong Kong	7:29.21	QCD

==== Quarterfinal 4 ====
Rank	Rower	Nation	Time	Notes
1	Mahé Drysdale	New Zealand	6:50.18	QAB
2	Lassi Karonen	Sweden	6:50.40	QAB
3	Ken Jurkowski	United States	6:53.26	QAB
4	Sjoerd Hamburger	Netherlands	6:57.24	QCD
5	Bajrang Lal Takhar	India	7:19.01	QCD
6	Santiago Fernández	Argentina	7:27.60	QCD

=== Semifinals ===
The top three boats in each semifinal went to the better final, while the fourth through sixth placed boats went to the lower final.

==== Semifinal E/F 1 ====
Rank	Rower	Nation	Time	Notes
1	Mohsen Shadi	Iran	7:20.34	QE
2	Rodrigo Ideus	Colombia	7:29.71	QE
3	Ruslan Naurzaliev	Uzbekistan	7:35.12	QE
4	Norberto Bernárdez Ávila	Honduras	8:29.65	QF

==== Semifinal E/F 2 ====
Rank	Rower	Nation	Time	Notes
1	Dhison Alexander Hernandez	Venezuela	7:18.85	QE
2	Paul Etia Ndoumbe	Cameroon	7:29.68	QE
3	Chaouki Dries	Algeria	7:34.84	QE
4	Matthew Lidaywa Mwange	Kenya	7:49.17	QF

==== Semifinal C/D 1 ====
Rank	Rower	Nation	Time	Notes
1	Patrick Loliger	Mexico	7:15.53	QC
2	Oscar Vasquez	Chile	7:17.17	QC
3	Ali Ibrahim	Egypt	7:20.73	QC
4	Bajrang Lal Takhar	India	7:23.00	QD
5	Wang Ming-Hui	Chinese Taipei	7:23.75	QD
6	Law Hiu Fung	Hong Kong	7:32.61	QD

==== Semifinals C/D 2 ====
Rank	Rower	Nation	Time	Notes
1	Sjoerd Hamburger	Netherlands	7:10.06	QC
2	Andrei Jämsä	Estonia	7:16.38	QC
3	Anderson Nocetti	Brazil	7:18.78	QC
4	Leandro Salvagno	Uruguay	7:32.83	QD
5	Mathias Raymond	Monaco	7:33.06	QD
—	Santiago Fernández	Argentina	DNS	

==== Semifinal A/B 1 ====
Rank	Rower	Nation	Time	Notes
1	Lassi Karonen	Sweden	6:57.28	QA
2	Olaf Tufte	Norway	6:58.23	QA
3	Tim Maeyens	Belgium	6:59.65	QA
4	Marcel Hacker	Germany	7:03.05	QB
5	André Vonarburg	Switzerland	7:14.64	QB
6	Peter Hardcastle	Australia	7:32.79	QB

==== Semifinal A/B 2 ====
Rank	Rower	Nation	Time	Notes
1	Ondřej Synek	Czech Republic	7:03.57	QA
2	Alan Campbell	Great Britain	7:05.24	QA
3	Mahé Drysdale	New Zealand	7:05.57	QA
4	Ioannis Christou	Greece	7:06.02	QB
5	Ken Jurkowski	United States	7:11.52	QB
6	Mindaugas Griskonis	Lithuania	7:20.32	QB

=== Finals ===
==== Final F ====
Rank	Rower	Nation	Time
30	Matthew Lidaywa Mwange	Kenya	7:52.59
31	Norberto Bernárdez Ávila	Honduras	8:32.22

==== Final E ====
Rank	Rower	Nation	Time
24	Dhison Alexander Hernandez	Venezuela	7:05.12
25	Mohsen Shadi	Iran	7:06.54
26	Ruslan Naurzaliev	Uzbekistan	7:09.98
27	Rodrigo Ideus	Colombia	7:18.61
28	Paul Etia Ndoumbe	Cameroon	7:21.34
29	Chaouki Dries	Algeria	7:32.82

==== Final D ====
Rank	Rower	Nation	Time
19	Leandro Salvagno	Uruguay	7:04.13
20	Law Hiu Fung	Hong Kong	7:06.17
21	Bajrang Lal Takhar	India	7:09.73
22	Mathias Raymond	Monaco	7:14.27
23	Wang Ming-Hui	Chinese Taipei	7:16.28

==== Final C ====
Rank	Rower	Nation	Time
13	Sjoerd Hamburger	Netherlands	6:58.71
14	Anderson Nocetti	Brazil	7:01.54
15	Patrick Loliger	Mexico	7:03.97
16	Oscar Vasquez	Chile	7:07.02
17	Andrei Jämsä	Estonia	7:19.60
18	Ali Ibrahim	Egypt	7:26.06

==== Final B ====
Rank	Rower	Nation	Time
7	Marcel Hacker	Germany	7:07.82
8	Mindaugas Griskonis	Lithuania	7:09.23
9	André Vonarburg	Switzerland	7:13.07
10	Ioannis Christou	Greece	7:17.74
11	Ken Jurkowski	United States	7:22.75
12	Peter Hardcastle	Australia	7:27.34

==== Final A ====
Rank	Rower	Nation	Time
1st place, gold medalist(s)	Olaf Tufte	Norway	6:59.83
2nd place, silver medalist(s)	Ondřej Synek	Czech Republic	7:00.63
3rd place, bronze medalist(s)	Mahé Drysdale	New Zealand	7:01.56
4	Tim Maeyens	Belgium	7:03.40
5	Alan Campbell	Great Britain	7:04.47
6	Lassi Karonen	Sweden	7:07.64

== Results summary ==
Rank	Rower	Nation	Heats	Quarterfinals	Semifinals	Finals
1st place, gold medalist(s)	Olaf Tufte	Norway	7:20.20	6:53.59	6:58.23; Semifinals A/B	6:59.83; Final A
2nd place, silver medalist(s)	Ondřej Synek	Czech Republic	7:23.94	6:50.23	7:03.57; Semifinals A/B	7:00.63; Final A
3rd place, bronze medalist(s)	Mahé Drysdale	New Zealand	7:28.80	6:50.18	7:05.57; Semifinals A/B	7:01.56; Final A
4	Tim Maeyens	Belgium	7:16.60	6:52.70	6:59.65; Semifinals A/B	7:03.40; Final A
5	Alan Campbell	Great Britain	7:14.98	6:52.74	7:05.24; Semifinals A/B	7:04.47; Final A
6	Lassi Karonen	Sweden	7:14.64	6:50.40	6:57.28; Semifinals A/B	7:07.64; Final A
7	Marcel Hacker	Germany	7:26.71	6:48.85	7:03.05; Semifinals A/B	7:07.82; Final B
8	Mindaugas Griskonis	Lithuania	7:28.05	6:54.47	7:20.32; Semifinals A/B	7:09.23; Final B
9	André Vonarburg	Switzerland	7:26.21	7:02.29	7:14.64; Semifinals A/B	7:13.07; Final B
10	Ioannis Christou	Greece	7:29.86	6:58.28	7:06.02; Semifinals A/B	7:17.74; Final B
11	Ken Jurkowski	United States	7:25.13	6:53.26	7:11.52; Semifinals A/B	7:22.75; Final B
12	Peter Hardcastle	Australia	7:17.74	7:00.09	7:32.79; Semifinals A/B	7:27.34; Final B
13	Sjoerd Hamburger	Netherlands	7:27.05	6:57.24	7:10.06; Semifinals C/D	6:58.71; Final C
14	Anderson Nocetti	Brazil	7:35.52	7:23.68	7:18.78; Semifinals C/D	7:01.54; Final C
15	Patrick Loliger	Mexico	7:22.55	7:04.30	7:15.53; Semifinals C/D	7:03.97; Final C
16	Oscar Vasquez	Chile	7:39.58	7:06.61	7:17.17; Semifinals C/D	7:07.02; Final C
17	Andrei Jämsä	Estonia	7:48.24	7:05.48	7:16.38; Semifinals C/D	7:19.60; Final C
18	Ali Ibrahim	Egypt	7:43.70	7:24.77	7:20.73; Semifinals C/D	7:26.06; Final C
19	Leandro Salvagno	Uruguay	7:52.53	7:26.85	7:32.83; Semifinals C/D	7:04.13; Final D
20	Law Hiu Fung	Hong Kong	7:45.96	7:29.21	7:32.61; Semifinals C/D	7:06.17; Final D
21	Bajrang Lal Takhar	India	7:39.91	7:19.01	7:23.00; Semifinals C/D	7:09.73; Final D
22	Mathias Raymond	Monaco	7:51.69	7:11.66	7:33.06; Semifinals C/D	7:14.27; Final D
23	Wang Ming-Hui	Chinese Taipei	7:46.83	7:17.08	7:23.75; Semifinals C/D	7:16.28; Final D
24	Dhison Alexander Hernandez	Venezuela	7:54.52	Bye	7:18.85; Semifinals E/F	7:05.12; Final E
25	Mohsen Shadi	Iran	7:48.24	Bye	7:20.34; Semifinals E/F	7:06.54; Final E
26	Ruslan Naurzaliev	Uzbekistan	7:58.43	Bye	7:35.12; Semifinals E/F	7:09.98; Final E
27	Rodrigo Ideus	Colombia	7:56.85	Bye	7:29.71; Semifinals E/F	7:18.61; Final E
28	Paul Etia Ndoumbe	Cameroon	7:59.26	Bye	7:29.68; Semifinals E/F	7:21.34; Final E
29	Chaouki Dries	Algeria	7:57.65	Bye	7:34.84; Semifinals E/F	7:32.82; Final E
30	Matthew Lidaywa Mwange	Kenya	8:16.09	Bye	7:49.17; Semifinals E/F	7:52.59; Final F
31	Norberto Bernárdez Ávila	Honduras	9:01.27	Bye	8:29.65; Semifinals E/F	8:32.22; Final F
32	Santiago Fernández	Argentina	7:38.87	7:27.60	DNS; Semifinals C/D	Did not advance
—	Zhang Liang	China	DNS	Did not advance		
