= Rowing at the 2006 Asian Games =

- Venue: West Bay Lagoon
- Dates: 3–7 December 2006
- Competitors: 172 from 20 nations

Rowing competed at the 2006 Asian Games in Doha, Qatar. Men's and women's singles, doubles, and fours competition took place at the West Bay Lagoon from December 3 to December 7. Since Doha was scarce of water the distance had to be shortened from standard 2000 meters to 1000 metres.

== Schedule ==
| H | Heats | R | Repechages | S | Semifinals | F | Finals |

| Event↓/Date → | 3rd Sun | 4th Mon | 5th Tue | 6th Wed | 7th Thu |
|---|---|---|---|---|---|
| Men's single sculls | H | R | S | | F |
| Men's double sculls | H | R | S | F | |
| Men's coxless four | H | R | S | | F |
| Men's lightweight single sculls | H | R | S | | F |
| Men's lightweight double sculls | H | R | S | F | |
| Women's single sculls | H | R | S | | F |
| Women's double sculls | H | R | | F | |
| Women's coxless four | H | R | S | F | |
| Women's lightweight single sculls | H | R | S | | F |
| Women's lightweight double sculls | H | R | | F | |

== Medalists ==
=== Men ===
| Event | Gold | Silver | Bronze |
|---|---|---|---|
| Single sculls | Shin Eun-chul; South Korea | Bajrang Lal Takhar; India | Mikhail Garnik; Kazakhstan |
| Double sculls | Uzbekistan; Vladimir Chernenko; Ruslan Naurzaliev | South Korea; Kim Dal-ho; Ham Jung-wook | China; Su Hui; Cui Yonghui |
| Coxless four | Japan; Yu Kataoka; Yuya Higashiyama; Rokuroh Okumura; Yoshinori Sato | India; Dharmesh Sangwan; Jenil Krishnan; Sukhjeet Singh; Satish Joshi | Indonesia; Thomas Hallatu; Sumardi; Jamaluddin; Iswandi |
| Lightweight single sculls | Wu Chongkui; China | Daisaku Takeda; Japan | Ruthtanaphol Theppibal; Thailand |
| Lightweight double sculls | Japan; Takahiro Suda; Hideki Omoto | Thailand; Ruthtanaphol Theppibal; Anupong Thainjam | India; Kiran Yalamanchi; Bijender Singh |

=== Women ===
| Event | Gold | Silver | Bronze |
|---|---|---|---|
| Single sculls | Jin Ziwei; China | Ai Fukuchi; Japan | Pere Karoba; Indonesia |
| Double sculls | China; Tian Liang; Li Qin | South Korea; Kim Ok-kyung; Shin Yeong-eun | Kazakhstan; Mariya Filimonova; Inga Dudchenko |
| Coxless four | China; Cheng Ran; Yu Chengxi; Gao Yanhua; Mu Suli | North Korea; Kang Kum-sun; Kim Ok-bun; Kim Ryon-ok; Yu Sun-ok | South Korea; Kim Soon-rye; Im Eun-seon; Eom Mi-seon; Min Su-hyoun |
| Lightweight single sculls | Xu Dongxiang; China | Lee Ka Man; Hong Kong | Phuttharaksa Neegree; Thailand |
| Lightweight double sculls | Uzbekistan; Sevara Ganieva; Zarrina Ganieva | Japan; Akiko Iwamoto; Eri Wakai | Thailand; Phuttharaksa Neegree; Bussayamas Phaengkathok |

== Medal table ==
| Rank | Nation | Gold | Silver | Bronze | Total |
|---|---|---|---|---|---|
| 1 | China (CHN) | 5 | 0 | 1 | 6 |
| 2 | Japan (JPN) | 2 | 3 | 0 | 5 |
| 3 | Uzbekistan (UZB) | 2 | 0 | 0 | 2 |
| 4 | South Korea (KOR) | 1 | 2 | 1 | 4 |
| 5 | India (IND) | 0 | 2 | 1 | 3 |
| 6 | Thailand (THA) | 0 | 1 | 3 | 4 |
| 7 | Hong Kong (HKG) | 0 | 1 | 0 | 1 |
| 7 | North Korea (PRK) | 0 | 1 | 0 | 1 |
| 9 | Indonesia (INA) | 0 | 0 | 2 | 2 |
| 9 | Kazakhstan (KAZ) | 0 | 0 | 2 | 2 |
| Totals (10 entries) | | 10 | 10 | 10 | 30 |

== Participating nations ==
A total of 172 athletes from 20 nations competed in rowing at the 2006 Asian Games:

- China (16)
- Chinese Taipei (11)
- Hong Kong (8)
- India (12)
- Indonesia (6)
- Iran (8)
- Iraq (2)
- Japan (13)
- Kazakhstan (15)
- Kuwait (5)
- North Korea (19)
- Pakistan (7)
- Philippines (4)
- Qatar (2)
- Singapore (1)
- South Korea (14)
- Sri Lanka (3)
- Thailand (4)
- Uzbekistan (12)
- Vietnam (10)
