= Rowing at the 2006 Asian Games – Men's double sculls =

Men's double sculls at the 2006 Asian Games
- Venue: West Bay Lagoon
- Date: 3–6 December 2006
- Competitors: 24 from 12 nations

Medalists
gold medal	Vladimir Chernenko; Ruslan Naurzaliev	Uzbekistan
silver medal	Kim Dal-ho; Ham Jung-wook	South Korea
bronze medal	Su Hui; Cui Yonghui	China

The men's double sculls competition at the 2006 Asian Games in Doha was held from 3 December to 6 December at the West Bay Lagoon.

Since Doha was scarce of water the distance had to be shortened from standard 2000 meters to 1000 meters.

== Schedule ==
All times are Arabia Standard Time (UTC+03:00)

Date	Time	Event
Sunday, 3 December 2006	09:50	Heats
Monday, 4 December 2006	09:40	Repechages
Tuesday, 5 December 2006	09:50	Semifinals
Wednesday, 6 December 2006	10:30	Finals

== Results ==
=== Heats ===
- Qualification: 1–2 → Semifinals A/B (SA/B), 3–4 → Repechages (R)

==== Heat 1 ====
Rank	Team	Time	Notes
1	China (CHN); Su Hui; Cui Yonghui	3:48.64	SA/B
2	South Korea (KOR); Kim Dal-ho; Ham Jung-wook	3:52.54	SA/B
3	Uzbekistan (UZB); Vladimir Chernenko; Ruslan Naurzaliev	3:59.74	R
4	Pakistan (PAK); Zohaib Zia Hashmi; Muhammad Akram	4:14.86	R

==== Heat 2 ====
Rank	Team	Time	Notes
1	Japan (JPN); Takehiro Kubo; Yoshimichi Nishimura	3:58.84	SA/B
2	Chinese Taipei (TPE); Wang Ming-hui; Chang Chien-hsiung	3:59.90	SA/B
3	Kazakhstan (KAZ); Mikhail Taskin; Yevgeniy Latypov	4:10.19	R
4	Kuwait (KUW); Mohammad Sabti; Raed Al-Failakawi	5:01.08	R

==== Heat 3 ====
Rank	Team	Time	Notes
1	Philippines (PHI); Benjamin Tolentino; Jose Rodriguez	3:58.27	SA/B
2	Hong Kong (HKG); Lok Kwan Hoi; Leung Chun Shek	3:59.39	SA/B
3	India (IND); Anil Kumar Mehrolia; Bajrang Lal Takhar	4:02.42	R
4	North Korea (PRK); Kim Hyon-u; Kim Myong-nam	4:16.56	R

=== Repechages ===
- Qualification: 1 → Semifinals A/B (SA/B), 2–3 → Final C (FC)

==== Repechage 1 ====
Rank	Team	Time	Notes
1	Uzbekistan (UZB); Vladimir Chernenko; Ruslan Naurzaliev	3:48.39	SA/B
2	North Korea (PRK); Kim Hyon-u; Kim Myong-nam	3:49.95	FC
3	Kazakhstan (KAZ); Mikhail Taskin; Yevgeniy Latypov	4:03.41	FC

==== Repechage 2 ====
Rank	Team	Time	Notes
1	India (IND); Anil Kumar Mehrolia; Bajrang Lal Takhar	3:53.91	SA/B
2	Pakistan (PAK); Zohaib Zia Hashmi; Muhammad Akram	4:05.49	FC
3	Kuwait (KUW); Mohammad Sabti; Raed Al-Failakawi	4:52.16	FC

=== Semifinals ===
- Qualification: 1–2 → Final A (FA), 3–4 → Final B (FB)

==== Semifinal A/B 1 ====
Rank	Team	Time	Notes
1	China (CHN); Su Hui; Cui Yonghui	3:27.91	FA
2	Uzbekistan (UZB); Vladimir Chernenko; Ruslan Naurzaliev	3:29.25	FA
3	Chinese Taipei (TPE); Wang Ming-hui; Chang Chien-hsiung	3:31.55	FB
4	Philippines (PHI); Benjamin Tolentino; Jose Rodriguez	3:34.84	FB

==== Semifinal A/B 2 ====
Rank	Team	Time	Notes
1	South Korea (KOR); Kim Dal-ho; Ham Jung-wook	3:31.05	FA
2	India (IND); Anil Kumar Mehrolia; Bajrang Lal Takhar	3:33.33	FA
3	Japan (JPN); Takehiro Kubo; Yoshimichi Nishimura	3:38.76	FB
4	Hong Kong (HKG); Lok Kwan Hoi; Leung Chun Shek	3:39.74	FB

=== Finals ===
==== Final C ====
Rank	Team	Time
1	Kazakhstan (KAZ); Mikhail Taskin; Yevgeniy Latypov	3:26.04
2	North Korea (PRK); Kim Hyon-u; Kim Myong-nam	3:26.22
3	Pakistan (PAK); Zohaib Zia Hashmi; Muhammad Akram	3:39.48
4	Kuwait (KUW); Mohammad Sabti; Raed Al-Failakawi	4:04.25

==== Final B ====
Rank	Team	Time
1	Philippines (PHI); Benjamin Tolentino; Jose Rodriguez	3:22.49
2	Chinese Taipei (TPE); Wang Ming-hui; Chang Chien-hsiung	3:22.77
3	Japan (JPN); Takehiro Kubo; Yoshimichi Nishimura	3:23.98
4	Hong Kong (HKG); Lok Kwan Hoi; Leung Chun Shek	3:25.77

==== Final A ====
Rank	Team	Time
1st place, gold medalist(s)	Uzbekistan (UZB); Vladimir Chernenko; Ruslan Naurzaliev	3:16.74
2nd place, silver medalist(s)	South Korea (KOR); Kim Dal-ho; Ham Jung-wook	3:20.01
3rd place, bronze medalist(s)	China (CHN); Su Hui; Cui Yonghui	3:22.47
4	India (IND); Anil Kumar Mehrolia; Bajrang Lal Takhar	3:25.90
