= Rowing at the 2011 Pan American Games – Men's single sculls =

Rowing – Men's single sculls at the 2011 Pan American Games
- Venue: Canoe & Rowing Course
- Dates: October 15 - October 19
- Competitors: 12 from 12 nations

Medalists
Gold medal	Ángel Fournier	Cuba
Silver medal	Patrick Loliger	Mexico
Bronze medal	Emilio Torres	Venezuela

The men's single sculls rowing event at the 2011 Pan American Games was held from October 15–19 at the Canoe & Rowing Course in Ciudad Guzman. The defending Pan American Games champion was Santiago Fernández of Argentina.

== Schedule ==
All times are Central Standard Time (UTC-6).

Date	Time	Round
October 15, 2011	11:00	Heats
October 15, 2011	16:50	Repechages
October 19, 2011	10:34	Final B
October 19, 2011	10:42	Final A

== Results ==
=== Heats ===
==== Heat 1 ====
Rank	Rowers	Country	Time	Notes
1	Ángel Fournier	Cuba	7:13.41	FA
2	Emilio Torres	Venezuela	7:20.46	R
3	Michael Braithwaite	Canada	7:26.04	R
4	Kenneth Jurkowski	United States	7:28.27	R
5	Jhonatan Esquivel	Uruguay	7:54.38	R
6	Rodrigo Ideus	Colombia	8:09.23	R

==== Heat 2 ====
Rank	Rowers	Country	Time	Notes
1	Patrick Loliger	Mexico	7:07.60	FA
2	Oscar Mauricio Vazquez	Chile	7:17.35	R
3	Victor Aspillaga	Peru	7:30.30	R
4	Cristian Rosso	Argentina	7:36.93	R
5	Roberto Carlos Lopez	El Salvador	7:40.09	R
6	Reynaldo Sosa	Paraguay	7:51.40	R

=== Repechages ===
==== Repechage 1 ====
Rank	Rowers	Country	Time	Notes
1	Cristian Rosso	Argentina	7:16.07	FA
2	Emilio Torres	Venezuela	7:20.61	FA
3	Victor Aspillaga	Peru	7:29.91	FB
4	Jhonatan Esquivel	Uruguay	7:45.16	FB
5	Rodrigo Ideus	Colombia	7:51.95	FB

==== Repechage 2 ====
Rank	Rowers	Country	Time	Notes
1	Kenneth Jurkowski	United States	7:20.52	FA
2	Oscar Mauricio Vazquez	Chile	7:24.68	FA
3	Michael Braithwaite	Canada	7:35.56	FB
4	Roberto Carlos Lopez	El Salvador	7:36.57	FB
5	Reynaldo Sosa	Paraguay	7:40.59	FB

=== Final B ===
Rank	Rowers	Country	Time	Notes
7	Michael Braithwaite	Canada	7:13.45	
8	Victor Aspillaga	Peru	7:17.59	
9	Roberto Carlos Lopez	El Salvador	7:21.01	
10	Jhonatan Esquivel	Uruguay	7:25.48	
11	Rodrigo Ideus	Colombia	7:28.79	
12	Reynaldo Sosa	Paraguay	7:29.38	

=== Final A ===
Rank	Rowers	Country	Time	Notes
1st place, gold medalist(s)	Ángel Fournier	Cuba	7:02.94	
2nd place, silver medalist(s)	Patrick Loliger	Mexico	7:05.28	
3rd place, bronze medalist(s)	Emilio Torres	Venezuela	7:07.03	
4	Oscar Mauricio Vazquez	Chile	7:09.33	
5	Cristian Rosso	Argentina	7:15.91	
6	Kenneth Jurkowski	United States	7:20.55	
