= Rowing at the 2007 All-Africa Games =

- Location: Algiers, Algeria

Rowing was part of the 2007 All-Africa Games competition schedule.

== Results ==
=== Men ===
Event	Gold		Silver		Bronze	
Single Sculls	Ali Ibrahim; Egypt	7:21.85	Shaun Keeling; South Africa	7:26.91	Chaouki Dries; Algeria	7:37.08
Double Sculls	Mohamed Gomaa; El-Husseiny Farag; Egypt	6:53.54	Sean Irwin; Murray Chandler; South Africa	6:58.08	Samir Alrbi-Aloui; Abdelkarim Amiche; Algeria	7:08.11
Lightweight single scull	Mohamed Aich; Algeria	7:31.73	Anthony Paladin; South Africa	7:40.81	Mohamed Abdulah el-Moaty; Egypt	7:51.95
Lightweight double scull	Kamel Ait Daoud; Mohamed Riad Garidi; Algeria	7:02.20	Abdullah el-Mohsen Massoud; Islam Mohamed; Egypt	7:04.43	Ryan Colahan; Liam Colahan; Zimbabwe	7:30.73

=== Women ===
Event	Gold		Silver		Bronze	
Single Sculls	Adriana Geyser; South Africa	8:14.86	Ibtissem Trimech; Tunisia	8:22.72	Imen Mustapha Hassen; Egypt	8:29.12
Double Sculls	Hafida Chaouch; Besma Dries; Algeria	7:52.46	Nomthandazo Sibiya; Hayley Arthur; South Africa	8:10.51	Sara Baraka; Manal Hassan; Egypt	8:13.21
Lightweight single scull	Ibtissem Trimech; Tunisia	8:37.84	Catherine Shan; South Africa	8:44.14	Ola Ahmed; Egypt	8:53.08
Lightweight double scull	Alexandra White; Catherine Shan; South Africa	7:46.73	Amina Rouba; Hafida Chaouch; Algeria	7:52.97	Asmaa Sayed; Heba Ahmed; Egypt	8:06.15
