= Vonarburg =

Vonarburg is a surname. Notable people with the surname include:

- André Vonarburg (born 1978), Swiss rower
- Élisabeth Vonarburg (born 1947), French writer
