= Gustavo Salcedo =

Gustavo Salcedo can refer to:

- Gustavo Salcedo (rower) (born 1982), Peruvian rower
- Gustavo Salcedo (swimmer) (born 1952), Mexican swimmer
