= Matthew Lidaywa Mwange =

Kenyan rower

Personal information
- Nationality: Kenya
- Born: 2 January 1979 (age 47) Vihiga, Kenya
- Height: 2.01 m (6 ft 7 in)
- Weight: 86 kg (190 lb)

Sport
- Sport: Rowing
- Club: Navy RC Kenya
- Coached by: Joshua Kandagor

Matthew Lidaywa Mwange (born 2 January 1979 in Vihiga) is a Kenyan single sculls rower. He is also a member of Navy RC Kenya Rowing Club, and is coached and trained by Joshua Kandagor. Mwange stands 2.01 metres (6 ft 7 in) tall and weighs 86 kilograms (190 lb).

Mwange represented Kenya at the 2008 Summer Olympics in Beijing, where he competed as the nation's lone rower in the men's single sculls, an event which was later dominated by defending Olympic champion Olaf Tufte of Norway. He won the F-final, yet placed thirtieth overall in this event by forty seconds ahead of Honduras' Norberto Bernárdez Ávila, with a time of 7:52.59.
