= Peru at the 2004 Summer Olympics =

- IOC code: PER
- NOC: Peruvian Olympic Committee
- Website: www.coperu.org (in Spanish)

in Athens
- Competitors: 12 in 10 sports
- Flag bearer: Francisco Boza
- Medals: Gold 0 Silver 0 Bronze 0 Total 0

Summer Olympics appearances (overview)
- 1900; 1904–1932; 1936; 1948; 1952; 1956; 1960; 1964; 1968; 1972; 1976; 1980; 1984; 1988; 1992; 1996; 2000; 2004; 2008; 2012; 2016; 2020; 2024

Peru competed at the 2004 Summer Olympics in Athens, Greece, from 13 to 29 August 2004. This was the nation's fifteenth appearance at the Olympics, except the 1952 Summer Olympics in Helsinki.

Comité Olímpico Peruano sent the nation's smallest ever team to the Games since the 1956 Summer Olympics in Melbourne. A total of twelve athletes, seven men and five women, competed in ten different sports. Two athletes from the Peruvian team had previously competed in Sydney: butterfly swimmer Juan Pablo Valdivieso and 1984 Olympic silver medalist Francisco Boza in men's trap shooting (who became the first Peruvian athlete to participate in seven Olympic Games, surpassing a single edition short of a historic record by fellow shooter Juan Giha). Being the oldest and most sophisticated member of the team, Boza was assigned by the committee to become the nation's flag bearer in the opening ceremony. Peru, however, failed to win a single Olympic medal since the 1992 Summer Olympics in Barcelona, where Giha won the silver in the mixed skeet.

== Athletics ==
Peruvian athletes achieved qualifying standards in the following athletics events (up to a maximum of 3 athletes in each event at the 'A' Standard, and 1 at the 'B' Standard).

Key

- Note – Ranks given for track events are within the athlete's heat only
- Q = Qualified for the next round
- q = Qualified for the next round as a fastest loser or, in field events, by position without achieving the qualifying target
- NR = National record
- N/A = Round not applicable for the event
- Bye = Athlete not required to compete in round

Men
Field events

Athlete	Event	Qualification		Final	
Athlete	Event	Distance	Position	Distance	Position
Alfredo Deza	High jump	2.10	35	Did not advance	

Women
Track & road events

Athlete	Event	Heat		Final	
Athlete	Event	Result	Rank	Result	Rank
Inés Melchor	5000 m	17:08.07	21	Did not advance	

== Badminton ==
Athlete	Event	Round of 32	Round of 16	Quarterfinal	Semifinal	Final / BM	
Athlete	Event	Opposition Score	Opposition Score	Opposition Score	Opposition Score	Opposition Score	Rank
Lorena Blanco	Women's singles	Wang C (HKG); L 1–11, 4–11	Did not advance				

== Rowing ==
Peruvian rowers qualified the following boats:

Men

Athlete	Event	Heats		Repechage		Semifinals		Final	
Athlete	Event	Time	Rank	Time	Rank	Time	Rank	Time	Rank
Gustavo Salcedo	Single sculls	7:29.06	4 R	7:05.08	3 SD/E	7:09.06	1 FD	7:03.24	21

Qualification Legend: FA=Final A (medal); FB=Final B (non-medal); FC=Final C (non-medal); FD=Final D (non-medal); FE=Final E (non-medal); FF=Final F (non-medal); SA/B=Semifinals A/B; SC/D=Semifinals C/D; SE/F=Semifinals E/F; R=Repechage

== Sailing ==
Peruvian sailors qualified one boat for each of the following events.

Open

Athlete	Event	Race											Net points	Final rank
Athlete	Event	1	2	3	4	5	6	7	8	9	10	M*	Net points	Final rank
Augusto Nicolini	Laser	38	35	16	39	31	28	38	33	~~DSQ~~	33	38	329	38

M = Medal race; OCS = On course side of the starting line; DSQ = Disqualified; DNF = Did not finish; DNS= Did not start; RDG = Redress given

== Shooting ==
One Peruvian shooter qualified to compete in the following events:

Men

Athlete	Event	Qualification		Final	
Athlete	Event	Points	Rank	Points	Rank
Francisco Boza	Trap	119	=9	Did not advance	
Francisco Boza	Double trap	121	24	Did not advance	

== Swimming ==
Peruvian swimmers earned qualifying standards in the following events (up to a maximum of 2 swimmers in each event at the A-standard time, and 1 at the B-standard time):

Men

Athlete	Event	Heat		Semifinal		Final	
Athlete	Event	Time	Rank	Time	Rank	Time	Rank
Juan Pablo Valdivieso	100 m butterfly	55.98	47	Did not advance			
Juan Pablo Valdivieso	200 m butterfly	2:02.79	28	Did not advance			

Women

Athlete	Event	Heat		Semifinal		Final	
Athlete	Event	Time	Rank	Time	Rank	Time	Rank
Valeria Silva	100 m breaststroke	1:13.52	37	Did not advance			

== Table tennis ==
Peru qualified a single table tennis player.

Athlete	Event	Round 1	Round 2	Round 3	Round 4	Quarterfinals	Semifinals	Final / BM	
Athlete	Event	Opposition Result	Opposition Result	Opposition Result	Opposition Result	Opposition Result	Opposition Result	Opposition Result	Rank
Marisol Espineira	Women's singles	Miao (AUS); L 2–4	Did not advance						

== Tennis ==
Peru nominated a male tennis player to compete in the tournament.

Athlete	Event	Round of 64	Round of 32	Round of 16	Quarterfinals	Semifinals	Final / BM	
Athlete	Event	Opposition Score	Opposition Score	Opposition Score	Opposition Score	Opposition Score	Opposition Score	Rank
Luis Horna	Men's singles	Grosjean (FRA); L 2–6, 5–7	Did not advance					

== Weightlifting ==
Peru qualified a single weightlifter.

Athlete	Event	Snatch		Clean & Jerk		Total	Rank
Athlete	Event	Result	Rank	Result	Rank	Total	Rank
Manuela Rejas	Women's +75 kg	95	=10	125	=10	220	10

== Wrestling ==
Key

- VT – Victory by Fall.
- PP - Decision by Points - the loser with technical points.
- PO - Decision by Points - the loser without technical points.

Men's Greco-Roman

Athlete	Event	Elimination Pool			Quarterfinal	Semifinal	Final / BM	
Athlete	Event	Opposition Result	Opposition Result	Rank	Opposition Result	Opposition Result	Opposition Result	Rank
Sidney Guzman	−60 kg	Sasamoto (JPN); L 0–4 ^{ST}	Štefanek (SCG); W 3–1 ^{PP}	2	Did not advance			15

== See also ==
- Peru at the 2003 Pan American Games
- Peru at the 2004 Summer Paralympics
