= Su Hui =

Su Hui may refer to:

- Su Hui (poet), 4th-century Chinese poet
- Su Hui (politician), vice-chairwoman of the Chinese People's Political Consultative Conference
- Su Hui (rower), Chinese rower
