= Alan Campbell (rower) =

British sculler

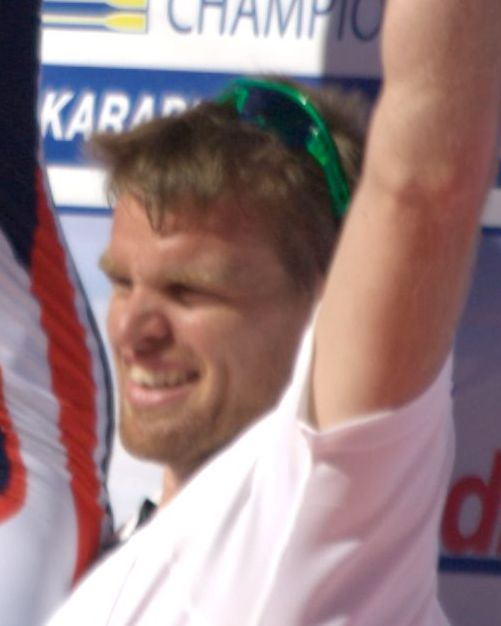
- Campbell in 2010

Personal information
- Nationality: British
- Born: 9 May 1983 (age 43) Coleraine, County Londonderry, Northern Ireland
- Height: 1.91 m (6 ft 3 in)
- Weight: 95 kg (209 lb)

Sport
- Country: Great Britain
- Sport: Rowing
- Event(s): Men's quadruple sculls; men's single sculls
- Club: Tideway Scullers School

Achievements and titles
- Olympic finals: 2012, m1x, 3rd, 2004, m4x, 12th; 2008, m1x, 5th
- World finals: 2005, M4x, 7th; 2006, M1x, 6th; 2007, M1x, 4th
Medal record
Men's rowing
Representing Great Britain
Olympic Games
Bronze medal – third place	2012 London	Single sculls
World Championships
Silver medal – second place	2009 Poznan	Single sculls
Bronze medal – third place	2010 Karapiro	Single sculls
Bronze medal – third place	2011 Bled	Single sculls

Alan W Campbell (born 9 May 1983) is a British sculler.

== Biography ==
Alan Campbell was born in Coleraine, Northern Ireland, and started rowing for his school, Coleraine Academical Institution for Boys. ON leaving, he joined Bann Rowing Club Coleraine. Years later he then left for London and joined Tideway Scullers School.

In 2003, Campbell left his degree and won the Diamond Sculls at Henley Royal Regatta. He then made his international debut at the World U23 Championships in 2003, where he was forced to switch from the double to the single sculls five days before the regatta when his sculling partner became ill. Despite this he finished 8th.

He competed in the quadruple sculls at the 2004 Summer Olympics, finishing in 12th place. In 2005, Campbell won the men's single at the GB Selection Trials, and raced in the men's quad for the World Cup series, winning the bronze at Lucerne regatta. At the 2005 World Championships in Gifu, Japan, the men's quad narrowly failed to reach the final.

In 2006, Campbell switched to competing in the men's heavyweight single, and won the Munich world cup regatta ahead of Olaf Tufte. He also finished second in Lucerne, behind Mahé Drysdale, and fourth in Poznań, to win the overall world cup standings.

Campbell competed in the 2008 Olympics in Beijing where he participated in the Men's Single Scull; he led up to 1000m, where he was overtaken by Olaf Tufte and finished fifth. Prior to the games, he had picked up a virus that required knee surgery, which left him on crutches for three weeks in June 2008.

In 2011, he won his third Diamond Challenge Sculls title (the premier event for single sculls) at the Henley Royal Regatta.

He competed at the 2011 World Rowing Championships in Bled, where he won a bronze medal in the singles scull.

In the 2012 London Olympics, Campbell won the bronze medal in the men's single sculls after moving into the medals with 500m to go against the Swedish national entry, Lassi Karonen. Alan Campbell, the Olympic single scull bronze medallist in 2012, dominated 5 km GB Rowing Team Assessment in Boston, Lincs to win the open men's single scull event in a time of 17:03.23.

After winning the GB Rowing Team Trials for a ninth time, Campbell was once again selected in the men’s single scull for the 2016 season. He had to settle for ninth place at the European Championships in Brandenburg but improved to fifth at the World Cup in Lucerne before returning to the podium with a fine performance at the Poznan World Cup, winning bronze.

At the Rio 2016 Olympic Games, Campbell won his heat and was runner-up in his quarter-final but had to settle for fourth place in his semi-final. Vertigo brought on by a head cold meant Campbell was unable to race in the B final, meaning he finished 12th overall.

== Events ==
Henley Royal Regatta

- 2003 – Diamond Challenge Sculls racing as Tideway Scullers School
- 2007 – Diamond Challenge Sculls racing as Tideway Scullers School
- 2011 – Diamond Challenge Sculls racing as Tideway Scullers School

Wingfield Sculls

- 2006
- 2009
- 2010
- 2012

Scullers Head of the River

- 2004 – 3rd
- 2008 – 1st
- 2012 – 1st

Alan Campbell also works as a speaker.
