= Ian Lawson =

Ian Lawson may refer to:

- Ian Lawson (footballer, born 1977), English footballer; played for Huddersfield Town, Blackpool, Bury and Stockport County
- Ian Lawson (footballer, born 1939), English footballer; played for Burnley, Leeds United, Crystal Palace and Port Vale in the 1950s and 1960s
- Ian Lawson (rower) (born 1977), British Olympic rower
