= Rowing at the 2007 Pan American Games – Men's single sculls =

The Men's Single Sculls took place at the Lagoa Rodrigo de Freitas. The heats and repechages happened on July 14 and the Finals on July 17.

== Medals ==
Medalists	Gold:	Silver:	Bronze:
Medalists	Santiago Fernández; Argentina	Yoennis Hernández; Cuba	Marcelus dos Santos; Brazil

== Heats ==
=== Heat 1 ===
Heat 1				June 14 8:40	
#	Lane	Name	NOC	Time	Obs
1	1	Santiago Fernández	Argentina	7:05.97	FA
2	2	Marcelus dos Santos	Brazil	7:28.31	R
3	3	Cesar Chavez	El Salvador	8:06.74	R
4	4	Norberto Avila	Honduras	9:07.72	R
	5	Francisco Anderson	Panama	DNS	

=== Heat 2 ===
Heat 2				June 14 8:50	
#	Lane	Name	NOC	Time	Obs
1	2	Yoennis Hernández	Cuba	7:08.12	FA
2	5	Jamie Schroeder	United States	7:14.31	R
3	3	Patrick Alexandre Salas	Mexico	7:16.60	R
4	1	Oscar Vasquez	Chile	7:17.38	R
5	4	Dhison Hernandez	Venezuela	7:26.92	R

== Repechages ==
=== Repechage 1 ===
Repechage 1				June 14 16:30	
#	Lane	Name	NOC	Time	Obs
1	3	Patrick Alexandre Salas	Mexico	7:18.24	FA
2	2	Marcelus dos Santos	Brazil	7:20.61	FA
3	4	Dhison Hernandez	Venezuela	7:23.32	FB
4	1	Norberto Avila	Honduras	9:15.19	FB

=== Repechage 2 ===
Repechage 2				June 14 16:40	
#	Lane	Name	NOC	Time	Obs
1	1	Oscar Vasquez	Chile	7:18.57	FA
2	2	Jamie Schroeder	United States	7:26.36	FA
3	3	Cesar Chavez	El Salvador	7:50.31	FB

== Finals ==
=== Final B ===
Final B				June 17 9:15
#	Lane	Name	NOC	Time
1	2	Dhison Hernandez	Venezuela	7:34.06
2	3	Cesar Chavez	El Salvador	8:01.51
3	1	Norberto Avila	Honduras	10:17.30

=== Final A ===
Final A				June 17 9:25
#	Lane	Name	NOC	Time
1st place, gold medalist(s)	3	Santiago Fernández	Argentina	6:59.41
2nd place, silver medalist(s)	4	Yoennis Hernández	Cuba	7:04.47
3rd place, bronze medalist(s)	1	Marcelus dos Santos	Brazil	7:05.47
4	5	Oscar Vasquez	Chile	7:07.22
5	6	Jamie Schroeder	United States	7:13.63
6	2	Patrick Alexandre Salas	Mexico	7:15.72
