= Dirk Lippits =

Dutch rower

Medal record

Men's rowing

Representing the Netherlands

Olympic Games
Silver medal – second place	2000 Sydney	Quadruple sculls

Dirk Reinier Lippits (born 3 May 1977) is a Dutch rower, born in Geldrop, North Brabant. He won a silver medal in the 2000 Summer Olympics in the Men's Quadruple Sculls. In 2004, Lippits took part in the men's single sculls, finishing fourth in the C Final.
