= Rowing at the 2010 Central American and Caribbean Games =

Event held in Mayagüez, Puerto Rico

- Venue: Lake Cerrillos
- Location: Veracruz, Mexico
- Dates: 25-28 July

The Rowing competition at the 2010 Central American and Caribbean Games was held in Mayagüez, Puerto Rico.

The tournament was scheduled to be held from 25–28 July at the Lake Cerrillos in Ponce.

== Medal summary ==
=== Men's events ===
Event	Gold		Silver		Bronze	
Single Sculls	Patrick Loliger; Mexico	7:14.16	Jose Guipe; Venezuela	7:20.21	Herman Garcia; Guatemala	7:35.31
Lightweight Single Sculls	Jose Guipe; Venezuela	7:04.31	Alan Armenta; Mexico	7:05.35	Herman Garcia; Guatemala	7:17.11
Double Sculls	Mexico	6:37.60	Venezuela	6:40.77	Guatemala	6:53.49
Lightweight Double Sculls	Mexico	6:40.31	Guatemala	6:45.80	El Salvador	6:48.99
Lightweight Double	Mexico	6:47.80	Guatemala	6:53.87	Venezuela	7:03.85
Lightweight Four	Mexico	6:13.41	Guatemala	6:15.77	Venezuela	6:16.95

=== Women's events ===
Event	Gold		Silver		Bronze	
Single Sculls	Analicia Ramirez; Mexico	8:26.71	Ana Vargas; El Salvador	8:33.34	Kimberly Meneses; Venezuela	8:41.45
Lightweight Single Sculls	Lila Peréz; Mexico	7:51.41	Marta Figueora; El Salvador	7:53.32	Kimberly Meneses; Venezuela	8:32.00
Double Sculls	Mexico	7:16.17	El Salvador	7:25.98	Puerto Rico	7:40.11
Lightweight Double Sculls	Mexico	7:13.84	El Salvador	7:23.94	Venezuela	7:27.62
Open W4x	Mexico	6:50.70	El Salvador	7:04.72	Guatemala	7:07.92
