= Liam Colahan =

Zimbabwean rower (born 1990)

Personal information
- Nationality: Zimbabwean
- Born: 20 May 1990 (age 36) Harare, Zimbabwe

Sport
- Sport: Rowing
Medal record
Men's Rowing
Representing Zimbabwe
All African Games
Bronze medal – third place	2007 All-Africa Games	Lightweight double sculls

Liam Colahan (born 20 May 1990) is a former Zimbabwean rower. Along with his brother Ryan, he won a bronze medal in the men's lightweight double sculls at the 2007 All-Africa Games. He also competed at the 2007 and 2008 World Rowing Junior Championships.
