= Daniel Sosa =

Paraguayan rower

Daniel Sosa Bertoni
Personal information
- Nationality: Paraguay
- Born: 18 January 1983 (age 43)
- Height: 1.87 m (6 ft 1 1/2 in)
- Weight: 78 kg (172 lb)

Sport
- Sport: rowing
- Club: CNR Mbigua

Daniel Sosa Bertoni (18 January 1983) is a Paraguayan rower who competed at the 2004 Summer Olympics.

Sosa competed in the single sculls event at the Olympics, where he came last in his heat of five rowers, and overall he finished in 28th position.

Seven years later and Sosa was competing in the single sculls at the 2011 World Rowing Championships in Bled, Slovenia, and again in his first round heat he finished in fifth place and didn't advance any further.
