= Paul Etia Ndoumbe =

Cameroonian rower

Paul Etia Ndoumbe (born 20 April 1984 in Douala, Cameroon) is a Cameroonian rower. He competed in the single sculls event at the 2008 Summer Olympics where he finished 28th and in the single sculls event at the 2012 Summer Olympics where he finished 32nd.
