= Ibrahim Githaiga =

Kenyan rower

Personal information
- Nationality: Kenyan
- Born: 23 March 1969 (age 56); Eldoret, Kenya

Sport
- Sport: Rowing

Ibrahim Githaiga (born 23 March 1969) is a Kenyan rower. He competed in the men's single sculls event at the 2004 Summer Olympics.
