= Ryan Colahan =

Zimbabwean rower

Personal information
- Nationality: Zimbabwean
- Born: 22 February 1989 (age 37) Harare, Zimbabwe

Sport
- Sport: Rowing
Medal record
Men's Rowing
Representing Zimbabwe
All African Games
Bronze medal – third place	2007 All-Africa Games	Lightweight double sculls

Ryan Colahan (born 22 February 1989) is a former Zimbabwean rower. Along with his brother Liam, he won a bronze medal in the men's lightweight double sculls at the 2007 All-Africa Games. He also competed at the 2006 and 2007 World Rowing Junior Championships.
