= Norberto Bernárdez Ávila =

Honduran rower (born 1987)

Norberto Bernárdez
Personal information
- Full name: Norberto Bernárdez Ávila
- Nationality: Honduras
- Born: 20 April 1987 (age 39) Honduras
- Height: 1.76 m (5 ft 9 1/2 in)
- Weight: 75 kg (165 lb)

Sport
- Sport: Rowing
- Event: Single sculls

Norberto Bernárdez Ávila (born 20 April 1987) is a Honduran single sculls rower. He competed for the nation in international competition. Bernardez represented Honduras at the 2008 Summer Olympics in Beijing, where he competed as the nation's lone rower in the men's single sculls. He was the first rower to compete for Honduras at an Olympic Games. Overall, Bernárdez reached Final F and placed 31st out of the 32 rowers that competed in the event.

== Biography ==
Norberto Bernárdez Ávila was born on 20 April 1987 in Honduras. As a single sculls rower, he represented Honduras in international competition.

Bernárdez was selected to compete for Honduras at the 2008 Summer Olympics held in Beijing, China. At the 2008 Summer Games, she was entered in one event, the men's single sculls. He was the first rower to represent Honduras at an Olympic Games. As of the 2024 Summer Olympics, he remains as the sole rower to have done so for Honduras.

He first competed in the heats of the event on 9 August 2008 in the third heat against five other rowers. There, he recorded a time of 9:01.27, placed last, and qualified for Semifinals E/F. He competed in the semifinal two days later on 11 August 2008 in the first Semifinal E/F against three other rowers. There, he recorded a time of 8:29.65 and again placed last, advancing to Final F. He competed in the final four days later on 15 August 2008 against one other athlete, Matthew Lidaywa Mwange of Kenya. There, Bernárdez placed behind Mwange with a time of 8:32.22. Overall, Bernárdez placed 31st out of the 32 rowers that competed in the event.
