= Ian Lawson (rower) =

British rower

Personal information
- Nationality: British
- Born: 4 March 1977 (age 48); Bradford, England

Sport
- Sport: Rowing

Ian James Lawson (born 4 March 1977) is a British rower.

== Biography ==
Lawson graduated from Durham University in 1998. He was a product of the high performance programme at Durham University Boat Club.

He competed in the men's single sculls event at the 2004 Summer Olympics.

In 2008, he won the Diamond Challenge Sculls (the premier event for single sculls) at the Henley Royal Regatta.
