= Davor Mizerit =

Slovenian rower (born 1981)

Personal information
- Born: 4 January 1981 (age 45) Koper, Slovenia, Yugoslavia
Medal record
Men's rowing
Representing Slovenia
World Championships
| Silver medal – second place | 2005 Gifu | Quadruple sculls |
Mediterranean Games
| Bronze medal – third place | 2005 Almería | Single sculls |

Davor Mizerit (born 4 January 1981) is a Slovenian rower, who competed for his native country at the 2004 Summer Olympics in Athens, Greece.

He won the bronze medal in the Men's Single Sculls event at the 2005 Mediterranean Games in Almería, Spain.

He was born in Koper and is a member of the Veslaski Klub Nautilus Koper.
