= Dhison Hernández =

Venezuelan rower

Personal information
- Born: 14 October 1984 (age 41) Caracas, Venezuela

Sport
- Sport: Rowing

Dhison Hernández (born 14 October 1984) is a Venezuelan rower. He competed in the men's single sculls event at the 2008 Summer Olympics.
