= Raphael Hartl =

Austrian rower

Personal information
- Nationality: Austrian
- Born: 26 September 1975 (age 51) Linz, Austria

Sport
- Sport: Rowing

Raphael Hartl (born 26 September 1975) is an Austrian rower. He competed at the 2000 Summer Olympics and the 2004 Summer Olympics.
