= Patrick Loliger =

Mexican rower (born 1985)

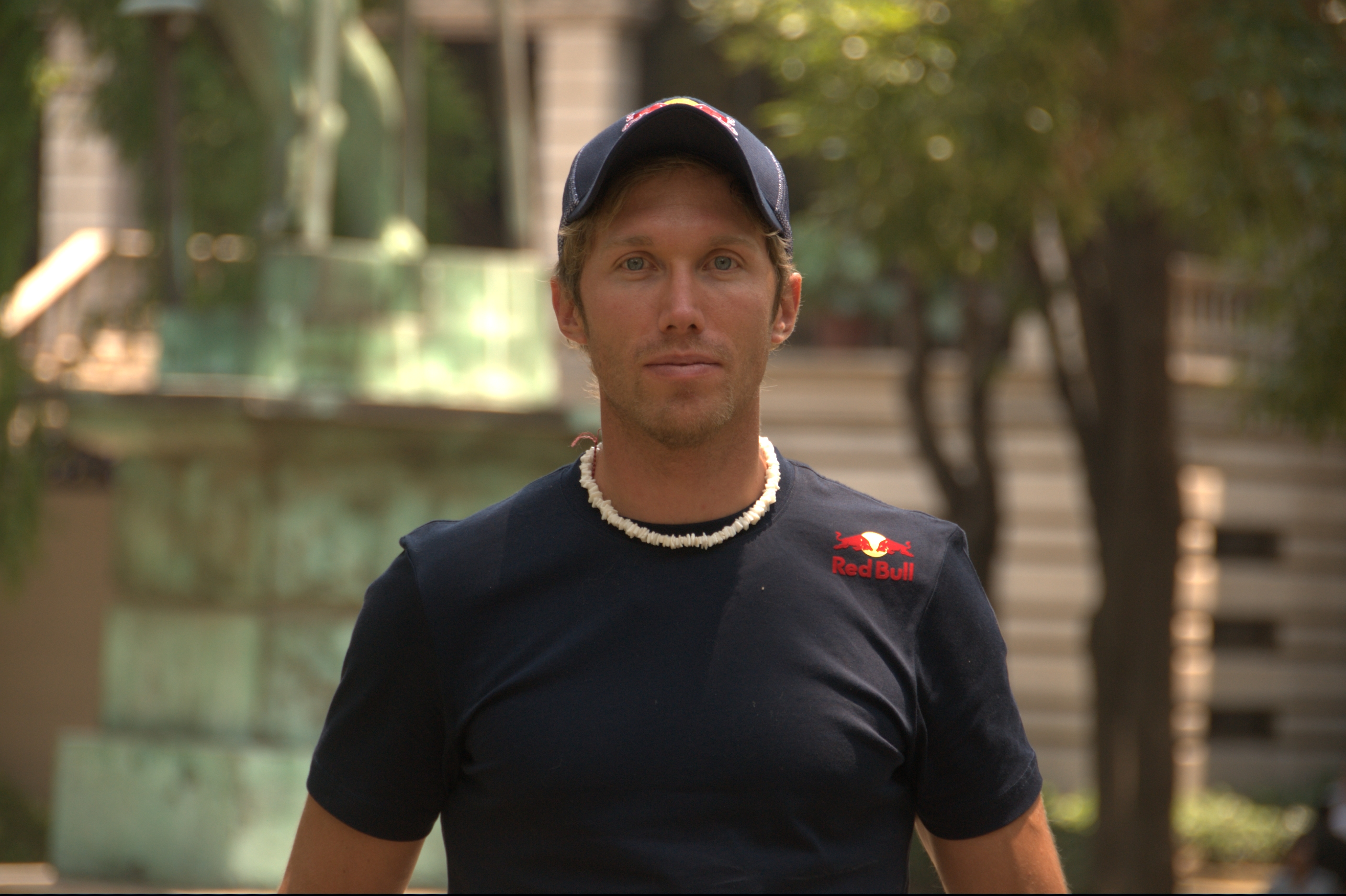
- Loliger at the Monterrey Institute of Technology and Higher Education, Mexico City

Personal information
- Born: 20 March 1985 (age 41) Mexico City, Mexico

Sport
- Sport: Rowing
Medal record
Men's rowing
Representing Mexico
Pan American Games
Silver medal – second place	2011 Guadalajara	Single sculls
Bronze medal – third place	2011 Guadalajara	Quad sculls
Central American and Caribbean Games
Gold medal – first place	2010 Mayagüez	Single sculls
Silver medal – second place	2006 Cartagena	Single sculls
Silver medal – second place	2010 Veracruz	Double sculls
Silver medal – second place	2010 Veracruz	Quadruple sculls
Royal Canadian Henley Regatta
Gold medal – first place	2005 Canada	Quad sculls
Silver medal – second place	2000 Canada	Double sculls
Silver medal – second place	2001 Canada	Quad sculls
Silver medal – second place	2004 Canada	Single sculls
Silver medal – second place	2004 Canada	Quad sculls
Silver medal – second place	2005 Canada	Double sculls
Bronze medal – third place	2001 Canada	Double sculls
Regatta of America
Gold medal – first place	2000 Canada	Double sculls
Canammex
Gold medal – first place	2002 USA	Double sculls
Gold medal – first place	2002 USA	Quad sculls
Silver medal – second place	2001 Canada	Quad sculls
USA National
Gold medal – first place	2005 USA	Single sculls
Gold medal – first place	2005 USA	Double sculls
Gold medal – first place	2005 USA	Quad sculls
Grand Prix
Bronze medal – third place	2007 USA	Single sculls
Bronze medal – third place	2007 USA	Quad sculls
Ratzeburg Regatta
Gold medal – first place	2010 Germany	Single sculls
Duisburg Regatta
Bronze medal – third place	2008 Germany	Single sculls
International Regatta
Gold medal – first place	2008 Belgium	Single sculls
Nations Cup
Silver medal – second place	2009 Italy	Single sculls
Bronze medal – third place	2010 Italy	Single sculls
Bronze medal – third place	2011 Italy	Single sculls
Silver medal – second place	2012 Russia	Single sculls
Gold medal – first place	2013 Netherlands	pair
Gold medal – first place	2014 Netherlands	pair
Gold medal – first place	2016 USA Nationals	Single
Bronze medal – third place	2016 Spain Nationals	double
Bronze medal – third place	2016 World Championships Monaco	Single
Gold medal – first place	2018 World Championships USA	Indoor

Patrick Alexandre Ernst Loliger Salas (born June 20, 1985) is a Mexican rower who competed at the 2008 Summer Olympics and the 2012 Summer Olympics.

Loliger was born in Mexico City. He is the second child of Rolf Loliger (Swiss) and Angelica Salas (Mexican). He grew up in a very family-oriented environment, and began practicing sports at Real Club España. He has a degree in International Business from Tecnológico de Monterrey (Campus Ciudad de Mexico.

Loliger has earned a handful of medals in regattas all around the world, including the Ratzeburger and Wedau Regattas in Germany, the Gent in Belgium, the Paolo D'Aloja in Italy, and most recently, he became the first Mexican rower to win a medal at the World University Championship in Kazan, Russia.

He earned two medals at the 2011 Pan American Games in Guadalajara, and his biggest achievement took place in Argentina later than year when he beat his biggest competitor and role model, Santiago Fernández, who placed 4th in the 2004 Summer Olympics.
