= Lassi Karonen =

Swedish rower

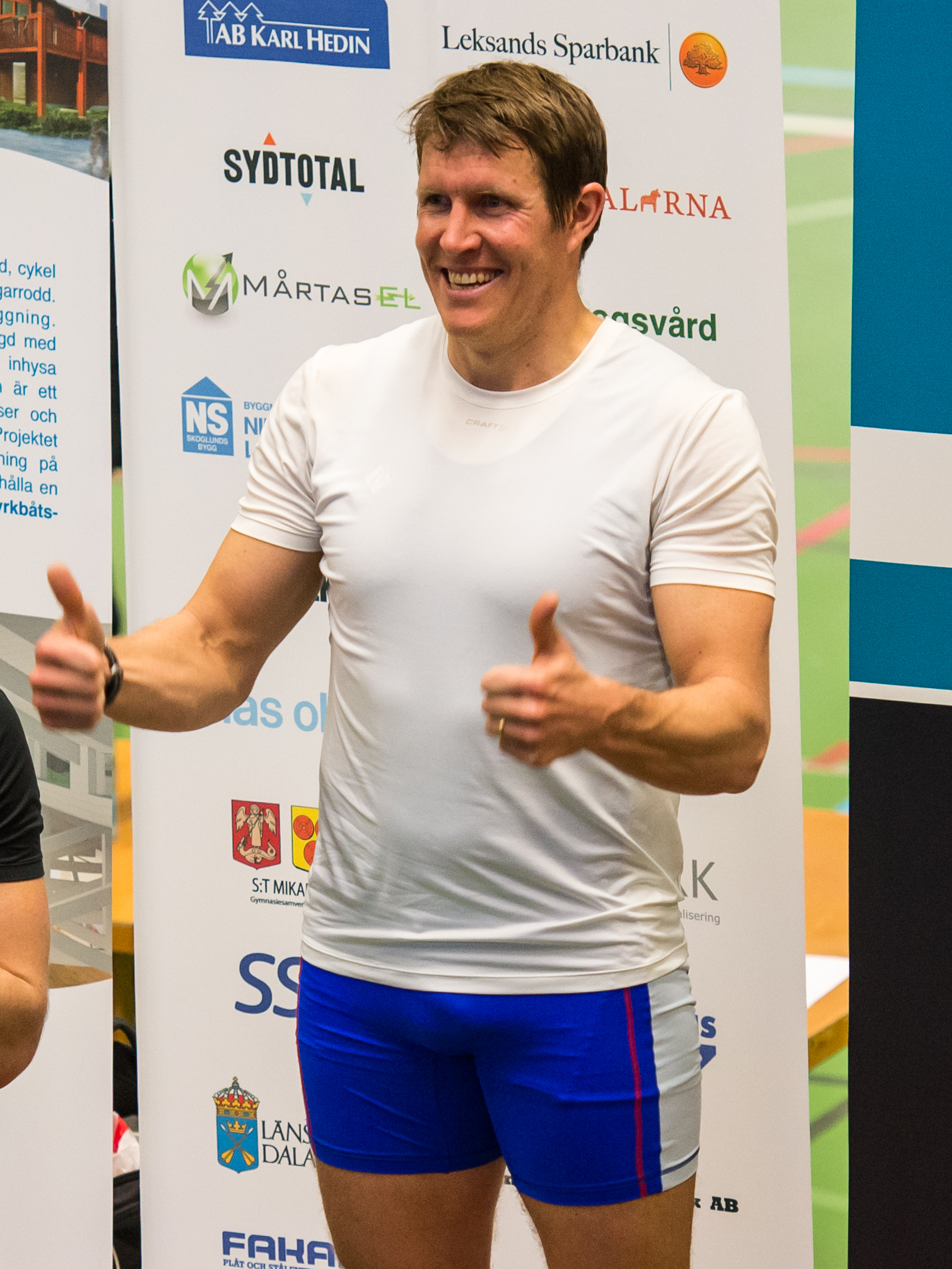
Karonen after winning the 2,000 m Swedish Championships in 2013

Lassi Karonen (born 17 March 1976 in Djura) is a Swedish rower. He finished 6th in the men's single sculls at the 2008 Summer Olympics. In 2012 Summer Olympics he finished 4th, also in men's single sculls.
