= Craig Jones (rower) =

Australian rower (born 1972)

Craig Jones (born 9 April 1972, in Queanbeyan) is an Australian rower who participated in the 2004 Summer Olympic Games in Athens, Greece. He placed eleventh in the men's single sculls event.

Jones placed third in the men's double sculls (M2x) in the 2006 World Rowing Championships.
