= Rodrigo Ideus =

Colombian rower

Rodrigo Ideus Forero
Personal information
- Nationality: Colombian
- Born: 7 March 1987 (age 38); Reading, England

Sport
- Sport: Rowing; Cross-country skiing

Rodrigo Ideus Forero (born 7 March 1987) is a Colombian rower and cross-country skier. He competed in the men's single sculls event at the 2008 Summer Olympics.
