= Peter Hardcastle (rower) =

Australian rower

Personal information
- Nationality: Australian
- Born: 14 July 1978 (age 47) Rochford, UK

Sport
- Club: Nepean Rowing Club; Mosman Rowing Club
Medal record
Men's rowing
Representing Australia
World Rowing Championships
Bronze medal – third place	1999 St. Catharines, CAN	M4X
World Rowing U23 Championships
Gold medal – first place	1998 Ioannina, GRE	BM4X

Peter Hardcastle (born 14 July 1978) is a British-born, Australian rower who competed at the Summer Olympic Games in 2000, 2004, and 2008.

== Club and state rowing ==
His senior rowing was with the Mosman Rowing Club in Sydney.

State representation came for Hardcastle in 2002 when he was selected as the New South Wales single sculler to contest the President's Cup at the Interstate Regatta within the Australian Rowing Championships. He raced further President's Cups for New South Wales in 2003, 2004, 2006, 2007.

On seven occasions between 2001 and 2008 in Mosman's red and white he contested the men's open single sculls title at the Australian Rowing Championships.

== International representative rowing ==
Hardcastle's national representative debut came in 1997 when he was selected in the Australian U23 quad scull to compete at the World Rowing U23 Championships in Milan. They placed fifth.

In 1998 aged nineteen he was elevated to the Australian senior squad and into the quad scull. They raced at the World Rowing Cup III in Lucerne and then at the 1998 World Rowing Championships in Cologne to a fifth place. With Matthew O'Callaghan changed out for Shaun Colton, Stuart Reside, Peter Hardcastle and Martin Inglis also raced as a quad at the 1998 World Rowing U23 Championships in Ioannina, Greece where they won the final and an U23 World Championship title.

Jason Day and Duncan Free stepped into the Australian quad with Reside and Hardcastle in 1999 and they commenced their Olympic campaign for Sydney 2000. They raced at a World Rowing Cup in 1999 and then at the 1999 World Rowing Championships in St Catharines they battled through the preliminaries placing third in their heat, winning their repechage, coming third in their semi-final (facing the ultimate gold and silver medalists Germany and Ukraine) and then repeating the semi-final result with a third place and bronze medal in the final. In the 2000 Olympic year they raced at two World Rowing Cups before coming to the Sydney 2000 where they made the final and finished in fourth place.

After a break, Hardcastle was selected in 2002 in the Australian double scull with Craig Jones. They raced at a World Rowing Cup and then at the 2002 World Rowing Championships in Seville where they won their heat and semi-final and expected to medal in the final but finished in fourth place. In 2003 Hardcastle was teamed with David Crawshay who was in his third year in the Australian senior squad. They rowed the double scull at the World Rowing Cup III in Lucerne to a second place and then at the 2003 World Rowing Championships in Milan to a sixth-place finish in the final.

Crawshay moved into the quad for the 2004 Athens Olympics and Hardcastle found himself with a new double sculls partner in Brendan Long and a somewhat short preparation. They competed at the World Rowing Cup III and in Athens they finished in overall twelfth place. In 2006 he moved back into the Australian quad. They raced at World Rowing Cups I and II and later at the 2006 World Rowing Championships in Eton Dorney the quad failed to make the A final and finished in overall ninth place. In 2007 Hardcastle was Australia's single sculls representative at the 2007 World Rowing Championships in Munich where he finished with an eleventh ranking.

Hardcastle's final Australian representative appearances came in the 2008 Olympic year. He rowed in the quad in Olympic preparation at two World Rowing Cups but was beaten out by South Australia's Chris Morgan for an Olympic seat in the quad. At the Beijing Olympics Hardcastle competed as Australia's single sculls entrant and finished in twelfth place.

== Coaching career ==
Post competitive rowing Hardcastle took up coaching in the United Kingdom. He coached at London's Emanuel School seeing their crews contest the Henley Royal Regatta. In 2014 he was appointed as Chief Coach of the London Rowing Club, a post he held until 2017. In 2017 he was appointed as Senior Rowing Coach at the Imperial College Boat Club.
