= Mohamed Aich =

Algerian rower

Personal information
- Nationality: Algerian
- Born: 30 July 1981 (age 43); Oran, Algeria

Sport
- Sport: Rowing

Mohamed Al Aich (born 30 July 1981) is an Algerian rower. He competed in the men's single sculls event at the 2004 Summer Olympics.
