= Kenneth Jurkowski =

American rower (born 1981)

Personal information
- Born: September 2, 1981 (age 45) Rhinebeck, New York, United States

Sport
- Sport: Rowing
Medal record
Men's rowing
Representing United States
World Rowing Championships
Bronze medal – third place	2006 Eton	M8+
Gold Cup Challenge
Silver medal – second place	2011 Philadelphia	Single sculls

Kenneth "Ken" Jurkowski (born September 2, 1981) is an American rower. He finished 11th in the men's single sculls at the 2008 Summer Olympics.
