= Chaouki Dries =

Algerian rower

Personal information
- Nationality: Algerian
- Born: 16 January 1981 (age 44); Annaba, Algeria

Sport
- Sport: Rowing

Chaouki Dries (born 16 January 1981) is an Algerian rower. He competed in the men's single sculls event at the 2008 Summer Olympics.
