= Tim Maeyens =

Belgian rower (born 1981)

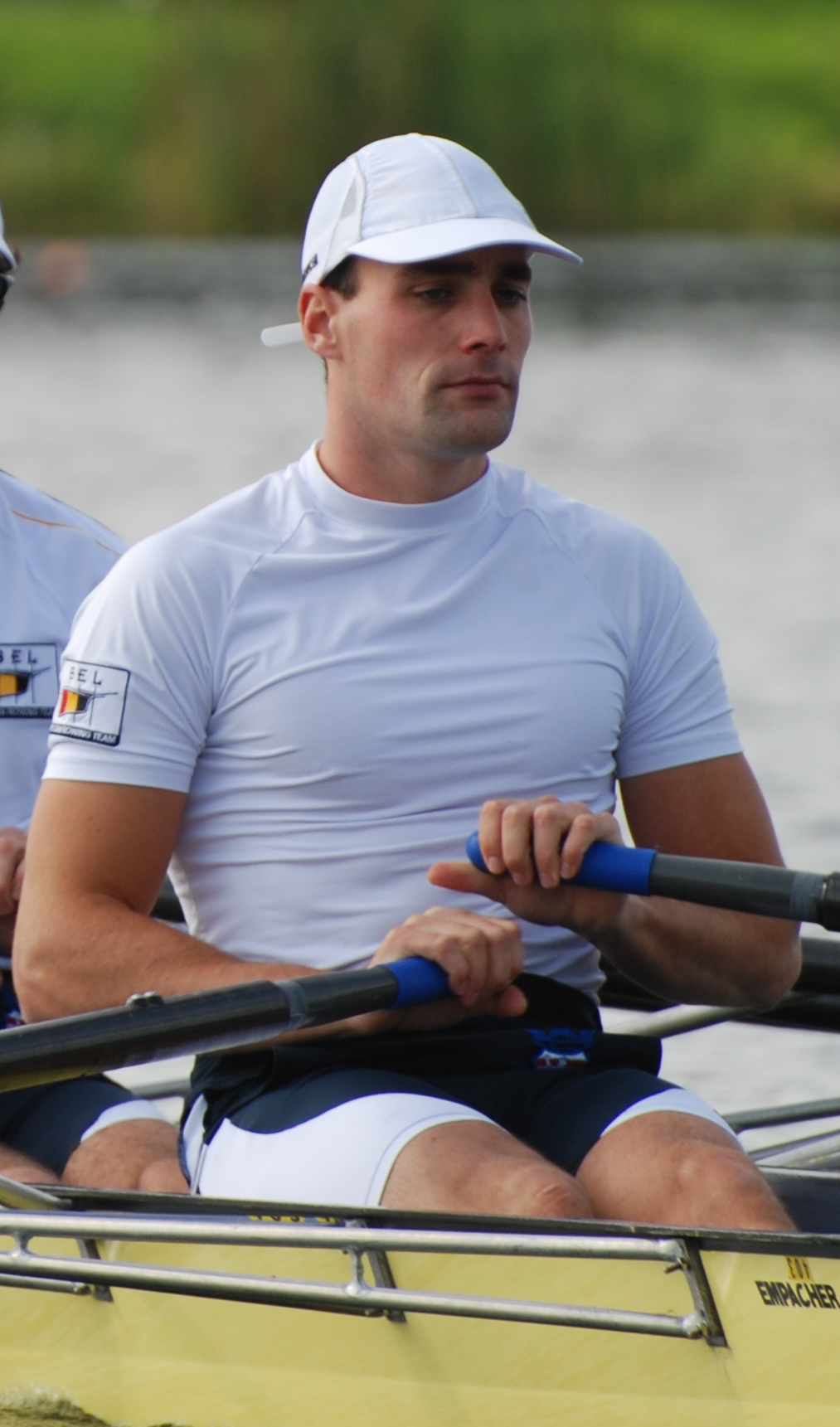

Personal information
- Nationality: Belgian
- Born: 23 August 1981 (age 44); Bruges, Belgium
- Height: 185 cm (6 ft 1 in)
- Weight: 85 kg (187 lb)

Sport
- Country: Belgium
- Sport: Rowing
- Event: Men's single sculls
- Club: Koninklijke Roeivereniging Brugge

Achievements and titles
- Olympic finals: 2004, M1x, 6th; 2008, M1x, 4th
- World finals: 2005, M1x, 4th; 2006, M1x, 5th; 2007, M1x, 7th; 2009, M1x, 4th

Tim Maeyens (born in Bruges, 23 August 1981) is a Belgian rower who competes primarily in the single scull. He competed at three Olympic Games.

He started rowing at the age of nine and rows for the Royal Rowing Association of Bruges.

In 1999, Maeyens won the bronze medal in the single scull at the Junior World Rowing Championships.

In 2002, he teamed up with Christophe Raes to finish sixth place in the double scull at the World Rowing Under 23 Championships.

In 2004, he made the finals on the Olympic Games in Athens and earned sixth place. Maeyens again made the final in the 2008 Olympics, this time finishing fourth, 1.8 seconds out of a medal.

Tim Maeyens graduated in bio-engineering at University of Ghent.
