= Olaf Tufte =

Norwegian rower (1976–2026)

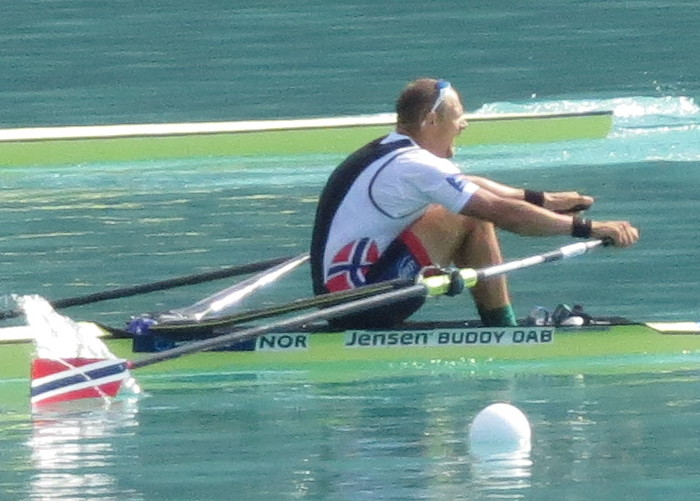
- Tufte in 2015

Personal information
- Nationality: Norwegian
- Born: 27 April 1976 Tønsberg, Norway
- Died: 21 July 2026 (aged 50) Oslo, Norway
- Height: 1.93 m (6 ft 4 in)
- Weight: 95 kg (209 lb)

Sport
- Country: Norway
- Sport: Rowing
- Event: Single sculls
- Club: Horten RK
Medal record
Men's rowing
Representing Norway
Olympic Games
Gold medal – first place	2004 Athens	Single sculls
Gold medal – first place	2008 Beijing	Single sculls
Silver medal – second place	2000 Sydney	Double sculls
Bronze medal – third place	2016 Rio de Janeiro	Double sculls
World Rowing Championships
Gold medal – first place	2001 Lucerne	Single sculls
Gold medal – first place	2003 Milan	Single sculls
Silver medal – second place	2005 Gifu	Single sculls
Bronze medal – third place	1999 St. Catharines	Double sculls
Bronze medal – third place	2002 Seville	Single sculls
Bronze medal – third place	2007 Munich	Single sculls
European Championships
Bronze medal – third place	2015 Poznan	Single sculls

Olaf Karl Tufte (27 April 1976 – 21 July 2026) was a Norwegian rower, firefighter and farmer. He was a seven-time Olympian, and as a single sculler he was twice the Olympic champion and twice the world champion. He was consistently selected to the Norwegian men's senior national rowing squad since 1996, including his selection as a 2020 Tokyo Olympian – where he made his seventh Olympic appearance, racing in the men's quadruple sculls.

== Early rowing career ==
Tufte started rowing at age 17, initially as a means to improve his handle on motocross. He rowed from the Horten Roklubb in Horten, Vestfold on the Oslofjord. He quickly displayed an aptitude for the sport and one year later, in 1994, he debuted internationally for Norway, rowing a single scull at the 1994 Junior World Rowing Championships. He finished sixth. In 1995, he raced in a Norwegian U23 quad scull which took silver at the Nations Cup in Holland.

== Representative rowing career ==
Tufte's senior debut for Norway came at the Atlanta Olympics in 1996. He rowed in the men's coxless four which finished in overall eighth place. He moved back into sculling boats in 1997 and rowed in the Norwegian quad at the 1997 World Rowing Championships in Aiguebelette for an overall thirteenth finish. He secured a seat in men's coxless four in 1998, rowing at two World Rowing Cups and then at the 1998 World Rowing Championships where they made the A final and placed sixth.

In 1999, Tufte moved into a double scull with Fredrik Bekken and commenced their 2000 Olympics campaign. They won gold at all three World Rowing Cups in the European international season of 1999 and then took the bronze medal at the 1999 World Championships in St. Catharines, Canada. They preserved their elite ranking all through 2000 and won the silver medal in the men's double scull at the 2000 Sydney Olympics.

Tufte rowed on without a break after Sydney 2000, taking to a single scull. He finished on the podium at all four World Rowing Cups of 2001 and then won his first world championship title with a gold medal row at the 2001 World Rowing Championships in Lucerne. His performance that year saw him named as the 2001 Norwegian Sportsperson of the Year. Tufte then won silver medals at three World Rowing Cups of 2002 and brought home a bronze medal from the 2002 World Rowing Championships in Spain. In 2003 he timed his build-up to win gold and his second world champion title at the World Championships in Milan.

In 2004, Tufte planned his Olympic build-up perfectly. He was fourth at the World Rowing Cup I, second at WRC II, then won gold at WRC III in the June before heading to the 2004 Athens Olympics, where in the men's single scull he beat the Estonian Jueri Jaanson to win his first Olympic gold medal. He carried on relentlessly into 2005 racing at three World Rowing Cups before finishing in second place at the 2005 World Championships in Gifu, Japan for a silver medal behind New Zealand's Mahe Drysdale who was at that point commencing his own world-class dominant run.

Subsequently in 2006 and 2007, Tufte participated in the 2006 and 2007 World Championships, where he finished fourth and third respectively with Drysdale now the world champion top man. For the 2008 Summer Olympics in Beijing, Tufte was defending his title as Olympic champion. He won his heat and his quarter-final, finished second in his semi but brought it home in the final beating out Ondrej Synek of the Czech Republic and relegating Drysdale to a bronze position. Tufte was now a dual Olympic champion. Between Athens and Beijing, Tufte's performance had not yielded gold in world championships, but he was viewed as an athlete who rose to the big occasion and he was awarded with the title "number one male rower of 2009" in the 2010 FOCUS issue of FISA's World Rowing Magazine.

He placed fourth at the 2010 World Championships in New Zealand and sixth in 2011 in Slovenia. By the time of the 2012 London Olympics Tuft's star and form was waning. He was unsuccessful in defending his Olympic title missing the A final and finishing with an overall ninth ranking. After the 2012 Olympics, Tufte took a year off to treat and recover from a liver disease which had been affecting his form for some years. He returned to the elite level in the single scull but found himself outside the top placings in the 2014 international season. He lifted in 2015 and for the first time in seven years returned to the podium of a major championship, winning bronze at the 2015 European Championships in the single. At that year's World Championships Tufte managed a fourth place behind his old rivals Synek, Drysdale, and the Lithuanian Mindaugas Griskonis.

Tufte's career was reborn in 2016 when he paired up with his Horten Roklubb clubmate, the world champion Kjetil Borch in a double scull. They lifted their ranking throughout 2016, qualified for the Rio Olympics at the final European qualification regatta and ultimately won a bronze medal in the men's double sculls in Rio de Janeiro, Brazil. They rowed on together in 2017 and placed fifth at the 2017 World Rowing Championships.

In 2018, Tufte moved back into the quad scull where his career had started. He secured a seat as stroke of the Norwegian quad and they rowed at World Rowing Cups and European Championships through 2018 and 2019. Their seventh-place ranking at the 2019 World Rowing Championships saw them qualify that boat for Tokyo 2020. By the time of the 2021 crew selections for those delayed Olympics, Tufte had held his seat, and he made his seventh Olympic appearance that year.

== Death ==
On 20 July 2026, Tufte was found unconscious at his farm. He was flown to Rikshospitalet for first-aid operations. According to Dagbladet, no witnesses were present while he was unconscious. He was officially declared dead the following day, on 21 July, according to family members. He was 50 years old.

== Footnotes ==
Awards
Preceded by Trine Hattestad	Norwegian Sportsperson of the Year; 2001	Succeeded by Ole Einar Bjørndalen
