= Ham Jung-wook =

South Korean rower (born 1985)

Personal information
- Nationality: South Korean
- Born: 17 May 1985 (age 40)

Sport
- Sport: Rowing

Ham Jung-wook (born 17 May 1985) is a South Korean rower. He competed in the men's single sculls event at the 2004 Summer Olympics.
