= Gustavo Salcedo (rower) =

Peruvian rower

Personal information
- Born: 21 January 1982 (age 43) Callao, Peru

Sport
- Sport: Rowing

Gustavo Salcedo (born 21 January 1982) is a Peruvian rower. He competed in the men's single sculls event at the 2004 Summer Olympics.
