= Cui Yonghui =

Chinese politician

- 崔永辉

Communist Party Secretary of Xiamen
- In office 30 October 2021 – 3 April 2026
- Deputy: Huang Wenhui (mayor)
- Preceded by: Zhao Long
- Succeeded by: Lin Tao

Personal details
- Born: November 1970 (age 55) Enshi, Hubei, China
- Party: Chinese Communist Party
- Education: Central China Normal University

Chinese name
- Simplified Chinese: 崔永辉
- Traditional Chinese: 崔永輝
Transcriptions
Standard Mandarin
- Hanyu Pinyin: Cuī Yǒnghuī

Cui Yonghui (Chinese: 崔永辉; born November 1970) is a Chinese politician who served as Communist Party Secretary of Xiamen from 2021 to 2026. Previously, he served as vice governor of Fujian and secretary-general of the CCP Fujian Provincial Committee.

== Biography ==
Cui was born in Enshi, Hubei. He studied political education at Central China Normal University and graduated in 1991.

Cui started his career at the Enshi Prefectural Committee of the Chinese People's Political Consultative Conference. He taught at Shiyan Vocational and Technical College and served at various administrative positions at the college. In 2000, he was appointed deputy governor of Maojian District, Shiyan, Hubei. In 2002, he was transferred to Danjiangkou, a county-level city in Hubei, and served as head of the organization department and specifically-designated deputy party secretary of the CCP county committee. He was appointed mayor of Danjiangkou in 2006.

In 2009, Cui was appointed deputy director of the Hubei Provincial Audit Department. In 2011, he was transferred to Huanggang to serve as vice mayor. In 2016, he was transferred to Jingzhou to serve as its specifically-designated deputy party secretary and secretary of the political and legal affairs commission of the CCP prefectural committee. He was appointed mayor of Jingzhou in 2017.

In 2020, Cui was transferred from his native Hubei to Fujian to serve as vice governor of the province. He was appointed a member of the standing committee of the CCP Fujian Provincial Committee to serve as the secretary-general of the committee in June 2021. In October 2021, he was appointed Communist Party Secretary of Xiamen. He stepped down as party secretary of Xiamen on 3 April 2026.

Government offices
Preceded by Guo Xinming	Mayor of Danjiangkou; 2006–2009	Succeeded by Zeng Wenhua
Preceded by Yang Zhi [zh]	Mayor of Jingzhou; 2017–2020	Succeeded by Zhou Zhihong
Party political offices
Preceded by Zheng Xincong	Secretary-General of the CCP Fujian Provincial Committee; 2021	Succeeded by Wu Xielin
Preceded by Zhao Long	Communist Party Secretary of Xiamen; 2021–2026	Incumbent
