= André Vonarburg =

Swiss rower

André Vonarburg (born 16 January 1978, in Lucerne) is a Swiss rower. He has represented Switzerland at four Olympics. He finished 5th in the men's quadruple sculls at the 2000 Summer Olympics (with Christian Stofer, Michael Erdlen and Simon Stürm). At the 2004 Summer Olympics, he was part of a team that did not reach the medal final. The same thing happened at the 2008 Summer Olympics and the 2012 Summer Olympics.
