= Wang Ming-hui =

Taiwanese rower (born 1985)

Wang Ming-hui 汪明輝
Personal information
- Nationality: Taiwanese
- Born: 24 October 1985 (age 39); Hualien, Taiwan

Sport
- Sport: Rowing

Wang Ming-hui (Chinese: 汪明輝; born 24 October 1985) is a Taiwanese rower. He competed at the 2004 Summer Olympics, 2008 Summer Olympics and the 2012 Summer Olympics.
