= Su Hui (rower) =

Chinese rower

Personal information
- Nationality: Chinese
- Born: March 23, 1982 (age 43); Xi'an, Shaanxi, China

Sport
- Sport: Rowing

Su Hui (born 23 March 1982 in Xi'an, Shaanxi) is a male Chinese rower, who competed for Team China at the 2004 Summer Olympics.

== Major performances ==
- 2001 National Games – 1st quadruple sculls;
- 2002/2006 Asian Games – 1st/3rd double sculls;
- 2003/2004/2006 National Championships – 1st quadruple/single/single sculls;
- 2005 National Games – 2nd single/quadruple sculls;
- 2008 World Cup Lucerne – 4th M2X
