= Buschmann =

Buschmann is German-language surname. Notable people with the name include:

- Anet-Jacqueline Buschmann (born 1982), Bulgarian rower
- Christian Friedrich Ludwig Buschmann (1805–1864), German musical instrument maker
- Johann Karl Eduard Buschmann (1805–1880), German philologist
- Matt Buschmann (born 1984), American baseball player and coach
- Marco Buschmann (born 1977), German politician
- Martin Buschmann (born 1970), German politician

== See also ==
- Bushman (disambiguation)
