= Kizh =

Indigenous people of Southern California, U.S.

The Kizh or Kit’c (/kiːtʃ/ KEETCH) are an Indigenous people of California, the historically and ethnographically documented lineal descendants of the Mission Indians of San Gabriel. They belong to a group commonly known by the Spanish name Gabrieleño.

The name Kizh is a shortened version of the first name used to represent all of the Gabrieleño-speaking People of the Los Angeles Basin, Kichereno, which "is not a place name, but a tribe name, the name of a kind of people." (Harrington 1986: R129 F345; cited in McCawley 1996, 43).

The name Kizh is derived from a reference by a Canadian ethnologist to one of the numerous villages in the Los Angeles Basin from records at Mission Viejas, Kizheriños (The People of the Willow Houses). Hugo Reid documented at least 28 Gabrielino villages.

== Language ==
The Kizh language is a Takic language, part of the Uto-Aztecan language family. In 1811, the priests of Mission San Gabriel recorded the Gabrieleño language and at least three dialects, including Fernadeño, Nicoleño, and Cataleño. These early language maps can be used to best define the precontact tribal boundaries.

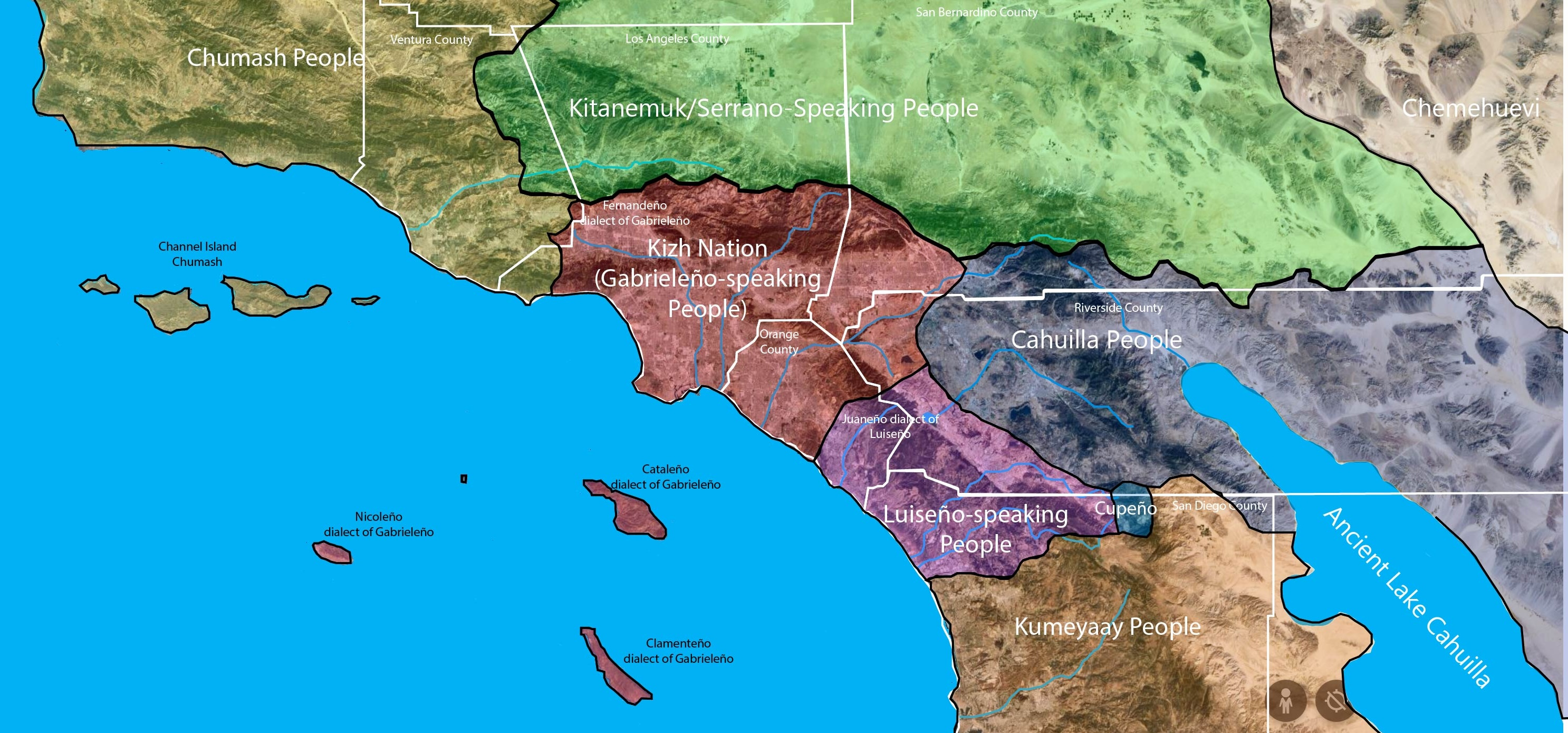

== Settlements ==
In January 1982, the U.S. Corps of Engineers issued a report describing and identifying numerous Gabrieleño villages.

== Contemporary groups ==
Today, the Kizh Nation have their tribal offices and museum in Covina, California.

The Kizh Nation's homeland consists of Los Angeles County, Orange County, and parts of San Bernardino and Riverside Counties, and includes about 500 members.

== Name ==
During colonization, the people were referred to as Gabrieleño, (Note: Alternative forms include Gabrieliño and Fernardiño.) a name derived from Mission San Gabriel Arcángel, a Spanish mission built on their land. (Note: The Spanish did not always differentiate between communities or ethnic groups. For example, the Spanish referred to both the Tongva in the San Fernando Valley and the nearby Tataviam people, who spoke a different language, as "Fernandeño," because they were covered by that mission.) The name Tongva has been criticized by the Kizh Nation, who see it as coming into existence in 1905 from the accounts of one ethnographer, C. Hart Merriam. They claim that the name Kizh has origins in the earliest records of contact as a name the people used to refer to the willow branch, tule, and brush houses they lived in, and was used widely by various ethnographers in the 19th and early 20th century. Due to strategic branding, Tongva remains the most widely used name, gaining popularity in the late 20th century.

The word Tongva was coined by C. Hart Merriam in 1905, sourced from a Gabrieleño woman, Mrs. James Rosemyre (née Narcisa Higuera), who lived around Fort Tejon, near Bakersfield. According to Ernie Salas, Merriam asked how to pronounce the name of a village, and misinterpreted her response, Toviscangna, as a tribal identifier. Unable to understand or pronounce the word Toviscangna, he abbreviated it as "tonve" or "tonvey" in his field notes; by his orthography, it would be pronounced /ˈtɒŋveɪ/, TONG-vay. Since tribal members referred to themselves primarily by their village name rather than a "national" or "pan-tribal" name, it is argued that Rosemyre was referring to her village name, not an overarching tribal name. From the perspective of the Kizh, Tongva was falsely promoted in the 1980s and 1990s until the point that it reached favorability. According to Merriam, the term Kij (or Kizh) was a "term invented by [Robert Gordon] Latham for Indians of San Gabriel (based on numerals published by De Mofras)."

As stated by Kizh Nation (Gabrieleño Band of Mission Indians) tribal spokesperson Ernest Perez Teutimez Salas, Tongva gained notoriety in 1992 when the tribe was approached by non-Native people who expressed that in order to save a sacred spring in Santa Monica from a major development project and receive federal recognition that the tribe needed to use the name "Tongva." Although Salas had reservations about doing so and had never heard the term before, the tribe hesitantly supported the decision in order to save the spring, which was saved under the “Gabrieleño/Tongva Springs Foundation.” About a year later, contact with these individuals was cut off. As stated by Nadine Salas, "we used to have get-togethers, and then it was like they got what they wanted; they didn’t want anything to do with us anymore.” Kizh Nation biologist Matt Teutimez stated, "When you just throw it out into the universe, and it sticks, you go with it, and that’s what happened with the Tongva."

E. Gary Stickel observes that ethnologist John Peabody Harrington, who conducted extensive ethnographic work among the Southern California tribes, wrote in his notes (presently housed at the Smithsonian Institution archives) that the word tongva refers to where the Gabrieleño people ground their seeds on rocks, and that the noun must be accompanied by a positional prefix. Stickel writes that the term tongva has been used mistakenly to refer to the tribe "when, according to Harrington, it refers to what archaeologists call a 'bedrock mortar', which is a rock outcrop with depressions in it created by Indians pounding pestles into them to process acorns and other plant products."

=== Kizh ===
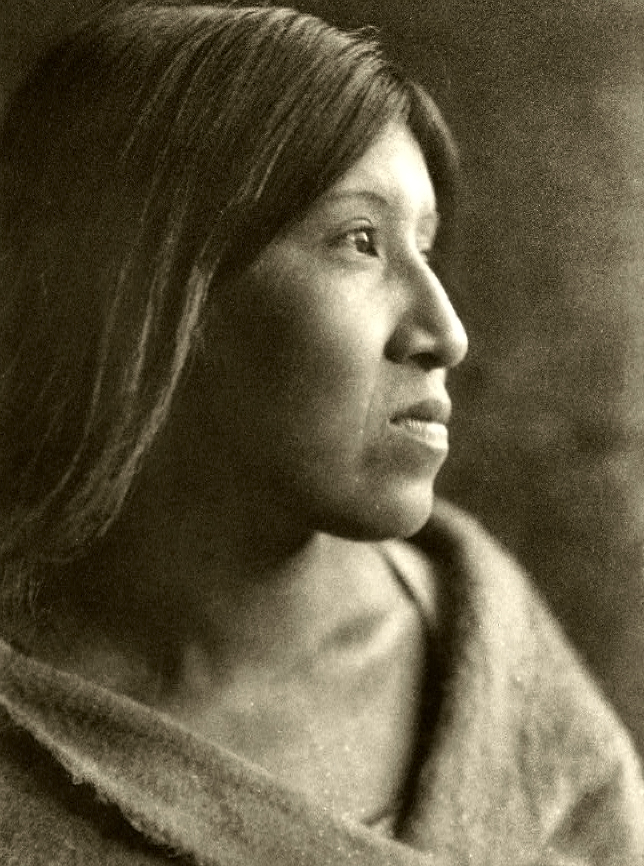
"Desert Cahuilla woman" by Edward S. Curtis (1926). The neighboring ʔívil̃uqaletem (Cahuilla) referred to the Kizh as Kisianos which has been cited as a potential source of Kizh.

According to Andrew Salas, the name Kizh (pronounced Keech), sometimes spelled Kij, comes from the first construction of Mission San Gabriel in 1771. The people of the surrounding villages who were used as slave laborers to construct the mission referred to themselves as "Kizh" and the Spanish hispanicized the term as "Kichireños", as noted by ethnographer J.P. Harrington's consultant Raimundo Yorba. The word Kizh referred to the houses they lived in, "most of which were dome-shaped and made with a framework of willow branches and roofed over with thatching." The neighboring ʔívil̃uqaletem (Cahuilla) referred to the people as Kisianos or "people of the willow-brush houses," which has been cited as a potential source for the term Kizh. Following the destruction of the original mission, the Spanish relocated the mission five miles north and began to refer to the Kizh as "Gabrieleño."

...Kizh for the Indians living near San Gabriel (i.e. Whittier Narrows area)... According to Harrington's (ethnographer J.P. Harrington) consultant Raimundo Yorba, the Gabrielino in the Whittier Narrows area referred to themselves as Kichireno, one of a bunch of people that lived at that place of San Gabriel which is known as Mission Vieja. Kichereno is not a place name, but a tribe name, the name of a kind of people.

In 1846, a Canadian scholar Horatio Hale used the term Kizh in a United States government report on “Ethnography and Philology.” Lieutenant Amiel Weeks Whipple, Thomas Ewbank, and William Turner used Kizh when publishing a “Report upon the Indian Tribes” in 1855 for the U.S. War Department. German scholar Johann Carl Eduard Buschmann used the term in a study on language in 1856 published in the German Royal Academy of Science. Further notable scholars who used Kizh throughout the 19th and early 20th centuries include George Bell (in 1856), Robert Gordon Latham (in 1860), Lewis H. Morgan (in 1868), Albert Samuel Gatschet (in 1877), Hubert Howe Bancroft (in 1883), Daniel G. Briton (in 1891), David Prescott Barrows (in 1900), and A. L. Kroeber (in 1907).

In 1875, H. C. Yarrow stated that the name Kizh could not be verified at Mission San Gabriel, though later reports contradict his statement. He reported that the natives called themselves Tobikhar meaning Settlers and spoke the Spanish language more than their own. In 1885, Hoffman also referred to the natives as Tobikhar. In 1900, David Prescott Barrows used the term Kizh and stated that use of the term Tobikhar was incorrect: "Mr. Gatschet is in error when he speaks of the Serrano and San Gabriel Indians calling themselves Takhtam and Tobikhar, respectively. The words are unknown as tribal designations among these Indians themselves, and precisely this point constitutes the objections to them.” This may be because of multilingualism at the mission; in 1811, the priests of Mission San Gabriel recorded 7 languages, due to the fact they deliberately imported workers from distant villages in an effort to minimize the organization of residence.

The Kizh Nation has never denied the indigeneity of some that claim to be Tongva, but do deny they are lineal descendants of the Los Angeles Basin. Mission records show that along with the original inhabitants of the LA Basin (Kizh people), Luiseño-speaking, Nahuatl-speaking and Mayan-speaking people were baptized at Mission San Gabriel and are therefore "Gabrieleño". Therefore, the Kizh Nation considers them native and Gabrieleño, but not Native to the Los Angeles Basin and therefore not Kizh.

=== Gabrieleño ===
The Act of September 21, 1968 introduced this concept of the affiliation of an applicant's ancestors in order to exclude certain individuals from receiving a share of the award to the "Indians of California" who chose to receive a share of any awards to certain tribes in California that had splintered off from the generic group. The members or ancestors of the petitioning group were not affected by the exclusion in the Act. Individuals with lineal or collateral descent from an Indian tribe who resided in California in 1852, would, if not excluded by the provisions of the Act of 1968, remain on the list of the "Indians of California". To comply with the Act, the Secretary of Interior would have to collect information about the group affiliation of an applicant's Indian ancestors. That information would be used to identify applicants who could share in another award. The group affiliation of an applicant's ancestors was thus a basis for exclusion from, but not a requirement for inclusion on, the judgment roll. The act of 1968 stated that the Secretary of the Interior would distribute an equal share of the award to the individuals on the judgment roll, "regardless of group affiliation".

Gabrieleño was the name assigned to the Indigenous peoples surrounding Mission San Gabriel by the Spanish. It was not a name that the people ever used to refer to themselves. However, it remains a part of every official tribe's name, either as "Gabrieleño" or "Gabrielino." Because of the disagreement between tribal groups surrounding usage of the term Tongva, Gabrieleño has been used as a mediating term. For example, when Debra Martin, a city council member from Pomona, led a project to dedicate wooden statues in local Ganesha Park to the Indigenous people of the area in 2017, there was considerable conflict over which name, Tongva or Kizh, would be used on the dedication plaque. A tentative agreement was reached to use the term Gabrieleño, despite its colonial origins.
