= Sonia Mills =

Australian rower (born 1980)

Personal information
- Born: 24 January 1980 (age 46)
- Years active: 2001–08

Sport
- Sport: Rowing
- Club: Canberra Rowing Club
Medal record
Women's rowing
Representing Australia
World Rowing Championships
| Gold medal – first place | 2005 Gifu, Japan | Eight |
| Silver medal – second place | 2006 Eton, England | Quad scull |

Sonia Mills (born 24 January 1980) is an Australian former rower – an Australian national champion, world champion and an Olympian. She had world championship success in both sculls and in sweep-oared boat classes. She competed in the women's double sculls event at the 2008 Summer Olympics.

== Club and state rowing ==
Raised in Maroochydore, Queensland, Mills' first senior rowing was done from the Noosa Rowing Club and later after she took her Australian Institute of Sport (AIS) scholarship, from the Canberra Rowing Club.

Mills' first state representative selection came in 2003 when she was selected for Queensland to race a national single sculls title for the Nell Slater Trophy at the Interstate Regatta within the Australian Rowing Championships. She was offered a scholarship to the AIS in its joint venture with Rowing Australia under the National Rowing Centre of Excellence program. From 2004 Mills was selected in Australian Capital Territory senior women's eight to contest the Queen's Cup at the Australian Championships.

In Canberra Rowing Club colours she contested the open single sculls event at the Australian Rowing Championships in 2005, 2006 and 2008 placing 2nd to Dana Faletic in 2006. She competed for the double sculls national title in 2005 and won that Australian championship in 2006 with Sally Kehoe. In 2007 she contested the national quad sculls Australian championship and was victorious in a composite selection quad in 2007.

== International representative rowing ==
Mills first represented for Australia contesting the 2004 World Rowing Championships in Banyoles, Spain in a coxless four. She placed sixth.

In 2005, she came into contention for a seat in the Australian eight and at the World Rowing Cups I and II she contributed her strength and power from the three seat to help the eight to a fourth and then a first place respectively. She also raced in smaller boats at those regattas and with Kate Hornsey their pair was the slowest of the three pairs contested by members of the eight. A few weeks later at the 2005 World Rowing Championships in Gizu, Japan Mills rowed in the women's eight to a gold medal and a world championship title.

Having won the Australian double sculls championship in 2006, Mills was in contention for Australian representative selection as a sculler. She raced at World Rowing Cups I and II in the Australian women's quad and at the WRC II she also competed in a coxless pair with Catriona Sens and took bronze. She secured her two seat in the Australian quad for the 2006 World Rowing Championships at Eton Dorney who won a silver medal.

The standard of Australian elite women's rowing in 2007 was high and even giving the selectors a wealth of talent from which to choose. Mills was in contention for the eight who match raced for selection in small boats at the World Rowing Cup I in Linz in pairs and at the WRC II in Amsterdam in fours. In Linz the eight also raced with Mills at bow. For the 2007 World Rowing Championships however Mills missed selection in the eight with Sally Kehoe taking the bow seat and Robyn Selby Smith at three. Mills was picked to race the Australian quad scull with Amy Ives, Catriona Sens and Brooke Pratley. They placed fourth in Munich 2007.

Mills' final Australian representative outing was at the 2008 Beijing Olympics. She was picked early in the double scull with Catriona Sens and they raced at World Rowing Cup II as a lead up. In Beijing Mills and Sens finished fourth in their heat, third in a repechage and missed the A final. They finished eighth overall.
