= Rowing at the 2008 Summer Olympics – Women's double sculls =

Women's double sculls at the Games of the XXIX Olympiad

Medalists
1st place, gold medalist(s)		Georgina Evers-Swindell; Caroline Evers-Swindell	New Zealand
2nd place, silver medalist(s)		Annekatrin Thiele; Christiane Huth	Germany
3rd place, bronze medalist(s)		Elise Laverick and Anna Bebington	Great Britain

Women's double sculls competition at the 2008 Summer Olympics in Beijing was held between August 9 and 16 at the Shunyi Olympic Rowing-Canoeing Park.

This rowing event is a double scull event, meaning that each boat is propelled by a pair of rowers. The "scull" portion means that each rower uses two oars, one on each side of the boat; this contrasts with sweep rowing in which each rower has one oar and rows on only one side. The competition consists of multiple rounds. Finals were held to determine the placing of each boat; these finals were given letters with those nearer to the beginning of the alphabet meaning a better ranking.

During the first round two heats were held. The top boat in each heat advanced directly to the A final, with all others going to the repechage. The two repechage heats filled out the rest of the finals, with the best two boats in each repechage heat advancing to the A final and the remaining two boats in each repechage going to the B final.

Each final determined a set of rankings. The A final determined the medals, along with the rest of the places through 6th. The B final gave the rest of the rankings, through 10th place.

In the A Final, Georgina and Caroline Evers-Swindell of New Zealand defended their double sculls gold medal from the 2004 Summer Olympics in a highly competitive race which saw them beat the German crew by just 1/100 of a second (7:07.32 versus 7:07.33), and the third-placing British crew by just 0.23 seconds. This was the first time in Olympic history that the Women's Double Sculls title had been successfully defended.

== Schedule ==
All times are China Standard Time (UTC+8)

Date	Time	Round
Saturday, August 9, 2008	16:40-17:00	Heats
Monday, August 11, 2008	17:00-17:20	Repechages
Friday, August 15, 2008	17:30-17:40	Final B
Saturday, August 16, 2008	16:50-17:00	Final A

== Results ==
=== Heats ===
- Qualification Rules: 1->FA, 2..->R

==== Heat 1 ====
Rank	Rowers	Country	Time	Notes
1	Georgina Evers-Swindell, Caroline Evers-Swindell	New Zealand	7:03.92	FA
2	Annekatrin Thiele, Christiane Huth	Germany	7:09.06	R
3	Megan Kalmoe, Ellen Tomek	United States	7:11.17	R
4	Ionelia Neacsu, Roxana Gabriela Cogianu	Romania	7:12.17	R
5	Kateryna Tarasenko, Yana Dementyeva	Ukraine	7:25.03	R

==== Heat 2 ====
Rank	Rowers	Country	Time	Notes
1	Li Qin, Tian Liang	China	7:03.13	FA
2	Jitka Antošová, Gabriela Vařeková	Czech Republic	7:04.23	R
3	Elise Laverick, Anna Bebington	Great Britain	7:08.65	R
4	Catriona Sens, Sonia Mills	Australia	7:13.25	R
5	Laura Schiavone, Elisabetta Sancassani	Italy	7:30.25	R

=== Repechages ===
- Qualification Rules: 1-2>FA, 3..->FB

==== Repechage 1 ====
Rank	Rowers	Country	Time	Notes
1	Elise Laverick, Anna Bebington	Great Britain	6:54.92	FA
2	Annekatrin Thiele, Christiane Huth	Germany	6:55.96	FA
3	Ionelia Neacsu, Roxana Gabriela Cogianu	Romania	7:01.69	FB
4	Laura Schiavone, Elisabetta Sancassani	Italy	7:08.00	FB

==== Repechage 2 ====
Rank	Rowers	Country	Time	Notes
1	Megan Kalmoe, Ellen Tomek	United States	6:58.84	FA
2	Jitka Antošová, Gabriela Vařeková	Czech Republic	7:00.75	FA
3	Catriona Sens, Sonia Mills	Australia	7:04.30	FB
4	Kateryna Tarasenko, Yana Dementyeva	Ukraine	7:06.77	FB

=== Final B ===
Rank	Rowers	Country	Time	Notes
1	Kateryna Tarasenko, Yana Dementyeva	Ukraine	7:17.82	
2	Catriona Sens, Sonia Mills	Australia	7:19.73	
3	Ionelia Neacsu, Roxana Gabriela Cogianu	Romania	7:20.99	
4	Laura Schiavone, Elisabetta Sancassani	Italy	7:29.22	

=== Final A ===
Rank	Rowers	Country	Time	Notes
Gold medal	Georgina Evers-Swindell, Caroline Evers-Swindell	New Zealand	7:07.32	
Silver medal	Annekatrin Thiele, Christiane Huth	Germany	7:07.33	
Bronze medal	Elise Laverick, Anna Bebington	Great Britain	7:07.55	
4	Li Qin, Tian Liang	China	7:15.85	
5	Megan Kalmoe, Ellen Tomek	United States	7:17.53	
6	Miroslava Knapková, Gabriela Vařeková	Czech Republic	7:25.09	
