= Peggy Waleska =

German rower

Personal information
- Born: 11 April 1980 (age 46) Pirna, Bezirk Dresden, East Germany
- Height: 180 cm (5 ft 11 in)
- Weight: 69 kg (152 lb)

Sport
- Sport: Rowing
- Club: Pirnaer Ruderverein 1872
Medal record
Women's rowing
Representing Germany
Olympic Games
Silver medal – second place	2004 Athens	Double sculls
World Rowing Championships
Gold medal – first place	2001 Lucerne	Women's quad
Gold medal – first place	2002 Seville	Women's quad
Bronze medal – third place	2003 Milan	Quad Sculls
Bronze medal – third place	2009 Poznan	Quad Sculls

Peggy Waleska (born 11 April 1980) is a German rower.

Waleska was born in 1980 in Pirna, a town in Saxony. She is a world champion rower who won a gold medal in the women's quadruple sculls in Lucerne, Switzerland, in 2001 and successfully defended the title in Seville, Spain, in 2002.

At the 2004 Athens Summer Olympics, Waleska won a silver medal in the women's double sculls event.
