= Scottish Huntington's Association =

- Founded: 1989
- Purpose: Care and support for families affected by huntington's disease
- Location: Paisley, with 9 regional offices
- Region served: Scotland
- Key people: Alistair Haw (chief executive); Sarah Winckless (patron)
- Website: www.hdscotland.org

Scottish Huntington's Association, also known as SHA, is a registered charity located in Scotland that supports families impacted by the degenerative brain condition Huntington's disease. Its headquarters is in Paisley.

== History and operation ==
The charity was established in 1989 by families for families living with Huntington's disease and its chief executive is Alistair Haw.

It works with the NHS and other agencies to co-ordinate a national plan for delivery of services to Huntington's patients and their families. It is also a member of the Neurological Alliance of Scotland.

The charity funds nine specialist services across Scotland's regions to assist with access to nursing, welfare and other support. It has been estimated that 16 in every 100,000 people in Scotland are living with the illness and the charity has reported an increase in referrals in recent years. The charity also delivers youth services to young people who may be affected by the disease and works to raise awareness of the condition.

In 2015, SHA and Stirling University received a prize at the Scottish Charity Awards for a joint project to design an accredited course to improve the awareness and knowledge of huntington's disease among health and social care staff in Scotland. Said to be the first of its type, the course is part of the Scottish Qualifications Framework.

The SHA is part of the UK HD Alliance. It is also a member of the International Huntington Alliance. Its patron is Olympic rower Sarah Winckless, who was diagnosed with Huntington's Disease several years ago.

== See also ==
- Huntington's Disease Association (England and Wales)
- Huntington's disease clinical research
