= Laura Schiavone =

Italian rower

Personal information
- Nationality: Italian
- Born: 13 October 1986 (age 39) Naples, Italy
- Height: 1.73 m (5 ft 8 in)
- Weight: 73 kg (161 lb)

Sport
- Sport: Rowing
- Club: Irno C.C.
- Start activity: 1998
- Coached by: Francesco Arvino
Medal record
Event	1st	2nd	3rd
European Championships	1	1	2

Laura Schiavone (born 13 October 1986) is an Italian rower who competed in the women's double sculls event at the 2008 Summer Olympics. She is also a medal winner at senior level at the European Rowing Championships.
