= Šternberk =

- Town
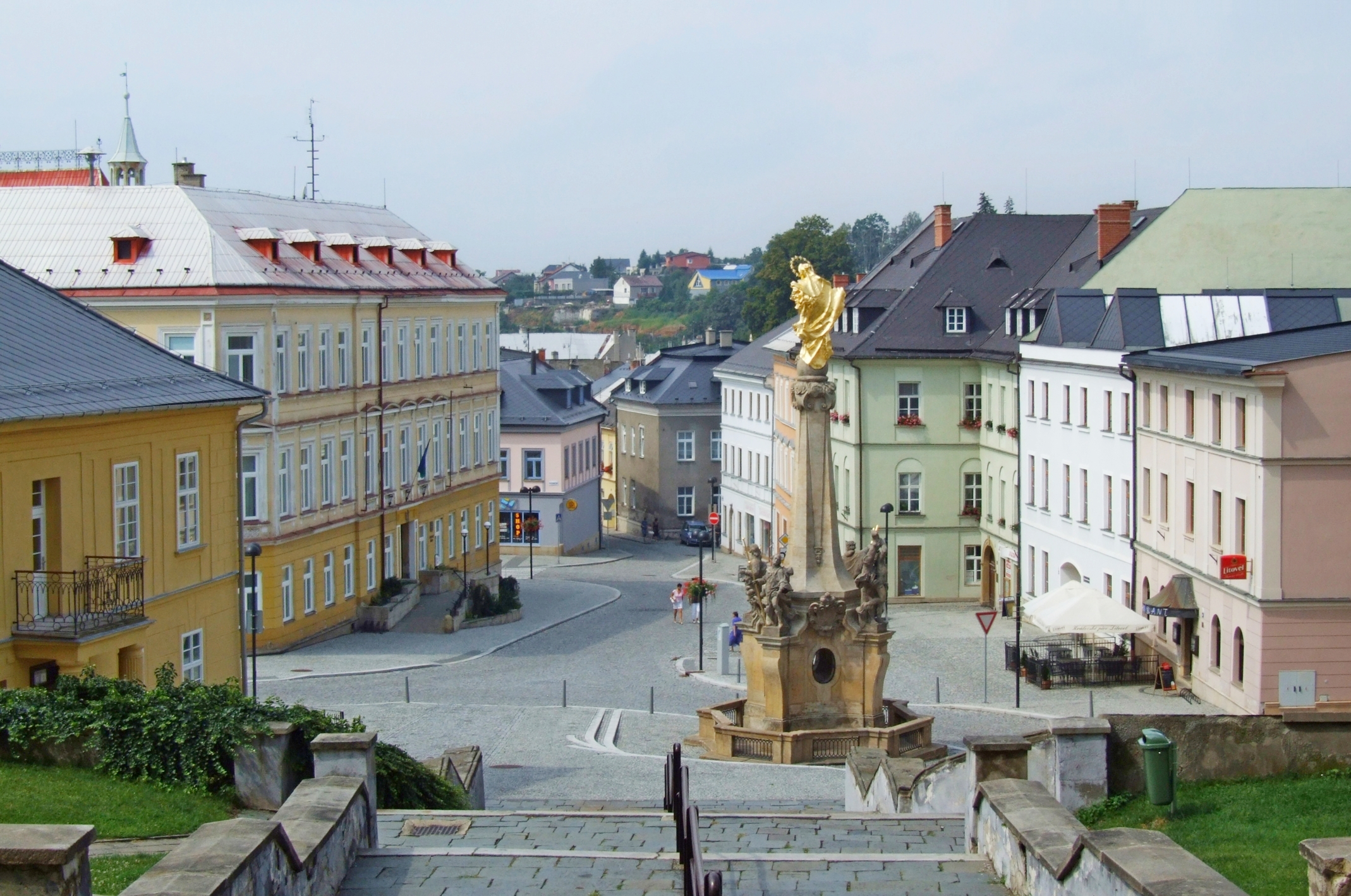
- The square Horní náměstí

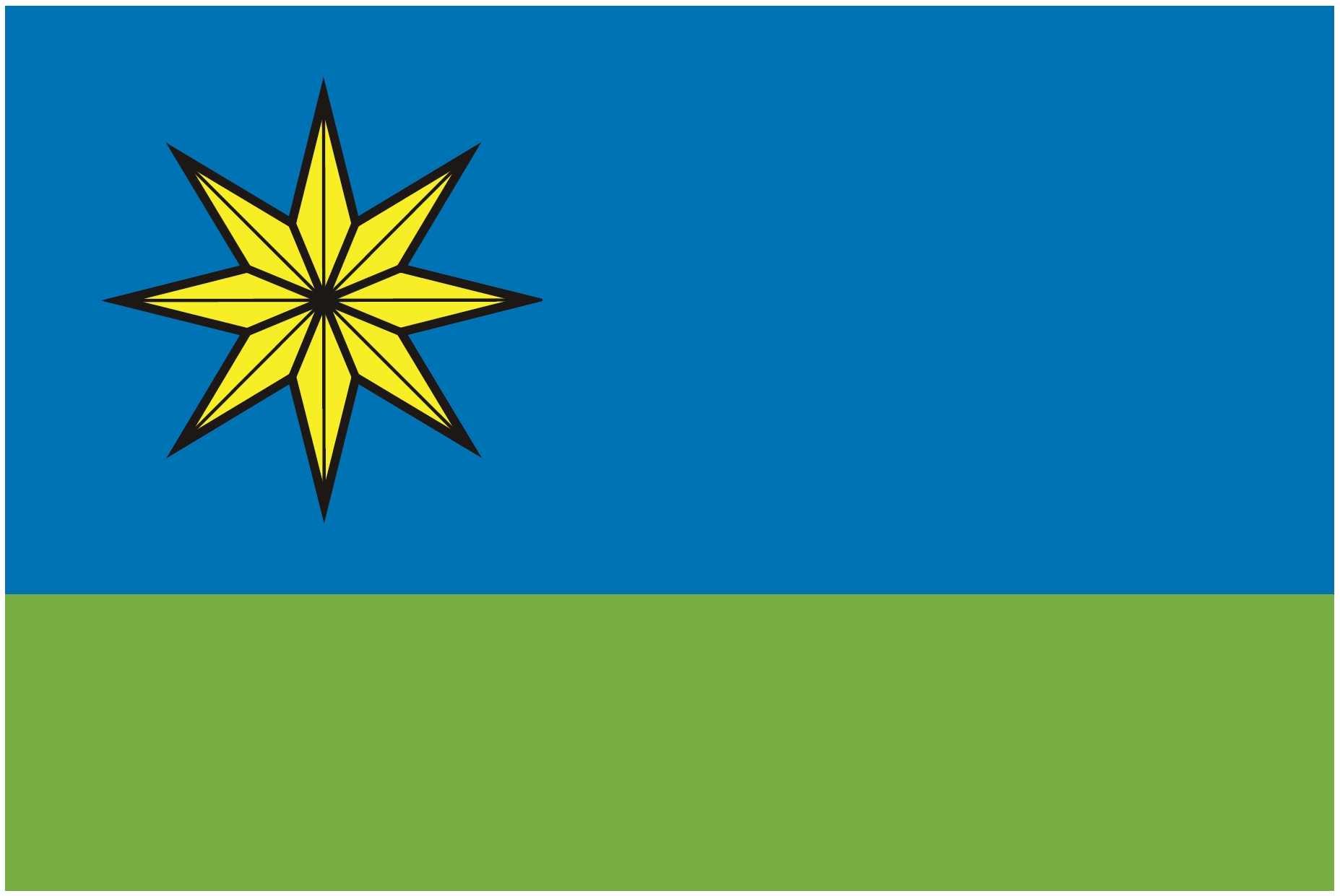
- Flag Coat of arms

- Location in the Czech Republic
- Coordinates: 49°43′50″N 17°17′56″E
- Country: Czech Republic
- Region: Olomouc
- District: Olomouc
- First mentioned: 1269

Government
  - Mayor: Stanislav Orság (ODS)

Area
  - Total: 48.79 km^{2} (18.84 sq mi)
- Elevation: 268 m (879 ft)

Population (2026-01-01)
  - Total: 13,207
  - Density: 270.7/km^{2} (701.1/sq mi)
- Time zone: UTC+1 (CET)
  - Summer (DST): UTC+2 (CEST)
- Postal code: 785 01
- Website: www.sternberk.eu

Šternberk (Czech pronunciation: [ˈʃtɛrnbɛrk]; German: (Mährisch-)Sternberg) is a town in Olomouc District in the Olomouc Region of the Czech Republic. It has about 13,000 inhabitants. The town is located on the Sitka Stream, on the border between the Nízký Jeseník range and Upper Morava Valley.

Šternberk was founded in the 13th century. Among the most notable owners of the town were the Liechtenstein family, who ruled in from 1693. The historic town centre is well preserved and is protected as an urban monument zone. The most important monument is the Šternberk Castle, protected as a national cultural monument.

== Administrative division ==
Šternberk consists of five municipal parts (in brackets population according to the 2021 census):

- Šternberk (12,503)
- Chabičov (144)
- Dalov (166)
- Krakořice (90)
- Těšíkov (104)

Těšíkov forms an exclave of the municipal territory.

== Etymology ==
The town's name is derived from its first owners, the Lords of Šternberk (German: Sternberg), and their coat of arms, which features a mountain (German: Berg') and a golden star (German: Stern).

== Geography ==
Šternberk is located about 15 kilometres (9 mi) north of Olomouc. It lies on the border of two geomorphological regions. Most of the municipal territory belongs to the Nízký Jeseník range, but the eastern part of the town lies in the Upper Morava Valley. The highest point is the hill Vysoká Roudná at 660 m (2,165 ft) above sea level. The Sitka Stream flows through the town.

== History ==
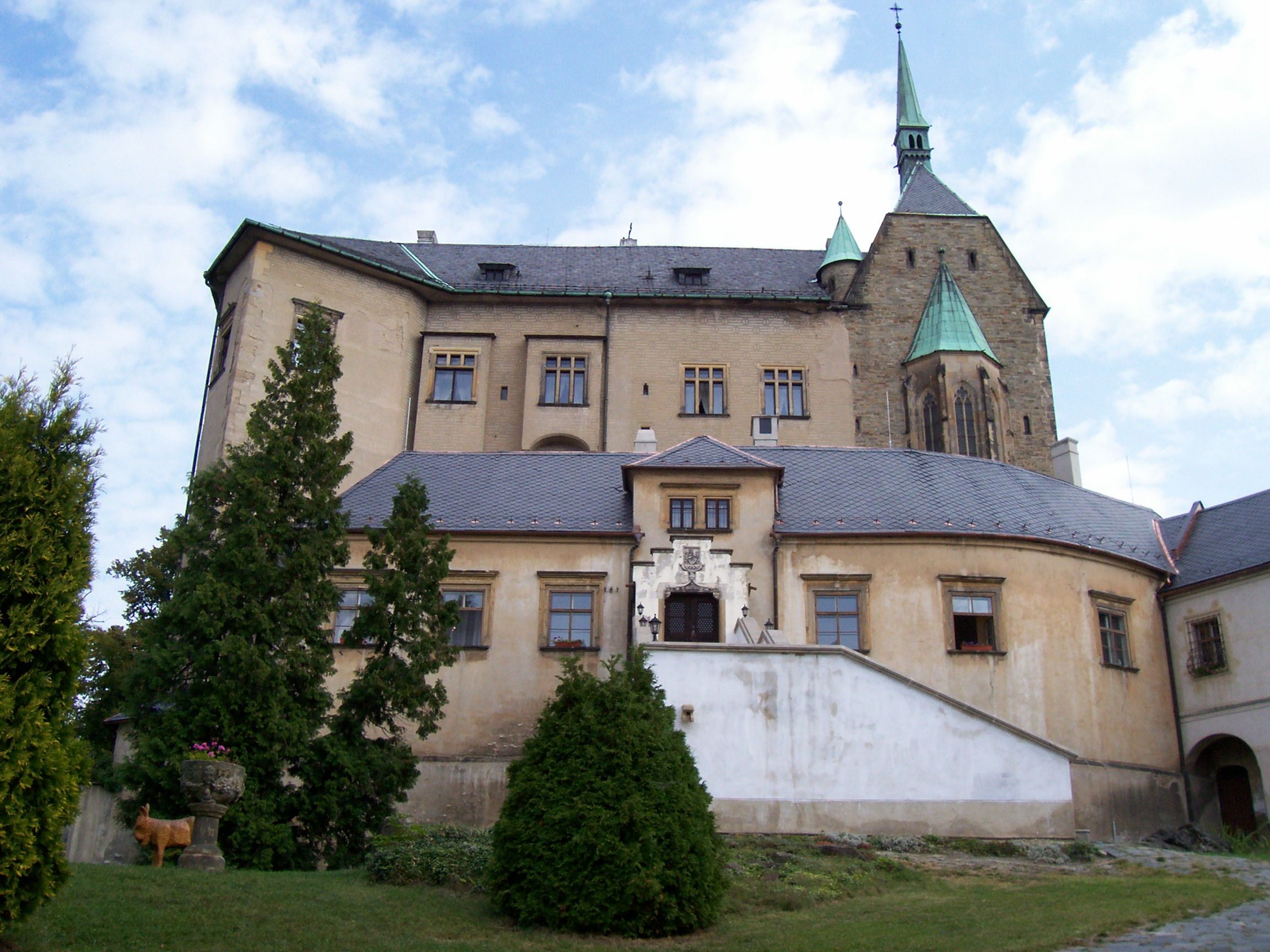
Šternberk Castle

The first written mention of Šternberk is from 1269, when the Šternberk Castle appeared in a deed of King Ottokar II of Bohemia. The castle was founded between 1253 and 1269. The town of Šternberk was first mentioned in 1296, in a deed of the Šternberk's owner, Albert of Šternberk. Although it was referred to as a town, it did not become a full-fledged town until the turn of the 14th and 15th centuries.

Albert of Šternberk colonised the town with German colonist, which led to an ethnically mixed population. The Lords of Šternberk gradually expanded the estate. The town developed mainly during the rule of Albert II of Šternberk, who had built the town walls and founded the local Augustinian monastery in 1371. After the death of Petr of Šternberk in 1397, the Šternberk estate was inherited by the Lords of Kravaře.

The Lords of Kravaře further improved the town. During the Hussite Wars in 1430, the town was conquered by the Hussites. After the death of the last male member of the Lords of Kravaře, Šternberk further changed its owners, which were the families of Kostka of Postupice (1466–1480), Berka of Dubá (1480–1570), Dukes of Münsterberg (1570–1647), and House of Württemberg (1647–1693).

In 1633–1634, Šternberk was devastated by a plague epidemic. In the 1640s, during the Thirty Years' War, the town was conquered and looted several times by the Swedish army. After the war, the population was predominantly German. In 1693, Šternberk was acquired by the Liechtenstein family, who owned it until 1945. New development did not occur until the second half of the 18th century. The town began to grow economically thanks to weaving.

Until 1918, Šternberk was part of Austria-Hungary, head of the district with the same name, one of the 34 Bezirkshauptmannschaften in Moravia.

In 1938, after the Munich Agreement, the town was annexed by Nazi Germany and administered as a part of the Reichsgau Sudetenland. The German-speaking population was expelled in 1945–1946 according to the Beneš decrees and replaced by Czech settlers.

== Demographics ==
Historical population

Year	Pop.	±%
1869	15,066	—
1880	15,750	+4.5%
1890	16,917	+7.4%
1900	17,890	+5.8%
1910	17,077	−4.5%

Year	Pop.	±%
1921	16,204	−5.1%
1930	15,532	−4.1%
1950	10,652	−31.4%
1961	11,873	+11.5%
1970	13,213	+11.3%

Year	Pop.	±%
1980	13,808	+4.5%
1991	14,611	+5.8%
2001	14,144	−3.2%
2011	13,574	−4.0%
2021	13,007	−4.2%

Source: Censuses

== Economy ==
The largest industrial company with headquarters in Šternberk is Keestrack CZ, a manufacturer of mobile sorting and crushing equipment with more than 500 employees. Other notable employer is the Psychiatric Hospital Šternberk, also with more than 500 employees.

Excalibur Army, part of Czechoslovak Group, manufactures and repairs military vehicles and artillery systems at its plant in Šternberk.

== Transport ==
The I/46 road from Olomouc to Opava runs through the town.

Šternberk is located on the railway line Šumperk–Vyškov.

== Sport ==
Šternberk is known for racing track called Ecce Homo, on which the eponymous hillclimbing car race is held annually. The first race was held here in 1905 and the tradition of regular Ecce Homo race began in 1921.

== Sights ==
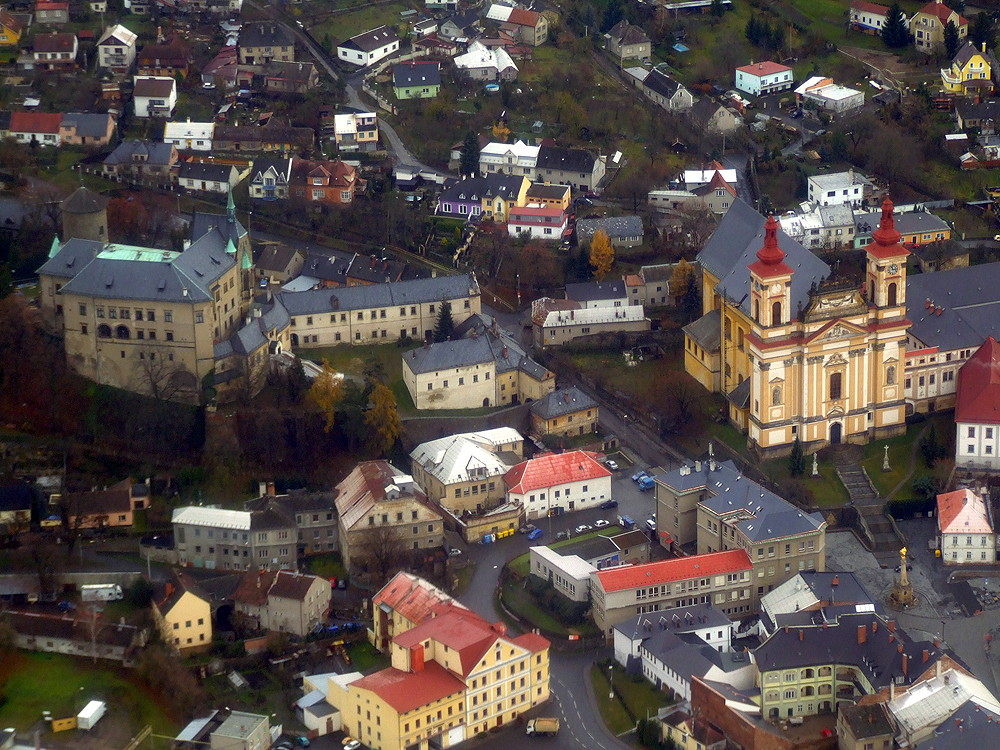
Aerial view of the historic centre

The main landmark of the town is the Šternberk Castle. The originally Gothic castle was reconstructed into a modern aristocratic residence in 1886. The castle forest park was founded in 1907–1909. Today the state-owned castle is open to the public and offers guided tours. The castle is protected as a national cultural monument.

The former Augustinian monastery is a valuable Baroque monument. After it was used as barracks, a German grammar school and a textile warehouse, the building was repaired and today contains museum expositions and exhibition spaces, including the gallery of painter Johann Christoph Handke.

The Church of the Annunciation was founded together with the monastery in 1371. After it burned down two times, the original Gothic church was demolished in 1775, and a new Neoclassical church was built on its site in 1775–1783. After the monastery was abolished, the church became a parish church. It contains paintings by Josef Winterhalder the Younger and Leopold Kupelwieser. The chapel is decorated by a rare ceiling painting by Johann Christoph Handke, depicting the history of Šternberk.

== Notable people ==
- Eduard Reich (1836–1919), physician
- Oscar Gelbfuhs (1852–1877), chess player
- Walter von Molo (1880–1958), chess player
- Lubor Tokoš (1923–2003), actor
- Erica Pedretti (born 1930), Swiss writer and artist
- Eckhart Schmidt (born 1938), German film director
- Hana Maciuchová (1945–2021), actress
- Mikuláš Bek (born 1964), musicologist and politician
- Robert Hock (born 1973), German ice hockey player
- Adriana Gerši (born 1976), tennis player
- Patrik Siegl (born 1976), footballer
- Tomáš Žižka (born 1979), ice hockey player
- David Rozehnal (born 1980), footballer
- Jana Doleželová (born 1981), actress and model, Miss Czech Republic 2004
- Petr Vrána (born 1985), ice hockey player
- David Krejčí (born 1986), ice hockey player
- Gabriela Vařeková (born 1987), rower
- Blanka Škodová (born 1997), ice hockey player
- Václav Chaloupka (born 1998), slalom canoeist

== Twin towns – sister cities ==
Šternberk is twinned with:

- Dobšiná, Slovakia
- Günzburg, Germany
- Kobiór, Poland
- Kungsbacka, Sweden
- Lorsch, Germany

== Gallery ==
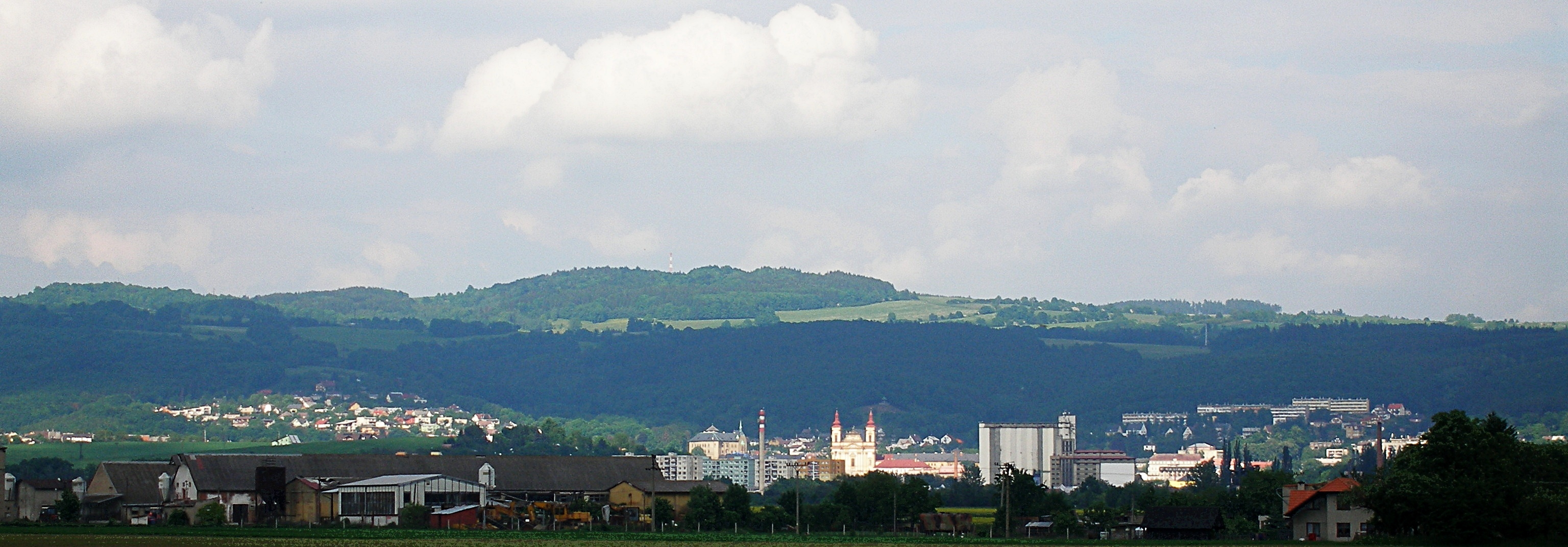
Panorama of the town

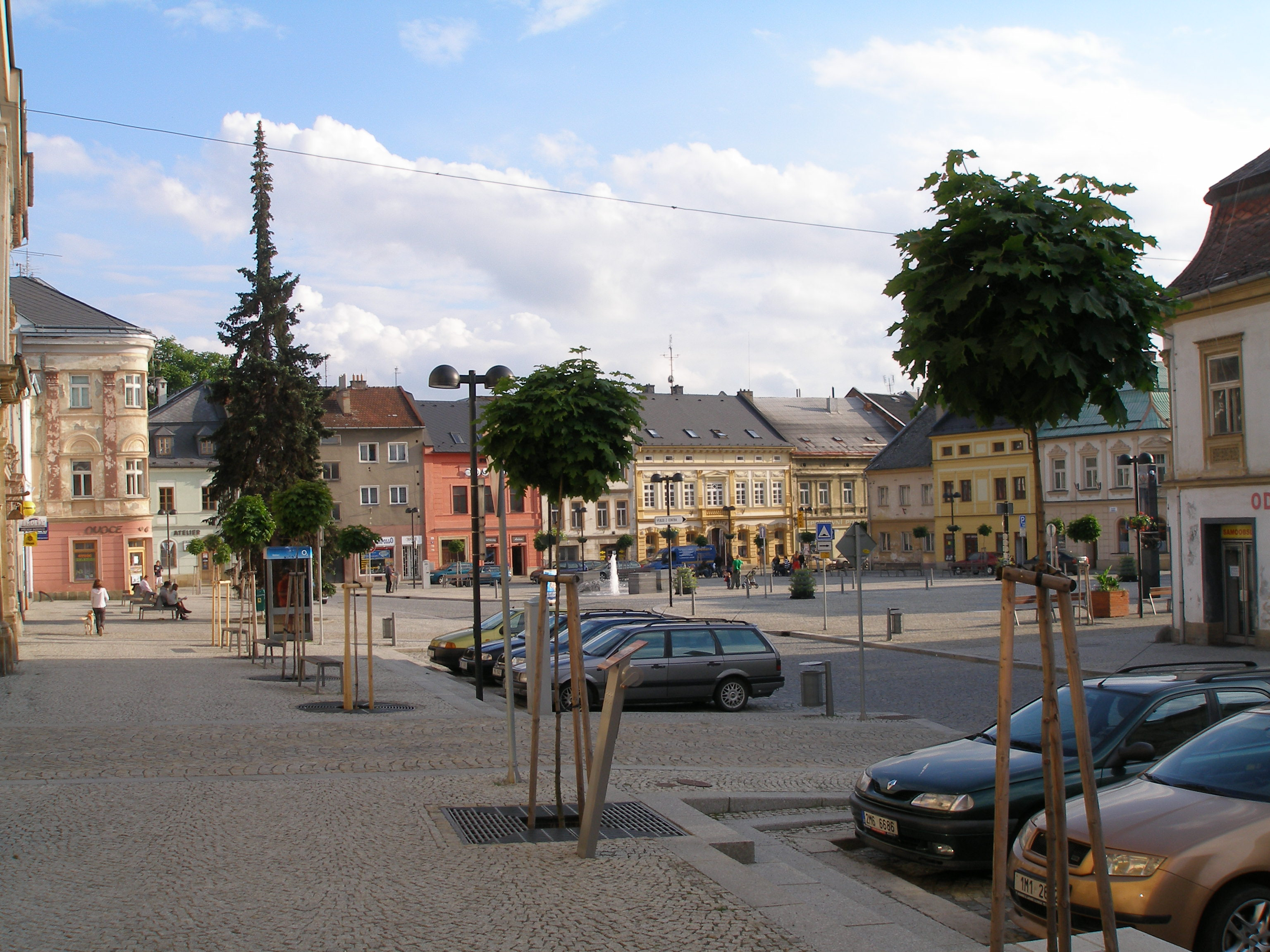
The square Hlavní náměstí

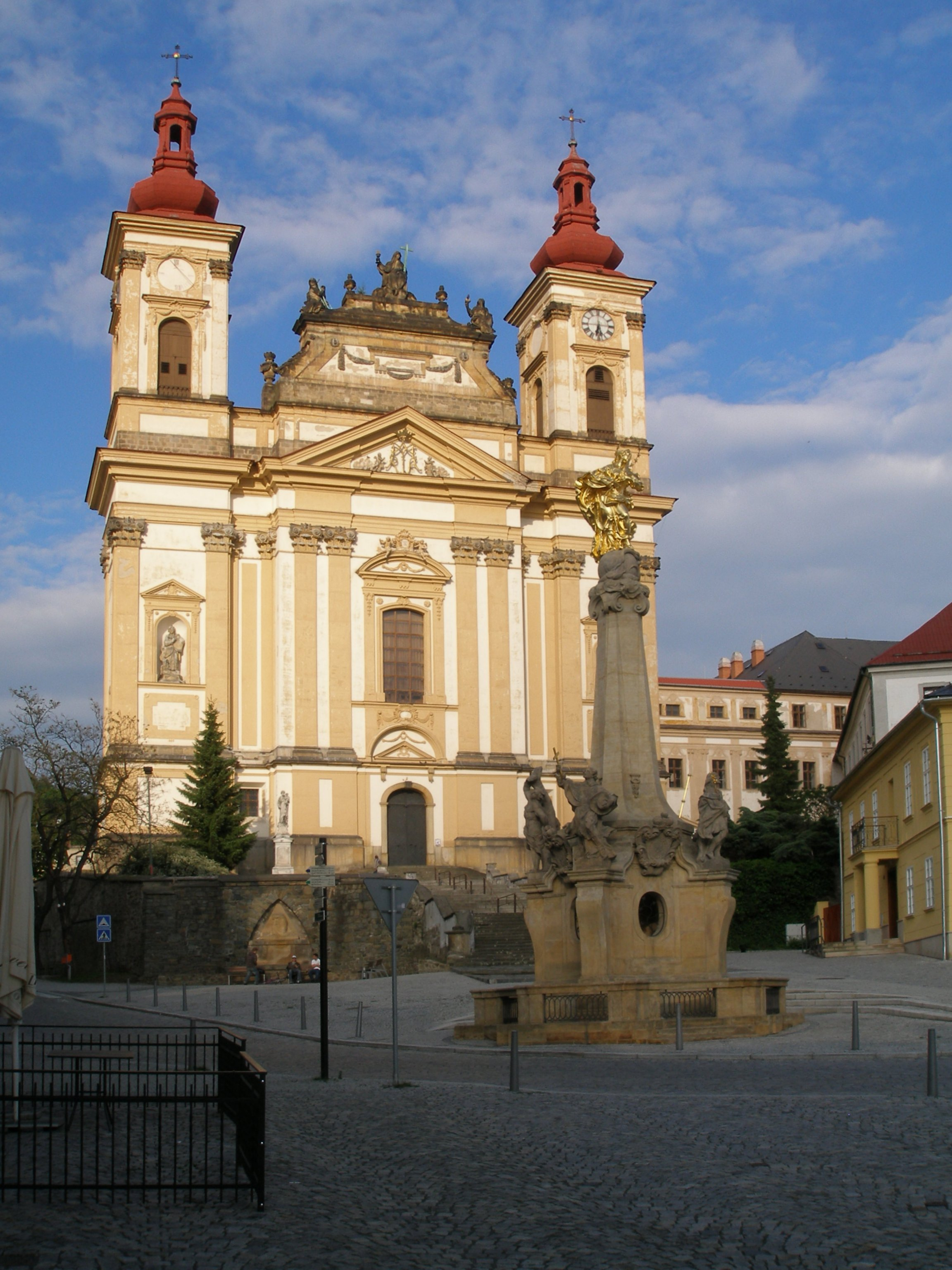
Church of the Annunciation and Marian column
