= Bushman (disambiguation) =

The Bushmen, or San, are the indigenous people of southern Africa who do not herd cattle.

Bushman or bushmen may also refer to:

- Bushman (character), a Marvel Comics supervillain
- Bushman (reggae singer) (born 1973), Jamaican musician
- Bushman contingents, formations of Australian mounted troops who fought in the Second Boer War
- World Famous Bushman, San Francisco busker
- People who live in the Alaskan bush
- People who live in the Australian or New Zealand bush
- "An Old Bushman", the pseudonym of British naturalist Horace William Wheelwright (1815–1865)
- Bushman, a 1971 film by David Schickele

== People with the surname Bushman ==
- Brad Bushman (born 1960), American psychologist
- Claudia Lauper Bushman (born 1934), American historian specializing in Mormon women's history
- Matt Bushman (born 1995), American football player
- Francis X. Bushman (1883–1966), American actor and director
- Francis X. Bushman Jr. (1903–1978), American actor
- Lindsay Bushman (1994), American actress
- Richard Bushman (born 1931), American historian and Mormon scholar
- Yuriy Bushman (born 1990), Ukrainian footballer

== See also ==
- Buschmann, a surname
