= Rowing at the 2004 Summer Olympics – Women's double sculls =

Women's double sculls at the Games of the XXVIII Olympiad

Medalists
| 1st place, gold medalist(s) | | Georgina Evers-Swindell; Caroline Evers-Swindell | New Zealand |
| 2nd place, silver medalist(s) | | Peggy Waleska; Britta Oppelt | Germany |
| 3rd place, bronze medalist(s) | | Sarah Winckless; Elise Laverick | Great Britain |

These are the results of the Women's double sculls competition, one of six events for female competitors in Rowing at the 2004 Summer Olympics in Athens.

== Double Sculls women ==
| Gold: | Silver: | Bronze: |
|---|---|---|
| New Zealand; Georgina Evers-Swindell; Caroline Evers-Swindell | Germany; Peggy Waleska; Britta Oppelt | Great Britain; Sarah Winckless; Elise Laverick |

== Heats ==
=== Heat 1 - August 14, 11:00 ===
| Rank | Rowers | Country | Time |
|---|---|---|---|
| 1 | Georgina Evers-Swindell & Caroline Evers-Swindell | New Zealand | 7:25.57 |
| 2 | Sarah Winckless & Elise Laverick | Great Britain | 7:29.75 |
| 3 | Nataliya Huba & Svitlana Maziy | Ukraine | 7:39.02 |
| 4 | Caroline Delas & Gaelle Buniet | France | 7:41.23 |
| 5 | Olga Samulenkova & Yuliya Kalinovskaya | Russia | 7:54.75 |

=== Heat 2 - August 14, 11:10 ===
| Rank | Rowers | Country | Time |
|---|---|---|---|
| 1 | Peggy Waleska & Britta Oppelt | Germany | 7:28.89 |
| 2 | Anet-Jacqueline Buschmann & Miglena Markova | Bulgaria | 7:35.46 |
| 3 | Camelia Mihalcea & Simona Strimbeschi | Romania | 7:39.32 |
| 4 | Donna Martin & Jane Robinson | Australia | 7:41.20 |
| 5 | Elisabetta Sancassani & Gabriella Bascelli | Italy | 7:46.66 |

== Final ==
| Rank | Rowers | Country | Time |
|---|---|---|---|
| Gold medal | Georgina Evers-Swindell & Caroline Evers-Swindell | New Zealand | 7:01.79 |
| Silver medal | Peggy Waleska & Britta Oppelt | Germany | 7:02.78 |
| Bronze medal | Sarah Winckless & Elise Laverick | Great Britain | 7:07.58 |
| 4 | Anet-Jacqueline Buschmann & Miglena Markova | Bulgaria | 7:13.97 |
| 5 | Camelia Mihalcea & Simona Strimbeschi | Romania | 7:17.58 |
| 6 | Nataliya Guba & Svitlana Maziy | Ukraine | 7:21.78 |
