= Nataliya Huba =

Ukrainian rower

Personal information
- Full name: Nataliya Petrivna Huba
- Nationality: Ukrainian
- Born: 11 March 1978 (age 48) Dnipropetrovsk, Ukrainian SSR, Soviet Union

Sport
- Sport: Rowing
Medal record
Women's rowing
Representing Ukraine
European Rowing Championships
Gold medal – first place	2007 European Rowing Championships, Poznań	W4x
Bronze medal – third place	2009 European Rowing Championships, Brest	Eights
Gold medal – first place	2011 European Rowing Championships, Plovdiv	Quad Pairs

Nataliya Huba (born 11 March 1978) is a Ukrainian rower. She competed in the women's double sculls event at the 2004 Summer Olympics.

== Competitive History ==
Nataliya Huba participated in rhythmic gymnastics, swimming, athletics from an early age, and from the age of 10 she specialized in rowing.

- 1993, she won the first place at the youth games of Ukraine, along with her team.
- 1995 she won bronze at the youth world rowing championship in eights.
- 1996 at the youth world championship was the fifth in the fours of the doubles.
- 2001, she competed at the Ukraine Championships in the doubles competition.
- 2004, in doubles with Svetlana Maziy, she took fourth at the Olympiad in Athens.
