= Christiane Huth =

German rower (born 1980)

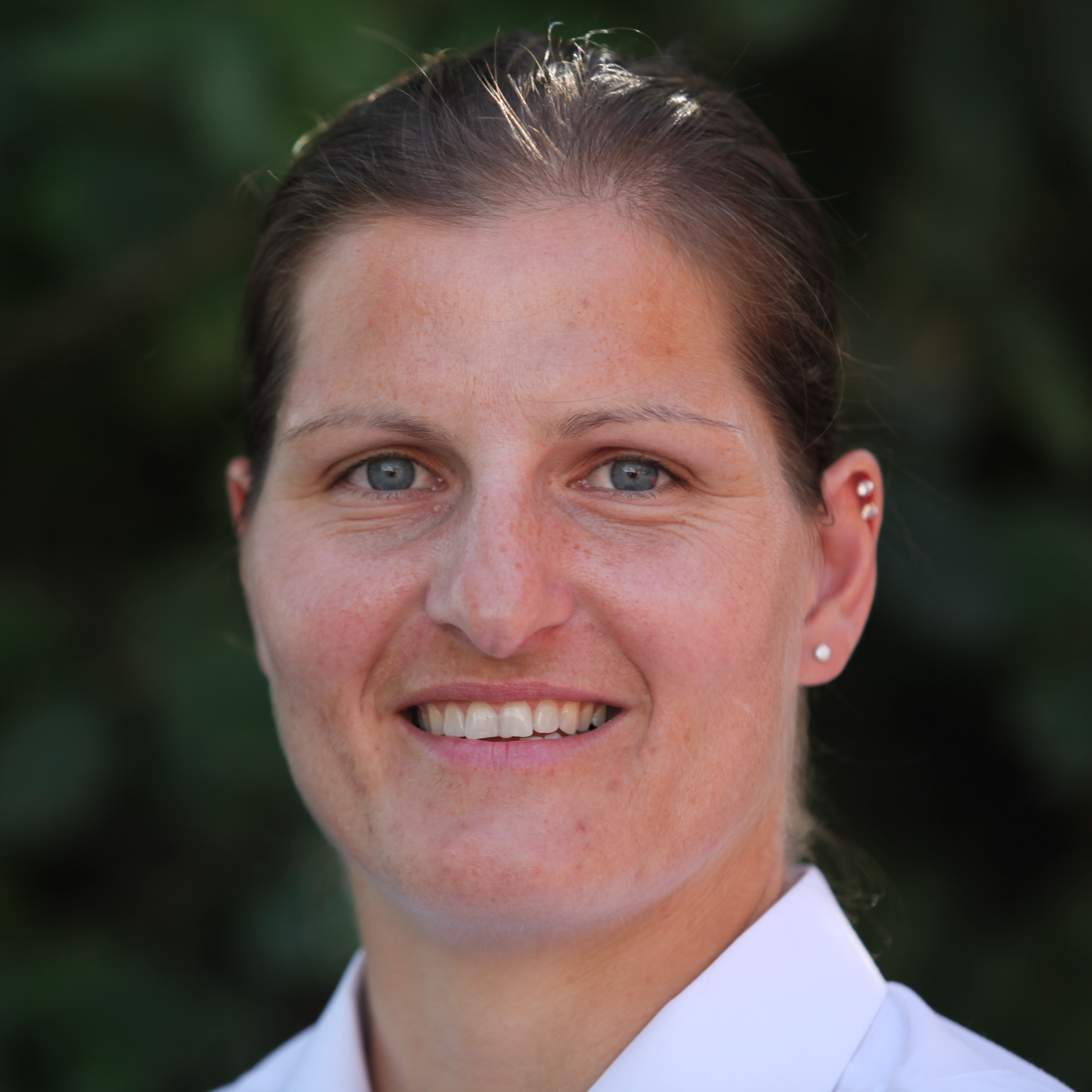
- Christiane Huth in 2014

Personal information
- Born: 12 September 1980 (age 45)

Sport
- Sport: Rowing
Medal record
Representing Germany
Women's Rowing
Olympic Games
Silver medal – second place	2008 Beijing	Double sculls
World Championships
Bronze medal – third place	2006 Eton	W4x

Christiane Huth (born 12 September 1980, Suhl, East Germany) is a German rower. She competed at the 2008 Summer Olympics, where she won a silver medal in double sculls.
