= Anna Watkins =

British rower

Anna Watkins MBE
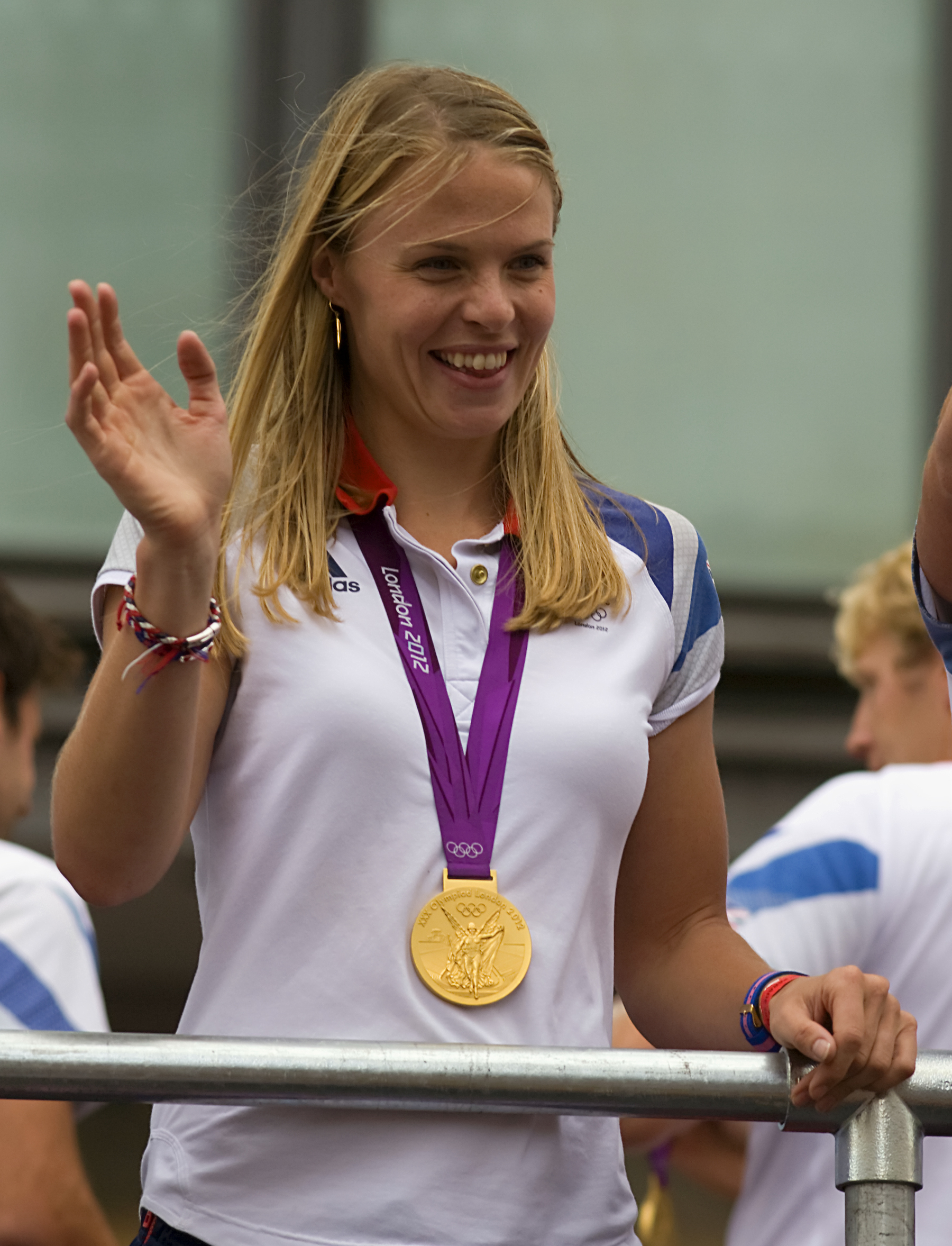

Personal information
- Full name: Anna Rose Watkins
- Nationality: United Kingdom
- Born: Anna Rose Bebington; 13 February 1983 (age 43) Leek, Staffordshire, England
- Home town: Wokingham, Berkshire, England
- Education: Newnham College, Cambridge
- Occupation: Student
- Years active: 2001–
- Height: 6 ft 1 in (1.85 m)
- Website: AnnaWatkins.co.uk

Sport
- Country: Great Britain
- Sport: Rowing
- Event: Double sculls
- University team: Newnham College Boat Club
- Club: Rob Roy Boat Club; Leander Club
- Turned pro: 2003
Medal record
Women's rowing
Representing Great Britain
Olympic Games
Gold medal – first place	2012 London	Double sculls
Bronze medal – third place	2008 Beijing	Double sculls
World Championships
Gold medal – first place	2010 Karapiro	Double sculls
Gold medal – first place	2011 Bled	Double sculls
Silver medal – second place	2009 Poznań	Double sculls
Bronze medal – third place	2007 Munich	Double sculls

Anna Rose Watkins (née Bebington; born 13 February 1983) is a British rower.

A double Olympian, Watkins won a bronze medal at the 2008 Summer Olympics, and a gold medal at the 2012 Summer Olympics, both in the double sculls. She has also won four medals in the World Championships, winning gold in successive years, in 2010 and in 2011.

== Early life ==
Watkins was born and raised in Leek, Staffordshire, where she attended Westwood College. She studied Natural Sciences at Newnham College, Cambridge, where she started rowing in 2001.

== Sporting career ==
She took her first strokes with Newnham College Boat Club and was captain of lower boats and then secretary for the club. Watkins represents Leander Club in rowing events.

At Cambridge, her college crew were Head of the Cam in 2003, before she moved onto the World Class Start talent identification programme run by UK sport, and based at Rob Roy Boat Club. In 2004, she made her international debut, winning a gold medal in the Coxless IVs at the World Under 23 Regatta in Poznań, Poland with crewmates Natasha Page, Beth Rodford and Alison Knowles.

In 2005, Watkins made her senior international debut with the Women's Eight, achieving a fifth place at the World Championships in Gifu, Japan. She also won an Under 23 bronze medal at the World U23 Rowing Championships in Amsterdam.

In 2006, Watkins switched to sculling and began competing in the double scull, a boat class she has remained with since then. The World Championships in 2006 were on home water at Eton Dorney. Watkins partnered Annabel Vernon, and they came in fourth place, having won the World Cup series earlier that season.

For the next two years, Watkins's partner was Elise Laverick. In this combination, they won bronze medals at both the World Championships and at the 2008 Beijing Olympics. The Olympic medal came after a difficult season battling with glandular fever, and at the time was the closest any British oarswoman had come to an Olympic gold with the three medal winning crews separated by 0.23 seconds.

In 2009, Watkins once more partnered Annabel Vernon and won a silver medal at the World Championships in Poznań, Poland.

In 2010, Watkins joined forces with Katherine Grainger for the first time. In their double scull they had an unbeaten season, culminating in their victory at the World Championships in New Zealand. They were named World Rowing Female Crew of the year and also "The Sunday Times Women's Sports Team of the Year" for 2010. Individually, Watkins became Champion of the Thames in the annual championships, the Wingfield Sculls.

In 2011, Watkins beat Grainger in the British Rowing Team trials. They joined forces again in the double scull and continued their unbeaten run, finishing the season with another World Championships gold. Watkins retained her title in the Wingfield Sculls, setting a new record time.

At the 2012 London Olympics, Watkins and Grainger broke the Olympic record in the semi-final of the double sculls. Subsequently, they won the final to take the gold medal.

Watkins was appointed Member of the Order of the British Empire (MBE) in the 2013 New Year Honours, for services to rowing.

In August 2015, six months after the birth of her second child, Watkins announced her intention to return to competition, and to target the 2016 Rio Olympics. Had she been successful, she would have been the first mother to represent Great Britain in rowing, and possibly the first woman to compete in consecutive Olympics whilst having two children in between.

In February 2016, she announced that she was pulling out of the British Olympic rowing programme for Rio 2016, citing her performance, saying "This is not a decision that I've taken lightly. I guess I would have always wondered about what might have been if I hadn't given it a go."

== Personal life ==
In September 2009, she married Oliver Watkins, a part-time rowing coach, who was studying for a PhD in engineering at Cambridge, where the couple met. The couple live in Wokingham, where Oliver works for the McLaren Formula One team as a suspension specialist. Anna announced in March 2013, that the couple were expecting their first child, due in September 2013. Anna gave birth to a boy which they named William James. Anna had a second boy in February 2015.

Anna holds a PhD in mathematics from the University of Reading.

== Achievements ==
=== Olympic Games ===
- 2012 London – Gold, Women's Double Sculls
- 2008 Beijing – Bronze, Women's Double Sculls

=== World Rowing Championships ===
- 2011 Bled – Gold, Double Scull
- 2010 Lake Karapiro – Gold, Double Scull
- 2009 Poznań – Silver, Double Scull
- 2007 Munich – Bronze, Double Scull
- 2006 Dorney Lake – 4th, Double Scull
- 2005 Gifu – 5th, Eight

=== World Rowing Under 23 Championships ===
- 2005 – Bronze, Coxless Pair
- 2004 – Gold, Coxless Four

=== GB Rowing Team Senior Trials ===
- 2012 – 2nd, Single Scull
- 2011 – 1st, Single Scull

== See also ==
- 2012 Summer Olympics and Paralympics gold post boxes
