= Eduard Reich =

Moravian doctor (1836–1919)

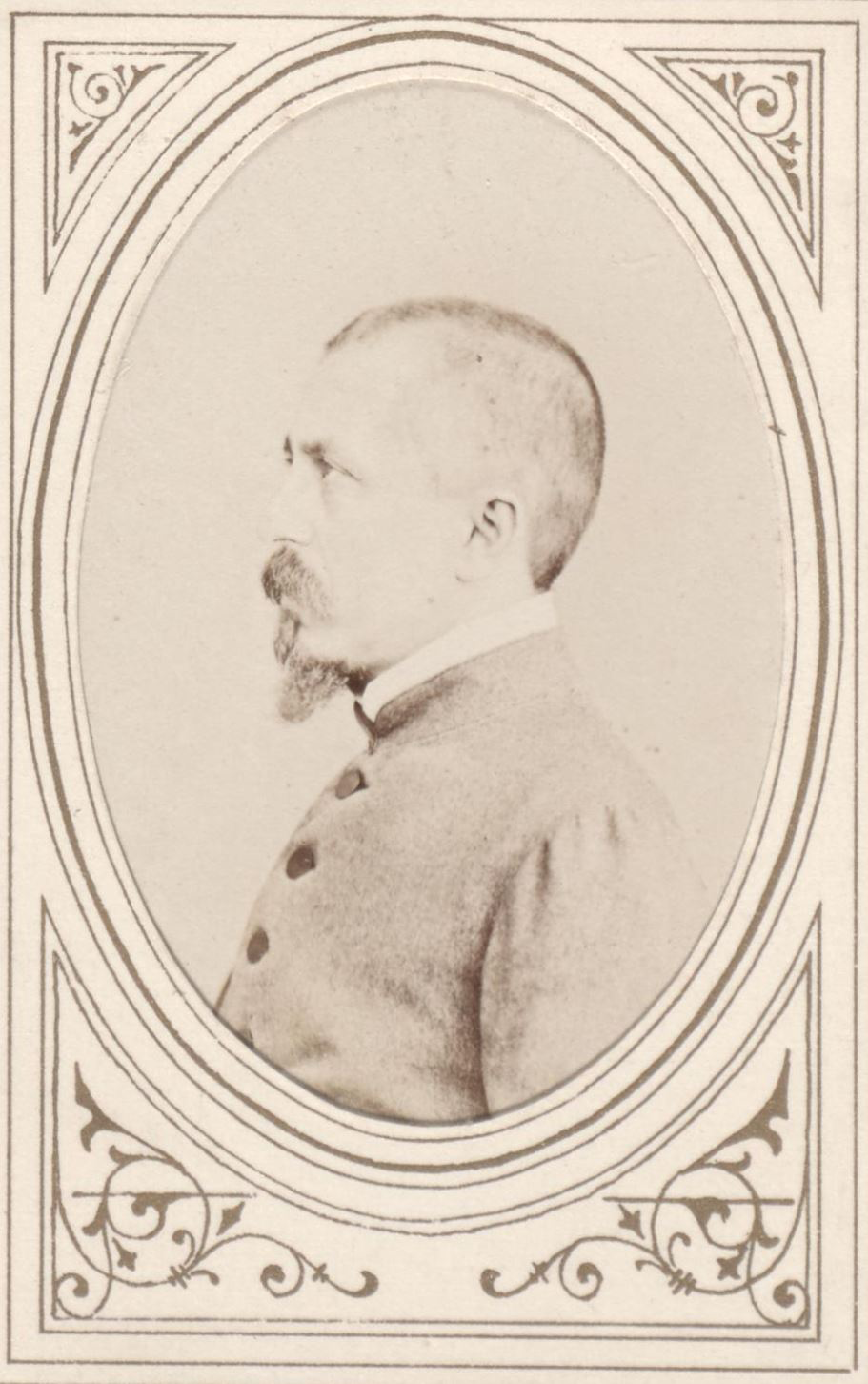
- Eduard Reich, Medical Scientist
- Born: 6 March 1836; Sternberg, Moravia
- Died: 1 February 1919 (aged 82); Muiderberg

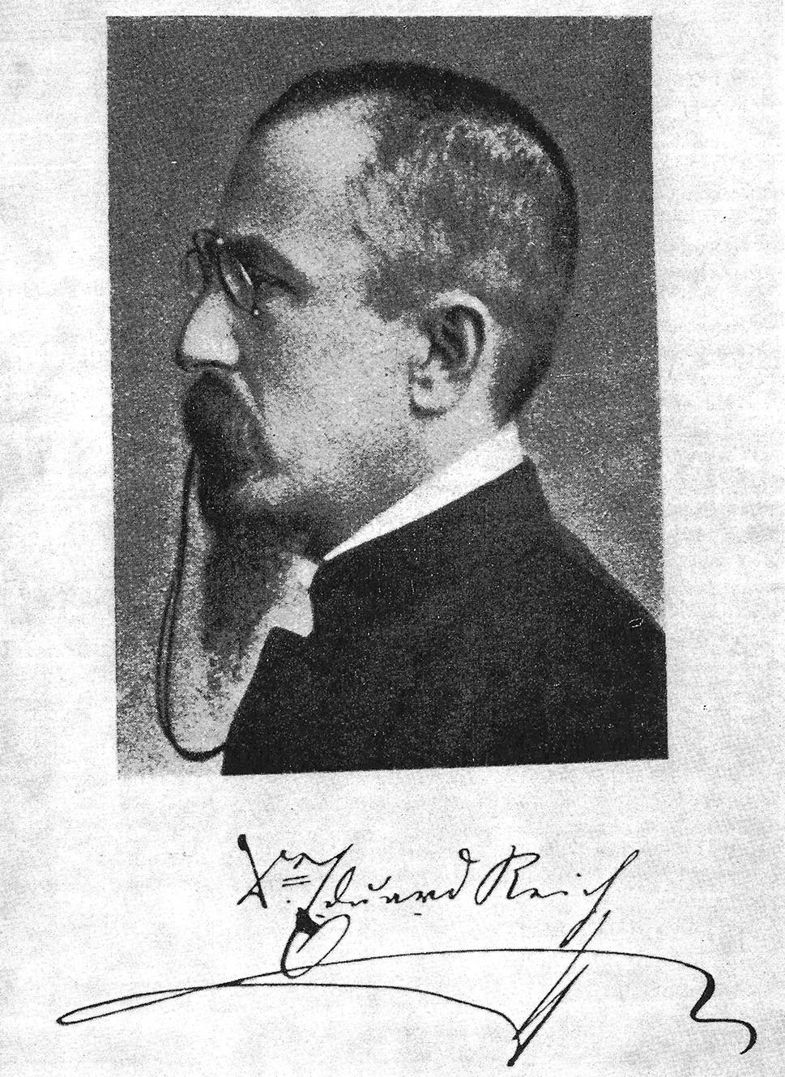
Eduard Reich and signature

Eduard Maria Anton Johann Reich was born on 6 March 1836 in Sternberg in Moravia (modern Šternberk, Czech Republic). He died on 1 February 1919 in Muiderberg near Amsterdam, in the Netherlands.

Reich, was Doctor of Medicine, specialising in Hygiene. He was Legal Director and Vice President of KL-C. Academy, a member of the French Society of Hygiene in Paris, the Society for Public Medicin in Paris, the Aetiological-Medicinal Society in Berlin, the Berlin Medical Society.

He held the post of Associate Professor of Medicine at the University of Bern.

In 1858, he attempted to establish the topic of hygiene as a separate academic discipline. His most influential work espoused the benefits of Moral and social hygiene examples in his books On the Degeneration of Men, its Sources and Prevention, and his System of Hygiene, 1870–71.

Reich was an early practitioner of sexology who attempted to address the question of nervousness and sexuality. He described the wide gap between women in primitive and modern society in his book Neurasthenia in women: its causes and prevention (1872), seeing masturbation in modern society as a primary cause of “degeneration” and the demise of entire nations due to neurasthenia because of the interaction of fantasy and emotionality.

He was an admirer of Darwin.
