= Olga Samulenkova =

Russian rower

Personal information
- Nationality: Russian
- Born: 30 June 1978 (age 46); Saint Petersburg, Russia

Sport
- Sport: Rowing

Olga Samulenkova (born 30 June 1978) is a Russian rower. She competed in the women's double sculls event at the 2004 Summer Olympics.
