= Elise Laverick =

British rower (born 1975)

Medal record

Women's Rowing

Representing Great Britain

Olympic Games
Bronze medal – third place	2004 Athens	Double sculls
Bronze medal – third place	2008 Beijing	Double sculls

World Championships
Bronze medal – third place	1997 Aiguebelette	Eight
Bronze medal – third place	2007 Munich	Double sculls

Elise Mary Sherwell (née Laverick, born 27 July 1975 in Rustington, West Sussex) is a British rower. She won bronze at the 2004 Summer Olympics in the double scull with Sarah Winckless, and again at the 2008 Summer Olympics with Anna Bebington. She won the Wingfield Sculls in 2007.

== Early life and education ==
Laverick was educated at Broadwater Manor School in Worthing for the early years of her youth and later at Rosemead School. She also studied the Double Bass at the Guildhall School of Music and Drama and later qualified as a Solicitor while training with British Olympic rowing team.

== Rowing career ==
Laverick won a bronze medal at the 2004 Summer Olympics in the double scull with Sarah Winckless, and again at the 2008 Summer Olympics with Anna Bebington where they missed the Gold Medal by 4 inches.

She won the Championship of the ThamesWingfield Sculls on the Thames in 2007.

She is a member of Thames Rowing Club in Putney, London, Leander Club at Henley and of Thames Valley Skiff Club at Walton on Thames and is also a former Skiff Champion.
