= Ionelia Zaharia =

Romanian rower

Personal information
- Born: 13 August 1985 (age 40) Răcari, Romania
Medal record
Women's Rowing
Representing Romania
World Championships
Silver medal – second place	2009 Poznań	W8+
Silver medal – second place	2013 Chungju	W8+
Bronze medal – third place	2010 Karapiro	W8+

Ionelia Zaharia (née Neacșu; born 13 August 1985) is a Romanian rower. She competed in the women's Double Sculls at the 2008 Summer Olympics.
