= Sarah Winckless =

British rower

Sarah Winckless MBE
Personal information
- Born: 18 October 1973 (age 52) Reading, Berkshire, England
Medal record
Women's rowing
Representing Great Britain
Olympic Games
| Bronze medal – third place | 2004 Athens | Double sculls |
World Rowing Championships
| Gold medal – first place | 2005 Gifu | Women's quad |
| Gold medal – first place | 2006 Eton | Women's quad |

Sarah Katharine Winckless (born 18 October 1973) is a British former rower. She won a bronze medal in Double sculls with her partner Elise Laverick at the 2004 Athens Olympic Games and was twice world champion, in 2005 and 2006.

== Early life and education ==
Winckless was born in Reading, was educated at Tiffin Girls' School and at Millfield, and began rowing whilst at Cambridge University, where she studied Natural Sciences at Fitzwilliam College.

== Career ==
Winckless made her debut for Great Britain in the women's eight at the World Championships in 1998 and finished eighth. She then transferred to sculling, finishing ninth in the double at the 2000 Olympic Games. She was in GB quadruple scull crews that narrowly missed out on the medals at the 2002 and 2003 World Championships, finishing fourth both times. She teamed up with Elise Laverick for the double scull from 2004 on, producing good results in the World Cup season before taking Olympic bronze in the 2004 Games held in Athens. She returned to the quad for the 2005 and 2006 world championships, winning with Rebecca Romero, Frances Houghton and Katherine Grainger in 2005 and Debbie Flood, Houghton & Grainger in 2006. She was unable to compete in 2007, due to injury, but returned to the GB team for the 2008 Olympic Games, racing in the Women's eight.

She announced her retirement from rowing in April 2009.

She was the UK Chef de Mission for the Youth Olympic Games and served as the inaugural Chairman of the BOA's Athletes Commission. She was the first woman to be appointed as a Boat Race umpire, and in 2020 she would have been the first woman to umpire the men's Boat Race; as the race was cancelled, she achieved this in 2021.

She serves on the Athletes Commission and the Board of UK Anti-Doping. She was awarded an MBE in the Queen's Birthday Honours 2015 for "services to sport and young people".

== Personal life ==
Winckless is a campaigner for Huntington's disease charities, having tested positive for the gene mutation while she was at university. She is a patron of the Scottish Huntington's Association. Her parents are Bob Winckless, a three times Cambridge Blue (1967, 1968 and 1969) and Valerie Winckless. Her mother later remarried to Olympic rower Michael Hart.
