= Huntington's Disease Association =

UK charity

- Founded: 1986
- Purpose: Care and support for people affected by Huntington's disease
- Location: Liverpool, England
- Region served: England and Wales
- Key people: Cath Stanley (CEO); Tony Hadley (patron); Shane Richie (patron); George Rainsford (patron)
- Website: www.hda.org.uk

The Huntington's Disease Association (HDA) is a charity that supports people in England and Wales affected by the genetic neurodegenerative brain condition Huntington's disease (HD).

The HDA was founded in 1986 and is based in Liverpool. It supports a network of regional care advisors who offer care and support to people with and at risk of Huntington's disease and their families. The HDA also has a research programme that supports scientific and social research into HD. It has worked to establish and support a network of multidisciplinary clinics for HD patients in the UK.

The charity was instrumental in the 2010 launch of an All-Party Parliamentary Group for Huntington's disease in the UK Parliament, chaired by Lord Walton of Detchant, and 2010 research revealing that the prevalence of HD is much higher than previously thought.

The HDA won the 2005 UK Charity Award for healthcare and medical research and the 2005 National Health Service (NHS) Health and Social Care Award for long term conditions.

The HDA's patrons are singer Tony Hadley and entertainer Shane Richie.

The HDA is part of the UK HD Alliance, along with the Scottish Huntington's Association and HD Association Northern Ireland. It is also a member of the International Huntington Alliance.
