= Gabriela Vařeková =

Czech rower (born 1987)

Personal information
- Born: 18 June 1987 (age 39) Šternberk, Czechoslovakia
- Height: 174 cm (5 ft 9 in)
- Weight: 75 kg (165 lb)

Sport
- Sport: Rowing
Medal record
Women's rowing
Representing the Czech Republic
European Rowing Championships
Gold medal – first place	2007 Poznań	Double scull

Gabriela Vařeková (born 18 June 1987) is a Czech rower. She competed at the 2008 Summer Olympics in Beijing with the women's double sculls where they came sixth.
