= Elisabetta Sancassani =

Italian rower

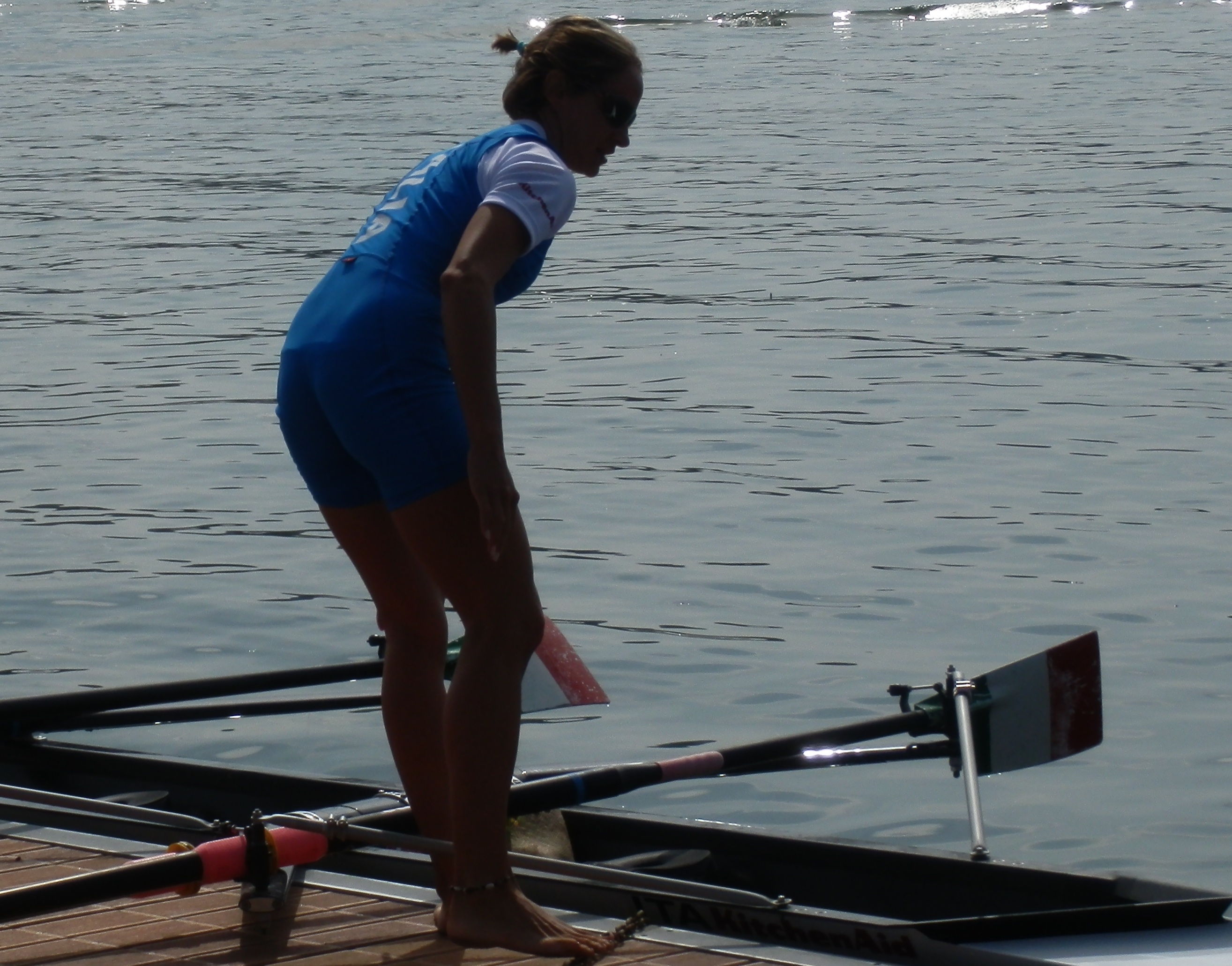

Personal information
- Born: Maria Elisabetta Sancassani; 6 February 1983 (age 43) Lecco, Italy
- Height: 176 cm (5 ft 9 in)
- Weight: 69 kg (152 lb)

Sport
- Country: Italy
- Sport: Women's rowing
- Event: Lightweight / sculls
Medal record
Women's rowing
Representing Italy
World Championships
Gold medal – first place	2013 Chungjiu	LW2x
European Championships
Gold medal – first place	2014 Belgrade	LW2x
Mediterranean Games
Gold medal – first place	2005 Almería	Single Sculls

Maria Elisabetta Sancassani (born 6 February 1983) is an Italian female competition rower. A gold medal winner at the 2005 Mediterranean Games she twice represented her native country at the Summer Olympics, in 2004 and 2008. She began competing as a lightweight in 2012 and won the women's lightweight double scull in 2013 with Laura Milani, both at the European Rowing Championships and the World Rowing Championships.

She is the younger sister of nine-time world champion rower Franco Sancassani.
