= Miglena Markova =

Bulgarian rower (born 1983)

Medal record

Women's rowing

Representing Bulgaria

World Rowing Championships
Silver medal – second place	2005 Gifu	W2x
Bronze medal – third place	2009 Poznań	W2x

Miglena Markova (Bulgarian: Миглена Мaркова, born 16 February 1983 in Sofia) is a Bulgarian rower. Miglena is a long-time national competitor in the national rowing team. At his first international competition in 2000. placed eighth in the coxswain four at the world championships for juniors and girls in Zagreb (Croatia). In 2001, he became vice world champion in the skiff discipline. Multiple rowing World Cup participant. Multiple champion of Bulgaria, Balkan champion. Along with Anet-Jacqueline Buschmann she finished 4th in the women's double sculls at the 2004 Summer Olympics. In 2005, in tandem with Rumyana Neykova, they won the world cup in rowing, finishing with victory in all three rounds. A month later, they became vice world champions at the championship in Gifu (Japan). For the next few years, she devoted herself to raising her first-born son Valentin. In 2009, he returned to the boat again in tandem with Rumyana Neykova. They won a bronze medal at the world cup in Lucerne, and a month later they became third in the world. This is Miglena's last international competition.

Since 2005, she has been happily married to a former professional football player, and currently a professional football coach, Alyosha Andonov. In addition to a son, Miglena also has a daughter named Maraya.
