= Patrik Siegl =

Czech footballer

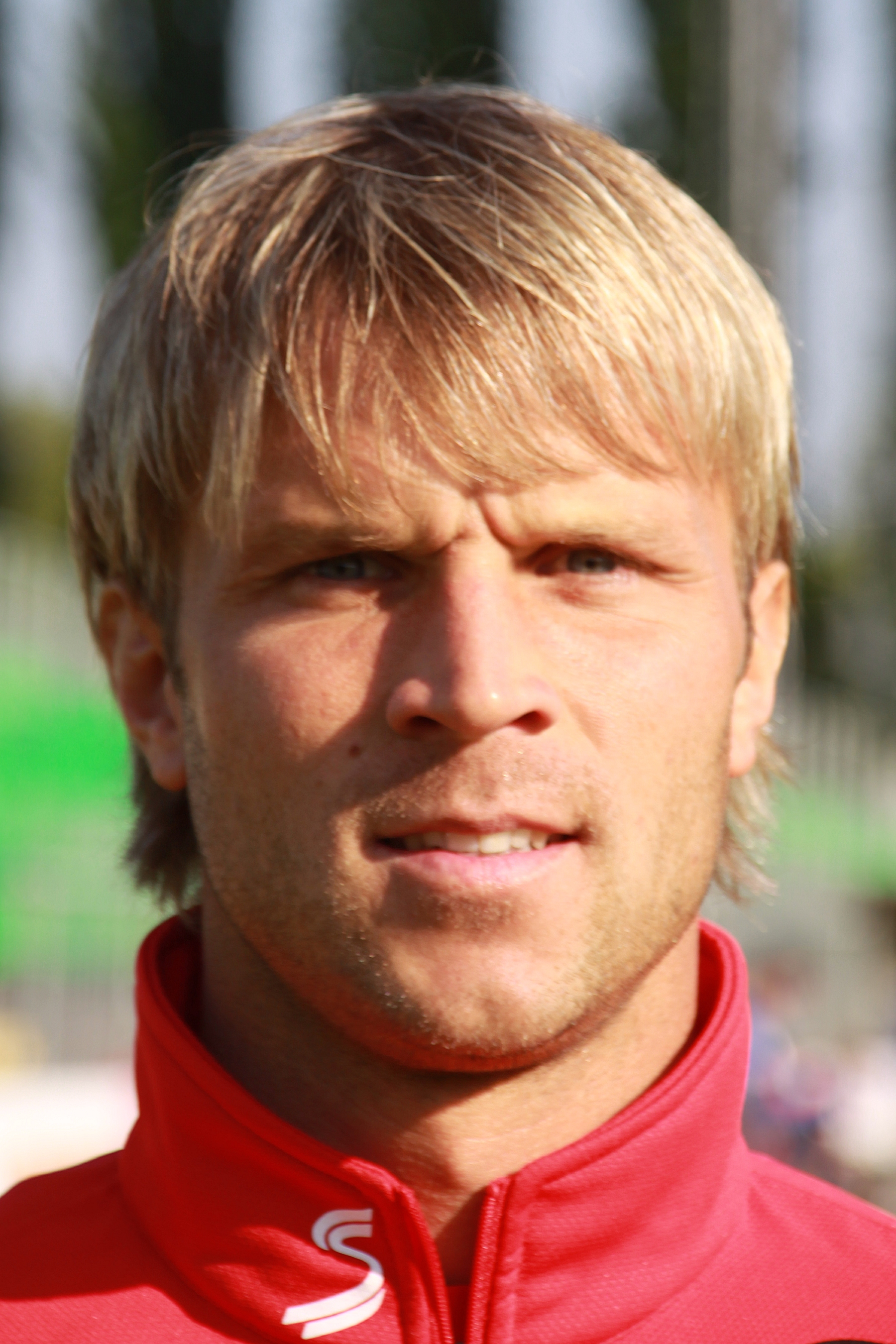

Personal information
- Date of birth: 26 February 1976 (age 50)
- Place of birth: Šternberk, Czechoslovakia
- Height: 1.80 m (5 ft 11 in)
- Position: Midfielder

Youth career
- 1981–1990: Unex Uničov
- 1990–1993: FC Vítkovice

Senior career*
Years	Team	Apps	(Gls)
1993–1994	FC Vítkovice	4	(0)
1994–1995	VTJ Znojmo		
1995–2001	Boby Brno	157	(20)
2001–2003	Sigma Olomouc	81	(13)
2004–	→ SSV Jahn Regensburg (Loan)	10	(0)
2004–2008	1. FC Brno	110	(3)
2008–2010	Kapfenberger SV	68	(8)
2010–2012	FK Fotbal Třinec	29	(1)

International career^{‡}
1993–1994	Czech Republic U-18	2	(0)
1996–1997	Czech Republic U-21	9	(3)
- * Club domestic league appearances and goals as of 13 May 2010 ‡ National team caps and goals as of August 2008

Patrik Siegl (born 26 February 1976, in Šternberk) is a former Czech football player who lastly played for FK Fotbal Třinec. He played predominantly as a midfielder.

== Career ==
His career started in Unex Uničov where he played as a youngster. At the age of 17 he joined the youth team at FC Vítkovice and after some solid performances for the juniors he also managed to make 4 appearances for the senior team in the Czechoslovak First Division.

Following his spell at FC Vítkovice he joined VTJ Znojmo for the 1994/95 season making just 6 appearances for the club. After his season with Znojmo he made his move to 1st Division outfit Boby Brno. He had a very successful stay at this club becoming a key member of the squad. After 5 and a half years at Brno he had amassed 157 first team appearances scoring a total of 20 goals from midfield.

His great run in Boby Brno was followed by another successful spell in the Czech first division with outfit SK Sigma Olomouc where he spent a total of 3 seasons, again becoming an integral part of the team and netting 13 goals in 81 appearances for the club. His good form had begun to generate interest from bigger clubs outside of the Czech Republic and in 2004 he completed a loan move to 2.Bundesliga team SSV Jahn Regensburg in Germany to test his abilities abroad. His spell however proved fruitless and Jahn Regensburg were relegated and the end of the season. Siegl had managed to make 10 appearances during his spell.

He returned to the Czech republic and decided to rejoin his former club 1. FC Brno, where he had previously experienced so much success. His second spell with the club stretched on for 4 years with Siegl making 110 appearances and scoring 3 goals. In the 2006–07 Czech First League, Siegl was one of four players in the league to play every minute of every match.

At the end of the 2007/08 season he pined for another move abroad and secured a transfer to newly promoted Kapfenberger SV in the Austrian Bundesliga. This proved a good spell as well with the team managing to stay up in the top tier of Austrian football. In his two seasons Siegl completed 68 appearances finding the net 8 times.

In 2010 at the age of 34 he returned to the Czech republic signing on with Czech 2. Liga side FK Fotbal Třinec.

== National team ==
He has represented the Czech Republic in both the Under-18 and Under-21 teams from 1993 to 1997, scoring 3 goals for the U-21.
