= Anet-Jacqueline Buschmann =

Bulgarian rower

Anet-Jacqueline Buschmann (Bulgarian: Анет-Жаклин Бушман; born 18 December 1982, in Varna) is a Bulgarian rower. Along with Miglena Markova she finished 4th in the women's double sculls at the 2004 Summer Olympics.
