= Catriona Sens =

Australian rower (born 1980)

Medal record

Women's rowing

Representing Australia

World Rowing Championships
Silver medal – second place	2006 Eton	Quad scull

Catriona Sens (née Oliver) (born 2 April 1980 in Sale, Victoria) is an Australian former representative rower. She was a national champion, an underage 2002 world champion, a dual Olympian and won a silver medal at the 2006 World Rowing Championships. She rowed in the Australian women's eight at the 2004 Athens Olympics and in the double scull at the 2008 Beijing Olympics.

== Club, state and national rowing career ==
Sens-Oliver's club rowing was from the Melbourne University Boat Club.

At the 2000 Australian Rowing Championships she rowed in MUBC colours in the U23 division in a single and a double scull. In 2002 she raced in the open division in the double and quad scull placing 2nd in both and the following year still in MUBC colours she raced the single and the double scull and again placed second in both.

At the 2003 Henley Royal Regatta Sens-Oliver representing the Australian Institute of Sport won the Princess Royal Challenge Cup for single sculls beating out her Australian training mate Donna Martin.

In 2004 she again placed second in club colours at the Australian Championships, this time in a composite quad scull with other members of the Australian senior squad women's squad vying for Olympic selection. Following the 2004 Olympics and now married to German rower Robert Sens, Sens-Oliver received a suspended two-year ban from national teams after slapping fellow rower Sally Robbins but in 2006 she was back racing and at the 2006 Australian Rowing Championships she finally won a national title in MUBC colours as the stroke of a women's quad scull. She also raced the double scull that year. At the 2007 Australian Championships she rowed in a composite crew contesting the national quad scull title and again came away with silver. At her final Australian Championships tilt in 2008 preparation for Australian Olympic selection she rowed in a composite double scull which placed third. Nonetheless, Sens-Oliver was selected in the Australian 2008 Olympic double with Sonia Mills.

She made her state representative debut in the Victorian women's youth eight of 1999 which contested the Bicentennial Cup at the Interstate Regatta within the Australian Rowing Championships. The following year she stroked the Victorian youth eight to a victory at the Interstate Regatta. In 2001 she was the Victorian state representative selected to row the single scull for the Nell Slatter Trophy at the Interstate Regatta. She placed sixth and last.

From 2002 to 2004 and then 2006 to 2008 Sens-Oliver had a seat in the Victorian women's senior eight contesting the Queen's Cup at the Interstate Regatta. She stroked the 2003 crew to a 2nd-place finish but then enjoyed three consecutive Victorian victories from 2006 to 2008 when she rowed either at bow or in the seven seat. In 2004 she doubled-up when she again raced for the Nell Slatter Trophy as the Vic women's single sculler.

== Coaching career ==
From 2009 to 2020 Sens-Oliver was a senior coach progressing to Head Coach at the Mainze Rowing Club in the Rhineland in Germany. During that time sixteen Mainze rowers were selected to German national representative crews.

== International rowing palmares ==
- 2000: Silver medal World Rowing U23 Championships – W4X
- 2002: Gold medal World Rowing U23 Championships – W2-
- 2002: Bronze medal World Rowing Cup III Munich – W2-
- 2003: 6th place World Rowing Championships – W2X
- 2004: 6th place 2004 Athens Olympics - W8+
- 2006: Silver medal World Rowing Championships – W4X
- 2007: 7th place World Rowing Championships – W4X
- 2008: 9th place 2004 Athens Olympics - W2X
