= Donna Martin (rower) =

Australian rower

Personal information
- Nationality: Australian
- Born: 11 January 1980 (age 45); Melbourne, Australia

Sport
- Sport: Rowing

Donna Martin (born 11 January 1980) is an Australian rower. She competed in the women's double sculls event at the 2004 Summer Olympics.
