= Johann Karl Eduard Buschmann =

German philologist (1805–1880)

Johann Karl Eduard Buschmann (14 February 1805 in Magdeburg – 21 April 1880 in Berlin) was a German philologist. His research in comparative philology was directed chiefly toward the dialects of Malaysia and Polynesia and those of Central and Northwestern America. He worked closely with Wilhelm and Alexander von Humboldt.

== Biography ==
His early schooling was at the school of the Jacobi-Kirche (1811-1814), and then at the Domschule in Magdeburg (1814-1823). He then studied (1823-1827) at the University of Berlin under Böckh, Wolf, and Hegel, and at the University of Göttingen under Bopp. Then he was a tutor in Mexico, where he gave much attention to the Aztec and other languages. He returned to Germany via the United States, France and the Netherlands.

In Germany, he settled in Berlin where he was introduced by Bopp to Wilhelm von Humboldt, whom he assisted from 1829 to 1835 in the preparation of his work on the Kavi language in Java. Humboldt also recommended Buschmann to the royal library in Berlin, where he became an assistant in 1832. After Humboldt's death in 1835, Buschmann was the sole author of the third volume, which contained a comparative grammar of the South Sea and Malay languages. The Berlin Academy put him in charge of editing the whole work (3 vols., Berlin, 1836-1840). Buschmann also published Humboldt's vocabulary of the Tahitian language in his Aperçu de la langue des îles Marquises et la langue taïtienne (1843).

Alexander von Humboldt employed him to prepare the original manuscript of his Kosmos (1845-1859), of which the last MS. volume, corrected by Humboldt, was in 1866 presented by Buschmann to the emperor Napoleon, who gave it to the imperial library in Paris. Buschmann was made professor at the University of Berlin in 1840, and director of the royal library in 1853. In 1851, he became a member of the Berlin Academy.

== Works ==
In addition to Aperçu, he wrote:

- Die Conjugation des französischen Verbums (The conjugation of French verbs; 1831, 2nd ed. 1833)
- Über die aztekischen Ortsnamen (On Aztec place names; 1853)
- Die Spuren der aztekischen Sprache im nördlichen Mexiko und höhern amerikanischen Norden (Traces of the Aztec language in northern Mexico and upper North America; 1859)
- Das Apache und der athapaskische Sprachstamm (3 vols., 1860–63)
- Grammatik der sonorischen Sprachen (Grammar of the Sonoran dialects; 3 parts, 1864–69)
- Über den Naturlaut (1883)

He edited the writings of Moses Mendelssohn (7 vols., 1843-1845) and the Fremdwörterbuch of Christian August Heynes (Dictionary of foreign words; 9th ed. 1844).
